= KQUE =

KQUE may refer to:

- KQUE (AM), a radio station (980 AM) licensed to serve Rosenburg-Richmond, Texas, United States
- KQUE-FM, a radio station (88.1 FM) licensed to serve Bay City, Texas
- KCOH, a radio station (1230 AM) licensed to serve Houston, Texas, which held the call sign KQUE from 1997 to 2013
- KLTN, a radio station (102.9 FM) licensed to serve Houston, Texas, which held the call sign KQUE from 1960 to 1997
