= KFTG =

- Pasadena, Texas; United States
- Broadcast area: Greater Houston
- Frequency: 88.1 MHz

Programming
- Language: Spanish
- Format: Christian

Ownership
- Owner: Aleluya Christian Broadcasting, Inc.
- Sister stations: KABA-FM, KQUE-FM, KQUE, KCOH, KRCM, KMIC, KBRZ, KBRZ-FM

History
- First air date: October 27, 1982
- Former call signs: KJIC (1982–1994)

Technical information
- Licensing authority: FCC
- Facility ID: 12969
- Class: A
- ERP: 700 watts
- HAAT: 57 meters (187 ft)
- Transmitter coordinates: 29°41′18″N 95°12′7″W
- Translator: see table

Links
- Public license information: Public file; LMS
- Website: radioaleluya.org

KFTG (88.1 FM) is a radio station broadcasting a Spanish Religious format. Licensed to Pasadena, Texas, United States, it serves the Houston area. The station is currently owned by Aleluya Christian Broadcasting, Inc.

KFTG rebroadcasts its programming on co-channel 88.1 K201EU to expand coverage into Katy and west Houston, and K201DZ to expand coverage on to Galveston Island, where KFTG's main signal reception is marginal or non-existent.

Broadcast translators for KFTG
Call sign	Frequency	City of license	FID	ERP (W)	HAAT	Class	Transmitter coordinates	FCC info
K201EU	88.1 FM	Katy, Texas	88918	250	57 m (187 ft)	D	29°49′19″N 95°52′58″W	LMS
K201DZ	88.1 FM	Port Bolivar, Texas	85717	200	89 m (292 ft)	D	29°19′28″N 94°47′8″W	LMS
