= KQBU =

KQBU may refer to:

- KQBU (AM), a radio station (920 AM) licensed to El Paso, Texas, United States
- KQBU-FM, a radio station (105.1 FM) licensed to Wickenburg, Arizona, United States
- KAMV, a radio station (107.1 FM) licensed to Benbrook, Texas, United States, which held the call sign KQBU-FM from 2025 to 2026
- KESS, a radio station (93.3 FM) licensed to Port Arthur, Texas, United States, which held the call sign KQBU-FM from 2001 to 2007 and 2009 to 2025
