= KAMA-FM =

Spanish-language contemporary hit radio station in Deer Park–Houston, Texas

- Deer Park, Texas; United States
- Broadcast area: Greater Houston
- Frequency: 104.9 MHz (HD Radio)
- Branding: Latino Mix 104.9

Programming
- Language: Spanish
- Format: Contemporary hit radio
- Subchannels: HD2: TUDN Radio; HD4: Radio Visión Latina 106.1 (Christian)

Ownership
- Owner: Uforia Audio Network; (Tichenor License Corporation)
- Sister stations: Radio: KLTN, KOVE-FM, KESS; TV: KXLN-DT, KFTH-DT

History
- First air date: January 7, 1969 (as KFRD-FM Rosenberg)
- Former call signs: KFRD-FM (1969–1990); KMIA (1990–1993); KMPQ-FM (1993–1995); KLTO (1995–1998); KOVA (1998–2001); KPTY (2001–2007)
- Call sign meaning: "Amor" (previous AC branding)

Technical information
- Facility ID: 57806
- Class: C2
- ERP: 10,500 watts
- HAAT: 300 meters (980 ft)
- Transmitter coordinates: 29°45′26″N 95°20′18″W
- Translators: 106.1 K291CE (Houston, relays HD4)

Links
- Webcast: Listen live; Listen live (via iHeartRadio)
- Website: 104.9 Latino Mix

KAMA-FM (104.9 MHz, "104.9 Latino Mix") is a commercial radio station licensed to Deer Park, Texas, and serving the Greater Houston radio market. It is owned by the Uforia Audio Network, a subsidiary of Univision, and it airs a Spanish-language CHR/Top 40 format.

KAMA-FM has an effective radiated power (ERP) of 10,500 watts and is a Class C2 FM station (equivalent to 50,000 watts at 500 feet). The transmitter is located on the historic 1948 KNUZ tower, along with sister station 102.9 KLTN, at 315 N. Ennis Street in the East End. The studios and offices are located in the Univision building in Uptown Houston, on the Southwest Freeway (U.S. Highway 59).

== History ==
=== KFRD-FM and KPTY ===
Originally, the station was licensed to Rosenberg, Texas. It signed on the air on January 7, 1969, as KFRD-FM, the sister station to AM 980 KFRD. KFRD-AM-FM simulcast a country music format.

Since being owned by Univision, and its predecessor Tichenor Broadcasting, 104.9 has switched formats many times. It was once in simulcast with 93.3 KQBU-FM Port Arthur as both Spanish Adult Contemporary "K-Love" and Regional Mexican "Estereo Latino". After it broke off the simulcast with 93.3, 104.9 became an English language station once again, as "The House Party, 104.9" featuring a Rhythmic Contemporary format targeting second and third generation Hispanics. Once the 104.9 facility was moved from Missouri City, Texas, to Deer Park, it simply rebranded as "Party 104.9".""The House Party" relaunches as "Party 104.9"".

The 104.9 facility has moved its city of license (COL) on two separate occasions. Having originated in Rosenberg, it then was moved to the Wells Fargo Bank Building in downtown Houston, and relicensed to Missouri City. After a few years, Univision moved 104.9 once again, as well as increased power of the station to 10,500 watts. This time, 104.9 relocated its transmitter to the historic East End of downtown Houston's Ennis Street tower, which has historically housed both now-Univision co-owned 102.9 KLTN, as well as the original sister to 102.9, 1230 KNUZ (now KCOH). With the change to physical location at the Ennis tower, KAMA also changed COL again to its current Deer Park license. 104.9 also gained a simulcast partner as 105.3, licensed to Crystal Beach, Texas, became Party as well. Univision applied for and was granted a similar call sign to 104.9's KPTY, with 105.3 becoming KPTI during the simulcast and remaining with those call letters until it took over KPTY after the end of the Party format on 93.3."KPTY-FM Missouri City - Houston".

=== "Amor" and "Tu Musica" ===
On December 4, 2007, the station dropped the Rhythmic Contemporary "Party" format and became "Amor", a Latin pop format aimed at adults. The rhythmic "Party" format and the KPTY call sign were moved to 93.3 FM in Port Arthur, Texas, replacing Regional Mexican KQBU-FM. 104.9 remained in simulcast with 105.3 KPTI Winnie (now KLTW) until 105.3 was sold to Excel Media. “Amor” competed with 101.1 KLOL and 107.9 KQQK in the Latin pop format.

In January 2008, Univision rebranded KAMA-FM from "Amor 104.9" to "104.9 Tu Musica".

=== "Latino Mix" ===
On September 28, 2014, KAMA rebranded as "104.9 Latino Mix". The new branding focuses more on Spanish rhythmic music, such as Reggaeton, as well as Bachata.

On December 1, 2017, sister station 93.3 KQBU-FM left its Regional Mexican format to simulcast with KAMA-FM. This gives KAMA-FM a strong signal to the Houston market, as well as serving the Golden Triangle, including Beaumont, Port Arthur, and Orange. The simulcast would last until September 27, 2021, when 93.3 began airing programming from TUDN Radio, simulcasting co-owned KLAT.
