= KBRZ =

KBRZ may refer to:

- KBRZ (AM), a radio station (1460 AM) licensed to serve Missouri City, Texas, United States
- KBRZ-FM, a radio station (89.7 FM) licensed to serve Victoria, Texas
