= KUZN =

- Centerville, Texas; United States
- Broadcast area: Lufkin-Nacogdoches
- Frequency: 105.9 MHz
- Branding: Radio Aleluya

Programming
- Format: Spanish Religious

Ownership
- Owner: Aleluya Christian Broadcasting
- Sister stations: KTYR, KRCM, KCOH, KFTG, KMIC

History
- First air date: October 28, 1994 (facility established); June 1, 1999 (on air, as KAJG)
- Former call signs: KAJG (1994–2000); KTCJ (2001–2005)

Technical information
- Licensing authority: FCC
- Facility ID: 9087
- Class: C3
- ERP: 25,000 watts
- HAAT: 100.0 meters (328.1 ft)
- Transmitter coordinates: 31°16′56.00″N 95°53′42.00″W
- Repeater: 103.5 K278AU College Station, Texas

Links
- Public license information: Public file; LMS
- Website: http://radioaleluya.org/

KUZN (105.9 FM, Radio Aleluya) is a radio station broadcasting a Spanish Religious music format. Licensed to Centerville, Texas, United States, the station serves the Lufkin-Nacogdoches area. The station is currently owned by Aleluya Christian Broadcasting.

== History ==
The facility in Centerville, Leon County, was established by a construction permit granted by the Federal Communications Commission on September 14, 1994 to Caroline K. Powley. KAJG officially signed on the air June 1, 1999.

On January 14, 2000, KAJG was sold to KVCT TV, Inc., then transferred to parent Witko Broadcasting. The sale would result in a change of direction from the country music it was established with just two years earlier to Gospel music. A call set change to KTCJ would occur on July 27, 2001.

On August 29, 2001 Witko Broadcasting sold the facility to KTCJ, Inc. On February 14, 2003, KTCJ was sold again to KUZN (FM), Inc.; however the calls would not change to KUZN on 105.9 until March 31, 2005, as the facility was off the air incrementally during the two years following the sale from KUZN (FM) to Good Samaritan Communications of Pioche, Inc.

This sale was never consummated, resulting in the station ending up in receivership by April 2005. By October, KUZN had been reclaimed by KUZN (FM), Inc., however remained off the air for long periods of time, including nearly a two-year stint on the air with no audio being fed to the 25 kilowatt signal, resulting in a constant dead carrier.

Aleluya Broadcasting Network, owned by brothers Ruben & Roberto Villarreal of Pasadena, Texas added KUZN to their cluster of radio stations on February 27, 2008. KUZN returned to the air in October, with Special Temporary Authority, launching Spanish Christian "Radio Aleluya" and since utilizing KUZN's Class C3 signal to feed translators in College Station, Texas and Livingston, Texas.
