= KPTY =

KPTY may refer to:

- KPTY (AM), a radio station (1330 AM) licensed to serve Waterloo, Iowa, United States
- KLTW (FM), a radio station (105.3 FM) licensed to serve Winnie, Texas, United States, which held the call sign KPTY from 2009 to 2014
- KAMV, a radio station (93.3 FM) licensed to serve Port Arthur, Texas, which held the call sign KPTY from 2007 to 2009
- KAMA-FM, a radio station (104.9 FM) licensed to serve Deer Park, Texas, which held the call sign KPTY from 2001 to 2007
- KOMR, a radio station (106.3 FM) licensed to serve Sun City, Arizona, United States, which held the call sign KPTY in 2001
- KMVA, a radio station (103.9 FM) licensed to serve Gilbert, Arizona, which held the call sign KPTY from 1997 to 2001
- KAMX, a radio station (94.7 FM) licensed to serve Luling, Texas, which held the call sign KPTY from 1994 to 1995
