= KJOJ =

KJOJ may refer to:

- KJOJ-FM, a defunct radio station (103.3 FM) formerly licensed to serve Freeport, Texas, United States
- KJOZ, a radio station (880 AM) licensed to serve Conroe, Texas, which held the call sign KJOJ from 1991 to 2012
