= KOVE-FM =

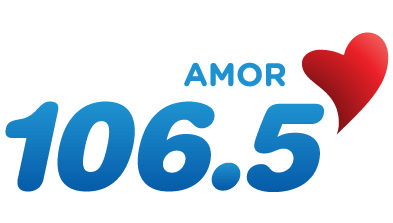
- Galveston, Texas; United States
- Broadcast area: Greater Houston
- Frequency: 106.5 MHz (HD Radio)
- Branding: Amor 106.5

Programming
- Language: Spanish
- Format: Adult contemporary
- Subchannels: HD2: Tejano Music; HD3: Norteño (KESS)
- Affiliations: Univision

Ownership
- Owner: Uforia Audio Network; (Univision Radio Illinois, Inc.)
- Sister stations: KAMA-FM, KLTN, KESS, KFTH-DT, KXLN-DT

History
- First air date: January 8, 1990
- Former call signs: KQQK (1990–2001); KQBU-FM (2001)
- Call sign meaning: "K Love" (former branding)

Technical information
- Licensing authority: FCC
- Facility ID: 19091
- Class: C
- ERP: 100,000 watts
- HAAT: 598 meters (1,962 ft)
- Transmitter coordinates: 29°18′0″N 95°6′40″W

Links
- Public license information: Public file; LMS
- Webcast: Listen live
- Website: univision.com/houston/kove

KOVE-FM (106.5 FM) is a Spanish-language radio station licensed to Galveston, Texas, United States, and serving much of Greater Houston. KOVE-FM is owned by Uforia Audio Network, a division of TelevisaUnivision. The studios are in Uptown Houston and the transmitter is in Santa Fe, Texas.

== History ==
This specific facility, licensed to Galveston in 1990, is in no way related to the previous Galveston station launched in 1968, as KGBC-FM (106.1 FM), then sold and moved to 106.5 FM, and re-licensed as KUFO in 1974. That facility, with shifting ownership and declining fortunes, became KXKX in 1979 and KQQK in 1986. The original 106.5 signed off forever in 1989, ultimately having its license cancelled by the FCC in March 1989.

=== KQQK ===
This incarnation of 106.5 was licensed and signed on January 8, 1990, retaining the KQQK calls used by the former KUFO facility before its license was surrendered nearly a year earlier. The new KQQK became a successful Tejano format, utilizing a bilingual approach in both music and presentation. Its branding was simply its dial position and calls, spoken as "1-oh-6 point 5, Kah-Koo-Koo-Kah". Air staff from the previous incarnation of KQQK returned with the new KQQK.

The popular Tejano format proved to be a hit with 2nd and 3rd generation Mexican Americans living within the coverage area, and remained well rated throughout the 1990s, and a vital partner and asset to the Mexican-American community for over a decade.

In July 2001, this facility was sold to Univision predecessor Hispanic Broadcasting Corporation, forcing KQQK, Inc. (Predecessor to El Dorado Communications) to move the already waning Tejano format to the then sister Beaumont facility KXTJ, another rimshot signal to Houston, but with less penetration into Houston proper, where the Tejano format eventually collapsed and was replaced by a Spanish Dance format, leaving AM 980 KRTX as Houston's sole broadcast home for "Puro Tejano" music. KRTX has since been sold and became a Spanish Christian formatted station itself.

=== K-Love ===
With the format and calls of KQQK now officially moved to 107.9 in Beaumont, 106.5 temporarily assumed the KQBU callset and continued simulcasting KQQK for a brief period. Towards the end of July 2001, Spanish language romantic adult contemporary "K-Love" debuted on KQBU, which coincided with the second call change inside a month to the current KOVE. K-Love would continue, with positive, sustainable ratings and cume, for the next decade. During this period, KOVE upgraded to the current Class C, 98 kilowatt, 598 meter HAAT operations.

=== Recuerdo, Más Variedad, and Amor ===
First given the name "Recuerdo", then adjusting to "Más Variedad", 106.5 has become a Spanish adult hits format that blends the larger hits of the grupera, regional Mexican and contemporary ballad music styles of Northern Mexico. Most of Más Variedad's music focuses on hits from the 1980s and 1990s; however, a small percentage of KOVE's playlist expands into more recent music offerings from the 21st Century. The station's slogan is "Más musica y Variedad", translated to English as "More Music and Variety".

On February 7, 2018, Univision dropped the "Más Variedad" Spanish adult hits format and switched it to Spanish AC as Amor 106.5. The brand returns to Houston a decade later when its sister KAMA-FM used the name from 2007 to 2008.
