= KNTE =

KNTE may refer to:

- KNTE (FM), a radio station (101.7 FM) licensed to serve Bay City, Texas, United States
- KXBJ, a radio station (96.9 FM) licensed to serve El Campo, Texas, which held the call sign KNTE-FM from 2007 to 2012
- KBRD, a radio station (680 AM) licensed to serve Lacey, Washington, which held the call sign KNTE from March 1994 to October 1994
