= KMIC =

Houston, Texas; United States
- Broadcast area: Greater Houston
- Frequency: 1590 kHz
- Branding: Radio Dabang

Programming
- Language: English
- Format: South Asian; Bollywood
- Affiliations: Radio Dabang

Ownership
- Owner: Roberto and Ruben Villarreal; (DAIJ Media, LLC)
- Sister stations: KCOH; KRCM; KBRZ; KQUE; KQUE-FM; KCVH-LD

History
- First air date: May 12, 1947; 78 years ago
- Former call signs: KATL (1947–1954); KYOK (1954–1999)
- Call sign meaning: Mickey Mouse (official mascot of The Walt Disney Company, former owner)

Technical information
- Licensing authority: FCC
- Facility ID: 20491
- Class: B
- Power: 5,000 watts
- Transmitter coordinates: 29°50′38″N 95°26′51″W
- Translator: See § Translator

Links
- Public license information: Public file; LMS
- Website: radiodabang.com

KMIC (1590 AM) is an English language South Asian music and spoken word formatted broadcast radio station licensed to Houston, Texas, serving the Greater Houston area. The station, which began broadcasting in 1947, is owned and operated by DAIJ Media.

KMIC is also licensed by the U.S. Federal Communications Commission (FCC) to broadcast in the HD (hybrid) format; however, was turned off in 2012.

== Translators ==
Broadcast translators for KMIC
Call sign	Frequency	City of license	FID	ERP (W)	HAAT	Class	FCC info	Notes
K252FR	98.3 FM	Houston, Texas	144030	30	150 m (492 ft)	D	LMS	First air date: February 16, 2018
K258BZ	99.5 FM	Sugar Land, Texas	65769	99	143 m (469 ft)	D	LMS	

== History ==
=== Beginnings as KATL ===
This station began as KATL on 1590 kHz in 1947 and is the sixth-oldest surviving station licensed in the Houston area. The station launch was postponed by engineering problems. KATL went on the air at 6 p.m. on May 12, under special authority since it hadn't received its official license. KATL became an affiliate of Gordon McLendon's Liberty Broadcasting System.

=== KYOK ===
KATL was sold in 1954 to two Louisiana businessmen, Jules Paglin and Stanley Ray, for their "OK" group of stations targeted at African American listeners. The call sign were then changed to KYOK. Its Urban contemporary gospel format lasted on and off for over four decades, and also aired an Urban Contemporary (or Soul music) format within that time frame.

From 1988 to 1992, KYOK was known as "The New YO! 1590 Raps", and aired a hip hop-heavy mainstream urban format.

From the Fall of 1992 to the Fall of 1994, it aired an Urban adult contemporary format as "AM 1590 The New KHYS, playing the Hits & Dusties", and simulcasted along with Houston rimshots KJOJ-FM and KHYS.

From Fall of 1994 to 1996, the station played Soul Oldies as "AM 1590 Solid Gold Soul". In late 1996, the station switched back to Gospel as "Gospel 1590 AM".

=== Radio Disney ===
The return to Gospel lasted until 1999, when the owners sold the station to The Walt Disney Company/ABC Radio and switched it to an affiliate of Radio Disney on February 8, 1999. The station's callsign was changed to KMIC on July 9, 1999. KYOK, and its Gospel format, was moved to daytimer 1140 kHz, licensed to Conroe, north of Houston.

On August 13, 2014, Disney put KMIC and 22 other Radio Disney stations up for sale, to focus on digital distribution of the Radio Disney network.

=== Radio Aleluya ===
In November, Radio Disney Group filed to sell KMIC to Ethnic and Religious broadcaster DAIJ Media. DAIJ Media is also owner of KRCM, KBRZ, KQUE, KCVH-LD, KTBU and K29OH-D.

On January 8, 2015, the FCC approved the sale of KMIC from Radio Disney Group to Daij Media, at a purchase price of $3.2 million. As a result, the station went dark the following day. The station resumed operations on January 23, 2015, with a Spanish Religious format as a result of the consummation of the sale.

=== Radio Dabang ===
In mid-October 2016, Radio Aleluya programming was replaced with brokered South Asian programming "Radio Dabang" which had aired on Siga Broadcasting station KLVL in Pasadena. This was done in an effort to provide better nighttime service to the southwest areas of Houston that KLVL was unable to cover after sunset.

=== Return to "Aleluya" ===
By February 13, 2017, Radio Dabang had been replaced by Daij Media's main Spanish language Christian teaching and music format, simulcasting sister station KJOZ in Conroe. Radio Dabang, meanwhile, has returned to KLVL and added an FM translator at 95.3 FM.
