= KEDR =

KEDR may refer to:

- KEDR (FM), a radio station (91.1 FM) licensed to serve Glenhaven, California, United States; see List of radio stations in California
- KQUE-FM, a radio station (88.1 FM) licensed to serve Bay City, Texas, United States, which held the call sign KEDR from 2005 to 2015
