= KCOH =

Radio station in Houston, Texas

- Houston, Texas; United States
- Broadcast area: Greater Houston
- Frequency: 1230 kHz
- Branding: 1230 The Source

Programming
- Language: English
- Format: Urban talk; urban contemporary

Ownership
- Owner: Roberta Rose Ramirez; (Pueblo de Galilea, LLC)
- Sister stations: KMIC; KRCM; KBRZ-FM; KQUE; KQUE-FM; KFTG; KUZN; KTYR

History
- First air date: February 18, 1948
- Former call signs: KNUZ (1948–1997); KQUE (1997–2013)
- Call sign meaning: "Call of Houston" or "Kilocycles Over Houston"

Technical information
- Licensing authority: FCC
- Facility ID: 65309
- Class: C
- Power: 1,000 watts (unlimited); 410 watt (experimental synchronous operation)
- Transmitter coordinates: 29°45′26.8″N 95°20′18.8″W; 29°51′34.8″N 95°33′32.8″W (experimental synchronous operation)

Links
- Public license information: Public file; LMS
- Webcast: Listen live
- Website: 1230kcoh.com

KCOH (1230 AM) is a commercial radio station licensed to Houston, Texas, United States, that airs an urban talk and urban contemporary format. It is a return to the heritage format that aired in Houston from 1953 to 2013 on KCOH (1430 AM), moving to this facility after 1430 was sold. KCOH returned to the legendary music format on March 14, 2019, while KCOH officially relaunched on Monday April 15, 2019 as "1230 KCOH, The Source", featuring many of the long-time KCOH shows from the original station, and the return of such legendary KCOH personalities as Don Sam and Ralph Cooper.

== History ==
=== K-NUZ "Dial It Up" 1-2-3 ===
The radio station began in 1948 when KTHT (now KBME) vacated this frequency for a stronger signal on 790 kHz. Under the KNUZ call sign, it was a Top 40 formatted station through the 1960s, competing with KILT (AM) but eventually Houston outgrew 1230's signal coverage and KILT won the battle in the early 70s. The radio station switched to a all-sports format and became an affiliate of the Enterprise Radio Network, on March 2, 1981. When Enterprise ceased operations in September 24 of the same year, KNUZ was left with 54 hours of programming from the network. KNUZ then switched to a country format until the late 1980s, becoming a News/Opinion format until owner Dave Morris sold the station along with its sister FM, KQUE on 102.9, to Clear Channel in 1997.

=== K-NUZ Becomes "KQ 1230" ===
During a period after the AM/FM pair was sold, 1230 (now KQUE) was used to continue the MOR standards format previously on their 102.9 counterpart during the ownership days of SFX Broadcasting Corporation which took over ABC Radio affiliate KNUZ "K-News" News/Opinion. This resulted in 1230 abandoning the KNUZ calls it had used since its inception, and took the calls out of the city that had long been associated with them. The KNUZ callsign had also been used on Channel 39 (Channel 39 frequency now occupied by KIAH).

The KNUZ callsign was quickly requested and assigned to AM 1090 in Bellville, Texas.

=== After 41 Years, "KQ" Goes Dark ===
After the longtime Standards and Big Band format was folded in May 2001, KQUE became part of a quadcast with Rhythmic oldies-formatted KTJM until July 2001, along with 880 AM, and 103.3 FM. KQUE then dropped the quadcast and began a simulcast of classic rock-formatted KKRW (now KQBT).

=== Liberman Purchases KQUE; KCOH Moves to 1230 ===
LBI acquired KQUE in June 2002. Under Liberman's control, the station began as a simulcast partner of KTJM, as "La Raza", with a Regional Mexican format.

It then continued as a Regional Mexican station under its own identity, and simulcast with 880 KJOJ, as "Radio Ranchito". It has also been the home of brokered programming, while owned by Liberman, as it was the home of Desi language "Hum Tum Radio" for a short period.

On March 1, 2013, KQUE would return to English-language broadcasting as it became the new home for the Urban Oldies format, continued from its long history at 1430 kHz under a LMA from Liberman Broadcasting to the Jesse Dunn organization, which provided the programming for 1230's entire broadcast day.

As a part of the lease agreement between Liberman and the Dunn organization, the KQUE call would be retired, as the legendary KCOH calls were moved in tandem with the format from 1430 AM to this facility. KQUE's call set has since reappeared on the dial in the Houston area, where it is now located at 980 AM in Rosenberg, a sister station to 1230.

The station simulcasted the Regional Mexican format of then sister station 850 KEYH as "La Ranchera" prior to the sale of the facility to Pueblo de Galilea, LLC.

=== Sale to Pueblo de Galilea, LLC ===
Liberman Broadcasting filed an application to sell KCOH to Pueblo de Galilea, LLC in April 2016. It was granted by the Federal Communications Commission and consummated on May 2, 2016, resulting in KCOH becoming a member of Radio Aleluya, a local Spanish-language Christian radio network owned by Pueblo de Galilea.

On Friday October 15, 2016 Pueblo de Galilea completed the move of translator K223CW from George West, Texas to a tower located in north Houston. KCOH immediately dropped the simulcast with sister station 1590 KMIC Houston, and launched a new Tropical format on KCOH and the new translator named "La Calle 92.5".

=== ESPN Deportes Radio Moves to KCOH ===
In September 2017, ESPN Deportes Radio moved from 1180 KGOL to KCOH. With the change, KCOH also lost its FM translator 92.5 K223CW, which was moved to sister Radio Aleluya facility 880 KJOZ Conroe, while the two facilities continued the Tropical "La Calle" format that KCOH had abandoned for sports programming.

=== The Return of the Legendary KCOH ===
On March 14, 2019, 1230 KCOH dropped "ESPN Deportes Radio" and returned to the heritage Urban format long associated with the KCOH call set. At the time of the reboot it was running with no commercial interruptions.

KCOH officially relaunched as "1230 The Source" on April 15, 2019, bringing back many of the familiar shows and voices from the station's illustrious past.

The station’s tower collapsed on October 20, 2024 after a helicopter crashed into it.
