= KJOJ-FM =

Radio station in Freeport, Texas

- Freeport, Texas; United States
- Broadcast area: Greater Houston
- Frequency: 103.3 MHz

Ownership
- Owner: Estrella Media; (Estrella Radio License of Houston LLC)
- Sister stations: KTJM, KQQK, KEYH, KNTE, KZJL

History
- First air date: 1987
- Last air date: December 14, 2020
- Former call signs: KGLF-FM (1985–1990); KJOJ (1990–1991)
- Call sign meaning: "Joy of Jesus", from previous Christian format

Technical information
- Facility ID: 69565
- Class: C
- ERP: 100,000 watts
- HAAT: 303 meters (994 ft)
- Transmitter coordinates: 28°48′58″N 95°36′4″W

KJOJ-FM (103.3 FM) was a radio station licensed to Freeport, Texas, United States, operating as a rimshot into the Greater Houston area. It was last owned by Estrella Media and operated in tandem with KTJM (98.5 FM) in Port Arthur, with its transmitter to the east of the Houston area. The KJOJ-FM transmitter was located off Sgt. Joe Parks Memorial Highway in Sargent, Texas; the studios were in Bay City.

The station began broadcasting in 1987. It operated for the vast majority of its history as a simulcast partner with KTJM, enabling greater coverage of the Houston area; both stations aired a Regional Mexican format for the last 19 years of KJOJ-FM's existence. It continued in this service until December 14, 2020, when a catastrophic tower failure felled its mast at Sargent. It never returned.

== History ==
The FCC granted a construction permit in 1985 for a new station in Freeport. Bayport Broadcasting, owned by Roy Henderson, acquired the permit from Freeport Broadcasting in 1987 and built it, but it was silent by 1989, when US Radio, a company owned by Ragan Henry, spent $2 million to purchase the then-KGLF-FM. KJOJ (106.9 FM) then merged with KGLF-FM, briefly simulcasting. KJOJ and its programming then moved exclusively to 103.3 at the start of 1991 as the 106.9 station became smooth jazz KJZS. That October, KJOJ became KJOJ-FM when the former KIKR (880 AM), an AM station in Conroe, began simulcasting it.

US Radio, which owned the pair until 1996, was purchased by Clear Channel Communications. In 1996, KJOJ-FM began to simulcast KHYS's smooth jazz format, dropping a Christian country music format; the two stations would be linked for the rest of KJOJ-FM's existence.

=== Kiss and The Jam ===
On February 24, 1997, after stunting with continuous play of the song Kiss by Prince, the stations' format changed to rhythmic contemporary as "Kiss 98-5, Kiss Again 103-3". The separate name came about because KJOJ-FM aired KHYS on a 10-minute delay. In June 1998, the Kiss format was made less rhythmic.

On January 1, 1999, the station jumped on the rhythmic oldies bandwagon as "98.5 The Jam". The call letters on the Port Arthur station changed to KTJM. As part of sales required in Clear Channel's merger with AMFM Inc., El Dorado Communications acquired KJOJ-FM with other stations in 2000.

=== Switch to Regional Mexican and closure ===
In July 2001, the station was bought by Liberman Broadcasting of Burbank, California. Liberman flipped both stations to Regional Mexican as La Raza, though it initially intended to split KJOJ-FM from KTJM.

In 2019, Liberman ran into financial problems and declared Chapter 11 bankruptcy. After reorganization, the corporate name changed to Estrella Media.

The station's tower failed catastrophically on December 14, 2020. Liberman took it silent, but it would not return, and KNTE (101.7 FM) replaced KJOJ-FM as a rebroadcaster of KTJM. After over 12 months of silence, the FCC cancelled the license on June 22, 2022.
