= KFTH-DT =

Television station in Alvin, Texas

- Alvin–Houston, Texas; United States
- City: Alvin, Texas
- Channels: Digital: 36 (UHF); Virtual: 67
- Branding: UniMás 67 Houston

Programming
- Affiliations: 67.1: UniMás; 67.5: Univision; for others, see § Subchannels

Ownership
- Owner: TelevisaUnivision; (UniMas Houston LLC)
- Sister stations: KXLN-DT, KAMA-FM, KLTN, KOVE-FM, KESS

History
- First air date: January 27, 1986
- Former call signs: KTHT (1986–1987); KHSH (1987–1992); KHSH-TV (1992–2002); KFTH (2002–2003); KFTH-TV (2004–2009)
- Former channel number: Analog: 67 (UHF, 1986–2009)
- Former affiliations: Independent (1986); HSN (1986–2002)
- Call sign meaning: Telefutura Houston

Technical information
- Licensing authority: FCC
- Facility ID: 60537
- ERP: 1,000 kW
- HAAT: 579 m (1,900 ft)
- Transmitter coordinates: 29°34′16″N 95°30′38″W
- Translator(s): KXLN-DT 45.2 Rosenberg

Links
- Public license information: Public file; LMS
- Website: UniMás

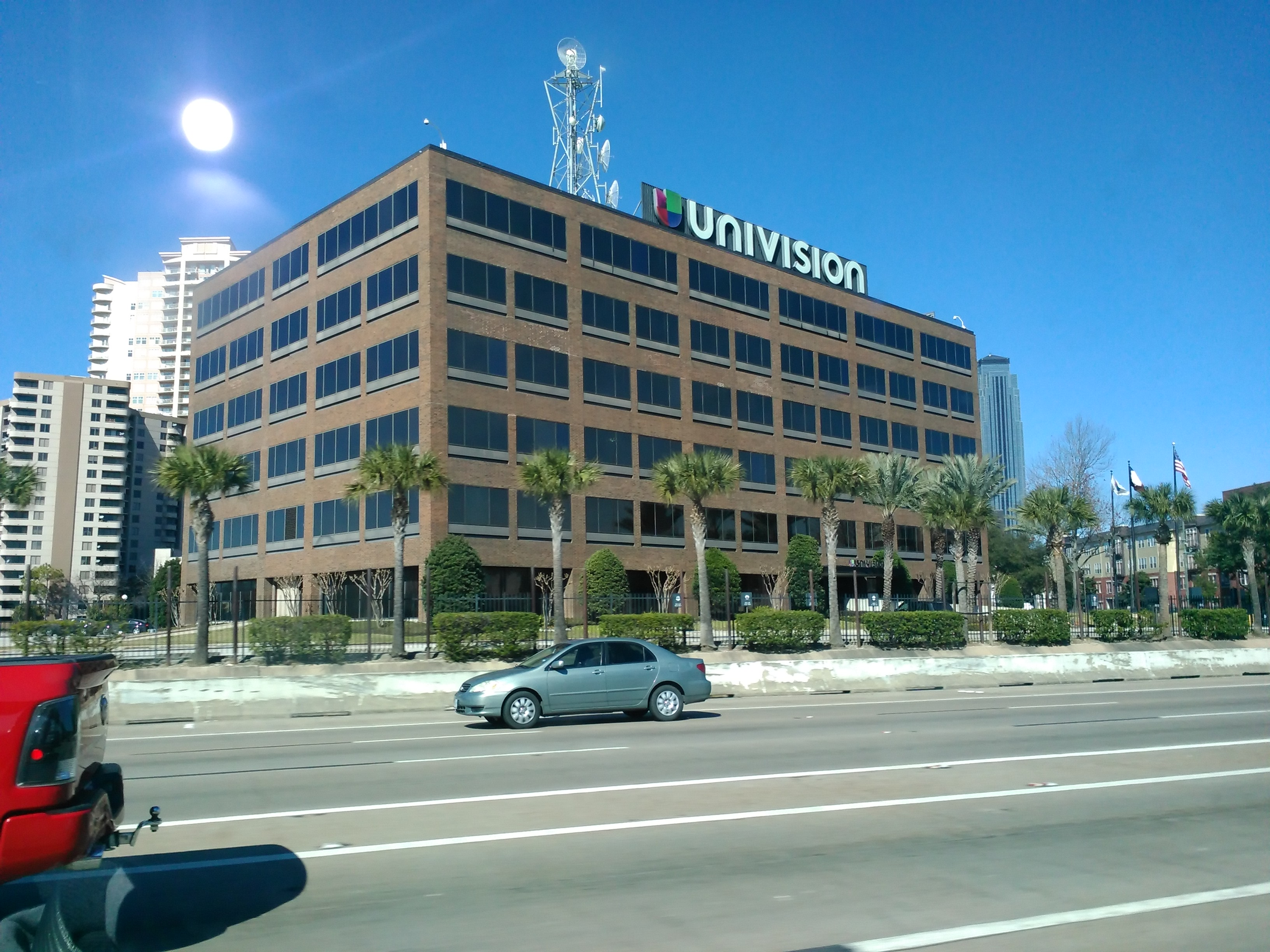
Univision building in Houston

KFTH-DT (channel 67) is a television station licensed to Alvin, Texas, United States, serving as the Houston-area outlet for the Spanish-language network UniMás. It is owned and operated by TelevisaUnivision alongside Rosenberg-licensed Univision station KXLN-DT (channel 45). The two stations share studios near the Southwest Freeway (adjacent to the I-610/I-69 interchange) on Houston's southwest side; KFTH's transmitter is located near Missouri City, in unincorporated northeastern Fort Bend County. KFTH's main subchannel is also broadcast by KXLN-DT from its transmitter.

Channel 67 was put on the air by Four Star Broadcasting as KTHT, greater Houston's fourth independent station, on January 27, 1986. Its owners sold it to the Home Shopping Network later that year, and it broadcast home shopping programming from November 1986 to January 2002 as KHSH. Univision acquired the group of former HSN-owned stations, USA Broadcasting, and used it to launch Telefutura in January 2002.

== History ==
In April 1982, the Federal Communications Commission assigned channel 67 to Alvin, Texas, at the petition of David Eugene Brown. Four groups applied for the channel, with Four Star Broadcasting winning the construction permit in a settlement approved in November 1983. The winning applicant was a consortium of state legislator Harold Dutton, Boston-based investor Don Moore, and Warburg Pincus—and managed by Jack Moffitt, who arrived in Alvin from WUAB in Cleveland.

KTHT (whose call sign had no meaning) signed on the air on January 27, 1986. Operating as the Houston market's fourth independent station, it had studios in Alvin and an advertising sales office near the Astrodome and broadcast primarily older and cheaper syndicated programs and movies. The existing three independents in Houston—KTXH, KRIV, and KHTV—had bought up enough children's programs that no such shows appeared on channel 67's lineup.

In September, less than nine months after starting up, Four Star agreed to sell KTHT to the Home Shopping Network (HSN) for $15 million as its seventh broadcast TV station. The station began airing 24-hour home shopping programming on November 13 and changed its call sign to KHSH (Home Shopping Houston) on January 23, 1987. In 1992, KHSH added the -TV suffix to its call sign.

Former logo, used from January 14, 2002, to January 7, 2013.

Barry Diller acquired Silver King Broadcasting, HSN's stations division (later renamed USA Broadcasting), in 1995 with plans to eventually roll out a new format, "CityVision", on the stations in the portfolio. However, after the format failed to take off where it was introduced and the company registered operating losses of $62 million in 2000, Diller opted to sell the stations to Univision in 2001. KHSH-TV changed its call sign to KFTH on January 14, 2002, when it became part of Univision's new secondary network, Telefutura. Telefutura rebranded as UniMás in 2013.

== Newscasts ==
On April 4, 2011, sister station KXLN debuted a weekday morning news program for KFTH, called Vive La Mañana. Like the newscasts on KXLN, it was broadcast in high definition, and was produced out of the station's current news set. Dallas–Fort Worth sister station KUVN-DT used the same brands for their newscasts that are simulcast on sister station KSTR-DT; Vive La Mañana featured a different graphics and music package that is shared by both stations. The program was canceled in March 2015.

== Technical information ==
=== Subchannels ===
The station's signal is multiplexed:

Subchannels of KFTH-DT
Subchannel	Res.	Short name	Programming
67.1	720p	KFTH-DT	UniMás
67.2	480i	GetTV	Great (4:3)
67.3	480i	GRIT	Grit
67.4	480i	HSN	HSN
67.5	720p	KXLN-HD	Univision (KXLN-DT)
67.6	480i	BT2	Infomercials
20.3	480i	QVC-2	QVC2 (KTXH)

Simulcast of subchannels of another station
Broadcast on behalf of another station
Subchannel broadcast with MPEG-4 video

=== Analog-to-digital conversion ===
KFTH-TV ended regular programming on its analog signal, over UHF channel 67, on June 12, 2009, as part of the federally mandated transition from analog to digital television. The station's digital signal remained on its pre-transition UHF channel 36, using virtual channel 67.
