= KLTN =

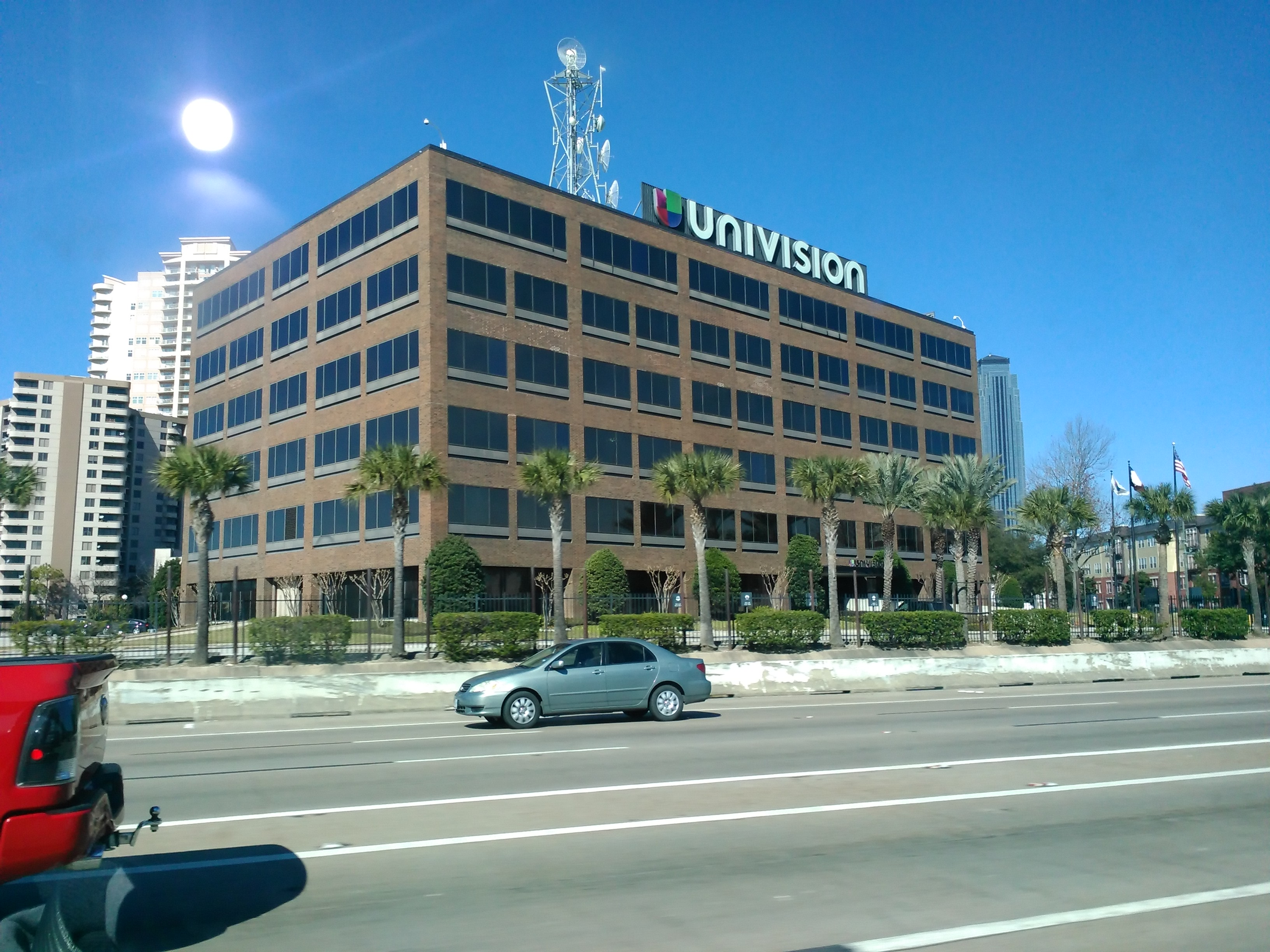
- Univision building in Houston
- Houston, Texas; United States
- Broadcast area: Greater Houston
- Frequency: 102.9 MHz (HD Radio)
- Branding: Qué Buena 102.9

Programming
- Language: Spanish
- Format: Regional Mexican
- Subchannels: HD2: TUDN Radio (KLAT); HD3: Tejano

Ownership
- Owner: Uforia Audio Network; (Univision Radio Illinois, Inc.)
- Sister stations: KAMA-FM; KOVE-FM; KESS; KXLN-DT; KFTH-DT

History
- First air date: October 4, 1960
- Former call signs: KQUE-FM (1960–1997); KKPN (1997–1998)
- Call sign meaning: Station formerly branded as Estéreo Latino

Technical information
- Licensing authority: FCC
- Facility ID: 65310
- Class: C0
- ERP: 99,500 watts
- HAAT: 300 meters (980 ft)
- Transmitter coordinates: 29°45′26.8″N 95°20′19.8″W

Links
- Public license information: Public file; LMS
- Webcast: Listen live; Listen live (via iHeartRadio)
- Website: univision.com/houston/kltn

KLTN (102.9 FM, "Que Buena 102.9") is a regional Mexican radio station licensed to Houston, Texas, United States. Owned by Univision Radio, its studios are in Uptown Houston and the transmitter is located on the historic (1948) KNUZ tower, along with sister station KAMA-FM, at 315 N. Ennis Street in the East End.

== History ==
=== Prior use of 102.9 in Houston ===
The first station to use 102.9 MHz in Houston was KPRC-FM, which moved there from 99.7 MHz at 3 pm on December 24, 1946. Calls changed to KHGM (meaning "Home of Good Music") in November 1958. By April 1959 the station had moved again, back to the middle of the FM dial at 99.1 MHz, where it is now known as KODA.

=== KQUE 103 ===
Broadcasting returned to 102.9 FM when KQUE signed on the air on October 4, 1960. It was co-owned by Dave Morris who also owned KNUZ (1230 AM).

Beginning in 1961, the station had a ERP of 280,000 watts, making KQUE a "superpower FM" (running more than the 100 kW ERP now allowed for top end FM stations) but was lowered to normal power after the tower was extended in the 1970s, was also known as "KQUE 103" until 1997, when the station was purchased from its local owner, Dave Morris, by Robert F. X. Sillerman and his company, SFX Broadcasting.

=== The Planet ===
At 4 p.m. on March 19, 1997, the KQUE callsign and standards format were moved to 1230 AM, with 102.9 then flipping to KKPN, a Modern AC format known as "The Planet", under Steve Hick's Capstar Broadcasting ownership (the first song on "The Planet" was "You Oughta Know" by Alanis Morissette). After a series of mergers, the station came under the ownership of Clear Channel Communications. Clear Channel was forced to spin off several stations in the Houston area to meet Federal Communications Commission ownership restrictions.

=== Estereo Latino ===
KKPN, at that time, had the smallest overall coverage area of all the stations in the Clear Channel cluster (due to its 1,000-foot tower location east of downtown Houston) and it could not move to the 2,000 foot Missouri City antenna farm."KKPN Houston "102.9 The Planet" becomes "Estereo Latino"".

KKPN was then sold to Heftel Communications, a company specializing in Spanish language broadcasting. Heftel changed the station to its current format, which moved from the two rimshot facilities 93.3 KLTN and 104.9 KLTO, on March 29, 1998. The station was assigned the current KLTN call letters on June 25, 1998 after being moved from 93.3. Heftel merged with Tichenor Media to create Hispanic Broadcasting, which later became Univision Radio, the station's current owner.

=== Que Buena ===
After nearly 20 years as either "Estereo Latino" or simply the dial position of "102.9", KLTN has been renamed "Que Buena 102.9" as of April 6, 2018, taking the name formerly used by its sister station KQBU-FM, which itself dropped the brand and format recently to simulcast its other sister KAMA-FM "Latino Mix 104.9".
