= KTXH =

Television station in Houston

ATSC 3.0 station

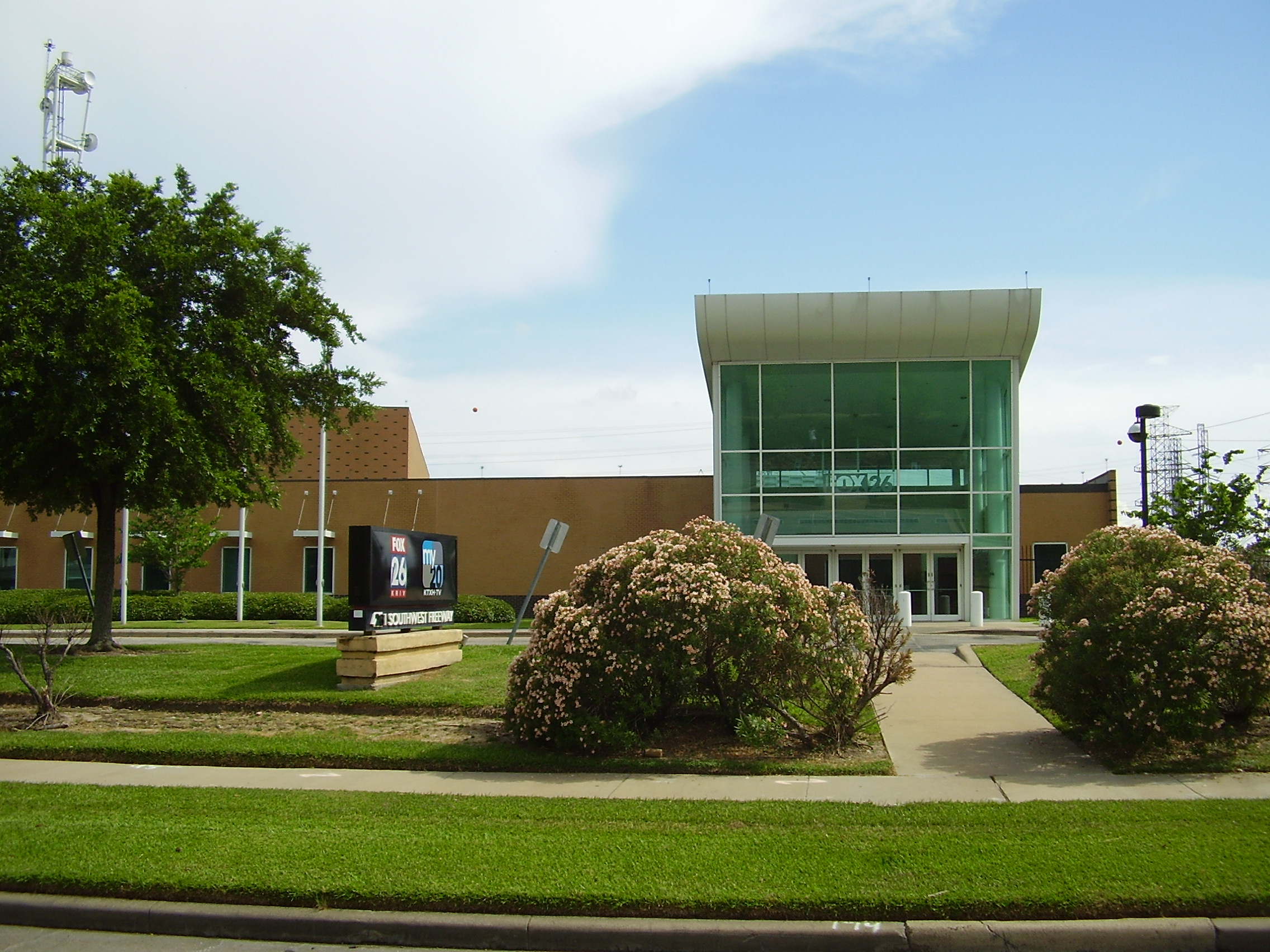
- Studios for KTXH and KRIV on Southwest Freeway in Houston
- Houston, Texas; United States
- Channels: Digital: 19 (UHF); Virtual: 20
- Branding: Fox Houston Plus

Programming
- Affiliations: 20.1: Independent with MyNetworkTV; for others, see § Subchannels

Ownership
- Owner: Fox Television Stations, LLC
- Sister stations: KRIV

History
- First air date: November 7, 1982
- Former channel numbers: Analog: 20 (UHF, 1982–2009)
- Former affiliations: Independent (1982–1995); UPN (1995–2006)
- Call sign meaning: Texas Houston

Technical information
- Licensing authority: FCC
- Facility ID: 51569
- ERP: 421 kW
- HAAT: 596 m (1,955 ft)
- Transmitter coordinates: 29°33′45.1″N 95°30′35.8″W

Links
- Public license information: Public file; LMS

KTXH (channel 20), branded as Fox Houston Plus, is a television station in Houston, Texas, United States. It is programmed primarily as an independent station, but maintains a secondary affiliation with MyNetworkTV. KTXH is owned by Fox Television Stations alongside KRIV (channel 26) and the two stations share studios on Southwest Freeway (I-69/US 59) in Houston; KTXH's transmitter is located near Missouri City, Texas.

KTXH began broadcasting in November 1982 as Houston's third independent station. A month after going on air, its broadcast tower collapsed in a construction accident that killed five people. The station recovered and emerged as Houston's sports independent, beginning long associations with the Houston Astros and Houston Rockets that continued uninterrupted through the late 1990s and sporadically until the early 2010s. Not long after starting up, KTXH was sold twice in rapid succession for large amounts. However, when the independent station trade, advertising market, and regional economy cooled, it was sold again for less than half of its previous value. The Paramount Stations Group acquired KTXH and other stations in two parts between 1989 and 1991, bringing much-needed stability.

KTXH was one of several Paramount-owned stations to be charter outlets for the United Paramount Network (UPN) in 1995; in 2001, after UPN was acquired by CBS, Fox took possession of the station in a trade and merged its operations with KRIV. When UPN merged into The CW in 2006, bypassing all of Fox's UPN and independent stations in the process, the station became part of Fox's MyNetworkTV service. In 2021, the station became one of two ATSC 3.0 (NextGen TV) transmitters for the Houston area; its subchannels are now transmitted by other local stations on its behalf.

== History ==
=== Construction, start-up, and tragedy ===
Interest in channel 20 in Houston began to emerge in 1976, as three groups filed applications for new television stations in light of the emerging technology of subscription television (STV). These were Channel 20 Houston, Inc., a group led by Robert S. Block of Milwaukee; Channel 20, Inc., headed by Sidney Shlenker; and CPI Subscription TV, subsidiary of cable television company Communications Properties, Inc. CPI withdrew, and a settlement application between the Block and Shlenker consortia—Channel 20, Inc.—was granted the construction permit by the Federal Communications Commission (FCC) on May 19, 1980. It was the second joint settlement between Block and Shlenker for a Texas station; the Shlenker consortium, with Milton Grant as head of operations, had previously received the construction permit for KTXA in Fort Worth in March. That station began broadcasting in February 1981 as a hybrid operation, with commercial programming and ON TV, the STV service owned by Oak Industries. Oak was to own a majority stake in the local ON TV operation. Channel 20's launch was delayed due to holdups in determining the local structure of the ON TV franchise and a dispute involving the mineral rights under the new Senior Road Tower, a 1,971-foot (601 m) mast in Fort Bend County that would be used to transmit KTXH and nine Houston FM radio stations.

KTXH began broadcasting on November 7, 1982, branding on-air as "20-Vision" and broadcasting from studios at 8950 Kirby Drive in Houston. By that time, though, Oak had frozen its plans into eventual cancellation, with Grant telling Ann Hodges of the Houston Chronicle that their operation had shut down completely. This was to the benefit of KTXH's ad-supported commercial offerings, giving it prime time hours to program (particularly with sports) and making reticent cable systems more willing to put the new station on their lineups. On opening night, the station showed the film The Deer Hunter, and five nights later, the station aired its first Houston Rockets basketball game; Shlenker was a 10 percent stakeholder in the NBA team. The 30 games the Rockets were slated to telecast in 1982–83 marked a record for the club. Shortly before signing on, the Houston Sports Association, owner of the Houston Astros baseball club, became a new 38 percent stockholder in KTXH, bringing with them television rights to the Astros.

In the first month on air, Houston's third independent station claimed eight percent of the viewing audience in the Houston metropolitan area, immediately moving into a tie for the lead, with its program lineup organized into thematic blocks.

KTXH was the first tenant to use the Senior Road Tower. A month later, work began to install the antenna that the FM radio stations would use on the mast. The first part was put into place on December 6. Despite winds, work proceeded the next morning, December 7. A failure in a clamping device on the hoisting mechanism caused a 75-foot (23 m) section of antenna to fall off, severing a guy wire and leading to the tower's collapse. Five people, all tower workers employed by a New Jersey company, died. KTXH suffered a $1.5 million loss in equipment, including the transmitter, on which the falling mast collapsed. A man in the transmitter building saw the tower collapse and fled.

In the wake of the tower collapse, KTXH was out of service for a total of 61 days. The station filed a $42 million lawsuit, alleging negligent construction and claiming a $7 million loss in equipment and advertising. It also immediately ordered a new transmitter as the Senior Road Tower consortium moved ahead with reconstruction of the mast, where KTXH would return upon its completion in October 1983. Even while broadcasting from a temporary facility atop the Allied Bank Plaza, KTXH continued to post competitive numbers against KRIV.

=== An ownership revolving door ===
The pairing of KTXA and KTXH had proven to be successful and highly lucrative. Grant's aggressive programming and promotions strategy, plus a favorable climate for independent stations nationally, made the two stations highly profitable and attracted major bidders. Outlet Communications, the broadcasting division of The Outlet Company of Rhode Island, was one of several parties negotiating to buy KTXA and KTXH. However, negotiations fell through, and Grant instead sold the pair to the Gulf Broadcast Group for $158 million in May 1984. The sale was held up for several months at the FCC, which conditioned the purchase on Gulf divesting FM stations in both cities. The sale price was considered unprecedented given the short period of operation of the stations.

Gulf had scarcely owned the stations when it sold its entire stations group for $755 million to Taft Broadcasting in 1985. Taft doubled the size of the KTXH facility to include a second studio and more office space. Over the course of late 1985 and late 1986, Taft was fending off overtures from activist investor Robert Bass, who was amassing shares in the company. Meanwhile, in addition to a worsening regional economy, the independent television market nationally was softening; the two Texas stations were believed to be the weakest in the Taft chain, even as KTXH boasted the highest audience share of any independent station in a top-35 market built since 1981. On Rockets telecasts during this time, a young Hannah Storm hosted pregame and postgame shows.

Taft put its broadcast group up for sale in August 1986 due to agitation by Bass. While it asked $500 million for five independent stations, the winning bidder—TVX Broadcast Group—only paid $240 million, and Taft estimated its after-tax loss for the sale at $45 to $50 million. TVX implemented budget cuts, laying off about 15 percent of the staff at the acquisitions, and renegotiated programming costs; KTXH's production unit was completely disbanded.

The Taft stations purchase left TVX highly leveraged and vulnerable. TVX's bankers, Salomon Brothers, provided the financing for the acquisition and in return held more than 60 percent of the company. The company was to pay Salomon Brothers $200 million on January 1, 1988, and missed the first payment deadline, having been unable to lure investors to its junk bonds even before Black Monday. While TVX recapitalized by the end of 1988, Salomon Brothers reached an agreement in principle in January 1989 for Paramount Pictures to acquire options to purchase the investment firm's majority stake. This deal was replaced in September with an outright purchase of 79 percent of TVX for $110 million.

=== Paramount ownership and UPN affiliation ===
In 1991, Paramount acquired the remainder of TVX. The deal gave Paramount a strategic entrance into the television stations market; three years later, Paramount merged with Viacom, and the following year, KTXH became one of the charter outlets of the United Paramount Network (UPN). In 1996, Viacom purchased a 50 percent ownership interest in UPN.

KTXH's relationship with the Rockets continued until the 1997–1998 season, when KHTV (channel 39) outbid channel 20 for the rights to the team's road games. The move was largely precipitated by what was believed to be a reluctance to commit to sports preemptions of UPN programming. KHTV, which became KHWB in 1999, cited its affiliation with The WB when it dropped the team after three years; after a disastrous start to the 2000–2001 season on new independent KTBU, plagued by low ratings and signal coverage issues in parts of the Houston metropolitan area, the Rockets moved their games back to KTXH, with some Houston Comets women's basketball telecasts appearing on the station. At the same time, the Astros—which aired 64 games in the 1997 campaign on channel 20—left for independent station KNWS-TV (channel 51), with KTXH's increasing obligations to UPN as a core factor. In both cases, ratings fell after the teams moved their games off KTXH.

=== Sale to Fox; conversion to MyNetworkTV ===
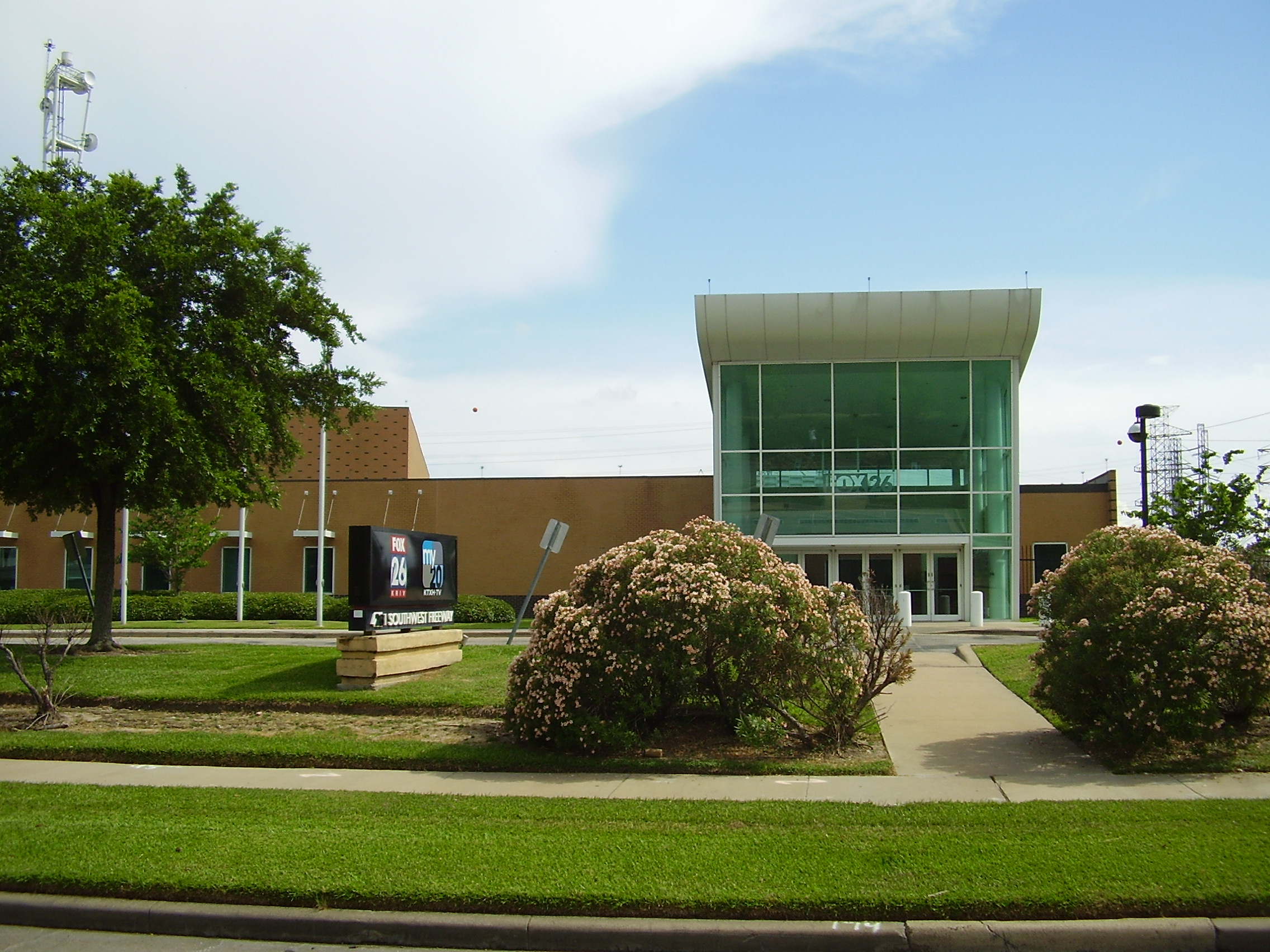
Studios for KRIV and KTXH on Southwest Freeway in Houston

KTXH former MyNetworkTV logos

KTXH's logo from June 2006 to September 24, 2018, when the station rebranded as "My20 Vision"

KTXH's "My 20 Vision" logo from September 24, 2018, to September 14, 2026, when the station was rebranded to "Fox Houston Plus"

In 2000, Viacom purchased CBS. On August 12 of that year, United Television—the United in UPN—sold its UPN stations to the Fox Television Stations subsidiary of News Corporation for $5.5 billion; the deal was finalized on July 31, 2001. As part of its acquisition of the United stations, Fox had purchased KBHK-TV in San Francisco, a city in which Fox did not own its affiliate—but there was a CBS owned-and-operated station. Similarly, Viacom now owned UPN stations in Houston (KTXH) and Washington, D.C. (WDCA), markets where it did not own the CBS affiliate but where there was a Fox owned-and-operated station. As a result, Fox traded KBHK-TV to Viacom in exchange for KTXH and WDCA, resulting in three new duopolies, including new Fox duopolies in Houston and Washington. The FCC approved the deal in August 2001 on the condition that Viacom sell one of its San Francisco radio stations. KTXH vacated the Kirby Drive facilities and consolidated with KRIV at its Southwest Freeway facility; the move led to some job losses. The Rockets departed KTXH in 2002 for a new agreement with KNWS-TV and KHWB.

On January 24, 2006, the Warner Bros. unit of Time Warner and CBS Corporation (which had been created as a result of the split of Viacom at the start of the year) announced that the two companies would shut down The WB and UPN and combine the networks' respective programming to create a new "fifth" network called The CW. In unveiling the merged network, while WB and UPN affiliates owned by WB minority stakeholder Tribune Broadcasting (including KHWB in Houston) and by CBS Television Stations were announced as charter outlets, none of the Fox-owned UPN stations—many of which were competitors to these stations—were chosen. The next month, News Corporation announced the creation of its own secondary network, MyNetworkTV, to serve its own outgoing UPN stations as well as those that had not been selected for The CW.

Even past the MyNetworkTV switch, KTXH continued its association with local sports. In late 2007 and early 2008, the Rockets and Astros returned to KTXH with a reduced schedule of games, largely in a complementary role to Fox Sports Houston, the Fox-owned regional sports network (RSN). The Astros aired all of their games on Fox Sports Houston in 2011, which was to be their last season on the RSN as the two teams prepared to launch Comcast SportsNet Houston (now Space City Home Network) in 2012.

== Technical information ==
In 1999, KTXH began broadcasting a digital signal, which was not broadcast from the Senior Road tower but from a new, purpose-built mast in the same area in Missouri City. KTXH discontinued regular programming on its analog signal, over UHF channel 20, on June 12, 2009, as part of the federally mandated transition from analog to digital television; the station's digital signal continued on UHF channel 19, using virtual channel 20.

On December 7, 2021, KTXH became one of two ATSC 3.0 (NextGen TV) transmitters for the Houston area as part of a deployment involving 10 stations in the market.

=== Subchannels ===
The station's ATSC 1.0 subchannels are carried on the multiplexed signals of other Houston TV stations:

Subchannels provided by KTXH (ATSC 1.0)
Subchannel	Res.	Short name	Programming	ATSC 1.0 host
20.1	720p	KTXH-DT	Main KTXH programming	KRIV
20.2	480i	Movies!	Movies!	KXLN-DT
20.3	480i	QVC-2	QVC2	KFTH-DT
20.4	480i	Buzzer	Buzzr	KTRK-TV

=== ATSC 3.0 lighthouse service ===
Subchannels of KTXH (ATSC 3.0)
Subchannel	Short name	Programming
13.1	KTRK	ABC (KTRK-TV)
20.1	KTXH	Main KTXH programming
26.1	KRIV	Fox (KRIV)
45.1	KXLN	Univision (KXLN-DT)
67.1	KFTH	UniMás (KFTH-DT)

Subchannel broadcast with digital rights management

== See also ==
- Fox Sports Houston
