= KGOL =

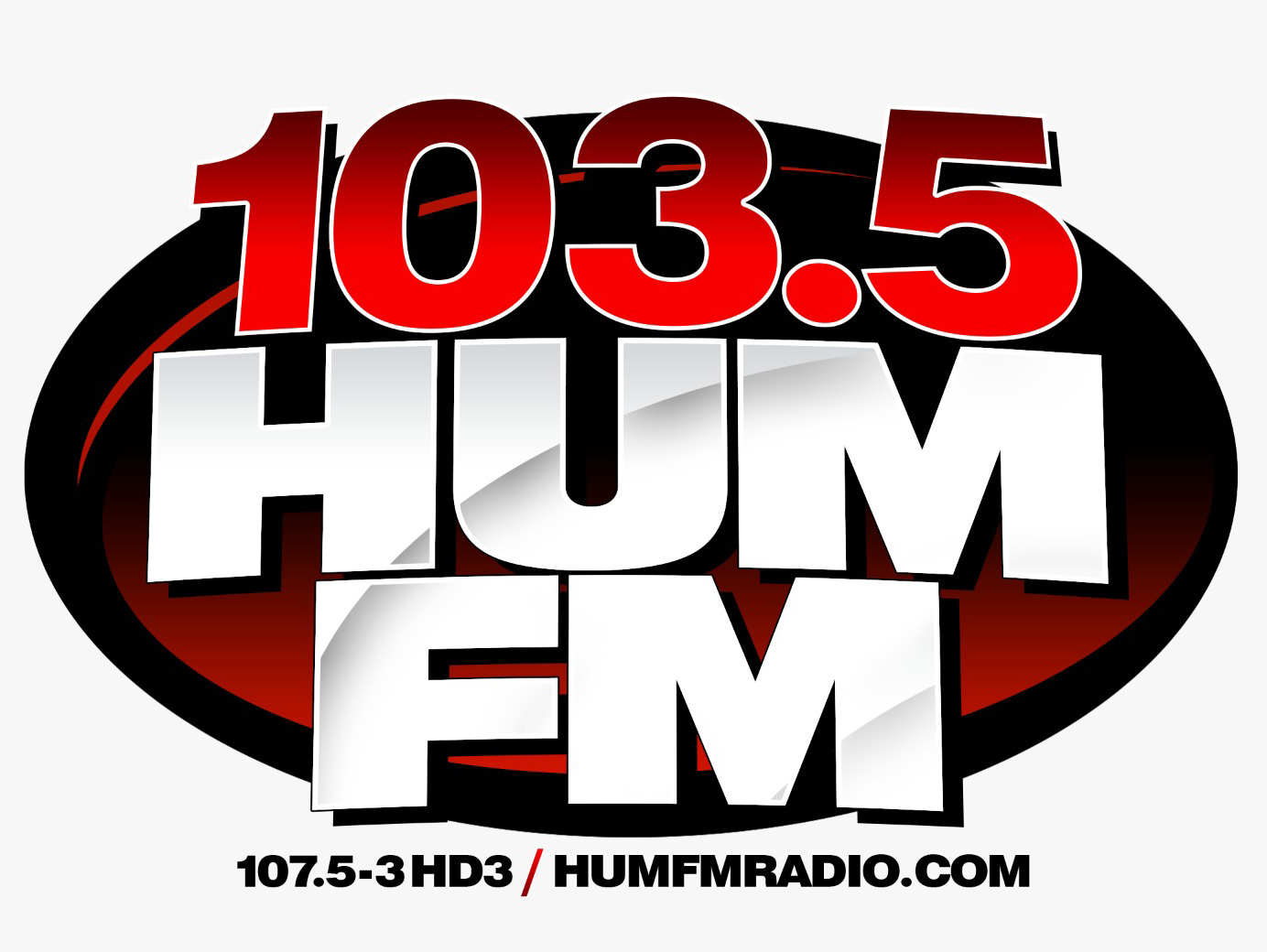
- Humble, Texas; United States
- Broadcast area: Greater Houston
- Frequency: 1180 kHz
- Branding: Hum FM

Programming
- Format: South Asian

Ownership
- Owner: Rehan Siddiqui; (FM Media Ventures LLC)

History
- First air date: September 12, 1983
- Former call signs: KTUN (1983–1986)
- Call sign meaning: God Of Love (former format)

Technical information
- Licensing authority: FCC
- Facility ID: 34473
- Class: B
- Power: 50,000 watts (day); 3,000 watts (night)
- Transmitter coordinates: 30°08′21″N 95°17′24″W
- Translators: 103.5 K278DA (Houston); 106.1 K291CE (Houston)

Links
- Public license information: Public file; LMS
- Webcast: Listen live
- Website: humfmradio.com

KGOL (1180 AM, "Hum FM") is a commercial radio station licensed to Humble, Texas, United States, and serving Greater Houston. Owned by FM Media Ventures LLC, it carries a South Asian format, with transmitter sited off of Route 1314 in Porter, Texas, near Texas State Highway 99 (Grand Parkway).

== History ==
KGOL debuted in 1983 as "1180 K-TUN", airing a middle of the road (MOR) format of popular adult music. For a time it broadcasting in Motorola C-QUAM AM stereo. While KTUN was moderately successful in the Humble/Kingwood area, the signal was poor in most parts of Greater Houston during daylight operations, and at night was only listenable in Humble itself.

In 1986, FM Christian radio station KGOL, then at 107.3 in Lake Jackson, Texas, was sold and became Classic Rock "Z-107" KZFX on 107.5 FM (now KGLK). As a result, KGOL and its Christian format was moved to AM 1180, shifting the KGOL call sign from 107.5 to 1180 in the process. KGOL's call letters stand for God Of Love.

KGOL has been a brokered facility for the majority of the last 20 years, having aired formats such as Business News "Biz Radio Network", South Asian formatted "Hum Tum City", several different variations of Spanish language talk and music, and Vietnamese programming.

In the mid-2010s, KGOL carried the ESPN Deportes Radio Network. In mid-September 2017, ESPN Deportes moved to AM 1230 KCOH, when KGOL began carrying the Entravision Regional Mexican "La Tricolor" format. But La Tricolor lasted only a few months as Entravision made sweeping changes to its stations across the U.S. KGOL then shifted to its "La Suavecita" Spanish-language AC format.

On August 30, 2021, Entravision sold the station to FM Media Ventures, LLC, a company owned by Pakistani media and entertainment businessman Rehan Siddiqui. Siddiqui, who is the producer of "Hum Tum Radio", was recently blacklisted by the Indian Ministry of Home Affairs due to "terrorism" and "producing and funding anti-Indian propaganda".

KGOL was forced to leave its transmitter site due to residential and commercial construction projects in 2025. The station opted to diplex on one of the towers of KGOW's nighttime transmitter site with a daytime power of 2,000 watts and 100 watts at night. This situation is intended to be temporary while a new site is developed.
