= KQUE (AM) =

Coordinates: 29°49′19.8″N 95°52′58.8″W

- Rosenberg-Richmond, Texas; United States
- Broadcast area: Greater Houston
- Frequency: 980 kHz
- Branding: Radio Aleluya

Programming
- Language: Spanish
- Format: Spanish Religious
- Affiliations: Aleluya Broadcasting Network

Ownership
- Owner: Aleluya Christian Broadcasting; (Daij Media, LLC)
- Sister stations: KBRZ, KBRZ-FM, KCOH, KFTG, KMIC, KQUE-FM, KRCM

History
- First air date: June 10, 1949
- Former call signs: KFRD (1949–1990); KMPQ (1990–1997); KRTX (1997–2013)

Technical information
- Licensing authority: FCC
- Class: B
- Power: 5,000 watts (day); 4,000 watts (night)
- Translator: See § Translator

Links
- Public license information: Public file; LMS
- Website: radioaleluya.org

KQUE (980 AM) is a radio station licensed to Rosenberg-Richmond, Texas, United States, and serving Greater Houston. Owned by Daij Media, LLC, it features a Spanish language Christian radio format.

== History ==
The KQUE calls have resided in the Houston area since 1960, having first occupied 102.9 FM, then 1230 AM. The calls are now shared with co-owned Aleluya sister KQUE-FM Bay City.

Prior to Daij Media's acquisition of 980, the station was owned by Univision Radio. It featured a Tejano format, using the call letters KRTX, and the name "Super Tejano 980AM KRTX". This was later shortened to "Tejano 980". Originally, this station was a country station as KFRD, from 1949 until it was sold to Roy Henderson in 1990, at which time the KMPQ calls were requested, as KFRD was moved to 1090 KACO in Bellville. Tichenor Media (predecessor to Univision) purchased the station from Henderson in 1995. 104.9 KAMA-FM Missouri City, Texas was the original counterpart to 980 as KFRD-FM, when both facilities were still owned by the original Fort Bend Broadcasting Company headed by Mart Cole, Sr. and both KFRD and KFRD-FM were still licensed to their original COL of Rosenberg.

== Translator ==
Broadcast translator for KQUE
Call sign	Frequency	City of license	FID	ERP (W)	HAAT	Class	FCC info
K264CN	100.7 FM	Richmond, Texas	147202	100	97 m (318 ft)	D	LMS
