= KXLN-DT =

Television station in Rosenberg, Texas

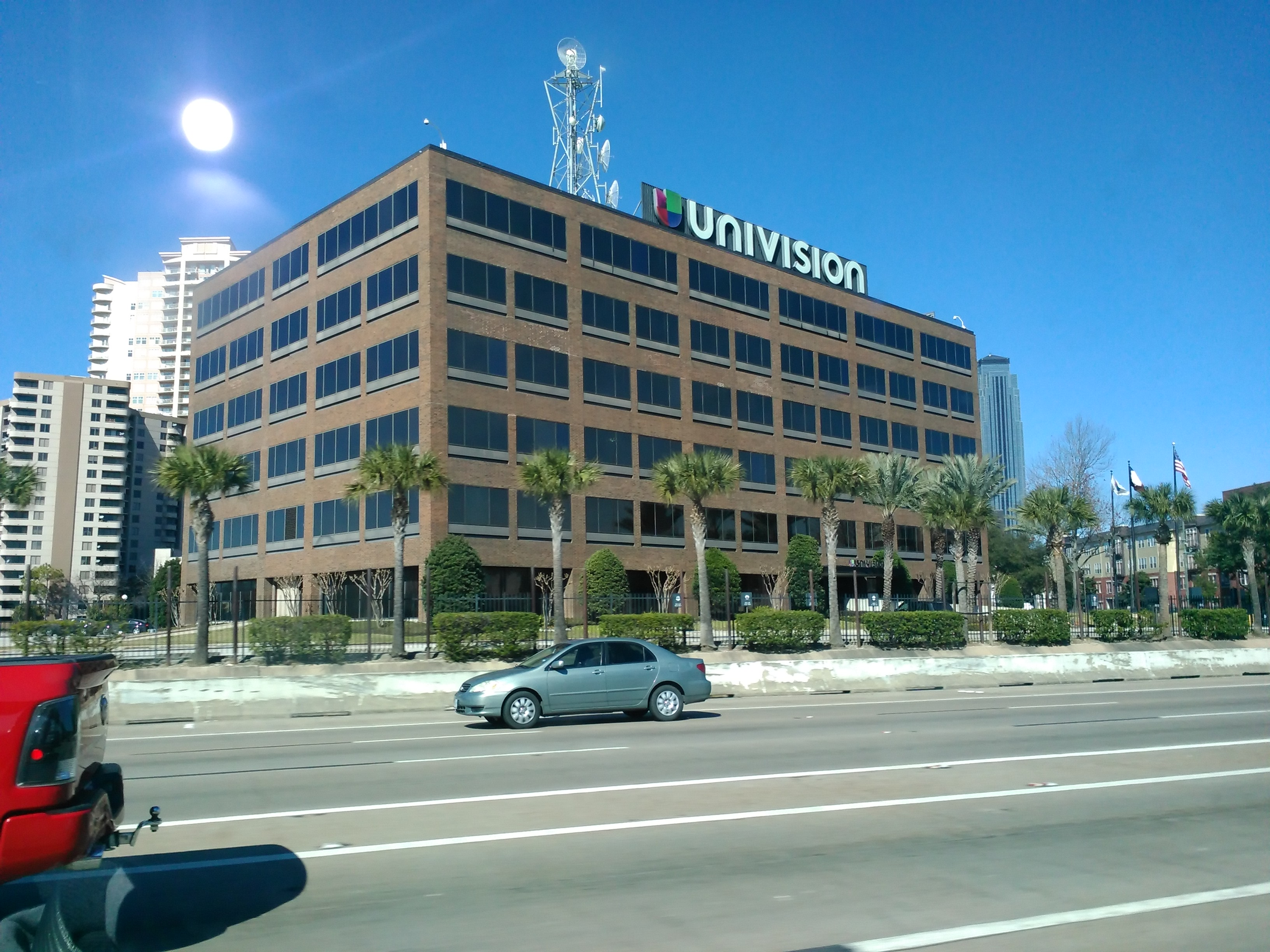
- Univision building in Houston
- Rosenberg–Houston, Texas; United States
- City: Rosenberg, Texas
- Channels: Digital: 30 (UHF); Virtual: 45
- Branding: Univision 45 Houston; Noticias N+ Univision 45 (newscasts)

Programming
- Affiliations: 45.1: Univision; 45.2: UniMas; for others, see § Subchannels

Ownership
- Owner: TelevisaUnivision; (KXLN License Partnership, L.P.)
- Sister stations: KFTH-DT, KAMA-FM, KLTN, KOVE-FM, KESS

History
- Founded: August 2, 1984
- First air date: September 16, 1987
- Former call signs: KXLN-TV (1987–2009)
- Former channel numbers: Analog: 45 (UHF, 1987–2009); Digital: 46 (UHF, until 2009), 45 (UHF, 2009–2019)

Technical information
- Licensing authority: FCC
- Facility ID: 53847
- ERP: 1,000 kW
- HAAT: 592 m (1,942 ft)
- Transmitter coordinates: 29°33′45″N 95°30′36″W
- Translator(s): KFTH-DT 67.5 Alvin

Links
- Public license information: Public file; LMS
- Website: www.univision.com/local/houston-kxln

KXLN-DT (channel 45) is a television station licensed to Rosenberg, Texas, United States, serving as the Houston-area outlet for the Spanish-language network Univision. It is owned and operated by TelevisaUnivision alongside Alvin-licensed UniMás station KFTH-DT (channel 67). The two stations share studios near the Southwest Freeway (adjacent to the I-610/I-69 interchange) on Houston's southwest side; KXLN-DT's transmitter is located near Missouri City, in unincorporated northeastern Fort Bend County.

In addition to its own digital signal, KXLN is simulcast in high definition on KFTH's fifth digital subchannel (67.5) from a separate transmitter near Missouri City.

== History ==
The earliest attempt at launching channel 45 was in 1968, when the Overmyer Network/United planned to launch the station as KJDO-TV.

In February 1980, the Federal Communications Commission (FCC) designated three applications seeking channel 45 in Rosenberg for hearing. Trinity Broadcasting of Texas dropped out in 1981, leaving two combatants for the channel. Pueblo Broadcasting, owned by businessmen A. C. Peña and J. Adán Treviño, proposed the construction of Houston's first full-time Spanish-language outlet; previously, KRIV, an English-language independent, had carried some Spanish programming from the Spanish International Network, Univision's predecessor, or adjacent to prime time. The bid had initially been prepared because SIN was interested in a station in the market and had approached local Hispanics to put together an application. The other applicant was Texas 45 Broadcasting, a subsidiary of Chicago-based Weigel Broadcasting.

The comparative hearings ended up examining Weigel's bid, more specifically issues added as to whether Weigel had misrepresented the coverage area of its only TV station, WCIU-TV, on maps it gave to prospective advertisers. In 1984, administrative law judge Edward Luton found Weigel qualified to be a licensee but also gave Pueblo the nod based on its lack of substantive broadcast interests, compared to the one station owned by Weigel, and a superior proposal for integration of management. That same year, on August 2, Pueblo signed on a translator for SIN on channel 45 (K45AK), which it had separately filed for in 1979. Plans were then made to build the full-power facility, which began broadcasting on September 16, 1987. The station originally operated from studio facilities located at 9440 Kirby Drive, near the Astrodome; it moved down the road in 1989.

KXLN was immediately profitable: by 1990, sales reached $6 million a year. It was the fastest-growing Hispanic business in the entire United States between 1984 and 1988, according to Hispanic Business magazine. Univision bought KXLN from Pueblo in 1994 for $20 million.

Univision Communications acquired channel 67, then KHSH-TV, from USA Broadcasting in 2000; that station became the Houston charter station of Univision's new secondary network, Telefutura (which was rebranded as UniMás in January 2013) when it launched in January 2002. Later that year, Univision, in a multimillion-dollar purchase, bought a six-story building in Houston's Uptown district to serve as the studio facilities for KXLN, KFTH and several Univision-owned radio stations in the Houston area. The Univision-owned local properties moved into the building in 2006.

On January 26, 2019, KXLN changed frequencies from RF channel 45 to RF channel 30 as part of the FCC's spectrum repack.

== News operation ==
In 1988, KXLN began producing news updates during Univision prime-time programming; two years later, the station began producing a 6 p.m. newscast. In 1993, KXLN debuted Houston's first Spanish-language morning news program, Houston Ahora, as well as an innovative late evening newscast called 15 Minutos. Ratings success was quick to follow; the station attracted more younger viewers than KPRC-TV by 2001.

On March 27, 2015, the station axed its morning newscast along with the local UniMás show Vive La Mañana for a regionalized morning newscast titled Noticias Texas Primera Edición that would air on Univision stations in Dallas, Houston, San Antonio, and Austin. Univision restored separate morning newscasts to the four Texas stations on March 11, 2019.

The Univision building in Houston houses a weather center, opened in 2017, that supplies the company's broadcast stations and digital platforms nationwide with weather information and forecasts.

=== Notable on-air staff ===
- Martin Berlanga – reporter
- Raul Peimbert – anchor

== Technical information ==
=== Subchannels ===
The station's signal is multiplexed:

Subchannels of KXLN-DT
Subchannel	Res.	Short name	Programming
45.1	720p	KXLN-DT	Univision
45.2	720p	Unimas	UniMás (KFTH-DT)
45.3	480i	Mystery	Ion Mystery
45.4	480i	NVSN	MovieSphere Gold
45.5	480i	Shop LC	Shop LC
20.2	480i	Movies!	Movies! (KTXH)

Simulcast of subchannels of another station
Subchannel broadcast with MPEG-4 video
Broadcast on behalf of another station

KXLN-DT transmits one of KTXH's subchannels under Houston's ATSC 3.0 (NextGen TV) deployment plan; in turn, KXLN is available in that format on the KTXH multiplex.

=== Analog-to-digital conversion ===
KXLN-DT (as KXLN-TV) ended regular programming on its analog signal, over UHF channel 45, on June 12, 2009, the official date on which full-power television stations in the United States transitioned from analog to digital broadcasts under federal mandate. The station's digital signal relocated from its pre-transition UHF channel 46 to channel 45 for post-transition operations.

Eleven days later, all Univision owned-and-operated stations, including KXLN, permanently added a "-DT" suffix to their call signs.
