= Uforia Audio Network =

Radio network in the United States

- Type: Radio network Recommender system Events planner
- Country: United States
- Headquarters: Los Angeles, California

Ownership
- Owner: TelevisaUnivision

History
- Launch date: 2003
- Former names: Hispanic Broadcasting Corporation; Univision Radio

Coverage
- Availability: Arizona, California, Florida, Illinois, New York, and Texas

Links
- Website: Uforia Website

Uforia Audio Network ( /juːˈfɔːriə/) is the radio broadcasting and music events division of TelevisaUnivision USA. Formerly known as Hispanic Broadcasting Corporation and Univision Radio, it is the eighth-largest radio broadcaster in the United States, and the largest specifically catering to Hispanic and Latino Americans. The company is headquartered in Los Angeles.

== History ==
Univision, previously known as Hispanic Broadcasting Corp. (between 2000 and September 22, 2003) and Heftel Broadcasting Corp, was the result of a February 14, 1997 merger of Tichenor Media System, Inc., a private company based in Dallas, Texas, and Heftel Broadcasting, a public company based in Las Vegas, Nevada.

Tichenor had been in broadcasting since the 1940s. McHenry Tichenor operated a station (KGBS on 1240, later KGBT on 1530) in Harlingen, Texas. In 1950, they added KUNO Corpus Christi, Texas. Later station purchases were KIFN in Phoenix, Arizona; WGMA in Hollywood, Florida; & WACO-AM-FM and TV (construction permit) in Waco, Texas. In 1975, the company (then known as Harbenito radio) added KCOR (AM) and KQXT (FM) in San Antonio.

In 1981, the grandson of the founder, McHenry T. Tichenor, Jr., was named president of the company. He began focusing on its Spanish Language stations; Waco, Hollywood, and Phoenix were sold to their local managers. In 1987 Tichenor bought WOJO, a Spanish-language FM station serving Chicago. In 1984, the company sold KQXT in San Antonio to Westinghouse's Group W Broadcasting and purchased KLAT (AM) in Houston, Texas from Marcos Rodriguez, Sr. and Marcos A. Rodriguez. The KLAT purchase gave Tichenor access to top Spanish Radio talents Chuck Brooks, Ricardo del Castillo (who later became COO, retired and has since passed) and Gary Stone (former President of Univision Radio-retired). In 1985, WIND, Chicago and KYSR AM-FM El Paso were purchased. More stations were purchased in the following years, and the home office moved from Harlingen to Dallas, Texas. Mac Tichenor, Jr.'s brother, Warren (who would later serve as U.S. Ambassador to the United Nations), became general manager of the San Antonio stations in 1991.

Univision Radio's logo used until 2013

Heftel Broadcasting was founded by Cecil Heftel, whose family and in-laws all had been in the broadcasting business. His Heftel Broadcasting in the 1950s and early 1960s was anchored by KIMN in Denver and KGMB AM and KGMB-TV in Honolulu. He added numerous large AM radio stations (KTNQ) and some promising FM stations (KLVE) before selling them in the seventies and eighties. Cecil Heftel was elected as a congressman representing Hawaii's first district in 1976; he would hold that office eleven years before resigning in 1987. During this time, his company was active, buying and selling stations in places like Indianapolis and Chicago. For about a year, Heftel and Scott Ginsburg (Statewide Communications) merged their holdings into H & G Communications.

In the early 90s, Heftel began to expand into more Spanish stations, and took steps to go public (new executive Carl Parmer). Heftel had a knack for making coalitions work, at least for a time, as in the H & G attempt. Heftel set up shop in Miami with local stations WAQI and WRTO, taking a minority interest. Heftel set up Rodriguez-Heftel Texas broadcasting along with Marcos A. Rodriguez (owner of KESS and other Dallas area stations and son of Marcos Rodriguez, Sr.). Stations were purchased outright in Los Angeles, Chicago, Las Vegas, and New York.

When HBC went public, Clear Channel Communications invested, taking in several steps up to a 20% interest. In 1996 Clear Channel tendered the shares owned by Heftel management. This got them about 62% of the company. They struck a deal to merge the new company with Tichenor Media, to be run by the Tichenor management. The deal closed in early 1997, and made for the first national Spanish Language broadcasting company.

The new company was worth $1 billion at closing and owned 38 stations. Holding were expanded for the next several years. San Francisco was added in 1996. Phoenix was added in 1999, and Fresno in 2000.

In May 2013, KAMA-FM has increased power to 10.5 kW. Other expanded and relocated stations include KFLC, KESS-FM and KDXX (FM) in the Dallas-Ft. Worth area, KBBT and KGSX in the San Antonio area, KLQV San Diego, and WADO (AM) New York. KKMR in the Phoenix, AZ area was recently granted a CP to change from class A to class C3, at a new site that will allow a 10 fold increase in its population covered. This app was started nearly a decade ago and was granted based on tweaks in the application done in 2006. Former CFO Jeff Hinson observed once that the station upgrade activity had increased the company's enterprise value by "almost $1 billion" (at a point when the company was selling to UVN for 3.5B).

In 1999, the company created a new entity, HBCI, Inc which was its interactive online presence. HBCi created a network of bilingual radio station web sites and a network of bilingual local city guide sites focused on the local Hispanic consumer in each of the markets the radio stations operated. HBCI achieved the rare milestone of reaching profitability in the dotcom industry just prior to the merger with Univision.

The company traded on the NASDAQ exchange under the symbol HBCCA. It moved to the New York Stock Exchange in May 2000. Stock traded as HSP.

In mid-2002, Univision and HBC voted to merge. The approval process was long and controversial. The deal was approved and closed on September 22, 2003.

After the merger of HBC and Univision, the division was renamed Univision Radio and Denver Colorado.

Univision Radio's logo used from 2013 until March 4, 2019

In 2013, Univision launched Uforia, a new streaming platform featuring the Univision Radio stations and other exclusive content relating to Latino music.

On March 5, 2019, Univision announced that it would re-launch the Uforia brand (with the new tagline "The Home of Latin Music"), and that the Univision Radio group had been officially renamed Uforia Audio Network. There are also plans to use the Uforia brand more extensively across platforms, including live events, as well as television programming.

Some of the syndicated shows in the Uforia Audio Network include, “El Bueno, La Mala y El Feo” (“The Good, The Bad and The Ugly”), "Buena Vibra ”, "El Free-Guey Show", "La Chula Y La Bestia' “El Hit Parade de América con Javier Romero”, "Las Repegadas De Uforia", "Todo Deportes con Broderick Zerpa", and “Intimo con Alberto Sardiñas”.

On June 3, 2022, Latino Media Network, a new media company founded by social entrepreneurs Stephanie Valencia and Jess Morales Rocketto and backed by several Latino luminaries including former Univision co-anchor Maria Elena Salinas announced it would acquire TelevisaUnivision’s radio properties in ten markets for $60 million. The purchase was consummated on December 30, 2022

On July 1, 2026, TelevisaUnivision announced that Uforia Music would be rebranded as ViX Música, consolidating a strategic evolution that strengthens the company's connection with Hispanic audiences through music, entertainment, and multiplatform content. This meant all content, initiatives, communications, and experiences previously associated with Uforia Music will begin to be progressively integrated under the new name, maintaining the commitment to offer the best of Latin music, entertainment, and Hispanic culture. Uforia will continue solely as the app's name.

== List of radio stations ==
Below is a list of radio stations that are currently owned by Univision. As of February 1, 2025, it owns 35 radio stations: 44 local stations in 14 different markets and the other 12 as national stations.

Each section is in order by call sign. BRANDS on Radio and Uforia App

Qué Buena / La Nueva: Regional Mexican (11 Stations)
Amor/K-Love: Spanish AC (10 Stations)
Latino Mix / La X: Spanish Urban / Reggaeton (8 Stations)
Mix: Spanish Tropical (1 Stations)
Estereo Latino: Norteñas, Cumbias (1 Station)
The Beat: Rhythmic CHR (1 Station)
Vibe: Rhythmic AC (1 Station)
TUDN: Spanish Sports Talk (1 Station)

=== Arizona ===
Phoenix

- KHOT-FM 105.9 FM - Regional Mexican (Qué Buena 105.9)
- KOMR 106.3 FM - Spanish AC (Amor 106.3)
- KQBU-FM 105.1 FM - Spanish Sports (TUDN Phoenix 105.1)
- KQMR 100.3 FM - Spanish Top 40 (Latino Mix 100.3)

=== California ===
Los Angeles

- KLVE 107.5 FM - Spanish AC (KLOVE 107.5)
- KLXM/KLXO 103.9 FM/98.3 FM - Spanish Top 40 (Latino Mix 103.9/98.3)
- KSCA 101.9 FM - Regional Mexican (La Nueva 101.9)

San Diego

- KLNV 106.5 FM - Regional Mexican (Qué Buena 106.5)
- KLQV 102.9 FM - Spanish AC (Amor 102.9)

San Francisco (including San Jose and Oakland)

- KBRG 100.3 FM - Spanish AC (Amor 100.3)
- KSOL/KSQL 98.9 FM/99.1 FM - Regional Mexican (Qué Buena 98.9/99.1)
- KVVF/KVVZ 105.7 FM/100.7 FM - Spanish Top 40 (Latino Mix 105.7/100.7)

=== Florida ===
Miami

- WAMR-FM 107.5 FM - Spanish AC (Amor 107.5)
- WRTO-FM 98.3 FM - Spanish Tropical (Mix 98.3)

=== Illinois ===
Chicago

- WOJO 105.1 FM - Regional Mexican (Qué Buena 105.1)
- WPPN 106.7 FM - Spanish AC (Amor 106.7)
- WVIV-FM 93.5 FM - Spanish Top 40 (Latino Mix 93.5)

=== New York ===
New York City

- WADO 1280 AM - Regional Mexican (Qué Buena 1280AM)
- WXNY-FM 96.3 FM - Spanish Top 40 (LA X 96.3)

=== Texas ===
Austin

- KLJA 107.7 FM - Spanish AC (Amor 107.7)
- KLQB 104.3 FM - Regional Mexican (Qué Buena 104.3)

Dallas/Fort Worth

- KAMV 107.1 FM - Spanish AC (Amor 107.1)
- KDXX 107.9 FM - Spanish Top 40 (Latino Mix 107.9)
- KLNO 94.1 FM - Regional Mexican (Qué Buena 94.1)

Houston

- KAMA-FM 104.9 FM - Spanish Top 40 (Latino Mix 104.9)
- KESS 93.3 FM - Norteño (Estéreo Latino 93.3)
- KLTN 102.9 FM - Regional Mexican (Qué Buena 102.9)
- KOVE-FM 106.5 FM - Spanish AC (Amor 106.5)

San Antonio

- KBBT 98.5 FM - Rhythmic CHR (The Beat 98.5)
- KMYO 95.1 FM - Spanish AC (Amor 95.1)
- KROM 92.9 FM - Regional Mexican (Qué Buena 92.9)
- KVBH 107.5 FM - Rhythmic AC (Vibe 107.5)

=== Nationwide ===
ONLINE ONLY on The Uforia App

- TUDN Radio: Spanish-language sports talk from the TUDN network. Available on the HD Subchannels of Ten Stations with Two Available on the App (WPPN, KLTN/KAMA-FM)
- Amor Celestial: Spanish Christian and Catholic programming
- Betty: Spanish ballads from the 1980s and ’90s, with some from '79 and 2000 titles
- Recuerdo: Spanish hits from the '60s, '70s, '80s, '90s and '00s, going up to 2010, with some songs from 1959 as well. Formerly on KRCD-FM
- ¡Kumbiazo!: "Cumbias Todo El Dia"
- Stream Tejano: As the name suggests, runs a Tejano format. Available on the HD subchannels of five stations in Texas (KLQB, KDXX, KLTN, KOVE-FM and KVBH)
- Uforia Music Artist: Only plays songs from the selected artist of the month, mainly Spanish performers
- Dr. César Lozano: Replay of "Por El Placer De Vivir"
- Uforia Rock: Spanish rock, available online and on the HD Radio subchannel of WRTO-FM
- El Bueno, La Mala, y El Feo - Replay of "El Bueno, La Mala, y El Feo"
- El Free-Guey Show - Replay of "El Free-Guey Show"
- La Chula y La Bestia - Replay of "La Chula y La Bestia"
- El Desayuno - Replay of "El Desayuno"
- Buena Vibra - Replay of "Buena Vibra"
- El Palo con Coco - Replay of "El Palo con Coco"
- La Gozadera New York - Replay of "La Gozadera"
- El Flow - Replay of "El Flow"
- Las Repegadas - Replay of "Las Repegadas"
- La Red Hispana
