= KQQK =

Radio station in Beaumont, Texas

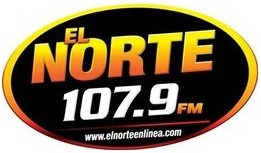
- Beaumont, Texas; United States
- Broadcast area: Greater Houston; Golden Triangle
- Frequency: 107.9 MHz (HD Radio)
- Branding: El Norte 107.9 FM

Programming
- Language: Spanish
- Format: Regional Mexican

Ownership
- Owner: MediaCo; (Estrella Radio License of Houston LLC)
- Sister stations: KNTE, KTJM, KZJL

History
- First air date: July 10, 1967
- Former call signs: KJET-FM (1967–1973); KWIC-FM (1973–1993); KXTJ (1993–2001)
- Former frequencies: 107.7 MHz (1967–1986)

Technical information
- Licensing authority: FCC
- Facility ID: 19087
- Class: C
- ERP: 90,000 watts
- HAAT: 565 m (1,854 ft)
- Transmitter coordinates: 30°1′1″N 94°32′47″W

Links
- Public license information: Public file; LMS
- Webcast: Listen Live/Escucha En Vivo
- Website: elnorte.estrellatv.com

KQQK (107.9 FM) is a commercial radio station licensed to Beaumont, Texas, United States, serving the Golden Triangle of Texas (Beaumont–Port Arthur–Orange) and part of Greater Houston. Owned by MediaCo, it carries a Regional Mexican radio format as "El Norte 107.9" with studios on Bering Drive in Houston and transmitter sited off Cleveland Street in Devers.

== History ==
=== Beaumont's "K-Jet" signs on FM sister ===
On July 10, 1967, the station signed on the air as KJET-FM. It was originally on 107.7 MHz, powered at only 5,000 watts, as the FM simulcast to "K-Jet" 1380 KJET (now licensed to Shenandoah and targeting Houston as KRCM).

KJET was a daytimer, required to be off the air at night. So KJET-FM carried its R&B programming for the African-American community after sunset. KJET-FM originally served only the Golden Triangle (Beaumont, Port Arthur and Orange) from a transmitter site at 4945 Fannett Rd. near Tyrrell Park in Beaumont.

=== KJET-FM's "Quick" flip to rock ===
After 6 years as the FM side to "K-Jet", KJET-FM changed its call sign to KWIC on March 5, 1973. It played the progressive rock format that many young FM's of the day had begun to program. The station rebranded as "Quick 108", a play on the new call letters of KWIC. Even though "108" was not an actual part of the licensed band (channel 300/107.9 MHz is the highest allocation allowed by law), most stations of the time period rounded up their setting to the next full number as it appeared on the older analog radio dials. KJET, Inc., which owned KWIC and KJET, filed paperwork to change its corporate name to Gibson Broadcasting Company, which was granted and finalized on October 23, 1973.

In November 1975, KWIC flipped to a disco format, which would evolve to top 40 by 1977. In 1985, it returned to album rock to fill the void when KZOM flipped to adult contemporary as KKMY the year before.

In 1986, the Federal Communications Commission (FCC) granted KWIC a significant upgrade to Class C1 status at the maximum 100,000 watts from the original Fannett site. It required moving its operating channel up one notch to 107.9 MHz. This was done in conjunction with then KGOL at 107.3 in Lake Jackson, Texas also moving up one channel to 107.5 MHz, in order for that station to compete in the Houston area as a classic rock station. The signal upgrade was put to KWIC's advantage as well.

=== A "Quick" move west ===
In 1989, KWIC was granted an FCC construction permit to move to the 2,000 foot Devers tower and provide service to Houston. The upgrade was finalized in 1991 and the station began including Houston in its station identification.

On January 17, 1992, KWIC and sister station KKFH were forced off the air due to the financial problems of owner Modern World Media, whose principal shareholder was former Texas Governor Mark White. White was ordered to transfer his shares in the station to former presidential candidate Ross Perot, but he instead attempted to sell the station outright to Stephen G. Allison, then-owner of KDGE in Dallas, who likely would have made KWIC a modern rock station targeting Houston. Once the sale fell through, White sold his shares to Perot and the station was sold to El Dorado Broadcasting, a Spanish-language media company in which Perot had financial interests.

In July 1993, the station returned to the air as KXTJ. It began by stunting with a wheel of formats, a new one each day. Instead of an entire format though, KXTJ aired only one song from each genre, such as the Spin Doctors' "Two Princes" and Garth Brooks' "Low Places". and played the song over and over in a loop. Interspersed between the repeated song was a pre-recorded disc jockey, with a heavy Mexican accent, alerting listeners that the station was taking suggestions for the new format and gave a Houston telephone number for listeners to call and make format suggestions. After 2 weeks of stunting, a format was finally settled upon, launching as the second Tejano-formatted station within the Houston market as "Super Tejano 108." Super Tejano 108 attempted to capture listeners from longtime fellow bi-lingual Tejano powerhouse 106.5 KQQK Galveston.

=== La Nueva "Z" ===
In 1995, the owners of KQQK, El Dorado Communications, outright purchased KXTJ, resulting in the two Tejano stations simulcasting the same programming. Within a year, KXTJ was split off of the simulcast. It began broadcasting a Regional Mexican format, branded as "La Nueva Z".

=== KQQK moves from 106.5 ===
In 2001, KQQK was moved to 107.9 after 106.5 was purchased by Hispanic Broadcasting Corporation (predecessor to Univision), As a part of this format shuffle, HBC moved its highly successful "K-Love" format from the two rimshot signals of 93.3 & 104.9 FM to the superior 106.5 signal.

=== "XO" and "El Norte" ===
KQQK and sister station KXGJ Bay City began simulcasting a Latin Pop format as "XO" in 2001. In 2010, the two began simulcasting the programming of KNTE-FM El Campo as "El Norte". This occurred in anticipation of KNTE-FM's pending sale to the KSBJ Foundation. Once 96.9 was divested, 107.9 and 101.7 remained in simulcast, with 101.7 assuming the KNTE call letters.

The simulcast lasted until 2014, when 101.7 broke from the simulcast to relaunch independently as "Baila 101.7". At this point, 101.7 changed partners to simulcast its AM sister station 850 KEYH Houston, playing Classic Regional Mexican music and formatted "La Ranchera".

KQQK 107.9

XO Radio

== Callsign and moniker history ==
- KJET-FM - 9/7/1967 [K-Jet]
- KWIC - 3/5/1973 [Quick 108]
- KWIC-FM - 5/16/1986 [Quick 108, 108 the Rock]
- KXTJ - 6/1/1993 [Super Tejano 108, Radio Impacto, La Nueva Z]
- KQQK - 7/30/2001 [107.9 KQQK, XO 107.9, El Norte 107.9]
