= Amor (Emmanuel Cortes song) =

2023 song by Emmanuel Cortes

- Cover art of the official remix with Santa Fe Klan

Single by Emmanuel Cortes

from the album Memorias <3
- Released: August 5, 2024
- Genre: Norteño; cumbia
- Length: 3:22
- Label: RC
- Songwriter: Emmanuel Cortés

Emmanuel Cortes singles chronology
"No Me Equivoco" (2024)	"Amor" (2024)	"Mami" (2024)

Music video
- "Amor" on YouTube
- "Amor (Remix)" on YouTube

"Amor" is a song by American singer Emmanuel Cortes, released as the lead single from his debut studio album Memorias <3 (2023) on August 5, 2024. It was a sleeper hit and became his breakout song after gaining traction on the video-sharing app TikTok in 2024. An official remix of the song with Mexican singer and rapper Santa Fe Klan was released on April 24, 2025.

== Composition ==
"Amor" is norteño and cumbia song with "smooth tenor vocals" and romantic lyrics from Cortes.

== Promotion ==
In mid-2024, the song achieved significant popularity on TikTok. By the end of September 2024, it was used in nearly 500,000 videos of couples of all ages dancing to the song.

== Remix ==
The official remix of the song with Santa Fe Klan was released on 24 April 2025 with an accompanying music video. On the remix, Santa Fe Klan fuses cumbia with rap and sings about unrequited love. The video was directed by Jhone Sanz and filmed in the streets of Guadalajara. It sees the artists driving through the city at night, while a romantic story unfolds.

== Charts ==
=== Weekly charts ===
Weekly chart performance for "Amor"
Chart (2025–2026)	Peak position
Bolivia (Billboard)	10
Chile (Billboard)	22
Ecuador (Billboard)	11
Mexico (Billboard)	15
Peru (Billboard)	7
US Billboard Hot 100	88
US Hot Latin Songs (Billboard)	6

=== Year-end charts ===
Year-end chart performance for "Amor"
Chart (2025)	Position
US Hot Latin Songs (Billboard)	37
