= KJOZ =

Radio station in Conroe–Houston, Texas

- Conroe, Texas; United States
- Broadcast area: Greater Houston
- Frequency: 880 kHz
- Branding: The X 106.1

Programming
- Format: Variety hits

Ownership
- Owner: Hector Guevara Ministry Corp.; (Latino Broadcasting Corporation)
- Sister stations: KEYH

History
- First air date: May 25, 1951
- Former call signs: KMCO (1951–1974); KIKR (1974–1991); KJOJ (1991–2012)
- Former frequencies: 900 kHz (1951–1985)

Technical information
- Licensing authority: FCC
- Facility ID: 20625
- Class: B
- Power: 10,000 watts (day); 1,000 watts (night)
- Transmitter coordinates: 30°17′38″N 95°25′55″W
- Translator: 106.1 K291CE (Houston)
- Repeater: 107.5-2 KGLK-HD2

Links
- Public license information: Public file; LMS
- Website: thex1061.com

KJOZ (880 AM) is a radio station, paired with 1 FM relay translator. Licensed to Conroe, Texas, KJOZ primarily serves the northern Houston, Texas metropolitan area. The station broadcasts a variety hits format.

== History ==
=== As 900 KMCO ===
The station first signed on the air on May 25, 1951, using the call sign KMCO (which stood for Montgomery County) and broadcasting on the frequency of 900 kHz. It operated as a full-service, community-focused Country and Western music station, serving the Conroe area north of Houston. The station's original owner was Reagan Smith & Fred Perry Sr. KMCO played a significant role in local culture, at one point operating its studios out of a historic building in downtown Conroe. Houston-area radio personality Mary McCoy began her career at KMCO in 1951.

=== Owen family purchases KMCO; becomes KIKR ===
In 1974, the station was purchased by Steve Owen, and the call sign was changed to KIKR, rebranding the station as "Kicker." During this time, it was co-owned with an FM sister station, KNRO (106.9 FM). KIKR's frequency was changed from 900 kHz to its current position at 880 kHz in 1985, coinciding with a power increase to 10 kilowatts during daytime hours, which allowed it to reach the wider Houston metropolitan area. It was co-owned with KNRO at 106.9 FM (currently classic rock KHPT "The Eagle") during this period. The facility was moved to 880 kHz in 1985, after the FM was sold, and upgraded to 10 kilowatts during daytime hours.

=== Jimmy Swaggart's "Joy of Jesus" ===
KIKR was sold to Jimmy Swaggart Ministries in 1991, resulting in the change to the KJOJ call sign (standing for "Joy Of Jesus").

Once sold to the Swaggart Ministry, 880 became the simulcast partner of KJOJ-FM's Christian ministry format, which had moved from 106.9 to 103.3 a year earlier, due to 106.9's sale by the Swaggart ministries in 1990. 880's 10 kilowatt signal allowed the ministry to remain over the air in the northern areas of the Houston metro, opposite of the 103.3 signal which is located southwest of the metro.

The last General Manager of KJOJ during its religious format and before its move into Houston was Kathy Watson and last Program Director was Gary Johnson.

=== Swaggart sells KJOJ, KJOJ-FM ===
In 1998, KJOJ moved its studio located in The Woodlands to the Clear Channel studios in Houston after being sold by the Swaggart ministry.

In May 2001, KJOJ began to simulcast KTJM 98.5 and its former sister KJOJ-FM as Rhythmic Oldies "Houston's Jammin Hits", along with KQUE 1230 AM.

=== Liberman acquisition ===
In July 2001, KJOJ and its FM sister were sold to Liberman Broadcasting, which resulted in both KJOJ and the FM counterpart simulcasting "La Raza" with 1230 & 98.5.

In April 2010, Liberman leased KJOJ's 10 kW signal to Rahan Sidiqqui for Hum Tum City's South Asian programming. After several months IDing as simply "880 KJOJ" with Siddiqui's programming, it returned to simulcasting Houston's 1230 KQUE as Regional Mexican "Radio Ranchito" then as "La Ranchera".

=== KJOJ becomes KJOZ; Radio Aleluya debuts ===
The station was sold to Daij Media, LLC in 2012. Upon the consummation of the sale, the call sign was officially changed to KJOZ to distinguish it from the former KJOJ-FM located in Freeport, Texas. The new ownership switched the station to the Radio Aleluya Spanish Christian preaching and music format. Daij Media then switched KJOZ to Radio Aleluya Spanish Christian preaching and music programming from the Aleluya Broadcasting Network.

=== 880 returns to English language; "Where Diversity Finds Its Voice" ===
On April 13, 2015, KJOZ dropped Spanish Christian programming and relaunched as an urban talk station with the slogan "Where diversity finds its voice."

By November, KJOZ dropped most of its talk programming to become a de facto replacement for the original KCOH, featuring many of the former KCOH personalities including Michael Harris and Don Samuel.

=== Radio Aleluya returns ===
On April 8, 2016, Urban Talk & Oldies was dropped from 880 KJOZ, returning to the previous Spanish Christian programming of owner Radio Aleluya.

=== La Calle moves; KJOZ gains an FM translator ===
In 2017, the station adopted the Spanish Tropical format, branding as "La Calle" (The Street), and gained an FM translator at 92.5 MHz (K223CW), which significantly extended its coverage into Houston proper. The station briefly rebranded as "Rumba 92.5/880" in late 2019.

In 2021, ownership transferred to Hector Guevara Ministry Corp. In June 2023, the station transitioned to a Regional Mexican format branded as "La Grande 104.5," paired with a new translator on 104.5 MHz (K283CH). However, as of March 2025, the station flipped back to the Spanish Tropical format under the familiar "La Calle" brand. The primary for translator 92.5 K223CW was moved from KCOH to KJOZ, moving the Tropical "La Calle" format from KCOH to KJOZ as well.

=== Rumba 92.5/880 ===
On December 6, 2019, KJOZ rebranded as "Rumba 92.5/880".

Effective November 3, 2021, Daij Media swapped KJOZ to Hector Guevara Ministry Corp. in exchange for the licenses to translators K243BO and K254DU.

=== La Grande 104.5 ===
In June 2023, KJOZ flipped to regional Mexican under the branding "La Grande 104.5", relayed by translator K283CH on 104.5 in Houston.

=== La Calle returns ===
In March 2025, KJOZ flipped back to Spanish tropical under the "La Calle" branding.

=== The X 106.1 ===
On August 31, 2026, KJOZ changed their format from Spanish tropical to variety hits, branded as "The X 106.1". Its playlist goes as far as to include album versions of songs and even songs that were not domestically released as singles in the United States.

== Translator ==
Broadcast translator for KJOZ
Call sign	Frequency	City of license	FID	ERP (W)	Class	FCC info
K291CE	106.1 FM	Houston, Texas	147704	45	D	LMS
