= KZJL =

Television station in Houston

- Houston, Texas; United States
- Channels: Digital: 21 (UHF); Virtual: 61
- Branding: Estrella TV Houston; Noticias 61 (newscast)

Programming
- Affiliations: 61.1: Estrella TV; for others, see § Subchannels

Ownership
- Owner: MediaCo; (Estrella Television License of Houston LLC)
- Sister stations: KTJM, KQQK, KNTE

History
- First air date: June 3, 1995
- Former channel numbers: Analog: 61 (UHF, 1995–2009); Digital: 44 (UHF, 2003–2019)
- Former affiliations: Shop at Home (1995–2001); Spanish Independent (2001–2009)

Technical information
- Licensing authority: FCC
- Facility ID: 69531
- ERP: 880 kW
- HAAT: 595 m (1,952 ft)
- Transmitter coordinates: 29°33′45.2″N 95°30′35.9″W

Links
- Public license information: Public file; LMS
- Website: www.estrellatv.com

KZJL (channel 61) is a television station in Houston, Texas, United States, broadcasting the Spanish-language network Estrella TV. It is owned by MediaCo and is sister to four radio stations. KZJL's studios are located on Bering Drive on the city's southwest side, and its transmitter is located near Missouri City, in unincorporated northeastern Fort Bend County.

== History ==
The station first signed on the air on June 3, 1995, as an affiliate of home shopping network Shop at Home. In 2001, the station was purchased by Liberman Broadcasting (which was renamed Estrella Media on February 3, 2020, following a corporate reorganization of the company under private equity firm HPS Investment Partners, LLC) and became a Spanish-language independent station; on September 14, 2009, KZJL became a charter owned-and-operated station of Liberman's Spanish-language broadcast network Estrella TV. Estrella Media was in turn absorbed into MediaCo on November 10, 2025.

== Technical information ==
=== Subchannels ===
The station's signal is multiplexed:

Subchannels of KZJL
Subchannel	Res.	Short name	Programming
61.1	720p	KZJL-HD	Estrella TV
61.2	720p	KZJL-2	Estrella News
61.3	480i	JTV	Jewelry TV Español
61.4	480i	SHOP-LC	Shop LC
61.5	720p	POSI-TV	Positiv
61.6	480p	Confess	Confess

=== Analog-to-digital conversion ===
KZJL ended regular programming on its analog signal, over UHF channel 61, on June 12, 2009, as part of federally mandated transition from analog to digital television. The station's digital signal remained on its pre-transition UHF channel 44, using virtual channel 61.
