= KQUE-FM =

- Bay City, Texas; United States
- Broadcast area: Wharton County, Matagorda County
- Frequency: 88.1 MHz
- Branding: Radio Aleluya

Programming
- Format: Religious
- Affiliations: Aleluya Broadcasting Network

Ownership
- Owner: Roberto and Ruben Villarreal; (Aleluya Broadcast Network)
- Sister stations: KCOH, KQUE, KRCM, KBRZ KBRZ-FM, KMIC

History
- Former call signs: KFRT (2004–2005); KEDR (2005–2015)

Technical information
- Licensing authority: FCC
- Facility ID: 91338
- Class: C2
- ERP: 3,600 watts
- HAAT: 437.0 meters (1,433.7 ft)
- Transmitter coordinates: 28°48′3″N 96°7′32″W
- Translators: K287CK (105.3 MHz, El Campo)

Links
- Public license information: Public file; LMS
- Website: www.radioaleluya.org

KQUE-FM (88.1 FM) is a radio station broadcasting a Spanish religious format. Licensed to Bay City, Texas, United States, the station is currently owned by Roberto and Ruben Villarreal, through licensee Aleluya Broadcast Network.
