= KNTE (FM) =

Radio station in Bay City, Texas

Coordinates: 28.8002°N 96.1258°W

- Bay City, Texas; United States
- Broadcast area: Victoria, Texas
- Frequency: 101.7 MHz
- Branding: La Raza 98.5 y 101.7

Programming
- Language: Spanish
- Format: Regional Mexican

Ownership
- Owner: MediaCo; (Estrella Radio License of Houston LLC)
- Sister stations: KTJM, KQQK, KZJL

History
- First air date: September 25, 1995
- Former call signs: KXGJ (1995–2012)
- Call sign meaning: El Norte (previous branding)

Technical information
- Licensing authority: FCC
- Facility ID: 2131
- Class: C1
- ERP: 35,000 watts
- HAAT: 450 meters (1,480 ft)
- Repeater: 98.5 KTJM (Port Arthur)

Links
- Public license information: Public file; LMS
- Website: La Raza 98.5/101.7

KNTE (101.7 FM) is a commercial radio station licensed to Bay City, Texas. The station broadcasts a Regional Mexican format simulcast with KTJM in Port Arthur, and is owned by Estrella Radio License of Houston LLC, a subsidiary of MediaCo, formerly Estrella Media.

== History ==
The station began broadcasting on September 25, 1995, holding the call sign KXGJ and airing a country music format branded "Pure Country". In 2002, Liberman Broadcasting purchased the station, along with KIOX-FM in El Campo, Texas, for $3.15 million. The station began airing a tropical music format. Its ERP was later increased to 35 kilowatts, and it began targeting SW Houston and Fort Bend County. On April 3, 2012, the station's call sign was changed to KNTE. On July 11, 2014, KNTE changed its format to regional Mexican, branded as "La Ranchera 101.7".

On December 14, 2020, sister station KJOJ-FM in Freeport, Texas suffered catastrophic failure, resulting in that facility going silent. KNTE was then changed from simulcasting Houston station KEYH "La Ranchera" to simulcasting KTJM, in order to replace most of KJOJ-FM's over the air coverage area.
