= KRCM =

Coordinates: 30°07′40″N 95°57′35″W

- Shenandoah, Texas; United States
- Broadcast area: Greater Houston
- Frequency: 1380 kHz
- Branding: Jesús Radio

Programming
- Language: Spanish
- Format: Spanish Religious

Ownership
- Owner: Daij Media, LLC
- Sister stations: KABA-FM, KBRZ, KFTG, KMIC, KQUE, KQUE-FM KUZN

History
- First air date: June 30, 1947
- Former call signs: KPBX (1947–1953); KJIM (1953–1954); KJET (1954–1990); KWIC (1990–1991); KKFH (1991–1993); KZXT (1993–1995); KJUS (1995–1998); KWBK (1998)

Technical information
- Licensing authority: FCC
- Facility ID: 14228
- Class: D
- Power: 22,000 watts (day); 50 watts (night)
- Translator: 99.9 K260DD (Houston)
- Repeater: KZHO-LD 38.8 (Houston)

Links
- Public license information: Public file; LMS
- Website: jesusradio.fm

KRCM (1380 AM) is a radio station licensed to Shenandoah, Texas, United States, serving much of Greater Houston. The station broadcasts a Spanish Religious format as "Jesús Radio" and is owned by Daij Media, LLC.

== History ==
KRCM originated in Beaumont, Texas, as KPBX in 1947.

During the 1950s and 1960s, KRCM was known as KJET, a blues and R&B station. It was the only black station in Beaumont. Johnny Winter said that he "spent hours each day listening to KJET" and it heavily influenced his music styles. KJET (known on as air "K-Jet") continued through the 1980s, even as it faced competition from both FM operators and KALO, which had dropped country during the decade to become the Triangle's second Black targeted station as "Kay-Lo".

The facility relocated to a site east of Tamina Road in Shenandoah, TX in 2007.

As of 18 January 2017, KRCM has received the grant officially increasing the daytime power level from 2.8 to 22 kilowatts, while the night power has decreased to 50 watts, down from 60.
