= KAMV =

Radio station in Benbrook, Texas

Coordinates: 32.586°N 97.831°W

- Benbrook, Texas; United States
- Broadcast area: Western areas of the Dallas–Fort Worth metroplex
- Frequency: 107.1 MHz (HD Radio)
- Branding: Amor 107.1

Programming
- Language: Spanish
- Format: Spanish Adult contemporary
- Subchannels: HD2: TUDN Radio

Ownership
- Owner: Uforia Audio Network; (Tichenor License Corporation)
- Sister stations: KDXX; KLNO; KUVN-DT; KSTR-DT

History
- First air date: January 1990
- Former call signs: KFII (1987–1988, CP); KYOT-FM (1988–1992); KCYT (1992–1995); KCKK (1995); KMRT-FM (1995–1998); KDXT (1998–2003); KDXX (2003–2012); KFZO (2012–2013); KESS-FM (2013–2025); KQBU-FM (2025–2026)
- Former frequencies: 106.7 MHz (1990-2002)
- Call sign meaning: Amor

Technical information
- Licensing authority: FCC
- Facility ID: 21599
- Class: C1
- ERP: 74,000 watts
- HAAT: 320 meters (1,050 ft)

Links
- Public license information: Public file; LMS
- Webcast: Listen live
- Website: Amor 107.1 Online

KAMV (107.1 MHz) is a commercial radio station licensed to Benbrook, Texas, United States, serving communities in the western sections of the Dallas–Fort Worth metroplex. It is owned and operated by the Uforia Audio Network, a division of TelevisaUnivision. It broadcasts a Spanish-language adult contemporary radio format.

KAMV has an effective radiated power (ERP) of 100,000 watts, the maximum for non-grandfathered FM stations. The transmitter is off Tin Top Estates Road in Horseshoe Bend. KAMV broadcasts using HD Radio technology.

== History ==
This facility began broadcasting as KYOT-FM 106.7 in Granbury, Texas, in January 1990. It broadcast a big band and adult standards format from a transmitter in Erath County, 9 miles (14 kilometres) from Bluff Dale. Its original owner was David Carter, a former KTVT employee and owner of the Johnson County News newspaper. The station had its studios at the transmitter site and business offices in Fort Worth. The call sign was changed to KCYT in 1992. After KAAM (1310 AM) flipped from big band to sports in 1993, KCYT was the only local station in the format.

In 1995, Carter sold the station to Heftel Broadcasting, which flipped it to a Tejano music format. Heftel owned two other facilities locally. Heftel paired it with stations at 99.1 FM and 107.9 FM to create Kick, a regional trimulcast serving areas from Waco to Wichita Falls.

When Hispanic Broadcasting Company bought the 94.1 MHz facility and flipped it to KLNO "Estéreo Latino", it was originally simulcast on 106.7 until 2000, when the stations other than KLNO flipped to a soft adult contemporary format known as Amor. In 2002, Hispanic Broadcasting Company moved the station from Granbury to Benbrook at 107.1 MHz. The change was part of a 17-station shuffle in Texas and Oklahoma that moved KXGM into the market. The Amor format was simulcast on 107.9 until January 2003.

The station had been branded as "Estereo Latino" until February 19, 2009, when "La Que Buena" was moved from 107.9 FM (KESS-FM) and simulcast on 99.1 FM (KFZO). The reggaeton station known as "La Kalle" was then moved to 107.9 FM and retooled to Latin pop/CHR.

On June 23, 2011, KDXX changed its format from a simulcast of Regional Mexican-formatted KFZO, by known as La Jefa, to Spanish adult hits, branded as "Recuerdo 107.1". A year later, Univision Radio broke up the simulcast and moved the La Jefa format back to the 107.1 frequency, which changed call signs from KDXX to KFZO.

On July 29, 2013, KFZO flipped to a simulcast of 99.1, by then Spanish AC station KDXX. The following month, on August 9, 2013, KFZO swapped call signs with KESS. On September 28, 2014, 107.1 rebranded as "Latino Mix" as part of the implementation of the brand in seven markets.

On October 8, 2025, Univision flipped the format of KQBU-FM 93.3 in the Houston market to "Estéreo Latino 93.3". It moved the KESS call sign to that facility and KQBU-FM to Benbrook. The KAMV call sign was adopted on July 25, 2026, and KQBU-FM moved again to Univision's 105.1 MHz in Wickenburg, Arizona; the change was accompanied by a break with the simulcast with KDXX (107.9 FM) and a stunt loop of Emmanuel Cortes's "Amor", ahead of a relaunch of the station with a Spanish-language adult contemporary format and a return to the "Amor" branding, which occurred at 11:55 a.m. on July 27.
