= KESS =

Radio station in Texas, United States

- Port Arthur, Texas; United States
- Broadcast area: Golden Triangle; Greater Houston
- Frequency: 93.3 MHz (HD Radio)
- Branding: Estereo Latino 93.3

Programming
- Language: Spanish
- Format: Norteno

Ownership
- Owner: Uforia Audio Network; (Univision Houston Local Media)
- Sister stations: KAMA-FM, KFTH-DT, KLTN, KOVE-FM, KXLN-DT

History
- First air date: September 11, 1959
- Former call signs: KFMP (1959–1969); KCAW-FM (1969–1974); KYKR-FM (1974–1992); KLTN (1992–1998); KOVE-FM (1998–2001); KQBU-FM (2001–2007, 2009–2025); KPTY (2007–2009)
- Call sign meaning: Estereo Latino

Technical information
- Licensing authority: FCC
- Facility ID: 25583
- Class: C
- ERP: 100,000 watts
- HAAT: 595 m (1,952 ft)
- Transmitter coordinates: 30°3′5″N 94°31′37″W
- Repeater: 106.5 KOVE-HD3 (Galveston)

Links
- Public license information: Public file; LMS
- Webcast: Listen live
- Website: univision.com/estereo-latino-933

KESS (93.3 FM, "Estereo Latino 93.3") is a commercial radio station licensed to Port Arthur, Texas, United States, and serving Houston, Beaumont and Port Arthur. Owned by the Uforia Audio Network, it features a Spanish language Norteno format, with Spanish-language broadcasts of the Houston Astros, the Houston Rockets and Houston Dynamo FC. KESS's studios are in the Univision Building at 5100 Southwest Freeway in Uptown Houston and the transmitter is in Devers, Texas.

== History ==
=== KFMP, KYKR, KLTN ===
KESS first began broadcasting on September 11, 1959, under the call sign KFMP-FM, and originally owned by Henry Diehl, under the licensed business name of Triangle Broadcasting Company. It was sold to Felix and James Joynt (d.b.a. KWEN Broadcasting Company) on June 18, 1969, becoming the FM sister to 1510 KCAW Port Arthur, and having its own callsign changed to KCAW-FM.

The call sign was changed to KYKR-FM on October 1, 1974, rebranding as "Kicker 93" and beginning the legacy of KYKR on the FM dial in the Triangle. Steve Hicks purchased the AM & FM facilities in 1980.

In 1989, Hicks proposed to move the FM signal off of the AM's tower in Vidor, Texas, and relocate it further west to Devers, Texas in order to rimshot Houston with its signal. A Construction Permit for the move was granted on October 10, 1989, and was licensed for operation at the new site on October 23, 1991.

On July 2, 1992, the call sign was changed to KLTN, after the move from Port Arthur to Devers, as "Estereo Latino 93.3". On June 25, 1998, the station was then changed to "K-Love 93.3 y 104.9", the first simulcast with 104.9 FM (now KAMA-FM) in Houston, and assigned the new calls of KOVE-FM.

On July 30, 2001, the call sign was changed to KQBU-FM with the moniker "La Que Buena 93.3" for the first run of the Regional Mexican format on this frequency.

=== Party 93.3 ===
On December 4, 2007, KQBU "Que Buena 93.3", a Regional Mexican outlet, became the new home of the "Party", which relocated from 104.9 to make room for the newly launched KAMA "Amor 104.9". After that switch was made, "Party 93.3" added the syndicated Big Boy's Neighborhood, with Big Boy, Luscious Liz, and Tattoo. The KPTY call sign was officially moved to 93.3 FM on December 11, 2007.

On July 5, 2008, the station stopped targeting the Greater Houston area. Everything that the station had that referenced Houston were immediately dropped, including its slogan, and moved its broadcasting studios from Southwest Houston to Beaumont. The move was noticed in the ratings, as KPTY, which had good numbers in the Houston Arbitrons, began to dip after the frequency switch. In the process, it lost a fraction of listeners due to the 93.3 signal not covering all of the Houston metro.

=== Return to "Que Buena 93.3" ===
On February 27, 2009, Univision's Houston cluster announced that it was letting go most of its employees. KPTY would unfortunately be the biggest casualty of this move as the entire airstaff was pink-slipped and the station went jockless. At 10 P.M. on February 28, the station went live for a nightclub broadcast as scheduled. Many of the personalities that saw the format through its run from its early days at 100.7 and then later on 104.9, were on hand to send off "Houston's Party Station."

At the end of the live broadcast at 2 A.M., the station returned to Regional Mexican and its former Que Buena 93.3 moniker on March 1. The call sign was officially changed back to KQBU-FM on March 10, 2009.

=== Latino Mix 104.9 y 93.3 ===
On December 1, 2017, KQBU-FM changed the format from Regional Mexican Que Buena 93.3 to a simulcast of Spanish CHR-formatted KAMA-FM 104.9 FM Deer Park. KQBU-FM's change provided a Spanish CHR format to the Golden Triangle as well as serving the northern, eastern, and southeastern areas from Houston, which the 104.9 signal cannot reach.

=== TUDN Radio Houston ===
On September 27, 2021, KQBU-FM changed the format from a simulcast of Spanish CHR-formatted KAMA-FM to a simulcast of Spanish sports-formatted KLAT 1010 AM Houston, branded as "Your Station Of Champions". The simulcast lasted until KLAT was split of from KQBU-FM in favor of changing to a Spanish AC/Regional Mexican format known as “10-10 AM” in mid-December 2024, which KQBU-FM remains as a TUDN Radio Affiliate after the split.

=== Return of Estereo Latino ===
On October 8, 2025, KQBU-FM changed their format from Spanish sports TUDN Radio 93.3 to Norteno, branded as "Estereo Latino 93.3" under new KESS call letters. It has reverted to its original name from 1992 to 1998 after the format moved to KLTN, then dropping the name in 2018. The station focuses on 90s Norteño and Cumbias. The current KQBU callsigns moved to 107.1 Benbrook, TX.
