= KTJM =

Radio station in Port Arthur, Texas

- Port Arthur, Texas; United States
- Broadcast area: Greater Houston; Golden Triangle
- Frequency: 98.5 MHz
- Branding: La Raza 98.5 y 101.7

Programming
- Language: Spanish
- Format: Regional Mexican

Ownership
- Owner: MediaCo; (Estrella Radio License of Houston LLC)
- Sister stations: KNTE, KQQK, KZJL

History
- First air date: May 14, 1963
- Former call signs: KPAC-FM (1963–1978); KHYS (1978–1999)
- Call sign meaning: The Jam (previous brand)

Technical information
- Licensing authority: FCC
- Facility ID: 20489
- Class: C
- ERP: 100,000 watts
- HAAT: 596 meters (1,955 ft)
- Transmitter coordinates: 30°1′2.2″N 94°32′47.9″W
- Repeater: 101.7 KNTE (Bay City)

Links
- Public license information: Public file; LMS
- Website: La Raza 98.5/101.7

KTJM (98.5 FM) is a commercial radio station licensed to Port Arthur, Texas. It is owned by MediaCo and airs a Regional Mexican format. The studios and offices are located at 3000 Bering Drive in Southwest Houston. Programming is simulcast with sister station KNTE in Bay City, Texas.

KTJM has an effective radiated power (ERP) of 100,000 watts, the highest permitted for non-grandfathered FM stations in the U.S. The transmitter is on Cleveland Street in Devers, Texas. The tower gives KTJM a height above average terrain (HAAT) of 596 metres (1,955 ft). With the tall tower located roughly halfway between Houston and Beaumont, KTJM is able to cover both radio markets.

== History ==
The station signed on in 1963 as KPAC-FM, owned by Port Arthur College, simulcasting KPAC. It operated with a 960-watt signal on a 500-foot tower it shared with 1250 AM. Afterwards, KPAC-FM became an automated Beautiful Music station, playing instrumental cover versions of popular songs, as well as Broadway and Hollywood show tunes.

The station changed its call sign to KHYS in early 1978, flipping to an album rock format after the AM and FM pair were bought by San Antonio based-Clear Channel Communications. Near the end of the year, the format changed again, this time to disco as "Kiss 98.5." With disco's popularity waning in the late 70s, KHYS evolved to urban contemporary and found success in the Golden Triangle.

In 1988, a 2,000-foot tower was built near Devers for the station to compete in the Houston market, which put KHYS in head-to-head competition with KMJQ, "Majic 102".

KYOK 1590 AM flipped from Gospel to Rap as "Yo 1590 Raps!" in February 1991, leading KHYS to change to "Y98.5", with the slogan "Y98.5, the best variety of Hits and Dusties."

In 1993, KJOJ-FM and KYOK began simulcasting "Y98.5". KJOJ-FM continued to simulcast with 98.5 until December 2020. On March 8, 1995, the simulcast flipped full time to Smooth Jazz, known as "Smooth FM 98.5 and 103.3".

On February 24, 1997, after stunting with continuous play of the song Kiss by Prince, the station's format changed to Rhythmic Contemporary as "Kiss 98-5, Kiss Again 103-3"."KHYS 98.5 Port Arthur, TX 28 March 1998". The stations targeted the Hispanic youth market by playing heavy doses of Latin Freestyle and House music, mimicking the style of WPOW Power 96 in Miami. In June 1998, the "Kiss 98-5, Kiss Again 103-3" format was tweaked again to rival 104.1 KRBE, by playing Rock and Pop based Top 40.

On January 1, 1999, the station jumped on the Rhythmic Oldies bandwagon as "98.5 The Jam". The call letters were changed to KTJM to match the new branding, becoming only the third set of call letters assigned to the facility since its sign on.

From 1999 to 2001, the station's moniker changed to "Houston's Jammin' Oldies," then to "Houston's Jammin' Hits", accompanied by a slight tweak in the playlist each time.

In July 2001, the station flipped to the current Regional Mexican "La Raza" format after being bought by Liberman Broadcasting. In 2019, Liberman ran into financial problems and declared Chapter 11. After reorganization, the corporate name changed to Estrella Media.
