= KBRZ (AM) =

- Missouri City, Texas; United States
- Broadcast area: Greater Houston
- Frequency: 1460 kHz
- Branding: Sangeet Radio

Programming
- Language: Hindi
- Format: South Asian/Desi Music and Talk

Ownership
- Owner: Daij Media, LLC.; (Roberto Ruben Villarreal)
- Sister stations: KMIC, KQUE, KRCM

History
- First air date: October 3, 1952
- Call sign meaning: Brazoria County

Technical information
- Licensing authority: FCC
- Facility ID: 12156
- Class: D
- Power: 5,000 watts (day); 125 watts (night)
- Transmitter coordinates: 29°33′52″N 95°42′6″W
- Translators: 92.5 K223DH (Houston); 95.1 K236AR (Missouri City)

Links
- Public license information: Public file; LMS
- Webcast: Listen live
- Website: sangeetradio.com

KBRZ (1460 AM) is a commercial radio station licensed to Missouri City, Texas, United States, and serving much of Greater Houston. Operated by Sangeet Radio and owned by Daij Media, LLC, the station airs a South Asian format, targeting listeners originally from India, Pakistan and Bangladesh.

KBRZ is additionally related over low-power FM translators K236AR (95.1 FM) in Missouri City and K223DH (92.5 FM) in Houston.

== History ==
On October 3, 1952, KBRZ first signed on the air. It was owned by Brazosport Broadcasting Company and primarily served Brazoria County with local news and sports coverage, and a middle of the road music format. It was originally a daytimer broadcasting at 500 watts, licensed to Freeport, Texas, and required to sign-off at sunset to protect other radio stations on AM 1460.

In the 1990s, it got authorization to broadcast around the clock, at 214 watts between sunset and sunrise.

After the death of its owner, J.C. Stallings, the facility was silenced and sold in 2001 to Aleluya Christian Broadcasting, Inc., for $700,000. The station began carrying Christian programming. In 2008, Aleluya Broadcasting got FCC permission to move KBRZ closer to Houston, to serve the larger audience in and around that city. The station was relicensed to Missouri City, Texas. The daytime power remained at 5,000 watts but the nighttime power was reduced to 125 watts.

In 2017, the station was leased to Saeed Gaddi to air his Sangeet Radio service, specializing in South Asian or "Desi" music and talk.
