= KBRZ-FM =

- Victoria, Texas; United States
- Frequency: 89.3 MHz
- Branding: Radio Aleluya

Programming
- Format: Spanish Religious

Ownership
- Owner: Aleluya Broadcasting Network

Technical information
- Licensing authority: FCC
- Facility ID: 18756
- Class: C3
- ERP: 9,500 watts
- HAAT: 115 meters (377 ft)
- Transmitter coordinates: 29.5646°N 95.7018°W

Links
- Public license information: Public file; LMS
- Website: radioaleluya.org

KBRZ-FM (89.3 FM) is a radio station licensed to Victoria, Texas, United States. The station broadcasts a Spanish Religious format and is owned by Aleluya Broadcasting Network.
