= KFNC =

- Mont Belvieu, Texas; United States
- Broadcast area: Greater Houston; Golden Triangle
- Frequency: 97.5 MHz
- Branding: ESPN 97.5/92.5

Programming
- Language: English
- Format: Sports
- Affiliations: ESPN Radio; Houston Dynamo FC; Sugar Land Space Cowboys; Texas A&M Sports Network

Ownership
- Owner: David Gow; (Gow Media, LLC)
- Sister stations: KGOW

History
- First air date: March 1, 1948
- Former call signs: KRIC (1948–1981); KAYD (1981–1995); KAYD-FM (1995–2002); KKTT (2002); KRWP (2002–2005); KIOL (2005)
- Call sign meaning: FM News Channel (previous format)

Technical information
- Licensing authority: FCC
- Facility ID: 52407
- Class: C
- ERP: 100,000 watts
- HAAT: 597.3 meters (1,960 ft)
- Transmitter coordinates: 29°41′52″N 94°24′9″W
- Translator: 92.5 K223CW (Houston)
- Repeater: 97.9 KBXX-HD2 (Houston)

Links
- Public license information: Public file; LMS
- Webcast: Listen live
- Website: espn975.com

KFNC (97.5 FM, "ESPN Houston") is a commercial radio station licensed to Mont Belvieu, Texas, United States. KFNC is paired with an FM translator, K223CW, licensed to Houston. The facilities serve the Greater Houston and Golden Triangle areas of southeast Texas. The station is owned by David Gow, through licensee Gow Media, LLC, with studios in Uptown Houston one block from The Galleria. KFNC is an affiliate of ESPN Radio, carried late nights and weekends. Local sports shows are heard weekdays from 7 a.m. to midnight and on weekend mornings.

KFNC's transmitter is sited off of Route 124 in Anahuac, Texas. A 2,000 watt booster, KFNC-FM-1, had its transmitter off West Baker Road in Baytown, but has since been powered down, its license returned, and subsequently deleted.

== History ==
=== From 99.5 KRIC through "KD 97" ===
On March 1, 1948, the station began broadcasting on 99.5 MHz as KRIC and continued on that frequency through the early 1950s.

Interference to Beaumont viewers trying to watch KGUL-TV in Galveston (now KHOU-TV in Houston), since its March 22, 1953 sign-on, caused the FCC to swap frequencies with this facility and one allocated to Lake Charles, Louisiana. That changed KRIC's operating frequency to 97.5 FM in order to alleviate the interference to KGUL-TV's signal. The Lake Charles 99.5 station continues to operate as well, and is currently country KNGT, having first signed on in November 1965 as KPLC.

The KRIC call sign was changed to KAYD several years later to match its then AM counterpart 1450 KAYC. As KAYD, 97.5 was the long-time FM country music outlet in the Golden Triangle, going by the branding "KD 97".

In December 2001, a new 2,000-foot tower was built near Winnie, Texas so that the station could target the more lucrative Houston radio market.

It was as at this point that the country format of "KD 97" was moved to KAYD-FM 101.7 as "KD101." Meanwhile, 97.5 began stunting, initially with Christmas music, and afterward, a week-long loop of airing empowerment-themed music and speeches from African-American artists and figures.

=== As KRWP ===
On January 3, 2002, the station officially began targeting the Houston market by flipping to an Urban Contemporary format as Power 97.5 under the temporary call letters KKTT but gave KRPW as its on-air identification. (The station was unable to get the call sign in time for the sign on and acquired the KRWP call letters several weeks later.) KRWP also continued to serve the Beaumont area, while primarily targeting Houston.

The station, renamed KRWP (PoWeR spelled backwards) had modest success in the early months of 2002. However, it faced stiff competition from longtime Houston hip-hop music stations 97.9 KBXX and 104.9 KPTY-FM as well as Rhythmic Contemporary station KTHT."97.5 KRWP/Beaumont, TX".

KRWP later skewed to an Urban Adult Contemporary format with the intent of challenging the market's heritage R&B station, 102.1 KMJQ. However, KRWP never came close to KMJQ in the ratings due to the location of the transmitter, which resulted in a lack of decent coverage for the market. KRWP was transmitting from a site 50 miles east of Houston in Chambers County. KRWP was home to the syndicated Doug Banks in the Mornings, even through the format altering in 2003."POWER 97.5".

=== Switch to Rock 97.5 ===
In late 2004, there were plans for KRWP to switch frequencies to 103.7 FM, or otherwise launch a simulcast with another station with the objective of providing better coverage in Houston. At the same time, Houston's heritage album-oriented rock (AOR) station, 101.1 KLOL, dumped its rock format after 34 years, flipping to a Hurban (Hispanic Urban) format.

On January 27, 2005, under new management, KRWP switched to an AOR format, switching its call sign to KIOL as "Rock 97.5." The format change was headed by former KLOL personality Jim Pruett and program director Pat Fant, in response to the outcry from misplaced KLOL listeners. The first song played on "Rock 97.5" was "For Those About to Rock (We Salute You)" by AC/DC.

=== KIOL moves to 103.7; FM Newschannel debuts ===
103.7 signed back on the air May 23, 2005, after being purchased by Cumulus Media, and subsequently moved its transmitting site from Willis to Devers, including a major facility upgrade to full Class C status. Cumulus began simulcasting "Rock 97.5" KIOL on the new 103.7 KUST signal for testing purposes and to familiarize listeners with the new frequency. The simulcast lasted for the next 8 days.

On May 31, 2005, at 6 a.m., 97.5 KIOL broke the simulcast and launched Houston's third attempt at an FM news/talk station, as KFNC "FM News Channel 97-5." (102.1 KLYX—now KMJQ—was the first in 1975 as an affiliate of NBC Radio's now-defunct 24-hour NBC News and Information Service; 97.1 KKTL was the second FM News/Talk station, and is now classic country.) Adopting a News/Talk radio format, the station consisted of former KLOL morning personalities Jim Pruett and Brian Shannon (the voice of Eddie "The Boner" Sanchez), who reunited to host the afternoon talk show "Back Talk", which was later moved to mornings. Other KLOL alumni on board for the station's news department were Laurie Kendrick and Martha Martinez. Non-KLOL personalities included former KILT newsman Jim Carolla, former KRBE and "NewsRadio 740" staffer Michael Shiloh as morning host/anchor, former "Newsradio 740" reporter and editor Belinda Babinec, former KPRC-TV sports director Craig Roberts, A.W. Pantoja, Clark Howard, Phil Hendrie, and Charles McPhee. Despite the station's call letters suggesting an affiliation with Fox News Channel, the station has never been an affiliate of the network's related Fox News Radio service (KPRC (AM) serves as the network's Houston affiliate; that service by coincidence launched a day after KFNC's launch).

=== Sports format ===
KFNC went through format tweaks and house cleaning, and the "FM News Channel" moniker was dropped around spring of 2006. The station became "Supertalk 97.5." However, the station's ratings failed to keep the talk format afloat. KFNC switched to its current sports radio format, officially launching in mid-January 2007. KFNC's on-air branding, ESPN 97.5 The Ticket, was similar to that of a co-owned AM sports station in Dallas, KTCK. KFNC affiliated with ESPN Radio, which previously heard on Clear Channel's KBME 790 AM. KBME affiliated with Fox Sports Radio.

In 2007, Cumulus Media moved KFNC to its new Houston headquarters, along with sister station 103.7 KIOL in the Chase Building at 9801 Westheimer Road in Houston. That facility already housed 104.1 KRBE since the mid-1980s.

As part of a prepackaged bankruptcy filing, the lenders took over the license of four Cumulus Media Partners stations; two in the Kansas City metro area (KCHZ and KMJK) and the two rimshot signals in the Houston metro, KHJK and KFNC, in November 2011. Station broker Larry Patrick emerged as the majority owner of the stations and set out to sell the stations to recover the value for the lenders. While Cumulus lost the licenses in bankruptcy, it continued to program the stations under a Local marketing agreement (LMA).

Cumulus had the opportunity to buy the stations back, but ultimately the highest bidder for KFNC was David Gow, owner of sports-formatted AM 1560 KGOW and the highest bidder for KHJK was the Educational Media Foundation, a Christian broadcaster. KFNC remained affiliated with ESPN Radio following the sale to Gow and no major programming changes occurred.

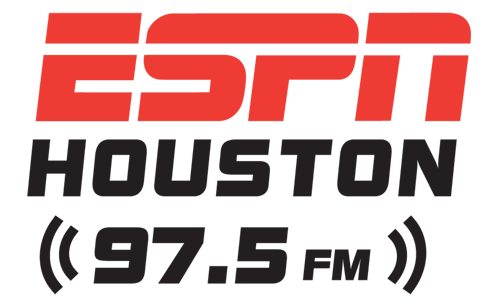
Former logo

On November 23, 2025, during the broadcast of an NFL game, the station was hijacked by an unidentified individual that played the song "Nigger Hatin' Me" by 1960s-era white supremacist country singer Johnny Rebel, Emergency Alert System tones, and liners promoting the hacker's supposed social media accounts.

== KFNC HD-2/K231CN; "Sports Map 94.1" ==
On October 1, 2017, relay translator K231CN Houston, Texas, allegedly moved from KODA's HD-3 subchannel to the new KFNC HD-2, though there has never been any evidence that KFNC has actually operated an HD2 signal. With the change, the former "SB Nation" format of 1560 KGOW also moved from the AM facility to 97.5 HD-2 & 94.1, and re-imaged as "SportsMap 94.1". Sports Map 94.1 is currently owned by Gow Media, LLC, a company named after and controlled by David Gow. K231CN was the flagship station of SportsMap, which is likewise owned by David Gow, and is a national sports network which competes with ESPN and Fox Sports.

KFNC HD-2/K231CN is the flagship radio station for Rice University football. In 2017, KFNC HD-2/K231CN acquired rights to the Sugar Land Skeeters minor league baseball team.

On January 31, 2019, K231CN switched from sports to Spanish Christian, branded as "Radio Luz."

== KFNC-FM1 booster ==
On June 22, 2018, Gow Media was granted an on-channel FM booster for KFNC, assigned the call letters KFNC-FM-1, powered at 2,000 watts, elevated at 171 meters height above average terrain, and located near Texas State Highway 330 and West Baker Road in Baytown, Texas.

== Translator ==
Broadcast translator for KFNC
Call sign	Frequency	City of license	FID	ERP (W)	HAAT	Class	FCC info
K233CW	92.5 FM	Houston	148239	30	304 m (997 ft)	D	LMS

== Programming ==
On weekdays, The Bench with John Granato & Lance Zierlein starts off the day from 7-10am. The Del Olaleye Show is on from 10am-12pm. Paul Gallant and Joe George host from 12-3pm. The Killer B's with Joel Blank & Jeremy Branham is on from 3-6pm. ESPN Radio is broadcast overnights and weekends.
