= KROI =

Regional Mexican radio station in Houston

- Seabrook, Texas; United States
- Broadcast area: Greater Houston
- Frequency: 92.1 MHz (HD Radio)
- Branding: La Ley 92.1

Programming
- Language: Spanish
- Format: Regional Mexican
- Subchannels: HD2: Regional Mexican "La Privada 92.1FM HD2"

Ownership
- Owner: Spanish Broadcasting System; (SBS Houston Licensing, Inc.)

History
- First air date: April 23, 1984
- Former call signs: KZRQ (1984–1985); KYND (1985–1986); KLEF (1986–1987); KRTS (1987–2004)
- Call sign meaning: "Radio One Incorporated" (former owner)

Technical information
- Licensing authority: FCC
- Facility ID: 35565
- Class: C1
- ERP: 40,000 watts
- HAAT: 421 meters (1,381 ft)
- Transmitter coordinates: 29°21′59″N 95°22′58″W

Links
- Public license information: Public file; LMS
- Webcast: Listen live
- Website: www.lamusica.com/stations/kroi

KROI (92.1 FM) is a radio station serving the Greater Houston market. It is licensed to Seabrook, Texas and owned by the Spanish Broadcasting System. The station's studios are located in Greenway Plaza and the transmitter is based near Rosharon in unincorporated Brazoria County.

The station began as a Top 40 station upon its launch in 1983, but later shifted to beautiful music in 1984, and then classical music in 1986, before its acquisition by Radio One in 2004.

Under Radio One's ownership, the station underwent numerous format changes. Following a short-lived regional Mexican format, KROI became an urban contemporary gospel station in 2006, then flipped to an all-news radio format in October 2011. Plagued by poor ratings and large financial losses, the station changed formats again in October 2014 to Boom 92—a format focusing on classic hip-hop music. That format also proved to be unsuccessful in the long run, resulting in another format change back to top 40 in January 2017, followed by a reversion to gospel in May 2021. In December 2024, the Spanish Broadcasting System acquired the station for $7.5 million, upon which the station reverted to a regional Mexican format.

== History ==
=== Early years ===
The very first radio station in the Houston area on the 92.1 frequency was KREL-FM, sister station of KREL AM 1360 in Baytown. KREL-FM signed on in April 1949, and simulcast its sister station for its entire existence. With FM radio failing to grow in popularity in the early 50s, KREL-FM was taken off the air in November 1953. The 92.1 frequency would remain unoccupied for the next thirty years.

The current 92.1 FM frequency signed on the air April 23, 1984 with a satellite-delivered adult contemporary format from Transtar. Within weeks, former KRBE programmer Clay Gish was hired as Program Director, and on June 1 he changed the station to a live contemporary hit radio format as KZRQ "Z92". The station, which was only a 1,400-watt at 300-foot Class A, took heavy shots against its CHR neighbor on the dial, KKBQ-FM "93FM" (which is a 100,000-watt Class C at 2,000 feet) and even had a song parody of then hit, Ray Parker Jr's "Ghostbusters" called "Zoobusters" that poked fun of KKBQ-FM's Q-Zoo morning show. The station also claimed to be the first station to play CDs and the world's first all-digital station.

Z92, with its limited signal, was unable to make a dent against KKBQ, and barely showed up in the ratings, with a 0.3 share compared to KKBQ's 9.2 in the Fall 1984 Arbitron survey. On February 25, 1985, KZRQ flipped to a beautiful music format with the KYND callsign (ironically, KKBQ-FM's previous incarnation). On April 2, 1986, KYND flipped to classical music, first as KLEF, and then later KRTS. The change occurred to fill the void when KLEF (94.5 FM) flipped from classical to adult contemporary as KJYY. Due to the station's transmitter being located further away from Houston, the station simulcasted on KRTK for a time. KRTS finally got upgrades in the 1980s, to a C2 (500 feet and 50,000 watts) at the intersection of US 59 and Texas 288 and then finally as a Class C1 (100,000 watts at 1,000 feet) in the 1990s. It currently is a C1 license (though at lower ERP) on the 2,000-foot Liverpool tower, close to KGLK's tower.

Radio One purchased KRTS in September 2004, changed its calls to KROI, and flipped the station, first to a two-week long hot adult contemporary format as simply "92.1 KROI" on September 15, and then to regional Mexican as "La Mera Mera" on September 29. When that was unsuccessful, its owners, which mainly specialize in urban contemporary radio formatted station ownership (with a majority African-American listener base), flipped it one more time to an urban contemporary gospel format branded as "Praise 92.1" at 6:45 pm on July 17, 2006. The first song on "Praise" was Why We Sing by Kirk Franklin & The Family. KROI was the flagship of the nationally syndicated Yolanda Adams Morning Show, which debuted March 2007. Outside of that, it was mainly jockless throughout the day except for several specialized programs on the weekends.

=== News 92: filling a void in Houston radio ===
On October 28, 2011, Radio One announced that KROI would flip to an all-news format, starting November 17. This is the first time Radio One has programmed an all-news station geared towards a mainstream audience. Houston, the 6th largest radio market in the United States, according to Arbitron, has been underserved in regards to radio news, as KTRH and KPRC, well known for news coverage in past decades, have become predominantly talk radio oriented in recent years. The Praise 92 gospel format, as well as the station's status as the flagship of the Yolanda Adams Morning Show, moved over to the HD2 subchannel of KMJQ and to its online website.

On November 18, at 9 a.m., following the Yolanda Adams Morning Show (and after playing "Clean Inside" by Hezekiah Walker), KROI began stunting with construction sounds in preparation of its switch to all-news, with slogans such as "100% News, 0% Spin", "Reporting Houston 24/7", "Just give us 20 minutes each day for the next 20 days". There were also liners promoting that News 92 would launch soon during the stunt. The new format officially launched at 5 am on November 21. On-air talent included former radio and TV personalities from KTRH, KSEV, KPRC-TV, KLOL, KRBE, KIAH and KRIV, most already fairly well-known to the Houston audience (additionally, afternoon traffic reporter Robert Washington, who served in a similar role some years back for KTRH, was a DJ under the gospel music format). The new format operated as an affiliate of ABC News Radio (which was picked up by KTRH in 2016) and featured ABC News reports at the top and bottom of each hour. It also aired syndicated programs, such as The Jim Bohannon Show on weeknights and The John Batchelor Show on weekend evenings; weather and traffic updates were delivered "on the 9s". On Sundays, simulcasts of ABC's This Week with George Stephanopoulos and NBC's Meet the Press were featured.

During the three years of the news format, the station had low ratings; in September 2014, KROI was ranked 26th in the Houston market Nielsen Audio ratings, with a 0.9 overall audience share.

=== Boom 92 ===
On October 8, 2014, at 9 a.m., KROI ended its all-news format and laid off 47 employees; Radio One management cited poor ratings performance and "significant financial losses over the past three years despite the substantial financial and human resources invested" as reasoning for the decision. Following the sign-off of News 92, the station returned to a music-based format, stunting as "B92" by exclusively playing music by Houston native Beyoncé.

On October 13, at 5 p.m., KROI flipped to a classic hip hop format branded as Boom 92; the launch symbolically featured "Mind Playing Tricks on Me", a song by the Houston-based Geto Boys, as its first song. The format focused primarily on hip-hop acts from the 1980s and the 1990s, and was aimed towards listeners between the ages of 25 and 44, complementing its sister stations KMJQ and KBXX. Doug Abernethy, general manager of Radio One's Houston stations, described the format as a parallel to the classic rock and classic country formats, while Radio One considered the station to be the first major market station of its kind in the United States.

KROI became the first of many stations to adopt the format in the following months. KROI's ratings also saw a significant improvement over that of its news format, becoming the 14th highest-rated radio station in Houston with an audience share of 3.2 as of November 2014, however, by the following Spring, it would once again suffer low ratings, holding an audience share of 1.8 as of April 2015, and eventually only 1.0 as of June 2016. While the station did improve to a 1.4 by the December books, it was too little, too late for "Boom".

=== 92.1 Radio Now ===
On January 4, 2017, Radio One registered several domain names associated with "Now" for the station, which led to speculation that KROI would undergo a format change for the third time in three years. Registration of the website "radionowhouston.com" occurred the previous day on January 3, and coincided directly with the same registrar as "boom92houston.com", further fueling the rumors of an imminent format change.

On January 5, at 5 pm, after playing "Da Rockwilder" by Method Man & Redman, KROI flipped back to Top 40/CHR as "92.1 Radio Now", capitalizing on the recent dropping of the format by KKHH the week prior, and hoping to pick up listeners spurned by said format change. The first song on "Radio Now" was "This Is What You Came For" by Calvin Harris and Rihanna. With the change, KROI once again became one of only two stations owned by Radio One to not carry an urban-oriented format (the other being similarly-formatted WNOW-FM in Indianapolis) and the second to sport the "Radio Now" moniker. The change also brought the conclusion to the third ever classic hip-hop station in the U.S. (the first two to air the format were then-Phoenix station KNRJ and Los Angeles station KDAY, who continues with the format), and returned the station to the original format it launched with in 1983.

On November 12, 2018, the station added "The Joe & Alex Show" from sister WNOW-FM, as its new morning show. In March 2020, the show was replaced by The Kidd Kraddick Morning Show.

=== Praise 92.1 ===
Previous logo

On May 17, 2021, KROI flipped back to urban gospel under the former "Praise 92.1" branding.

=== Sale to Spanish Broadcasting System ===
In April 2023, it was announced that Urban One would acquire the Houston radio cluster of Cox Media Group. This, at the time of the sale, would have resulted in Urban One being over FCC ownership limits, forcing the divestitures of two stations in the combined cluster; the stations to be sold were later determined by the two companies to be KROI and Cox's KTHT, which would be placed into the temporary Sugarland Station Trust divestiture trust, overseen by Scott Knoblauch. It was reported that Urban One was already in the process of negotiations for KROI with a "minority-owned" broadcaster marking their entry into the market; on April 20, it was announced said broadcaster was Spanish Broadcasting System, who would ultimately buy the station for $7.5 million. Urban One's acquisition of Cox's cluster closed in August 2023, at which time KROI and KTHT were placed into the divestiture trust. At the time the sale was announced, SBS was in the process of divesting its television business to VOZ and planned to use the money from that sale to fund its acquisition of KROI. When the deal with VOZ fell through, SBS entered into an agreement with Urban One and the divestiture trust to pay the purchase price for KROI in gradual installments through 2024.

=== La Ley 92.1 ===
On December 20, 2024, the sale to Spanish Broadcasting System was finalized; at 12 p.m. that day, the new owners took over operations of the station and began stunting with a mix of regional Mexican music. The station later relaunched as "La Ley 92.1", beginning by playing 50,000 songs in a row commercial-free. Urban One retained the "Praise" format on KMJQ's HD2 subchannel, just as it had when KROI first dropped the Praise format in 2011. The Programming is as follows; 6AM-10AM: El Show De Raul Brindis, 10AM-3PM: Tocando la que mandan en Houston, 3PM-7PM: Cheque González, y 7PM-12AM: Mas Música Por Las Noches.
