= Senior Road Tower =

Guyed mast for FM and TV broadcasting near Missouri City, Texas, United States

Coordinates: 29°34′34″N 95°30′38″W

The Senior Road Tower is a guyed mast for FM and TV broadcasting, measuring 1,971 feet (601 m) tall, located in unincorporated northeastern Fort Bend County near Missouri City, Texas, United States.

The present mast was built in 1983. It replaced a previous tower that collapsed in a construction accident in December 1982, killing five workers. While historically also used for television, its primary purpose was and is to transmit FM radio stations.

== First tower ==
While a number of Houston FM radio stations broadcast from One Shell Plaza and other sites in downtown Houston, the late 1970s saw the construction of several new, taller buildings in the downtown area that created issues for regional coverage, particularly the Texas Commerce Tower and Allied Bank Plaza. In 1980, ten Houston radio stations, later reduced to nine—KFMK, KIKK, KILT, KLEF, KLOL, KODA, KRBE, KSRR, and KYND—began to scout out a site for a new facility in an area that was becoming a cluster of transmission towers. Television stations KTRK-TV and KRIV were also building tall towers near this site. The original plan was to build the mast on Senior Road, and the consortium of stations became known as the Senior Road Tower Group. However, plans changed, and the eventual site was not on Senior Road. The radio stations were joined in the venture by KTXH, a new Houston television station.

Tower work began in 1982 but came to a brief halt due to a dispute over mineral rights to the tower site. In an apparent oversight, the title company failed to notice that Lew D. French Jr. had leased the mineral rights, planning to drill for oil on the property. He drove by and asked what was going on, starting a legal action that led to a temporary stay on construction. Construction resumed after an out-of-court settlement. Tower erection began in October, with the antenna for KTXH television being raised first. That station began broadcasting on November 7. It was anticipated that the FM stations would begin using the mast on February 1, 1983.

=== Construction accident ===
Nearly a month after KTXH began broadcasting, work reached a fever pitch on the FM transmission facility. On December 6, workers hoisted the first half of the antenna structure onto the tower, and it was anticipated that the final 75-foot (23 m) structure would be hoisted onto the tower the next day, December 7. A KIKK employee was videotaping the event. While the item was being hoisted into place, the antenna fell from the cable pulling it up. It fell on one of the guy wires, which caused the tower to collapse. Five men strapped to the antenna died; the five employees, all out-of-state workers from World Wide Tower Service of New Jersey, were Gene Crosby, David Stewart, Don Owens, Johnny Wilson, and Johnny Bratten. Bodies were dismembered by the failing guy wires. World Wide Tower was subcontracted by Stainless Inc., the firm that manufactured the tower. Three men, employed by a Houston roofing firm working on the roof of the transmitter building, were injured. KTXH suffered a $1.5 million loss in equipment, including the transmitter, on which the falling mast collapsed. A man in the transmitter building saw the tower collapse and fled.

In the wake of the accident, the Senior Road Tower Group assigned blame to a clamping device that fastened the antenna to the cable. The construction company had to jury-rig a lifting device of their own design, as the antenna lifting points were not designed for the final lift. The cable from the gin pole would intersect the dish of the antenna and damage it. The design analysis of the construction company was flawed, leading them to underestimate the load on the bolts by a factor of seven. In addition, the U-bolts they used were defective; the manufacturer rated them for twice the load they were good for. One of the U-bolts failed, causing the antenna to fall and snap two of the guy wires holding the tower upright.

For KTXH, the loss of the Senior Road Tower left the station off the air for two months; the station immediately ordered a new transmitter. The station filed a $42 million lawsuit, alleging negligent construction and claiming a $7 million loss in equipment and advertising for the 61 days it was out of service. Even while broadcasting from a temporary facility atop the Allied Bank Plaza, KTXH continued to post competitive numbers against KRIV.

In addition to the lawsuit filed by KTXH, the family of one of the victims sued for $2 million, as did several of the injured. As a result of the then-pending litigation, investigations by the federal Occupational Safety and Health Administration and by insurers were not publicly released. After a 10-day trial, in February 1985, a federal jury awarded nearly $19 million to the families of the victims, with Stainless to pay 100 percent of the damages; this came after a settlement agreement for $21 million was partially withdrawn. The $19 million award was reduced to $14 million by a federal judge who ruled the jury had improperly awarded punitive damages and replaced by a $6.4 million award in a new settlement. Combined with $11 million in payments from Harris and World Wide Tower, the total received by the families was $17.4 million.

== Second tower ==
The Senior Road Tower Group met a week later and opted to continue the project. Jay Jones, the vice president of KLOL, told Billboard, "We've been delayed significantly, but FM stations in Houston have a real problem with their signal, and we've got to do something about it." The foundation and guy anchors remained in usable condition, and the $4 million loss was insured.

After further delays caused by rain and Hurricane Alicia, work was completed in October 1983 on the new mast, which was identical to the one that collapsed. Of the nine FM stations, all still at the site, six migrated from One Shell Plaza and three from other facilities. KTXH began migrating off the mast when it built its digital transmission facility at a new, purpose-built tower in 1999.

== Tower users ==
The Senior Road Tower is used by the following radio stations:

- KKBQ (92.9 FM)
- KTBZ-FM 94.5
- KKHH (95.7 FM)
- KHMX (96.5 FM)
- KBXX (97.9 FM)
- KODA (99.1 FM)
- KILT-FM 100.3
- KLOL (101.1 FM)
- KRBE (104.1 FM)

The tower has wrap-around outside platforms at 900, 1,100, and 1,400 feet on the tower. The platforms support antennas and equipment cabinets used by various two way radio systems and remote pickup unit (RPU) receivers for radio broadcasters.

Heights:

- Elevation of Site Above Mean Sea Level: 24.1 m (79 ft)
- Overall Height Above Ground (AGL): 600.7 m (1,971 ft)
- Overall Height Above Mean Sea Level: 624.5 m (2,049 ft)
- Overall Height Above Ground w/o Appurtenances: 569.8 m (1,869 ft)

== See also ==
- List of masts
