= One Shell Plaza =

Skyscraper in Houston, Texas

910 Louisiana
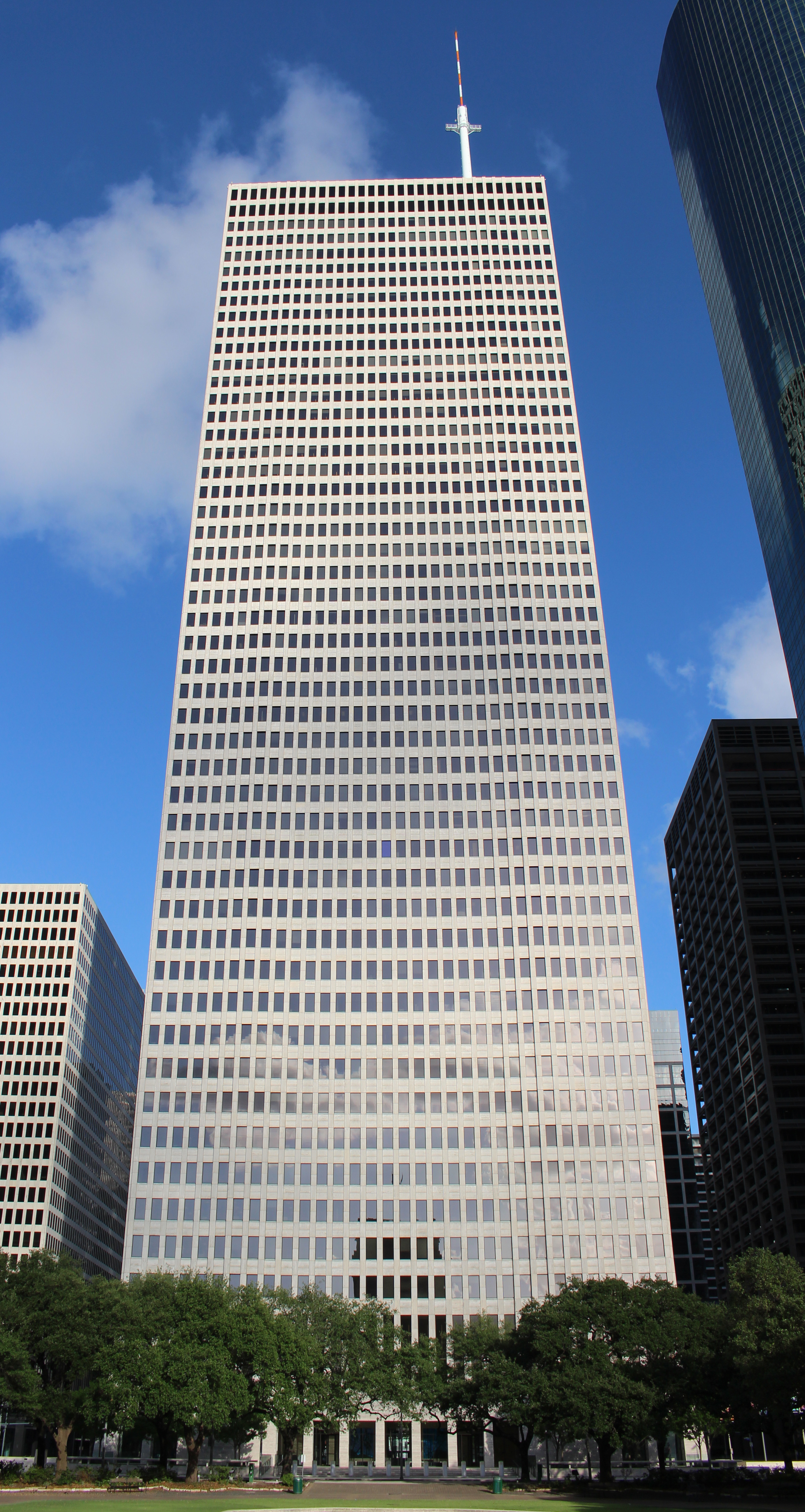
- Interactive map of the 910 Louisiana area

General information
- Status: Completed
- Type: Commercial offices
- Architectural style: Modernism
- Location: 910 Louisiana Street; Houston, Texas, United States
- Coordinates: 29.7591°N 95.3677°W
- Completed: 1971; 55 years ago

Height
- Antenna spire: 304.8 m (1,000 ft)
- Roof: 218 m (715 ft)

Technical details
- Floor count: 50
- Floor area: 113,900 m^{2} (1,226,000 sq ft)
- Lifts/elevators: 22

Design and construction
- Architect: Skidmore, Owings & Merrill
- Developer: Hines Interests Limited Partnership
- Engineer: Skidmore, Owings & Merrill
- Main contractor: W. S. Bellows Construction

910 Louisiana formerly One Shell Plaza (OSP) is a 50-story, 218 m (715 ft) skyscraper at 910 Louisiana Street in Downtown Houston, Texas. Perched atop the building is an antenna that brings the pinnacle height of the building to 304.8 m (1,000 ft). At its completion in 1971, the tower was the tallest in the city.

== Designers ==
910 Louisiana was designed by the architectural firm of Skidmore, Owings & Merrill. Associate architects were Wilson, Morris, Crain & Anderson, and the landscape architects were Sasaki Associates.

The Hancock Whitney Center in New Orleans and Republic Plaza in Denver, also designed by Skidmore, Owings & Merrill, have designs very similar to that of 910 Louisiana. Like 910 Louisiana, the Hancock Whitney Center also has Shell Oil as a major tenant, and was previously named One Shell Square.

== History ==
At its completion in 1971, the tower was the tallest in the city. The building was renovated in 1994. The $80 million in major renovations included an updated lobby and plaza, elevator modernization, upgrades to the buildings EMP systems, new lighting, and ADA modifications.

In December 2011, Shell renewed the lease for 804,491 ft^{2} (74,739.7 m^{2}). The 15-year lease started retroactively on January 1, 2011, ending in 2025.

In June 2012 910 Louisiana, together with 26-story Two Shell Plaza at 811 Louisiana Street, were purchased by Enterprise Products Partners, which is owned by the family of Dan Duncan, Houston's wealthiest man. The two buildings sold for a reported $550 million.

== Tenants ==
Shell Oil Company, a subsidiary of Shell plc, was headquartered in this building until 2016.

Baker Botts, one of the largest law firms in Houston, has been a tenant in the building since it opened in 1971. Baker Botts renewed its eight-floor, 172,301-square-foot lease in 2022, making it a tenant for over 50 years.

As of 2018, NRG Energy occupied the bottom 22 floors of the building.

The Houston Club, on the 49th floor of the building, has dining, entertainment, and meeting facilities.

== Antennas ==
The 170 ft mast atop the building has carried various television and radio signals since the building's completion. The mast supported 1971 start up channel 26 KVRL (later KDOG, now KRIV) and a mast that simultaneously radiated signals for eight FM stations KYND (then 92.5, now KKBQ on 92.9 MHz), 93.7 KRLY (now KQBT), 95.7 KIKK-FM (now KKHH), 99.1 KODA, 100.3 KILT-FM, 101.1 KLOL, 102.1 KLYX (now KMJQ), and 104.1 KRBE. The combiner and antenna was supplied by Electronic Research Inc. One Shell was used until the completion of the then Texas Commerce Tower and Allied Bank Plaza in 1982–1983, creating a skyscraper canyon that causes multipath distortion, and necessitated the move to the Houston antenna farm in Missouri City.

== Gallery ==
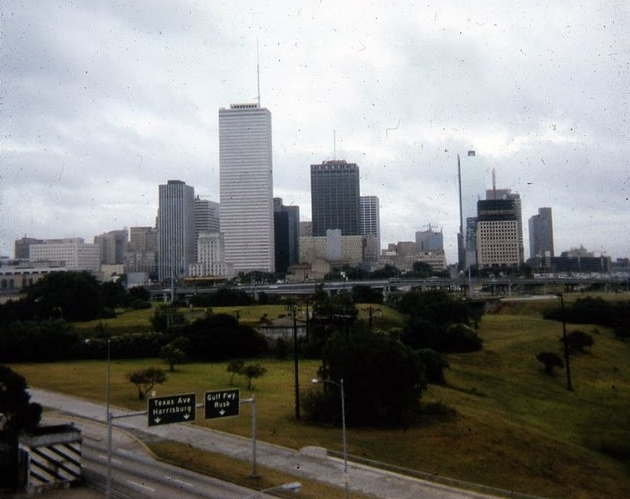
Houston skyline in 1971 shortly after completion of the building

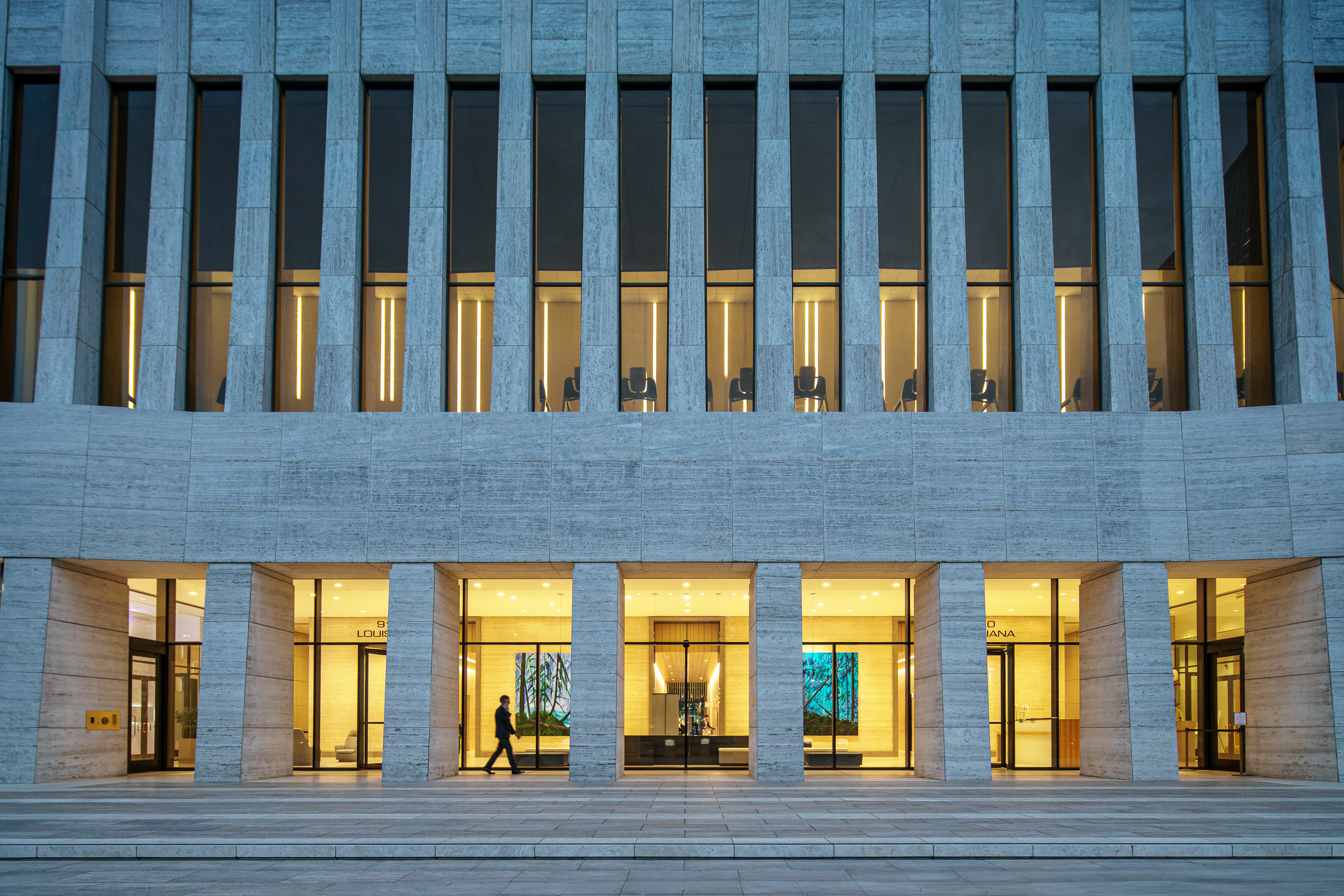
Entrance on Smith Street

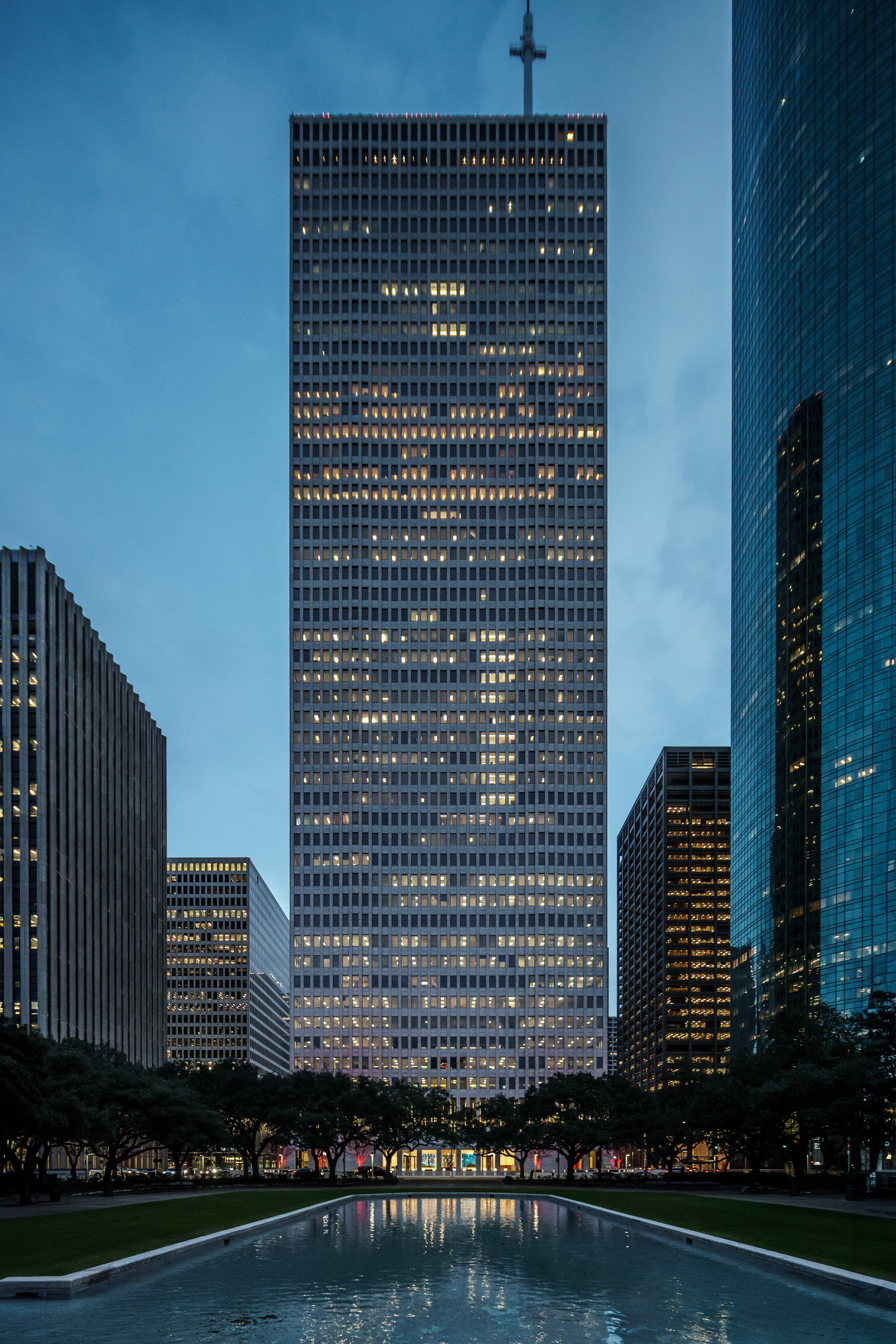
Dusk

== In popular culture ==
One Shell Plaza on television

The fictional "World Building", the setting of the oil company "World Oil"

Same scene introduction, looking up at the building

Screen captures of the former NBC soap opera Another World from August 1980. Exteriors were often seen during its spinoff show Texas.

The building was used as the fictional "World Building", the setting of fictional oil company "World Oil", a fictional Houston-based firm, as part of initial storylines presented on the former NBC soap opera Another World. It featured even more prominently on spinoff series Texas, set in Houston.

== See also ==
- List of tallest buildings in Texas
- List of tallest buildings in Houston
- List of tallest buildings in the United States
