= KTDD =

KTDD may refer to:

- KTDD (FM), a radio station (104.9 FM) licensed to serve Eatonville, Washington, United States
- KPWK (AM), a radio station (1350 AM) licensed to serve San Bernardino, California, United States, which held the call sign KTDD from 2002 to 2017
- KHJK, a radio station (103.7 FM) licensed to serve La Porte, Texas, United States, which held the call sign KTDD from 1990 to 1991
