= KXXF =

KXXF may refer to:

- KXXF (FM), a radio station (106.5 FM) licensed to serve Springer, New Mexico, United States; see List of radio stations in New Mexico
- KLTW (FM), a radio station (105.3 FM) licensed to serve Winnie, Texas, United States, which held the call sign KXXF from 2014 to 2023
