= KZRT =

- Ridgecrest, California; United States
- Frequency: 93.7 MHz
- Branding: 93ZRT

Programming
- Format: Classic hits
- Affiliations: Compass Media Networks, United Stations Radio Networks

Ownership
- Owner: David Baes

History
- First air date: July 2012
- Former call signs: KKYT (2012–2013); KZFX (2013–2026)

Technical information
- Licensing authority: FCC
- Facility ID: 190406
- Class: A
- ERP: 1,700 watts
- HAAT: −68 meters (−223 ft)
- Transmitter coordinates: 35°37′20″N 117°40′13″W
- Translator: 107.1 K296DW (Lone Pine)

Links
- Public license information: Public file; LMS
- Website: www.93zrt.com

KZRT (93.7 FM, "93ZRT") is a commercial radio station in Ridgecrest, California, United States, broadcasting to the area along US 395 from Ridgecrest to Lone Pine. The station is owned by David Baes and broadcasts a classic hits format.

== History ==
The station was first signed on in July 2012 as KKYT and aired a country music format branded "The Coyote". This lasted until September 25, 2013, when the station flipped to classic rock. On November 16, 2013, the station changed its call sign to KZFX. The KZFX call sign had been previously used from 1986 to 1994 by Z107 in Houston, Texas.

In December 2025, the station went silent, citing transmitter amplifier pallet failure. It was purchased the next month by David Baes for $20,000. Baes simultaneously bought the facility's associated translator. The call sign was changed to KZRT on January 23, 2026. Under Baes, the station broadcasts a mix of songs from the 1980s to 2000s.
