= KLVH (FM) =

K-Love radio station in Houston

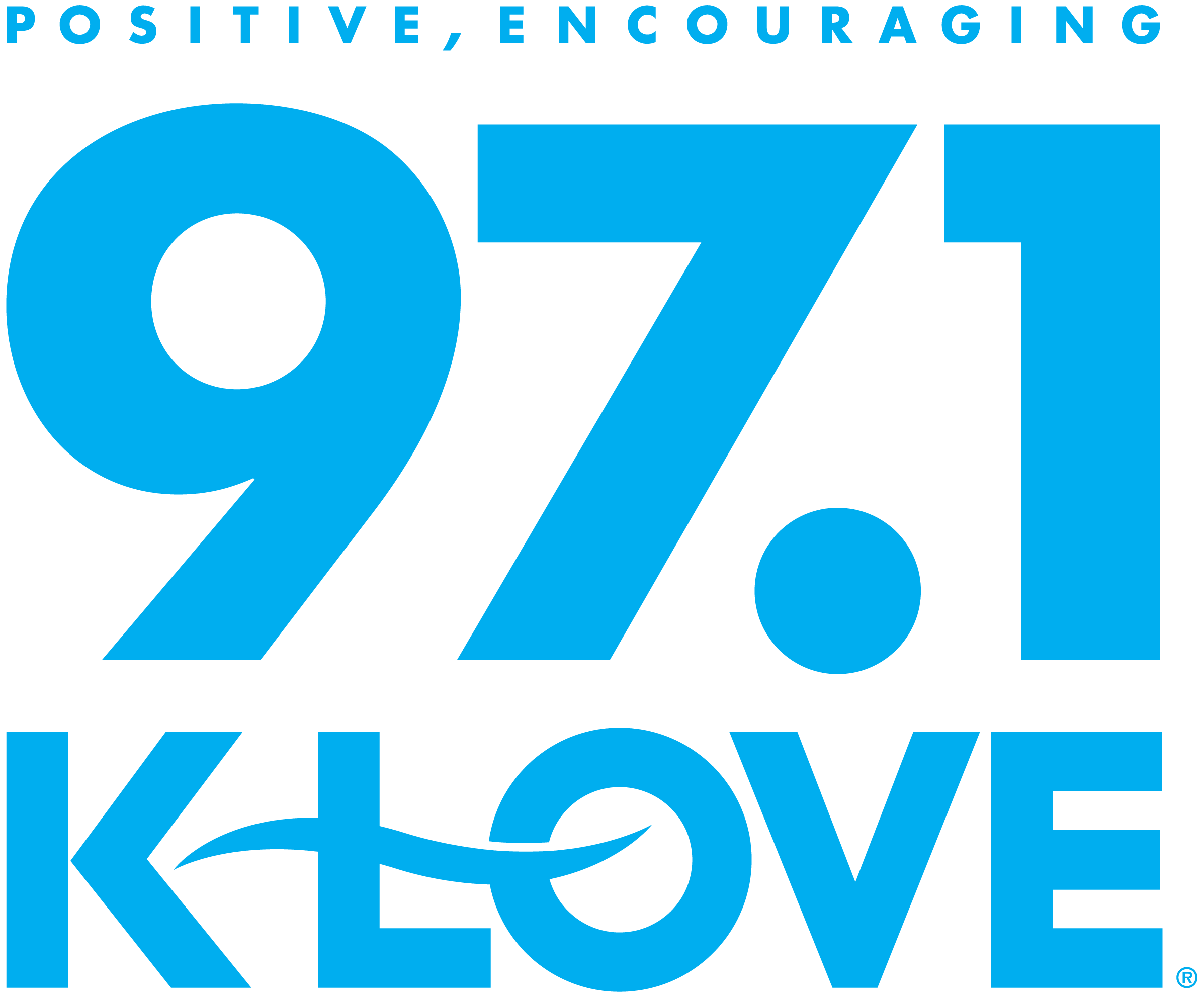
- Cleveland, Texas; United States
- Broadcast area: Greater Houston; Deep East Texas
- Frequency: 97.1 MHz (HD Radio)
- Branding: K-Love

Programming
- Language: English
- Format: Christian adult contemporary
- Subchannels: HD2: K-Love Eras; HD3: K-Love Pop!
- Affiliations: K-Love

Ownership
- Owner: Educational Media Foundation
- Sister stations: KHJK, KLTW

History
- First air date: January 7, 1993; 33 years ago
- Former call signs: KRTK (1991–1995); KEYH-FM (1995–1996); KOND (1996–1997); KRTK (1997); KKTL (1997–1999); KKTL-FM (1999–2000); KTHT (2000–2023)
- Call sign meaning: K-Love Houston

Technical information
- Licensing authority: FCC
- Facility ID: 65308
- Class: C
- ERP: 100,000 watts
- HAAT: 563 meters (1,847 ft)
- Transmitter coordinates: 30°32′6″N 95°1′4″W

Links
- Public license information: Public file; LMS
- Webcast: Listen live
- Website: www.klove.com

KLVH (97.1 FM "K-Love") is a non-commercial radio station licensed to Cleveland, Texas, and serving the northern section of Greater Houston. The station airs the programming of the K-Love national radio network, which broadcasts a Christian adult contemporary radio format, and is owned by the Educational Media Foundation.

KLVH has an effective radiated power (ERP) of 100,000 watts. The transmitter site is off Route 222 at Bob McGowan Road in Shepherd, Texas, near Sam Houston National Forest. That puts it about halfway between Houston and Lufkin, Texas.

== Station history ==
=== Classical KRTK ===
On January 17, 1993, the station signed on as KRTK, and was owned by Texas Classical Radio, Inc. KRTK originally simulcast the classical music programming on KRTS in Seabrook, to increase that station's coverage in northern sections of the Houston radio market. It was sold four years later after KRTS' request to increase power was approved by the Federal Communications Commission (FCC).

=== Regional Mexican KEYH-FM ===
In September 1995, 97.1 began simulcasting Regional Mexican-formatted KEYH as KEYH-FM. The simulcast ended a short time later, as KEYH-FM began to air its own Regional Mexican format as "Estereo 97", which later became "Que Onda 97" in March 1996.

In January 1997, the station was bought by AMFM, Inc. for $10 million.

=== Talk, alternative and oldies ===
The call sign switched to KKTL and flipped to news/talk as "Houston's Talk FM, 97 Talk", in September 1997. The following year, Jacor bought KKTL for $14.7 million.

In March 1999, after the talk format floundered, the station switched to a simulcast of alternative rock-formatted KTBZ-FM "107-5 The Buzz". KKTL continued simulcasting 107.5 after KTBZ and KLDE ("Oldies 94.5") swapped frequencies in July 2000, making 97.1 an oldies outlet. The swap was the result of an ownership trade-off in the AMFM/Jacor/Clear Channel merger.

=== Hot 97.1 ===
In August 2000, Cox acquired KKTL. On November 4, 2000, the station split from the KLDE simulcast and began stunting with a robotic text-to-speech countdown to Noon, using the same Microsoft Mary voice that KKHT used a month prior. At that time, KKTL flipped to rhythmic contemporary as KTHT, "Hot 97.1". The first song on "Hot" was "Party Up" by DMX. after playing "Back That Thang Up" by Juvenile,

=== Country Legends ===
On January 2, 2003, at Noon, KTHT flipped to a classic country format as "Country Legends 97.1". The first song on "Country Legends" was "You Never Even Called Me by My Name" by David Allan Coe.

Core artists included Garth Brooks, Reba McEntire, Willie Nelson, Dolly Parton and Ronnie Milsap.

=== K-Love ===
In April 2023, it was announced that Urban One would acquire the Houston radio cluster of Cox Media Group. This, at the time of the sale, would have resulted in Urban One being over FCC ownership limits, forcing the divestitures of two stations in the combined cluster; the stations to be sold were later determined by the two companies to be KROI and Cox's KTHT, which would be placed into the temporary Sugarland Station Trust divestiture trust, overseen by Scott Knoblauch.

On July 26, 2023, it was announced that Educational Media Foundation, a Christian broadcaster that owns the K-Love and Air1 radio networks, would purchase KTHT for $3.1 million. The sale closed on October 31, 2023, making the station a sister to Air1-affiliated KHJK. The station changed its call sign to KLVH and, that evening at 6:00 PM, the first voice of Country Legends, Tom "Tubby" Lawler (who died in 2016), signed off Country Legends (via archival recording) by introducing its final song, "Some Memories Just Won't Die" by Marty Robbins. As the song ended, the audio feed for Country Legends faded into silence, followed a few seconds later by the K-Love audio feed. The Country Legends audio feed and programming continues on former sister station KKBQ's HD-2 signal, which can also be streamed online.
