= KGLK =

- Lake Jackson, Texas; United States
- Broadcast area: Greater Houston
- Frequency: 107.5 MHz (HD Radio)
- Branding: Houston's Eagle @ 106.9 & 107.5

Programming
- Language: English
- Format: Classic rock
- Subchannels: HD2: KJOZ simulcast HD3: Bollywood "Masala Radio 98.7"

Ownership
- Owner: Urban One; (Radio One Licenses, LLC)
- Sister stations: KHPT; KKBQ; KMJQ; KBXX

History
- First air date: June 11, 1964
- Former call signs: KLJT (1964–74); KGOL (1974–86); KZFX (1986–94); KRQT (1994–95); KTBZ (1995–2000); KLDE (2000–06); KHTC (2006–09)
- Former frequencies: 107.3 MHz (1964–83)
- Call sign meaning: "The Eagle" (station branding)

Technical information
- Licensing authority: FCC
- Facility ID: 59951
- Class: C
- ERP: 98,000 watts
- HAAT: 601 meters (1,972 ft)
- Transmitter coordinates: 29°17′16″N 95°13′53″W
- Translator: HD3: 98.7 K254BZ (Houston)
- Repeater: 106.9 KHPT (Conroe)

Links
- Public license information: Public file; LMS
- Webcast: Listen live Listen live (via Audacy)
- Website: www.houstonseagle.com masalaradio.com (HD3)

KGLK (107.5 FM, "The Eagle @ 106.9 & 107.5") is a classic rock-formatted radio station licensed to Lake Jackson, Texas, and also simulcasts on KHPT in Conroe. The facility is owned by Urban One, and is part of a five station cluster that also includes KHPT, KBXX, KMJQ and KKBQ, in the surveyed Houston metropolitan area. "The Eagle" is headquartered in Suite 2300 at 1990 Post Oak Blvd in the Uptown district of Houston. KGLK's main transmitter facilities are located near Liverpool, Texas, with a backup transmitter site co-located at the KKBQ backup site.

Between KGLK and KHPT, "The Eagle" covers more square miles than any station in southeast Texas.

== History ==
The station signed on as KLJT on June 11, 1964. The owners of KBRZ 1460 in Freeport had part interest in KLJT. Its original power was 28,000 watts with an antenna at 180 feet, essentially giving the station coverage of southern Brazoria County. The station aired a full service format with easy listening music during the day and top 40 music at night, along with local newscasts and high school sports. In June 1973, the nighttime programming was shifted to Classic Country music.

KBRZ and KLJT were sold in 1974, with the latter changing call letters to KGOL on March 18 of that year and adopting a full-time MOR format. KGOL was sold in 1979, and the new owners moved studios to Houston, upgraded the signal to 100,000 watts to start competing in the Houston market, and in June 1980 launched a contemporary Christian format. KGOL moved from 107.3 to 107.5 in 1983.

=== Classic rock: 1986-1994 ===
On August 5, 1986, the station debuted a classic rock format as KZFX "Z107". Z107 competed primarily with KSRR and KLOL. The station jumped from a 0.8 share in the Summer 1986 survey to a 4.1 in the Fall with the Classic Rock format.

=== Alternative rock: 1994-2000 ===
On October 31, 1994, at 11 a.m., the station flipped to alternative rock as KRQT, "Rocket 107.5". Under direction of new general manager Pat Fant (formerly of KLOL), the station re-launched the format in late May 1995 under the new callsign KTBZ and "107.5 The Buzz" moniker.

Due to the 2000 merger of Clear Channel Communications and AMFM, Inc., and the need to stay within the FCC's station ownership cap, Cox Radio acquired the intellectual property of "Oldies 94.5 KLDE", as well as 107.5 FM and simulcast partner 97.1 FM, but did not include the intellectual properties of "The Buzz". Shortly after that, KTBZ announced that "The Buzz" would cease operations at 107.5 on July 18 and began a "Save the Buzz" campaign, sending Buzz listeners into a frenzy for information on the station's "impending demise".

When the actual purpose of the campaign was discovered, an online forum maintained by KTBZ was shut down in order to try to keep the word from getting out as listeners began to post their findings. Still, this did not prevent listeners from distributing banners throughout Houston and painting "Save The Buzz" on their car windows. KTBZ staged a public rally, at which a representative from parent company Clear Channel Radio came to read a statement. The statement read, in part, that in response to public comments, The Buzz would be saved and moved to 94.5 FM, a much stronger signal, resulting in a "Bigger, Better Buzz".

=== Oldies: 2000-2005 ===
Just before 8:00 p.m. on July 18, 2000, KTBZ and KLDE each played a pre-recorded lead-in to the station switch. KTBZ led a one-minute countdown as they "faded" off of the 107.5 frequency, while KLDE had their air staff riding in a transporter across the dial to 107.5 FM. At exactly 8:00 p.m., the stations simultaneously exchanged frequencies. KTBZ's montage led in with "Turn on the Juice!", while KLDE's air staff "crash-landed" on 107.5. Both stations celebrated the move with their own "Switch Parties"; The Buzz presented a free concert starring Stone Temple Pilots that was broadcast live from The Aerial Theater in downtown Houston on "94.5 The Buzz", while "Oldies 107.5" marked their transition by playing 48 hours of non-stop music. This officially completed the "trade" in ownership. 97.1 FM continued to simulcast 107.5 FM until November 2000, when it flipped to Rhythmic CHR (it now operates as a part of the K-Love network).

In 2004, afternoon "boss jock" Barry Kaye left the station.

=== Classic hits: 2005-2009 ===
The following year, in 2005, KLDE dropped any link to "Oldies" whatsoever, playing a mix of classic Top 40 known as classic hits, under the moniker "Houston's 107.5 KLDE", adopting the slogan "The Greatest Hits of the 60s & 70s." The station was also the first to launch HD digital radio in the Houston market in January 2005, and the HD-2 channel was a mix of pre-1964 oldies.

On July 10, 2006, the station changed branding to "107.5 The New K-Hits, Houston's home for the Greatest Hits of the 60's and 70's". While it did not flip formats or fire all the DJs, it did fire the morning team, to be replaced by longtime KRBE APD/afternoon DJ Scott Sparks. The KLDE calls remained in place until December 14, 2006, when the station changed its call letters to KHTC.

=== Classic rock: 2009-present ===
On January 27, 2009, the station announced the addition of Dean and Rog from KKRW effective June 1, 2009. Following this announcement, on May 17, 2009, the station changed its call letters, initially without explanation, to KGLK. On June 1, 2009, the station changed its branding to "107.5 The Eagle", and adopted a Classic Rock-leaning approach, but officially remained a Classic Hits station.

In June 2011, after years of low ratings, Cox announced that sister station KHPT would begin simulcasting KGLK's programming effective June 20. KHPT previously ran an Alternative format branded as "The Zone", which, in turn, was a replacement for the previous all-'80s hits format known as "The Point".

When KKRW changed its format to urban on December 31, 2013, KGLK, in response, officially reclaimed itself as a Classic Rock station later that day and changed its slogan to "Houston's Only Classic Rock."

In April 2023, it was announced that Urban One would acquire the Houston radio cluster of Cox Media Group.

In December 2024, the Dean & Rog show exited the station, with all four members of the show being fired.

== FM translator ==
logo for KGLK-HD3, branded as "106.1 HUM FM"

K291CE (106.1 FM, Hum FM Radio) is a South Asian format that is broadcast on KGLK-HD3 and a 190 watt relay translator at 106.1. K291CE is owned by Primera Iglesia Evangelica de Apostoles y Profetas—a Hispanic church—and leased to Hum Tum Radio, who also leases out KGLK HD-3. Hum Tum Radio/Hum FM is owned by Rehan Siddiqi, a South Asian concert promoter who previously ran the format on several brokered AM stations in Houston, San Antonio, and Dallas. The 106.1 signal is strong in Southwest Houston, Sugar Land, and Missouri City, areas with a large and growing South Asian population.

Broadcast translator for KGLK-HD3
Call sign	Frequency	City of license	FID	ERP (W)	HAAT	Class	Transmitter coordinates	FCC info
K291CE	106.1 FM	Sugar Land, Texas	147704	245	309 m (1,014 ft)	D	29°45′37″N 95°21′50″W	LMS

== Former jocks ==
Former on-air personalities on KGLK include Susie "Carr" Loucks, Paul Christy, Ted Carson, Joe Ford, Barry Kaye, Michael "Vee" Valdez, Joe Martelle, Linda Cruz, Eddie Cruz, Mike McCarthy, Kevin Charles, Janice Dean, RC Rogers, J.D.Houston, Sheree Bernardi, Sean O'Neel, Col. St. James, Jerry Pelletier, Mark Megason, Bill Campbell, Dave E. Crockett, Ron Parker, Jackie Robbins, Kenny Miles, Ron Leonard, Bob Ford, Donna McKenzie, Chuck Contreras, The Catfish, Blake Lawrence, Sheri Evans, Ken Sasso, Bob Edwards and Suzi Hanks.

== On-Air Lineup ==
Mornings

- Outlaw Dave

Middays

- J.T. (Jennifer Tyler)

Afternoons

- SPARKS (Scott Sparks)

Nights

- Doug O'Brien

== Callsign and moniker history ==
- KLJT - June 11, 1964
- KGOL - March 18, 1974 (Christian "107 KGOL")
- KZFX - August 5, 1986 (Z107)
- KRQT - October 31, 1994 (Rocket 107.5)
- KTBZ - May 12, 1995 (107.5 The Buzz)
- KLDE - July 18, 2000 (Oldies 107.5, Houston's 107.5 KLDE)
- KHTC - December 14, 2006 (107.5 The New K-Hits)
- KGLK - May 17, 2009 (The Eagle - Houston's Classic Hits Station)
- KGLK - December 31, 2013 (The Eagle - Houston's Only Classic Rock Station)
