= Post Oak Central =

Skyscraper complex in Houston, Texas

Coordinates: 29.746°N 95.462°W

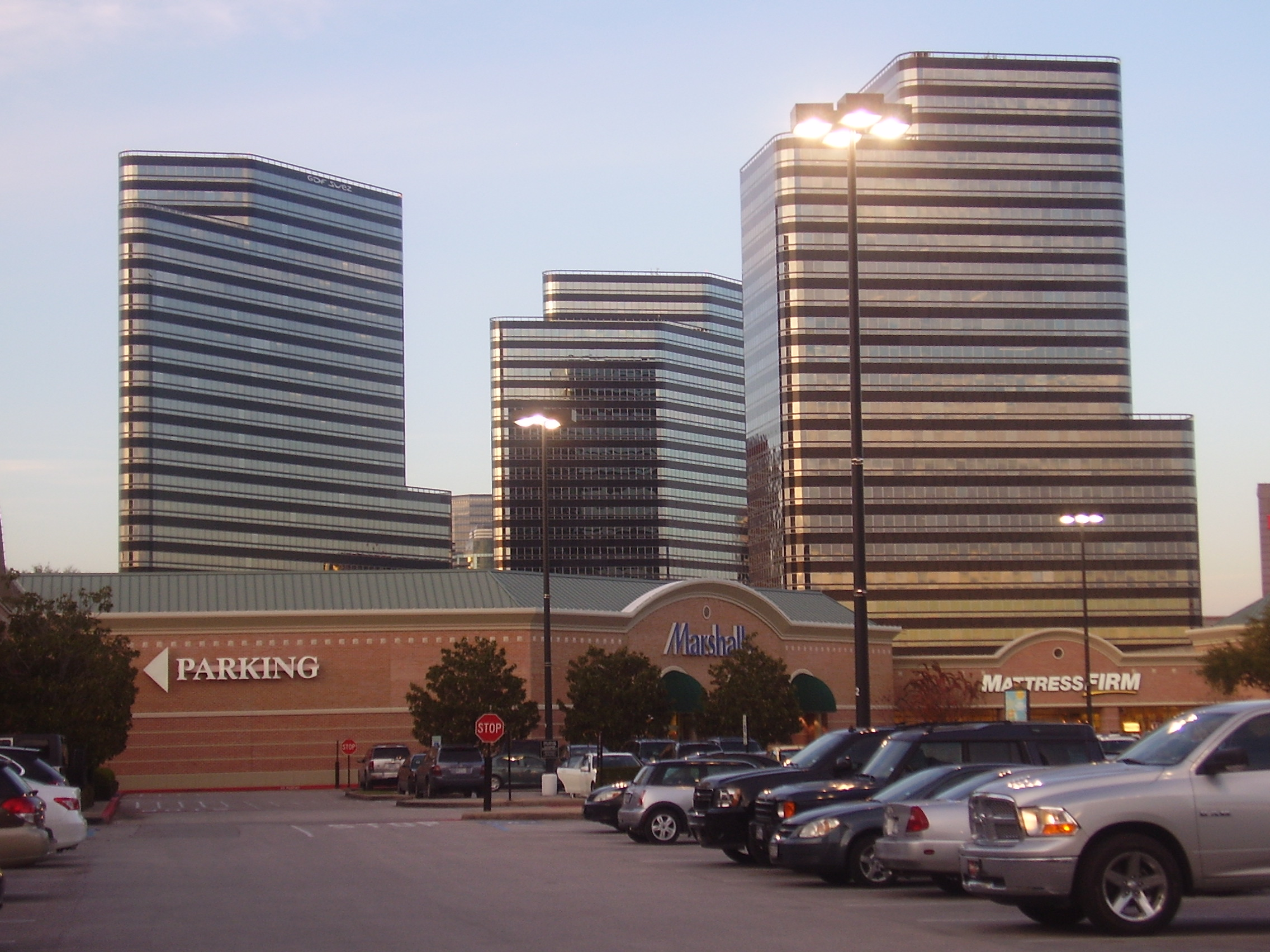
Post Oak Central consists of the three striped buildings in this image

Post Oak Central is a skyscraper complex in Uptown Houston, Texas, United States.

The 17-acre (69,000 m^{2}) Philip Johnson-designed complex includes three 24-story buildings, 1 Post Oak Central (2000 Post Oak Boulevard), 2 Post Oak Central (1980 Post Oak Boulevard), and 3 Post Oak Central (1990 Post Oak Boulevard), and a parking garage. The complex includes 1,300,000 square feet (120,000 m^{2}) of Class A office space and retail. The complex includes a 90,000-square-foot (8,400 m^{2}) retail center and parking for 4,200 cars.

== History ==
1 Post Oak Central opened in 1975. 2 Post Oak Central opened in 1979. 3 Post Oak Central opened in 1982.

In 2011 Crescent announced that it plans to build, on the 2-acre (0.81 ha) park property, buildings for retail operations.

== Tenants ==
The former headquarters of APA Corporation was at 1 Post Oak Central, Suite 100.

2 Post Oak Central has the headquarters of the Stewart Title Guaranty Company. In addition the headquarters of the Uptown Management District are in Suite 1580.

3 Post Oak Central has the headquarters of GDF Suez Energy Resources NA. In addition it contains three consulates, those of Qatar (Suite 810), South Korea (Suite 1250), and Turkey (Suite 1300). The Houston Korean Education Center, belonging to the consulate, is in Suite 750.

The Cox Radio Houston cluster of KKBQ, KGLK, and KHPT, occupy Suite 2300. Gymboree Play & Music has a classroom location in Suite C.

=== Former tenants ===
From its founding on May 25, 1982 to April 1988, the Consulate-General of Indonesia in Houston was located in Post Oak Central. The Consulate-General of Egypt in Houston was located in Suite 2180. As of 2008 the consulate is now at 5718 Westheimer Road, out of the complex. The Consulate of India was previously in Suite 600. It had been located in the 11,353-square-foot (1,054.7 m^{2}) space since the consulate opened in October 1995. On August 30, 2011, the consulate moved into a new standalone facility at 4300 Scotland.

== Gallery ==
The consulates are in 3 Post Oak Central.

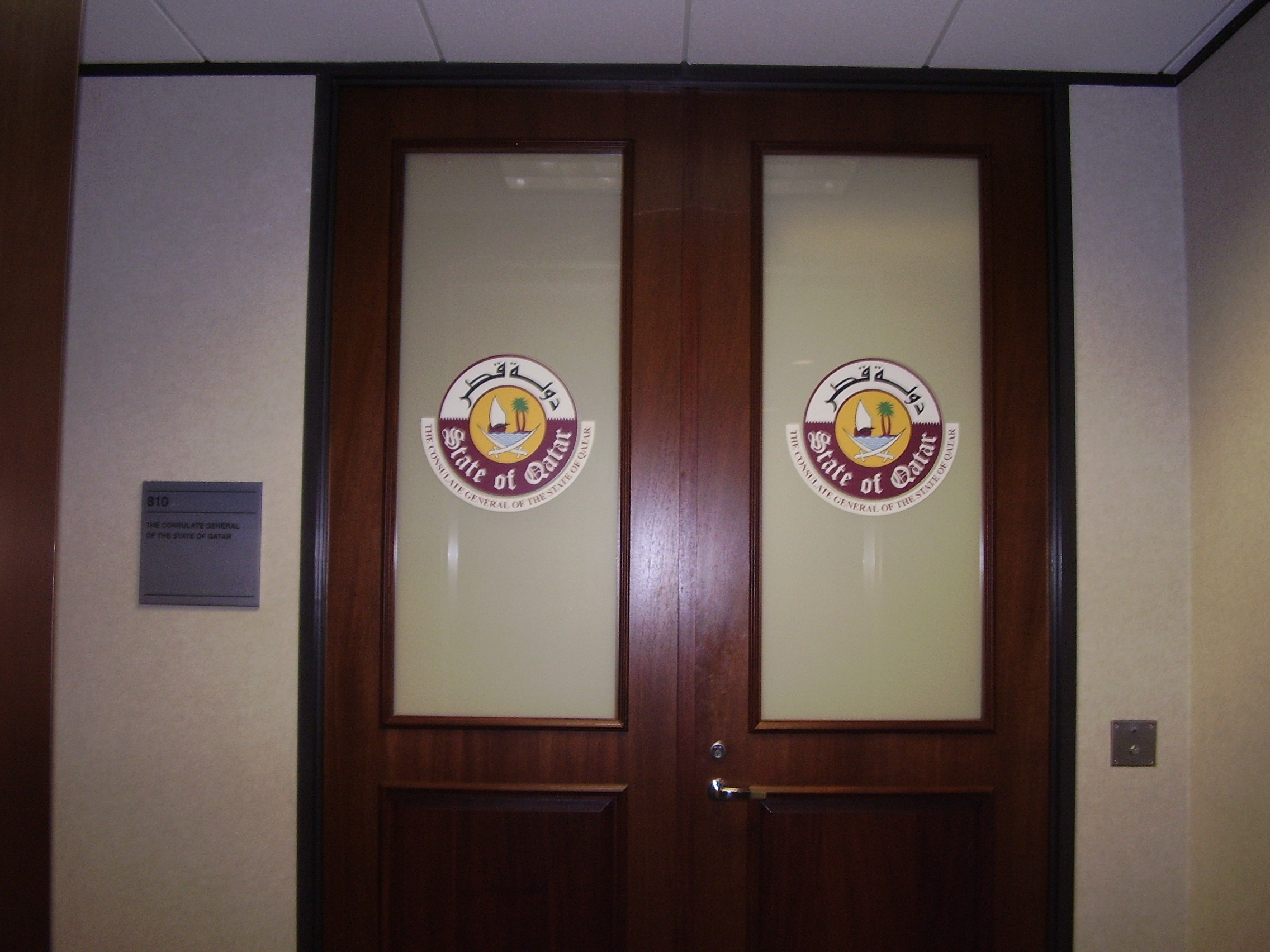
Consulate-General of Qatar in Houston (Suite 810)

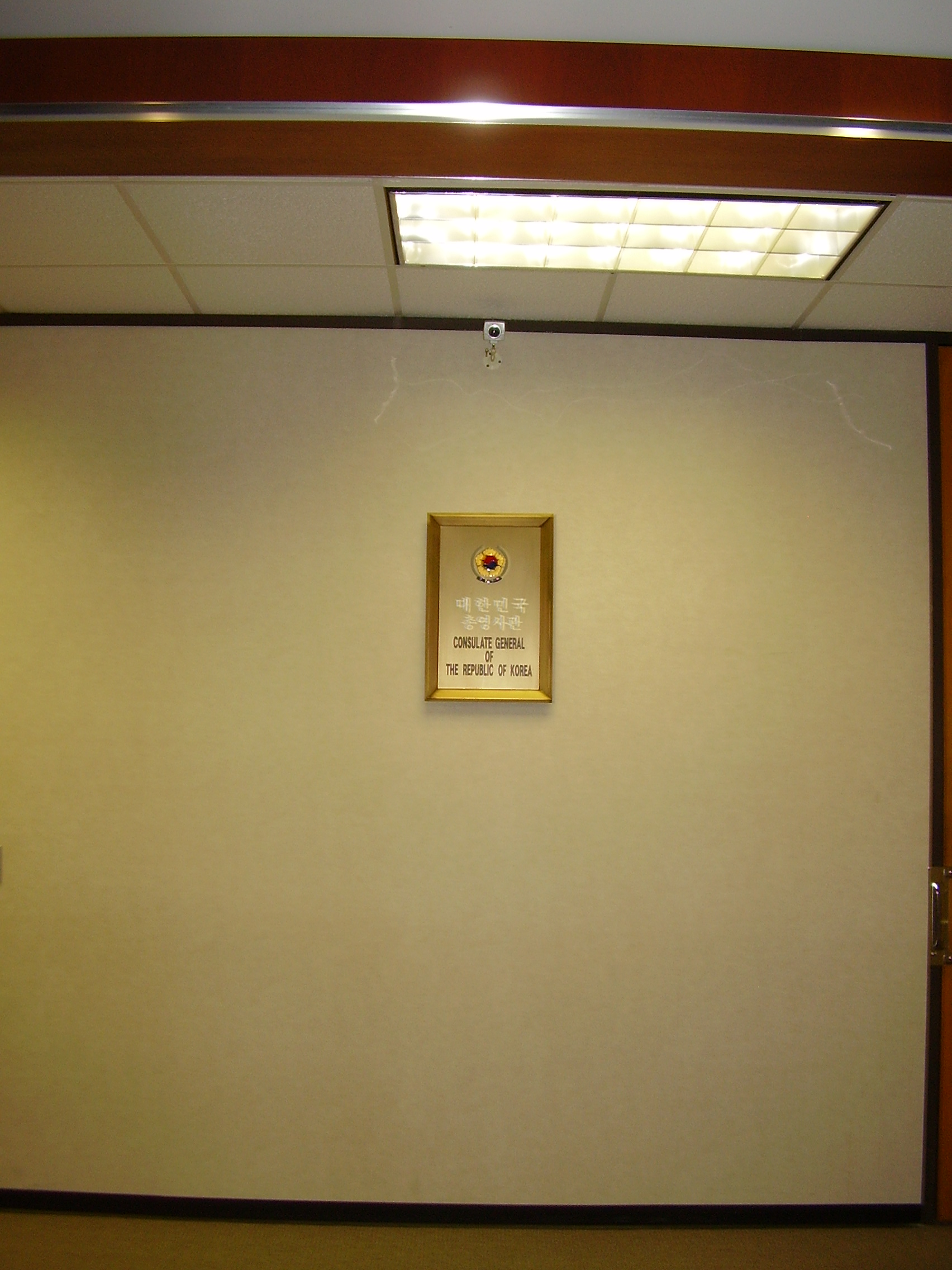
Consulate-General of South Korea in Houston (Suite 1250)

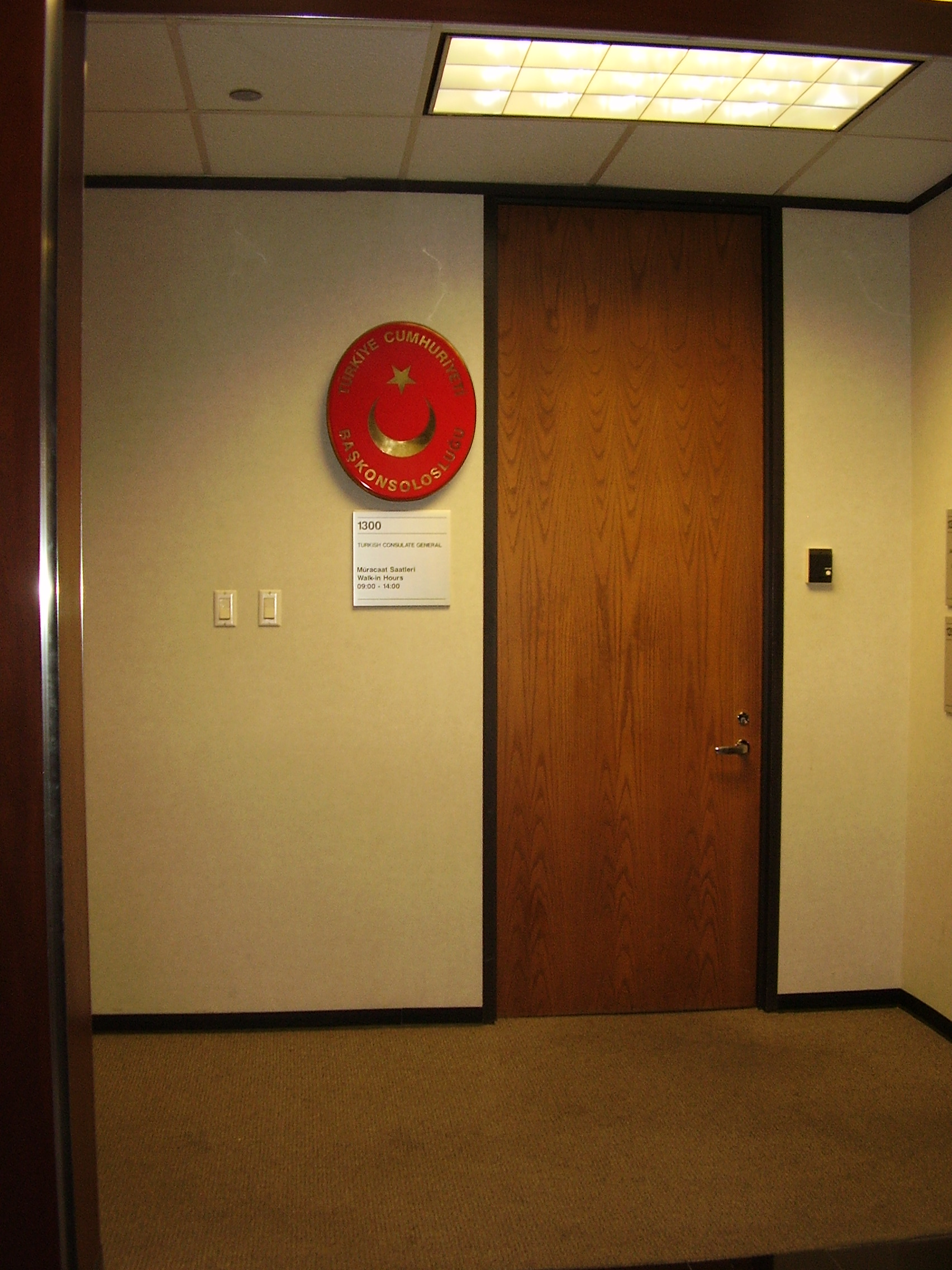
Consulate-General of Turkey in Houston (Suite 1300)
