= KKBQ =

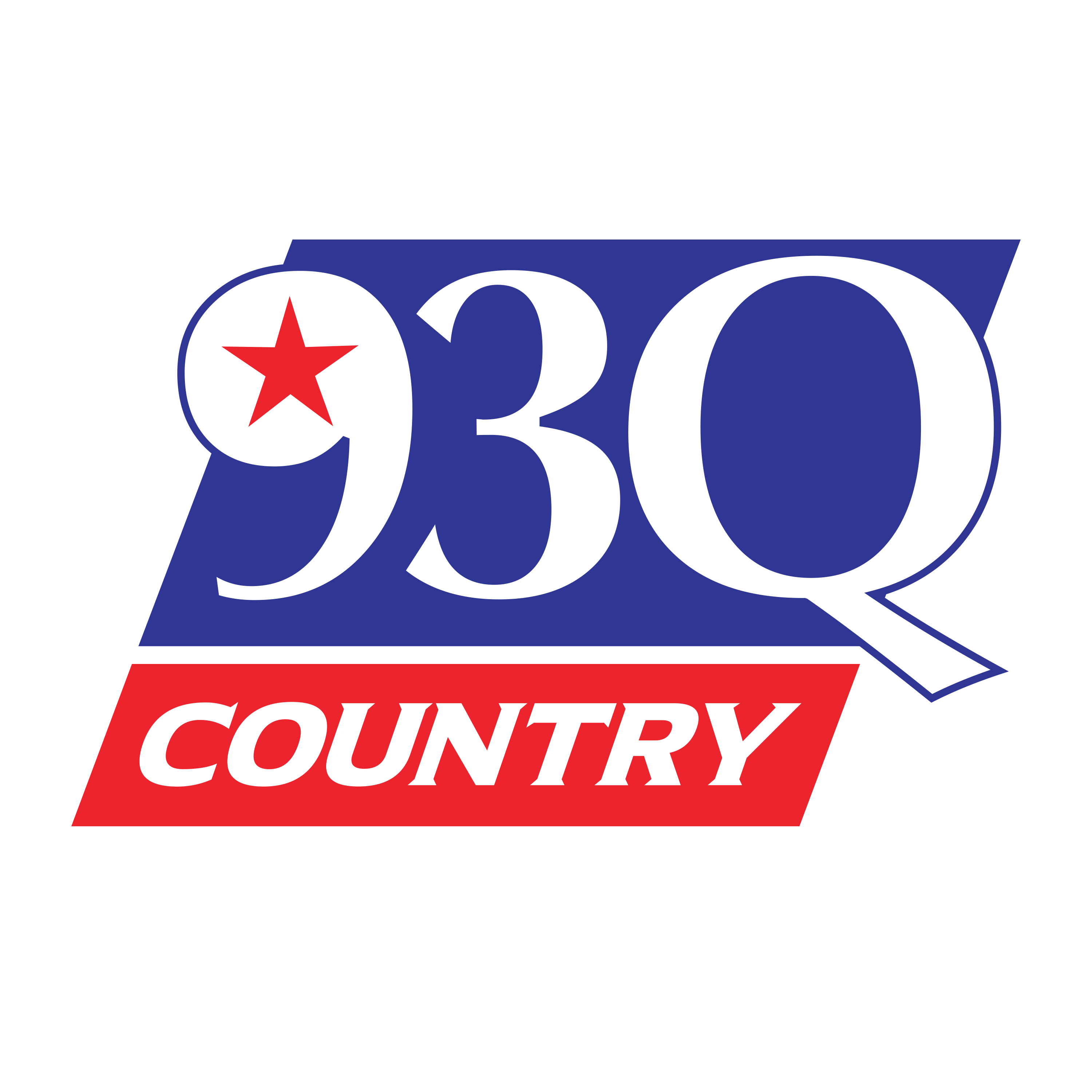
- Pasadena, Texas; United States
- Broadcast area: Greater Houston
- Frequency: 92.9 MHz (HD Radio)
- Branding: 93Q

Programming
- Language: English
- Format: Country
- Subchannels: HD2: Pasadena Rodeo Radio (Classic country); HD3: Texas country

Ownership
- Owner: Urban One; (Radio One Licenses, LLC)
- Sister stations: KGLK; KHPT; KMJQ; KBXX

History
- First air date: August 1962; 64 years ago (as KLVL-FM)
- Former call signs: KLVL-FM (1962–69); KFMZ (1969–70); KYED (1970–71); KYND (1969–83); KKBQ-FM (1983–2016)
- Former frequencies: 92.5 MHz (1962–83)
- Call sign meaning: Carried over from the former KKBQ (790 AM)

Technical information
- Licensing authority: FCC
- Facility ID: 23083
- Class: C
- ERP: 100,000 watts
- HAAT: 585 meters (1,919 ft)
- Transmitter coordinates: 29°34′34″N 95°30′36″W

Links
- Public license information: Public file; LMS
- Webcast: Listen live Listen live (via Audacy); HD2: Listen live
- Website: www.93qcountry.com rodeoradiohouston.com (HD2)

KKBQ (92.9 FM), branded as "93Q Country", is a commercial radio station with a country music format. KKBQ is licensed to Pasadena, Texas, serving the Greater Houston area. The station is owned by Urban One, and is part of a Houston radio cluster that includes KGLK, KHPT, KMJQ and KBXX. Studios and offices are located in Suite 2300 at 3 Post Oak Central in the Uptown district in Houston, and its transmitter site is near Missouri City off Farm-to-Market Road 2234.

== History ==
=== Early years ===
The station signed on at 92.5 FM in August 1962 as KLVL-FM, Houston's first Spanish-language FM station, "La Voz Latina".

In 1969, the station's original owner, Felix Morales, sold station for $175,000 in cash to Sudbrink Broadcasting. The callsign was changed to KFMZ and the format changed to MOR during the day and oldies at night. Its transmitter facilities were located on the top of the Pasadena State Bank building (demolished in July 2019), operating with 15 kilowatts effective radiated power. Due to complaints from KFMK, the calls were changed to KYED (on air moniker was "Keyed"), which aired paid religious programming during the day and oldies at night.

=== Beautiful "Kind 92" KYND ===
After upgrading to a powerful 100,000–watt signal atop the new One Shell Plaza in 1971 to cover the entire Houston market, the station changed its call letters to KYND ("Kind 92") and adopted the syndicated Beautiful Music format of Stereo Radio Productions. Soon after this upgrade, Sudbrink sold KYND for over $2 million, over a tenfold return on his original investment. KYND grew to be the dominant beautiful music outlet in Houston, and in 1976 became the first FM radio station to top the Houston radio ratings.

=== 93Q ===
On July 2, 1982, The New 79Q was launched on 790 AM KULF with a Top 40 format. The morning show was composed of John Lander and the Q-Morning Zoo, and proved to be an instant success. The station acquired the KKBQ callsign on August 13, 1982.

The station's owners decided to add the Top 40 format to KYND, its beautiful music format was beginning to see a decline in ratings as younger listeners thought of the format as "elevator music."

On December 29, 1982, at 6:00 a.m., "Houston's Stereo Combination" (a term coined by morning host John Lander since 790 AM was in AM stereo, originally the Kahn ISB and later the Motorola C-QUAM format) was born as KYND became The New 93KBQ, simulcasting part of the day on KKBQ (AM). The first song played was "Eye of the Tiger" by Survivor. The same song was used for the launch of WHTZ in New York City on August 2, 1983.

The FM acquired the KKBQ-FM callsign two months later in February 1983.

Later on, the station rebranded, first as "93FM", and finally to the more famous "93Q", in 1986. Incidentally, in the formats' early years on FM, listeners were heard during call-ins erroneously referring to the station as "Q93" or "93Q". The station, which had been transmitting from One Shell Plaza downtown since 1970, was scheduled to move to the Senior Road tower on the southwest side of town in late 1982, and move frequencies from 92.5 to 92.9, but that tower collapsed as construction neared completion. It would take nearly another year before a new tower could be built, and KKBQ moved from 92.5 to 92.9 when it was completed in October 1983. This move also accommodated the incoming 92.1 FM in Seabrook, Texas.

For a time, the AM station ran the morning show live from the FM. The rest of the day the two stations ran the same playlist, but slightly delayed on the AM side, which ran identical IDs, promos, and jock announcements customized for the AM. (At the time, the Federal Communications Commission did not allow AM and FM stations to fully simulcast in medium and larger cities.) This practice continued until the late 1980s, when it became a full-time simulcast, after the FCC relaxed its simulcasting rules. The simulcast would continue until January 16, 1998, when the AM flipped to adult standards.

==== Growth ====
The Q Morning Zoo gained increased exposure in 1985. The show incorporated comedy bits with a Top-40 playlist. On October 5, 1985, John Lander and the Morning Zoo began broadcasting "Hit Music USA," a syndicated weekend show on 100 radio stations around the country. The show was also selected as one of Continental Airlines's inflight music channels. In fall 1985, the Arbitron ratings listed KKBQ as the number two station in the Houston market.

The following year, radio personality John Carrillo (known on-air as John Rio), left the Q Morning Zoo and moved to Houston station KSRR. KKBQ sued Carrillo to prevent him from using his character, Mr. Leonard. Carrillo countersued the station, and the lawsuit ended in a settlement allowing Carrillo to use the character on air, and allowing KKBQ deejays to also use the character.

In 1987, KKBQ won the Houston Association of Radio Broadcasters' Award for Local/Retail Station Promotion.

==== Rivalry with KRBE ====
In mid-1985, KRBE dropped its Adult Contemporary format and flipped back to top 40/CHR as "Hottest Hits 104 KRBE"; then, soon after, morphed to "Power 104", and went head to head with KKBQ throughout the remainder of the 1980s.

In mid-1987, KRBE took a lean towards dance and began weekend mixshows called "The Friday and Saturday Night Power Mix". To counter, KKBQ began its own weekend mixshow, Club 93Q. In January 1988, KRBE retaliated by going on location with The Saturday Night Power Mix to a nightclub with the house DJ mixing live on the air. KKBQ scrambled for the next five months to find a club to host a live mixshow. On May 29, 1988, KKBQ launched its first ever weekly live broadcast, called 93Q Live On the Cutting Edge from Club 6400." The music skewed towards an 18+ crowd and eschewed Top 40 hits; true to the show's name, it was a mix of industrial, EBM, new wave, gothic rock, synthpop and Hi-NRG dance. Ironically, a good amount of the music on 93Q Live On The Cutting Edge had actually been heard previously on KRBE's Saturday Night Power Mix.

KKBQ beat KRBE at its own game, and the Club 6400 shows set the standard for future mixshows on radio stations throughout Houston. The Club 6400 shows became so popular among Houston's youthful set that the term "6400 music" became a collective reference for the types of music played at the club, and the reference, to this day, is still understood by many Houstonians in their late 30s to early 50s.

=== Flip to Country ===
By the winter of 1990, Arbitron ratings showed that KKBQ had lost market share in Houston, falling to ninth (from second in the Fall of 1988). The drop continued; by the Spring of 1991, the station was 13th in the Arbitron ratings. In an attempt to stem the ratings drop, the station declined to renew John Lander's contract as lead morning show personality.

On March 11, 1991, KKBQ introduced its new Morning Zoo, starring veteran deejay Cleveland Wheeler, who had pioneered the Zoo format while working for WRBQ-FM in Tampa Bay, Florida. Along with his cohosts Nancy Alexander and T.R. Benker, Wheeler planned to introduce a more positive and energetic show, focusing on local comedy routines rather than nationally syndicated comedy, and he vowed to stop playing rap music. The Morning Zoo was officially cancelled on August 17, 1991. At the same time, KKBQ quietly dropped its nine-year-old format and replaced it with a "rock hits" playlist. Featuring music by artists such as Depeche Mode, 38 Special, Tom Petty and Bryan Adams, the new format was designed to appeal to older listeners.

By this time, country music had become the most popular radio format in the United States, reaching almost 40% of the U.S. adult population each week. Between 1990 and 1992, country record and concert revenues had doubled. To improve the station's ratings woes, management decided to change course and flip to the growing format. At Midnight on September 19, 1991, after playing "Wind of Change" by The Scorpions, KKBQ began stunting with ocean wave sounds. At 6 a.m. that day, KKBQ flipped to a new "easy country" format, branded as “92.9 Easy Country.” The "easy country" format was a country music version of adult contemporary, aimed at an older audience. The first song played in its entirety on this new version of the station was George Strait's "You Look So Good in Love". With the exception of Danny Garcia, all of the other deejays were let go, as the station thought they were more "young, CHR type jocks".

The format change did not help their ratings, as KKBQ sank to 17th in the Houston market in 1992. On September 11, 1992, the station moved away from the easy country format to target a younger audience. Now known as "93Q Country", the station became "surprisingly successful playing youthful country acts and adopting an on-air personality that is up-tempo and more like Top 40 radio". Despite the new format, 93Q recycled some of the jingles, laser sound effects, stingers, and music beds from the CHR days. The new morning show team was Steven Craig, formerly of WYTZ in Chicago, and Nancy Alexander, a hold-over from the CHR days. Harley Colt handled middays, while afternoon drive time was hosted by Cactus Jack Talley (better known as Jack Da Wack of both WEZB in New Orleans and WHTZ in New York City), and Charlie "Shotgun" Walker handled nights.

By 1994, the station had become the number one country station in Houston in the coveted 18–34 age group and was the number two station overall in the area. Later that year, they were named the Country Music Radio Station of the Year by Billboard Magazine and Airplay Monitor. In spring 1995, KKBQ pulled ahead of local rival KILT-FM in the Arbitron ratings for the first time. That year, they were again named Country Station of the Year by Billboard Magazine, and their program director Dene Hallam was named program director of the year. The following year, the station was named Major Market Radio Station of the Year by the Country Music Association, beating out KILT. They repeated their win as Best Station of the Year at the Billboard/Airplay Monitor Radio Awards in 1997, again beating local rival KILT.

In 2006, KKBQ was nominated for a Country Music Association Award for Station of the Year – Major Market, and has won once.

In 2013, KKBQ won the NAB's Marconi Award for Country Station of the Year. In 2014, the station picked up another Marconi from the NAB, being named Major Market Station of the Year.

The station has also won the Billboard/Airplay Monitor Radio Awards award for Best Country Station three times.

The station dropped the -FM suffix to its call sign and became the current KKBQ on April 21, 2016.

==== Ownership changes ====
Evergreen Media Corporation purchased KKBQ from the Pacific and Southern Company (a subsidiary of Gannett Corporation) in April 1997, as Gannett was divesting itself of all of its radio stations. At that time, Arbitron ranked KKBQ as the seventh most popular station in Houston. It was estimated that KKBQ was priced around $100 million, making it the single highest-priced radio station sold in Houston to that point. Shortly after the acquisition, Evergreen merged with Chancellor Broadcasting to become Chancellor Media Corporation. In October 1999, Clear Channel Communications purchased Chancellor (then known as AMFM, Inc.), thus gaining control of KKBQ. As part of a required divestiture to meet federal ownership regulations, Clear Channel sold KKBQ to Cox Radio in March 2000. Cox vowed to have KKBQ run fewer advertisements.

In April 2023, it was announced that Urban One would acquire the Houston radio cluster of Cox Media Group.

=== On-Air Lineup ===
Mornings

- Riggs, Katelyn & Erica

Middays

- Gerardo

Afternoons

- Lauren "Lo" Sessions

Nights

- 93Q Neon Nights

== Moniker history ==
- The New 93KBQ (1982–1983)
- 93FM KKBQ FM (1983–1985)
- Hot Hits 93Q (1985–1987)
- Hot 93Q (1987–1988)
- 93Q (1988–1991)
- Houston's Rock Hits 93Q (stunt) (August 1991-September 1991)
- 92.9 Easy Country (September 1991-September 1992)
- 93Q Country (September 1992 – 2000) Fresh Country Hits
- The New 93Q (2000–2022) 52 Minutes of Q-Country Every Hour
- 93Q - "Houston's Country Leader"

== HD Radio ==
KKBQ airs a classic country format on its HD2 subchannel and a Texas Country format on its HD3 subchannel.

On August 15, 2025, KKBQ-HD2 rebranded as "Rodeo Radio" (was "Country Legends 92.9 HD2"). Ahead of the annual Pasadena Livestock Show and Rodeo, Urban One reached an agreement in July 2026 with said service to temporarily rebrand the HD format as "Pasadena Rodeo Radio", retaining the classic country format, but notably adding sweepers narrated by rodeo executive board vice president Bear Herbert airing twice-hourly highlighting the history and local impact of the rodeo.
