= KLTW (FM) =

- Winnie, Texas; United States
- Broadcast area: Beaumont/Port Arthur/Orange/Golden Triangle
- Frequency: 105.3 MHz (HD Radio)
- Branding: Radio Nueva Vida

Programming
- Language: Spanish
- Format: Christian radio
- Subchannels: HD2: K-Love; HD3: K-Love 2000s
- Affiliations: Radio Nueva Vida

Ownership
- Owner: Educational Media Foundation
- Sister stations: KHJK, KLVH

History
- First air date: November 1989; 36 years ago (as 104.9 KRTX in Galveston)
- Former call signs: KRTX (1987–1996); KLTP (1996–1998); KLTO (1998–2004); KPTI (2004–2009); KPTY (2009–2014); KXXF (2014–2023)

Technical information
- Licensing authority: FCC
- Facility ID: 479
- Class: C2
- ERP: 50,000 watts
- HAAT: 150 meters (490 ft)

Links
- Public license information: Public file; LMS
- Website: nuevavida.com

KLTW (105.3 MHz) is a non-commercial FM radio station licensed to Winnie, Texas and serving the Golden Triangle. It airs a Spanish Christian radio format and is owned and operated by Educational Media Foundation.

KLTW has an effective radiated power (ERP) of 50,000 watts. The transmitter is on Route 73 at Azalea Drive in Winnie.

== History ==
The Federal Communications Commission (FCC) granted a construction permit to start a new FM station in Galveston on July 14, 1987. The original call sign was KRTX and it broadcast on 104.9 MHz, with a power of 3,000 watts. In November 1989, it signed on the air. It was owned by the Breckenridge Broadcasting Company and it aired a country music format.

On July 19, 1996, the call sign was changed to KLTP. The call sign was changed to KLTO on August 1, 1998. In 2003, the station was acquired by Tichenor Media, which flipped it to a Spanish language format. Tichenor was later acquired by Univision, the biggest Spanish-language television network in the U.S. The station's city of license was changed to Winnie, serving the Golden Triangle, including Beaumont, Port Arthur and Orange. The dial position switched to 105.3.

On November 8, 2004, the call sign was changed to KPTI and the station began simulcasting the rhythmic contemporary format of its sister station KPTY 104.9 FM in Deer Park, Texas. KPTI was re-constructed after being destroyed by Hurricane Ike in September 2008.

On February 28, 2014, Excel Media purchased KPTY from Univision for $525,000. Excel Media changed the call sign to KXXF on March 21, 2014. Excel was owned by Jim Walton, who launched the station with continuous plays of the Walton & Johnson syndicated wake-up show, which he co-hosted.

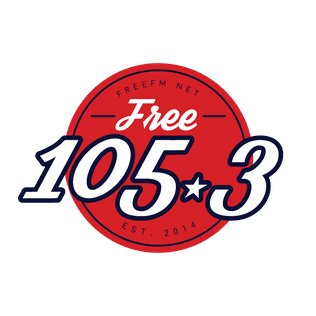
Former logo as Free 105.3

On April 8, 2014, KXXF ended stunting with Walton & Johnson episodes. It switched to a Texas-focused adult hits format (encompassing country, blues, classic rock and classic hits) and branded as "105.3 Free." It continued to carry The Walton & Johnson Show for AM drive time.

On August 16, 2017, Jim King (Jim King of the Road) was hired by John Walton to host middays on KXXF. King's show began airing in mid-September, 2017.

On September 4, 2017, the station moved from adult hits to classic country while keeping the "105.3 Free" branding.

Owner John Walton died on July 1, 2019.

On December 1, 2019, KXXF became a classic hits station, adding more rock and pop oldies to its playlist.

On May 10, 2023, Excel Media and Walton's estate sold the station to Educational Media Foundation for $610,000. EMF debuted its K-Love programming there on June 1, 2023. The sale to Educational Media Foundation was consummated on September 19, 2023. On October 20, 2023, the station changed its call sign to KLTW.

In October 2025, KLTW switched to the Spanish Christian Radio Nueva Vida network.
