= KHPT =

Simulcasts KGLK, Lake Jackson
- Conroe, Texas; United States
- Broadcast area: Greater Houston
- Frequency: 106.9 MHz (HD Radio)
- Branding: Houston's Eagle @ 106.9 & 107.5

Programming
- Language: English
- Format: Classic rock
- Subchannels: HD2: The Point (Adult hits); HD3: La Nueva (Christian)

Ownership
- Owner: Urban One; (Radio One Licenses, LLC)
- Sister stations: KGLK; KKBQ; KMJQ; KBXX

History
- First air date: February 14, 1965
- Former call signs: KNRO-FM (1965–78); KMCV (1978–81); KJOJ (1981–90); KJZS (1990–92); KKHU (1992); KKZR (1992–95); KKHT (1995–2000); KZJZ (2000)
- Call sign meaning: Houston's Point (former format)

Technical information
- Licensing authority: FCC
- Facility ID: 69564
- Class: C
- ERP: 91,600 watts
- HAAT: 579 meters (1,900 ft)
- Transmitter coordinates: 30°13′53″N 95°7′26″W
- Translator: HD3: 101.7 K269GT (Houston)

Links
- Public license information: Public file; LMS
- Webcast: Listen live Listen live (via Audacy)
- Website: www.houstonseagle.com

KHPT (106.9 FM, "Houston's Eagle @ 106.9 & 107.5") is a classic rock-formatted radio station licensed to Conroe, Texas, which simulcasts KGLK (107.5 FM). It is owned by Urban One, and is part of a five station Houston cluster that also includes KGLK, KBXX, KKBQ and KMJQ. It is headquartered in Suite 2300 at 3 Post Oak Central in the Uptown district in Houston, Texas. KHPT's transmitter is located in Splendora, Texas, once shared with KSBJ.

Between KHPT and KGLK, "The Eagle" covers more square miles than any station in southeast Texas.

== History ==
=== KNRO-FM ===
The station began broadcasting on February 14, 1965, with the call letters KNRO-FM. In 1968, the station began operating 24 hours a day, having previously signed off at midnight. In the early 1970s, the station aired a contemporary hits format. By 1975, the station had adopted a MOR format.

=== First religious era ===
In 1978, the station was sold Jimmy Swaggart Evangelistic Association for $803,750. The station's call sign was changed to KMCV, and the station adopted a religious format. In 1981, the station's call sign was changed to KJOJ, and contemporary Christian music was replaced with southern Gospel music. The station also aired brokered religious programming. The slogan for KJOJ was "Houston's Joy of Jesus." During the 1980s, hosts of the station's southern Gospel programming included Bert Salas, Mike Sheeran, and Lyle Countryman.

In 1989, the station was sold to Six Chiefs Company for $8 million. The station would go on to air a contemporary Christian format, as part of a simulcast with KGLF-FM in Freeport, Texas.

=== Early 1990s formats ===
On December 25, 1990, the call sign KJOJ moved from 106.9 to 103.3 in Freeport, and the station's call sign was changed to KJZS. The station adopted a new AC / smooth jazz format. In March 1992, the station's call sign was changed to KKHU, and it became "You 106.9", airing a hot talk/oldies hybrid format. In September 1992, the station's call sign was changed to KKZR and the station became "Z-Rock 106.9", airing ABC Radio Networks' satellite-fed Z-Rock network from Dallas.

=== The Word ===
In early 1995, the station was purchased by Salem Communications, a company that specializes in Christian radio stations, for $12 million. In March 1995, the station adopted a Christian talk and teaching format, airing programming such as Truth for Life with Alistair Begg, In Touch with Dr. Charles Stanley, Focus on the Family with James Dobson, and Janet Parshall's America. The station was branded "The Word". In 1998, Salem Communications built a new 1,928 foot tower for the station, in Splendora. It was the tallest religious broadcasting tower in the world at the time. In 2000, Salem sold the station to Cox Radio, and in return received WALR-FM (104.7) in Atlanta, Georgia, KLUP in San Antonio, Texas, and WSUN in Plant City, Florida. "The Word" signed off at Midnight on September 28, 2000, and moved to 1070 AM. (The Word now airs on KKHT-FM.)

=== The Point ===
106.9 then began stunting with a countdown and with monikers saying "MP3 Radio" and "Radio Free Houston". In addition, the station also filed for the KZJZ call letters, which led to rumors stating that the station may return to its former smooth jazz format. On October 4, 2000, KKHT's callsign was officially changed to KZJZ and "Jazzy 106.9" signed on with Kenny G's "Songbird". However, this was only a ruse, as seconds later, "106-9 The Point" signed on, with an all-'80s hits format, playing Simple Minds' "Don't You (Forget About Me)". The call letters changed to KHPT on October 17, 2000.

=== The Zone ===
Station's logo as the Zone

At 6 a.m. on November 8, 2010, KHPT changed its format to classic alternative rock (with a 1980s and 1990s centric playlist) as "106-9 The Zone". The final song on "The Point" was Bon Jovi's "Wanted Dead or Alive", while first song on "The Zone" was Foo Fighters' "Learn to Fly". In January 2011, KHPT's format shifted to refocus on 1990s alternative rock, also adding some titles from the 2000s, with its slogan changed from "106.9 The Zone, Alternative Hits From the '80s & '90s" to "106.9 The Zone, Houston's Best Alternative Hits."

=== The Eagle simulcast ===
On June 20, 2011, KHPT began simulcasting sister station KGLK's classic rock format as "The Eagle". This was due to "The Zone" having low ratings, consistently ranging from a 0.3-1.5 share of the market. Not long afterwards, the previous 1980s-oriented adult hits format, along with "The Point" branding, was revived on the HD2 sub-channel, replacing "Pat FM", a jockless 1980s and 1990s-shifted alternative format not unlike the franchised Bob FM format.

In April 2023, it was announced that Urban One would acquire the Houston radio cluster of Cox Media Group.
