= KRBE =

Contemporary hit radio station in Houston

- Houston, Texas; United States
- Broadcast area: Greater Houston
- Frequency: 104.1 MHz (HD Radio)
- Branding: 104.1 KRBE

Programming
- Language: English
- Format: Contemporary hit radio
- Subchannels: HD2: Nash Icon
- Affiliations: Westwood One

Ownership
- Owner: Cumulus Media; (Radio License Holding SRC LLC)

History
- First air date: November 8, 1959
- Call sign meaning: Founder Roland Baker and wife Edith

Technical information
- Licensing authority: FCC
- Facility ID: 35524
- Class: C
- ERP: 100,000 watts
- HAAT: 585 m (1,919 ft)

Links
- Public license information: Public file; LMS
- Webcast: Listen live; Listen live (via Audacy); Listen live (via iHeartRadio)
- Website: www.krbe.com

KRBE (104.1 FM) is a radio station in Houston, Texas. It is owned by Cumulus Media and broadcasts a contemporary hit radio format. The studios are located in Suite 700 at 9801 Westheimer Road in western Houston.

KRBE has an effective radiated power (ERP) of 100,000 watts, the maximum for non-grandfathered FM stations in the U.S. The transmitter facilities are located on the Farm-to-Market Road 2234 near the Fort Bend Parkway in Southwest Houston. KRBE broadcasts in the HD Radio hybrid format. The HD2 subchannel carries the Nash Icon music service from co-owned Westwood One.

== History ==
=== Early days (1959–1973) ===
At 6 pm on November 8, 1959, KRBE signed on at 104.1 FM as a classical music station by owners Roland and Edith Baker. There was much naysaying about the full potential of FM radio technology and its future success, as it was a risky venture. The early FM radio receivers drifted in frequency, making the audio sound "fuzzy". This required intermittent adjustments to the analog tuning dial. Later, the "phase lock loop" circuit was invented which cured this problem. The static-free FM signal then was launched to its full commercial potential.

Initially, its studios were located at 1400 Hermann Drive in Houston. During 1961's Hurricane Carla, its tower on top of 1400 Hermann was blown down to the street below. It was rebuilt immediately.

Monthly Program Guides were provided to subscribers which detailed musical programming for each day and time of the month. A classical music competitor, KLEF 94.5, debuted in 1964.

In the late 1960s, it flipped for the first time to Top 40 hits. For a short time in the early 1970s, the station adopted an album-oriented rock format and used the moniker "Big K-Rock 104". Afterwards, the station was then simply branded as "104 KRBE".

In 1966, the station's studios were moved to 3775 Kirby Drive (now 3701 Kirby). Because of this, the station has sometimes been referred to by locals as "Kirby"; the call letters are actually derived from the station's original owners, Roland and Edith Baker ("Roland, Baker, Edith").

=== Top 40 KRBE (1973–1981) ===
In January 1973, KRBE stunted by playing Gary Glitter's "Rock And Roll Part II" for two days before launching a contemporary rock format. In the mid-1970s, KRBE took on the moniker of "Bump & Boogie", and developed a "Rock 40" format, with some dance-oriented tunes included. The studios were located on Westpark above the ACCA recording studios. At this time, it was owned by a movie theater company, the General Cinema Corporation. Bob Fauser, who had been Sales Manager at WNBC in New York City became the General Manager. Clay Gish became the program director in 1974, and launched a run that lasted until 1980. Mike Krehel became the Chief Engineer during that time and gave KRBE its "Flame Thrower" signature sound.

KRBE disc jockeys included Kenny Miles hosting "Miles in the Morning", Matt "The Man the Mighty Quinn" Guinn, Roger W.W.W. Garrett, Dwight "Shotgun" Cook, "The Original Rock 'n' Roll Wizard" Ron Haney, Butch “Butch Brady” Pitts and Tom "Rivers" Yarbrough. During this period, KRBE became the first Top 40 FM station in a large radio market to beat the dominant AM Top 40 station, topping KILT in the Arbitron ratings. In 1975, KRBE moved from Kirby Lane to the Caldwell Banker Building overlooking Interstate 610 at Westheimer Road across from The Galleria. Around this time, KRBE was purchased by Lake Huron Broadcasting.

KRBE was ranked "Station of the Year" by Bobby Poe magazine, and in 1979, was named "Major Market Rock Station of the Year", and Clay Gish was named "Major Market Rock Program Director of the Year" by Billboard Magazine.

In the late 1970s, KRBE billed itself under one of two nicknames, "Super Rock 104 KRBE" and "Houston's Super Rock", playing a mixture of Top 40 and rock hits. The station was considered among the leading Top 40 stations in the U.S. The DJ lineup included Kenny Miles (Miles in the Morning), Barry Kaye (formerly of KHJ Los Angeles), and veteran CC McCartney, Roger W.W.W. Garrett, Mat "The Mighty Quinn" Guinn, The Catfish, Jon Kelly, Dayna Steele and Bunny Taylor, KRBE's first female DJ. In October 1981, KRBE flipped to an adult contemporary format as "FM 104 KRBE".

=== Rivalry with KKBQ (1982–1990) ===
On August 21, 1984, KRBE returned to top 40 under PD Paul Christy. Not too long after, KRBE dropped the "Hottest Hits" slogan which was used from 1984 to 1985, and became "Power 104". KRBE and KKBQ competed head to head throughout the 1980s. In November 1986, Dallas-based Susquehanna Radio purchased KRBE and KENR (now known as KNTH).

In 1987, KRBE began incorporating more dance hits into its format with evening weekend studio mix shows, from 10 pm to 2 am, known as "The Friday/Saturday Night Power Mix". KKBQ matched it with its own mix shows, as "Club 93Q". By the end of 1987, Scott Sparks had been hired from Y95 in Dallas to prop up the night show with a dance-heavy sound.

Beginning on January 9, 1988, KRBE launched "The Saturday Night Power Mix Live from The Ocean Club", which was billed as Houston's first live four-hour (and later, six-hour) mix show from a nightclub. On May 29, 1988, KKBQ launched its first live nightclub broadcast, "93Q Live on the Cutting Edge" from Club 6400, a club once located at 6400 Richmond Avenue which played a mix of industrial, new wave and goth music. While KRBE's show was a little more radio friendly, it was first to play some of the music 6400 was spinning, and turned out to be a success. KRBE responded to KKBQ's 6400 Sunday nights with an in-studio mix show called "Sunday Night Power Tracks" that specialized in "rare and obscure" imported dance music, mixed by the Ocean Club's Tim Flanigan.

=== "Hits Without the Hype" (1991–96) ===
KRBE and KKBQ continued their Top 40 rivalry until 1991, when the Top 40 format was showing signs of wear due to the rise of popularity of alternative rock and hip-hop. Under Program Director Steve Wyrostok, who was recruited from sister station WAPW in Atlanta, KRBE stripped to a generic "no frills" Top 40 format, in which the station dropped "lazer FX" sound effects, and did away with prerecorded voice announcers. In addition, DJs were asked to tone down their presentations and hip hop was pulled from the playlist. Even the "Power" moniker of the 1980s was gone.

KRBE was rebranded as "104 KRBE, Hits Without the Hype", and used the "No Rap, No Screaming DJs" slogan. Rival Top 40 station KKBQ eventually flipped to an "easy country music" format on September 19, 1991, after a brief period in which it programmed a rock-oriented Top 40 mix as a stunt. Notable KRBE personalities during this time included Ryan Chase, 'Psycho' Robbie, Dancin' Dave, Joel Davis, Paul "Cubby" Bryant, John Leach, Larry Davis and Michele Fisher.

=== "The Beat" (1994–2002) ===
Despite its new "no frills" approach, KRBE continued to offer dance music through its live club mix shows with the launch of "The Beat", which replaced the previous "Friday/Saturday Night Live" broadcasting from "Bayou Mama’s" on Saturday nights from 1990 to early 1993. "The Beat" aired from 1994 to 2002, and was mixed by some of the top local DJs in the Houston area. The mix shows were broadcast from premier nightclub venues in Houston such as "The Aqua Blue Bar" in early 1994, "Shelter" from mid 1994 to early 1995, "Kaboom" from 1995 to 1996, and "The Roxy" from 1996 until its last broadcast in 2002. "The Beat" enabled KRBE to gain a worldwide audience when the station began streaming the on-air audio through its website in the late 1990s, thus billing itself "The World Famous 104 KRBE". The name "The Beat" was chosen to derail KQQK's widely speculated plans to change format from regional Mexican to Top 40 as "106.5 the Beat", which would have put them in direct competition with KRBE. (It is also speculated KRBE used the "Wild" and "Channel" monikers on its Friday night mix shows for the same reason).

=== "The New Music Zone" (1992–1996) ===
From 1992 to 1996, the station aired "The New Music Zone", an alternative music show heard weeknights from 7 pm to midnight. From 1995 to 1996, the station's playlist as a whole leaned toward alternative rock. In 1996, program director Tom Poleman and air talents Paul "Cubby" Bryant and Ryan Chase left KRBE for similar positions at WHTZ in New York City, which had also leaned in an alternative direction for a time. Ryan Chase returned to KRBE ten years later.

=== "Wire In" (1996–2003) ===
In July 1996, KRBE evolved back into a mainstream direction that also featured a significant amount of 1980s pop, presented during the week as "Retro Cuts" and highlighted with "Retro Weekends" roughly once a month. The re-emergence of pop music in the late 1990s, along with the success of Sam Malone's morning show (which, from 1997 to 2000, was syndicated to Beaumont and Kansas City), brought KRBE success in the late 1990s and into the early 2000s.

=== KRBE (2003–) ===
On October 31, 2005, the Susquehanna Radio Corporation announced it had reached an agreement to sell its radio assets, including KRBE, to a partnership including Cumulus Media (which also owned Houston radio stations KIOL-FM (103.7) and KFNC-FM (97.5) as well as Bain Capital, Blackstone Group and Thomas H. Lee Partners. The deal was completed in the first half of 2006. After the purchase, KRBE quietly changed its moniker from the longtime "104 KRBE" to "104.1 KRBE".

In late January 2006, KRBE launched its HD radio transmitter. The HD2 signal, from late 2007 until June 2012, was a simulcast of KHJK. After KHJK's sale to EMF Broadcasting in June 2012, KRBE's HD2 signal changed to 1960s and 1970s Oldies music from the True Oldies Channel. In 2014, the HD2 signal began carrying Westwood One's Good Time Oldies format. After Good Time Oldies was discontinued by Westwood One in April 2025, KRBE-HD2 flipped to the Nash Icon format.

KRBE was the flagship station for the syndicated Nights Live With Adam Bomb, from May 2012 until January 2015.

KRBE was the winner of the 2017 Marconi CHR Station of the Year Award.

During this period, KRBE competed against KKHH (Hot 95.7) from 2008 to 2016, and KROI (Radio Now 92.1) from 2017 to 2021.

=== Morning show shake-up ===
On March 4, 2005, long time morning show host Sam Malone announced that he was leaving the station for a position at KTRH. Malone was replaced by afternoon host Atom Smasher, while Maria Todd remained as co-host. On July 7, 2006, Atom and Maria were let go immediately following that day's show. Cumulus said it was taking the station in a new direction and needed a show that widely appealed to the entire Houston market and a team that knew the city and its people. On the same day of the departure of Todd and Smasher, longtime DJ Scott Sparks exited KRBE after nearly 20 years to host mornings at classic hits station KLDE (now KGLK), reuniting Sparks with former KRBE program director and morning show host Paul Christy.

On July 13, 2006, it was announced that "The Roula and Ryan Show", which had aired on KHMX, would return to Houston airwaves on KRBE. The team, which relaunched their morning show on July 24, 2006, consists of Roula Christie and Ryan Chase. He returned to KRBE after a ten-year absence, along with their producer Eric Rowe. Ironically, Christie also returned to KRBE after a six-year absence. She was paired with the aforementioned Atom Smasher from 1998 to 2000, on the 6–10 pm shift. In 2025, as part of a new five-year contract extension, it was announced that "The Roula and Ryan Show" was changed to "The Roula and Ryan Show with Eric"; however Ryan abruptly left the station on November 14.
