= KHJK =

Air 1 radio station in La Porte–Houston–Beaumont, Texas

- La Porte, Texas; United States
- Broadcast area: Greater Houston; Golden Triangle
- Frequency: 103.7 MHz
- Branding: Air1

Programming
- Language: English
- Format: Christian worship music
- Network: Air1

Ownership
- Owner: Educational Media Foundation
- Sister stations: KLTW, KLVH

History
- First air date: September 15, 1992
- Former call signs: KTDD (1990–1991, CP); KVST (1991–2005); KUST (2005); KIOL (2005–2007)
- Former frequencies: 103.5 MHz
- Call sign meaning: Former Jack FM format

Technical information
- Licensing authority: FCC
- Facility ID: 48676
- Class: C
- ERP: 100,000 watts
- HAAT: 590 meters (1,940 ft)
- Transmitter coordinates: 29°56′9″N 94°30′39″W
- Translator: 95.3 K237FS (Conroe)

Links
- Public license information: Public file; LMS
- Webcast: Listen live
- Website: air1.com

KHJK (103.7 FM) is a non-commercial radio station licensed to LaPorte, Texas, United States, serving both Greater Houston and the Golden Triangle of Beaumont, Port Arthur and Orange. It is owned by the Educational Media Foundation as part of their Air1 network.

KHJK's transmitter is sited off of Route 1410 in Devers, Texas, about halfway between Houston and Beaumont. KHJK is also relayed over low-power FM translator K237FS (95.3 FM) in Conroe, Texas.

== History ==
=== Beginnings in Huntsville ===
KHJK-FM previously operated as KVST, "K-Star Country 103.7", which was licensed to service Montgomery County, Texas, prior to being purchased by Cumulus Media in 2005.

Originally owned by Ben Amato of Conroe (who sold his chain of grocery stores around that area to finance the radio station), it signed on as KVST in Huntsville on 103.5; however, interference from KEYI (now KBPA) in Austin caused the station not to reach down to the intended audience of Conroe and a look at a move-in frequency was done. Amato moved the station's frequency up one channel to 103.7, and also physically moved the tower site south to Willis.

This resulted in an excellent signal in Conroe, Willis, and the exploding community of The Woodlands. However, the signal was all but lost in Huntsville, which was solved by Amato bringing a new station to life, licensed to Huntsville, in order to simulcast KVST. That station became KUST at 99.7 MHz.

=== Sale to Cumulus; Move to La Porte ===
Ironically, in 2005, Cumulus Media purchased the license for 103.7, and once KVST relocated to La Porte, 99.7 made the same journey down Interstate 45 that 103.7 had made in the years before it ultimately moved to the Devers tower, east of Houston.

Since then, 99.7 KVST has reversed the move and returned to Huntsville, transmitting from the original 103.5 tower.

As a part of the move of 103.7, KUST switched call letters with KVST, resulting in the new 99.7 in Willis becoming KVST, while the KUST calls were shipped to this facility. These calls were short lived as they were only used for the "TV 103" stunt format utilized while Cumulus prepared for the move of 97.5 KIOL's rock format and call letters to the debuting 103.7 signal in Houston and The Golden Triangle. KBIU in Lake Charles was also affected by the move of this facility as it also operated on the 103.7 frequency. This was resolved by Cumulus downgrading KBIU, which the company also owned, and also moving its operating frequency to 103.3.

103.7 KUST soon went dark while Cumulus moved the facility to its current location in Devers, Texas to service the Houston and Golden Triangle areas.

=== KIOL Becomes "Rock 103.7" ===
KUST officially returned to the air on May 23, 2005, simulcasting 97.5 KIOL until May 31, when KIOL's AOR format moved to 103.7 (which adopted the KIOL calls as a result) entirely, and the new station on 97.5, KFNC, signed on with an all-news format.

Prior to the KIOL move, KUST tested the new transmitting site with nonstop commercial free television themes as "TV 103".

=== Jack FM ===
On August 30, 2007, the Houston Chronicle reported that KIOL would be switching to the Jack FM format at 10:37 a.m. the following day, and adopting new call letters, KHJK Jack FM to make Houston debut. The final three songs on "Rock 103.7" were "Mary Jane's Last Dance by Tom Petty, "Cold As Ice" by Foreigner (followed by a promo that "your world will change after this song" and to "tell everyone you know to listen"), and "Fire" by Jimi Hendrix, while the first two songs on "Jack" were "Jumpin' Jack Flash" by The Rolling Stones" and "Let's Go Crazy" by Prince.

=== Move to Adult Album Alternative ===
On May 6, 2009, KHJK shifted from adult hits to AAA as "103-7FM."

=== Cumulus Divestiture; Sale to EMF ===
As part of a prepackaged bankruptcy filing, the lenders took over the license of four Cumulus Media Partners stations; two in the Kansas City metro area (KCHZ and KMJK) and the two rimshot signals in the Houston metro, KHJK and KFNC, in November 2011. Station broker Larry Patrick became majority owner and set out to sell the stations to recover the value for the lenders. After the filing, Cumulus continued to program the stations under LMA. While Cumulus could have purchased the stations back, the highest bidder for KFNC was David Gow, owner of KGOW (1560 The Game) and the highest bidder for KHJK was Educational Media Foundation, who programs Christian AC and Christian Rock formats.

EMF switched the format of KHJK to Air 1 at 5:00 p.m. on July 17, 2012. The last songs played on 103.7 FM were The Old Apartment by Barenaked Ladies, Eyes Wide Open by Gotye, Mary Jane's Last Dance by Tom Petty and the Heartbreakers, In The End by Linkin Park, Closing Time by Semisonic, and It's The End Of The World As We Know It (And I Feel Fine) by R.E.M.

Between In The End and Closing Time, KHJK voiceover Mike McKay gave this goodbye message:

"Houston, thank you. It's been an amazing ride. Steve, Donna, and the entire 103-7FM crew want to say thanks for being there for us. Attending our events, coming to our shows, and just for listening to Houston's adult alternative, 103-7FM. It's been our pleasure serving you some of the best new music out there and playing music you can't hear anywhere else but 103-7FM. You are the best listeners we could have ever asked for, and we'll miss you. Thanks again. And are you hiring?"

The first song on "Air 1" was "Me Without You" by TobyMac. The purchase of KHJK by EMF was consummated on October 15, 2012 at a price of $5 million. Because the station rimshots from Devers (where its transmitter is located), KHJK's signal is either marginal or weak in the northern and western areas of the Houston metropolitan area.

== FM translator ==
Broadcast translator for KHJK
Call sign	Frequency	City of license	FID	ERP (W)	HAAT	Class	FCC info	Notes
K237FS	95.3 FM	Conroe, Texas	148663	75	127 m (417 ft)	D	LMS	First air date: June 6, 2016

== HD radio ==
Cumulus Broadcasting began upgrading its stations to HD Radio broadcasting in 2005. One of the first ten stations to be upgraded was KIOL. The station had been simulcast on KRBE HD-2, but this was replaced by a feed of the True Oldies Channel in June 2012.
