= KMJQ =

Radio station in Houston

- Houston, Texas; United States
- Broadcast area: Greater Houston
- Frequency: 102.1 MHz (HD Radio)
- Branding: Majic 102.1

Programming
- Language: English
- Format: Urban adult contemporary
- Subchannels: HD2: Urban gospel HD3: Regional Mexican
- Affiliations: Compass Media Networks

Ownership
- Owner: Urban One; (Radio One Licenses, LLC)
- Sister stations: KBXX, KKBQ, KHPT, KGLK

History
- First air date: 1961
- Former call signs: KAJC-FM (1961–1964); KMSC (1964–1969); KLYX (1969–1977)
- Call sign meaning: "Majic" (branding)

Technical information
- Licensing authority: FCC
- Facility ID: 11971
- Class: C
- ERP: 100,000 watts
- HAAT: 524 meters (1,719 ft)
- Transmitter coordinates: 29°34′27″N 95°29′37″W
- Translator: HD3: 104.5 K283CH (Houston)

Links
- Public license information: Public file; LMS
- Webcast: Listen Live; Listen Live (HD2)
- Website: myhoustonmajic.com; praisehouston.com (HD2); www.lamejordigital.com (HD3)

KMJQ (102.1 FM, "Majic 102.1") is a commercial radio station licensed to Houston, Texas, United States, serving Greater Houston. Owned by Urban One, KMJQ features an urban adult contemporary format with studios in the Greenway Plaza district and transmitter sited on Blueridge Trail in Southwest Houston. KMJQ broadcasts in HD Radio; the HD2 subchannel carries an urban gospel format, known as "Praise 102.1 HD2 Houston"; the HD3 subchannel carries a regional Mexican format, known as "La Mejor 104.5", relayed by FM translator K283CH, also in Houston, Texas.

== History ==
=== KAJC-FM ===
In 1961, the station originally signed on the air as KAJC-FM. The station's original city of license was Alvin, Texas, where the studios and transmitter were also located.

At a time when FM typically aired beautiful music or classical music, it was the first FM station in the Houston area to broadcast adult contemporary music and hourly news. In 1962 and 1963 it became the first FM station in Texas to win major news awards from the UPI Texas Broadcasters' Association, including story of the year and best news coverage in population class.

=== KMSC ===
In 1964, the station was sold, changing its call sign to KMSC. The city of license was moved to Clear Lake City on Galveston Bay. The power was increased to 100,000 watts, greatly expanding the station's coverage of Greater Houston.

Styled as the "Voice of the Manned Spacecraft Center", KMSC broadcast news about the space program and easy listening music. In November 1969, the station call letters changed to KLYX or "Clicks," and the format changed to adult contemporary. The new format debuted on Thanksgiving Day of that year.

=== All-News KLYX ===
In 1975, KLYX became a network affiliate of new NBC News and Information Service (NIS). NBC provided 24 hours a day of all-news radio programming, with some local news inserts from KLYX. NIS aired on 102.1 from 1975 until the end of the service in early 1977. KLYX's local news inserts originated from new studios in Houston.

The station was permitted to bypass one of the FCC rules, known as the "Arizona Waiver." It was named after a Glendale, Arizona station, owned by the Arizona Broadcasting Corporation. Back when the main studio of a station had to be inside the city of license, the Arizona Waiver gave stations an out by allowing a station to air its recorded, non-network shows from an 'auxiliary' studio (in this case, Houston) while its live local public affairs shows would air from a city of license studio. This worked well with the easy listening format, as 94% of the station was recorded music and commercials. The 6% news and non entertainment items could originate from the main studio. This was expanded to let the station broadcast its local and non network shows from the Clear Lake studios.

In 1979, the community of Clear Lake City was annexed by Houston, meaning that Houston became KLYX's official city of license. In 1982, the transmitter was moved from downtown Houston (Shell Plaza tower farm, where it had been since 1973) to the new shared tower at Missouri City.

=== KMJQ ===
On February 20, 1977, "Majic 102 FM" launched as the first FM station in Houston to carry an R&B format. The call letters were changed to KMJQ on April 8, 1977. KMJQ was an instant success, debuting in second place with an 8.6 share in its first ratings survey. As disco music grew in popularity, Majic shifted to an all-disco format in June 1978 and was the number one station in Houston throughout 1978 and 1979. The format would evolve to urban contemporary as disco faded in 1980. Majic maintained its strong ratings and was the number one station in 30 of 40 surveys during the 1980s.

KMJQ was sold by Keymarket Media to the San Diego–based Noble Broadcasting in 1988; it became co-owned with KYOK months later, which transitioned from an R&B/Soul format to a full-fledged Urban Contemporary format as "YO! 1590 Raps" in the early 1990s.

In the early 1990s, KMJQ changed its branding to "Majic 102 Jams" or just simply "102 Jams". Some reggae was played in rotation during the transition, along with R&B, soul, gospel, new jack swing, jazz, funk and hip hop. It gained some competition from KHYS (now KTJM) in the mid-1980s for some time. But in 1991, KMJQ gained fierce competition from KBXX (the former KFMK) upon that station's relaunch. KBXX, then a rhythmic contemporary station (mixing in hip hop, R&B and some dance pop titles), quickly emerged as KMJQ's prime competitor for their mutual targeted audience demographic. The battle over the coveted 18–34 "urban" listening audience continued for three years, affecting KMJQ's dominance, as it fell behind KBXX and dropped in the ratings.

=== Ownership changes ===
The rivalry between KMJQ and KBXX ended in 1994, when KBXX was sold to Clear Channel Communications, who, a short time later, would buy KMJQ in 1995 from Noble, separating it from KYOK (then on 1590 AM). That year, KMJQ modified its format to urban adult contemporary and returned the "Majic 102" branding. From then on, the station focused more on R&B and classic soul music only and targeted an older audience, while co-owned KBXX focused on younger listeners.

In 2000, when Clear Channel bought out several other radio corporations (as a result of the Telecommunications Act of 1996), KMJQ and KBXX were spun off to the Washington, D.C.–based, black-owned Radio One (now Urban One). Also in 2000, KMJQ became the Houston affiliate of the nationally syndicated "Tom Joyner Morning Show" and aired it until the program ended in 2019.

In 2003, the station rebranded as "Majic 102.1" to avoid frequency confusion with Beaumont, Texas, Urban radio station KTCX ("Magic 102.5"), although longtime listeners still refer to the station as "Majic 102" based on heritage. For a brief period in 2008, the station carried Mo'Nique in the Afternoon through Radio One's syndicated division. In 2011, when KROI dropped its five-year urban gospel format for an all-news radio format, KMJQ added a digital subchannel to carry that previous format now known as "Praise Houston."

== In popular culture ==
"Majic 102 Jams!" was featured throughout the 1994 film Jason's Lyric.
