= KBXX =

Rhythmic contemporary hit radio station in Houston

- Houston, Texas; United States
- Broadcast area: Greater Houston
- Frequency: 97.9 MHz (HD Radio)
- Branding: 97.9 The Box

Programming
- Format: Rhythmic contemporary
- Subchannels: HD2: Classic hip hop HD3: Tejano music

Ownership
- Owner: Urban One; (Radio One Licenses, LLC)
- Sister stations: KMJQ, KKBQ, KHPT, KGLK

History
- First air date: February 2, 1958
- Former call signs: KFMK (1958–1991)
- Call sign meaning: "The Box" (station branding)

Technical information
- Facility ID: 11969
- Class: C
- ERP: 100,000 watts
- HAAT: 585 meters (1,919 ft)
- Transmitter coordinates: 29°34′34″N 95°30′36″W

Links
- Webcast: Listen live; Listen live (via Audacy); Listen live (via iHeartRadio)
- Website: theboxhouston.com

KBXX (97.9 FM) is a commercial radio station in Houston, Texas. It airs an urban-leaning rhythmic contemporary radio format, mostly made up of hip-hop music and R&B. It is owned by Urban One as part of a five station cluster with KMJQ, KKBQ, KHPT, and KGLK. The studios and offices are located in the Greenway Plaza district.

KBXX has an effective radiated power (ERP) of 100,000 watts. The transmitter is on Farm to Market Road 2234, near Fort Bend Parkway in Southwest Houston. It broadcasts in the HD Radio hybrid format.

Previously, the HD2 subchannel aired Vietnamese language programming, both talk and pop music. KBXX-HD2 provided the primary feed for FM translator 101.7 K269GT in Humble.

== History ==
=== As KFMK ===
The station originally signed on February 2, 1958, with an MOR music format as KFMK, but later migrated to a classical music format. By 1967, the station had moved back to an MOR format. In 1967, the studios were moved to the Memorial/Spring Branch area, and the station started focusing its programming on the suburban area, with locally focused newscasts and Spring Branch ISD sports play-by-play coverage.

In October 1967, the station started airing progressive rock at night. The underground format proved so popular that in late March 1968, the station adopted a round-the-clock progressive rock format that became known as "Mother Radio."

With no warning, the owners paid off the whole staff and took the station off the air at 4pm on March 26, 1969. The president of the station at the time, Jim Lammers, told the Houston Chronicle, "The format was not getting the kind of response we were hoping for, we were losing money and decided it was time to change."

After several weeks off the air to make technical repairs to the station's transmitting equipment, KFMK returned in May 1969 with a Southern Gospel format. After a survey of music preferences among Houston's church-going community, KFMK re-launched on October 1, 1975, with a contemporary Christian format and the slogan "The Spirit of 98".

The station was sold in 1979 and moved to an adult-leaning contemporary format, but retained the KFMK call letters. Protests over the station's abandonment of the Christian music format led that group to eventually start non-commercial contemporary Christian outlet KSBJ. During the 80s, KFMK evolved into a more gold-based AC station, before becoming all Oldies in September 1990.

=== As KBXX ===
On April 2, 1991, after a period of stunting, the station flipped to "The Box" with a new rhythmic contemporary format (alternatively referred to as "contemporary crossover" in the early years). The new KBXX callsign was implemented on April 22, 1991. It fiercely competed with longtime heritage urban station KMJQ until Clear Channel Communications bought KBXX in late 1994, then paired it with KMJQ the year after, also in that very year, KMJQ flipped to urban adult contemporary.

Despite being rhythmic, KBXX's music selection moved more toward a mainstream urban direction, focusing on hip hop and R&B music. Clear Channel spun off KBXX and KMJQ to Radio One in 2000."KBXX-FM Houston unscoped summer 2004".

The morning show had been hosted by Madd Hatta since March 2001. He had been on KBXX since 1995, starting off in afternoons, before switching to morning drive time. In December 2019, Madd Hatta left the station; the following month, he was replaced with "Good Morning H-Town", hosted initially by Jerrel 'Hardbody Kiotti' Brown and Keisha Nicole; Kiotti would be replaced by former Madd Hatta Show co-host James 'J Mac' Garrett.

== Programming ==
KBXX was moved to R&R's Urban Contemporary Airplay panel in 2006, however it still remains on Mediabase's Rhythmic Airplay Panel. In spite of having an urban-driven playlist, the station retains its rhythmic format in order to target a multicultural audience in the Houston market.
