= List of Houston Astros broadcasters =

Broadcasters for the Houston Astros Major League Baseball team.

== Play by Play ==
- Gene Elston (1962–1986)
- Loel Passe (1962–1976)
- Guy Savage (1962–1963)
- Al Helfer (1962)
- Mickey Herskowitz (1963)
- Harry Kalas (1965–1970)
- Bob Prince (1976)
- Dewayne Staats (1977–1984)
- Mike Elliott (1984)
- Larry Hirsch (1984)
- Jim Durham (1984–1985)
- Milo Hamilton (1985–2012) (only home games from 2006–2012)
- Jerry Trupiano (1985–1986)
- Bill Worrell (1986–1996, 2000–2003)
- Dave Hofferth (1987)
- Bill Brown (1987–2016) (just home games and select road games from 2013–2016)
- Bruce Gietzen (1988–1990)
- Vince Cotroneo (1991–1997)
- Brett Dolan (2006–2012) (about 1/2 of the home games (switching off and on with Dave Raymond) and all road games)
- Dave Raymond (2006–2012) (about 1/2 of the home games (switching off and on with Brett Dolan) and all road games)
- Alan Ashby (1998–2006 (radio); 2013–2016 (television) (from 1998–2006, he provided 2 innings of play-by-play on the radio and from 2013–2016, he provided play-by-play for games without Bill Brown)
- Robert Ford (2013–present)
- Steve Sparks (2013–present) (2 innings a game on radio)
- Todd Kalas (2017–present)
- Kevin Eschenfelder (2017–present)

== Color Analyst ==
- Larry Dierker (1979–1996, 2004–2005)
- Enos Cabell (1989–1994)
- Alan Ashby (radio: 1998–2005), (TV: 2013–2016)
- Jim Deshaies (1997–2012)
- Steve Sparks (2013–present)
- Geoff Blum (2013–present) (road games with Ashby and select home games, 2013–2016; home and road games 2017–present)

== Spanish ==
- René Cárdenas (1962–1977, 2007)
- Orlando Sanchez-Diago (1962–1992)
- Rolando Becerra (1987–1992)
- Francisco Ernesto Ruiz (1993–2007)
- Manny Lopez (1993)
- Danny Gonzalez (1994–1996)
- Alex Treviño (1997–Present)
- Adrian Chavarria (2006–2007)
- Enrique Vasquez (2006)
- Francisco Romero (2008–Present)

== Broadcast Outlets ==
=== Television ===
Over-the-air

- KTRK-TV (1962–1972)
- KPRC-TV (1973–1978)
- KRIV (1979–1982)
- KTXH (1983–1997, 2008–2012)
- KNWS-TV (1998–2007)

Cable

- Home Sports Entertainment/Prime Sports Southwest/Fox Sports Southwest (1983–2004)
- Fox Sports Houston (2005–2012)
- Comcast Sportsnet Houston/Root Sports Southwest/AT&T Sportsnet Southwest/Space City Home Network (2013–Present)

Note: Fox Sports Houston was originally a sub-feed of Fox Sports Southwest from 2005 to 2008; however, the Houston feed became its own standalone channel as of January 2009.
Note: Comcast Sportsnet Houston became Root Sports Southwest in November 2014 which later became AT&T Sportsnet Southwest in July 2017 which later became Space City Home Network in October 2023.

=== Radio ===
- KPRC (AM) (1962–1980, 1991–1995)
- KENR/KRBE (AM) (1981–1984)
- KTRH (1985–1990, 1999–2012)
- KILT (AM) (1996–1998)
- KBME (AM) (2013–present)

Spanish Radio

- KXTN-FM (1988)
- KXYZ (1989–2002)
- KLAT (2003–2014; 2021–present)
- KODA HD-3 (2015-2017)
- KEYH / KNTE (2018-2020)

== See also ==
- List of current Major League Baseball announcers
- Houston Astros Radio Network
