= Houston Astros Radio Network =

Official radio network of MLB's Houston Astros

- Type: Sports radio network
- Country: United States
- Availability: National, through regional affiliates and satellite radio
- Headquarters: Houston, Texas
- Owner: Houston Astros
- Established: 1962
- Former names: Colt .45s Baseball Network (1962–1965)
- Affiliates: 26
- Webcast: MLB.tv
- Official website: Astros Radio Network

The Houston Astros Radio Network is an American broadcast network of radio affiliates in operation since 1962 that broadcast coverage of the Houston Astros before, during, and after that team's games. Radio content is broadcast in both the English and Spanish languages. It consists of 26 stations (and 4 broadcast relay stations) that span across three states with its English flagship station as KBME and its Spanish flagship station as K231CE (an FM translator fed by an HD Radio signal of KODA), both in Houston. In addition to its affiliates, Houston Astros Radio Network content can be listened to on satellite radio via Sirius XM Radio and online using both MLB.tv and Sirius XM Internet Radio.

Sports commentators for the network are Robert Ford and Steve Sparks in English and Francisco Romero and Alex Treviño in Spanish. Astros games returned to KTRH in 2019, while also continuing to air on 790, KBME.

== Affiliate stations ==
City	State	Call sign	Frequency	Language
Conway	Arkansas	KCON	92.7 FM	Affiliate
Lafayette	Louisiana	KLWB-FM	103.7 FM	Affiliate
Lake Charles	Louisiana	KLCJ	104.1 FM	Affiliate
New Orleans	Louisiana	WSLA	1560 AM	Affiliate
Shreveport	Louisiana	KSYB	1300 AM	Affiliate
Springhill	Louisiana	KTKC	1460 AM	Affiliate
Abilene	Texas	KTLT	98.1 FM	Affiliate
Austin	Texas	K248CU	97.5 FM	Affiliate
Big Spring	Texas	KBYG	1400 AM	Affiliate
Big Spring	Texas	K292FE	106.3 FM	Affiliate
Brenham	Texas	KWHI	1280 AM	Affiliate
Carthage	Texas	KGAS	1590 AM	Affiliate
Columbus	Texas	KULM-FM	98.3 FM	Affiliate
Corpus Christi	Texas	KSIX	1230 AM	Affiliate
El Paso	Texas	KQBU	920 AM	Affiliate
Fredericksburg	Texas	KNAF	910 AM	Affiliate
Hempstead	Texas	KTWL	105.3 FM	Affiliate
Henderson	Texas	KWRD	1470 AM	Affiliate
Houston	Texas	KTRH	740 AM	Flagship (night games only)
Houston	Texas	KBME	790 AM	Flagship
Houston	Texas	KEYH	850 AM	Flagship (Spanish games)
Livingston	Texas	KETX	1440 AM	Affiliate
Marshall	Texas	KMHT	1450 AM	Affiliate
Marshall	Texas	KMHT-FM	103.9 FM	Affiliate
Lubbock	Texas	KTTU	950 AM	Affiliate
Lufkin	Texas	KSML	1260 AM	Affiliate
Madisonville	Texas	KMVL	1220 AM	Affiliate
Madisonville	Texas	KMVL-FM	98.9 FM	Affiliate
San Antonio	Texas	KTKR	760 AM	Affiliate
Temple	Texas	KTEM	1400 AM	Affiliate
Victoria	Texas	KVNN	1340 AM	Affiliate
Waco	Texas	KBBW	1010 AM	Affiliate
Waco	Texas	K289BU	105.7 FM	Affiliate

Map of network stations in Texas
Map of network stations in Louisiana
Map of network stations in Arkansas

== See also ==
- List of Houston Astros broadcasters
- Root Sports Southwest
- Texas State Network
