= KYST =

Texas City, Texas; United States
- Broadcast area: Greater Houston
- Frequency: 920 kHz
- Branding: Patriot Talk 920

Programming
- Format: Conservative talk
- Affiliations: Westwood One

Ownership
- Owner: Hispanic Broadcasting, Inc.

History
- First air date: November 1, 1948
- Former call signs: KTLW (1948–1980)

Technical information
- Licensing authority: FCC
- Facility ID: 27298
- Class: B
- Power: 5,000 watts (day); 1,000 watts (night)
- Transmitter coordinates: 29°25′3″N 94°56′12″W

Links
- Public license information: Public file; LMS
- Webcast: Listen live
- Website: PatriotTalk920.com

KYST (920 AM) is a commercial radio station licensed to Texas City, Texas, United States. It is branded as "Patriot Talk 920" and airs a conservative talk format. The station is owned by Matthew Velasquez, through licensee Hispanic Broadcasting, Inc.

The studios and offices are on Southwest Freeway in Houston. The transmitter is on 29th Street North in Texas City.

== History ==
The station signed on the air on November 1, 1948. The original call sign was KTLW. It called itself "92 KTLK." In the 1960s and 1970s, it aired a country music format. News updates were provided by AP Radio News.

In 1980, the call letters were changed to KYST. In 1982, while officially known as KYST, it billed itself as "Beatle Radio Number 9 KBTL" and briefly had a format of all Beatles music. In 1983, the Hispanic Broadcasting Company acquired KYST. The station flipped from English-language programming to Spanish.

From the mid-1980s into the early 1990s, it ran a Tejano music format as "Radio Alegria KYST 920 AM." As music listening shifted to the FM band, and the Tejano format began to fade, KYST switched to a Spanish language full service format including news and talk. It was billed as "La 920".

On January 1, 2024, KYST changed its format from the long running Spanish language news/talk programming to English-language talk radio. It became the fifth commercial AM station in the Houston-Galveston area to broadcast conservative talk, after KTRH 740, KPRC 950, KSEV 700 and KNTH 1070. KYST's conservative talk marks the only attempt at programming of an English language format for the Velasquez family, and a return of English itself to the station, since the family purchased the facility in 1983.

== Programming ==
Michaal Wilson is KYST's lone local personality, hosting both a morning and afternoon drive program. The remainder of the lineup is nationally syndicated conservative talk programs.
