= Michael Berry (radio host) =

Councilman of Houston, Texas and talk show host (born 1970)

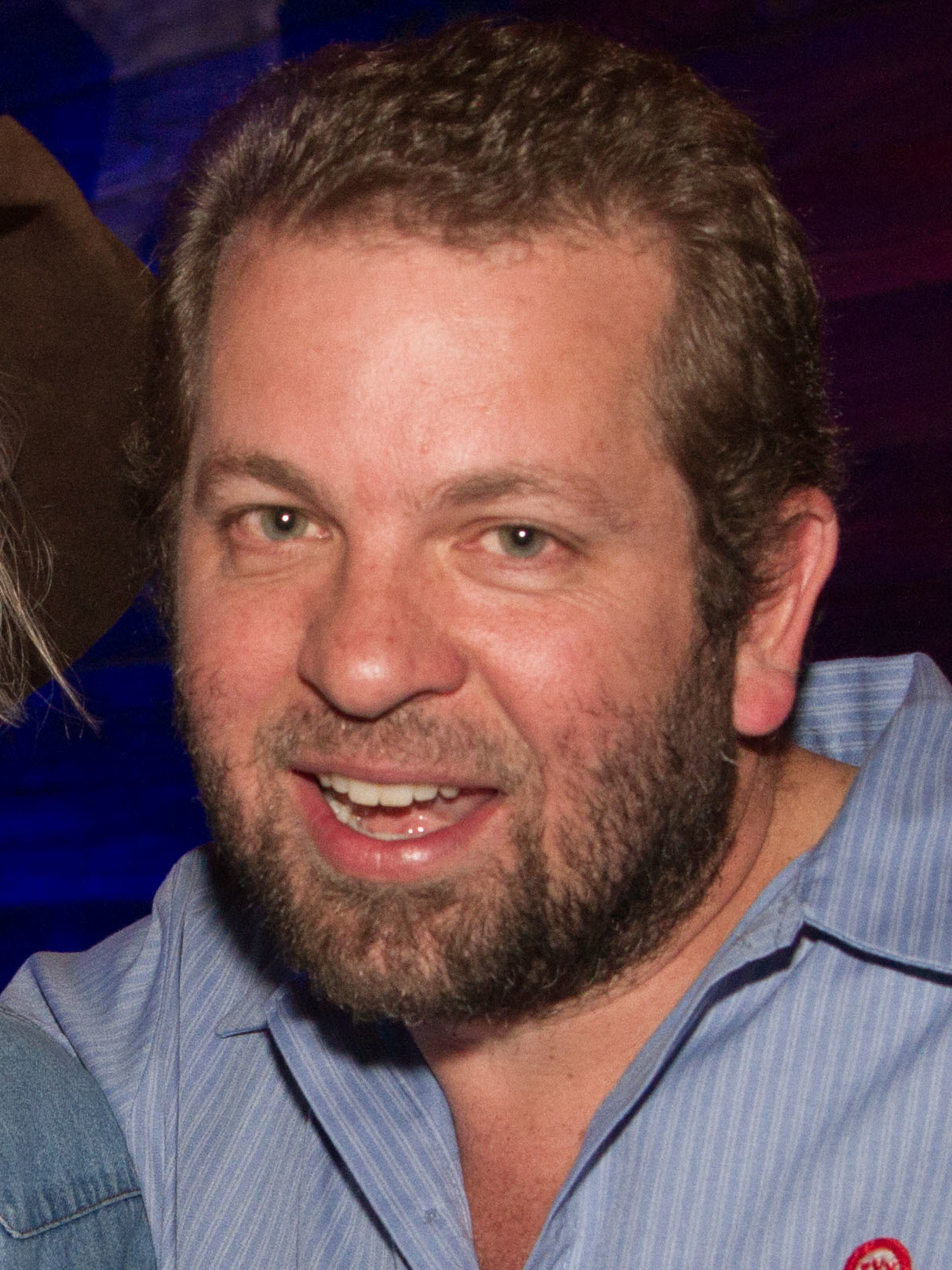
- Berry in 2015

Member of the Houston City Council from the at-large #5 district
- In office January 2, 2004 – January 2, 2008
- Preceded by: Carroll Robinson
- Succeeded by: Jolanda Jones

Member of the Houston City Council from the at-large #4 district
- In office January 2, 2002 – January 2, 2004
- Preceded by: Chris Bell
- Succeeded by: Ronald C. Green

Personal details
- Born: Michael Christian Berry; November 10, 1970 (age 56) Orangefield, Texas, U.S.
- Party: Republican
- Height: 6 ft 0 in (183 cm)
- Spouse: Nandita Venkateswaran Berry
- Children: 2
- Education: University of Houston (BA); University of Texas School of Law (JD); University of Nottingham (ML)
- Occupation: Talk radio host, attorney, real estate developer

Michael Christian Berry (born November 10, 1970) is an American conservative radio talk show host based in Houston, Texas. A former member of the Houston City Council, Berry has worked as an attorney, a real estate developer, and a restaurateur.

== Early life ==
Berry was born and raised in Orange, Texas, the youngest of four sons. His father Norman Berry was a chemical plant maintenance supervisor at DuPont, and his mother Loretta (nee' Sieber) was a nursing home attendant.

A student body president at the University of Houston, Berry graduated magna cum laude from Houston with a B.A. in Political Science, J.D. from the University of Texas School of Law and a M.L. in international commercial law from the University of Nottingham.

== Legal and real estate career ==
Berry began his career as a partner at the law firm Jenkens & Gilchrist. In 1997, Berry became president of residential real estate company Michael Berry Properties, later Brenham Partners.

== Political career ==
Berry was a three-term Houston at-large city council member and also served as Mayor Pro Tem. He was named "Councilman of the Year" by the Houston Police Officers Union. After helping Houston film director and choreographer Shawn Welling with a legal dispute involving the city council, Berry became producer on the next Welling Films production, which won acclaim from notable Houston newspapers the Houston Chronicle and the Houston Press. Berry told the station, "I think that this story is so compelling that if it can generate an initial buzz, then it will take on a life of its own... The beauty of the story is it's a story of redemption."

== Radio career ==
In 2005, Berry began hosting weekend program Michael Berry's Real Estate Review on Houston radio station NewsRadio 740 KTRH. The following year, Berry began hosting a weekday 9 a.m. to 11 a.m. talk show on sister station Talk Radio 950 KPRC that replaced the syndicated Glenn Beck Program.

On April 27, 2007, Berry became operations director for the three Clear Channel Communications AM radio stations in Houston: KTRH, KPRC, and KBME "790 the Sports Animal". Berry remained in that position until 2011. In June 2007, Berry began hosting a 5 p.m. to 8 p.m. show on KTRH in addition to his morning KPRC show. KTRH moved Berry's show to 7 p.m. to 9 p.m. in July 2007 to make room for The Sean Hannity Show and The Chris Baker Show. KPRC dropped Berry's show on July 30, 2007 as part of its revamped "Radio Mojo" format that put Walton and Johnson and Mancow's Morning Madhouse in weekday mornings. Berry returned to his old timeslot after KTRH canceled Baker's show in November 2007. In 2010, KPRC "The 9-5-0 Radio Mojo" brought back Berry in the 2 p.m. to 5 p.m. slot, and KTRH cut Berry's 5 p.m. show back one hour in order to present all three hours of The Mark Levin Show afterwards.

From 2008 to 2010, Berry hosted a weekend show Texas Time that showcased new featured music releases and festivals in Texas.

Clear Channel station in Portland, Oregon, NewsRadio 1190 KEX, began simulcasting Berry's KPRC show live in the 12 to 3 p.m. (PT) slot in April 2011.

In January 2012, KPRC replaced Berry's afternoon show with a show by KTRH morning host Matt Patrick. KTRH put Berry on the 8 a.m. to 11 a.m. slot previously occupied by the last hour of Houston's Morning News and The Glenn Beck Program; KPRC took in Glenn Beck. This marked the end of KEX broadcasting Berry live, as KEX's noon broadcast of Michael Berry became a delayed version of Berry's KTRH morning show. Berry's afternoon show has since expanded to other markets on iHeartMedia (formerly Clear Channel) stations, primarily in the Southeast.

Berry has been a guest host of the nationally syndicated Mark Levin Show and in December 2021, he guest hosted The Clay Travis and Buck Sexton Show.

== Honors, Awards, Distinctions ==
=== Best Radio Host (Talk): Houston Press ===
Berry won the readers' choice award of best talk radio host from the Houston Press in 2010. In the staff's view:

Michael Berry might be too conservative for some, but we like how he has his finger on the pulse of Houston’s hot-button issues. We like to tune in after work to see what he makes of the day’s events, even if we don’t always agree. Often controversial, always compelling, he doesn’t talk over his callers like many of his right-wing talk show brethren; he actually tries to engage his callers, even — or especially — if he doesn’t completely agree with them. He’s a smart guy, and he understands politics and people from all walks of life. It makes him extremely listenable, and — dare we say it? — likable.

=== Top 25 Radio Hosts: Newsmax Media Inc. ===
Berry was considered one of the top 25 radio hosts by Newsmax in October 2006, saying:

He’s not only a popular talk show host but also a city councilman, mayor pro tempore, and a lawyer married to a lawyer. The Houston Chronicle says the Republican pol/talker makes it a “practice to provoke” and is a “love him or hate him” kind of guy. Berry says he wants his show to be a “controversial discussion of issues” where people “discuss openly what they typically think but can’t say.”

=== TALKERS Heavy Hundred ===
Michael Berry has been a long-time, high-ranking member of the TALKERS Heavy Hundred list for many years, including:

- 2025: Ranked #6 on the list.
- 2023: Ranked #7 on the list.
- 2021: Listed in the top ten.
- 2020: Ranked #11.

== Controversy ==
Referring to the Park51 Muslim community center proposed for construction near the Ground Zero site of the September 11, 2001, attacks in New York City, Berry stated on his May 26, 2010, KPRC program that if the center were to be completed, "I hope that someone blows it up". The following day, he addressed his audience, issuing a statement which said in part, "I apologize to you, my listeners, for insulting your intelligence and saying something so stupid. I do not apologize, however, for my opinion that that mosque should not be built."

As Berry was set to receive the "Talk Personality of the Year" award during the 2017 iHeartRadio Music Awards, the Chicago Tribune reported on March 2, 2017 that Berry had a regular feature titled "Chicago Weekend Crime Report" that included snide remarks about Chicago homicide victims, including speculation of which body parts were shot and mockery of victims' names. Nearly two weeks after that article, Berry apologized, stating: "I have to make better decisions with the words I use."

== Personal life ==
Berry has been married to Nandita Venkateswaran "Nandy" Berry since 1993. They first met as students at the University of Houston when the alumni association assigned Michael to train Nandita. They have two sons adopted from Ethiopia. From 2014-2015, Nandita Berry was the 109th Secretary of State of Texas.

The Houston Chronicle reported on February 16, 2012 that Berry had been accused of leaving the scene of an accident in the Montrose section of Houston at approximately 11 p.m. on January 31, 2012. On his February 21 radio show, Berry named KPRC-TV in criticizing news coverage of this incident as inaccurate. On February 23, 2012, the accuser settled the matter in exchange for a payment of two thousand dollars from Berry for damages to his car, without an acknowledgement of guilt by Berry. After prosecutors were unable to contact the alleged victim, they declined to pursue charges in the case.
