= KPRC =

KPRC may refer to:

- KPRC-TV, a television station (PSIP 2/RF 35) licensed to Houston, Texas, United States
- KPRC (AM), a radio station (950 AM) licensed to Houston, Texas, United States
- KPRC-FM, a radio station (100.7 FM) licensed to Salinas, California, United States
- KODA, a radio station (99.1 FM) licensed to Houston, Texas, United States; formerly KPRC-FM from 1946 to 1958
- The ICAO code for Ernest A. Love Field in Prescott, Arizona, United States
