= KSEV =

- Tomball, Texas; United States
- Broadcast area: Greater Houston
- Frequency: 700 kHz

Programming
- Format: Talk; brokered
- Network: Townhall News
- Affiliations: Compass Media Networks; Radio America; Westwood One

Ownership
- Owner: Dan Patrick; (Patrick Broadcasting LP)

History
- First air date: December 1, 1986
- Former call signs: KTBT (1986–1988)
- Call sign meaning: Seven, as in 700 kHz

Technical information
- Licensing authority: FCC
- Facility ID: 9645
- Class: B
- Power: 1,900 watts day; 4 watts night
- Transmitter coordinates: 30°11′34″N 95°35′40″W

Links
- Public license information: Public file; LMS
- Webcast: Listen live
- Website: ksevradio.com

KSEV (700 AM) is a commercial radio station, licensed to Tomball, Texas, and serving Greater Houston. It broadcasts a talk radio format and is owned by Texas Lieutenant Governor Dan Patrick. (Patrick is not related to sports radio and TV host Dan Patrick.) The studios and offices are on Katy Freeway (I-10) in Houston.

AM 700 is a clear-channel frequency reserved for WLW in Cincinnati, a Class A, 50,000-watt station. While KSEV operates with 1,900 watts by day, it must reduce power at night to 4 watts to avoid interference. It uses a directional antenna with a three-tower array. The transmitter is off Farm to Market Road 2978 in The Woodlands, Texas. There are only 13 other stations in the United States that broadcast on 700 kHz.

== Programming ==
On weekdays, KSEV features local hosts in the morning and afternoon drive times, with paid brokered programming in middays and syndicated conservative talk shows heard the rest of the day. After Chris Salcedo’s departure, Craig Collins and Wayne Dolcefino took over the morning show, while Chris X. Blayney hosts afternoons. Syndicated programs include The Brian Kilmeade Show, Guy Benson, The Joe Pags Show and Red Eye Radio. On weekends, KSEV carries programs about money, health, lifestyle, food, cigars, home repair and gardening. Weekend syndicated hosts include Rich Valdes and Joe Concha. Most hours begin with an update from Townhall News.

The station's primary competitors are two well-established talk stations, both owned by iHeartMedia, KTRH and KPRC, as well as Salem Media talk radio outlet KNTH and independently-owned KYST.

== History ==
On December 1, 1986, the station first signed on as KTBT. It was owned by Duncan Broadcasting and aired a middle of the road (MOR) music format. At first, the power was 2,500 watts by day and 1,000 watts at night.

Howard Sellers acquired the station in September 1989. He kept the format as MOR. Sellers sold the station the following month.

In October 1989, the station changed owners again, as Sunbelt Broadcasting bought the station for only $47,164. Sunbelt's president and owner was Dan Patrick, who was already hosting a show on KTBT. Previously, Patrick had served as sports director for KHOU-TV in Houston. Sunbelt changed the call sign to KSEV and switched the format to conservative talk. The station became an affiliate of the NBC Radio Network and also got a boost in power to 25,000 watts in the daytime, and 1,000 watts at night.

Patrick wore several hats as owner, general manager, and morning drive sports talk host in the early years of KSEV. Also in 1989, KSEV acquired the Houston-area rights to run the nationally syndicated Rush Limbaugh Show, while Limbaugh was relatively unknown. (Limbaugh later switched to KTRH.) In April of that year, Los Angeles Kings hockey games were aired; it ended in June 1993. Dallas Stars took over in the fall of that year. By 1990, along with Limbaugh and Patrick, KSEV had a lineup of local hosts which included Roger Gray, Jerry Trupiano, and former Houston Chronicle sportswriter Ed Fowler. Bob Hallmark was the program director and Rod Evans served as the news director.

In 1995, KSEV was acquired by San Antonio-based Clear Channel Communications. The format remained talk and Patrick stayed on as vice president and general manager.

The station changed hands again in 2001, as Clear Channel sold KSEV to Liberman Broadcasting, based in Southern California. Even though Lieberman usually programmed Spanish-language formats, KSEV remained a conservative talk station in English. Patrick remained KSEV's vice president, running the station through a local marketing agreement (LMA). Patrick later bought the station from Lieberman. He no longer hosts a show on KSEV, concentrating on his Lieutenant Governor duties.
