= KBME =

KBME may refer to:

- KBME-TV, a television station (channel 22) licensed to Bismarck, North Dakota, United States
- KBME (AM), a radio station (790 AM) licensed to Houston, Texas, United States
