= KQBT =

Urban contemporary radio station in Houston

- Houston, Texas; United States
- Broadcast area: Greater Houston
- Frequency: 93.7 MHz (HD Radio)
- Branding: 93.7 The Beat

Programming
- Language: English
- Format: Urban contemporary
- Subchannels: HD2: Pride Radio
- Affiliations: Premiere Networks

Ownership
- Owner: iHeartMedia; (iHM Licenses, LLC)
- Sister stations: KBME, KODA, KPRC, KTBZ-FM, KTRH, KXYZ

History
- First air date: October 25, 1963
- Former call signs: KBNO (1963–1971); KRLY (1971–1984); KLTR-FM (1984–1986); KLTR (1986–1993); KKRW (1993–2014)
- Call sign meaning: "Beat"

Technical information
- Licensing authority: FCC
- Facility ID: 9625
- Class: C
- ERP: 100,000 watts
- HAAT: 524 meters (1,719 ft)
- Transmitter coordinates: 29°34′27″N 95°29′37″W

Links
- Public license information: Public file; LMS
- Webcast: Listen live (via iHeartRadio)
- Website: 937thebeathouston.iheart.com

KQBT (93.7 FM) is an urban contemporary radio station in Houston, Texas. It is owned by iHeartMedia. The station's studios are located along the West Loop Freeway in the city's Uptown district, and the transmitter site is near Missouri City, Texas.

KQBT carries Pride Radio on the HD Radio sub-channel.

== History ==
=== Early years ===
The station initially signed on as KBNO by Joel S., Donald J., and James A. Kaufman on October 25, 1963, at 18,460 watts ERP, from an elevation at 457 feet height above average terrain. The station featured "popular music of the time and show tunes". The studios and RCA BTF 5B transmitter were located on the 34th floor of the Gulf Building, and the corner of Main and Rusk Streets in downtown Houston. KBNO received its initial License to Cover on April 7, 1964.

In February 1970, KBNO adopted the "Hit Parade '70" contemporary format. The station was noted in the movie Brewster McCloud, which featured a station advertisement on the side of a passing bus that same year.

In August 1971, the station changed call letters to KRLY and maintained a top 40 format, but took on various format shifts and identities throughout the latter half of the decade, such as album oriented rock "Y-94" in 1977, "Disco 94" in 1979, then "KRLY 94", a top 40/urban hybrid. By mid-1981, the station had rebranded as "Love 94." During its time as “Disco 94,” radio/television personality turned 2018 congressional political candidate Dayna Steele was among its air staffers.

In March 1984, the station switched to adult contemporary as "Lite Rock 93.7" and changed calls to KLTR (adopted on March 20, 1984). The station rebranded to "K-Lite 93.7" in the late 1980s.

=== The Arrow ===
On November 25, 1993, at 2 p.m., the station flipped to Classic Hits, branded as "93.7 The Arrow", and launched with Bob Seger's "Old Time Rock and Roll". The KKRW call letters were adopted on December 20, 1993.

Over the next decade, the station evolved to straightforward classic rock. In the early 2000s, KKRW was home of the "Dean & Rog" morning show until they left in early 2009 (currently at KGLK/KHPT).

In early 2009, the station began airing (in syndication) former KLOL morning hosts "Walton & Johnson", who host a politically-oriented morning show that leans right. The show was dropped from KKRW in December 2012 (they're now at sister station KPRC). Afternoon personality Steve Fixx filled in with a music-heavy show for several months called the "Morning Classic Rock Fixx" until the arrival of veteran St. Louis personality JC Corcoran with "JC and the Morning Showgram" in March 2013.

KKRW enjoyed ratings success for a number of years, both in Arbitron's diary and Portable People Meter ratings measurement systems. KKRW took an initial ratings hit when Dean and Rog left for KGLK, but rebounded to beat the new challenger for roughly a year and a half because of the addition of longtime Houston-based radio shock jocks Walton & Johnson, who helped make KKRW their flagship station.

=== The Beat ===
Ratings remained strong until KGLK, which played a slightly lighter classic rock format (identifying as classic hits), began simulcasting on 106.9 and 107.5 in June 2011. In its last full book with classic rock, KKRW was ranked #17 with a 2.4 share of the market according to Arbitron's Houston market ratings.

On December 31, 2013, at 10 a.m., after playing Thin Lizzy's "The Boys are Back in Town", the station began stunting with music from many genres. At Noon, after playing Journey's "Don't Stop Believin'," KKRW flipped to Urban Contemporary, branded as "93.7 The Beat." The first song on "The Beat" was "Drunk in Love" by Houston native Beyoncé. The move gives Houston a straight-ahead, core-based R&B/Hip-Hop outlet and new competition for KBXX, whose direction focuses on hit-driven R&B/Hip-Hop material, as well as KBXX's sister Urban AC KMJQ, both of which are owned by Radio One, and are usually the two dominant stations in the market. It was the first time in 14 years iHeartMedia (then known as Clear Channel Communications) attempted an urban outlet in Houston, as it once owned KBXX and KMJQ from 1994 to 2000, when both were spun off to Radio One.

On January 15, 2014, KKRW changed call letters to KQBT to match the "Beat" moniker.

== Notable Staff ==
- OG Ron C- Former on-air personality (2014-2020) Host of ChopNotSlopShow
- DJ Mr Rogers- Former on-air DJ (2014-2022)
- DJ Hollygrove- Former on-air personality (2014-2020) Co-Host of ChopNotSlopShow
- DJ Candlestick- Former on-air mixer (2014-2020) Co-host of ChopNotSlopShow
- Kiotti Brown- Syndicated On-air Personality

== HD Radio ==
On September 7, 2017, KQBT-HD2 launched a new urban adult contemporary format as 104.5 Kiss FM, simulcasting on the leased translator 104.5 K283CH (which was previously fed by sister station KTBZ-FM HD2's regional Mexican format). The station primarily competed with KMJQ.

On February 18, 2019, the analog simulcast of Kiss FM ended after iHeartMedia's lease of the translator expired. The station continued to operate on KQBT as Kiss 93.7 HD2. On June 26, 2019, KQBT-HD2 flipped to iHeart's "Pride Radio" format of Top 40/Dance music targeting the LGBTQ community. This marks the second such format to air in Houston, the other being Entercom's "Channel Q" network airing on KKHH-HD2.
