= KTBZ-FM =

- Houston, Texas; United States
- Broadcast area: Greater Houston
- Frequency: 94.5 MHz (HD Radio)
- Branding: 94-5 The Buzz

Programming
- Language: English
- Format: Active rock; alternative rock
- Subchannels: HD2: Sports radio (KBME); HD3: Talk radio (KPRC)
- Affiliations: iHeartRadio; Premiere Networks

Ownership
- Owner: iHeartMedia; (iHM Licenses, LLC)
- Sister stations: KBME; KQBT; KODA; KPRC; KTRH; KXYZ

History
- First air date: October 15, 1960
- Former call signs: KARO (1960–1963); KLEF (1963–1986); KJYY (1986–1988); KLDE (1988–2000); KTBZ (2000–2001)
- Call sign meaning: "The Buzz" (branding)

Technical information
- Licensing authority: FCC
- Facility ID: 18516
- Class: C
- ERP: 100,000 watts
- HAAT: 585 meters (1,919 ft)
- Transmitter coordinates: 29°34′34.8″N 95°30′36.8″W
- Translators: (99.5 MHz) K258DA (Houston); (105.3 MHz) K287BQ (Houston)

Links
- Public license information: Public file; LMS
- Webcast: Listen live (via iHeartRadio)
- Website: thebuzz.iheart.com

KTBZ-FM (94.5 MHz) is a commercial radio station licensed to Houston, Texas. Owned by iHeartMedia, the station serves Greater Houston. KTBZ-FM's studios are located in Uptown Houston, while the station's transmitter is located near Missouri City, Texas; KTBZ-FM has an effective radiated power of 100,000 watts.

KTBZ-FM broadcasts in the HD Radio format, with its HD2 subchannel carrying a simulcast of co-owned KBME "Sportstalk 790", and its HD3 subchannel carrying a simulcast of co-owned KPRC.

== History ==
The station first signed on the air October 15, 1960, as KARO. The station was owned by San Diego–based Multi Casting, Inc. and broadcast at only 7,600 watts. KARO was unable to continue operation and went off the air in August 1961. The license remained active though, and was sold to Apollo Broadcasting in 1963.

Apollo changed the call letters to KLEF, and the station returned to the air on November 1, 1964 with a classical music format. In 1969, the station was acquired by Entertainment Communications, Inc., which later became Entercom.

KLEF was Houston's leading classical outlet for 22 years. The station got a boost to 100,000 watts effective radiated power (ERP), covering much of Southeast Texas. By the mid-1980s, interest in classical music had declined and management decided to go with a more mass-appeal format.

On March 13, 1986, the station became KJYY, "Joy 95", with a soft adult contemporary format. Then in 1988, it became KLDE, branded as "Oldies 94.5". At the time, the station was owned by Entercom. The station was operated under the direction of a variety of program directors, including RC Rogers, Bob Harlow, Dennis Winslow, Ron Parker, and Ed Scarborough. Past general managers include Steve Shepard, Chris McMurray, Chris Wegman, and Caroline Devine.

Bonneville International bought the station in 1997, with AM/FM, Inc. taking over in 1998.

Due to the 2000 merger of Clear Channel Communications (now iHeartMedia) and AM/FM, Inc., and the need to stay within the Federal Communications Commission's station ownership cap, KLDE's intellectual property was sold to Cox Radio, for the 107.5 frequency, which at the time aired an alternative rock format as "The Buzz", KTBZ.

It was announced and understood that KLDE's format would stay intact with the ownership change and frequency move. However, on-air personalities continually announced that "The Buzz" would cease operations at 107.5 on July 18 and began a "Save the Buzz" campaign, sending Buzz listeners looking for information on the station's "impending demise" of the alternative format.

When the actual purpose of the "Save the Buzz" campaign was discovered to be a marketing ploy, an online forum maintained by KTBZ was shut down to attempt to keep the information from spreading as concerned listeners began to post their findings. Regardless, it did not prevent listeners from distributing banners throughout Houston and painting "Save The Buzz" slogans on car windows throughout the City.

A few weeks prior to the pending July 18 switch, KTBZ staged a public rally, at which a representative from parent company Clear Channel Radio came to read a statement. The representative said in response to the overwhelming response of listeners and the general community, The Buzz would be saved due to the public outcry, moving to KLDE's 94.5 FM facility, promoting a much stronger signal for the alternative format, creating the marketing strategy of a "Bigger, Better Buzz".

Just before 8:00 p.m. on July 18, 2000, KTBZ and KLDE each played a pre-recorded lead-in to the station switch. KLDE had their air staff riding in a transporter across the dial to 107.5 FM, while KTBZ led a one-minute countdown as they "faded" off the 107.5 frequency. At exactly 8:00 pm, the stations simultaneously exchanged frequencies; KTBZ's montage led in with "Turn on the Juice!", while KLDE's air staff "crash-landed" on 107.5. Both stations celebrated the move with their own "Switch Parties"; The Buzz presented a free concert starring Stone Temple Pilots that was broadcast live on air from The Aerial Theater in downtown Houston as "94.5 The Buzz", while "Oldies 107.5" marked the transition by playing 48 hours of non-stop music. This officially completed the "trade" in ownership.

On January 11, 2001, KTBZ was modified to KTBZ-FM, as a similarly branded, co-owned sports radio station in Tulsa became KTBZ.

In December 2003, the station's new program director Vince Richards fired the entire on air staff. For weeks, the station had no personalities, with a message between songs saying, "We're building a bigger, better Buzz." In January 2004, the station relaunched with new DJs and harder rock sound.

The current weekday on-air lineup includes The Rod Ryan Show on mornings, Jeremy on middays, Theresa on afternoon drive, and Aly Young at night.

== KTBZ-FM HD subchannels ==
KTBZ-FM began transmitting in the HD Radio hybrid format in January 2006. KTBZ-FM-HD2 has gone through three different format changes: from 2006 to 2009, it was alternative rock "Liquid Buzz" (with a different playlist from the main station). From 2009 to 2015, it was "94-5 The Rock, Houston's Rock Station", playing active rock and classic rock. In 2015, KTBZ-FM-HD2 flipped to Regional Mexican music as "La Mejor", and began simulcasting on FM translator K283CH (104.5 FM). On September 7, 2017, at 9 am, KTBZ-FM HD2 dropped the 104.5 translator, and began retransmitting on two co-owned translators on the 102.5 frequency, K273AL (licensed to Porter) and K273CW (licensed to Houston). 104.5 switched to an urban AC format, branded as "104.5 KISS-FM", and relayed by iHeartMedia sister station KQBT HD-2.

"La Mejor", which was a simulcast of KJOZ, moved to the newly created HD3 channel of KTBZ-FM, while the HD2 channel began airing a simulcast of sports radio-formatted KBME. KTBZ-FM HD3 was being used to feed Centro Cristiano de Vida Eterna's FM translator 105.3 K287BQ. However, the translator has been taken silent and has an application to move its transmission site to a location in southwest Houston, due to several complaints filed by co-channel KTWL owner Roy E. Henderson, and numerous citizens within the protected contour of the full power facility. This forced the FCC to require Centro Cristiano de Vida Eterna to take the translator off the air until the interference was eliminated.

As of October 18, 2018, an Informal Objection was filed with the FCC by James B. Davis, of Cypress, Texas, regarding the proposed move of K287BQ to the new location. Davis' claim is that K287BQ would still interfere with the KTWL protected contour at the new site, and asks for the Commission to require the translator to move off of channel 287 (105.3 MHz) entirely. As there is no open channel/frequency available in the immediate Houston area for the translator to move to without causing interference to another established licensed facility, a frequency change would likely prove difficult for the owners.

Centro Cristiano de Vida Eterna is facing similar interference complaints against co-owned translator 103.5 K278CR, also licensed in Houston, due to interference issues with low powered facility KCYB-LP, licensed to Cypress, and an Informal Objection has also been filed by Davis to keep the group from purchasing a full powered facility west of Houston, licensed as KJJB in Eagle Lake, on the grounds that the facility's broadcasting activities in question have existed since licensed.

KTBZ-FM-HD3 has since flipped to a simulcast of co-owned talk radio station KPRC.

== Awards ==
In 2007, the station was nominated for the top 25 markets "Alternative Station of the Year" award by Radio & Records magazine. Other nominees included WBCN in Boston; KROQ-FM in Los Angeles; KITS, in San Francisco; KNDD in Seattle; and WWDC in Washington, D.C.
