= KKHT-FM =

- Lumberton, Texas; United States
- Broadcast area: Greater Houston; Golden Triangle
- Frequency: 100.7 MHz
- Branding: 100.7 The Word

Programming
- Language: English
- Format: Christian radio
- Affiliations: Salem Radio Network

Ownership
- Owner: Salem Media Group; (Salem Media of Illinois, LLC)
- Sister stations: KNTH

History
- First air date: December 1, 1987
- Former call signs: KJAS (1987–1996); KRTX (1996–1997); KRTX-FM (1997; 1998-2002); KOVE-FM (1997–1998); KLAT-FM (2002); KOBT (2002–2004)
- Former frequencies: 100.9 MHz (1988-?)
- Call sign meaning: Houston

Technical information
- Licensing authority: FCC
- Facility ID: 57801
- Class: C
- ERP: 100,000 watts
- HAAT: 595 meters (1,952 ft)
- Transmitter coordinates: 30°3′5″N 94°31′37″W

Links
- Public license information: Public file; LMS
- Webcast: Listen live
- Website: kkht.com

KKHT-FM (100.7 FM, "100.7 The Word") is a commercial radio station licensed to Lumberton, Texas, United States, serving Greater Houston as well as the Golden Triangle. It is owned by Salem Media of Illinois, LLC, a subsidiary of the Salem Media Group, and it airs a Christian radio format. Studios and offices are in the Sharpstown district in Southwest Houston.

KKHT-FM has an effective radiated power (ERP) of 100,000 watts, the highest permitted for non-grandfathered FM stations in the U.S. The transmitter is off U.S. Route 90 in Devers, Texas. With a height above average terrain (HAAT) of 595 m (1,952 ft) and a tower location about halfway between Houston and Beaumont, KKHT-FM is heard in both radio markets.

== History ==
On December 1, 1987, the station signed on the air at 100.9 MHz, as a Class A facility. The original call sign was KJAS, representing Jasper, Texas, its original city of license. The station had a country music format and was owned by Jasper County Broadcasting. The power was only 5,100 watts, a fraction of its current output.

In 1996, the station was sold to Tichenor Broadcasting for $3.5 million. Tichenor specialized in formats targeting Hispanic listeners. The station also got permission from the Federal Communications Commission (FCC) to move down the dial to 100.7 MHz and greatly increase power to 100,000 watts. The call letters switched to KRTX and the city of license became Winnie, Texas. Tichenor gave the newly-powerful station a Regional Mexican format, aimed at Spanish-speaking listeners in and around Houston, one of America's largest Latino media markets. Tichenor was later acquired by Univision Communications.

In 2004, this station was traded from Univision to the Salem Media Group in a deal involving six other stations in five U.S. cities. (See the WPPN page for details.) At the time of sale, 100.7 played Spanish-language contemporary hits as KOBT "Orbita 100-7". Once Salem acquired KOBT, it switched the station to Christian talk and teaching, using the moniker "The Word." Co-owned 1070 KNTH had previously carried the Christian format and was called "The Word." With the FM station now known as "100.7 The Word," Salem launched a new format on AM 1070. KNTH flipped to a conservative talk format as "AM 1070 KNTH", standing for News Talk Houston.
