= Bruce Nelson Stratton =

Bruce Nelson Stratton (May 15, 1943 – February 25, 2018) was an American radio personality. Known as "Dr. Bruce", Stratton began his career in the 1960s and 1970s where he served as on-air personality and programmer for such legendary Country station as WPLO, Atlanta; WMIL, Milwaukee; KENR, Houston; WUBE, Cincinnati; and KNUZ, Houston.

Early in the 1960s. Stratton worked at WXRA in Woodbridge, Virginia, the first FM country station in the USA. Stratton was named Gavin Music Director of the Year in 1974 and scored 50-plus record company awards, helping break the careers of Mickey Gilley, Freddie Fender, Johnny Lee, and Gene Watson.

A sometime recording artist he charted nationally in 1973 with "Shake Em Up and let Em Roll" on Royal American and was the opening act at Gilley's for Mickey Gilley and Johnny Lee, where he originated the first live broadcast over KENR in Houston from Gilley's (The Saturday Night Special) which later evolved into the syndicated "Live at Gilley's during the Urban Cowboy heyday.

He was station manager of Corpus Christi's KFTX "Real Country" radio.

== Legacy ==
In 2005 Governor Rick Perry and the state of Texas recognized Stratton with a Senate resolution noting his contribution to country music in the Lone Star State.

Stratton was inducted into the Country Music Association Hall of Fame in 1999, Country Music Radio Hall of Fame in 2004, and the Texas Radio Hall of Fame in 2009.

== Death ==
Stratton died on February 25, 2018, in Corpus Christi, Texas.
