= Adrian Chavarria =

American sports radio personality

Adrian Chavarria (born June 30, 1971) is an American broadcaster, known as the Spanish broadcaster for the National Basketball Association team, Houston Rockets.

Chavarria and his family moved between his birthplace (Los Angeles) and the ancestral home (Costa Rica) during his youth. He was in Costa Rica 1974–1980 and 1985–1990. After graduating high school in Costa Rica in 1989, Chavarria moved (by himself) to Houston, to further his education and follow his dream to become a broadcaster. He received his degree in radio/television from the University of Houston in 1996.

Chavarria's experience in broadcasting began as an intern with Telemundo in 1993. For three years he worked for Fox Sports Americas, and later Fox Sports World en Espanol, as a college basketball analyst, as well as a reporter for various sporting events.

Chavarria began his career with the Houston Rockets in the 1995–96 basketball season, as a color commentator. He was promoted to play-by-play announcer shortly thereafter in the 1996–1997 season.

Chavarria broadcast his 2268th NBA regular-season game for the Rockets on April 13, 2022, when they faced the Denver Nuggets. He has also broadcast 154 playoff games and 184 pre-season games.

Chavarria has also broadcast games in Spanish for such teams as The Dallas Cowboys, Dallas Mavericks, Chicago Bears and Houston Astros.

Chavarria also hosted "Contacto con los Astros", a monthly television show that aired on FSN Houston from 2006 to 2007. In addition, Chavarria served as the English radio analyst and studio host for the Houston Comets of the WNBA in 2006. Chavarria was also one of the hosts of "Voces del Deporte" a daily local sports show that aired on ESPN Deportes Radio Houston from October 2010 to August 2011.
