= KBYG =

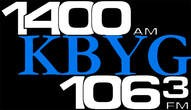

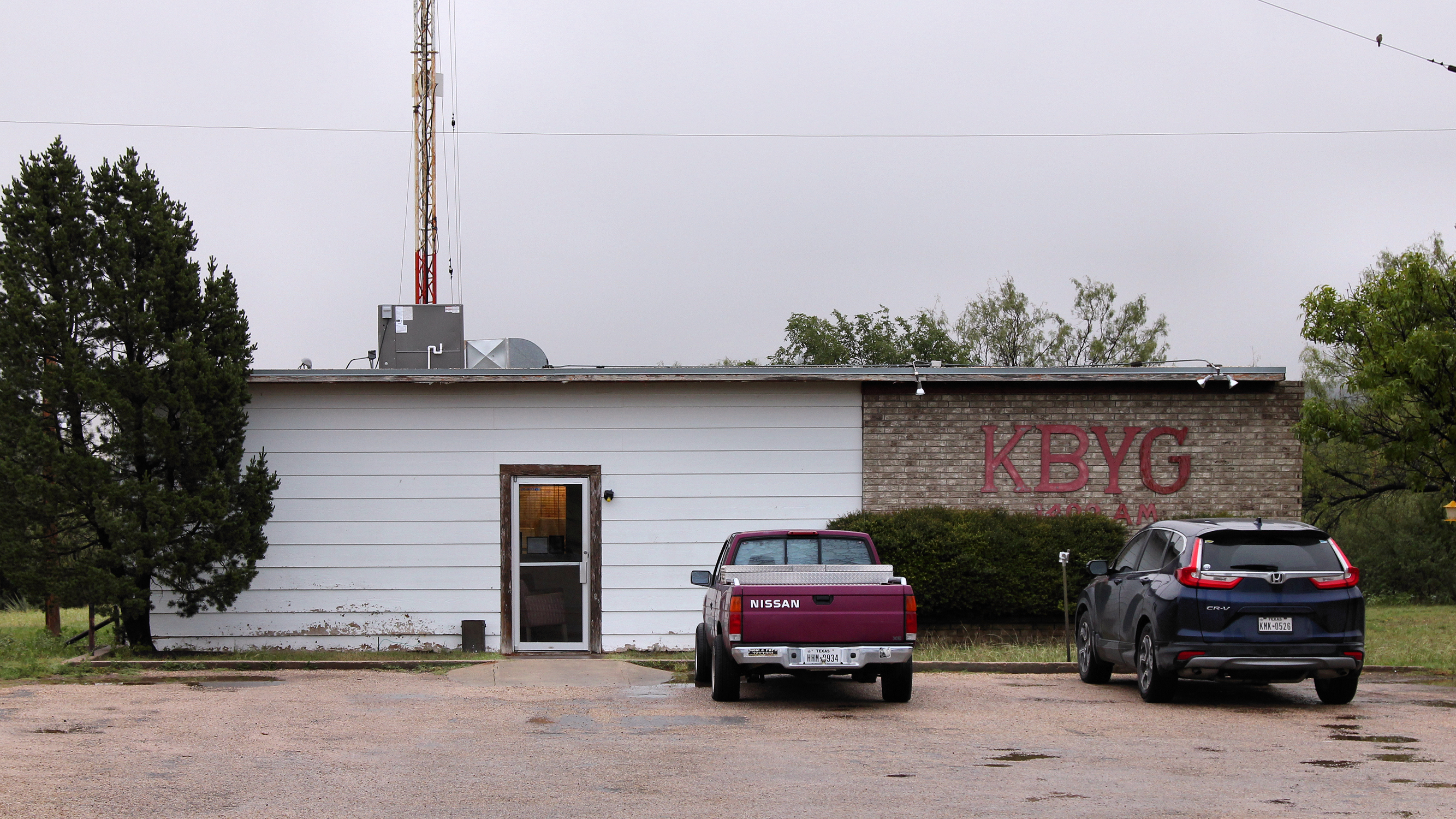
- KBYG Radio Original Studio
- Big Spring, Texas; United States
- Broadcast area: Big Spring-Snyder
- Frequency: 1400 kHz
- Branding: KBYG 106.3

Programming
- Format: Classic hits

Ownership
- Owner: Big Spring Texas Media, LLC
- Sister stations: KXCS

History
- First air date: 1949

Technical information
- Licensing authority: FCC
- Facility ID: 17590
- Class: C
- Power: 1,000 watts unlimited
- Transmitter coordinates: 32°13′22″N 101°28′35″W
- Translator: 106.3 K292FE (Big Spring)

Links
- Public license information: Public file; LMS
- Webcast: Listen live
- Website: kbygradio.com

KBYG (1400 AM, "Big 1400 AM") is a radio station broadcasting a classic hits music format. Licensed to Big Spring, in the U.S. state of Texas, the station serves the Big Spring-Snyder area. The station is currently owned by Weeks Broadcasting, Inc.

== History ==
KBYG began operation in 1948 as a 100–watt full-time operation. It increased to 1,000 watts days in 1964 and 1,000 watts nights in 1984. It was owned by the Grady Maples/RB McAlister interests in the late fifties, the John Hicks (father of Tom Hicks and Steven Hicks) interests in the sixties and seventies, Dick Fields interests in the eighties, and Drew Ballard in the nineties and 2000s.

KBYG is repeated on FM translator station K292FE, Big Spring, Texas.

Dick Fields was the owner of KBYG in the 1980s. Dick Oppenheimer was the owner of crosstown KHEM/KWKI during the same period.

The station was owned by Weeks Broadcasting, Inc., and is now owned and operated under the name Big Spring Texas Media LLC, following the passing of longtime owner John Weeks in 2022. Weeks had served as KBYG’s general manager and longtime local sports broadcaster for Howard College and the Big Spring Steers, marking him as a pillar of the Big Spring community until his death. The station continues to broadcast local sports and serves as a mouthpiece for community news, events, and public service, maintaining its longstanding role as a voice for the people of Big Spring and surrounding areas.

On-Air Legacy: Smokin’ Joe Murphy continues broadcasting from KBYG’s original studio, making him the longest-running on-air voice in Howard County and a beloved local fixture
