= KLAT =

Radio station in Houston

- Houston, Texas; United States
- Broadcast area: Greater Houston
- Frequency: 1010 kHz
- Branding: 10-10 AM

Programming
- Language: Spanish
- Format: Adult contemporary and regional Mexican

Ownership
- Owner: Latino Media Network; (Latino Media Network, LLC)

History
- First air date: July 31, 1961
- Former call signs: KODA (1961–1979)
- Call sign meaning: Former "La Tremenda" branding

Technical information
- Licensing authority: FCC
- Facility ID: 67063
- Class: B
- Power: 5,000 watts (day); 3,000 watts (night)
- Transmitter coordinates: 29°53′47.8″N 95°17′25.8″W

Links
- Public license information: Public file; LMS

KLAT (1010 AM) is a commercial radio station licensed to Houston, Texas, United States, and serving much of Greater Houston. Owned by Latino Media Network, it airs a Spanish-language adult contemporary and Regional Mexican format.

KLAT's transmitter site is on West Little York Road in northwest Houston.

== History ==
=== Early years as KODA ===
On July 31, 1961, the station signed on as KODA. It was put on the air by Paul Taft of the Taft Broadcasting Company (no relation to Taft Broadcasting of Cincinnati, Ohio). Taft already owned an FM station, KODA-FM, airing a beautiful music format. But few people had FM radios in those days, so an AM station was added to make the format available to more Houston residents. KODA was a daytimer during its early years, so it was required to go off the air between sunset and sunrise, while KODA-FM broadcast around the clock.

At first, KODA and KODA-FM simulcast the same beautiful music, competing with ABC-owned KXYZ, which also played easy listening music. But beginning in 1967, the Federal Communications Commission (FCC) banned AM-FM combos in most cities from simulcasting around the clock, so most of the day, KODA began airing a slightly different format, adding middle of the road vocals to the mostly instrumental playlist.

Even though KXYZ was owned by ABC, that station stopped carrying ABC newscasts; they could only be heard on KWBA, based in nearby Baytown, Texas. This allowed the AM version of KODA to begin airing ABC News each hour.

=== "La Tremenda" ===
In 1978, Westinghouse Broadcasting (Group W) purchased KODA-AM-FM from Taft and, the following year, re-sold the AM station. The call sign changed to KLAT in 1979, as the format flipped to popular Spanish-language Regional Mexican music, branded as "La Tremenda". The name La Tremenda 1010 (which translates to "The Tremendous 1010") was a slogan created by the station's new owners, Marcos Rodriguez, Sr. and his son, Marcos A. Rodriguez, operating as the Spanish Broadcasting Corporation.

In late 1979, a fire caused the Harris MW-5 transmitter to melt down. The MW-5 used a step up transformer to raise the three phase input power (at 240 volts) to 17,000 volts. The primary wiring had been bundled closely to the secondary wiring and tightly lashed together. When an insulation breakdown allowed the input wiring to arc, the high temperatures allowed the secondary wires to short to the inputs. This caused extremely high circulating currents and a meltdown of the transformer frame, made of metal castings and laminations.

In 1984, KLAT obtained FCC authorization for round-the-clock operation, giving KLAT Class B status. To add nighttime broadcasts, a seventh tower was added to the array. This was used with five of the existing day towers to make a new parallelogram shaped system. KLAT began night operation at 1,000 watts. This properly protected other stations on AM 1010 as required by FCC rules, but the nighttime signal did not cover all of Houston. This particular authorization was allowed under a waiver for minority-owned stations. Later on, the station received special authority from the FCC to mitigate interference at night from foreign stations (as many south Florida stations get a break from Cuban interference such as WAXY in South Miami). This special temporary authority (STA) allowed the station to operate at 5,000 watts at night using all seven towers. This improved coverage but did not give KLAT 100% nighttime coverage of Houston.

In 1995 the station built a second tower site in Northwest Houston, using six towers and 3,600 watts for nighttime operation. The lowered power did not cover quite as large an area as the former setup. But because of the transmitter's better location, it covered more of the Houston radio market. The project used several consultants, ending with duTreil, Lundin and Rackley.

=== Expanded Band assignment ===
On March 17, 1997, the FCC announced that eighty-eight stations had been given permission to move to newly available "Expanded Band" transmitting frequencies, ranging from 1610 to 1700 kHz, with KLAT authorized to move from 1010 to 1690 kHz. However, the station never procured the construction permit needed to implement the authorization, so the expanded band station was never built.

=== Spanish-language talk and sports ===
In 2003, KLAT was bought by Univision, primarily a Spanish-language TV network that was also getting into radio ownership. It became the flagship station of the Major League Baseball's Houston Astros. In 2012, KLAT became part of the Univision America talk radio network. That continued until July 17, 2015, when the talk format was dropped and replaced by a Spanish Christian contemporary format known as "Amor Celestial" which translates to "Heavenly Love".

In March 2016, KLAT began to air Houston Dynamo soccer games, as a first step into sports radio. On December 20, 2016, Univision announced that KLAT would be one of the charter affiliates of Univision Deportes Radio, a Spanish-language sports network launched in April 2017. Astros baseball broadcasts refurned for the 2021 season.

=== Latino Media Network sale ===
On June 3, 2022, Univision announced it would sell a package of 18 radio stations across 10 of its markets, primarily AM outlets in large cities (including KLAT) and entire clusters in smaller markets such as McAllen, Texas, and Fresno, California, for $60 million to a new company known as Latino Media Network (LMN); Univision proposed to handle operations for a year under agreement before turning over operational control to LMN in the fourth quarter of 2023. The sale was consummated on December 30, 2022.

Sometime in late 2024, KLAT switched to a Spanish AC/Regional Mexican format.
