= KXYZ =

- Houston, Texas; United States
- Broadcast area: Greater Houston
- Frequency: 1320 kHz
- Branding: Houston's BIN 1320

Programming
- Language: English
- Format: All-news radio
- Network: Black Information Network

Ownership
- Owner: iHeartMedia, Inc.; (iHM Licenses, LLC)
- Sister stations: KBME, KODA, KPRC, KQBT, KTBZ-FM, KTRH

History
- First air date: August 24, 1926
- Former call signs: KTUE (1926–1930)
- Former frequencies: 1140 (1926–1927); 1410 (1927–1928); 1420 (1928–1932); 1440 (1932–1941); 1470 (1941)

Technical information
- Licensing authority: FCC
- Facility ID: 95
- Class: B
- Power: 8,400 watts (day); 2,800 watts (night)
- Transmitter coordinates: 29°54′56.8″N 95°27′42.8″W

Links
- Public license information: Public file; LMS
- Webcast: Listen live (via iHeartRadio)
- Website: houston.binnews.com

KXYZ (1320 AM) is a radio station in the United States. Licensed to Houston, Texas, United States and serving Greater Houston, it is owned by iHeartMedia and broadcasts an all-news radio format as an affiliate of iHeartMedia's Black Information Network.

The station first signed on in 1926 as KTUE before taking on its current call sign KXYZ in 1930. In 1938, KXYZ became the first radio station in the Southern U.S. with a 24-hour broadcast schedule. KXYZ had been an affiliate of the NBC Blue Network and its successor ABC Radio from 1937 to 1979. Throughout its history, KXYZ has been locally owned at times, with some national owners such as ABC from 1968 to 1979 and Infinity Broadcasting from 1983 to 1998. Under ABC ownership, KXYZ was usually an MOR station and enjoyed significant success. Its news department won recognition from the American Bar Association and Associated Press in 1971. In spring 1976, the station had a top-ten Arbitron ranking in Houston. From 1976 to 1978, KXYZ was the radio home of Houston Rockets basketball.

After some short-lived disco and Christian formats, KXYZ had a Spanish news, talk, and music format from 1981 to 2005. As a Spanish station, KXYZ had a small but devoted listener following and attraacted local news coverage for benefit concerts relating to the 1985 Mexico City earthquake and 1986 San Salvador earthquake. KXYZ also resumed carrying Houston Rockets games, this time in Spanish, from 1989 to 1995. Multicultural Broadcasting purchased KXYZ in 2003, leading to two format changes, first to business and finance in 2005, then a multilingual Chinese, Hindi, and Vietnamese format in 2008. iHeartMedia then purchased KXYZ in 2021 and, with the iHeartMedia purchase, the station changed its programming to the Black Information Network format of all-news radio.

== History as KTUE (1926–1930) ==
KXYZ was first licensed on August 24, 1926, with call sign KTUE. Owned by Uhalt Electric, KTUE broadcast with five watts, starting with a frequency of 1140 kilocycles, then 1410 kc starting June 1, 1927; and 1420 starting December 21, 1928. In its early years, KTUE usually played music from 5:30 to 6:15 p.m. By 1928, it began broadcasting weekdays at 2 to 3 p.m. and Saturday nights.

Beginning in December 1929, KTUE broadcast with 100 watts and an expanded lineup of programming featuring local musicians.

KTUE moved into multiple different studios across Houston, such as the Chronicle Building in 1929 and Texas State Hotel from 1929 to 1935.

Following authorization from the Federal Radio Commission (FRC), KTUE shut down on July 31, 1930.

== History as KXYZ (1930–present) ==
=== Early history (1930–1948) ===
On August 8, 1930, the Harris County Broadcasting Company obtained the KTUE broadcast license from Uhalt, and the Federal Radio Commission changed KTUE's call sign to KXYZ. Broadcasting from the Texas State Hotel, KXYZ first signed on with test programs on October 3, 1930.

In 1932, KXYZ absorbed another station, KTLC, and moved to 1440 kHz at 250 watts. Station power increased to 500, then 1,000 watts, in 1935.

Beginning August 1, 1937, KXYZ became an affiliate of the NBC Blue Network.

In 1938, KXYZ became the first radio station in the Southern U.S. to broadcast 24 hours a day.

With the enactment of the North American Regional Broadcasting Agreement (NARBA), the station relocated to 1470 kHz in 1941. When KTRH moved to 740 kHz, KXYZ took over the former KTRH transmission site and began broadcasting with 5,000 watts on 1320 on December 16, 1942.

KXYZ had a contemporary hits and entertainment format in the 1940s and 1950s. Beginning June 15, 1945, KXYZ transitioned its network affiliation, as the Blue Network changed to ABC Radio. In 1947, KXYZ DJ Bob Blase was part of a feature article in The Billboard for regularly playing modern jazz on his show.

=== Ownership and format changes (1948–1968) ===
On June 17, 1948, the Federal Communications Commission approved the purchase of Harris County Broadcasting Company by Shamrock Broadcasting Company, owned by Glenn H. McCarthy, for $75,000. Under Shamrock ownership, KXYZ was part of the ABC Radio network and featured Frederick Ziv shows such as The Cisco Kid.

The Houston Broadcasting Corporation bought KXYZ AM from Shamrock on April 1, 1957.

Around July 1960, KXYZ began focusing its music programming on big band.

The KXYZ AM and FM stations were sold by the Houston Broadcasting Corporation to KXYZ Inc., a company owned by the Kamin family, in June 1961 for a combined $1 million. KXYZ changed to a beautiful music format in July 1961.

=== ABC ownership (1968–1979) ===
ABC bought KXYZ AM and FM in 1968; this purchase helped ABC reach its maximum level of 14 owned radio stations. KXYZ became part of ABC's American Entertainment Network on July 31 that year.

KXYZ's news department won national honors in 1971, an Associated Press Broadcasters honorable mention for editorials about Houston's regulations on handing out flyers and American Bar Association Certificate of Merit for programs about the United States Bill of Rights. In July 1974, the format changed to middle of the road (MOR) music as "13K", aimed towards listeners aged 25 to 34.

The spring 1976 Arbitron ratings ranked KXYZ ninth in Houston, finding about 15,600 listeners every 15 minutes. From 1976 to 1978, KXYZ was the radio home for Houston Rockets basketball games. In October 1978, the station adopted a disco format as "Studio 13".

=== Shifts to religious and Spanish formats (1979–1983) ===
ABC sold KXYZ AM in 1979 to Slater Broadcasting Company for $1.8 million effective March 14, in order to buy an AM station in a different market. Slater immediately changed KXYZ's format from disco to Christian upon obtaining the station. The Houston Chronicle observed in June 1979 about KXYZ's new format: "About half the air time at KXYZ is devoted to Christian music and the other half is devoted to speakers and preachers."

On December 1, 1981, KXYZ changed to a Spanish language format, becoming the fifth Houston-area station to broadcast in that language. Branded "Radio 13", KXYZ had a format listed as "contemporary Spanish music" by the Houston Chronicle on December 6, 1981.

In the Arbitron ratings for the first quarter of 1982 (January 7 to March 17), KXYZ had a 2.9 rating, 14th place in the Houston ratings. But in the second quarter (March 18 to June 9), KXYZ's ratings declined to 20th at 1.3. There was slight improvement in the first quarter of 1983, with KXYZ ranking 15th at 2.6.

=== Infinity/CBS ownership (1983–1998) ===
On April 21, 1983, Slater Broadcasting sold KXYZ to 13 Radio Corporation, a subsidiary of Infinity Broadcasting, for $1.5 million.

KXYZ attracted local attention in early 1984 for Incest: The Ultimate Crime, a 10-hour special series broadcast from 10 p.m. to midnight from January 23 to 27. Partially inspired by the made-for-TV movie Something About Amelia, the series featured interview guests such as a child psychiatrist, Catholic priest, and local prosecutors. However, KXYZ had only a 0.8 share in the Arbitron first quarter 1984 ratings (January 5 to March 28) for Houston. For the third quarter (June 21 to September 12), KXYZ had a 1.3 share.

Despite the low ratings, KXYZ did earn local honors for 1984, with two advertising awards from the Houston Association of Radio Broadcasters. KXYZ also brought Spanish-language pop stars to Houston, for instance interviewing the boy band Menudo in 1984, or sponsoring a free José José concert at the Sam Houston Coliseum on Cinco de Mayo 1985. In October 1985, KXYZ sponsored a benefit concert that raised nearly $125,000 towards relief efforts for the Mexico City earthquake; the concert included such performers at Little Joe y la Familia and René y René.

Beginning on August 8, 1986, KXYZ began broadcasting Houston Astros baseball games in Spanish.

Following the 1986 San Salvador earthquake, KXYZ held special 24-hour broadcasts from El Salvador's consulate in Houston. These broadcasts helped raise nearly $100,000 in donations to the consulate.

From 1989 to 1995, KXYZ was the Spanish radio home for Houston Rockets basketball games, after which Rockets Spanish broadcasts moved to KLAT. KXYZ previously was the English-language flagship for the Rockets from 1976 to 1978. Infinity merged with CBS in 1997, with the Infinity name retained for CBS' radio division.

=== Recent history (1998–present) ===
On July 28, 1998, Radio Unica bought KXYZ from Infinity/CBS for $160,000; KXYZ began broadcasting the Radio Unica network with news, talk, and music in Spanish. Among Unica's stations in 1998, KXYZ represented the sixth largest media market in Houston/Galveston.

In October 2003, Multicultural Broadcasting purchased KXYZ and other stations from Radio Unica.

On February 1, 2005, KXYZ began broadcasting business and financial programming during daytime hours, branded BizRadio1320.

In February 2008, KXYZ's business programming moved to KTEK after the BizRadio Network bought KTEK from Salem Communications. After BizRadio's move, KXYZ changed to a multilingual brokered time format with programming in Chinese, Hindi, and Vietnamese, along with English-language broadcasts from Chinese Radio International.

In March 2021, iHeartMedia closed a purchase of KXYZ from Multicultural Broadcasting for $1.4 million and changed KXYZ's programming to its Black Information Network, a news network targeted to African American listeners.

== Technical information ==
From a directional antenna in north Houston, KXYZ broadcasts with 8.4 kilowatts of daytime power and 2.8 kilowatts at night. KXYZ's studios are located at Uptown Houston, in the iHeart Houston building near Interstate 610.
