= KBBW =

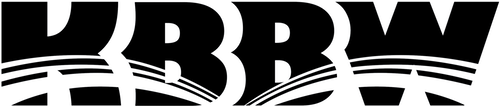
- Waco, Texas; United States
- Broadcast area: Waco-Austin-Round Rock-Killeen-Temple, Texas
- Frequency: 1010 kHz
- Branding: KBBW AM 1010

Programming
- Format: Christian talk and teaching
- Affiliations: Salem Radio Network

Ownership
- Owner: American Broadcasting of Texas

History
- First air date: April 1953
- Former call signs: KMLW (1953-61), KAWA (1961-76), KKIK (1976-82)

Technical information
- Licensing authority: FCC
- Facility ID: 1322
- Class: B
- Power: 10,000 watts (day); 2,500 watts (night)
- Transmitter coordinates: 31°34′7″N 97°0′2″W (day); 31°30′7″N 96°57′54″W (night)
- Translator: See § Translators

Links
- Public license information: Public file; LMS
- Website: https://kbbw.com

KBBW (1010 kHz) is a commercial AM radio station in Waco, Texas. It is owned by American Broadcasting of Texas and airs a Christian talk and teaching radio format. KBBW is powered at 10,000 watts by day. But because 1010 AM is a Canadian clear channel frequency, KBBW must reduce power at night to 2,500 watts to avoid interference.

In addition to its AM signal, KBBW is relayed by three FM translators, K290CV 105.9 MHz Waco, K267CA 101.3 MHz Temple/Killeen, and K262DG 100.3 MHz in Georgetown/Round Rock.

== Programming ==
KBBW is a brokered time station. National and local religious leaders buy blocks of time on the station and may use their shows to appeal for donations to their ministries. National hosts include David Jeremiah, Jim Daly, Chuck Swindoll, Joyce Meyer, Charles Stanley, J. Vernon McGee, Greg Laurie, Adrian Rogers, Steve Arterburn, Jim Dobson and Billy Graham. Some programming is supplied by the Salem Radio Network, including a conservative political talk show hosted by attorney Jay Sekulow.

== History ==
In April 1953, the station signed on the air as KMLW in Marlin, Texas. Its call sign indicated that it served both MarLin and Waco, the larger city nearby. It was only powered at 250 watts and was a daytimer, required to sign-off at night to avoid interfering with other, more powerful stations on 1010 AM. It was owned by KMLW, Inc. and had studios on the Marlin-Waco Highway.

The station changed call letters to KAWA on August 1, 1961. In 1962, it was authorized a dual-city ID of Waco-Marlin. By the early 70s, KAWA was carrying a Country format.

On January 1, 1976, the station's call letters were changed to KKIK and the station shifted to a Progressive Country format. By 1978, the station had moved back to mainstream country. By the 1970s, it had gotten Federal Communications Commission permission to move its city of license to Waco. It got a boost in power to 10,000 watts, but was still a daytime-only station. It carried news from Associated Press Radio.

By the early 80s, KKIK was struggling in the ratings and had added blocks of Spanish language programming. In 1982, KKIK moved to a Christian music format, and the letters were changed to KBBW in September 1982. The station was acquired by American Broadcasting of Texas in 1986. American Broadcasting switched the format to Christian talk and teaching, now broadcasting 24 hours a day.

== Translators ==
Broadcast translators for KBBW
Call sign	Frequency	City of license	FID	ERP (W)	HAAT	Class	Transmitter coordinates	FCC info
K262DG	100.3 FM	Georgetown, Texas	202369	57	60 m (197 ft)	D	30°35′30″N 97°40′44″W	LMS
K267CA	101.3 FM	Temple, Texas	149276	225	150 m (492 ft)	D	31°5′38.40″N 97°34′51″W	LMS
K290CV	105.9 FM	Waco, Texas	147263	250	131 m (430 ft)	D	31°30′32.70″N 97°10′3.10″W	LMS
