= Robert Ford (sportscaster) =

American sportscaster

Robert Ford is an American sportscaster who is the play-by-play commentator for Houston Astros radio broadcasts.

== Broadcast career ==
Before moving up to the booth, Ford hosted the Astros' pregame and postgame radio shows. He performed the same role with the Kansas City Royals before coming to Houston. He joined the Royals in 2009. He previously was a baseball play-by-play announcer for the Binghamton Mets, Yakima Bears, and Kalamazoo Kings. Outside baseball, he called Binghamton Bearcats women's and select men's basketball games. He also called select high school football and basketball games for WCDO in New York. In 2003 and 2004, Ford was named Frontier League Broadcaster of the Year.

Ford became the Astros radio play-by-play broadcaster in 2013, working alongside Steve Sparks. They replaced Dave Raymond and Brett Dolan. Ford was named the Texas Broadcaster of the Year in 2022 by the National Sports Media Association.

== Personal life ==
Ford grew up in The Bronx and attended The Bronx High School of Science before attending the Newhouse School of Public Communications at Syracuse University, graduating with a bachelor's degree in broadcasting journalism in 2001. He is the son of music journalist and songwriter Robert Ford Jr.

Ford has a daughter.

While working in Kansas City, Ford met fellow African American play-by-play broadcaster Dave Sims, who became a friend and mentor.

== See also ==
- List of current Major League Baseball broadcasters
- Houston Astros Radio Network
