= KPRC (AM) =

- Houston, Texas; United States
- Broadcast area: Greater Houston
- Frequency: 950 kHz
- Branding: KPRC 950 AM

Programming
- Format: Talk radio
- Network: Fox News Radio
- Affiliations: Houston Cougars; Premiere Networks; Westwood One; KPRC-TV

Ownership
- Owner: iHeartMedia, Inc.; (iHM Licenses, LLC)
- Sister stations: KBME; KODA; KQBT; KTBZ-FM; KTRH; KXYZ

History
- First air date: May 9, 1925
- Call sign meaning: K(C)otton Port Rail Center

Technical information
- Licensing authority: FCC
- Facility ID: 9644
- Class: B
- Power: 7,000 watts day; 4,300 watts night
- Transmitter coordinates: 29°54′55.8″N 95°27′48.8″W
- Repeater: 94.5 KTBZ-FM HD3 (Houston)

Links
- Public license information: Public file; LMS
- Webcast: Listen live (via iHeartRadio)
- Website: kprcradio.iheart.com

KPRC (950 kHz) is a broadcast radio station in the United States. Licensed to Houston, Texas, it has a talk radio format and is owned by iHeartMedia. KPRC broadcasts mostly conservative talk radio shows and is the home base for the nationally syndicated Walton & Johnson and The Jesse Kelly Show. Additionally, KPRC broadcasts University of Houston sports.

KPRC first signed on in 1925 as the radio station of the Houston Post-Dispatch. For much of its history, KPRC was a full service station featuring news, music, sports and entertainment. KPRC was also the flagship station for the Houston Astros baseball team from its 1962 founding to 1980 and again from 1990 to 1995, and the Houston Rockets' first five seasons in Houston from 1971 to 1976, then again from 1981 to 1985 and 1998 to 2002. Having been an MOR music station since the 1960s, KPRC switched to full-time news and talk in 1977. The station was owned by the family of Post-Dispatch founder William P. Hobby before being sold to Sunbelt Broadcasting, a company partially owned by future lieutenant governor Dan Patrick. Sunbelt then sold KPRC to Clear Channel Communications (now iHeartMedia) in 1995.

== History ==
=== Early history (1923–1941) ===
In 1923, Houston Post-Dispatch owner Ross S. Sterling met Alfred P. Daniel, a radio instructor at a Houston YMCA whose students included Sterling's son Ross Sterling Jr. The elder Sterling and Daniel discussed starting a new radio station affiliated with the Post-Dispatch. William P. Hobby, president and publisher of the Post-Dispatch, asked Sterling to launch the radio station.

Before a 500 watt Westinghouse Electric transmitter arrived in Houston, Sterling Jr. died. In 1925, when the World Advertising Convention was to be held in Houston featuring U.S. Commerce Secretary Herbert Hoover, Daniel again talked to Sterling Sr. about the radio station idea. Sterling agreed, and the radio station was created in three weeks. On May 9, 1925, their radio station KPRC signed-on on 1010 kHz with 500 watts of power, with Daniel as the station's first announcer and program director. Guests on the opening broadcast included William P. Hobby, Texas poet laureate Judd Mortimer Lewis, and the First Garrison Band of Mexico. The call signs stood for "Kotton Port Rail Center", a reference to the cotton trade.

Broadcasting from the "Skyline Studios" at the 22-story Houston Post-Dispatch building in downtown Houston, KPRC featured daily live music and a daily children's storytelling show hosted by Lewis, Uncle Judd's Kiddies' Hour.

In 1927, it interrupted its scheduled programming to give out dispatches for the Houston Police Department. That year, KPRC moved from 1010 to 920 kHz. Tex Ritter had a Saturday show on KPRC in the late 1920s singing original country ballads.

KPRC co-founded the Texas Quality Network (TQN) in 1934 with three of the other top radio stations in Texas: WBAP in Fort Worth, WFAA in Dallas, and WOAI in San Antonio. Connecting the four stations by telephone line, TQN enabled them to make simultaneous broadcasts of the same program. The four stations also provided over 100 kW of power combined at night. TQN featured sports and music programs sponsored by various local businesses, for instance football games sponsored by Humble Oil and The Light Crust Doughboys, a country music show. By 1935, KPRC became a member of the NBC Radio Network.

KPRC increased its power tenfold to 5 kW in 1936. Then in 1937, KPRC and KTRH co-installed what was the second transmitter in the world that could send waves from two stations at the same time.

=== Move to 950 kHz, additions of FM and TV stations (1941–1958) ===
KPRC moved to its current frequency of 950 kHz on May 22, 1941, under the terms of the North American Regional Broadcasting Agreement (NARBA). The Houston Post later expanded into FM radio and television, starting with founding KPRC-FM in 1946. In 1950, the Houston Post purchased KLEE-TV and renamed it KPRC-TV.

Construction began in 1952 for a new $400,000 facility for operating the KPRC AM, FM, and TV stations.

=== Sale of FM station, MOR format (1958–1977) ===
The Houston Post sold KPRC-FM in 1958.

In the 1960s and much of the 1970s, KPRC had a middle of the road (MOR) music format. A 1966 advertisement claimed that the station had the largest news staff of any Houston radio station and 20 billboards that had lights connected by telephone lines to its newsroom. The billboard lights shined when KPRC had news broadcasts.

During Hurricane Carla in September 1961, KPRC AM and TV broadcast live coverage for 113 straight hours, starting three days before the hurricane reached land; KPRC AM was the flagship station among nearly 40 affiliates of the Gulf Coast Hurricane Warning Network.

In 1962, KPRC broadcast the inaugural season of the Houston Colt .45s, a new Major League Baseball team. When the Colt .45s became the Houston Astros in 1965, KPRC continued broadcasting the games, with Gene Elston and Loel Passe hired as announcers. Other sports programming in the 1960s included University of Houston basketball, Rice University basketball, and Southwest Conference football.

Billboard magazine's Radio Response Ratings survey in April 1965 found that KPRC had the highest ratings among stations that played pop standards albums, in all time slots from morning to late evening. The strong ratings continued into 1966, when KPRC began adding comedy shows and jazz music.

Beginning in the 1971–72 season, KPRC began broadcasting Houston Rockets NBA basketball games, in the team's first season after moving from San Diego.

The KPRC TV and AM stations moved to a new $3.2 million, 86,000 square foot facility on March 22, 1972. Former U.S. President Lyndon B. Johnson visited the dedication ceremony that day.

In the spring 1976 Arbitron survey, KPRC ranked tenth in the Houston/Galveston market with an average 15,100 listeners per week. Having reduced music programming in recent years, KPRC changed its programming in 1976 to have talk shows during the day and music in evenings. In another programming change, after the 1975–76 season, the Rockets moved their game broadcasts from KPRC to KXYZ.

=== Change from music to talk, final years under Hobby ownership (1977–1992) ===
Beginning in 1977, KPRC dropped music and changed to a news/talk station. KPRC showed improvement in the spring 1977 Arbitron ratings from the previous year, this time averaging 17,200 listeners per 15 minutes and ranking eighth in Houston/Galveston.

In 1979, KPRC hired Anita Martini as sports director. She was reportedly the first woman to become a radio sports director in a major media market.

After the 1980 season, KPRC lost the Astros broadcasting rights to KENR in 1981. However, KPRC resumed Houston Rockets broadcasts from 1981 to 1985.

In 1983, the Hobby family corporation was renamed H&C Communications, and it sold the Houston Post to the Toronto Sun Publishing Corporation.

After decades of being affiliated with NBC, KPRC changed to the CBS Radio Network in February 1988.

Ten years after the last game broadcast on KPRC, the Houston Astros signed a new contract with KPRC in November 1990 following a mutual agreement with previous station KTRH to end their contract one year early.

=== Further sales, shift to conservative talk (1992–present) ===
KPRC and sister station KSEV were branded together as "SuperTalk" for much of the 1990s.

In October 1992, H&C Communications announced the sale of KPRC AM to Sunbelt Broadcasting Company for $3.5 million, with the sale being finalized in February 1993. With that acquisition, former KHOU sports director Dan Patrick became general manager and part-owner of both KPRC and sister station KSEV. He had his own talk show on KPRC until 2000.

KPRC had been declining in the ratings leading up to the purchase by Sunbelt, ranked 16th in the Houston/Galveston market in fall 1992. Following the sale closing, in an effort to make the two stations more competitive against KTRH, Patrick announced changes to the KPRC and KSEV schedules to focus on conservative talk radio effective April 5, 1993. Branded as "Supertalk Radio", both stations would simulcast The Rush Limbaugh Show; KPRC also added commentary segments by Paul Harvey and Jim Hightower and a sports talk show co-hosted by Houston Chronicle columnist Ed Fowler and play-by-play announcer John O'Reilly, Sports Page.

Then in March 1994, Patrick hired former Houston mayor Kathy Whitmire, a Democrat, to host a nightly show. Patrick commented: "Whitmire will lend some balance. She's a liberal-to-moderate Democrat, and I think to have a female liberal Democrat on the air will be neat." That show would be short lived. In July, Whitmire accepted an offer to become president and CEO of Junior Achievement effective September 6.

Sunbelt, in turn, sold KPRC and KSEV to Clear Channel Communications in 1995 for a combined $26.8 million, ending nearly 70 years of local ownership for KPRC.

Following the 1995 Houston Astros season, KPRC lost the Astros broadcasting rights in January 1996 to KILT (610 AM), a sports station then owned by Westinghouse Broadcasting. Among the Astros' stated reasons for the change of affiliation were a perceived stronger signal from KILT and the sports format allowing for more promotion of the team, in contrast to KPRC moving some games to KSEV when there were conflicts with regularly scheduled talk shows like Rush Limbaugh. However, Patrick disputed the Astros' claim about KILT having a stronger signal due to both stations having 5 kW of power. Eventually, the Houston Chronicle reported in April 1996 that due to listener complaints about poor reception of KILT in Montgomery County (specifically The Woodlands and Conroe), the Astros radio network added Conroe station KJOJ.

Beginning around December 1998, KPRC hired former Apollo 7 astronaut Walter Cunningham to host a nightly 8 p.m. show, Liftoff to Logic. For the third time, KPRC had Houston Rockets games from 1998 to 2002.

On August 29, 2000, Patrick resigned from KPRC after seven years as general manager and talk show host. KPRC subsequently added The Dr. Laura Program.

KPRC was branded "Talk Radio 950 KPRC" from 2001 to 2007.

In March 2001, KPRC re-branded as "Talk Radio 950 KPRC". That month, Chris Baker joined as a new afternoon drive host. In another programming change, Ian Punnett replaced Cunningham as 8 p.m. host around February 2001.

Baker moved to sister station KTRH effective November 15, 2004.

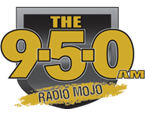
Logo of KPRC's previous "The 9-5-0 Radio Mojo" brand used from 2007 to 2013.

On July 30, 2007, KPRC became the new flagship station for the Walton & Johnson morning show, which moved from Cumulus Media's Houston rock station KIOL. Beginning August 2007, KPRC rebranded as "The 9-5-0 Radio Mojo", with Chris Baker returning to supplement his other show on KTRH and nationally syndicated shows including The Dave Ramsey Show, Mancow, and The Phil Hendrie Show. Also in 2007, KPRC began carrying news updates from Fox News Radio.

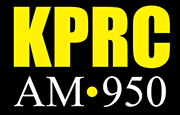
Previous KPRC logo from 2013 to 2019.

On March 17, 2013, KPRC dropped the Radio Mojo brand and became known as "KPRC AM 950, Houston's More Stimulating Talk Radio".

On July 28, 2014, KPRC signed a contract to broadcast University of Houston football and men's basketball. KPRC and the University of Houston renewed their contract in August 2020.

In April 2025, KPRC and other iHeartMedia stations began broadcasting Verdict with Ted Cruz, a podcast hosted by Texas U.S. Senator Ted Cruz. This marked the first time a sitting U.S. senator hosted a talk radio show.

== Programming ==
iHeartMedia owns two news-talk radio stations in Houston. KPRC carries mostly nationally syndicated shows while KTRH has mostly local hosts. Two syndicated programs, Walton & Johnson and The Jesse Kelly Show, originate from KPRC. National programming on weekdays includes the Glenn Beck Radio Program, Armstrong & Getty, The Will Cain Show, The Mark Levin Show and Coast to Coast AM. On weekends, KPRC has mostly brokered time programs purchased by local businesses. Most hours begin with an update from Fox News Radio.

KPRC also broadcasts local sports, specifically Houston Cougars football and Houston Cougars men's basketball games from the University of Houston. It also carries Texas Longhorns men's basketball from the University of Texas at Austin.

== Technical information ==
The station's studios are located near the West Loop Freeway in Uptown Houston.

KPRC transmits with 7,000 watts non-directional by day. At night, to avoid interference to other stations on 950 AM, it reduces power to 4,300 watts and it uses a directional antenna with a four-tower array. The transmitter site is located at 3000 Hansom Road in Houston. For listeners with an HD radio, KPRC can be heard on sister station KTBZ-FM 94.5 on the station's HD3 subchannel.
