= KODA =

Adult contemporary radio station in Houston

- Houston, Texas; United States
- Broadcast area: Greater Houston
- Frequency: 99.1 MHz (HD Radio)
- Branding: Sunny 99.1

Programming
- Language: English
- Format: Adult contemporary
- Subchannels: HD2: Talk (KTRH); HD3: Bilingual AC "Retro"
- Affiliations: Premiere Networks

Ownership
- Owner: iHeartMedia; (iHM Licenses, LLC)
- Sister stations: KBME; KPRC; KQBT; KTBZ-FM; KTRH; KXYZ

History
- First air date: December 24, 1946
- Former call signs: KPRC-FM (1946–1958); KHGM-FM (1958–1961); KODA-FM (1967–1980)
- Former frequencies: 99.7 MHz (1946–1947); 102.9 MHz (1947–1959)
- Call sign meaning: derived from former sister station KODA AM (now KLAT)

Technical information
- Licensing authority: FCC
- Facility ID: 35337
- Class: C
- ERP: 100,000 watts
- HAAT: 585 meters (1,919 ft)
- Transmitter coordinates: 29°34′34″N 95°30′36″W

Links
- Public license information: Public file; LMS
- Webcast: Listen live (via iHeartRadio)
- Website: sunny99.iheart.com

KODA (99.1 FM, "Sunny 99.1") is an American commercial adult contemporary-formatted radio station in Houston, Texas. The station is owned by iHeartMedia. Its studios and offices are located along the West Loop Freeway in Uptown Houston.

KODA has an effective radiated power (ERP) of 100,000 watts. The Senior Road Tower transmitter is off Farm to Market Road 2234 near Fort Bend Parkway in Southwest Houston. KODA broadcasts in the HD Radio hybrid format, with its sister station KTRH simulcasting on KODA's HD2 subchannel.

== History ==
On Christmas Eve, 1946, the station signed on as KPRC-FM. It was owned by the Houston Post daily newspaper, which also owned KPRC and would acquire KPRC-TV in 1951. (When KPRC AM signed on in May 1925, the call letters stood for Kotton Port Rail Center, a slogan promoting Houston commerce.) In its early years, KPRC-FM mostly simulcast its AM sister station.

KPRC-FM began broadcasting on 99.7 MHz until 1947 when it moved to 102.9 MHz. In 1958, the FM station was sold and changed its call sign to KHGM-FM. It moved to 99.1 MHz in 1959.

In 1961, it changed call letters again, this time to KODA-FM, and aired a beautiful music format. (KODA refers to the musical term coda, indicating an extended passage which brings a piece to an end.) Several months later, KODA (1010 AM) went on the air as an AM daytimer, with the two stations simulcasting. KODA-FM continued the station's programming independently from sunset to sunrise. KODA-AM-FM and their easy listening format proved to be quite popular, and enjoyed high ratings through the 1960s and 70s.

KODA-AM-FM were sold to Westinghouse Broadcasting (Group W) in 1978, and were shortly broken up when the AM station was quickly re-sold. The easy listening format continued on KODA-FM, which was renamed KODA when the AM station took new call letters. The station was the flagship radio station for the Houston Oilers (now the Tennessee Titans) of the National Football League during the 1986 season.

The station was sold to SFX Broadcasting in 1989. SFX was amalgamated into AMFM Inc. and acquired by Clear Channel Communications (now iHeartMedia) in 1999. By the mid-1990s, KODA had begun adding more vocals to its playlist, and reducing the instrumentals, until it made the transition to soft adult contemporary.

The station, which had long been identified as K-O-D-A or "Coda", relabeled itself as "The All-New Sunny 99.1" in February 1991. The new moniker reflected the evolution from soft adult contemporary to mainstream adult contemporary under the direction of general manager Dusty Black and program director Dave Dillon. Since 2001, between mid-November and December 25, the station switches formats to all-Christmas music.
