= KEYH =

Radio station in Houston, Texas

- Houston, Texas; United States
- Broadcast area: Greater Houston
- Frequency: 850 kHz
- Branding: La Mejor 104.5

Programming
- Language: Spanish
- Format: Regional Mexican
- Affiliations: MVS Radio

Ownership
- Owner: Hector Guevara Ministry Corp.; (Latino Broadcasting Corporation)
- Sister stations: KJOZ

History
- First air date: November 18, 1974
- Call sign meaning: "The Key to Houston"

Technical information
- Licensing authority: FCC
- Facility ID: 2911
- Class: D
- Power: 10,000 watts (day); 185 watts (night); STA: 100 watts (days only)
- Transmitter coordinates: 29°39′19″N 95°40′19″W
- Translator: 104.5 K283CH (Houston)

Links
- Public license information: Public file; LMS
- Website: lamejordigital.com

KEYH (850 AM, "La Mejor 104.5") is a commercial radio station licensed to Houston, Texas, United States, that currently operates during the daytime hours only. Owned by Hector Guevara Ministry Corp., KEYH airs a regional Mexican format affiliated with MVS Radio of Mexico. The station's current transmitter is sited in Houston's Northline district; in addition to their standard analog transmission, the station is relayed full-time over low-power Houston FM translator K283CH (104.5 FM).

After the loss of its main transmitter site, due to the sale of the land the array sat upon, KEYH went silent from January 1 until December 27, 2021. KEYH's previous format, prior to going silent, was Regional Mexican, with sports programming interspersed. KEYH was previously owned by Estrella Media and upon getting back on on December 27, 2021 temporarily rebroadcast Estrella Media's sister station "La Raza" 98.5 KTJM. However, on January 10, 2022, KEYH began broadcasting classic hits with the branding name "Joe 850". The launch of "Joe 850" made a classic hits comeback to the Houston market.

The former transmitter location was near Denver Miller Road in Sugar Land, Texas.

== History ==
On November 18, 1974, KEYH first signed on as a daytimer, required to be off the air between sunset and sunrise. It was owned by Artlite Broadcasting and aired an all-news format, affiliated with the Mutual Broadcasting System and the Associated Press. The all-news format did not generate many listeners so talk shows were added.

KEYH's slogan was "The Key to Houston" and featured a long key with the station's 850 dial setting and call sign featured in its logo. KEYH struggled to gain footing in the market and began airing Mexican music on weekends while continuing the news/talk format on weekdays. With Houston's growing Mexican-American population, the Spanish-language music featured on the weekends proved popular. By the end of the 1970s, KEYH went full-time Regional Mexican and became a direct competitor to the original Spanish-language station in Houston, AM 1480 KLVL.

KEYH has gone through several owners and variations of formats since then, including an incarnation of "La Ranchera" which marked the third time KEYH has used the name (both in conjunction with 101.7 KNTE Bay City and as a standalone). In 2003, Liberman Broadcasting, based in Burbank, California, purchased KEYH for $5.7 million.

From 2018 to Early 2021, the station aired Spanish-language broadcasts of the Major League Baseball's Houston Astros.

After the loss of its main transmitter site, due to the sale of the land the array sat upon, KEYH went silent from January 1 until December 27, 2021. KEYH's previous format, prior to going silent, was Regional Mexican, with sports programming interspersed. KEYH upon getting back on in late 2021 temporarily rebroadcast Estrella Media's sister station "La Raza" 98.5 KTJM. However, on January 10, 2022, KEYH began broadcasting classic hits with the branding name "Joe 850". The launch of "Joe 850" made a classic hits comeback to the Houston market.

In October 2022, KEYH rebranded as "Houston Radio Platinum".

In January 2024, Hector Guevara Ministry Corp. begun operating KEYH via LMA and began airing a Spanish Christian format under the "La Nueva" brand.

In March 2024, Hector Guervara Ministry Corp. filed to purchase KEYH and the sale was consummated on June 6, 2024.

In September 2024, KEYH switched to a South Asian format under the branding "Radio Dabang 99.5", relayed by 99.5 translators K258BZ in Sugar Land and K258DA in Houston.

In March 2025, KEYH switched to Regional Mexican under the "La Mejor" brand from MVS Radio of Mexico, relayed by translator K283CH on 104.5 in Houston.

== FM translator ==
On August 14, 2015, following the final song “Amor Prohibido” by Tejano artist Selena, K283CH adopted a Regional Mexican format under the brand La Mejor 104.5 FM. The station was launched by media executive Omar Romero, CEO of Latino Broadcasting Corporation.

Logo as 104.5 Kiss FM

On August 14, 2015, K283CH signed on the air at 104.5 FM. It was leased by iHeartMedia to relay KTBZ-FM HD2, which carried a regional Mexican format branded as La Mejor.

On September 7, 2017, the station switched to a simulcast of KQBT HD2, which launched a new urban adult contemporary format as 104.5 Kiss FM. The new station aimed to compete against Urban One's dominant KMJQ.

On February 18, 2019, the lease with iHeart Media ended, leading the owner operator, Centro Cristiano de Vida Eterna, to air an independent mix of urban gospel and R&B under the branding 104–5 I Hope FM. The previous format continued to be broadcast on KQBT HD2 as 93.7 HD2 Kiss FM until June 2019.

Broadcast translator for KEYH
Call sign	Frequency	City of license	FID	ERP (W)	HAAT	Class	Transmitter coordinates	FCC info	Notes
K283CH	104.5 FM	Houston	146522	99	302 m (991 ft)	D	29°45′31″N 95°22′04″W	LMS	Owned by Space City Broadcasting
