= Chris Baker (talk radio host) =

American talk radio host

- Born: United States
- Occupation: Radio talk host

Chris Baker is a talk radio host who has worked in South Florida, Minneapolis, Houston and Omaha.

Baker grew up in Dallas. He worked in St. Louis, then moved to Houston where he worked until his show was canceled in 2007.

In 2006, the Houston Press wrote of Baker, “Chris Baker is the leading local talk-show host in town; since the town in question is Houston.” He was a 2008 nominee for the Texas Radio Hall of Fame. Described by critics as working in “shock-jockery”, Baker has drawn criticism for remarks about Magic Johnson, Barack Obama, the WBNA, gay people, women, and transgender people. Following the 2008 comments about Johnson, his station at the time, KTLK in Minneapolis, offered regrets for the remarks and aired public service announcements about HIV/AIDS. On April 21, 2021, Baker was fired as the afternoon talk host on NewsRadio 1110 KFAB in Omaha, Nebraska after making a racist tweet following the conviction of Derek Chauvin, to which he responded that he had accidentally posted the wrong photo.

On 23 February 2026, KFAB Announced the return of Chris Baker to the station, effective 26 February 2026, ending Baker's nearly five year hiatus from the station. During the five years the Baker was absent from the station, KFAB, replaced Baker with Ian Swanson and Emery Songer.

Baker is also a standup comedian.
