= KNTH =

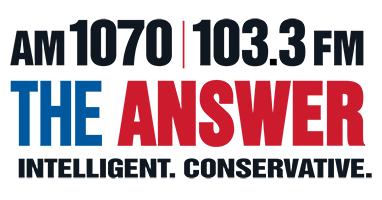
- Houston, Texas; United States
- Broadcast area: Greater Houston
- Frequency: 1070 kHz
- Branding: AM 1070 The Answer

Programming
- Format: Conservative talk
- Affiliations: Townhall News; Salem Radio Network

Ownership
- Owner: Salem Media Group; (Salem Communications Holding Corporation)
- Sister stations: KKHT-FM

History
- First air date: January 17, 1968
- Former call signs: KENR (1968–1983); KRBE (1983–1988); KKZR (1988–1991); KRBE (1991–1993); KCRR (1993); KRBE (1993–1994); KENR (1994–2000); KKHT (2000–2004)
- Call sign meaning: News Talk Houston

Technical information
- Licensing authority: FCC
- Facility ID: 61174
- Class: B
- Power: 10,000 watts (day); 5,000 watts (night)
- Transmitter coordinates: 29°59′33″N 95°28′23″W
- Translator: 103.3 K277DE (Houston)

Links
- Public license information: Public file; LMS
- Webcast: Listen live
- Website: am1070theanswer.com

KNTH (1070 AM) is a commercial radio station licensed to Houston, Texas, United States, and serving Greater Houston. Owned by the Salem Media Group, it features a conservative talk format branded "AM 1070 The Answer", with programming sourced from the Salem Radio Network. KNTH's studios are located on Savoy Drive near Interstate 69, in the Sharpstown district of Southwest Houston.

The transmitter is sited in Northwest Harris County on Welcome Lane near T.C. Jester Boulevard in Bammel Village. Programming is also heard on 250-watt FM translator K277DE at 103.3 MHz.

== History ==
=== The glory years as "Keener Country" ===
The station signed on the air on January 17, 1968, as KENR. In its early years, it served as a full service country music station. It was a 5,000-watt daytimer, required to go off the air at night. It was owned by Bill Edwards of Saginaw, Michigan.

In 1971, the station began broadcasting 24 hours a day and increased its power to 10,000 watts daytime and 5,000 watts at night. Disc jockeys on "Keener" Country in the early days included Eddie Kilroy, who went on to become a prominent country music record producer in Nashville, and Jacky Ward, who subsequently scored country hits of his own with songs such as "Fools Fall In Love" and "Big Blue Diamond."

When KENR started broadcasting around the clock, Leroy J. Gloger, then-owner of 650 KIKK, sold his station to Sonderling Broadcasting. In the meantime, KNUZ's owner, Dave Morris, who felt his station was losing a Top 40 turf war with KILT and was also being hurt by KULF, so he flipped the station's format to "Country Fresh Kay-News" in 1973.

By 1973, KENR was a big success, becoming the first major-market country station to be ranked #1 in all demographic groups 12 years old and older. DJ and music director "Dr. Bruce" Nelson Stratton had a hand in this and, accordingly, was named "Gavin Music Director of the Year" in 1974. The station reportedly helped boost the careers of country stars Mickey Gilley, Freddy Fender, Johnny Lee and Gene Watson. Gilley was essentially a local Houston-area artist when, in 1974, he cut a single, "She Called Me Baby", to be distributed in jukeboxes around the adjacent city of Pasadena, Texas. Nelson found the record, flipped it over and played the B-side on the air. The song, "Room Full Of Roses", became a hit, Playboy Records picked it up and it became the first of sixteen #1 country chart hits for Gilley. Nelson also started, on KENR, the first live broadcast from Gilley's Nightclub, the "Saturday Night Special", which evolved into the syndicated Live at Gilley's show that was popular during the "Urban Cowboy" craze.

The liner notes of Watson's 1975 album "Love In the Hot Afternoon" includes the statement, "We at Capitol Records owe a debt of gratitude to radio stations KENR, KIKK and KNUS (sic; this should read KNUZ) in Houston for their part in exposing the talents of Gene Watson ..." The album included three country hits, including "You Could Know As Much About A Stranger."

Around 1976-77, KENR's DJ lineup included morning man "Buffalo Bill" Bailey (whose act included appearances by Ezra Brooks and other denizens of the Let It Pour Lounge); late-morning DJ Hal McClain (whose schtick included call-in sessions by "Granny"); early-afternoon DJ Dick Martin followed by Bruce Nelson in afternoon drive and DJ Mike Cannon evening drive. Bailey later became a Harris County constable. Mike Cannon went on to become director of communications for The Houston Astros baseball organization and was referred to affectionately on the game broadcasts by legendary announcer, Milo Hamilton, as "Mike, the loose Cannon".

Other DJs during KENR's tenure included Howard Reynolds (1980) and Jim Rose (1981). Additionally, helicopter traffic reporter "Chopper Bill" Waldrop worked there in 1981 as well. Another Jock of note was Sonny Ray Stolz (1977–1981) who was Houston's first FM Country DJ, having signed on KIKK-FM in September 1966 and had a 14-point rating share. Sonny became the voice of Big Tex for The State Fair of Texas after statewide announcer competition in 2001. While at KENR, Sonny Ray Stolz produced 'The Original Home Grown Show' which featured strictly Texas music and Texas artists, a ground-breaking concept which spawned several imitators across the state. However, KENR was the first to provide this forum.

Circa 1979-80, KENR management brought in Joe Formicolla to be the new program director. At times he also filled in on-air. Although his distinct northern accent was a handicap for being on-air in Texas country music, Formicolla did bring the concept of dropping interesting trivia into the course of an air shift, requiring all DJs to do likewise. They actually read items from sources such as The National Enquirer, etc. Formicolla left KENR circa 1981 and later was awarded Country Music DJ of the Year by the Country Music Association and recognized during its annual awards TV program from Nashville.

=== KENR Goes Gold ===
In 1981, KILT-FM changed formats to country from album rock in January. Longtime top 40 sister KILT followed suit in June. Additionally, nationwide, music on AM was fading at that time.

KENR responded by becoming "Keener Country Gold" airing classic country hits. But it was being seriously hurt by KIKK-FM and both versions of KILT.

=== KENR Drops Country; Becomes "The Radio Magazine" ===
In 1982, the new management of Lake Huron flipped KENR's format to news/talk as "The Radio Magazine, KENR." Former KNUZ air personality Joe Ford became morning man, Chuck Scott from channel 39 KHTV (now KIAH) did news and former WABC New York host Peggy Crone handled entertainment news. John Greer and Mark Seegers did sports. Mike Shiloh was also on the staff as well. The station also carried Houston Astros play-by-play. And Bob Stephenson aired an outdoors show at 4 a.m.

Aside from news, talk and sports, the station also programmed adult standards music. Former KNUZ air personality Chuck Tiller was on the afternoon shift 2 p.m.-6 p.m. By November 1982, the station's music changed to soft adult contemporary. The call letters were switched to KRBE on January 1, 1983, and the station became the Radio Magazine KRBE. By spring, Houston Astros ballgames were simulcast on KRBE-FM. The radio magazine ceased in June 1983.

=== As KRBE ===
AM 1070 subsequently went through periodic format changes, occasionally simulcasting sister station 104.1 KRBE (which flipped back to top 40 in late 1984) and, at other times, airing such formats as classic rock and active rock.

=== Susquehanna Acquires KRBE ===
In November 1986, the Susquehanna Radio Corporation purchased KRBE AM & FM. AM 1070, by then, was playing classic rock music. The format was dropped in January 1987, and returned to a simulcast of KRBE-FM, which lasted until early 1988.

=== Z Rock Comes to Houston ===
After breaking simulcast with its FM counterpart this time, KRBE began running the hard rock format "Z-Rock" from the Satellite Music Network. The call letters switched to KKZR. Z-Rock lasted less than three years. Susquehanna changed 1070 AM's call letters back to KRBE on January 1, 1991, and went back to simulcasting the FM when its agreement with SMN ended.

=== Susquehanna Sells the AM ===
The station briefly took on the KCRR ("Community Recall Radio") call letters when Susquehanna sold time to a religious broadcaster in 1993. But that deal fell through within four months. The KRBE call sign and simulcast returned.

In April 1994, the KENR call sign was restored and the station was sold.

=== Salem Acquires KENR ===
KNTH ident used until 2007.

KNTH ident used until 2013.

Salem Communications purchased KENR in the mid-1990s and broadcast brokered ethnic programming for the first few years. In 2000, Salem sold KKHT 106.9 (now KHPT) to the Cox Media Group for $80 million, plus five other Cox radio stations in other cities.

Salem then moved the Christian talk and teaching format and call letters from 106.9 to AM 1070, which became "1070 The Word, KKHT". In 2002, Salem purchased 100.7 FM in Lumberton from Univision and moved the Christian talk format and call letters to 100.7. Thus, it became "100.7 The Word, KKHT". At the same time, Salem flipped AM 1070 to the Salem's talk radio format as "Newstalk 1070 KNTH". Former KNUZ and KILT air personality Chuck Tiller served as KNTH's morning announcer and newscaster on Bill Bennett's Morning In America wake-up show.

== Translator ==
Broadcast translator for KNTH
Call sign	Frequency	City of license	FID	ERP (W)	HAAT	Class	FCC info	Notes
K277DE	103.3 FM	Houston, Texas	138173	250	156 m (512 ft)	D	LMS	First air date: May 16, 2017
