= KTRH =

News/talk radio station in Houston

- Houston, Texas; United States
- Broadcast area: Greater Houston
- Frequency: 740 kHz
- Branding: Newsradio 740 KTRH

Programming
- Format: Talk radio
- Network: ABC News Radio
- Affiliations: Premiere Networks; Fox News Radio; The Weather Channel; KPRC-TV

Ownership
- Owner: iHeartMedia, Inc.; (iHM Licenses, LLC)
- Sister stations: KBME; KODA; KPRC; KQBT; KTBZ-FM; KXYZ

History
- First air date: April 22, 1922
- Former call signs: WCM (1922–1925); KUT (1925–1929)
- Former frequencies: 833 kHz (1922–1924); 1120 kHz (1924–1925); 1300 kHz (1925–1927); 1100 kHz (1927); 1290 kHz (1927–1928); 1120 kHz (1928–1934); 1330 kHz (1934–1935); 1290 kHz (1935–1941); 1320 kHz (1941–1942)
- Call sign meaning: The Rice Hotel

Technical information
- Licensing authority: FCC
- Facility ID: 35674
- Class: B
- Power: 50,000 watts
- Transmitter coordinates: 29°57′57.8″N 94°56′32.7″W
- Repeater: 99.1 KODA-HD2 (Houston)

Links
- Public license information: Public file; LMS
- Webcast: Listen live (via iHeartRadio)
- Website: ktrh.iheart.com

KTRH (740 kHz) is a commercial radio station licensed to Houston, Texas. It airs a news/talk radio format and is owned by iHeartMedia, Inc. Its studios are along the West Loop Freeway (I-610) in the city's Uptown district. The transmitter site, a four-tower array, is in unincorporated Liberty County, off Cox Road in Dayton. KTRH is one of the oldest radio stations in the United States, first licensed to Austin on April 22, 1922. Programming is also heard on co-owned KODA's HD 2 subchannel at 99.1 MHz, and on the iHeartRadio platform. KTRH is Southeast Texas' primary entry point station for the Emergency Alert System.

KTRH broadcasts with 50,000 watts around the clock, the highest power permitted by the Federal Communications Commission for commercial AM stations. But because it transmits on AM 740, a Canadian clear channel frequency, the station uses a directional antenna to protect Class A station CFZM in Toronto. During the day, the station provides at least secondary coverage to most southeast Texas, as far west as Austin and San Antonio and as far north as College Station and Lufkin, as well as much of southwestern Louisiana. At night, to protect CFZM, the station switches to a directional pattern with a significant null to the east, concentrating the signal in Houston, the Golden Triangle and Victoria.

== History ==
=== WCM in Austin ===
The station was first licensed, with randomly assigned call letters WCM on April 22, 1922. It was started by the University of Texas at Austin. (Initially call letters beginning with "W" were generally assigned to stations east of an irregular line formed by the western state borders from North Dakota south to Texas. Call signs beginning with "K" went only to stations in states west of that line. In January 1923, the Mississippi River was established as the new boundary. After this date, stations in Texas began receiving call letters beginning with "K." This is why the earliest stations in Texas, such as WOAI San Antonio and WBAP Fort Worth, still carry W call signs.)

WCM was authorized to broadcast on both the "entertainment" wavelength of 360 meters (833 kHz) and the "market and weather" wavelength of 485 meters (619 kHz). In November 1924 the station was relicensed to broadcast on 1120 kHz. On October 30, 1925, the station was relicensed with the new call letters of KUT, now operating on 1300 kHz. In early 1927 the station was assigned to 1100 kHz, and a few months later was assigned to 1290 kHz. On November 11, 1928, under the provisions of the Federal Radio Commission's General Order 40, the station moved back to 1120 kHz.

The university ultimately decided that it could not afford the expense of operating a radio station, and in early 1929 sold KUT to a group that planned to convert it from an educational to a commercial station.

=== Move to Houston ===
Jesse H. Jones, operator of the Rice Hotel (now the Post Rice Lofts) in Houston, Texas and owner of the Houston Chronicle, took over the station to meet its competition, the Houston Post, which was the first of the local papers with a radio affiliation (KPRC). In December 1929, the station's call letters were changed to KTRH (standing for The Rice Hotel), and its main studio was moved to Houston. (Simultaneously, station KGDR in San Antonio, Texas was renamed KUT and moved to Austin (now KJFK). In March 1930, the station began broadcasting from the Rice Hotel. KTRH aired shows from the Columbia Broadcasting System as part of its initial programming.

In mid-1934 KTRH shifted to 1330 kHz, which was followed late the next year by a move to 1290 kHz with 5,000 watts in the daytime and 1,000 watts at night. On March 29, 1941, with the implementation of the provisions of the North American Regional Broadcasting Agreement (NARBA), the stations on 1290 kHz were moved to 1320 kHz. The next year KTRH moved to its current frequency of 740 kHz, and got a boost in power to 50,000 watts.

In 1947, Houston's first FM station was added, 101.1 MHz KTRH-FM. The FM station mostly simulcast KTRH's programming when few people had FM radios.

KTRH (owned by the Chronicle at the time) had previously co-owned with its television counterpart KTRK-TV from its sign on in 1954 until 1967, when the station was sold to Capital Cities Communications. KTRK-TV has been an ABC owned-and-operated station since the CapCities merger in January 1986.

In the 1950s, as network programming moved from radio to TV, KTRH-AM-FM switched to a full service middle of the road (MOR) format. In 1965, KTRH-AM-FM were acquired by the Rusk Corporation. Under Rusk ownership, KTRH-FM experimented with progressive rock programs at night while simulcasting AM 740 in the daytime. In 1970, Rusk switched the FM station over to a full time rock format as KLOL.

Former CBS Evening News anchor Dan Rather worked for KTRH in the late 1950s as both anchor and reporter. In 1959, KTRH carried broadcasts of the Houston Buffs minor league baseball team. Rather was the main play by play announcer. The Gallup Poll's editor in chief Frank Newport was also a noted talk show host and news director at KTRH in the early 1980s. CBS Sports announcer Jim Nantz worked at KTRH while attending the University of Houston.

=== Ownership change ===
In 1993, Evergreen Media bought KTRH and KLOL for $49 million. Evergreen Media was later merged into Chancellor Media, which in turn was bought by Clear Channel Communications, the forerunner to today's owner, iHeartMedia. In 1995, Clear Channel also acquired KTRH's chief talk radio competitor, AM 950 KPRC. That means Clear Channel, and now iHeartMedia, has two talk radio stations in Houston, each airing slightly different programming. For a time, Houston-based syndicated host Michael Berry had shows on both stations, airing at different times. Berry is now heard twice a day on KTRH, while KTRH morning host Jimmy Barrett is also heard on KPRC for an hour in the afternoon.

KTRH was the Houston affiliate for CBS Radio News, before switching to ABC News Radio in 1997 and then to Fox News Radio in 2003. In early 2016, KTRH switched back to ABC. The Fox News affiliation moved to sister station KPRC.

== Programming ==
iHeartMedia owns two news-talk radio stations in Houston. KTRH has more local hosts while KPRC 950 AM carries more nationally syndicated programs.

Weekdays on KTRH begin with Jimmy Barrett anchoring Houston's Morning News. The Michael Berry Show, a syndicated program based at KTRH, airs in late mornings and again in early evenings. Berry is followed by The Clay Travis and Buck Sexton Show and The Sean Hannity Show (both syndicated via co-owned Premiere Networks). Weeknights feature The Will Cain Show (syndicated via Fox News Radio) and Our American Stories with Lee Habeeb, while Coast to Coast AM with George Noory (via Premiere) is heard overnight.

On weekends, shows on money, health, gardening, cars, home repair and the oil industry are heard. Syndicated programs include The Weekend with Michael Brown and Somewhere in Time with Art Bell. KTRH is affiliated with ABC News Radio. It has a news-sharing partnership with KPRC-TV 2, Houston's NBC affiliate, and it gets forecasts from The Weather Channel.

For many years, KTRH was the flagship station for the Houston Astros Radio Network. With the 2013 season, the Astros' play-by-play rights switched to sports radio sister station KBME 790 AM. KTRH occasionally airs Astros' baseball games when KBME is carrying Houston Rockets' basketball games.

== See also ==
- List of initial AM-band station grants in the United States
