= KBME (AM) =

- Houston, Texas; United States
- Broadcast area: Greater Houston
- Frequency: 790 kHz
- Branding: Sportstalk 790

Programming
- Language: English
- Format: Sports radio
- Affiliations: Fox Sports Radio; Houston Astros; Houston Rockets; Texas Longhorns

Ownership
- Owner: iHeartMedia; (iHM Licenses, LLC)
- Sister stations: KQBT, KODA, KPRC, KTBZ-FM, KTRH, KXYZ

History
- First air date: July 13, 1944
- Former call signs: KTHT (1944–1970); KULF (1970–1982); KKBQ (1982–1998)
- Former frequencies: 1230 kHz (1944–1951)
- Call sign meaning: "The Best Music Ever Made" (former slogan during the adult standards format era)

Technical information
- Licensing authority: FCC
- Facility ID: 23082
- Class: B
- Power: 5,000 watts
- Transmitter coordinates: 29°54′56.4″N 95°27′46.1″W
- Repeater: 94.5 KTBZ-FMHD2 (Houston)

Links
- Public license information: Public file; LMS
- Webcast: Listen live (via iHeartRadio)
- Website: sportstalk790.iheart.com

KBME (790 AM, "Sportstalk 790") is a radio station licensed to Houston, Texas, United States, and serving Greater Houston. Owned by iHeartMedia, the station carries a sports format as the local affiliate for Fox Sports Radio and the flagship for the Houston Rockets, Houston Astros and Texas Longhorns. The station's studios are located along the West Loop Freeway in the city's Uptown district. The transmitter site is located at what is now the southwest corner of Fallbrook Drive and T.C. Jester Boulevard, near Greenspoint in unincorporated Harris County.

== History ==
=== Early years ===
The station first went on the air as KTHT in July 13, 1944. It moved from 1230 kHz to the current 790 kHz in 1948. The frequency switch allowed KNUZ (now KCOH) to sign on at 1230 kHz. During the 1960s, KTHT was known as "Demand Radio 79", playing pop music.

In August 1970, it became adult contemporary KULF, hosting radio personalities such as Stevens and Pruett. Stevens and Pruett had formerly been on KILT as the last Hudson and Harrigan team before KILT's switch to country. S&P brought to KULF their "Not ready for Drive time Players", and their daily short production of "Star Trots" (modeled after Star Trek: The Motion Picture) with Captain James T. Shmirk, his trusted Lt. Bones, and their weird little robot, ACDC.

In June 1982, Gannett Publishing, through its broadcast subsidiary, bought the station, announced to the employees that were left (S&P had left for KEGL in the Dallas-Fort Worth market before the sale), on what was called "Black Friday" (July 2), that everyone was fired as of the following Monday, and relaunched it as top 40 station KKBQ ("79Q") on the 2nd.

Program director John Lander hosted the morning show, called the "Q-Zoo", and took the station to the top of the Houston ratings after one rating period - a feat unheard of for an AM music station in the 1980s. KKBQ would add an FM simulcast on 92.9 MHz on December 29, 1982. KKBQ was among the first AM stations in the city to broadcast in AM stereo, originally using the Kahn ISB system, and then later switching to the Motorola C-QUAM system.

Programming on KKBQ and KKBQ-FM ("93Q") simulcasted until January 16, 1998, when the AM station became the adult standards-formatted "Star 790 KBME" (for "Best Music Ever", although a joke among employees was "Keep Bringing Me Ex-Lax").

=== The Sports Animal ===
KMBE's logo as "ESPN 790, The Sports Animal"

On January 1, 2005, the station flipped to an all sports station, as "790 ESPN Radio, the Sports Animal." Houston sports talk legend Charlie Pallilo helped launch the new sports station and remained with the station for almost 12 years. The ESPN affiliation lasted until January 2007, when the network moved its programming to Cumulus Media-owned KFNC/97.5. At that point, KBME's sports talk programming shifted to a mix of local shows and programs from Fox Sports Radio, including the launch in late 2009 of "Matt & Adam in the Morning," a morning show hosted by Matt Jackson and Adam Wexler, who both moved over from KILT. "Matt & Adam" became "The Big Show" in fall 2011, when Lance Zierlein joined Jackson and Wexler. Previous hosts on KBME include Brad Davies, Carl Dukes, Ted Deluca, John Lopez, David Dalati, Tom Franklin.

During Hurricane Katrina's aftermath, The Sports Animal was an affiliate of United Radio Broadcasters of New Orleans, originating from WWL-AM, and parent company Clear Channel's New Orleans radio stations. The Sports Animal simulcasted their aftermath coverage as a public service to those who may have evacuated to the Houston area, and continued to do so until November 2005.

=== Live sports programming ===
KBME is the flagship station for Houston Rockets basketball, Houston Astros baseball.

Beginning with the 2012-2013 season, KBME became flagship station to the NBA's Houston Rockets, with iHeartMedia (then known as Clear Channel Communications) acquiring the team's radio rights from CBS Radio-owned KILT. In April 2013, KBME became the flagship station to Major League Baseball's Houston Astros, with broadcasts moving from sister station KTRH. For an interim period, games were simulcast on both stations. Prior to the move, KBME aired select Astros spring training games.

Streaming Astros coverage on the iHeart radio app is limited to Greater Houston, and is available nationally through the MLB app and SiriusXM.
