= Eyes of Texas =

Eyes of Texas may refer to:

- "The Eyes of Texas", a song set to the tune of "I've Been Working on the Railroad"
- Eyes of Texas (film), a 1948 American film directed by William Witney
- The Eyes of Texas (TV series)
