= Bill Worrell =

American sports journalist

- Born: June 2, 1944 (age 82); Houston, Texas, U.S.
- Education: University of Houston
- Occupation: Sportscaster
- Known for: Announcer for: Houston Rockets (1980–2021); Houston Astros (1985–2004)

William Hamilton Worrell Jr. (born June 2, 1944) is a retired American sportscaster known primarily as the home television play-by-play announcer for the Houston Rockets, a role he filled from the early 1980s until his retirement at the end of the 2020-21 NBA season. Worrell also served as a television broadcaster for Houston Astros baseball for 20 seasons. Worrell has hosted and broadcast a wide variety of other major sporting events over his four decades in sports media.

== Early life ==
Bill Worrell was born on June 2, 1944, in Houston. His father, William Hamilton "Dub" Worrell, was a team dentist for the Rice Owls, Houston Cougars, Houston Oilers, and the Houston Rockets; Bill Worrell Sr. introduced the use of mouthpieces to professional athletes in Houston.

Bill Worrell Jr. grew up on Houston's west side and graduated from Lamar High School. He matriculated at the University of Houston in 1964, where he originally hoped to follow his father into dentistry. While he was at UH, he participated in a variety of extracurricular activities, including pitching for the intercollegiate baseball team, which he did from 1964 to 1966.

Worrell ultimately chose to major in communications while in his sophomore year at the University of Houston. He had a talent for public speaking, and this became clear in his first on-air broadcasting job with UH campus radio station KUHF. After graduation, he was hired by legendary broadcaster Ray Miller of Houston NBC affiliate KPRC-TV to co-anchor Big 2 News alongside Larry Rasco. An avid, lifelong sports fan, Worrell eventually transitioned from hard news into full-time sports broadcasting. In 1974, the year after the death of previous sports director Bill Enis, Worrell became KPRC's sports director, a position he held until 1980.

== Sportscasting career ==
Worrell left KPRC to take an on-air job with the new cable sports network ESPN in 1980. That year, he began broadcasting Houston Rockets games for local TV on a part-time basis. He stayed with ESPN for three years before joining regional cable network startup Home Sports Entertainment in 1983 as a full-time play-by-play announcer for Rockets telecasts. Since then, Worrell has broadcast most Rockets’ games for local television, a period spanning 35 years. He has called the most notable seasons in franchise history, especially the team's consecutive championship seasons in 1994 and 1995. Worrell broadcast Rockets home games on AT&T SportsNet alongside color analysts and former Rockets players Clyde Drexler and Matt Bullard. He is widely recognized as the television voice of Houston Rockets basketball. He retired following the Rockets' final home game of the 2020-21 NBA season, a win against the Los Angeles Clippers.

Worrell has also broadcast a variety of other sports, most notably local television broadcasts of Houston Astros baseball. Worrell served as the color analyst for broadcasts of Astros games on Home Sports Entertainment and Fox Sports Net for 20 seasons, from 1985 to 2004. Given his primary role with the Rockets, Worrell covered Astros home telecasts mostly during the NBA off season. In 2005, popular former player and longtime color analyst Larry Dierker rejoined the Astros television broadcast team, a move that effectively ended Worrell's stint as an Astros color analyst. Worrell's departure from Astros telecasts was an amicable one, as it allowed him to focus his efforts on covering Houston Rockets basketball. Worrell has also broadcast various other sports, including Houston Oilers football, pro rodeo, table tennis, and major sporting events as varied as the Kentucky Derby and the Super Bowl.

== Honors and awards ==
Worrell is a six-time recipient of “Best Sportscast” award given by United Press International, and he won the Lone Star Emmy Award for “Best play-by-play announcer in Texas” in 2011. In 2013, the Houston Press named Worrell the best play-by-play announcer in the city.

The University of Houston honored Worrell as a distinguished alumnus in 2015 and inducted him into its athletics Hall of Honor in 2016.
