= Ron Stone (reporter) =

American journalist (1936–2008)

Ron Stone (April 6, 1936 – May 13, 2008) was an American news anchor at KPRC-TV in Houston for 20 years from 1973 to 1992. He was called "the most popular and revered news anchor the city has ever known" by the Houston Chronicle. He was president of Stonefilms, Inc., a Texas production company.

== Education and early career ==
Stone attended college and received a B.A. degree from East Central State University in Ada, Oklahoma. He earned a master's degree in liberal arts from Houston Baptist University. After college, Stone was a broadcaster for the National Football League and the Southwest Conference in the NCAA.

== Career ==
=== Television news career ===
Stone was born in Hanna, Oklahoma and graduated from East Central University in Ada, Oklahoma then known as East Central State Teachers College. He worked in radio and television in several small Oklahoma markets. He was working at KVOO-TV (now KJRH-TV) in Tulsa in 1961, when he caught the eye of Dan Rather, who was then KHOU Houston, Channel 11's lead anchor.

Stone began his television news career at Houston CBS affiliate KHOU, where he worked for nearly a decade except for a six-month period in 1968 where he went to Manhattan, New York to work as a news writer and reporter for the NBC Radio Network. In December 1973, Stone moved to NBC affiliate KPRC-TV in Houston as anchor for what was known at the time as Big 2 News.

While at KPRC-TV, he co-anchored the news with Paula Zahn, who later was an anchor at CNN and worked with Ron Franklin before Franklin moved to ESPN. Stone anchored the weekday editions of the ChannelTwoNews with Jan Carson from 1983 to 1991 and with Linda Lorelle during his final year at KPRC-TV.

=== Independent producer and other work ===
After retiring from television news in 1992, he started the production company, Stonefilms, Inc. with his son. In 1979, he succeeded Ray Miller (1919–2008) as host of KPRC-TV's The Eyes of Texas cultural anthology series. Stone hosted The Eyes of Texas until 1999.

On May 21, 2002, he anchored the news for one evening as a commemorative celebration along with veteran meteorologist Doug Johnson (1939 - 1/3/2019) at KPRC-TV. He was diagnosed with renal cell carcinoma and gave motivational speeches about cancer survival. Stone died of cancer. He was 72.

== Scholarly works ==
Stone wrote three books about Texas history, A Book of Texas Days, Disaster at Texas City, and Houston: Simply Spectacular. He served as artist in residence in the communications department at the University of St. Thomas in Houston.

== Awards ==
- Communicator of the Year, 1990, University of Houston School of Communications
- Honorary Doctor of Humane Letters Degree, University of Houston, 1994

== Professional membership ==
- Sons of the Republic of Texas
- Knight of San Jacinto

== See also ==
- Texas City disaster
