= H&C Communications =

American broadcasting company

- Formerly: Channel 2 Television Company (1950-1983)
- Company type: Private
- Industry: Broadcasting
- Founded: 1983; 43 years ago
- Defunct: 1995
- Fate: Television stations acquired by Post–Newsweek Stations
- Headquarters: Houston, Texas, United States
- Total assets: 8 TV stations and 2 radio stations
- Owner: The Hobby family

H&C Communications was an American broadcasting company that owned a number of media outlets throughout the United States. Originally known as Channel 2 Television Company, a reference to the channel number of flagship station KPRC-TV, it was created in 1983 to unite the Hobby family's television & radio interests under one umbrella after the Houston Post, their flagship business, was sold. The family became involved in broadcasting in the mid-1920s.

== Beginnings ==
In 1923, Ross Sterling Jr. took a course on broadcasting at the YMCA in Houston. His father, Ross Sterling Sr., met the instructor, Alfred P. Daniel (of now-discontinued radio station WCAK), and discussed starting a new radio station affiliated with the Houston Post. William P. Hobby, the president and publisher of the Post, asked Sterling to launch the radio station. Before a 500 watt transmitter ordered from the Westinghouse Electric Manufacturing Co. arrived in Houston, Sterling Jr. died. Sterling Sr., mourning the loss of his son, put the still crated transmitter in storage. Over one year later, Daniel approached Sterling Sr. and asked about proceeding with the establishment of the radio station. Sterling Sr. agreed with the idea and moved forward with establishing the station. KPRC's first broadcast occurred on Saturday May 9, 1925, with Daniel as the station's first announcer and program director. The federal license granting permission for radio broadcasts on 920 kHz was issued on May 13. (In 1941, KPRC moved to its current frequency of 950 kHz under terms of the North American Regional Broadcasting Agreement.)

== Houston cluster ==
On December 24, 1946, KPRC-FM (now 99.1 KODA) signed on the air. On June 1, 1950, the Hobbys purchased KLEE-TV Channel 2 and changed the television station's call letters on July 3, 1950, to KPRC-TV to create an AM-FM-TV combination. The television station had signed on the air on January 1, 1949, as KLEE-TV. It was Houston's first television station and the second one to sign on in Texas, three months behind Fort Worth station WBAP-TV (now KXAS-TV) and over eight months ahead of Dallas station KBTV (now WFAA). It was originally owned by hotelier W. Albert Lee and carried programming from all four networks of the day – NBC, CBS, ABC, and DuMont. After a year of difficulty, Lee sold the station to the Hobby family.

After the Hobbys took over, Channel 2 became a primary NBC affiliate due to KPRC radio's longstanding affiliation with the NBC Radio Network, a link that remains today. Due to the Federal Communications Commission-imposed freeze on new station licenses, Channel 2 remained the only television station in Houston for four more years. CBS moved to KGUL-TV (channel 11, now KHOU) in 1953 and KTRK-TV (channel 13) took over the ABC affiliation when it signed on one year later. DuMont ceased operations in 1956, though it was briefly affiliated with now-defunct KNUZ-TV (channel 39, frequency now occupied by KIAH).

== Expansion to liquidation ==
In 1958, the FM station was sold. In 1975, the Channel 2 Television Company acquired their second TV station, WLAC-TV, the CBS affiliate in Nashville, Tennessee, from Houston-based insurer American General Corporation. American General bought Life and Casualty Insurance Company of Tennessee in the 1960s and the acquisition included the WLAC-AM-FM-TV station assets. On December 1, 1975, the TV station adopted the current WTVF call sign due to an FCC rule in place at the time forbidding TV and radio stations in the same city, but with different owners, from sharing the same call letters.

More TV stations across the United States were acquired by the company within the next few years. In 1983, after the Post was sold, the Hobby family's broadcast holdings were reorganized into H&C Communications. The Hobbys began to liquidate their broadcasting assets in 1992. An attempt to sell stations in Houston, San Antonio, Orlando, Tucson and Des Moines to Young Broadcasting that year was unsuccessful. On April 22, 1994, the Texas stations, flagship KPRC-TV in Houston and KSAT-TV in San Antonio were sold to Post-Newsweek Stations (now Graham Media Group), a division of the Washington Post Company (now Graham Holdings Company).

In 1994, the Hobby family fully relinquished control and by the end of 1995, the H&C stations were liquidated to various owners and the company was eventually dissolved.

== Former stations ==
Stations are arranged in order of acquisition.

- (**) - Indicates stations built and signed on by the Hobby family.

Media market	State	Station	Purchased	Sold	Notes
Tucson	Arizona	KVOA	1982	1993	
Orlando	Florida	WESH	1984	1993	
Des Moines	Iowa	KCCI	1983	1993	
Meridian	Mississippi	WTOK-TV	1981	1984	
Nashville	Tennessee	WTVF	1975	1994	
Beaumont–Port Arthur–Orange	Texas	KBMT	1970	1977	
Houston	Texas	KPRC **	1925	1993	
Houston	Texas	KPRC-FM **	1946	1958	
Houston	Texas	KPRC-TV **	1950	1994	
San Antonio	Texas	KSAT-TV	1986	1994	

== The Eyes of Texas ==
Produced by flagship station KPRC-TV, H&C maintained the rights to The Eyes of Texas and was the syndicator of the program to stations across the state of Texas.
