= WNPX-TV =

Television station in Franklin, Tennessee

- Franklin–Nashville, Tennessee; United States
- City: Franklin, Tennessee (Note: Originally licensed to Cookeville, Tennessee; moved to Franklin in 2019.)
- Channels: Digital: 32 (UHF); Virtual: 28
- Branding: The Spot – Nashville 28

Programming
- Affiliations: 28.1: Independent; for others, see § Subchannels

Ownership
- Owner: E. W. Scripps Company; (Ion Media License Company, LLC)
- Sister stations: WTVF

History
- Founded: July 28, 1986
- First air date: January 23, 1989
- Former call signs: WMTT (1989–1993); WKZX (1993–1998)
- Former channel numbers: Analog: 28 (UHF, 1989–2009); Digital: 36 (UHF, 2009–2019)
- Former affiliations: Independent (1989–1995); The WB (1995–1998); Pax/i/Ion (1998–2026)
- Call sign meaning: "Nashville Pax" (former affiliation)

Technical information
- Licensing authority: FCC
- Facility ID: 28468
- ERP: 550 kW
- HAAT: 364.8 m (1,197 ft)
- Transmitter coordinates: 36°31′36″N 86°41′14″W

Links
- Public license information: Public file; LMS
- Website: www.thespottv.com/nashville-28

WNPX-TV (channel 28), branded as The Spot – Nashville 28, is an independent television station licensed to Franklin, Tennessee, United States, serving the Nashville area. It is owned by the E. W. Scripps Company alongside CBS affiliate WTVF (channel 5). The two stations share studios on James Robertson Parkway in downtown Nashville; WNPX-TV's transmitter is located near Cross Plains, Tennessee.

On June 29, 2026, the station switched from Ion Television to being an independent station, headlined by its acquisition of regional rights to the National Hockey League's Nashville Predators, and later announced as the new home to sister WTVF's newscasts and public affairs programs from NewsChannel 5+. The Ion affiliation in Nashville was then moved to WTVF-DT2.

== History ==
=== As an independent station ===
The station was signed on by Dove Broadcasting on January 23, 1989, as WMTT, an independent station serving Cookeville. On March 17, 1989, it was sold to Steven J. Sweeney. The station would sign on with a general-entertainment format featuring cartoons, sitcoms, movies, religious programming, and infomercials. InaVision Broadcasting purchased WMTT in 1993, and changed its call sign to WKZX that year.

=== As a WB affiliate ===
WKZX became a charter affiliate of The WB in 1995, and would later share the WB affiliation with WNAB (channel 58), which also served Nashville and was signed on two months later. The network also aired on cable via the superstation feed of Chicago-based WGN-TV, later branded WGN America. In 1995, WKZX launched a nightly newscast at 6:30 p.m. (and repeated at 10 p.m.) branded as News 28. In 1997, InaVision Broadcasting sold the station to Roberts Broadcasting, a company based in St. Louis.

=== As a Pax/Ion O&O ===
In 1998, Roberts Broadcasting sold WKZX to Paxson Communications, who shut down the station's news operation. Paxson also moved and upgraded WKZX's transmitter to begin focusing the channel on the Nashville market. The station's call sign was changed to WNPX-TV. On August 31, the station ended its affiliation with The WB and began airing programming from the then-new upstart television network Pax TV, the forerunner of Ion Television.

The WB would continue airing on WNAB along with the cable superstation feed of WGN. However, a year later, on January 27, 1999, network co-owners Time Warner and Tribune mutually agreed that as of September, they would cease the stopgap WB programming relay over the WGN superstation feed. As a result, WNAB became the sole WB affiliate in the Nashville market.

Sometime in 2019, WNPX's city of license was changed from Cookeville to Franklin.

=== Sale to Scripps ===
On September 24, 2020, the Cincinnati-based E. W. Scripps Company announced that it would purchase Ion Media for $2.65 billion with financing from Berkshire Hathaway. With this purchase, Scripps divested 23 Ion-owned stations, but no announcement was made at the time as to which stations would be divested as part of the move. The proposed divestitures allowed the merged company to fully comply with the FCC local and national ownership regulations. Scripps agreed to a transaction with an unnamed buyer, who has agreed to maintain Ion affiliations for the stations. (The buyer was revealed in an October 2020 FCC filing to be Inyo Broadcast Holdings). It was also stated that Scripps decided to keep WNPX-TV, making it a sister station to CBS affiliate WTVF (channel 5), pending approval by the FCC. The transaction was finalized and closed on January 7, 2021.

It was later announced on January 14, 2021, that E. W. Scripps Company would cease operations of Qubo, Ion Plus and Ion Shop on February 28, 2021, as it was reported that they would move their Katz Broadcasting networks (which include Bounce TV, Court TV, Ion Mystery, Grit and Laff) to the former Ion Media owned-and-operated stations, but will still retain Ion as their main affiliation. On February 27 at 5 a.m., the station transitioned the second, third and fourth subchannels, with Court TV replacing Qubo on channel 28.2, Grit replacing Ion Plus on channel 28.3, and Laff replacing Ion Shop on 28.4. Laff continued to air on sister station WTVF channel 5.3, but was replaced with Bounce TV on September 1. WKRN-TV would replace Bounce TV with SportsGrid on channel 2.2 and Grit with Rewind TV on channel 2.4 at the same time.

On March 2, the E. W. Scripps Company announced plans to add two new networks to its digital broadcast portfolio (joining its six existing networks). Defy and TrueReal (the latter had initially been billed as Doozy), which will respectively target men and women in the 25-54 age range with factual lifestyle and reality programming, was announced to launch on several E. W. Scripps owned-and-operated stations. There was previous speculation that the two new networks would launch on WNPX, replacing both HSN and QVC on the fifth and sixth subchannels, as this was officially confirmed on June 22, 2021. On June 30, 2021, WNPX-TV replaced both QVC and HSN with previews of both Defy TV and TrueReal, previewing the programming to launch on both networks. Both networks officially launched on July 1, 2021. The station launched an eighth subchannel to return HSN to the area in May 2022; QVC followed suit on a ninth subchannel in August.

WNPX aired the entire Ion schedule, and since the repeal of the Main Studio Rule, it carried the network without any local content outside of an hourly on-screen station identification.

=== Return to independence as "The Spot" ===
On April 7, 2026, the Nashville Predators of the National Hockey League announced that Scripps Sports had acquired the regional rights to the team beginning in the 2026–27 NHL season, with games primarily airing on WNPX and a subscription-based direct-to-consumer service to be announced. Scripps concurrently announced that WNPX would become an independent station under the branding "The Spot - Nashville 28" later in the year. WNPX is also the new home of WTVF's original public affairs programming that has previously been produced for "NewsChannel 5+" (WTVF-DT2).

== Technical information ==
=== Subchannels ===
The station's signal is multiplexed:

Subchannels of WNPX-TV
Subchannel	Res.	Short name	Programming
28.1	720p	WNPX	Main WNPX-TV programming
28.2	480i	CourtTV	Court TV
28.3	480i	Grit	Grit
28.4	480i	Laff	Laff
28.5	480i	Outlaw	Outlaw
28.6	480i	BUSTED	Busted
28.7	480i	GameSho	Game Show Central
28.8	480i	HSN	HSN
28.9	480i	QVC	QVC

Subchannel broadcast with MPEG-4 video

=== Analog-to-digital conversion ===
WNPX-TV ended regular programming on its analog signal, over UHF channel 28, on June 12, 2009, the official date on which full-power television stations in the United States were federally mandated to transition from analog to digital broadcasts. The station's digital signal remained on its pre-transition UHF channel 36, using virtual channel 28.

=== Spectrum incentive auction results ===
In the summer of 2017, as a result of its participation in the FCC's 2016–17 incentive auction, WNPX filed for a construction permit for its digital signal to relocate to UHF channel 32. On October 18, 2019, WNPX moved to channel 32 due to spectrum repacking. CBS affiliate WTVF moved its digital signal allocation to WNPX's former allocation.

=== Former translator ===
Until 2015, the station also utilized an analog translator, WNPX-LP on channel 20, located at Whites Creek. The translator was sold to Daystar on March 26, 2015.
