= Hope Hines =

American sportscaster

Hope Hines is the former sports director at WTVF in Nashville, Tennessee.

== Career ==
Following his graduation with a Bachelor of Arts in journalism (A.B.J.) from the Henry W. Grady College of Journalism and Mass Communication at the University of Georgia, Hines joined WLAC-TV (now WTVF) of Nashville, Tennessee as sports director in 1971.

Beginning in 1975, Hines was sports director of KFMB-TV in San Diego, California. There, he also served as the play-by-play radio broadcaster for the NFL's San Diego Chargers for the 1976 season. For a time, Hines worked for WWL-TV in New Orleans, and served as the television play-by-play announcer for the New Orleans Saints in 1977. Hines then spent a short stint in Charlotte, North Carolina, where he worked for Ted Turner at WRET (now WCNC-TV). Next, Hines worked in Baltimore, where he was the television play-by-play announcer for the Baltimore Colts, and 5:30 p.m. sports anchor for WMAR-TV.

In 1983, Hines returned to WTVF in Nashville, Tennessee as sports director. He remained in this position until his retirement in July 2011. His memoir, In Hines' Sight, was published shortly thereafter. For a time following his retirement from television, Hines produced a 60-second weekday sports commentary and profile segment for Nashville radio station WGFX 104.5 The Zone.

Hines won six broadcast Emmy Awards. He was also named Best Sportscaster in the Southeast. He was named a recipient of the Silver Circle Award by the National Academy of Television Arts and Sciences for 25 Years of Distinguished Service to the Industry. In 2014, he was inducted into the Tennessee Sports Hall of Fame.

== Private life ==
Hines and his wife Pat have three grown children and seven grandchildren.
