= Graham Media Group =

American television broadcast company

- Formerly: WTOP Inc. (1949–1954); Post Stations (1954–1961); Post-Newsweek Stations (1961–2014)
- Type: Subsidiary
- Industry: Broadcast television
- Founded: 1949; 77 years ago
- Headquarters: Detroit, Michigan, U.S.
- Area served: United States; Canada
- Key people: Catherine Badalamente (president and CEO)
- Parent: Graham Holdings Company
- Website: www.grahammedia.com

Graham Media Group (formerly Post-Newsweek Stations) is the television broadcasting subsidiary of Graham Holdings Company. It is now headquartered in Detroit, co-locating with its local NBC affiliate WDIV-TV, after spending 10 years in Chicago.

== History ==
Previous logo as Post-Newsweek Stations

The origins of Graham Media can be traced to 1944, when The Washington Post began its broadcasting activities with its purchase of WINX radio in Washington, D.C. Four years later the newspaper's parent firm, the Washington Post Company, announced its intention to acquire controlling interest in a rival station, WTOP radio from CBS. The two firms formed a joint venture known as WTOP Incorporated, with the Post holding 55 percent and CBS maintaining the balance (45 percent). The Post sold wholly owned WINX but retained its FM adjunct WINX-FM, which became the original WTOP-FM when the sales became final in 1949. In 1950 WTOP Inc. purchased WOIC, Washington's CBS television affiliate, and changed that station's call letters to WTOP-TV. This Post-CBS joint venture is the direct predecessor of Graham Media Group.

CBS was forced by the Federal Communications Commission to sell its remaining interest in WTOP Inc. in 1954. The Post then merged its Washington stations with recently purchased WMBR-AM-TV in Jacksonville, Florida and changed the company's name to Post Stations, Inc. WMBR radio was later sold off (it is now WQOP); the Post then changed WMBR-TV's calls to WJXT. The company was rechristened as Post-Newsweek Stations, Inc. after the Post acquired Newsweek magazine in 1961. From 1961 to 1962, Post-Newsweek held 46% ownership with KOGO, KOGO-FM and KOGO-TV in San Diego with the investment firm of Fox, Wells & Rogers owning 54%. Post-Newsweek declined to acquire full ownership of the stations and the venture ended when the outlets were sold to the broadcasting division of Time-Life in 1962.

Post-Newsweek made its first purchase in 1969, with the acquisitions of WCKY radio in Cincinnati and WLBW-TV in Miami; the TV outlet was renamed WPLG after the former Washington Post publisher Philip Graham, who committed suicide in 1963. WTOP-FM in Washington was donated to Howard University in 1971 and became WHUR-FM soon after. In 1974, the company added WTIC-TV in Hartford, Connecticut, changing its calls to WFSB upon taking over.

In the wake of a panic swap of WTOP-TV (now WUSA) to the (Detroit) Evening News Association for its WWJ-TV (now WDIV) in 1978, followed by the sale of both radio stations later in the year, the Post decided to spin off their broadcasting interests into a company of its own. The Post-Newsweek name itself would later spread to the Post-owned cable operations (now known as Cable One and a company identical in structure to Post-Newsweek Stations). During the 1970s and 1980s, the stations tended to have vaguely similar on-air looks, along with the common slogan "The One & Only Channel/TV (number)"; some of the stations continue to use this or a variant as a slogan.

In 1992, Post-Newsweek bought the now-defunct Detroit regional sports station PASS Sports from former Detroit Tigers owner and Domino's Pizza founder Tom Monaghan. On April 22, 1994, the Texas stations of H&C Communications, KPRC-TV in Houston and KSAT-TV in San Antonio were acquired. Around the time, Post-Newsweek Television, the production unit of the station sold the rights of Inside Washington to Gannett. Three years later, the company traded WFSB to Meredith Corporation in exchange for WCPX-TV in Orlando, Florida. In keeping with tradition of renaming stations after notable people within the Post family, WCPX became WKMG-TV in honor of Katharine Graham.

Post-Newsweek nearly expanded to seven stations in 2008, when it offered to purchase NBC-owned WTVJ, creating a duopoly with WPLG. The sale was cancelled however, due to lack of FCC approval and poor economic conditions at that time, along with local reaction against media consolidation.

=== 2013–present: The post-Post-Newsweek era ===
The Post-Newsweek Stations group was not involved in the sales of Newsweek to Sidney Harman in August 2010, and of the Washington Post to Jeff Bezos in October 2013, after which the Washington Post Company was renamed Graham Holdings Company. Graham's station group continued to operate under the Post-Newsweek name until July 28, 2014, when it was announced that it would be renamed Graham Media Group.

In March 2014, Graham announced that it would sell WPLG to Berkshire Hathaway, in exchange for a large majority of Berkshire Hathaway's shares in Graham Holdings. Berkshire Hathaway and its chairman, Warren Buffett, had been longtime stockholders in the company. The acquisition closed on June 30, 2014; Berkshire Hathaway entered into agreements with Graham to continue providing WPLG with the station group's centralized services following the sale.

On May 27, 2016, Graham announced that as part of the acquisition of Media General by Nexstar Broadcasting Group, it would acquire Nexstar's The CW affiliate WCWJ in Jacksonville (forming Graham's first-ever duopoly, with WJXT) and Media General's NBC affiliate WSLS-TV in Roanoke, Virginia, in divestitures tied to the sale.

== Stations ==
Stations are arranged in alphabetical order by state and city of license.

=== Current stations ===
Media market	State	Station	Purchased	Affiliation
Jacksonville	Florida	WJXT	1953	Independent
Jacksonville	Florida	WCWJ	2017	The CW
Orlando–Daytona Beach–Melbourne	Florida	WKMG-TV	1997	CBS
Detroit	Michigan	WDIV-TV	1978	NBC
Houston	Texas	KPRC-TV	1994	NBC
San Antonio	Texas	KSAT-TV	1994	ABC
Roanoke–Lynchburg	Virginia	WSLS-TV	2017	NBC

=== Former stations ===
Media market	State/Dist.	Station	Purchased	Sold	Notes
San Diego	California	KOGO-TV	1961	1962	(Note: Co-owned with Fox, Wells & Rogers from 1961 to 1962 in a joint venture; 54% owned by Fox, Wells & Rogers, 46% owned by Post-Newsweek.) (Note: Known as KFSD-TV prior to 1961.)
Hartford–New Haven	Connecticut	WFSB	1974	1997	
Washington, D.C.	District of Columbia	WTOP	1949	1978	(Note: Co-owned with CBS until 1954 in a joint venture; 55% owned by the Post, 45% owned by CBS.)
Washington, D.C.	District of Columbia	WTOP-FM	1949	1971	
Washington, D.C.	District of Columbia	WTOP-TV	1950	1978	
Jacksonville	Florida	WMBR	1953	1958	
Miami–Fort Lauderdale	Florida	WPLG	1969	2014	
Cincinnati	Ohio	WCKY	1969	1976	
