= KPRC-TV =

Television station in Houston

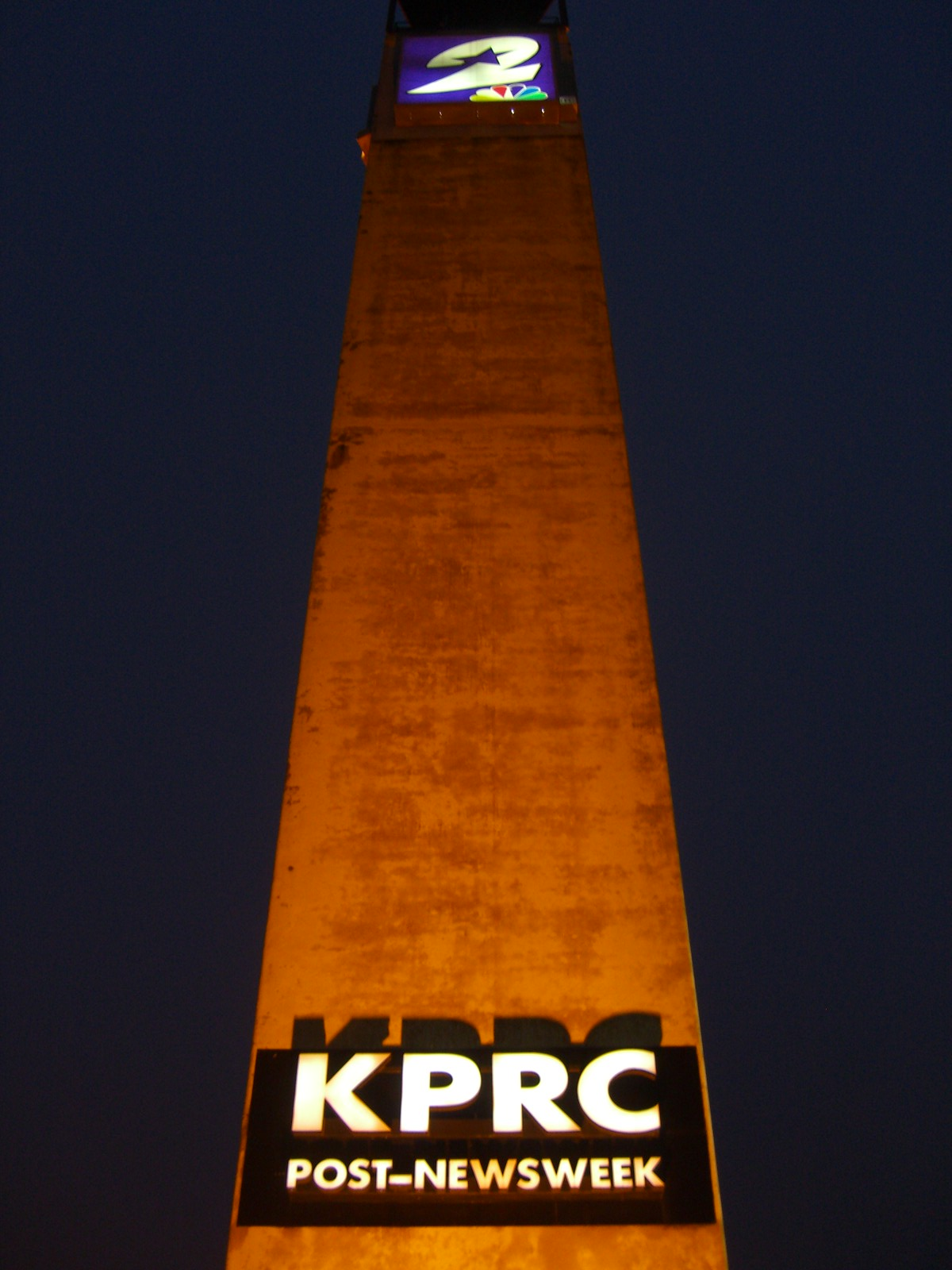
- KPRC STL tower off Interstate 69/U.S. Route 59 in the Greater Sharpstown area of Houston
- Houston, Texas; United States
- Channels: Digital: 35 (UHF); Virtual: 2
- Branding: KPRC 2

Programming
- Affiliations: 2.1: NBC; for others, see § Subchannels

Ownership
- Owner: Graham Media Group; (Graham Media Group, Houston, Inc.)

History
- First air date: January 1, 1949
- Former call signs: KLEE-TV (1949–1950)
- Former channel number: Analog: 2 (VHF, 1949–2009)
- Former affiliations: All secondary: CBS (1949–1953); ABC (1949–1954); DuMont (1949–1955)
- Call sign meaning: K(C)otton Port Rail Center (carried over from KPRC radio)

Technical information
- Licensing authority: FCC
- Facility ID: 53117
- ERP: 1,000 kW
- HAAT: 585 m (1,919 ft)
- Transmitter coordinates: 29°34′6″N 95°29′57″W

Links
- Public license information: Public file; LMS
- Website: www.click2houston.com

KPRC-TV (channel 2) is a television station in Houston, Texas, United States, affiliated with NBC and owned by Graham Media Group. Its studios are located on Southwest Freeway (I-69/US 59) in the Southwest Management District (formerly Greater Sharpstown), and its transmitter is located near Missouri City, in unincorporated northeastern Fort Bend County. Houston is the largest television market in the United States where the NBC station is not owned and operated by the network.

== History ==
The station first signed on the air on January 1, 1949, as KLEE-TV. It was Houston's first television station and the second one to sign on in Texas, three months behind Fort Worth station WBAP-TV and over eight months ahead of Dallas station KBTV. KLEE-TV was owned by hotelier W. Albert Lee along with KLEE (610 AM), and carried programming from all four networks of the day—NBC, CBS, ABC, and DuMont. After a year of difficulty, Lee sold the station to the Hobby family, owners of the Houston Post and Houston's oldest radio station, KPRC (950 AM) and KPRC-FM 99.7. The Hobby family took control on June 1, 1950, and changed the television station's call sign to match its radio stations on July 3. Although it appears that the call letters stand for "Post-Dispatch Radio Company", they actually stand for "K(C)otton Port Rail Center", a nod to Houston's role in the cotton trade.

After the Hobbys took over, channel 2 became a primary NBC affiliate due to KPRC radio's longstanding affiliation with the NBC Radio Network. Due to the Federal Communications Commission (FCC)–imposed freeze on new station licenses, channel 2 remained the only television station in Houston for four more years. CBS moved its affiliation to KGUL-TV (channel 11, now KHOU) in 1953 and KTRK-TV (channel 13) took over the ABC affiliation when it signed on one year later. DuMont ceased operations in 1956, though it was briefly affiliated with now-defunct KNUZ-TV (channel 39). Because of its affiliation with NBC, KPRC-TV was the first station in Houston to broadcast a program in color and was subsequently the first to broadcast its entire schedule in color.

In March 1953, the station operated its first permanent studio located on 3014 Post Oak Road, which later became the Lakes on Post Oak near the Galleria shopping complex in Uptown Houston. The studio building was along the street frontage, while the KPRC radio transmitter site was in the rear of the lot. The station became the source of controversy after some television viewers in the United Kingdom claimed to receive the signal of KLEE-TV on September 14, 1953, three years after the station abandoned those call letters. However, this was actually a hoax. Over the years, the Hobby family bought several other television stations, including KVOA-TV in Tucson, KCCI in Des Moines, WTVF in Nashville, WESH in Daytona Beach, and KSAT-TV in San Antonio.

In March 1972, KPRC-TV moved into a new state-of-the-art studio facility in the Sharpstown area (then part of unincorporated Harris County) where it operated from for 45 years. Built on property originally lent to Houston Baptist University, KPRC-TV chose the site to build its new facilities in large part due to its location on the feeder road of the Southwest Freeway. The building housed three studios which were suspended from the ground to reduce vibration, and when viewed from space via satellite map, the building resembled a film camera.

In October 1983, the Hobbys sold the Houston Post to the Toronto Sun, while the family's broadcast holdings were reorganized as H&C Communications, with KPRC-AM-TV remaining as the flagship stations (KPRC-FM had been sold in 1958). After 40 years under Hobby family ownership, KPRC-TV was sold to The Washington Post Company on April 22, 1994; an attempt to sell the station to Young Broadcasting in 1992 was unsuccessful. (The Houston Post was then bought by the Hearst Corporation and absorbed into its Houston Chronicle, with the last edition printed on April 18, 1995.) On September 20, 2004, KPRC-TV was rebranded "Local 2". In January 2015, KPRC-TV dropped the "Local" and began simply calling itself "Channel 2".

KPRC-TV's original "Lone Star 2" logo, used from late 1994 to September 19, 2004: The current logo (shown in the infobox) is very similar to the original, but is enhanced for HD

In December 2015, KPRC-TV broke ground on a new studio, behind the old studio in the employee parking lot, on the same Sharpstown site. While the old studio was 90,000 square feet (8,361 m^{2}), the new studio would have only 65,000 square feet (6,039 m^{2}). The new studios were dedicated in April 2016, and the previous 45-year-old studios were demolished.

Since October 1994, KPRC-TV has used the familiar "Lone Star 2" logo, which was modified in 2004 for HD. The "two" in KPRC-TV's current logo is vertically parallelogrammed and similar to former logos used by KCBS-TV in Los Angeles (1994) and WMAR-TV in Baltimore (1998) but with the CBS and ABC logos (respectively) in place of the NBC one; neither logo uses the Texas star.

The film and video archives of KPRC have been partially digitized by the Texas Archive of the Moving Image and approximately 250 clips can be viewed on their website.

== Programming ==
Since its inception KPRC-TV has been an NBC affiliate, and in part because of NBC's affiliation the station was the first in Houston to broadcast in color.

From 1969 to 1998, KPRC-TV produced the longest-running syndicated television program in Texas, The Eyes of Texas, a lifestyle program which focused on segments relating to Texas culture and life (the program continues to air locally on PBS member station KUHT, channel 8). KPRC-TV was also one of the first stations to air telethons, raising $28,000 for the American Cancer Society in 1950. It carried the MDA Labor Day Telethon every Labor Day from 1970 to 2012 (KPRC's status as an MDA "Love Network" affiliate ended in 2013, when the telethon discontinued its syndicated distribution model and moved to ABC as a short-form program rebranded as the MDA Show of Strength, where it aired locally on KTRK-TV until the program ended after 2014).

Historically, KPRC-TV was the original Houston affiliate for the nighttime syndicated editions of Wheel of Fortune and Jeopardy!, both of which had their roots as NBC daytime game shows, from their respective 1983 and 1984 debuts until the game shows moved to rival KHOU in 1986. (The latter was picked up by KTRK in 2015.) From 1986 to 1993, KPRC-TV filled Wheel's 6:30 p.m. slot with various syndicated revivals of Hollywood Squares, Family Feud and You Bet Your Life before settling on Entertainment Tonight in 1993. The station also gained a reputation from the 1980s well into the early 2000s for airing various syndicated tabloid talk shows that often fit the pejorative definition of "Trash TV". Indeed, KPRC-TV was the original Houston affiliate for Geraldo, which the station carried from its 1987 debut until complaints from viewers and even station management over its content led KPRC-TV to drop the show in 1990 (Geraldo moved to KTXH, then later to KTRK). After Post-Newsweek acquired the station, KPRC-TV nonetheless began broadcasting more syndicated talk shows in the afternoon including ones hosted by Montel Williams, Maury Povich, Jenny Jones, Ricki Lake and Jerry Springer, as well as infotainment news programs such as A Current Affair, Hard Copy, Extra, Access Hollywood and Inside Edition. Many of these shows eventually moved to other stations due to ratings declines and the overexposure of their genres, as well as the gradual expansion of NBC's Today (which KPRC-TV has historically aired in its entirety) from two to three hours in 1999, and eventually four hours by 2007.

On August 23, 2016, KPRC-TV began airing a daily lifestyle and entertainment program called Houston Life and featured Jennifer Broome and Derrick Shore as hosts. Houston Life focuses on lifestyle and feature segments in and around Houston. This resulted in KPRC-TV bumping the long-running NBC soap opera Days of Our Lives from its network-recommended 1 pm. Central Time slot to 2 pm, where it replaced the canceled Meredith Vieira Show. Broome was replaced by former KPRC reporter and weekend anchor Courtney Zavala in 2018; Zavala departed KPRC in 2023 and was replaced by Tessa Barrera who also co-hosts The Rod Ryan Show on KTBZ-FM.

=== Network preemptions ===
While KPRC-TV generally airs NBC's programming lineup in pattern, this has not always been the case. Despite NBC historically being less tolerant of preemptions than other networks, KPRC-TV has at times preempted programming particularly in late night and daytime hours. While NBC has become more tolerant of preemptions than in previous years, it prefers that its affiliates clear the entire schedule whenever possible.

Following its acquisition by Post-Newsweek, various programs have been preempted by KPRC-TV over the years in a pattern similar to that of its Detroit sister station, WDIV-TV. Most notorious of all, the station dropped Late Night with Conan O'Brien from 1994 to 1996, leaving Houston as the largest market in the country to not air the program, with reruns of various tabloid talk shows including the aforementioned Ricki Lake and Jenny Jones, tabloid news programs such as Entertainment Tonight and Access Hollywood, and even a repeat of KPRC-TV's 10 p.m. newscast often filling the void. While Late Night did return to KPRC-TV in 1996, the station continued to delay its broadcast as far back as 2:40 a.m. (even truncating the broadcast of its overnight news program, NBC Nightside, in the process).

This fact was not lost on O'Brien, who visited Houston (making impromptu stops at Houston's central bus terminal and the Astrodome) to watch an episode of his own show with Houstonians in a classic remote piece. KPRC-TV's mail servers were flooded with emails from O'Brien's fans in response. KPRC-TV responded by moving the show to 12:35 a.m. in 1998, and finally to its network-recommended (for the Central Time Zone) 11:35 p.m. slot in 2005, where Late Night, now hosted by Seth Meyers, continues to air. Channel 2 also delayed A Little Late with Lilly Singh (and its predecessor, Last Call with Carson Daly) in late nights (recently at 1:35 a.m.) until August 13, 2021, when NBC gave that timeslot back to its affiliates; the station now airs a rebroadcast of the 10 p.m. news at 12:37 a.m.

When Passions debuted on NBC in 1999, KPRC-TV (along with Detroit sister station WDIV-TV) were the only NBC affiliates that preempted the soap opera until 2002, even though Passions' predecessor Another World was cleared by KPRC for most if not all of its entire run. Around this time, KPRC, WDIV and Bonneville International–owned NBC affiliate KSL-TV in Salt Lake City declined to air Sunset Beach; in Houston, Sunset Beach aired on KTXH (channel 20). KNWS-TV (channel 51, now KYAZ), which had also picked up another preempted NBC daytime program, the talk show Leeza during the late 1990s, would pick up Passions in 2001 before the program moved to KPRC-TV in 2002 at 3:05 a.m. Following the expansion of Today to three hours in 1999, Maury (which previously filled the 9 a.m. hour) aired in place of Passions until KPRC-TV placed the latter program in its network-recommended 2 p.m. timeslot in August 2004 (with Maury moving to KHWB [channel 39, now KIAH] at the same time), where it remained until its cancellation in September 2007.

During the 2000s, KPRC-TV was also among a handful of NBC affiliates that did not air Poker After Dark during its entire run, and likewise did not carry the short-lived Face the Ace in August 2009 (along with WDIV and Milwaukee's WTMJ-TV), preempting both prime time airings with St. Jude Children's Research Hospital fundraising programs. As is the case with Detroit's WDIV, NBC's current overnight lineup (a rebroadcast of the fourth hour of Today on weekdays; LXTV 1st Look and Open House NYC on weekends) also does not air in Houston.

=== Sports programming ===
Beginning in 1965, the American Football League signed a broadcast deal with NBC. As a result, KPRC-TV became the primary station for regular season games of the Houston Oilers, one of the league's eight founding teams; this continued after the AFL became the American Football Conference of the National Football League in 1970. Local Oilers broadcasts ended after the 1996 NFL season, when the team relocated to Nashville and eventually became the Tennessee Titans, though Oilers games would continue to be prioritized for broadcast during the 1997 season, which also turned out to be the last for NBC as the primary broadcaster of Sunday afternoon AFC games. During the team's final years in Houston, the Oilers failed to sell out many home games, subjecting them to in-market television blackouts under league rules at the time in addition to preemption from radio broadcasts locally.

Since 2006, the station is also involved with Houston's current NFL team, the Texans (who began play in 2002), in that the station airs games when they are featured on NBC's Sunday Night Football, as well as broadcasting a Sunday morning pregame show during the season on Sunday afternoon game days.

In addition to Oilers/Texans games, KPRC-TV has aired Houston Astros games via NBC's broadcast contract with Major League Baseball from 1962 to 1989, a role it resumed in 2026 as the local station for Sunday Night Baseball. KPRC-TV also served as the team's over-the-air flagship station from 1973 to 1978. Channel 2 also aired Houston Rockets games via NBC's broadcast contract with the NBA from 1990 to 2002 and since 2025. This includes the team's championship victories in 1994 and 1995.

However, KPRC-TV has been known for motorsports preemptions. In 2001, a contract with the Miss Texas Scholarship Pageant (which predated NBC's acquisition of partial NASCAR broadcast rights) did not allow for the program to be rescheduled, resulting in the preemption of the Firecracker 400, then televised on NBC under an alternating basis with Fox (which in return carried the Daytona 500 held at the same track). In 2013, KPRC also preempted coverage of NBC's inaugural Formula 1 telecast of the 2013 Monaco Grand Prix (which aired locally at 6:30 a.m. due to time differences between the U.S. and Monaco) with infomercials and local news. That incident led to Fox owned-and-operated station KRIV posting on social media that they would air that year's Coca-Cola 600 live with the tag, "We've been promoting the race as live, and we'll show it live."

In September 2007, the first half-hour of the NFL Kickoff game between the New Orleans Saints and the Indianapolis Colts was shown on KPRC-TV with default audio in Spanish rather than English. KPRC inadvertently aired the secondary audio program feed provided by Telemundo (owned by NBC parent company NBCUniversal).

=== News operation ===
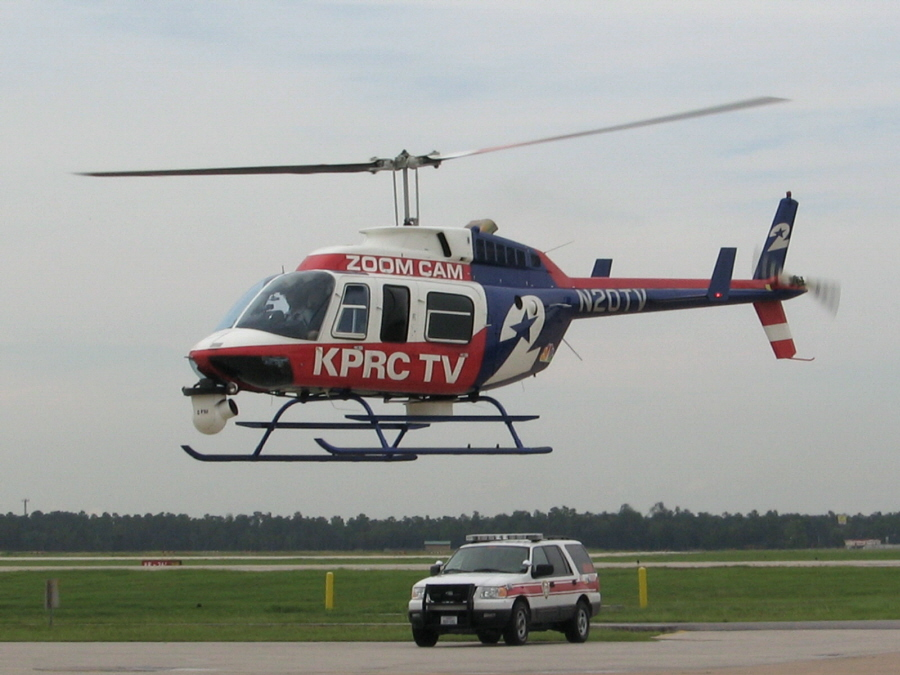
Chopper 2 departing George Bush Intercontinental Airport

KPRC-TV presently broadcasts 43 hours, 25 minutes of locally produced newscasts each week (with 7 hours, 5 minutes each weekday; 4 1/2 hours on Saturdays and 3 1/2 hours on Sundays). The station also carries Sports Sunday, which has been a staple of the station since its days as a locally owned station in the 1980s, at 10:20 p.m. following its late Sunday newscast, as well as Houston Newsmakers (a local Sunday morning talk show similar in format to NBC's Meet the Press) at 10:30 a.m.

As a station with roots in a newspaper, KPRC-TV has long been a very news-intensive station, and it is known for its innovation in television journalism. In its early years under the stewardship of news director Ray Miller, KPRC-TV often led the local news ratings with notable personalities such as Miller and fellow anchors Steve Smith and Larry Rasco. KPRC-TV was the first station in Houston to use weather radar for its weather reports, to use videotape for field reporting, to have a fully staffed news bureau in Austin, to hire female and African American reporters, and to hire a Hispanic news anchor for an English-language newscast. The station's first female anchor was Sara Lowrey, who co-anchored the 6 p.m. news with Rasco.

In 1973, after Smith departed for KDKA-TV in Pittsburgh (at the time, a larger market than Houston), the station hired former KHOU anchor Ron Stone and paired him with weatherman Doug Johnson and sportscaster Bill Worrell (who had formerly co-anchored the news with Rasco) for its evening newscasts, then known as Big 2 News (Smith would eventually return to Houston as the lead anchor at KHOU in 1975). In addition to Stone, other news anchors for Big 2 News included Cindy Martin, former ABC News correspondent George Caldwell (Note: George Caldwell later reverted to his real name, George Sells.) and New York anchorwoman Anna Bond. Three KHOU personalities, news anchor Bob Nicholas (in 1979), along with sportscaster Ron Franklin and news anchor Bill Balleza (both in 1980) would follow Stone to KPRC-TV. On September 15, 1980, KPRC-TV rebranded their newscasts from Big 2 News (which was used since 1969) to Channel 2 News (presented on air as 2News). During this time, KTRK overtook KPRC-TV and became the dominant news station in Houston, even though KPRC-TV would continue to fare a strong second from the late 1970s well into the early 1990s as KHOU began to struggle with management and ownership issues during this period. From 1985 to 1992, the station's newscasts were branded as ChannelTwoNews, broadcasting round-the-clock news updates throughout the day, including during NBC prime time shows. For several years during the early 1990s, updates also aired during the overnight hours with producers and other newsroom personnel serving as anchors. During this time, national voiceover announcer Charlie Van Dyke served as the station's image announcer, with KPRC-TV personality Don Armstrong serving as the local promo announcer.

With anchors such as Stone, Balleza, Nicholas, Jan Carson, Linda Lorelle, and Dan O'Rourke, weathermen Johnson and Ted Shaw, and sports anchors Ron Franklin, Craig Roberts and Lisa Malosky, the station's newscasts often competed for and even placed first at times. In the fall of 1994, shortly after Post-Newsweek Stations bought KPRC-TV, its newscasts were retitled as News 2 Houston with a somewhat more tabloid presentational style (in contrast to its more traditional format under local ownership) similar to that of its Detroit sister station, WDIV-TV. Two years later, KPRC-TV constructed a new newsroom within one of its three studios, using the newsroom as a backdrop that was similar to the "newsplex" set used by Miami Fox affiliate WSVN, itself a former NBC affiliate which became a ratings leader in that market after losing its NBC affiliation and switching to a similar tabloid-style format. This set was referred to as the "News Center" and was used on-air until 2006, even though the physical newsroom continued to exist until the move to its current facilities in 2017. In addition, KPRC also added longtime WSVN voiceover Scott Chapin as promotional announcer during the late 1990s.

In 1996, KPRC-TV debuted a half-hour 4 p.m. newscast. During this time, KPRC-TV won more awards and continued to avidly compete in the ratings with KTRK as well as a resurgent KHOU, even occasionally beating KTRK at 10 p.m. on the strength of NBC's "Must See TV" programming of the 1990s. Notable personalities who rose to prominence in the News 2 Houston era included Dominique Sachse (who started as a traffic reporter before moving to an anchor role on the morning news), chief meteorologist Frank Billingsley (who left his position as KTRK's weekend meteorologist to succeed Doug Johnson as evening weather anchor), and investigative reporter Tony Kovaleski (whose reports resulted in numerous awards for the station). News anchors for KPRC in the 1990s included Brett Lea (who had anchored at KPRC-TV's former sister station under H&C Communications ownership, WTVF in Nashville), future Chicago news anchor Rob Johnson and Khambrel Marshall, a former sportscaster for KPRC's then-sister station WPLG-TV and news anchor at WCIX/WFOR-TV in Miami.

On September 20, 2004, KPRC-TV retitled its newscasts as Local 2 News, putting the station in line with its fellow Post-Newsweek stations which adopted similar branding and perhaps to avoid confusion with News 24 Houston, a 24-hour local cable news channel owned by Time Warner Cable and Belo (then-owner of KHOU) which shut down just weeks before KPRC-TV's transition was complete. However, by this time the station had gone into a period a decline both in terms of quality and ratings. At one point, KPRC-TV's 5 p.m. newscast even reportedly finished in fifth place, behind English-language newscasts on KHOU and KTRK-TV, a Spanish-language newscast on Univision station KXLN (channel 45), and even syndicated reruns of The Simpsons on Fox station KRIV (channel 26) which at one point even led all Houston newscasts airing in that timeslot. Despite a strong lead-in from Dr. Phil, KPRC-TV also continued to decline at 4 p.m. and in both the morning and evening hours as NBC's ratings began to enter a steep decline following the ending of several of its 1990s-era staples such as Friends and Frasier, with the station even dropping Dr. Phil at one point and not even clearing the show for another Houston station to pick up. KPRC-TV was also hit with a 2006 boycott by civil rights activist Quanell X and other African American leaders following the demotion of African American anchors Linda Lorelle and Khambrel Marshall from its evening broadcasts. In response to the controversy, KPRC-TV hired longtime KHOU anchor Jerome Gray, who is African American, to anchor its early evening newscasts as well as serve as a managing editor, and moved former anchor Khambrel Marshall to executive producer, with Marshall eventually moving back on-air as a weekend meteorologist and host of Houston Newsmakers.

Overall, by early 2007, KPRC-TV was in third place behind KHOU and KTRK. However, since Nielsen Media Research began using Local People Meters in the Houston market in October 2007, KPRC-TV began to see gains in most timeslots, while its competition saw declines. KPRC-TV's morning and late-evening newscasts made the most gains in 2007, competing for second place with KHOU. On July 19, 2008, during its 6 p.m. newscasts, KPRC-TV began broadcasting its local newscasts in high definition in the run up to NBC's coverage of the 2008 Summer Olympics. On August 24, 2009, KPRC-TV expanded its morning newscast to an additional half-hour at 4:30 am. By 2012, the station's 6 p.m. newscast had ratings gains, boasting its highest viewership in November and December, as well as significant increases in all other time periods; the 10 p.m. broadcast also grew, besting KTRK for first in the timeslot for several consecutive months that year. KPRC-TV retitled its newscasts back to Channel 2 News on January 26, 2015.

In January 2020, Bill Balleza retired from KPRC-TV. Two months later, Kris Gutierrez, who was previously with KPRC-TV from 2003 to 2007, rejoined KPRC-TV as Balleza's replacement. Gutierrez, in between his stints for KPRC-TV, was a Fox News Channel correspondent and an anchor for WBBM-TV in Chicago, as well as for NBC owned-and-operated station KXAS-TV in the Dallas–Fort Worth metroplex. In January 2021, KPRC-TV's newscasts were retitled as KPRC 2 News. Dominique Sachse departed from KPRC-TV on October 29, 2021. Three days later, the station announced that former KPRC reporter and weekend anchor Daniella Guzman (who had anchored at NBC owned-and-operated stations WMAQ-TV in Chicago and KNBC in Los Angeles) would succeed Sachse; Guzman returned to KPRC-TV on January 12, 2022. Gutierrez departed from KPRC-TV in February 2022 and was later succeeded (officially on June 20) by Keith Garvin, a former ABC News correspondent who had joined KPRC-TV in August 2012 as news anchor and reporter.

==== Notable current on-air staff ====
- Melanie Camp – correspondent for Houston Life (2022–present)
- Daniella Guzman – weekday anchor (was previously with KPRC-TV as a reporter and weekend anchor from 2006 to 2012)

==== Notable former on-air staff ====
- Mark Alford – reporter and weekend anchor (1995–1998)
- Gayle Anderson – "2 On Your Side" reporter/midday anchor (1986–1991)
- Dr. Charles "Chuck" Berry – House Physician for Big 2 News (1977–1980s)
- Bill Enis – sports director (1960s–1973)
- Ron Franklin – sports director (1980–1987)
- Joanne Herring – host of The Joanne King Show (1974–1979)
- Wes Hohenstein – weekday morning meteorologist (2003–2006)
- Kay Bailey Hutchison – known on-air as Kay Bailey, Channel 2's first female reporter (1967–1972)
- Tom Jarriel – worked behind the scenes in the news department as a reporter for a number of years
- Rob Johnson – (1995–1998)
- Tony Kovaleski – investigative reporter (1997–2001)
- Linda Lorelle – anchor (1989–2006)
- Lisa Malosky – sports reporter (1990s)
- Byron Miranda – meteorologist
- Sylvia Perez – reporter/anchor (?–1989)
- John Quiñones – reporter/anchor (1975–1978)
- Jacob Rascon – weekend anchor and reporter (2017–2021)
- Jacque Reid – reporter/anchor (1997–2000)
- Janet Shamlian – weekend anchor (1995–1997)
- Ron Stone – anchor (1972–1992)
- Spencer Tillman – sports reporter/anchor (1987–1997)
- Charlie Van Dyke – announcer (1982–1993)
- Bill Worrell – news anchor/sportscaster (1970–1980)
- Chris Wragge – sports director (1998–2004)
- Paula Zahn – anchor (1981–1983)
- Marvin Zindler – reporter (1950–1954)

== In popular culture ==
Screen-capture image of KPRC's building façade and STL tower, appearing as fictional station 'KVIK' from the opening sequence of former NBC soap opera Texas.

In 1958, Reader's Digest published an article on how one afternoon in 1953, a signal showing KLEE's station ID supposedly appeared on TV sets throughout England—three years after the station was sold and changed to KPRC-TV. Although quickly revealed as a hoax to sell TV sets in the UK, it remains a long-standing urban legend.

In the 1980–82 NBC soap opera Texas, which was set primarily in Houston, the series made several mentions of fictional television station "KVIK", run by one of the show's characters. A brief view of the exterior of KPRC-TV's studio facility, which was marked with a "KVIK" sign out front, can be seen during a later version of the show's opening title sequence. One episode of the series features a scene in which two characters are conversing while walking down a second-floor hallway at "KVIK" (which was filmed at the KPRC building) that overlooks the first-floor lobby.

== Technical information ==
KPRC-DT3 logo during its LATV affiliation

=== Subchannels ===
The station's signal is multiplexed:

Subchannels of KPRC-TV
Subchannel	Res.	Short name	Programming
2.1	1080i	KPRC-HD	NBC
2.2	480i	StartTV	Start TV
2.3	480i	H&I	Heroes & Icons
2.4	480i	2 Plus	2 Plus
2.5	480i	KPRC2-5	[Blank]
39.1	1080i	KIAH-DT	The CW (KIAH)

Broadcast on behalf of another station

KPRC-TV had carried This TV from the start of 2009 until May 28, 2018, on its second subchannel, being one of the network's longest-tenured affiliates before leaving This TV on that day. KPRC-DT2 then became the new home of MeTV in the Houston market, taking over that role from KUBE-TV 57.4. (This TV moved to the newly created 57.7 and Cozi TV swapped to 57.4). On March 29, 2021, MeTV moved to KYAZ channel 51.1. KYAZ was acquired by Weigel Broadcasting in December 2020 and became a MeTV owned-and-operated station; Start TV was moved from KPRC-DT4 to KPRC-DT2. Later that year, KPRC-DT4 was reactivated with Dabl as its affiliation and remained until January 12, 2025, when it moved to the third digital subchannel of KYAZ (replacing a simulcast of MeTV Plus). KPRC resumed carrying MeTV (via a simulcast of KYAZ) on its fourth digital subchannel until January 8, 2026, when it was reformatted into an independent station branded as "2 Plus".

=== Analog-to-digital conversion ===
KPRC-TV ended regular programming on its analog signal, over VHF channel 2, on June 12, 2009, as part of the federally mandated transition from analog to digital television. The station's digital signal remained on its pre-transition UHF channel 35, using virtual channel 2. On that date, tropospheric ducting resulted in KPRC-TV's digital signal being receivable as far away as Alexandria, Louisiana, where KPRC-TV virtual channel 2.1 was seen in place of KALB-TV's virtual channel 5.1 on digital receivers (both stations transmit their digital signals on UHF channel 35).

As part of the SAFER Act, KPRC kept its analog signal on the air until July 12 to inform viewers of the digital television transition through a loop of public service announcements from the National Association of Broadcasters.

Prior to the digital transition, KPRC-TV was the only Houston station on the VHF dial whose cable channel position did not match its over-the-air analog channel. Due to interference from the low-band VHF terrestrial signal, Comcast Xfinity carried KPRC-TV in analog SD on channel 12. It is carried on digital HD on channels 612 and 1002. Other cable systems on the outer edges of the Houston media market carry KPRC-TV on cable channel 2. It is also available on cable in Lufkin–Nacogdoches and Bryan–College Station.
