= WTVF =

Television station in Nashville, Tennessee

- Nashville, Tennessee; United States
- Channels: Digital: 36 (UHF); Virtual: 5
- Branding: NewsChannel 5

Programming
- Affiliations: 5.1: CBS; for others, see § Subchannels

Ownership
- Owner: E. W. Scripps Company; (Scripps Broadcasting Holdings LLC)
- Sister stations: WNPX-TV

History
- First air date: August 6, 1954
- Former call signs: WLAC-TV (1954–1975)
- Former channel numbers: Analog: 5 (VHF, 1954–2009); Digital: 56 (UHF, 2001–2009), 5 (VHF, 2009–2012), 25 (UHF, 2012–2019)
- Call sign meaning: Television Five

Technical information
- Licensing authority: FCC
- Facility ID: 36504
- ERP: 1,000 kW
- HAAT: 431 m (1,414 ft)
- Transmitter coordinates: 36°16′5″N 86°47′16″W
- Translator(s): 5 (VHF) Nashville

Links
- Public license information: Public file; LMS
- Website: www.newschannel5.com

WTVF (channel 5) is a television station in Nashville, Tennessee, United States, affiliated with CBS. Its secondary digital subchannel serves as an owned-and-operated station of Ion Television. Owned by the E. W. Scripps Company alongside independent station WNPX-TV (channel 28), the two stations share studios on James Robertson Parkway in downtown Nashville; WTVF's transmitter is located north of downtown along I-24 near Whites Creek.

== History ==
WTVF first signed on the air August 6, 1954, as WLAC-TV, originally owned by the Life and Casualty Insurance Company, and Nashville businessmen Guilford Dudley, Al Beaman and Thomas Baker. Life and Casualty's chairman of the board Paul Mountcastle and his investment group also held controlling interest in WROL-TV in Knoxville (now WATE-TV), but the two stations were not considered to be co-owned. Ever since its inception, WLAC-TV's analog signal was short-spaced to Memphis' WMC-TV, and Atlanta's WAGA-TV, also on VHF channel 5 (coincidentally, WMC-TV began on channel 4 and was immediately short-spaced to WSM-TV in Nashville, now WSMV). WLAC-TV was owned alongside WLAC radio (1510 AM) and later WLAC-FM (105.9 FM, now WNRQ). The call sign reflected the initials of the insurance company. It immediately took the CBS affiliation from WSIX-TV (channel 8, eventually WKRN-TV on channel 2) because WLAC (AM) had been Nashville's CBS Radio affiliate since 1928. With WLAC-TV, Nashville became one of the smallest cities in the United States to have three fully separate network-affiliated commercial television stations. American General Corporation, a Houston-based insurer, bought L&C and WLAC-AM-FM-TV in the 1960s.

In 1975, American General sold channel 5 to the Hobby family of Houston (owners of KPRC-AM-TV and the now-defunct Houston Post), who changed the station's call letters to the current WTVF on December 1. The call letter change was brought on due to an FCC rule in place at the time forbidding TV and radio stations in the same city from sharing the same base callsign if they had separate owners. American General/L&C eventually sold WLAC-AM-FM to other interests and the other stations have had several owners over the years. In 1983, the Hobbys reorganized their broadcast holdings as H&C Communications after the Post was sold. Landmark Communications, based in Norfolk, Virginia, bought WTVF from the Hobbys in 1994.

On January 30, 2008, Landmark announced its intention to sell WTVF, along with sister station KLAS-TV in Las Vegas and cable network The Weather Channel. This was followed on July 14, 2008, with an announcement that WTVF would be sold to Bonten Media Group, which at that time already owned 16 broadcast television stations in five states, including WCYB-TV in Bristol, Virginia. However, the deal was called off due to the 2008 financial crisis as Bonten informed Landmark that it could not close on the purchase after its key financial backer for that purchase, Lehman Brothers, filed for what remains the largest bankruptcy in American history. Although the sale of The Weather Channel and some other assets was eventually completed, Landmark (which changed its name from Landmark Communications to Landmark Media Enterprises in September 2008) took most of its other properties off the market in October 2008. As a result, WTVF and KLAS remained owned by Landmark. WTVF would have become the largest station owned by Bonten, as well as the first CBS affiliate in its portfolio.

On May 1 and 2, 2010, WTVF's newsroom was flooded with three feet (0.91 m) of water, and became non-operational for three months as it was being rebuilt. During the flooding, equipment was hastily moved to other locations around the building to prevent disruption of the station's news operation.

On September 4, 2012, Milwaukee-based Journal Communications announced that it would purchase WTVF from Landmark for $215 million. The FCC approved the sale on October 22, and it was consummated on December 6. With the transaction's completion, WTVF became the largest Journal-owned station by market size (displacing flagship WTMJ-TV, which became the second largest). It also made WTVF the sister station of KLAS-TV's rival, KTNV-TV.

On July 30, 2014, less than two years after Landmark sold the station to Journal, it was announced that Journal Communications would be bought out by the E. W. Scripps Company in an all-stock transaction. Scripps retained the companies' broadcast holdings, including WTVF, and spun off their print holdings into Journal Media Group. This marks the second time that Scripps has owned a Tennessee television station, as it was the founding owner of WMC-TV in Memphis from its 1948 sign-on until 1993. The FCC approved the deal on December 12, 2014. It was approved by the two companies' shareholders on March 11, 2015, and it closed on April 1.

On September 24, 2020, a consortium made up of Scripps and Berkshire Hathaway announced the proposed purchase of Ion Media. As there were no regulatory complications within the Nashville market, the deal made Ion station WNPX-TV (channel 28) a sister station to WTVF. The transaction was finalized and closed on January 7, 2021.

== Subchannel history ==
=== WTVF-DT2 ===
WTVF-DT2, branded as NewsChannel 5 Plus or NewsChannel 5+, is the second digital subchannel of WTVF, operating as an independent station. It broadcasts in standard definition on channel 5.2.

NewsChannel 5+ was introduced and launched in September 1996 as an all-news and information cable-only channel for the Nashville area. In addition to locally produced shows and newscast repeats, NewsChannel 5+ also carried programming from All News Channel until that service folded in September 2002. After that point, the channel's programming schedule relies mostly on original content.

NewsChannel 5+ was relaunched as an over-the-air digital sub-channel on June 21, 2009, nine days after the Digital TV transition of 2009, when WTVF began utilizing digital multi-casting on its digital signal. Since then, News Channel 5+ is being broadcast on digital channel 5.2. In mid-2014, WTVF-DT2's standard definition picture was upgraded to 16:9 SD widescreen to accommodate widescreen TVs.

On June 29, 2026, WTVF-DT2 replaced WNPX as Nashville's Ion Television O&O station; WTVF-DT2's original public affairs programming began airing on WNPX as part of its rebranding as an independent station.

=== WTVF-DT3 ===
WTVF-DT3, the third digital subchannel, which is also available on Comcast channel 249, was launched as an affiliate of This TV on the same day as the over-the-air relaunch of NewsChannel 5+ on WTVF-DT2. On September 24, 2015, it was replaced by Laff. On September 1, 2021, Bounce TV replaced Laff.

== Programming ==
From September 2017 to May 2019, WTVF produced the syndicated daily talk show Pickler & Ben, featuring country artist Kellie Pickler and comedian Ben Aaron. The program, which the station served as its flagship station, was recorded with a live audience at Skyway Studios, the former north Nashville studio facility of the Christian Broadcasting Network.

WTVF provides local coverage of New Year's Eve Live: Nashville's Big Bash on December 31 each year since 2021.

=== Sports programming ===
In 1998, WTVF became the primary home station for the Tennessee Titans, then still known as the Oilers starting with that season, when the rights to air road games of the National Football League's American Football Conference moved to CBS from NBC. In 2014, the first eight weeks of NFL Network's Thursday Night Football were added to WTVF's sports programming roster due to the new partnership between NFL Network and CBS to simulcast that program. WTVF began simulcasting any of the Tennessee Titans' TNF appearances in the late half of the season, beginning with the Titans–Jacksonville Jaguars game on November 19, 2015. In the 2013 and 2014 seasons, that duty was previously held by Fox affiliate WZTV; from 2018 to 2021, WZTV broadcast TNF games as part of Fox's rights to the package. In 2022, TNF broadcasts returned to WTVF; currently, any of the Titans' Thursday night appearances air on the station through a simulcast with Amazon Prime Video.

In the mid-1980s, WTVF shared with WZTV the local broadcast rights to Southeastern Conference basketball games produced by the Lorimar Sports Network until that syndication service dissolved after the 1985–86 season. Beginning January 1987, when Jefferson-Pilot Teleproductions began syndicating those games, WSMV began serving as the package's primary Nashville-area rights-holder until WUXP-TV won the local rights for the rest of that package's run.

WTVF aired any Vanderbilt Commodores football games selected for broadcast on the SEC on CBS from 1996 to 2023.

During the 2024–25 season, WTVF announced an agreement to simulcast three Nashville Predators games alongside FanDuel Sports Network South.

=== Past programming ===
Buck Owens and Roy Clark hosted the long-running country music variety show Hee Haw, which was taped at the WLAC-TV/WTVF studios.

The station's Studio A, which was built in 1967 near the Tennessee State Capitol building, was also the home of the hit show Hee Haw for most of its 1968 to 1993 run; its last few years were recorded at The Nashville Network's studios, adjacent to the now-defunct Opryland USA theme park. Additionally, the 1970s syndicated version of Candid Camera originated from the station's facilities for most of its run.

The station's relation to WLAC, which was known for many years for its nighttime soul music programming, led it to air a groundbreaking show on Friday and Saturday nights during the mid-and late-1960s called Night Train hosted by Noble Blackwell (a disc jockey on Nashville soul radio station WVOL (1470 AM)), which featured R&B performances and dancing similar to American Bandstand. Early in his career, Jimi Hendrix played guitar in a band that appeared on the show. From 1972 to 1975, Show Biz, Inc.'s The Bobby Goldsboro Show was recorded at the WLAC-TV/WTVF studios.

In March 1984, WTVF launched its locally produced magazine format program, Talk of the Town, hosted by Debbie Alan. Co-hosts Harry Chapman and Joe Case joined the show a few months later. Case also did weather for the show and for the morning and midday newscasts, while Chapman was the station's entertainment reporter.

WTVF aired the CBS Daytime lineup out of pattern in the late 1980s to early 1990s. WTVF aired The Bold and the Beautiful on a delay at 1:30 p.m. and As the World Turns at 3 p.m.; Talk of the Town occupied the 12:30 p.m. timeslot. Like many other CBS stations prior to the 1993 debut of Late Show with David Letterman, WLAC/WTVF also did not carry or delayed CBS' late night programming to air their own syndicated programs such as newsmagazines and sitcoms.

In the mid-2020s, the main channel began airing the second hour of CBS Saturday Morning at 9 a.m., with the first hour aired on WTVF-DT2. This shifted the CBS WKND educational block from 9–11 a.m. to 10 a.m.–noon on Saturdays.

=== WTVF-DT2/NewsChannel 5+ programming ===
WTVF-DT2 featured locally produced programming, repeats of local news from the main channel, and a few syndicated shows that may not fit on the program schedule of the main channel. The subchannel also aired live gavel-to-gavel coverage of high-profile criminal trials in the Nashville area including those of Paul Dennis Reid, Perry March, Mary Winkler, Lindsey Lowe, as well as the three suspects in the Holly Bobo case, the latter of which gained national attention in the 2010s. WTVF-DT2 went live during severe weather and had, on some occasions, aired local newscasts if CBS programming is preempted on the main channel, such as during the NCAA Division I men's basketball tournament, which has been a staple in CBS Sports programming since 1982.

For many years CBS Saturday Morning did not run on the main channel, it ran instead on WTVF-DT2 on a one-hour delay, from 8 to 10 a.m. CT. CBS Overnight News was also run almost in its entirety during each weekday morning, usually from 1:35 to 3:30 a.m., since the main channel aired certain syndicated programming and did not join the overnight news program until 2:37 a.m. It also carried the full hour of CBS's Face the Nation, since WTVF previously aired the first half-hour of the program only; the main channel airs religious programming from 10 to 11 a.m. Children's educational programming on WTVF-DT2 was a replay of the This TV children's programming block that was run on WTVF-DT3 on Sunday mornings; WTVF-DT2 rebroadcast that programming on Sunday afternoons. In the mid-2020s, the main channel began airing the second hour of CBS Saturday Morning at 9 a.m., with the first hour aired on WTVF-DT2. This continued following the transition of NewsChannel 5+ from WTVF-DT2 to WNPX as "The Spot - Nashville 28" in June 2026.

WTVF-DT2 also replayed most, if not all, newscasts and editions of their locally produced show, Talk of the Town. In addition, WTVF-DT2's parent station also produced five hours of newscasts each week for NewsChannel 5+ in the form of an hour-long extension of WTVF's weekday morning newscast airing from 7 to 8 a.m. before this newscast was phased out in favor of a weekday 9 a.m. newscast on the main channel.

NewsChannel 5+ programming aired on WTVF-DT2 included OpenLine, MorningLine, Retirement Report, Southern Woods and Waters, Inside Politics, Issues of Faith, and Urban Outlook. Following the transition to "The Spot - Nashville 28", OpenLine went on an indefinite hiatus, while the other programs continued airing alongside syndicated content and WNPX's rights to air Nashville Predators regular season games beginning in October 2026.

=== News operation ===
WTVF broadcasts 46 1/2 hours of locally produced newscasts each week (with 7 1/2 hours each on Mondays through Fridays, five hours on Saturday, and four hours on Sundays); the weekend evening news is occasionally delayed or preempted by CBS Sports broadcasts. In addition, the station produces the half-hour news/interview program Talk of the Town on weekdays at 11 a.m. and a weekly sports wrap-up program, Sunday Sports Central, on Sundays from 10:22 p.m. to 10:50 p.m. as part of the 10 p.m. newscast. Weekday morning newscasts last from 4 to 7 a.m., and the 6 p.m. newscasts last for a full hour. Since February 22, 2014, WTVF's weekend morning newscast has started at 5 a.m. (formerly 6 a.m.), lasting until 9 a.m. on Saturdays and 8 a.m. on Sundays. The station formerly produced five hours of newscasts each week for NewsChannel 5+ in the form of an hour-long extension of WTVF's weekday morning newscast at 7 a.m. This was phased out by the early 2020s in favor of a 9 a.m. talk show-style newscast that debuted on September 6, 2022. The broadcast, originally 30 minutes, was expanded to a full hour on September 5, 2023. On September 8, 2026, WTVF debuted an hour-long afternoon newscast, NewsChannel 5 at 3, which featured a hybrid newscast/talk show-style format, featuring expanded Talk of the Town content in addition to news and weather.

Talk of the Town, the station's primary mid-day show, premiered on WTVF on March 19, 1984. The show features information about upcoming events around middle Tennessee, interviews with local personalities (some national), as well as some recipes are featured on the show. In April 2014, the station celebrated the show's 30th anniversary by airing pieces of old episodes within the past 30 years of the show's run for a few weeks. With the show still on the air, Talk of The Town was declared the longest locally produced television show in the Nashville television market, and the whole nation. It currently airs every weekday at 11 a.m. on the main channel, with replays in the afternoon on The Spot - Nashville 28/NewsChannel 5+.

==== History of the news department ====
Chris Clark was the longtime anchorman of WLAC-TV/WTVF in Nashville; he is seen here in a 1974 ad for its newscasts.

A full broadcast of the August 8, 1974, 6 p.m. newscast exists in the Vanderbilt Television News Archive in Nashville, the result of the Archive's staff inadvertently leaving recording equipment on after taping CBS News' coverage of the events leading to the resignation of President Richard Nixon at 5:30 p.m., in the wake of the Watergate scandal. The broadcast featured interviews with Nashville-area and Tennessee politicians about that day's events in Washington and was anchored by Harry Chapman, with Ron Kaiser doing the weather and Hope Hines the sports. Main anchor Chris Clark filed a telephone report from Washington concerning reaction from the senators and representatives in Tennessee's Congressional delegation. Since it was not the policy of the Archive to record local newscasts alongside network ones and this occurrence was quite accidental, this may well be the only preserved, full-length Nashville television news broadcast prior to the late 1970s (when videocassette recorders became widely marketed to the public), other than local cut-ins to network election coverage and two 1973 special broadcasts of Today (on WSM-TV). It is available for public viewing at the Archive, but because of the equipment at the time, the broadcast was recorded in black and white, although all live television by then was broadcast in color. Before the advent of satellite technology in the 1980s, the Archive taped all CBS News broadcasts from the airwaves of WLAC-TV/WTVF.

During the 1970s and 1980s, the station used the Eyewitness News moniker for its newscasts. The current NewsChannel 5 branding and logo have been in use since August 1989. In 1974, WLAC became the first network affiliate in the country to use Electronic News Gathering (ENG) to bring live field reports to its viewers. On February 2, 2007, WTVF unveiled a new on-air look complete with a new state-of-the-art news set, weather center, and graphics in tandem its official upgrade to high definition newscasts (becoming the 25th television station in the United States to broadcast its local news programming in high definition and one of only four at the time with an HD weather center and system). The new set was built in a separate studio from its existing news set minimizing disruptions of news operations. The old, existing news set is now currently used for some original programs aired on NewsChannel 5+, which was broadcast over WTVF-DT2 until June 2026 when NewsChannel 5+ moved to sister station WNPX, becoming The Spot - Nashville 28.

WTVF produced daily 90-second news updates for UniMás affiliate WLLC-LP (channel 42), anchored by Eva Melo. It was the only Spanish-language newscast in Nashville, a market consisting of about 4% Spanish-speaking viewers, a fast-growing audience in the Middle Tennessee area. As of 2011, WTVF no longer produced news updates for WLLC-LP, as they were canceled.

WTVF started using Scripps' standardized graphics in May 2016.

==== Weather coverage ====
The station's weather coverage utilized its first live doppler radar in 1958.

On April 16, 1998, WTVF was knocked off the air due to an F3 tornado striking downtown Nashville. This occurred while meteorologists Ron Howes and Joe Case were broadcasting live, showing the actual tornado from the station's SkyCam as it entered downtown Nashville. Before the interruption of the signal, which was caused by winds in excess of 100 miles per hour (161 km/h), the station's weather camera on top of the AT&T Building (then BellSouth Building) captured the tornado as it moved into downtown Nashville during the station's broadcast of wall-to-wall tornado warning coverage that afternoon. The station returned to the air shortly after that, with Chris Clark and Ron Howes broadcasting weather information from the station's transmitter, with the help of a legal notepad, a two-way radio and a television camera connected directly to the transmitter for the remainder of the afternoon.

Currently, the station's weather department utilizes data from five National Weather Service NEXRAD doppler radars (Nashville, Huntsville, Memphis, Paducah, and Louisville). The station also has a policy of broadcasting uninterrupted, wall-to-wall severe weather coverage when a tornado warning is issued for any part of the station's primary coverage area.

==== Past on-air staff; awards ====
As WLAC-TV, the station helped launch the career of a young African-American reporter and local Nashvillian named Oprah Winfrey by making her a regular news anchor in the early 1970s. Behind Winfrey, the station's most notable anchor is Greek-American Chris Clark (real name Christopher Botsaris), who served as the station's main anchor for 41 years from 1966 to 2007, longer than anyone in Nashville television history. In June 2006, Clark reduced his daily anchoring schedule to only the weeknight 6 p.m. newscast and announced his retirement at the end of his contract in 2007. Clark's final broadcast aired on May 23, 2007. The station ran a number of on-air tributes in the days leading up to Clark's departure. He signed off with a tribute to his co-workers and friends and gave his closing line a final time: "I'll see you then...", which was the closing line he used at the end of each teaser. Rhori Johnston, the co-anchor on the weeknight 5 and 10 p.m. broadcasts, succeeded Clark at 6 p.m. Before arriving at WLAC/WTVF, Clark, a graduate of the University of Georgia, worked for stations in his native Georgia in Atlanta and Albany. While at Albany's WALB-TV, Clark interviewed civil rights movement leader Martin Luther King Jr.

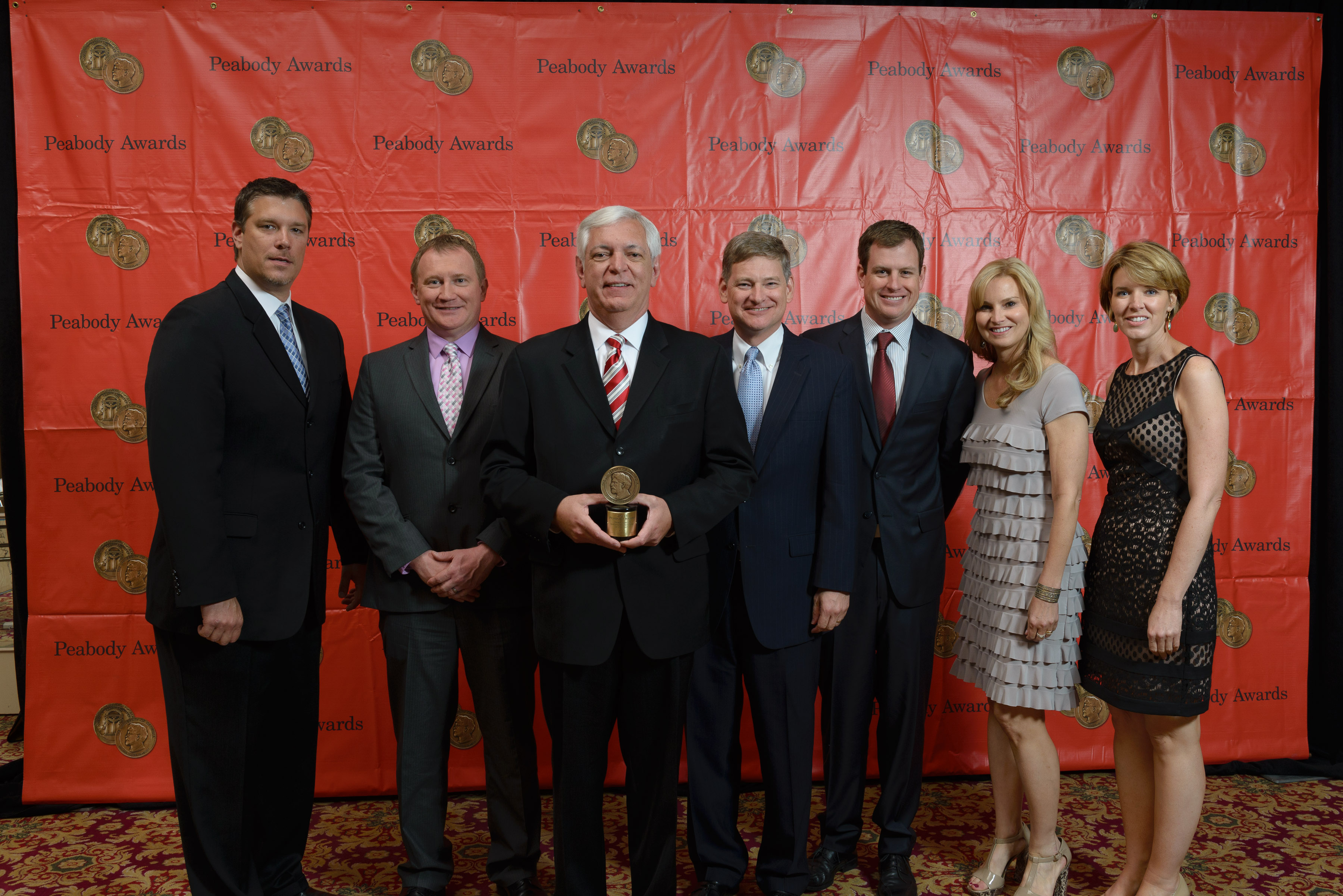
Bryan Staples, Kevin Wisniewski, Phil Williams, Ben Hall, Iain Montgomery, Sandy Boonstra and Michelle Bonnett of News Channel 5 at the 73rd Annual Peabody Awards for "Questions of Influence."

In 1998, WTVF-TV hired investigative reporter Phil Williams, who had previously been a finalist for the Pulitzer Prize while working at The Tennessean and a recipient of the George Foster Peabody Award while working for WKRN-TV. As a result, WTVF created one of the country's most highly acclaimed investigative units, which it branded as its NewsChannel 5 Investigates team. As the team expanded, Williams assumed the title of chief investigative reporter. in 2001, Williams and photojournalist Bryan Staples received the prestigious IRE Medal for an investigation of police corruption that resulted in threats against Williams and his family. Williams and the NewsChannel 5 Investigates team also exposed questionable contracting by the administration of then-Gov. Don Sundquist, receiving a Peabody Award, a duPont-Columbia University Award and a George Polk Award.

The team won its second duPont Award in 2010 for an investigation of corruption inside the Davidson County General Sessions Court system and a third duPont in 2012 for its "Policing for Profit" investigation of civil forfeiture abuses. In addition, the team (including Williams and investigative reporter Ben Hall) received a 2013 Peabody Award for its "Questions of Influence" investigation of shady deals by Gov. Bill Haslam's administration. The continuing "Policing for Profit" investigation later received the 2015 Hillman Prize for Broadcast Journalism.

===== Notable former on-air staff =====
- Brenda Blackmon – news anchor/reporter
- Chris Clark – news anchor/reporter
- Bud Hedinger – anchor
- Hope Hines – sports director
- Charles Kennedy – anchor
- Neil O'Donnell – sports analyst
- Oprah Winfrey – news anchor/reporter

== Technical information ==
=== Subchannels ===
The station's signal is multiplexed:

Subchannels of WTVF
Subchannel	Res.	Short name	Programming
5.1	1080i	WTVF-HD	CBS
5.2	720p	ION	Ion
5.3	480i	Bounce	Bounce TV
5.4	480i	IONPlus	Ion Plus
58.1	480i	ROAR	Roar (WNAB)
58.2	480i	Nest	The Nest (WNAB)
58.3	480i	Charge!	Charge! (WNAB)

Broadcast on behalf of another station

=== Analog-to-digital conversion ===
WTVF signed on its digital signal on November 15, 2001. The station shut down its analog signal, over VHF channel 5, on June 12, 2009, the official date on which full-power television stations in the United States transitioned from analog to digital broadcasts under federal mandate. The station's digital signal relocated from its pre-transition UHF channel 56, which was among the high band UHF channels (52–69) that were removed from broadcasting use as a result of the transition, to its analog-era VHF channel 5.

After the transition occurred, some viewers in the immediate Nashville area were having reception problems of the VHF digital channel. On July 6, 2009, the station filed an application to operate a low-powered digital translator on UHF channel 50, broadcasting at 100 kW, to serve viewers that could not receive the VHF signal. The original application to operate this translator has yet to be granted but STAs have been approved. On July 31, 2009, WTVF began simulcasting on its digital subchannels the over-the-air relaunch of "NewsChannel 5+" (originally a cable-only channel) on 5.2 and the addition of classic movie network, This TV on 5.3.

On September 7, 2012, WTVF relocated its main digital signal to UHF channel 25 and shut down its UHF fill-in translator on channel 50. The VHF channel 5 was converted to a fill-in translator to serve the far fringes of the station's viewing area.

=== Spectrum incentive auction results ===
Due to the station's participation in the FCC's 2016–17 spectrum incentive auction, WTVF filed for a construction permit to relocate its digital allocation to UHF channel 36. As a result, on October 18, 2019, WTVF moved to its new frequency due to spectrum repacking. Ion Television O&O station WNPX-TV, which previously broadcast its digital signal on UHF channel 36, moved its digital signal to UHF channel 32 on the same day.

=== Translator ===
- WTVF (DRT) 5 Nashville

== Out-of-market coverage ==
Viewers residing in several areas outside of the Nashville media market can view WTVF, depending on the cable provider and location. Carriage of the station's signal on cable systems outside the Nashville market is subject to Syndication exclusivity, or SyndEx, where the local CBS affiliate's feed substitutes that of WTVF when network and/or syndicated programming is shown on both stations at the same time.

=== Southern Kentucky ===
WTVF is a significantly viewed station in the Bowling Green, Kentucky, television market, owing to its transmitter being located on the north side of Nashville. As a result, its signal was strong enough to be received in most of that area. For its first 52 years on the air, WTVF had a decades-long monopoly in providing CBS programming to several counties in south-central Kentucky as that area was originally part of the Nashville market until Arbitron collapsed Bowling Green into its own market area in 1977 as a result of the growth and success by that city's ABC affiliate WBKO. Even after Nielsen also assigned Bowling Green into its own market area in 1985, CBS was still not available from a local outlet in that area. This changed on February 1, 2007, when NBC affiliate WNKY launched a new second digital subchannel to serve as that area's own CBS affiliate. In spite of the existence of WNKY-DT2, WTVF remains available on several cable systems in the Bowling Green market. Mediacom cable systems currently carry the station's main channel in the Morgantown (Butler County) and Brownsville (Edmonson County) areas. WTVF also remains available on Charter Spectrum in Bowling Green, along with the on-campus cable system WesternCable at Western Kentucky University, as well as the Glasgow-based cable system of the South Central Rural Telephone Cooperative, which services much of the eastern half of the Bowling Green market. The SCRTC in Glasgow also has been piping in Louisville CBS affiliate WLKY as a secondary option since 1990, along with that city's previous CBS affiliate WHAS-TV, which served as such for its first 40 years on the air. Many areas of the Bowling Green market can still pick up WTVF via an outdoor antenna; some users of indoor antennas in southern Kentucky, and the far reaches of the station's coverage area can also pick up the signal thanks to the station's 2013 digital signal upgrade.

The Glasgow Electric Plant Board also carried WTVF and WSMV as distant CBS and NBC affiliates, respectively. That provider dropped WTVF, WSMV and their associated subchannels from their lineup in late 2017 as WNKY and WNKY-DT2 claimed market exclusivity in terms of NBC and CBS affiliates on that system.

In 1968, the station, as WLAC-TV, once applied to set up a low-power translator station on the campus of Western Kentucky University for improved reception within Bowling Green city limits; this plan may have never come to fruition.

=== Western Kentucky ===
Mediacom carries the station's main channel on their systems in Caldwell and Crittenden counties, including the communities of Princeton and Marion, both of which are in the Paducah, Kentucky–Cape Girardeau, Missouri–Harrisburg, Illinois media market. The station is also carried on Murray Electric System cable in the Murray area of Calloway County, which is also in the Paducah market. Cornerstone Connectivity (formerly WK&T Telecom) also makes WTVF available to its Calloway County customers. WTVF is also carried on cable systems in Muhlenberg and Hopkins counties, which are in the Evansville, Indiana, market.

=== Other areas of Tennessee ===
WTVF is carried on several cable systems in other areas outside of the Nashville market and within the state of Tennessee. In Jackson, Tennessee, WTVF is currently the only Nashville-based station that is carried on Jackson Energy Authority's E-Plus Broadband cable service. Other systems in the Jackson market carry the station, including Cornerstone Connectivity's customers in the Trenton area of Gibson County, as well as two of the three northwest Tennessee counties within the Paducah market, Weakley and Obion, including the Martin–Dresden and Union City–South Fulton areas, respectively.

The station is also available on cable in the Fayetteville area of Lincoln County, the only Middle Tennessee county that is assigned to the Huntsville, Alabama, media market. WTVF's main channel is also carried on cable systems in Fentress County (Jamestown), as well as on Spirit Broadband Cable channel 5 for that provider's customers in Cumberland County, Tennessee (including Crossville and Fairfield Glade), both areas of which are in the two Central Time Zone counties of the Knoxville media market.

=== Northern Alabama ===
From 1957 until the 1980s, WTVF, along with WSMV, WKRN, and later WZTV, were all carried on cable systems in northern Alabama, including the Huntsville, Florence and Decatur areas. As new national cable channels launched they were gradually dropped from those systems throughout the 1980s.
