= Charles A. Berry =

American aerospace physician (1923–2020)

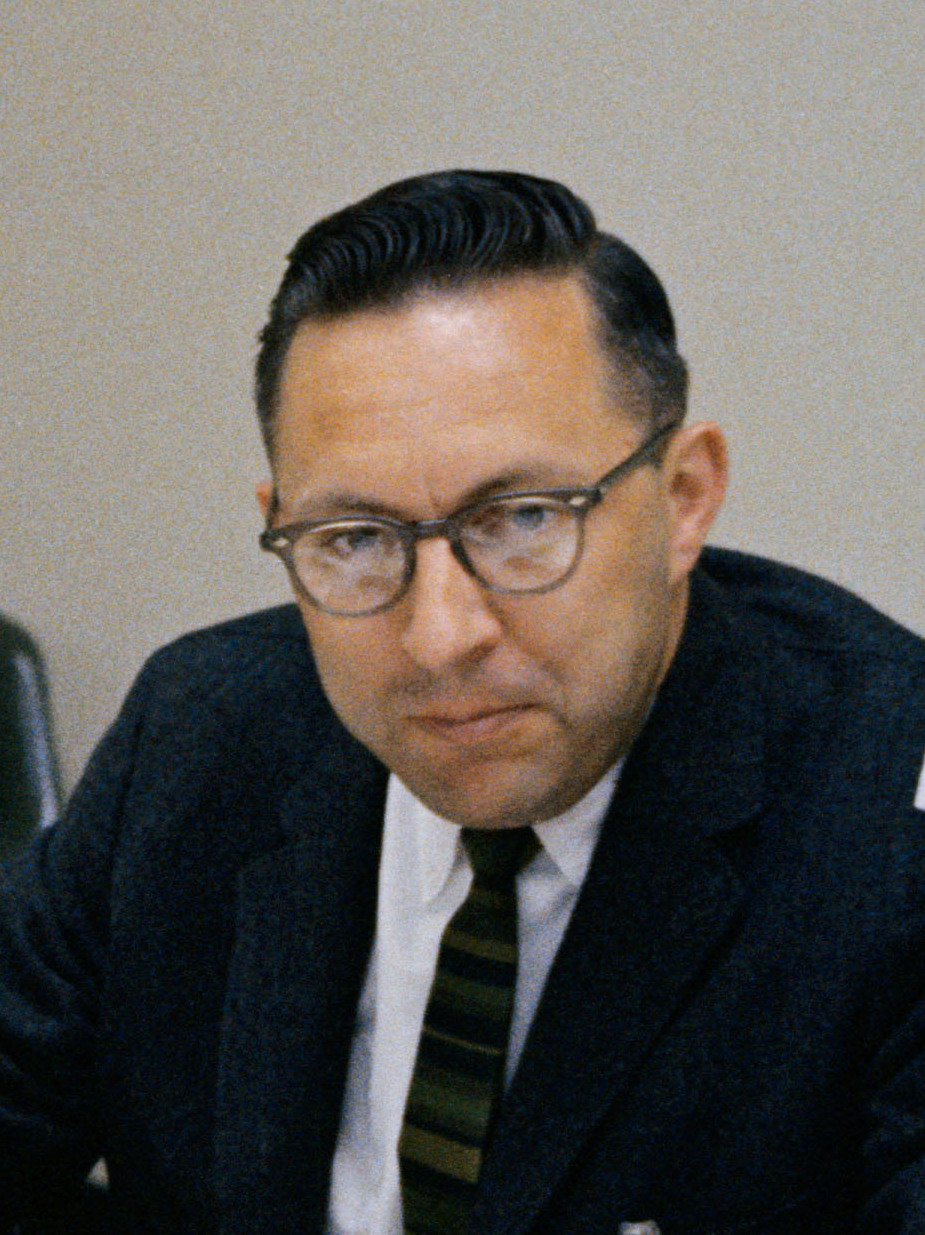
- Berry in 1965
- Born: September 17, 1923
- Died: March 1, 2020 (age 96)
- Education: University of California, Berkeley (BA, MD); Harvard University (MPH)
- Scientific career
- Fields: Aerospace Medicine
- Workplaces: National Aeronautics and Space Administration

Charles A. Berry (September 17, 1923 – March 1, 2020) was the Director of Life Sciences at the National Aeronautics and Space Administration and was known as the "astronauts' doctor". Working in the field of aerospace medicine, he participated in medical support of the Apollo space program.

Berry received his M.D. degree from the University of California, Berkeley in 1947 and served as a Flight Surgeon in the U.S. Air Force from 1951 through 1963. He then served as a member of the Mercury Astronaut Selection Committee in 1959 and then provided medical expertise to NASA. He served as Chief Physician at the Johnson Space Center from 1962 until 1971, and as Director of Life Sciences at NASA Headquarters between 1971 and 1974. In 1973, He was awarded NASA Distinguished Service Medal by NASA. After leaving NASA, he served as president of the University of Texas Health Science Center at Houston from 1974 to 1977. In 1977, Berry joined KPRC-TV, the NBC affiliate in Houston, as the House Physician.
