= Chris Clark (reporter) =

American journalist

- Born: Chris Botsaris; December 9, 1938 (age 87); Atlanta, Georgia, United States
- Occupation: News presenter

Chris Clark (real name Chris Botsaris; born December 9, 1938) is the former lead news anchor at WTVF in Nashville, Tennessee. Clark's tenure at WTVF began in 1966 (then known as WLAC-TV), and lasted until his retirement on May 23, 2007. His 41 years at WTVF makes him one of the longest-tenured anchors in American television history. Clark also served as the station's News Director during the earlier years of his career.

== Biography ==
Clark was born as Chris Botsaris on December 9, 1938, in Atlanta, Georgia. The grandson of Greek immigrants (his parents were both American-born Greeks), he graduated from North Fulton High School in 1957. As a teenager he worked bussing tables at his father's Eagle Café, across the street from the offices of The Atlanta Journal-Constitution. Chris heard colorful stories from the reporters that frequented the restaurant, and decided to become a reporter himself, graduating from the University of Georgia's School of Journalism in 1962. He was a member of Alpha Tau Omega. He was asked to change his last name from Botsaris to Clark before joining WALB in Albany, Georgia in 1961, and would go on to anchor and report the news at WAII-TV in Atlanta (now WXIA-TV) from 1964 to 1966, until an executive from WTVF (then called WLAC-TV) invited him to Nashville to interview for lead news anchor. He would serve as lead news anchor from 1966 until his retirement on May 23, 2007.

Among the countries documented in his reporting: Somalia, Great Britain, the Soviet Union, Israel, Puerto Rico, and the Dominican Republic.

He also was involved in a crisis situation when Tennessee Governor Buford Ellington called him in to mediate the release of hostages held by an inmate at the state penitentiary.

During his time as news director at WTVF, he was a part of the station's conversion from film to electronic news coverage. Shortly before his retirement the station became the first in the Nashville market to broadcast in High Definition.

As chair of the Society of Professional Journalists Freedom of Information Committee, Chris played a role in convincing the Tennessee Supreme Court to allow an experiment with cameras in the court. That experiment persuaded the justices to allow cameras in state courts.

He is currently a teacher at Middle Tennessee State University in the Media and Mass Communication Colleges.

== Awards ==
Clark won the 1993 Emmy from the Middle Tennessee chapter of NATAS for a lifetime achievement in broadcast journalism and also the Associated Press "Broadcaster of the Year" award.

== Rotary Club ==
Clark was a longtime member of the Downtown Rotary Club. His fellow members honored him in 1994-95 by electing him president of the club. Since his retirement, he has moved his Rotary membership to the Brentwood area chapter.

He has worked for decades on behalf of the Holy Trinity Greek Orthodox Church. Clark spent 8 years as president of the Parish Council.

During his tenure as president, Holy Trinity constructed its church and fellowship hall on Franklin Road. It is the only example of Byzantine architecture in Middle Tennessee.
