= Linda Lorelle =

American journalist

- Lorelle in 2024
- Education: Stanford University (BA); University of Missouri-Columbia (MA)
- Occupation: Journalist

Linda Lorelle is a journalist who anchored the evening news for nearly 17 years at Houston's NBC affiliate, KPRC-TV. She is CEO and executive producer of Linda Lorelle Media, a communications consulting and video production firm based in Houston. She is a co-founder of the democracy initiative, Civil Dialogues, along with Jean Becker, former Chief of Staff to President George H. W. Bush during his post presidency.

Lorelle created and hosts the Our Voices Matter podcast. She won an Emmy for Beyond Brown vs. Board: The Journey Continues, a documentary on how Houston desegregated its schools, and an Emmy for her first-person account of another local news anchor's cancer. She garnered two national Gracie Awards, given by the American Women in Radio and Television.

== Early life, education, and early career ==
Linda Lorelle attained a B.A. in developmental psychology and a B.A. in Italian language from Stanford University, before starting a career as a professional dancer and actress. A career-ending injury was the catalyst to move her toward a new career in journalism in 1987.

Lorelle then attained an M.A. in broadcast journalism from the University of Missouri-Columbia. While in graduate school, she became weekend anchor at KOMU-TV, the NBC affiliate in Columbia, Missouri.

== Journalism and broadcasting ==
After graduating, Lorelle went on to reporting at KMOV-TV, the CBS affiliate in St. Louis, Missouri.

In 1989, she signed on with KPRC-TV in Houston as a weekend anchor, and was soon promoted to anchoring the weekday 6 and 10 pm newscasts, a position she held for 14 years. In the last two and a half years of her employment at KPRC, Linda moved to anchoring the 5 and 6 pm newscasts, as well as the mid-day and 4 pm shows. Throughout her years at KPRC, she anchored Dateline Houston, led the station's documentary projects, and hosted several special programs, including the Muscular Dystrophy Labor Day Telethon and the College Fund (UNCF) Telethon. While at KPRC, she won two Emmys for "Beyond Brown vs. Board: The Journey Continues", a documentary on how Houston desegregated its schools, and "Sydney's Story", her first person account of another local news anchor's (Sydney Seaward of KNWS-TV battle with cancer.

Lorelle has reported on a variety of stories and events through the years as a reporter and anchor, including Hurricanes Katrina and Rita; President Bill Clinton's first inauguration; President George W. Bush's first inauguration; the shuttle flight of Dr. Mae Jemison, the first woman of color in space and her Stanford roommate; John Glenn's return to space; the shuttle Columbia tragedy; Super Bowl XXXVIII; numerous NBA and WNBA Finals; the World Series; the Houston Rockets in China, and President George H.W. Bush's 80th birthday, complete with a first person account of what it's like to sky dive with the Golden Knights of the U.S. Army.

Her Gracie Award-winning documentary on the former President George H.W. Bush now has two permanent homes: at the Bush Presidential Library in College Station and in the Peabody Collection of the Museum of Broadcast Communications in Chicago, Illinois. The Brown vs. Board documentary also rests in the Museum.

Lorelle left KPRC-TV in 2006. In 2009, she founded Linda Lorelle Media, a multimedia production and communications consulting firm. She works across all industries, C-suites and issues as a documentary filmmaker, expert media trainer and executive coach, producer and community convener. In 2018, she launched a podcast, Our Voices Matter, sharing intimate conversations that remind us of our common humanity.

== Recognition and awards ==
In addition to her two Emmys, Lorelle is also a two-time recipient of the national Gracie Award from the American Women in Radio and Television, as well as numerous honors on the local, regional and national level:

- 2023 Two Bronze Telly Awards for Lorelle Media documentary “Memorial Park Conservancy Land Bridge & Prairie” in categories Non-Broadcast Sustainability and Branded Content Not for Profit
- 2022 Silver Signal Award' for Our Voices Matter Podcast, LGBTQ+ category: “It’s Not a Choice”, featuring Liam Paschall
- 2022 Bronze Signal Award for Our Voices Matter Podcast, Best Gateway category: “The Power & Cost of Owning Your Story”, featuring Amr Awadallah & Sara Selber
- 2021 Silver Telly Award and Bronze Quill Award, Video for Baker Hughes, “Energy Transition”
- 2021 Silver Telly Award and Bronze Quill Award, Video for Memorial Park Conservancy, “Eastern Glades
- 2021 Silver Telly Award, Our Voices Matter Podcast; Social Impact Category
- 2021 Bronze Quill Award, Best of Division and Best of Show, Video for Memorial Park Conservancy, “Eastern Glades”
- 2019 Bronze Quill Award, Best of Division and Award of Excellence, mini documentary, “Now That We Know, We Can Never Forget” about discovery of slave cemeteries on Shell property in Louisiana
- 2019 Top 20 Impact Maker Award
- 2018 Shell Social Performance Award for mini documentary, “Now That We Know, We Can Never Forget” about discovery of slave cemeteries on Shell property in Louisiana
- 2017 Telly Award for the documentary, “Harmony Public Schools: Charting A Course Toward the Future”
- 2016 Silver and Bronze Quill Awards, IABC Houston, for the documentary “After the Storm: Deepwater’s Journey,” commissioned by Shell Oil Company to commemorate the 10th anniversary of Hurricane Katrina
- 2016 Named one of Houston’s 50 Most Influential Women
- 2015 Team Spirit Award, Chuck Norris & Kickstart Kids
- 2010 Woman of Distinction
- 2009 Inducted into the Greater Houston Women’s Hall of Fame - Induction video by President George H. W. Bush
- 2007 Houston Treasure Award, for her tireless commitment and contributions to the Houston community
- Loving Hearts Caring Hands Award from M.D. Anderson Cancer Center, for her commitment and contributions to M.D. Anderson
- 2006 Honoree at the Rose Gala, benefiting the Women's Home, for being an outstanding community leader
- 2005 AWRT Gracie Award, for 41@80: An Incredible Journey, a portrait of former President George H.W. Bush on his 80th birthday
- 2005 Houston Press Club Award, 1st Place, for “Houston’s Chinese Connection”, a documentary on Yao Ming and the Houston Rockets in China
- 2005 Houston Press Club Award, 2nd Place, 41@80: An Incredible Journey
- 2004 Emmy Award, for “Beyond Brown vs. Board: The Journey Continues”
- 2004 AWRT Gracie Award, Individual Achievement – Best Reporter/Correspondent for a 3-part series, “Goodbye Felicia Moon”
- 2004 AWRT Star Award, Best Houston Television Personality
- 2004 Whitney M. Young Humanitarian Award, Houston Area Urban League
- 2003 Macy’s Heart and Soul Award, honoring excellence in the fight against breast cancer
- 2002 Chron’s & Colitis Gold Key Award, recognizing Linda as an Exceptional Woman in the Houston community
- 2000 Anson Jones, M.D. Award for "Sydney's Story", a first person account of Lorelle's experience covering the breast cancer battle of Houston anchor Sydney Seaward. The article appeared in Health and Fitness Magazine
- 2000 Texas Associated Press Award for “She Got Game”, a one-on-one interview with WNBA star Cynthia Cooper about the Houston Comets’ 3rd championship and the death of teammate Kim Perrot
- 1997 Houston Press Club Award, 1st Place News Series, for “Sydney’s Story”
- Several awards for “Buddy Check 2: Beating the Breast Cancer Odds” series on breast cancer, including the 1995 Commendation Award from the American Women in Radio and Television, the Cancer League's Media Community Service Award and the Cancer Counseling Media Award of Excellence
- 1994 Makeda Award from the National Coalition of 100 Black Women, for outstanding contributions to the community
- 1993 Matrix Award from Women in Communications, for the series Mae's Dream, documenting the shuttle launch of the first black woman astronaut
- 1992 Sampson Award from Houston Tennis Association for outstanding contributions to youth
- 1992 Media Award from the Texas Association for Year-Round Education in recognition of positive reports on “The New System”, aired during the 1991-92 school year
- 1991 and 1990 School Bell Award from the Texas State Teachers Association, for outstanding news or feature series “They Should Know That” and “They Should Know That, Too”

== Linda Lorelle Scholarship Fund ==
Linda's interest in education and children led her to found the Linda Lorelle Scholarship Fund, a non-profit 501(c)(3) charity that provides major college scholarships and support to Houston area students. The LLSF targets students with average grades from challenging backgrounds. In September 2023, Linda and her husband, Lou Gregory, turned over the LLSF to 5 former scholars and their daughter, Lindsey. The next generation is now paying it forward and running LLSF 2.0.

== Community involvement ==
Lorelle's community activities include current and past, board and advisory board memberships in: the Linda Lorelle Scholarship Fund; Convergence Center for Policy Resolution; the Texas Woman’s University Institute of Health Sciences-Houston Center, the Houston Police Foundation; San Jacinto Girl Scouts; the Women's Resource; Society of Professional Journalists; Sisters Network; the Houston Zoo; the Junior League; the Children's Assessment Center Foundation and Casa de Esperanza and I Have A Dream. Lorelle also served as the Selection Committee Chair for the 2002 Leon Jaworski Award.
