= Bill Enis =

American sportscaster (1934–1973)

Cleon William Enis (January 24, 1934 – December 14, 1973) was an American sportscaster. He was born in Tarrant County, Texas, the son of William Cleon Enis and Judith Elizabeth (née Taylor) Enis. The family lived at 2414 Ben Avenue in Ft. Worth at the time of his birth.

A graduate of Louisiana State University, Enis was the sports director of KPRC-TV in Houston, Texas, for whom he called occasional Houston Oilers and Houston Astros games. From 1968 until his death, he also called play-by-play of regional NFL and MLB games for NBC, and he worked the sidelines for the network's telecasts of Super Bowl V and Super Bowl VII.

Enis died from a heart attack at his home in Houston on December 14, 1973, aged 39. He was married and had four children with his wife, Iris. His son Bart also became a sportscaster in Houston, working in radio and, from 2002 to 2018, on television for AT&T SportsNet Southwest.
