= The Eyes of Texas (TV series) =

American television series

- Presented by: Ray Miller (1969–1979); Ron Stone (1979–1999)
- Country of origin: United States

Production
- Running time: 30 minutes
- Production companies: KPRC-TV; Stonefilms

Original release
- Network: Syndication
- Release: June 22, 1969 – 1999

The Eyes of Texas is a long-running regional television series which aired original episodes from June 22, 1969, to 1999. The program focused on unique people, events, and places throughout the state of Texas. It was produced and syndicated by KPRC-TV and Stonefilms, both in Houston. The series won a number of awards and produced a number of travel guides covering the state, intertwining notable locations featured in the program with the usual tourist attractions.

== Hosts ==
The first host, KPRC news director Ray Miller (1919–2008), created the show and nurtured it through the early years. The Eyes of Texas evolved into a weekly celebration of Texas culture, history, and people. After Miller retired in 1979, KPRC anchor Ron Stone, whose production company syndicates the series, took over as host.

Beginning in 2007, KPRC presented several "Best of" programs featuring memorable stories aired during the course of the original run, interspersed with recent pieces on various events and places in the style of the original series. These episodes were aired periodically and were hosted at the time by co-anchors Bill Balleza and Dominique Sachse.

In October 2018, The Eyes of Texas was rebooted as a podcast hosted by KPRC reporter Brandon Walker.

== Travel guides ==
These travel guides, all containing text by Miller and photographs by Gary James (and others), were published in Houston by Cordovan Corporation:

- Miller, Ray (1977). The Eyes of Texas Travel Guide: Gulf Coast Edition. Cordovan Corporation. ISBN 0-89123-061-0. LCCN 77015808.
- Miller, Ray (1978). The Eyes of Texas Travel Guide: Dallas/East Texas Edition. Cordovan Corporation. ISBN 0-89123-056-4. LCCN 78067186.
- Miller, Ray (1979). The Eyes of Texas Travel Guide: San Antonio/Border Edition. Cordovan Corporation. ISBN 0-89123-068-8. LCCN 79090085.
- Miller, Ray (1980). The Eyes of Texas Travel Guide: Hill Country/Permian Basin Edition. Cordovan Corporation. ISBN 0-89123-070-X. LCCN 80068868.
- Miller, Ray (1981). The Eyes of Texas Travel Guide: Ft. Worth/Brazos Valley Edition. Cordovan Corporation. ISBN 0-89123-098-X. LCCN 81068873.
- Miller, Ray (1982). The Eyes of Texas Travel Guide: Panhandle/Plains Edition. Cordovan Corporation. ISBN 0-89123-024-6. LCCN 82070231.

Second editions of the guides were published in the late 1980s by Lone Star Press.
