= KBAR-FM =

- Victoria, Texas; United States
- Frequency: 100.9 MHz
- Branding: 100.9 K-Bar

Programming
- Format: Classic country

Ownership
- Owner: Victoria Radioworks, Ltd.
- Sister stations: KITE, KVIC, KNAL, KVNN

History
- First air date: July 20, 1989
- Former call signs: KEPG (1986–2007)
- Call sign meaning: "Bar"

Technical information
- Licensing authority: FCC
- Facility ID: 74362
- Class: C3
- ERP: 15,000 watts
- HAAT: 130.0 meters (426.5 ft)
- Transmitter coordinates: 28°46′55″N 96°56′29″W

Links
- Public license information: Public file; LMS

KBAR-FM (100.9 FM) is a commercial radio station broadcasting a classic country format. Licensed to Victoria, Texas, United States, the station is currently owned by Victoria Radioworks, Ltd.

== History ==
KBAR-FM was initially proposed by Yolanda G. Dorsett as a 2.5 kilowatt Class A facility, from an elevation of 100 meters. The original proposed transmission site was near West River Street and North Bluff Street, west of U.S. Highway 87 in Victoria. The application was granted on June 24, 1986, with the construction permit being assigned the call set KEPG on July 8, 1986. A minor modification to the permit, increasing ERP to 2.9 kilowatts, decreasing elevation to 93 meters height above average terrain, and moving KEPG's transmission site to Farm to Market Road 236 near Pozzi Road, southwest of Victoria. KEPG received its initial License to Cover on July 20, 1989.

Victoria Radio Works, the current owner of KBAR-FM, purchased the facility on January 29, 1999.

On May 28, 2007, the call sign was changed to the current KBAR-FM, after changing formats from hip hop as "100.9 The Beat" to mainstream rock as "The Bar".

Sometime around mid 2018, The Bar was replaced with K-Bar and their Classic Country, while keeping the same owner. It is not known if Victoria will see another Alternative station on FM.
