= KNRG =

Coordinates: 30°00′06″N 96°49′21″W

- New Ulm, Texas; United States
- Broadcast area: LaGrange, Texas; Columbus, Texas
- Frequency: 92.3 MHz
- Branding: Renegade Radio, 92.3 KNRG

Programming
- Format: Americana

Ownership
- Owner: Roy E. Henderson
- Sister stations: KTWL, KLTR, KULM-FM, KEON

History
- First air date: November 4, 1999

Technical information
- Licensing authority: FCC
- Facility ID: 15113
- Class: A
- ERP: 6,000 watts
- HAAT: 100 meters (330 ft)

Links
- Public license information: Public file; LMS
- Webcast: Listen live
- Website: 923knrg.com

KNRG is a radio station airing an Americana format licensed to New Ulm, Texas, broadcasting on 92.3 FM. The station is owned by Roy E. Henderson.

== History ==
KNRG was issued its initial License to Cover on November 4, 1999. The facility's transmission tower is located near Farm to Market Road 2981 and Laird Rd., northeast of La Grange, Texas.
