= Victoria, Texas =

- City and county seat
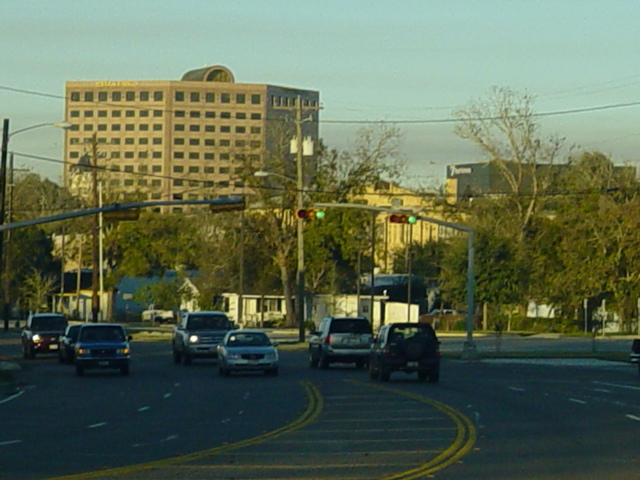
- Downtown Victoria in December 2007

- Seal

- Location in the state of Texas

- Location within Texas Location within the United States
- Coordinates: 28°49′1″N 96°59′36″W
- Country: United States
- State: Texas
- County: Victoria

Government
  - Type: Council–manager
  - Mayor: Duane Crocker
  - City Council: Rafael DeLaGarza, III; Steven Kidder; April L. Butler; Jan Scott; Dr. Andrew Young; Mark Loffgren
  - City Manager: Jesús A. Garza

Area
  - City and county seat: 37.57 sq mi (97.30 km^{2})
  - Land: 37.37 sq mi (96.78 km^{2})
  - Water: 0.20 sq mi (0.52 km^{2})
- Elevation: 95 ft (29 m)

Population (2020)
  - City and county seat: 65,534
  - Density: 1,790.7/sq mi (691.41/km^{2})
  - Metro: 116,000
- Time zone: UTC−6 (CST)
  - Summer (DST): UTC−5 (CDT)
- ZIP code(s): 77901, 77902, 77903, 77904, 77905
- Area code: 361
- FIPS code: 48-75428
- GNIS feature ID: 1370631
- Website: City of Victoria

Victoria is a city in and the county seat of Victoria County, Texas, United States. The population was 65,534 as of the 2020 census. The three counties of the Victoria Metropolitan Statistical Area had a population of 111,163 as of the 2000 census. Its elevation is 95 ft (29 m).

Victoria is located 30 miles inland from the Gulf of Mexico. It is a two-hour drive from Houston, San Antonio, and Austin and a one hour and twenty minute drive to Corpus Christi.

The city is named for General Guadalupe Victoria, who became the first president of independent Mexico. It is the cathedral city of the Roman Catholic Diocese of Victoria in Texas.

== History ==
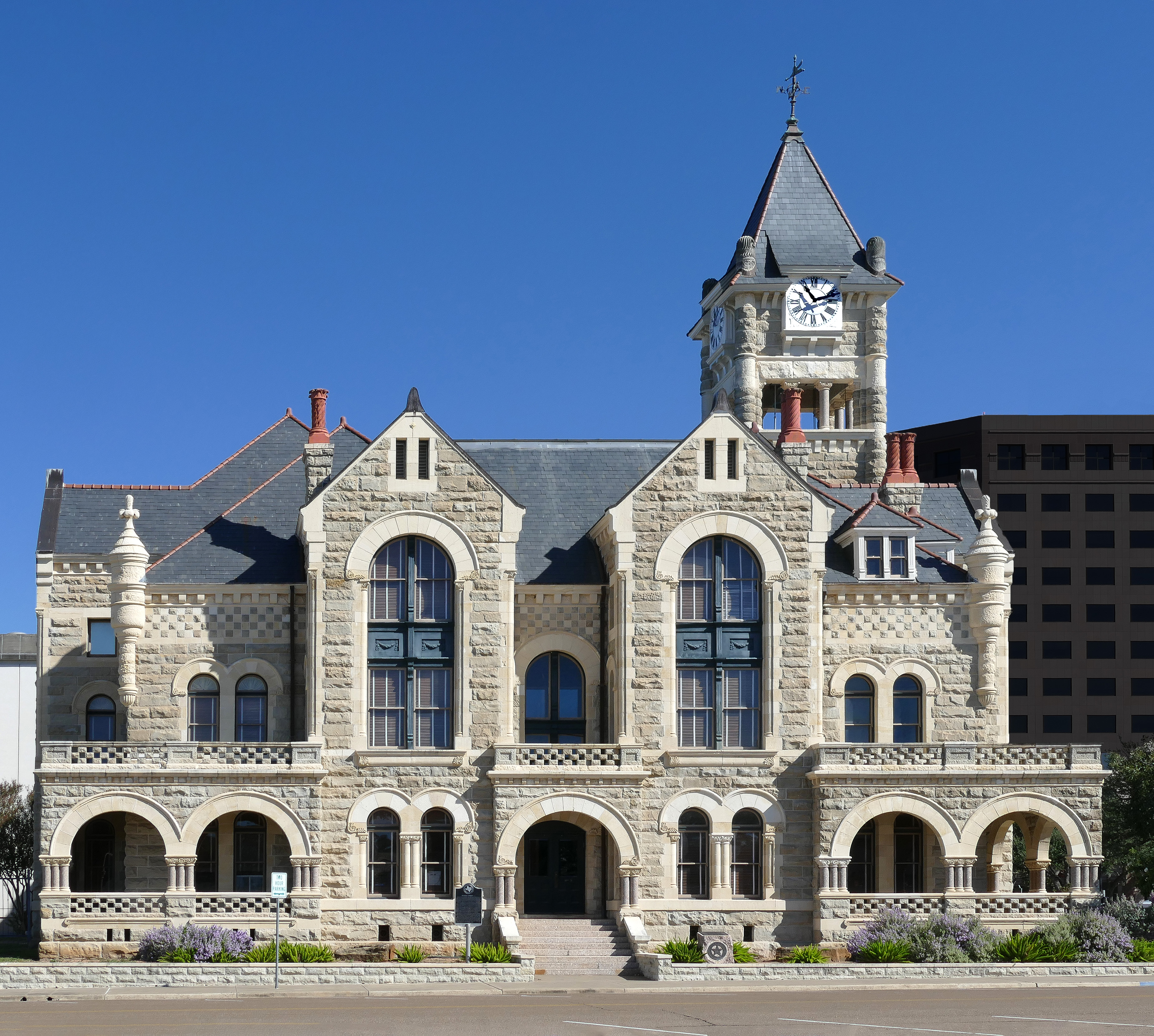
Old Victoria Courthouse

The city of Guadalupe Victoria was founded in 1824 by Martín De León, a Mexican empresario, in honor of Guadalupe Victoria, the first president of the Republic of Mexico. Victoria was initially part of De León's Colony, which had been founded that same year. By 1834, the town had a population of approximately 300.

During the Texas Revolution, Guadalupe Victoria contributed soldiers and supplies to pro-revolutionary forces. However, after James Fannin was defeated by the Mexican army at the Battle of Coleto, the town was occupied by Mexican forces. After Santa Anna was defeated at the Battle of San Jacinto, the town's Mexican residents were driven out by Anglo settlers, who renamed it Victoria.

In 1840, a Comanche raid on nearby Linnville killed many residents of the town. A cholera outbreak occurred in 1846.

During the mid-19th century, the city developed a large population of European immigrants, particularly Germans. By the turn of the 20th century, Victoria was experiencing rapid population growth thanks to its position as a regional trade center. The city's advantageous proximity to Gulf Coast ports, the larger cities of Austin, Corpus Christi, Houston, and San Antonio, and prosperous industries in agriculture and petrochemicals solidified its prominence.

Texas A&M University–Victoria was founded in 1971 as the University of Houston–Victoria Center and remains there today.

In 2017, the Victoria Islamic Center mosque was destroyed by an arson attack. A 25-year-old Victoria man was convicted of the crime and sentenced to prison. A documentary film, A Town Called Victoria, was produced about the incident.

== Geography ==
Victoria is located on the coastal plains of Texas about 50 mi (80 km) from the Gulf of Mexico and 20 mi (32 km) from the nearest bay waters. It lies along and just to the east of the Guadalupe River. The topography is mostly flat to slightly rolling with an average elevation of 95 ft (29 m). Most of the city is underlain by smectite-rich clay which is locally capped by silt or fine sand; the high shrink-swell potential associated with smectite creates major challenges to urban infrastructure. Vegetation in better-drained areas consists primarily of short grasses with post oaks and other small timber and brush. Moist sites can grow tall forests dominated by elm and pecan.

=== Climate ===
Victoria is classified as having a humid subtropical climate. June through August are very hot and humid, with high temperatures regularly exceeding 100 °F (38 °C). The record high temperature of 111 °F (43.9 °C) was recorded in September 2000. Victoria also holds the Texas record high for October at 109 °F (42.8 °C) recorded in 1926. Spring and autumn are generally mild to warm with lower humidity. Winters are mild, with occasional cold spells. The record low temperature was recorded in December 1989, when the temperature dropped to 9 °F (−12.8 °C). Snow is very infrequent, occurring on average once every 11 years. On December 24–25, 2004, Victoria recorded its first White Christmas ever when 12.5 in (32 cm) of snow fell.

Average monthly precipitation is lowest in winter and has a secondary minimum in August, with intense heat and humidity prevailing. On average, the wettest months are May, June, September and October (the last two of these due to significant threat from tropical weather systems, including hurricanes, which can produce torrential rainfalls some years).

Victoria has occasional severe weather, mostly from flooding. Hurricanes have the potential to bring severe damage to the area. Hurricane Claudette in July 2003 was the last hurricane to score a direct hit on the city. During this event, winds gusted to 83 mph (134 km/h) at the Victoria Regional Airport and 90% of the city lost power. The most intense hurricane to affect Victoria remains Hurricane Carla in September 1961.

In May 2013, a rare tornado hit Victoria on a Saturday afternoon with tornado warnings everywhere from Corpus Christi to the southeast Houston/Sugarland Metro area. A short-lived tornado took a swipe at an open field northeast of Victoria, dodging all structures and causing no injuries but kicking up dirt and debris visible for miles. Tornadoes striking the area are commonly associated with hurricanes and are otherwise rare.

Climate data for Victoria Regional Airport, Texas (1991–2020 normals, extremes 1902–present)
Month	Jan	Feb	Mar	Apr	May	Jun	Jul	Aug	Sep	Oct	Nov	Dec	Year
Record high °F (°C)	88 (31)	96 (36)	99 (37)	100 (38)	102 (39)	109 (43)	110 (43)	109 (43)	111 (44)	109 (43)	93 (34)	88 (31)	111 (44)
Mean maximum °F (°C)	79.4 (26.3)	82.9 (28.3)	86.5 (30.3)	89.5 (31.9)	93.9 (34.4)	96.9 (36.1)	98.5 (36.9)	100.5 (38.1)	97.5 (36.4)	92.8 (33.8)	86.2 (30.1)	81.1 (27.3)	101.3 (38.5)
Mean daily maximum °F (°C)	65.2 (18.4)	69.1 (20.6)	75.0 (23.9)	80.8 (27.1)	86.8 (30.4)	92.3 (33.5)	94.6 (34.8)	95.5 (35.3)	90.7 (32.6)	84.1 (28.9)	74.1 (23.4)	67.3 (19.6)	81.3 (27.4)
Daily mean °F (°C)	54.4 (12.4)	58.4 (14.7)	64.4 (18.0)	70.4 (21.3)	77.3 (25.2)	82.7 (28.2)	84.5 (29.2)	84.8 (29.3)	80.4 (26.9)	72.6 (22.6)	62.8 (17.1)	56.2 (13.4)	70.7 (21.5)
Mean daily minimum °F (°C)	43.6 (6.4)	47.7 (8.7)	53.9 (12.2)	60.0 (15.6)	67.7 (19.8)	73.1 (22.8)	74.5 (23.6)	74.1 (23.4)	70.0 (21.1)	61.0 (16.1)	51.4 (10.8)	45.2 (7.3)	60.2 (15.7)
Mean minimum °F (°C)	27.6 (−2.4)	30.1 (−1.1)	34.5 (1.4)	43.5 (6.4)	55.3 (12.9)	65.8 (18.8)	70.3 (21.3)	69.8 (21.0)	56.4 (13.6)	44.4 (6.9)	35.4 (1.9)	27.3 (−2.6)	23.5 (−4.7)
Record low °F (°C)	9 (−13)	13 (−11)	21 (−6)	33 (1)	45 (7)	54 (12)	61 (16)	61 (16)	45 (7)	31 (−1)	18 (−8)	9 (−13)	9 (−13)
Average precipitation inches (mm)	2.52 (64)	2.08 (53)	2.77 (70)	2.82 (72)	5.19 (132)	4.46 (113)	4.18 (106)	2.85 (72)	4.16 (106)	4.64 (118)	3.24 (82)	2.31 (59)	41.22 (1,047)
Average snowfall inches (cm)	0.0 (0.0)	0.0 (0.0)	0.0 (0.0)	0.0 (0.0)	0.0 (0.0)	0.0 (0.0)	0.0 (0.0)	0.0 (0.0)	0.0 (0.0)	0.0 (0.0)	0.0 (0.0)	0.6 (1.5)	0.6 (1.5)
Average precipitation days (≥ 0.01 in)	8.4	8.1	7.1	6.1	7.1	8.9	7.9	8.1	9.5	7.6	7.3	8.1	94.2
Average snowy days (≥ 0.1 inch)	0.0	0.0	0.0	0.0	0.0	0.0	0.0	0.0	0.0	0.0	0.0	0.2	0.2
Source: NOAA

== Demographics ==
Historical population
Census	Pop.	Note	%±
1850	806		—
1860	1,986		146.4%
1870	2,534		27.6%
1890	3,046		—
1900	4,010		31.6%
1910	3,673		−8.4%
1920	5,957		62.2%
1930	7,421		24.6%
1940	11,566		55.9%
1950	16,126		39.4%
1960	33,047		104.9%
1970	41,349		25.1%
1980	50,695		22.6%
1990	55,076		8.6%
2000	60,603		10.0%
2010	62,592		3.3%
2020	65,534		4.7%
U.S. Decennial Census

=== 2020 census ===
As of the 2020 census, Victoria had a population of 65,534, 25,013 households, and 15,560 families residing in the city.

The median age was 35.9 years. 25.0% of residents were under the age of 18 and 16.8% of residents were 65 years of age or older. For every 100 females there were 93.6 males, and for every 100 females age 18 and over there were 90.8 males age 18 and over.

98.9% of residents lived in urban areas, while 1.1% lived in rural areas.

There were 25,013 households in Victoria, of which 33.6% had children under the age of 18 living in them. Of all households, 43.1% were married-couple households, 19.0% were households with a male householder and no spouse or partner present, and 30.1% were households with a female householder and no spouse or partner present. About 27.9% of all households were made up of individuals and 11.2% had someone living alone who was 65 years of age or older.

There were 28,403 housing units, of which 11.9% were vacant. The homeowner vacancy rate was 1.9% and the rental vacancy rate was 13.8%.

Racial composition as of the 2020 census
Race	Number	Percent
White	35,057	53.5%
Black or African American	5,095	7.8%
American Indian and Alaska Native	519	0.8%
Asian	1,366	2.1%
Native Hawaiian and Other Pacific Islander	34	0.1%
Some other race	9,217	14.1%
Two or more races	14,246	21.7%
Hispanic or Latino (of any race)	33,938	51.8%

=== 2000 census ===
As of the 2000 census, 60,603 people, 22,129 households, and 15,755 families resided in the city. The population density was 1,838.3 inhabitants per square mile (709.8/km^{2}). There were 24,192 housing units at an average density of 733.8 per square mile (283.3/km^{2}). The racial makeup of the city was 55.2% White, 7.59% African American, 0.51% Native American, 1.01% Asian, 0.04% Pacific Islander, 17.31% from other races, 2.35% from two or more races, and Hispanic or Latino of any race were 42.4% of the population.

Of the 22,129 households, 36.1% had children under the age of 18 living with them, 52.4% were married couples living together, 14.3% had a female householder with no husband present, and 28.8% were not families. About 24.5% of all households were made up of an individual, and 10.0% had someone living alone who was 65 years of age or older. The average household size was 2.68 and the average family size was 3.21.

In the city, the population was distributed as 28.8% under the age of 18, 9.7% from 18 to 24, 28.0% from 25 to 44, 21.0% from 45 to 64, and 12.6% who were 65 years of age or older. The median age was 34 years. For every 100 females, there were 92.6 males. For every 100 females age 18 and over, there were 88.8 males.

The median income for a household in the city was $36,829, and for a family was $42,866. Males had a median income of $34,184 versus $21,161 for females. The per capita income for the city was $19,009. About 12.2% of families and 14.7% of the population were below the poverty line, including 20.4% of those under the age of 18 and 12.2% ages 65 or older.

== Economy ==
Victoria's economy is a mix of education, health, retail, agriculture, and industry. Its access to major highways, the Victoria Regional Airport, railway terminals, the shallow draft Port of Victoria, and the deep water Port of Port Lavaca-Point Comfort help to sustain a healthy environment for business. Major industrial employers in the region include Formosa Plastics Corp, Inteplast Group, Dow, Invista, Caterpillar and Alcoa.

== Arts and culture ==
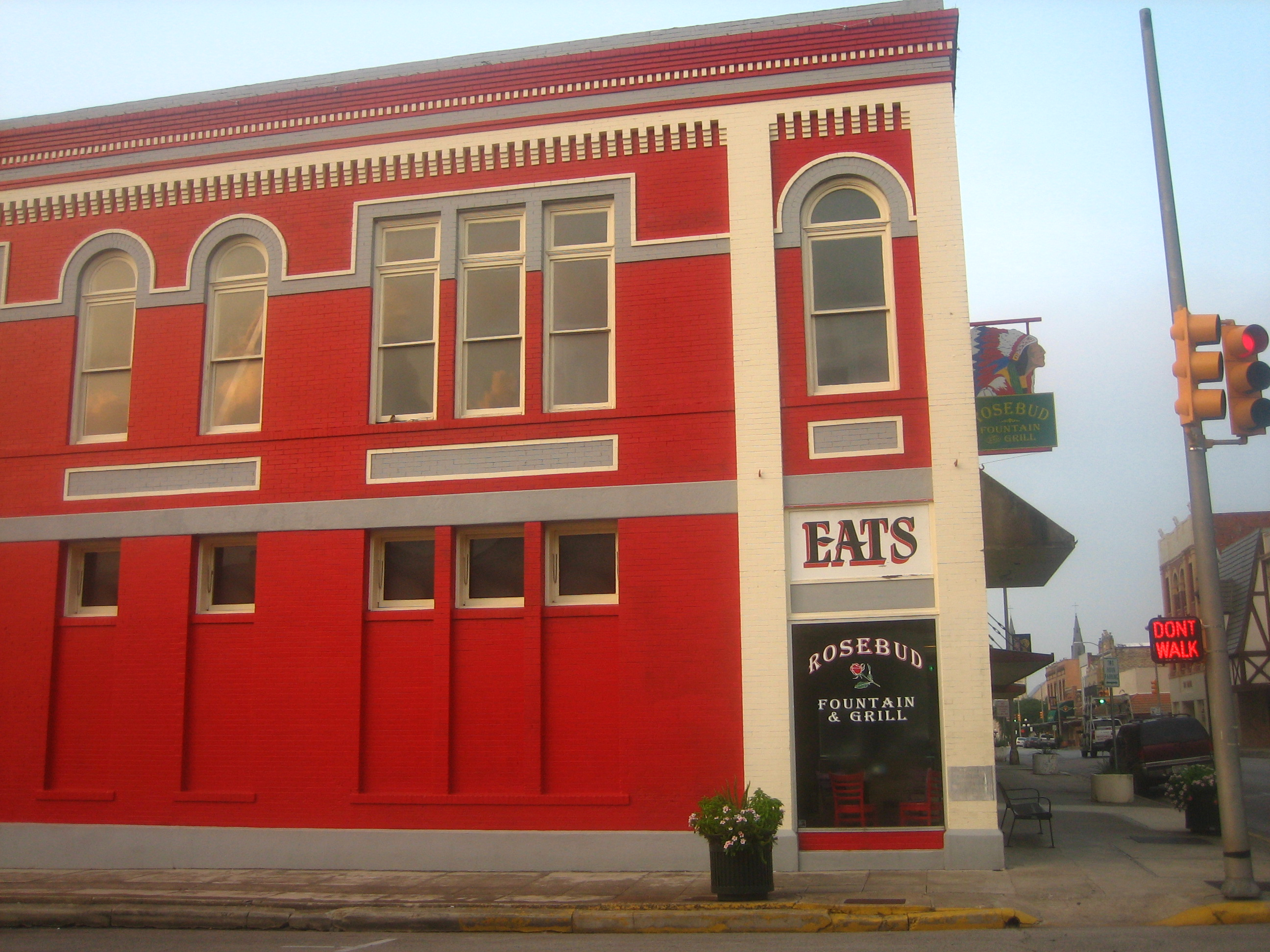
Rosebud Fountain and Grill has been highlighted on Bob Phillips' Texas Country Reporter.

Theatre Victoria offers six productions in a season, including the Victoria Symphony Orchestra and Victoria Ballet.

The Victoria Bach Festival occurs each June.

Museums include McNamara House (a social history museum), the Nave (art), the Children's Discovery Museum, and the Museum of the Coastal Bend.

The Victoria Art League is a location for local artists, and is located in a Texas Registered Historical Landmark building.

DeLeon Plaza and Bandstand was one of four public squares set aside by colony founder Martin de Leon. It contains monuments and memorials, and a bandstand built in 1890.

The Victoria County Courthouse, built in 1892, is made of Texas granite and Indiana limestone.

Fossati's Delicatessen in downtown Victoria opened in 1882.

Downtown Victoria has the second-oldest Roman Catholic Church in Texas and the first to be canonically established in the Republic of Texas, St. Mary's Church.

== Parks and recreation ==
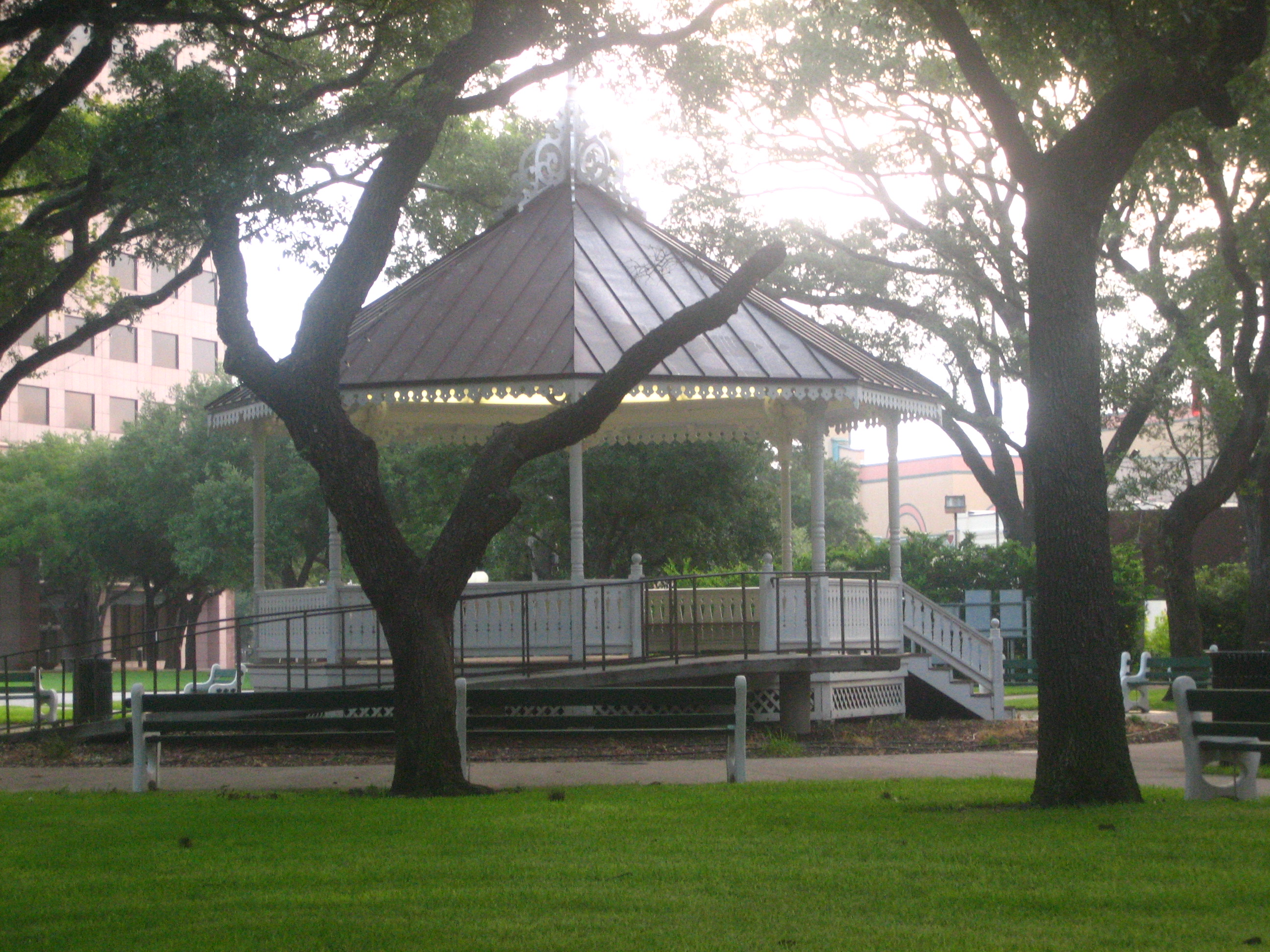
DeLeon Plaza and Bandstand

Victoria's 562-acre (2.27-km^{2}) Riverside Park is home to the Texas Zoo, which houses more than 200 species of animals and plants indigenous to Texas, exhibiting them in their natural habitats. The park is also home to more than 15 baseball fields which are occupied during the spring and summer by teams from the Victoria Metro region. Also in Riverside Park on the Guadalupe River is the Victoria Paddling trail. This 4.2-mile stretch of the Guadalupe River is bordered by soft banks rather than the limestone bluffs of the Hill Country.

Boating and freshwater fishing are available at two area reservoirs, Lake Texana and Coleto Lake. Many residents also take advantage of the nearby Gulf of Mexico. Port O'Connor, 50 miles to the southeast, is renowned for bay, offshore and wade fishing.

Three golf courses are located in Victoria: the Victoria Country Club, Riverside Golf Course, and Colony Creek Country Club.

The major shopping center is Victoria Mall.

== Sports ==
The TAMV Jaguars compete in baseball, softball, soccer, and golf as a member of the Red River Athletic Conference in the National Association of Intercollegiate Athletics (NAIA) Division I.

The Victoria Generals compete in the Texas Collegiate League, a summer baseball league. The Generals won the 2010 TCL championship.

== Government ==
Victoria is administered by a city council of seven members. The council is composed of six council members and an elected mayor, accompanied by a hired city manager under the manager-council system of municipal governance. The council is elected under four single-member districts (numbered 1 through 4), two "super districts" (numbered 5 and 6; Super District 5 overlays Districts 1 and 2 while Super District 6 overlays Districts 3 and 4); the mayor is elected at-large.

Victoria also serves as the county seat of Victoria County.

== Education ==
The Victoria Independent School District serves the city. Victoria has several private education options including Trinity Episcopal School, Faith Academy, Northside Baptist School, Our Lady of Victory School, Nazareth Academy, and St. Joseph High School.

Victoria College, a two-year community college, and Texas A&M University–Victoria, a separate independent four-year campus of the Texas A&M University System, provide post-secondary educational opportunities.

== Media ==
=== Newspapers ===
The daily newspaper is The Victoria Advocate. Texas A&M University–Victoria publishes The Flame.

=== Radio ===
Frequency	Call sign	City of license	Licensee	Format
1030 AM	KCTA	Corpus Christi	Broadcasting Corporation of the Southwest	Christian talk
1130 AM	KTMR	Converse	Siga Broadcasting Corporation	Business news/Talk
1340 AM	KVNN	Victoria	Victoria Radioworks, LLC	News/talk
1410 AM	KITE	Victoria	Victoria Radioworks, LLC	Classic hits
88.5 FM	KAYK	Victoria	American Family Association	Religious talk (AFR)
88.9 FM	K205FR	Victoria	The Worship Center of Kingsville	Religious (KTLZ)
89.3 FM	KBRZ-FM	Victoria	Aleluya Broadcasting Network	Spanish religious
90.1 FM	K211DR	Victoria	St. Jude Broadcasting	Spanish religious (KCZO)
90.7 FM	KVRT	Victoria	South Texas Public Broadcasting System, Inc.	Public radio
91.5 FM	KHVT	Bloomington	Houston Christian Broadcasters, Inc.	Christian (KHCB-FM)
92.3 FM	KQVT	Victoria	Townsquare License, LLC	Top 40 (CHR)
92.7 FM	K224EH	Victoria	Educational Media Foundation	Contemporary worship (Air1) (KZAI)
93.3 FM	KNAL	Port Lavaca	Victoria Radioworks, LLC	Country
94.9 FM	KEON	Ganado	S Content Marketing, LLC	Country
95.9 FM	KHMC	Goliad	Minerva R. Lopez	Tejano
96.1 FM	KIOX-FM	Edna	Bay and Beyond Broadcasting LLC	Country
97.5 FM	K248CS	Victoria	Victoria Radioworks, LLC	Classic hits (KITE)
98.1 FM	K251CB	Victoria	Victoria Radioworks, LLC	News/talk (KVNN)
98.7 FM	KTXN-FM	Victoria	Broadcast Equities Texas Inc.	Adult hits
99.1 FM	K256DJ	Victoria	Joe Anthony Pena and Celina Pena	Contemporary Christian (KXBJ)
99.3 FM	KGXG-LP	Victoria	South Victoria Hispanic Education Family Fundation	Silent
99.5 FM	KVLJ-LP	Victoria	Victoria Texas Community Radio	Spanish religious
100.9 FM	KBAR-FM	Victoria	Victoria Radioworks, LLC	Classic country
102.1 FM	K271CL	Victoria	Gerald Benavides	Public radio (KVRT)
104.7 FM	KVIC	Victoria	Victoria Radioworks, LLC	Top 40 (CHR)
106.5 FM	KSEJ-LP	Victoria	Ralph Salazar Victory Ministries	Contemporary Christian
106.9 FM	KLUB	Bloomington	Townsquare License, LLC	Tejano
107.9 FM	KIXS	Victoria	Townsquare License, LLC	Country

=== Television ===
KMOL-LD (channel 17) is Victoria's NBC affiliate, carrying Movies! on 17.2; it is owned and operated by Morgan Murphy Media.

KVCT (channel 19) is Victoria's Fox affiliate, simulcasting Telemundo on 19.2; carrying The CW Plus on 19.3 and Heroes & Icons on 19.4; it is owned by SagamoreHill Broadcasting and operated by Morgan Murphy Media.

KUNU-LD (channel 21) is Victoria's Univision affiliate, carrying Dabl on 21.2; it is owned and operated by Morgan Murphy Media.

KAVU-TV (channel 25) is Victoria's ABC affiliate, simulcasting NBC on 25.2 and CBS on 25.3; carrying AccuWeather on 25.4 and Ion Television on 25.5; it is owned and operated by Morgan Murphy Media.

KQZY-LD (channel 33) is Victoria's Cozi TV; it is owned and operated by Morgan Murphy Media.

KXTS-LD (channel 41) is Victoria's CBS affiliate, carrying Antenna TV on 41.2 and HSN on 41.3; it is owned and operated by Morgan Murphy Media.

KVTX-LD (channel 45) is Victoria's Telemundo affiliate; it is owned and operated by Morgan Murphy Media.

PBS programming is provided by KUHT (channel 8) in Houston and KLRN (channel 9) in San Antonio, which share the Victoria market.

== Infrastructure ==
=== Transportation ===
Victoria is located at the intersection of three major U.S. highways:

- US Highway 59 (I-69 and I-69W) is a four-lane divided, interstate-quality highway extending southwest to Laredo and northeast to Houston, where it meets Interstate 10 and Interstate 45. It is also known as the Lloyd M. Bentsen Highway. US 59 is planned to be included within the future Interstate 69 from Victoria to Tenaha (once fully completed the mainline of Interstate 69 will travel from Brownsville, Texas to Port Huron, Michigan). US 59 is planned to be included within the future Interstate 69W from Victoria to Laredo.
- US Highway 77 (I-69E) travels north from Victoria to the Dallas–Fort Worth metroplex, intersecting Interstate 10, Interstate 35 and Interstate 37. US 77 travels south via a four-lane divided highway to the Rio Grande Valley. US 77 is planned to be included within the future Interstate 69E from Victoria to Brownsville.
- US Highway 87 travels northwest connecting Victoria to San Antonio, providing access to Interstate 35. US 87 also connects with Port Lavaca to the southeast.
- US 59
  - Future I-69 / Future I-69W
- US 77
  - Future I-69E
- US 87
- SH 185

Victoria is a regional transportation hub for the surrounding counties, with local access to major large and small freight carriers, Victoria Regional Airport, railway terminals, the shallow draft Port of Victoria and the deep water Port of Port Lavaca – Point Comfort.

In 2002, Victoria Transit began operation of a citywide transportation system. It currently offers bus service on three fixed routes, along with complementary paratransit and demand-response service.

== Notable people ==
- Stone Cold Steve Austin (born 1964), wrestler, actor
- Michael Cloud, U.S. representative
- Cowboy Troy (Troy Lee Coleman III), singer
- Doug Drabek, former MLB pitcher, winner of 1990 Cy Young Award
- Kyle Drabek, former MLB pitcher
- Harvey Fite, sculptor, creator of Opus 40
- Ron Gant, former MLB outfielder
- Doug Hazlewood, comic book creator
- Bruce Herron, former NFL linebacker
- Kevin Kolb, former NFL quarterback
- Michale Kyser (born 1991), basketball player for Hapoel Holon in the Israeli Basketball Premier League
- Leo N. Levi (1856–1904), lawyer
- Polly Lou Livingston, voice actress
- Doug Mellard, stand-up comedian
- Frankie Miller (born 1931), country musician
- Royston Nave (1886–1931), artist
- Matt Prokop (born 1990), actor
- Joseph Rojas, lead singer of Seventh Day Slumber
- Jerheme Urban, former NFL wide receiver
- Noël Wells (born 1986), actress
- Bailey Zappe, NFL quarterback for the New York Jets.
