= KNAL =

KNAL may refer to:

- KNAL (FM), a radio station (93.3 FM) licensed to serve Port Lavaca, Texas, United States
- KITE (AM), a radio station (1410 AM) licensed to serve Victoria, Texas, which held the call sign KNAL until 1999 and from 2002 to 2014
