= KULF (disambiguation) =

KULF may refer to one of several stations in Texas that have carried the callsign:

- KULF (AM) 1090 Bellville — a defunct daytimer in the Victoria market; KULF since December 2009 until October 2022; was KNUZ (AM) for a time and originally KACO
- KBME (AM) 790 Houston — was KULF (with an adult contemporary format) from the 1970s until 1982
- KLTR (FM) 94.1 Brenham — was KULF 1988–2007, and was simulcast by 1090 Bellville; has been KLTR since 2007
- KEON 94.9 Ganado — was KULF 2007–2008, and KZAM before that
- KAPN (FM) 107.3 Caldwell — was KULF in late 2008 and early 2009; was KLTR 1960–1989
