= KROY (Palacios, Texas) =

Radio station in Palacios, Texas (1996–2017)

Palacios, Texas; United States
- Frequency: 99.7 MHz

Programming
- Format: Defunct

Ownership
- Owner: Roy E. Henderson; (Roy E. Henderson)
- Sister stations: KHTZ, KTWL

History
- First air date: 1996 (as KKOS)
- Former call signs: KKOS (1996–2001)

Technical information
- Licensing authority: FCC
- Facility ID: 77693
- Class: C1
- ERP: 100,000 watts
- HAAT: 145 meters (476 ft)
- Transmitter coordinates: 28°42′09.00″N 95°56′42.00″W

Links
- Public license information: Public file; LMS

KROY (99.7 FM) was an American radio station broadcasting a country music format and licensed to Palacios, Texas. The station was owned by Roy E. Henderson. It had a construction permit to increase to a Class C1 with 100 kW ERP at 476 feet AGL.

== History ==
The station was assigned the call letters KKOS on November 4, 1996. On November 1, 2001, the station changed its call sign to the current KROY (which reflects owner Roy Henderson's first name).

It was announced in June 2014 that KROY would be sold to the KSBJ Educational Foundation, but the sale failed and KSBJ withdrew their offer in March 2016.

On January 11, 2017, the FCC deleted the license of KROY. In addition, they declined the sale of KROY to New Wavo II, Inc., as they determined the license should have expired on December 26, 2010.
