= KBAR =

KBAR may refer to:

- KBAR-FM, a radio station (100.9 FM) licensed to Victoria, Texas, United States
- KBAR (AM), a radio station (1230 AM) licensed to Burley, Idaho, United States
- KBAR, the Kolkata Metro station code for Baranagar metro station, West Bengal, India
