= KVIC =

KVIC may refer to:

- Khadi and Village Industries Commission, a statutory body formed by the Government of India, under the Act of Parliament, 'Khadi and Village Industries Commission Act of 1956'
- KVIC (FM), a radio station (104.7 FM) licensed to serve Victoria, Texas, United States
