= KULM =

KULM may refer to:

- KULM-FM, a radio station (98.3 FM) licensed to Columbus, Texas, United States
- New Ulm Municipal Airport (ICAO code KULM)
