= Port of Victoria (Texas) =

- Interactive map of Port of Victoria
- Location within Texas

Location
- Country: United States
- Location: Victoria, Texas
- Coordinates: 28.69145°N 96.97234°W

Details
- Opened: 1968
- Operated by: The Port of Victoria / Victoria County Navigation District
- Owned by: Victoria County
- Land area: 4000 acres
- Employees: 6
- Executive Director: Sean Stibich

Statistics
- Annual cargo tonnage: 5,600,000 tons
- Website portofvictoria.com

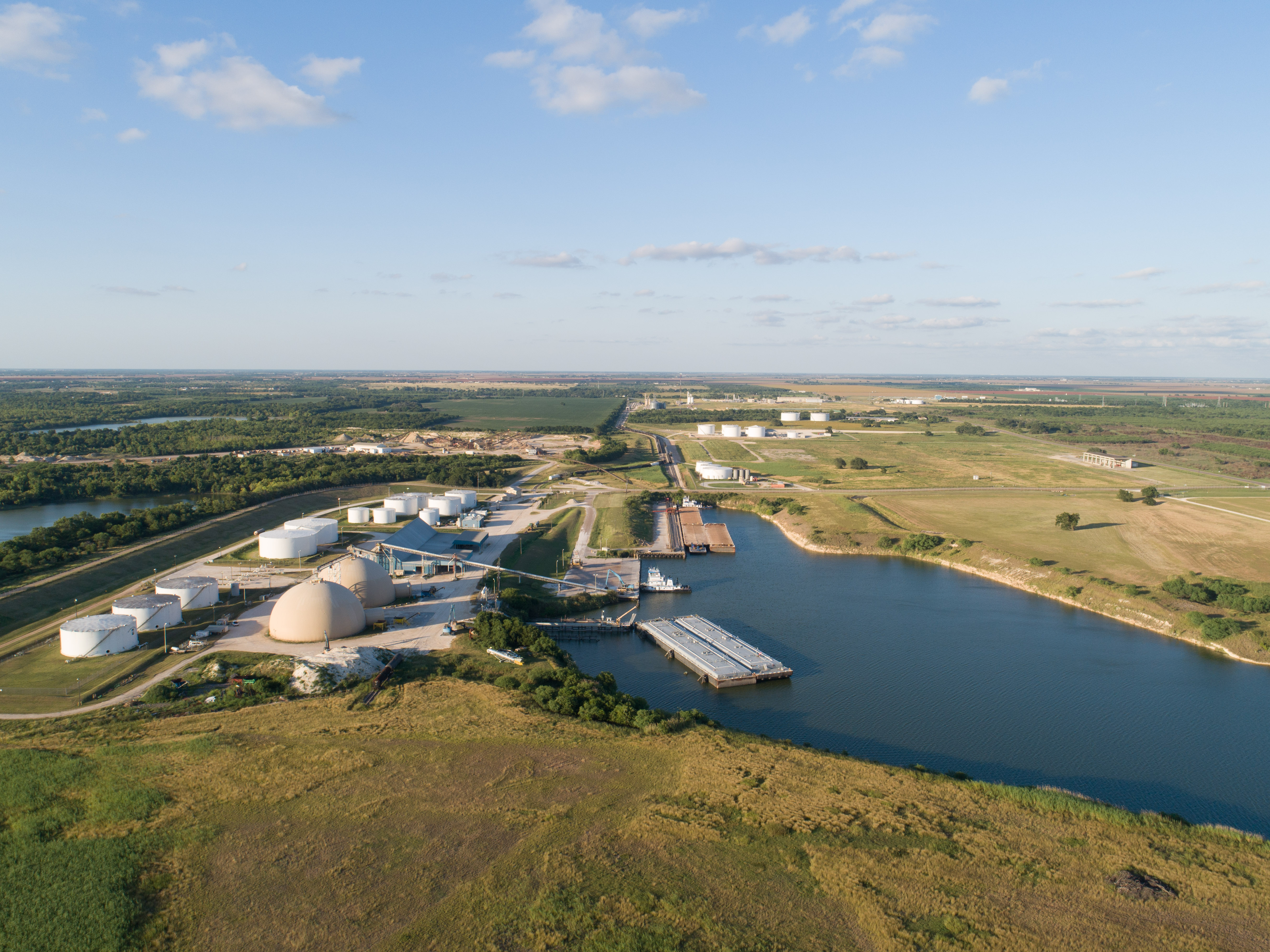

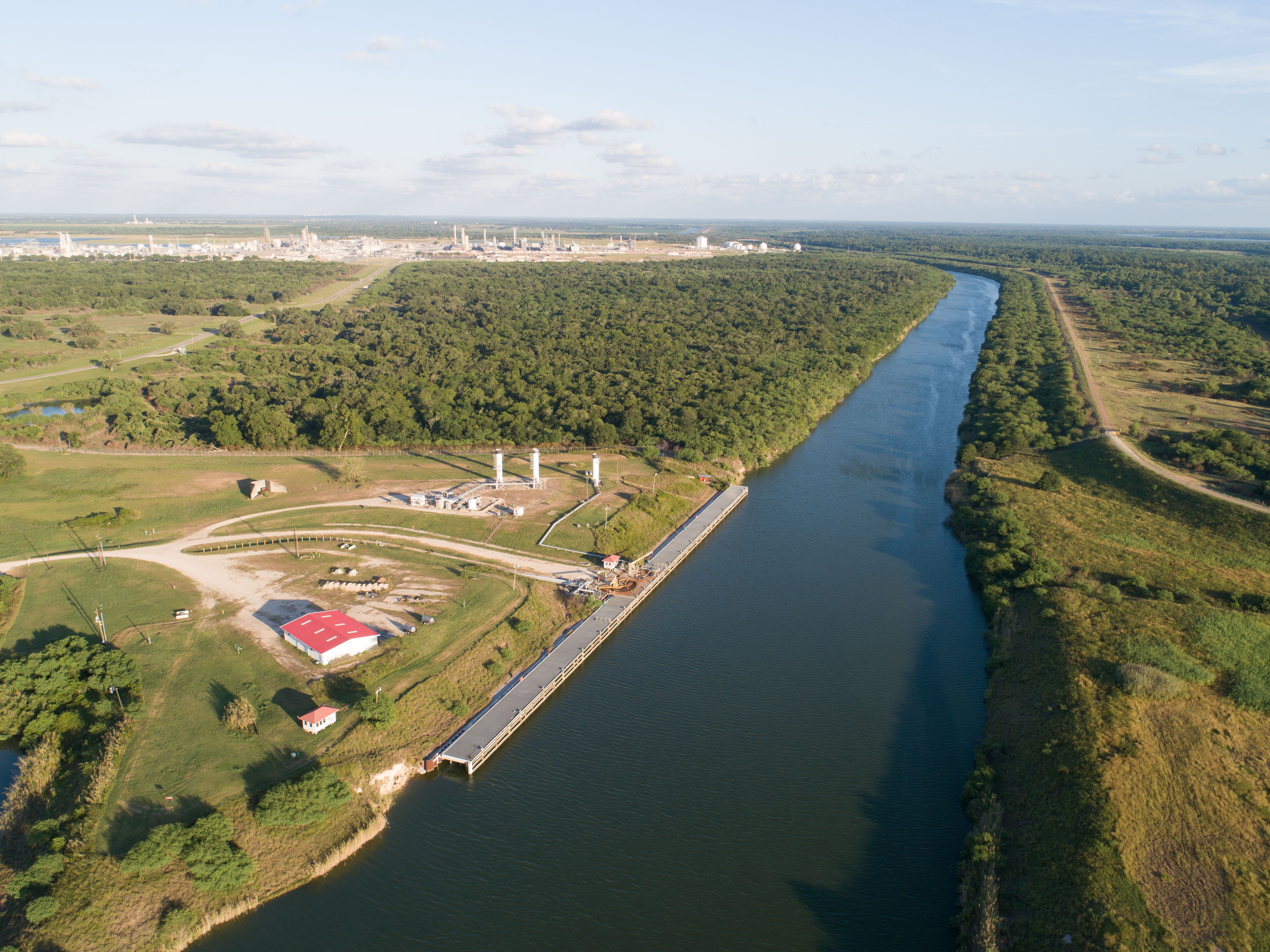
Victoria Barge Canal and Liquid Dock

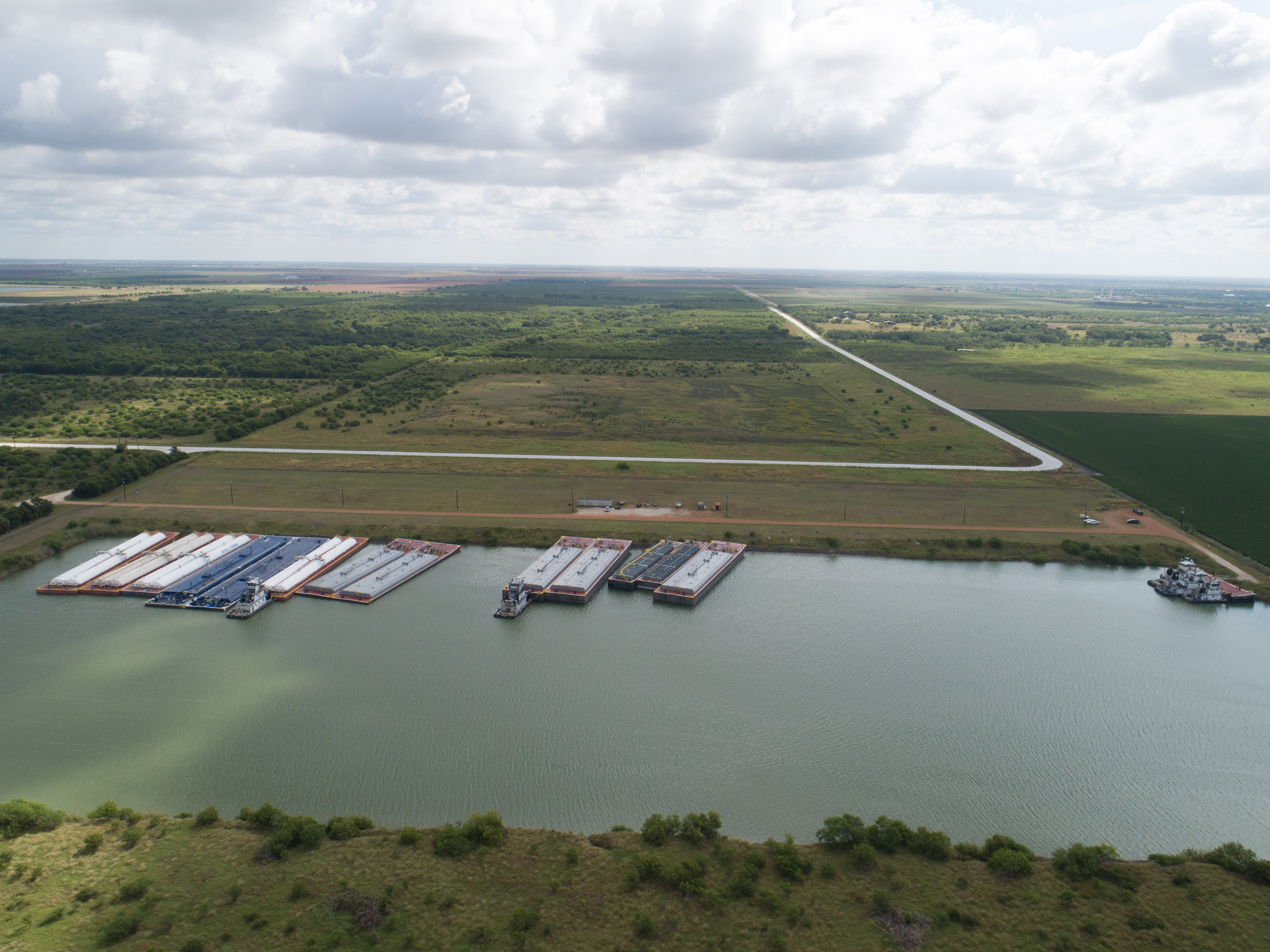
Port of Victoria- South Site

The Port of Victoria is a shallow-draft port in Victoria, Texas (United States). It was opened in 1968 by the creation of a 35-mile barge canal (dredged to a depth of 9 feet) linking Victoria, Texas to the Gulf Intracoastal Waterway (GIWW). (Coincidentally, it was Victoria that held the first meeting in 1905 which led to the creation of the GIWW, a fact noted on the Port's logo and on its website.)

In March 2002, the Port completed a deepening of the canal to 12 feet, the same depth as the GIWW, to better facilitate traffic between the two.

The Port serves the city of Victoria and the nearby regional area. It is connected by rail via Union Pacific (with trackage rights to both BNSF Railway and Kansas City Southern), by road via U.S. Highway 59 (which is in the process of being upgraded to Interstate 69), U.S. Highway 77, and U.S. Highway 87, and by air to Victoria Regional Airport.

In February 2005, the Port of Victoria and the Port of Houston signed a memorandum of understanding to facilitate barge traffic between the two ports, as a means of reducing traffic and emissions on the area highways.
