= KTWL =

Radio station in Todd Mission–Houston, Texas

- Todd Mission, Texas; United States
- Broadcast area: Montgomery County and Grimes County
- Frequency: 105.3 MHz
- Branding: Mix 105-3

Programming
- Language: English
- Format: Adult hits

Ownership
- Owner: Roy E. Henderson; (Farmers Communications)
- Sister stations: KLTR, KULM-FM, KNRG

History
- First air date: 1992 (34 years ago) (as KEZB)
- Former call signs: KEZB (1992–2006)
- Call sign meaning: The Woodlands

Technical information
- Licensing authority: FCC
- Facility ID: 21204
- Class: C3
- ERP: 9,200 watts
- HAAT: 166 meters (545 ft)
- Transmitter coordinates: 30°18′19″N 96°01′40″W

Links
- Public license information: Public file; LMS
- Webcast: Listen Live
- Website: texasmixradio.org

KTWL (105.3 FM) is a radio station that is licensed to serve the community of Todd Mission, Texas, United States. Formerly an adult hits station known as "Bob FM", it now broadcasts adult hits and is branded as "Mix 105.3".

KTWL began brokering its time out to a 3rd party temporarily airing the "Radio Dabang" South Asian format in April 2018, combining KTWL with Houston translator K287BQ Houston, which had been interfering with this facility's signal since the translator's sign on. By leasing KTWL, the clash between the two co-channel facilities was rendered moot. The former "Texas Mix" country format remained on Henderson co-owned KHTZ as a stand-alone. In July 2018, KTWL returned to its previous country format, while the Houston translator picked up the Regional Mexican "La Mejor" format from KTBZ-FM HD2, and also airs on KJOZ Conroe.

== BOB-FM ==
From 2006 to 2008, KTWL was known as "BOB FM" and served the community of The Woodlands, Texas. It promoted itself with the tag line "Bob Plays Anything," which was reflective of the broad playlist that the station utilized during the time. BOB was mostly automated in its infancy, with local based programming only running from 5am-3pm. Weaver Morrow and Jenna Rush (Jeanette Muenchow) hosted the morning show, "Morrow In the Morning". Middays were hosted by Dan Gallo, until he was promoted to mornings after Morrow and Muenchow's exit.

Dan Gallo and Preston Fassel's "Gallo Go-Round" morning show featured a variety of shows hosted by local talent; Jordan Williams on "Middays" (an afternoon show), Ross Barrington with "The Commute" (a late afternoon/early evening show); and Tom Conley on "The Drop Zone" (a program broadcast every Saturday at midnight and featuring alternative/obscure music). The station played a major role in publicizing the release of The Bracelet of Bordeaux, a family film shot in The Woodlands, with cast and crew members appearing on The Gallo Go-Round in the weeks leading up to the film's premier. Gallo and Fassel later hosted a remote broadcast from the film's premier in The Woodlands, with other station staff in attendance.

The station struggled throughout most of its existence; the signal was poorly received in The Woodlands and as a result, never clearly reached its target audience. Meanwhile, the communities which did receive the signal clearly—Hempstead, where the broadcast tower was located, and Bryan-College Station—had little to no interest in the station's programming. Most of the on-air talent departed over the course of 2007, and the format ultimately folded in the Summer of 2008.

== See also ==
- Waitt Radio Networks
