= Comcast/Charter Sports Southeast =

Comcast Sports Southeast; Charter Sports Southeast
- Country: United States
- Broadcast area: Alabama; Arkansas; Florida; Georgia; Kentucky; Louisiana; Mississippi; North Carolina; South Carolina; Tennessee; Texas; Virginia; West Virginia

Programming
- Picture format: 1080i (HDTV); 480i (SDTV)

Ownership
- Owner: Comcast and Charter Communications
- Parent: Cable Sports Southeast, LLC
- Sister channels: Comcast SportsNet; NBC Sports

History
- Launched: September 3, 1999; 27 years ago
- Closed: June 1, 2014; 12 years ago
- Former names: Sun Belt Network

Comcast Sports Southeast and Charter Sports Southeast (CSS), or Comcast Charter Sports Southeast (CCSS), was an American regional sports network for the Southern United States that was operated as a joint venture between cable television providers Comcast and Charter Communications. In contrast to its competitor Fox Sports South, CSS had a heavier focus on college sports – with broadcasting partnerships with many of the area's colleges and universities.

The network was carried exclusively on cable television systems in the region, primarily those owned by Comcast and Charter. The initials stood for Comcast Sports Southeast in Comcast markets and Charter Sports Southeast in Charter markets. However, the logo closely resembled the logo Comcast used until 2013, and it was operated as part of the NBC Sports Group unit of NBCUniversal, along with the Comcast SportsNet networks. The channel reached over six million homes in Alabama, Arkansas, Florida, Georgia, Kentucky, Louisiana, Mississippi, North Carolina, South Carolina, Tennessee, Texas, Virginia and West Virginia.

== Programming ==
CSS's main competitors were Fox Sports South and Fox Sports Southeast (then known as "SportSouth"). All three networks shared some programming, including college coaches' shows. However, Fox Sports South and SportSouth had ties to most of the South's professional sports teams, and the Southeastern and Atlantic Coast conferences as wholes. CSS, on the other hand, regularly broadcast live sporting events of some of the smaller and less heralded colleges of the region, as well as those of some of the large SEC and ACC schools (for example, college baseball coverage included SEC, ACC, Sun Belt, C-USA, and Atlantic Sun conference games). During football season, CSS produced its own feeds of many of the region's major college games exclusively for tape-delayed broadcasts, even though the games may have aired live on other networks. In 2009, Comcast debuted a version of the channel, Comcast Sports Southwest, aired in the Greater Houston area. It featured some Houston-specific content, including local high school football, Houston and Rice football, coaches' shows, and—from 2010—a simulcast of KGOW's morning show.

CSS also broadcast the Gwinnett Braves, WNBA's Atlanta Dream, Major League Lacrosse, Southern League and South Atlantic League Minor League baseball, and previously broadcast the Arena Football League's Georgia Force, Orlando Predators and Tampa Bay Storm, and some CFL contests.

Local cable systems were able to pre-empt normal CSS programming in favor of local sporting events, such as high school football and basketball games and local collegiate sporting events.

CSS aired a nightly sports talk show titled SportsNite. On most Comcast SportsNet services, this program was in a newscast format similar to SportsCenter, but on CSS, it more closely resembled a southern-exclusive version of Fox Sports Net's The Best Damn Sports Show Period.

In March 2008, CSS's owners Comcast and Charter struck separate deals with the Atlanta Braves to simulcast 45 regular season and two exhibition games produced and broadcast in the Atlanta metropolitan area by independent station WPCH-TV (channel 17). The broadcasts were available on CSS on Charter and Comcast cable systems throughout Alabama, Mississippi, Tennessee, South Carolina, Georgia (except for Metro Atlanta), and the city of Asheville, North Carolina. This deal ended in the 2011 season – due to the operations of WPCH being taken over by Meredith Corporation under a local marketing agreement, production duties for the Braves telecasts were transferred to Fox Sports South, and were instead simulcast on SportSouth outside of Atlanta; on March 1, 2013, Fox Sports South and SportSouth announced the channel struck deals to air 45 more Atlanta Braves games, ending the team's contract with WPCH-TV.

Starting in April 2009, CSS broadcast at least 25 Gwinnett Braves games over the next four seasons.

== Shutdown of CSS ==
In 2012, Comcast Sports Southwest was supplanted by Comcast SportsNet Houston, a regional sports network with major-league professional sports, in the Houston market; CSS's portfolio of college football telecasts were placed on CSN Houston, in part to encourage cable carriage in areas of CSN Houston's service outside the limited rights territory of the NBA's Houston Rockets. It was announced on March 14, 2014, that CSS would shut down on June 1, 2014. The closure of the network followed the loss of its SEC programming (which had generated much of CSS' ratings and revenue) to ESPN's new SEC Network. The final original program that aired on CSS was "Through The Years", a retrospective of the network's 15-year history which first aired on May 23, 2014, and was repeated daily until the network signed off on June 1, 2014.
