= KROY =

Kroy or KROY may refer to:

- KROY (AM), a radio station (1410 AM) licensed to serve San Saba, Texas, United States
- KROY (FM), a defunct radio station (99.7 FM) formerly licensed to serve Palacios, Texas
- KCVV, a radio station (1240 AM) in Sacramento, California, United States, which used the call letters KROY from 1937 to 1982
- KSEG (FM), a radio station (96.9 FM) in Sacramento, California, United States, which used the call letters KROY-FM from 1979 to 1984 and again from 1985 to 1990
- KRFN, a radio station (100.9 FM) in Reno, Nevada, United States, which used the call letters KROY-FM from 1984 to 1985
- Kroy Biermann
- Kroy is the stage name of canadian musician Camille Poliquin.
