= KGOW =

Radio station in Houston, Texas

Bellaire, Texas; United States
- Broadcast area: Greater Houston
- Frequency: 1560 kHz
- Branding: Viet Radio 1560

Programming
- Language: Vietnamese
- Format: Full service

Ownership
- Owner: David Gow; (Gow Media, LLC)
- Sister stations: KFNC

History
- First air date: September 1, 1961 (as KGUL Port Lavaca)
- Former call signs: KGUL (1961–1996); KILE (1996–2007)
- Call sign meaning: "Gow"

Technical information
- Licensing authority: FCC
- Facility ID: 17389
- Class: B
- Power: 46,000 watts day; 15,000 watts night
- Transmitter coordinates: 29°19′37″N 95°33′0″W (day); 29°54′5″N 95°48′15″W (night)
- Repeater: 1480 KNGO (Dallas)

Links
- Public license information: Public file; LMS
- Website: vietradio.com

KGOW (1560 AM "Viet Radio") is a Vietnamese-language full service radio station licensd to Bellaire, Texas, and serving Greater Houston. While the station is owned by Gow Media, LLC, KGOW's programming schedule is leased to a third party group to air Vietnamese focused programming for southwest Houston and areas in southwest Harris County where 1560's signal is strongest. Much of Viet Radio programming is simulcast with 1480 KNGO Dallas. The studios are in Uptown Houston one block from The Galleria.

The daytime transmitter site is located in Lochridge, Texas, across from Brazos Bend State Park. The nighttime transmitter site is in western Harris County, halfway between Katy, Texas and Hockley, Texas. KGOW used its nighttime authorization at 15,000 watts around the clock, as the 46,000 watt daytime site was damaged by floodwaters in 2016 and again during Hurricane Harvey. The Federal Communications Commission has granted KGOW Special Temporary Authority (STA) allowing it to operate at reduced power until the daytime site can be repaired.

== History ==
=== Early years ===
The station signed on the air on September 1, 1961. Its original call sign was KGUL, based in Port Lavaca, Texas. The station was a daytimer, powered at 500 watts and required to go off the air at night. 1560 AM is a clear channel frequency reserved for stations in New York City and Bakersfield, California. So KGUL had to protect them from interference. KGUL was, at one time, a sister station to 95.9 (now KHMC) and 93.3 (now KNAL).

In 1995, 1270 KIOX, licensed to Bay City, Texas, through the ill-advised actions of Don Werlinger, its owner at the time, loaded the transmitter on a flatbed truck and moved KIOX from Bay City to Stafford, Texas, without proper FCC permission. It wanted to capitalize on the money that could be commanded from having the signal closer to the Houston market, especially the high-income suburbs of Stafford, Missouri City, and Sugar Land. The station then applied and was granted a call sign change to KFCC. After the Federal Communications Commission investigated the illegal move, KFCC's license was deleted, and the facility went dark.

=== Move to Houston area ===
After it was clear that KFCC was permanently deleted, the principals secured a front "real party in interest" to take the KGUL Port Lavaca facility to Houston instead. It switched its call letters to KILE, originally operating with 800 watts from just south of the 610 South Loop, then later 5,000 watts on a simple directional system, retaining the 800 watts for nighttime operation. KILE featured an ethnic format, broadcasting in many languages. This format remained in place until August 1, 2007. That's when its owner, Gow Media, was ready to begin transmission testing from a new facility transmitting with 46,000 watts daytime and 15,000 watts nighttime.

It began airing classic hits on KILE for the testing purposes. After testing concluded, a sports and hot talk format debuted on KILE (now as KGOW) on August 20, 2007, under the name of "1560 The Game". It became the flagship station of an all-sports network, "Sporting News Radio." After a few months on the air, KGOW dropped the hot talk portion of the format and focused solely on sports talk and live play-by-play for sporting events around Houston.

=== Switch to ethnic programming ===
The sports format ended on September 30, 2017. The former "SB Nation 1560" was moved to FM, on relay translator K231CN Houston as "Sports Map 94.1". K231CN was fed by KGOW's sister station, 97.5 KFNC's HD2 subchannel, though some doubted KFNC was actually broadcasting an HD2 channel.

KGOW began leasing its 1560 AM facility to ethnic broadcasters. Most of the programming comes from "Viet Radio", a Vietnamese language radio service that is also heard in Dallas on 1460 KNGO.

=== Transmitter ===
KGOW is a Class B station, broadcasting on a clear channel frequency reserved for WFME New York and KNZR Bakersfield. KGOW must use a complicated directional antenna to avoid interference.

During daytime hours, KGOW transmits from near Rosharon, Texas, SSW of Houston, with 46,000 watts. At night, KGOW transmits from near Cypress-Katy, NW of Houston, with 15,000 watts. The highly directive nature of both the daytime antenna array (six towers, with high efficiency) and the nighttime antenna array (nine towers, with standard efficiency) means that the apparent power towards Houston is greatly in excess of the licensed power, about the equivalent of 857,000 watts days and 197,000 watts nights (when compared to the 1,000 watt non-directional reference antenna for this class of station, Class B).

This effect is shared by a number of other Class B stations in the Houston market. Houston has no Class A stations. The only Class A stations in Texas are 1080 KRLD in Dallas, 820 WBAP in Fort Worth and 1200 WOAI in San Antonio.
