= KEON =

Radio station in Ganado, Texas

- Ganado, Texas; United States
- Broadcast area: Victoria and Columbus, Texas
- Frequency: 94.9 MHz
- Branding: Texas Mix

Programming
- Format: Texas country

Ownership
- Owner: Roy E. Henderson; (S Content Marketing, LLC)
- Sister stations: KTWL, KNRG, KULM-FM, KLTR

History
- First air date: December 21, 1998
- Former call signs: KZAM (1996–2007); KULF (2007–2008); KHTZ (2008–2022)
- Former frequencies: 104.7 MHz (1996–2013)

Technical information
- Licensing authority: FCC
- Facility ID: 27619
- Class: C1
- ERP: 100,000 watts
- HAAT: 299 meters (981 ft)
- Transmitter coordinates: 28°53′23″N 96°21′42″W

Links
- Public license information: Public file; LMS

KEON (94.9 FM) is a radio station licensed to Ganado, Texas, United States. The station broadcasts a country music format branded as Texas Mix 105-3 & 94-9 FM in simulcast with sister facility KTWL.

== History ==
KEON signed on the air December 21, 1998 as KZAM on 104.7 FM. It aired a country music format as "Lonestar 104.7".

On April 9, 2014, KHTZ completed a frequency relocation to 94.9 MHz filing for its license to cover, and signing on the air as the simulcast partner of co-owned KTWL Todd Mission. The two stations are branded as "Texas Mix 105.3 and 94.9".

The relocation was made possible through an agreement between station owner Roy Henderson and Victoria Radio Works, owner of Top 40 KVIC, which operated on the adjacent 95.1 frequency. As a result of the agreement, Victoria Radio Works would move KVIC to the 104.7 frequency that this facility was abandoning, using the same power and elevation that it had used at 95.1. 104.7, on the other hand, moved to the 94.9 frequency accompanied by an increase in power to a full 100 kilowatts, and reclassification to C1. The result gave KHTZ a city grade 70dBu signal in El Campo, Bay City, Port Lavaca, and Matagorda Bay. A listenable signal can be heard from near Goliad to Sugarland.

In September 2019, the FCC revoked and deleted KHTZ's license, citing its failure to properly provide financial compensation to KVIC for its frequency move. KHTZ's owner insisted on trading its silent station KJAZ in Point Comfort to Victoria Radio Works in lieu of paying roughly $100,000 to the broadcaster—an offer which Victoria Radio Works had declined. Yet the station remains on the air as of July, 2020.

On March 17, 2022, the station changed callsigns to KEON. Around that time, the license was reinstated.
