= KVNN =

Radio station in Victoria, Texas

- Victoria, Texas; United States
- Broadcast area: Victoria TX
- Frequency: 1340 kHz
- Branding: Victoria News Network

Programming
- Format: News Talk Information
- Affiliations: Citadel Broadcasting, Premiere Radio Networks, USA Radio Network

Ownership
- Owner: Victoria Radio Works, Ltd.
- Sister stations: KVIC, KITE

History
- First air date: December 28, 1961 (as KVIC)
- Former call signs: KVIC (1961–1981); KCWM (1981–1985); KAMG (1985–2001); KRNX (2001–2004)

Technical information
- Licensing authority: FCC
- Facility ID: 28474
- Class: C
- Power: 1,000 watts unlimited
- Transmitter coordinates: 28°49′49.00″N 97°0′33.00″W

Links
- Public license information: Public file; LMS

KVNN (1340 AM, Victoria News Network) is a radio station broadcasting a News Talk Information format. Licensed to Victoria, Texas, United States, the station serves the Victoria, TX area. The station is currently owned by Victoria Radio Works, Ltd. and features programming from Citadel Broadcasting, Premiere Radio Networks and USA Radio Network.

== History ==
The station signed on the air in Victoria on December 28, 1961, as KVIC. It was assigned the call letters KCWM on January 12, 1981. On June 6, 1985, the station changed its call sign to KAMG, on March 9, 2001, to KRNX, and on March 9, 2004, to the current KVNN,
