= SportsMap =

Sports radio network

- Type: Sports
- Country: United States

Ownership
- Parent: Gow Broadcasting

History
- Launch date: 1991
- Closed: 2024

Links
- Webcast: Listen Live
- Website: SportsMapRadio.com

SportsMap was a sports radio network that was distributed by Gow Media.

The SportsMap Radio Network supplied its network affiliates with a 24-hour schedule of sports programming, including call-in shows and sports updates. Over its history, through cross-branding agreements, the SportsMap Radio Network has gone by the names SB Nation Radio, Yahoo! Sports Radio, Sporting News Radio, and One-on-One Sports.

== History ==
=== SEN (1991–1993) ===
Originally, the network was called the Sports Entertainment Network and was headquartered in Las Vegas, Nevada. Founded in 1991, it was the third all-sports radio network in the United States. The prior two networks were Enterprise Sports Network which existed briefly in the late '70s and early 1980s, and RTV Sports which operated out of Mashpee, Massachusetts (on Cape Cod) in 1987 and 1988 and was syndicated on 27 stations across the US. RTV's owner, Tom Star, abruptly shut it down and absconded with the assets and paychecks suddenly in the summer of 1988 without a word to the staff and talent.

=== One on One Sports (1993–2001) ===
In 1993, One on One Sports bought Sports Entertainment Network, moved it to Northbrook, Illinois, and renamed it. One on One Sports was founded in 1991 and delivered closed-circuit broadcasts to spectators attending sporting events such as golf tournaments and auto races, utilizing custom radio receivers. They audio coupled play-by-play commentary with special programming for the listeners at the event. One on One Sports had sports updates every 20 minutes, that it called "One On One Sports Flash". SEN/One on One Sports was the nation's first 24/7 sports radio network; beating out SportsFan Radio Network, Prime Sports Radio (based in Dallas), and ESPN Radio (which was mainly nights and weekends through the late 1990s). One on One Sports' program clock mirrored WFAN's with "One on One Sports Flash" updates at :00, :20, & :40, past the hour. During its peak in the late 1990s and early 2000s, major market affiliates for One on One Sports included KTCK, Dallas/Ft. Worth; KILT, Houston; KDUS, Phoenix; KJR, Seattle; WQAM, Miami; WNST, Baltimore. Hosts & Sports Flash anchors from the One on One Sports-era included: Art Mehring, Bruce Jacobs, Scott "Football" Franzke, Papa Joe Chevalier, Bob Kemp, Jay Mariotti, Peter Brown, Doug Russell, Kevin Wheeler, Scott Wetzel, Andy Masur, Rick Ballou, Steve Czaban, John Renshaw, Arnie "Stinkin' Genius" Spanier, plus Bob Berger and Bruce Murray hosting the 6-hour long weekend scoreboard shows from 1-7p.m. ET (Berger and Murray were also the main fill-ins for the weekday daytime shows).

One on One eventually acquired several O&O owned and operated radio stations including 620 WJWR (now WSNR) in New York City, 950 WIDB (now WSFS) in Chicago, 1540 KCTD (now KMPC) in Los Angeles, California and 1510 WNRB (now WMEX) in Boston, Massachusetts. Most of One on One's O&O stations were low-rated, but they had high-profile local hosts including Brian Kilmeade (now of FOX News) hosting on WJWR, Tony Bruno on KCTD, and Bill Simmons and Sean McDonough on WNRB, plus the flagship rights to the Boston Celtics on WNRB .

=== Sporting News Radio (2001–2011) ===
One On One Sports was bought by The Sporting News magazine in 2000, and thus the network was renamed Sporting News Radio in early 2001. The only real change SNR made was in August 2005, when it received an updated program clock and music package.

In 2006, SNR owner Paul Allen (best known as the co-founder of Microsoft) sold SNR and The Sporting News. The network and magazine went to American City Business Journals of Charlotte, North Carolina, while the three remaining stations (KMPC, WWZN, and WSNR) were then re-sold to other companies.

In 2007, Sporting News Radio moved its network headquarters from Northbrook, Illinois to Santa Monica, California. In 2010, the network headquarters were relocated once again to Houston, Texas, with the de facto network flagship becoming 1560 KGOW.

=== Yahoo! Sports Radio (2011–2016) ===
On August 1, 2011, Sporting News Radio re-branded as Yahoo! Sports Radio as part of a marketing relationship with Yahoo!. The partnership included the co-development of content for the network, and access to resources and personalities from Yahoo! Sports and its college sports website Rivals.com. David Gow explained that with the partnership, GOW was "picking up one of the most recognizable brand names in the world. We're getting access to some of the best sports journalism in the country, and we get to link ourselves together in a way that will accelerate the growth of our digital business." No financial details of the relationship were announced, and GOW remained the sole operator of the network.

=== SB Nation Radio (2016–2020) ===
SB Nation Radio, 2016 to 2020

On July 18, 2016, Gow announced a partnership with Vox Media-owned sports blog network SB Nation, with the network renamed SB Nation Radio on August 1, 2016, and collaborating with SB Nation's personalities and local sites to co-develop content for on-air and digital platforms (such as podcasts).

In November 10, 2017, VSporto, a sports podcasting network, reached an agreement with SB Nation to provide different podcasts to fill-in airtime for Saturday overnight/Sunday morning slot (midnight-8:00 a.m. EST).

In August 2019, SB Nation Radio launched a spin-off service, The BetR Network, in partnership with Vegas Stats & Information Network; the network initially combines programming from SB Nation Radio with programming from VSiN, but there were plans for additional programs specific to the network (with the first, The Lombardi Line with Michael Lombardi, airing on weekends). The network's launch stations were WBSS in Atlantic City and KBAD in Las Vegas.

=== SportsMap Radio Network (2020-2024) ===
On July 27, 2020, Gow Media dropped the SB Nation brand in favor of its own SportsMap brand, as it felt the network no longer benefited from cross-branding and had lost operational control in the process.

On February 22, 2024, as part of cuts being made at Gow Media, the company announced the network would shut down and have its programming and remaining affiliates being managed by the Vegas Stats & Information Network full-time.

== Personalities ==
Prominent personalities on SportsMap Radio Network as of 2022 included Scott Ferrall, Jake Asman, Jeff Michael, Jason Page, Ronn Culver, Tony Desiere, Brian Schaible, Greg Frank, Gabe Morency, Carla Dawson, David Gow, Cole Thompson, Elissa Walker Campbell, and Marcus Gamble.
