= Victoria Regional Airport =

Airport in Texas, United States

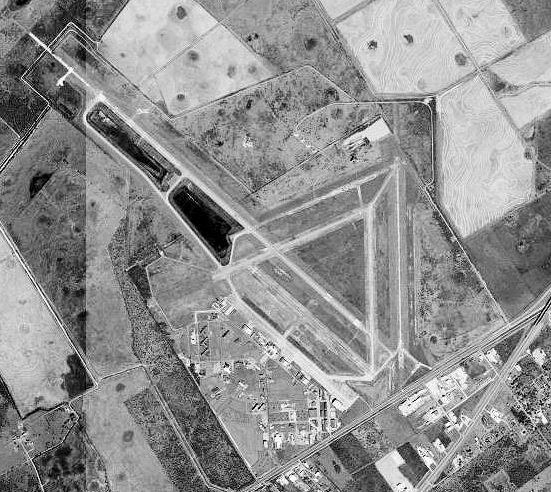
- USGS 1996 orthophoto
- IATA: VCT; ICAO: KVCT; FAA LID: VCT

Summary
- Airport type: Public
- Owner: County of Victoria
- Serves: Victoria, Texas
- Elevation AMSL: 115 ft / 35 m
- Coordinates: 28°51′09″N 096°55′07″W
- Website: www.flyvictoriatx.com

Map
- Location of airport in Texas / United States VCT (the United States)

Runways
Direction	Length		Surface
Direction	ft	m	Surface
13/31	9,111	2,777	Asphalt
18/36	4,908	1,496	Asphalt

Helipads
Number	Length		Surface
Number	ft	m	Surface
H1	60	18	Asphalt

Statistics (2019)
- Aircraft operations: 57,422
- Based aircraft: 41
- Source: Federal Aviation Administration

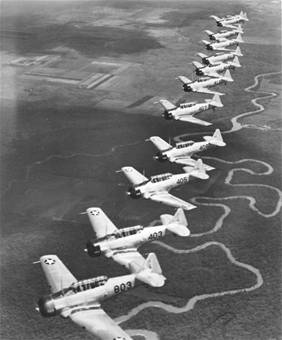
A twelve-ship formation over the Guadalupe River in the vicinity of Foster Field, Texas, summer 1942

Victoria Regional Airport (IATA: VCT, ICAO: KVCT, FAA LID: VCT) is a county-owned, public-use airport located five nautical miles (6 mi, 9 km) northeast of the central business district of Victoria, a city in Victoria County, Texas, United States. It is mostly used for military and general aviation, but is also served by one commercial airline with this scheduled passenger service being subsidized by the federal Essential Air Service (EAS) program.

== History ==
=== World War II ===
Foster Field began as a United States Army Air Forces (USAAF) facility that was established in 1941 as an advanced single-engine flying school for fighter pilots. Originally known as Victoria Field, it was renamed in 1942 in memory of 1st Lt Arthur L. Foster, a United States Army Air Corps instructor killed in a crash at Brooks Field in 1925. Foster's son received his training and commission at the base in the spring of 1942.

After World War II, Foster Field was deactivated and the site was returned to its private owners, the Buhler and Braman estates. It was later reactivated as Foster Air Force Base, a U.S. Air Force installation of the Tactical Air Command (TAC) from 1951 to 1958, during which time it operated F-86 Sabre and F-100 Super Sabre fighter aircraft and served as Headquarters for 19th Air Force (19 AF). The base closed in December 1958 and formally inactivated in January 1959.

=== Post-military use ===
The local economy suffered greatly from the closure of Foster AFB. In the summer of 1960, the General Services Administration approved the exchange of Aloe Field for Foster Field, and Victoria County Airport was moved to the latter site. The growth of the county airport slowly replaced the loss of Foster AFB as numerous businesses located there.

Two of the largest businesses to locate at Victoria County Airport were the Devereux Foundation, a therapeutic-education center, and Gary Aircraft, which repaired surplus C-54 Skymaster (military version of the Douglas DC-4) aircraft in 1968.

In 1976, Foster became the site of the Victoria Regional Airport, which currently provides scheduled passenger service to George Bush Intercontinental Airport (IAH) in Houston.

=== Historical airline service ===
Trans-Texas Airways (TTa) and its successor Texas International Airlines served Victoria for over 20 years. In 1949, Trans-Texas was operating 21-seat Douglas DC-3 aircraft (which the airline called "Starliners") into the airport with an intrastate routing of Houston Hobby Airport - Victoria - Beeville - San Antonio - Uvalde - Eagle Pass - Carrizo Springs - Laredo - McAllen - Harlingen - Brownsville. In the fall of 1966, Trans-Texas was operating five departures a day with DC-3 aircraft with three nonstops to Houston Hobby and two nonstops to San Antonio with direct, no change of plane DC-3 service being flown from Victoria to Dallas Love Field (DAL), Midland/Odessa, San Angelo, TX, Jackson, MS, Lake Charles, LA, Alexandria, LA, Fort Polk, LA, Lufkin, TX and Longview, TX. By August 1968, TTa was operating all flights into Victoria with 40-seat Convair 600 turboprops with nonstop service to Houston Hobby (HOU), Harlingen and McAllen as well as direct, no change of plane international service to Tampico and Veracruz in Mexico. Trans-Texas then changed its name to Texas International which in 1970 was flying 15-seat Beechcraft 99 commuter turboprops nonstop to Houston Intercontinental Airport (IAH).

Texas International then ceased all flights into Victoria with its service being replaced by Metro Airlines operating de Havilland Canada DHC-6 Twin Otter commuter turboprops to Houston Intercontinental during the 1970s and early 1980s with up to seven nonstop flights a day. Tejas Airlines, a commuter air carrier based in San Antonio, was also serving the airport in 1979. By the mid 1980s, Metro Airlines had entered into a code sharing agreement with Eastern Air Lines in order to provide passenger feed for Eastern at Houston Intercontinental and was serving Victoria as Eastern Express with up to seven flights a day to IAH operated with Twin Otter aircraft.

By the late 1980s, Continental Airlines was operating a hub at Houston Intercontinental with service into Victoria being flown by Britt Airways operating as Continental Express with five flights every weekday to IAH being operated with 30-seat Embraer EMB-120 Brasilia propjets. Continental Express would continue to serve the airport during the 1990s and by the end of the decade was operating 19-seat Beechcraft 1900 commuter turboprops on the route to IAH in addition to the Embraer Brasilia aircraft. By 2007, Colgan Air flying as Continental Connection was operating two flights a day to IAH with 34-seat Saab 340B turboprops. Continental was eventually merged into United Airlines and code sharing flights to Houston Intercontinental airport were discontinued. Sun Air Express operated scheduled passenger service to Houston Intercontinental via a two-year federal Essential Air Service (EAS) contract; however, this commuter air carrier then ceased all service between the airport and IAH on October 31, 2014.

From December, 2014, through October, 2018, air service was provided by Corporate Flight Management dba Contour Aviation. Contour flew Jetstream 31 aircraft on routes to Austin, Dallas/Fort Worth, and Houston, Texas.

Boutique Air was awarded the Essential Air Service contract for Victoria and began operations in late 2018. Service was operated on the twin engine Beechcraft King Air 350. An additional flight was added in 2019 to Dallas/Fort Worth to allow business travelers to make day trips. Due to reliability issues with the King Air, Boutique Air requested and was granted dual aircraft authorization from the Department of Transportation to supplement the route with the highly reliable Pilatus PC-12. Service ended by November, 2020 and was replaced by the current provider, SkyWest Airlines dba as United Express.

== Current airline service ==
United Express, operated by SkyWest Airlines, currently serves Houston with two flights daily.

== Facilities and aircraft ==
Victoria Regional Airport covers an area of 1,766 acres (715 ha) at an elevation of 115 feet (35 m) above mean sea level. It has two runways:

- 13/31 is 9,111 by 150 feet (2,777 x 46 m) with an asphalt surface
- 18/36 is 4,908 by 75 feet (1,496 x 23 m) with an asphalt surface

It also has one helipad designated H1 which measures 60 by 60 feet.

For the 12-month period ending December 31, 2019; the airport had 57,422 aircraft operations, an average of 157 per day: 80% military, 13% general aviation, and 6% air taxi. At that time there were 41 aircraft based at this airport: 71% single-engine, 17% multi-engine, 7% jet, and 5% helicopter.

== Airline and destination ==
Airlines	Destinations	Refs
United Express	Houston–Intercontinental	

Destinations map
Destinations from Victoria Regional Airport

== Statistics ==
Top domestic destinations (August 2019 - July 2020)
Rank	City	Airport name & IATA code	Passengers
1	Dallas/Fort Worth	Dallas/Fort Worth International Airport	2,370
2	Houston, TX	George Bush Intercontinental Airport	1,780

== Accidents at or near VCT ==
- On January 18, 1972, a Learjet 25 operated by the Tandy Corporation struck the ground and a power pole 1.7 nmi short of runway 12 during a non-precision approach to VCT. All 9 occupants (2 crew, 7 passengers) died.
- On December 9, 2019, a Martinaire Cessna 208 Caravan crashed 11km NE of VCT, impacting terrain because of spatial disorientation and a faulty attitude and horizontal situation indicator. The sole occupant, the pilot, was killed.

== See also ==
- Texas World War II Army Airfields
- List of airports in Texas

== Other sources ==
- Essential Air Service documents (Docket OST-2005-20454) from the U.S. Department of Transportation:
  - Order 2005-5-2 (May 9, 2005): selecting Colgan Air, Inc., d/b/a Continental Connection, to provide essential air service at Victoria, Texas, for a two-year period at a subsidy rate of $510,185 annually.
  - Order 2007-4-8 (April 6, 2007): selecting Colgan Air, Inc., d/b/a Continental Connection, to continue providing essential air service (EAS) at Victoria consisting of 12 weekly nonstop round trips to Houston with 34-seat Saab 340B turboprop aircraft for an annual subsidy of $610,049.
  - Order 2009-6-10 (June 11, 2009): re-selecting Colgan Air, Inc., d/b/a Continental Connection, to continue providing subsidized essential air service (EAS) at Victoria, TX, for the two-year period beginning July 1, 2009, at the annual subsidy rate of $1,593,922.
  - Order 2011-5-7 (May 5, 2011): re-selecting Colgan Air, Inc., operating as Continental Connection, to provide essential air service (EAS) at Victoria, Texas, using 34-seat Saab 340 aircraft for a two-year period beginning July 1, 2011, through June 30, 2013 for an annual subsidy of $1,856,692.
  - Ninety-Day Notice (March 8, 2012): from Colgan Airlines, Inc. of termination of Essential Air Service at Victoria, Texas
  - Order 2012-3-14 (March 23, 2012: prohibits Colgan Airlines, Inc. d/b/a United Airlines Express, from terminating service at Altoona and Johnstown, PA; Victoria, TX; Staunton, VA; and Beckley, Clarksburg/Fairmont, and Morgantown, WV, for 30 days beyond the end of the 90-day notice period, i.e. July 8, 2012. We are also requesting proposals by April 25, 2012, from air carriers interested in providing replacement Essential Air Service (“EAS”) at Victoria, TX; and Staunton, VA, for a new term, with or without subsidy.
