= KCZO =

Radio station in Carrizo Springs, Texas

- Carrizo Springs, Texas; United States
- Frequency: 92.1 MHz
- Branding: La Nueva Radio Cristiana Network

Programming
- Format: Spanish Religious

Ownership
- Owner: Paulino Bernal Evangelism

Technical information
- Licensing authority: FCC
- Facility ID: 51959
- Class: C3
- ERP: 25,000 watts
- HAAT: 92.0 meters
- Transmitter coordinates: 28°33′24″N 99°53′49″W
- Translator: See § Translators

Links
- Public license information: Public file; LMS

KCZO (92.1 FM) is a radio station broadcasting a Spanish format. Licensed to Carrizo Springs, Texas, United States. The station is currently owned by Paulino Bernal Evangelism.

== Translators ==
In addition to the main station, KCZO is relayed by an additional 25 translators to widen its broadcast area.

| Call sign | Frequency | City of license | FID | FCC info |
|---|---|---|---|---|
| K205EE | 88.9 FM | Barstow, California | | |
| K213CR | 90.5 FM | King City, California | | |
| K220GU | 91.9 FM | Lost Hills, California | | |
| K219DY | 91.7 FM | Madera, California | | |
| K209DN | 89.7 FM | McFarland, California | 92055 | LMS |
| K256AU | 99.1 FM | Merced, California | 91104 | LMS |
| K216FN | 91.1 FM | Oroville, California | 94112 | LMS |
| K208EI | 89.5 FM | Porterville, California | | |
| K207CM | 89.3 FM | Red Bluff, California | 89199 | LMS |
| K217DA | 91.3 FM | Ridgecrest, California | 88908 | LMS |
| K216FJ | 91.1 FM | Tehachapi, California | 89200 | LMS |
| K208DE | 89.5 FM | Tipton, California | | |
| K201FB | 88.1 FM | Tulare, California | | |
| K205DE | 88.9 FM | Alamogordo, New Mexico | | |
| K216DV | 91.1 FM | Albuquerque, New Mexico | | |
| K216FK | 91.1 FM | Bismarck, North Dakota | | |
| K206CA | 89.1 FM | Enid, Oklahoma | 89523 | LMS |
| K212FE | 90.3 FM | Bay City, Texas | 93364 | LMS |
| K206ER | 89.1 FM | Edna, Texas | 91998 | LMS |
| K201EP | 88.1 FM | Hereford, Texas | 90197 | LMS |
| K220HF | 91.9 FM | Port Lavaca, Texas | 91987 | LMS |
