= KTLZ =

- Cuero, Texas; United States
- Frequency: 89.9 MHz
- Branding: Radio Libertad

Programming
- Format: Spanish Christian music
- Affiliations: Radio Libertad

Ownership
- Owner: The Worship Center of Kingsville

Technical information
- Licensing authority: FCC
- Facility ID: 90681
- Class: A
- HAAT: 74.0 meters
- Transmitter coordinates: 29°2′23.00″N 97°19′24.00″W

Links
- Public license information: Public file; LMS
- Website: https://www.radiolibertad.net/

KTLZ (89.9 FM) is a radio station licensed to Cuero, Texas, United States. The station is owned by The Worship Center of Kingsville, and is a repeater of KLBD.
