= KNAL (FM) =

Radio station in Port Lavaca–Victoria, Texas

- Port Lavaca, Texas; United States
- Broadcast area: Victoria, Texas
- Frequency: 93.3 MHz
- Branding: 93.3 The Wolf

Programming
- Format: Country

Ownership
- Owner: Victoria Radioworks, LLC
- Sister stations: KITE, KVIC

History
- First air date: April 13, 1978
- Former call signs: KGUL-FM (1978–1983); KAOC (1983–1985); KKBH (1985–1987); KPLV (1987–2001); KRNX (2001); KITE (2001–2014)
- Call sign meaning: Victoria Barge Canal

Technical information
- Licensing authority: FCC
- Facility ID: 12179
- Class: C1
- ERP: 100,000 watts
- HAAT: 97 meters (318 ft)
- Transmitter coordinates: 28°42′21.60″N 96°48′3.60″W

Links
- Public license information: Public file; LMS

KNAL (93.3 FM, "93.3 The Wolf") is a radio station licensed to Port Lavaca, Texas, United States, and serves Victoria and the Gulf Coast area. The station is currently owned by Victoria Radioworks, LLC., and airs a country music format.

== History ==
KNAL was originally proposed by Daniel Andrus, who owned the AM facility in Port Lavaca, KGUL, under the licensee name of Calhoun County Broadcasting. The facility signed on as the FM sister to KGUL on April 13, 1978, as KGUL-FM. The original transmission site was located on U.S. Highway 87, 1.5 miles west of Port Lavaca, Texas, and a main studio location at 213 Colorado Street in Port Lavaca.

The facility was originally operating on channel 240 (95.9 MHz), but relocated to channel 227 (93.3 MHz) in the early 80s to allow 95.7 at Houston (known as KIKK-FM at the time) to relocate from Shell Plaza in downtown Houston to the Senior Road tower near Missouri City. This allowed other spectrum changes. For example, in 1995 a new sign-on of KHMC occurred in nearby Goliad, Texas.

Victoria Radio Works acquired the facility in October 1998.
