= KHMC =

- Goliad, Texas; United States
- Broadcast area: Victoria, Texas
- Frequency: 95.9 MHz
- Branding: Majic 95.9 FM

Programming
- Format: Tejano music

Ownership
- Owner: Minerva R. Lopez

History
- First air date: March 25, 1996

Technical information
- Licensing authority: FCC
- Facility ID: 189506
- Class: C3
- ERP: 25,000 watts
- HAAT: 98 meters (322 ft)
- Transmitter coordinates: 28°40′58″N 97°18′51″W
- Repeater: 95.9 KHMC-FM1 (Victoria)

Links
- Public license information: Public file; LMS
- Webcast: Listen live
- Website: majic95victoria.com

KHMC and KHMC-FM1 (95.9 FM) is a terrestrial American radio station, relayed by a licensed FM booster, broadcasting a Tejano format. Licensed to Goliad, Texas, the station serves the Victoria, Texas area, and is owned by Minerva R. Lopez.

Call sign	Frequency	City of license	FID	ERP (W)	HAAT	Class	Transmitter coordinates	FCC info
KHMC-FM1	95.9 FM	Victoria, Texas	191075	60	53 m (174 ft)	D	28°46′44″N 97°02′52″W	LMS
