= KVIC (FM) =

Radio station in Victoria, Texas

- Victoria, Texas; United States
- Broadcast area: Victoria, Texas
- Frequency: 104.7 MHz
- Branding: Hit Radio 104.7

Programming
- Format: Contemporary hit radio

Ownership
- Owner: Victoria Radioworks, LLC
- Sister stations: KVNN, KITE, KNAL

History
- First air date: January 12, 1981
- Former frequencies: 95.1 MHz (1981–2013)
- Call sign meaning: Victoria

Technical information
- Licensing authority: FCC
- Facility ID: 28477
- Class: C3
- ERP: 12,700 watts
- HAAT: 140 meters (460 ft)
- Transmitter coordinates: 28°46′56″N 96°56′30″W

Links
- Public license information: Public file; LMS
- Website: KVIC on Facebook

KVIC (104.7 FM) is a radio station licensed to Victoria, Texas. The station broadcasts a contemporary hit radio format and is owned by Victoria Radioworks, LLC.

KVIC previously broadcast on 95.1 until May 2013, when the station moved to 104.7, as a result of neighboring Ganado's facility moving to 94.9, per an agreement between Victoria Radio Works and Roy Henderson, owner of KHTZ, which was granted by the FCC. KVIC assumed the 104.7 frequency that KHTZ abandoned in Ganado, using the same specifications it had at the 95.1 frequency. Concurrently, KHTZ moved from 104.7 to 94.9 and upgraded power and elevation.

Former station logo
