= KITE (AM) =

Radio station in Victoria, Texas

- Victoria, Texas; United States
- Broadcast area: Victoria, Texas
- Frequency: 1410 kHz
- Branding: 97.5 KITE

Programming
- Format: Classic hits

Ownership
- Owner: Victoria Radioworks, LLC
- Sister stations: KNAL; KVIC

History
- First air date: May 20, 1949 (as KNAL)
- Former call signs: KNAL (1949–1999; 2002-2014); KYFV (1999–2002)

Technical information
- Licensing authority: FCC
- Facility ID: 27532
- Class: B
- Power: 500 watts
- Transmitter coordinates: 28°46′44″N 97°0′14″W
- Translator: 97.5 K248CS (Victoria)

Links
- Public license information: Public file; LMS

KITE (1410 AM) is a radio station licensed to and serving the area of Victoria, Texas. The station is currently owned by Victoria Radioworks, LLC.

== History ==
KITE was first proposed by Louis Thurmond "Culp" Krueger and his partners, under the licensee name Victoria Broadcasting Company in 1948. The facility received its construction permit on January 7, 1949, with a callsign assignment of KALO. Initially authorized at 500 watts, daytime operation only, from a transmit site on Bottom Street in Victoria.

The callsign was quickly changed two months later, in March 1949, to KNAL, which was chosen to honor the creation of the Victoria Barge Canal, which linked landlocked Victoria to the Gulf Intracoastal Waterway and other various ports around the world. The facility received it License to Cover on May 20.

KNAL received a grant to build a second tower in 1950, giving the proposed nighttime facility a directional signal to the north at dark, in order to conduct unlimited hours broadcasting by 1951.

The KALO callsign would ultimately have its own lengthy history in Beaumont, Texas as "Kay-Lo", a vital Urban voice in Beaumont's Black community.

Louis "Culp" Krueger had previously been the driving force in signing on 1390 KULP a year earlier in El Campo. 1410 would become the group's second licensed facility, with both stations programming Country music. 1410 has maintained a Country format for the majority of its existence. The station has also utilized a News/talk format in its past, as well as a Nostalgia/Standards format.

KNAL changed its callsign to KYVF on April 9, 1999, and returned to its heritage KNAL on February 15, 2002. KNAL and 93.3 KITE swapped stations and call letters on January 1, 2014, leading KNAL to become the current classic hits format.

== Translator ==
In December 2014, Victoria Radio Works purchased then 97.3 K247BZ Port Lavaca from Wildcatter Wireless LLC., which included moving up one channel to 248 (97.5 MHz) to cover the City of Victoria.

Broadcast translator for KITE
Call sign	Frequency	City of license	FID	ERP (W)	HAAT	Class	Transmitter coordinates	FCC info	Notes
K248CS	97.5 FM	Victoria, Texas	140651	250	53 m (174 ft)	D	28°49′43.00″N 97°0′31.00″W	LMS	Signed on May 20, 2014, as 97.3 K247BZ in Port Lavaca, Texas
