= KULM-FM =

Coordinates: 29.7009°N 96.5736°W

- Columbus, Texas; United States
- Frequency: 98.3 MHz

Programming
- Format: Country

Ownership
- Owner: Roy E. Henderson; (S Content Marketing, LLC)

History
- First air date: August 1, 1974

Technical information
- Licensing authority: FCC
- Facility ID: 70706
- Class: A
- ERP: 6,000 watts
- HAAT: 77 meters (253 ft)

Links
- Public license information: Public file; LMS
- Webcast: Listen live
- Website: kulmradio.com

KULM-FM (98.3 FM) is a commercial radio station licensed to Columbus, Texas. The station broadcasts a country music format and is owned by Roy E. Henderson, through licensee S Content Marketing, LLC.

== History ==
KULM-FM was first proposed by John L. Labay of Columbus, as a 3 kilowatt Class A facility in 1972. A construction permit to build a transmission tower on U.S. Highway 90, 2 miles west of downtown Columbus, was granted on March 8, 1973. The KULM-FM callsign was assigned to the facility on May 3, 1973. Labay constructed the facility and received a License to Cover on August 1, 1974. KULM-FM increased ERP to the current 6 kilowatt maximum for a Class A licensed facility in 1993.
