= KLTR =

Coordinates: 30.1663°N 96.4049°W

- Brenham, Texas; United States
- Broadcast area: Brazos Valley
- Frequency: 94.1 MHz
- Branding: 94.1 Lite FM

Programming
- Format: Adult contemporary

Ownership
- Owner: Roy E. Henderson

History
- First air date: March 16, 1989; 36 years ago (as KULF)
- Former call signs: KLUF (2/17/1988-2/26-1988); KULF (1988–2007)
- Call sign meaning: K LiTe Rock

Technical information
- Licensing authority: FCC
- Facility ID: 40775
- Class: C3 (CP upgrades facility to a C2)
- ERP: 6,400 watts (construction permit granted for 23,500 watts)
- HAAT: 100 m (328 ft) (construction permit granted for 205 m (673 ft)

Links
- Public license information: Public file; LMS
- Website: litefm941.com

KLTR 94.1 FM is a radio station broadcasting an adult contemporary format. The station is currently licensed to Brenham, Texas, with a construction permit in place to move the facility farther north and upgrade the facility to 50 kilowatts with an elevation decrease to 90 meters. This will upgrade 94.1 from its current C3 license to a C2, and will also shift its COL to Hempstead, Texas, covering the majority of the Bryan/College Station area, as well as the northwest suburbs of Houston. The station is owned by Roy E. Henderson, d.b.a. Fort Bend Broadcasting. KLTR, then KULF, began broadcasting on March 16, 1989. It was founded by May Broadcasting.

The station's studios and transmitter are located separately in Brenham.
