= WSUN (FM) =

Spanish-language radio station in Tampa, Florida, US

- Holiday, Florida; United States
- Broadcast area: Tampa Bay area
- Frequency: 97.1 MHz (HD Radio)
- Branding: El Zol 97.1

Programming
- Language: Spanish
- Format: Contemporary hit radio
- Subchannels: HD2: Regional Mexican "La Privada"

Ownership
- Owner: Spanish Broadcasting System; (WSUN Licensing, Inc.)

History
- First air date: September 1, 1978
- Former call signs: WHBS (1978–1983); WVTY (1983–1984); WVTY-FM (1984–1986); WLVU-FM (1986–1998); WSUN-FM (1998–2016)
- Former frequencies: 106.3 MHz (1978–1998)
- Call sign meaning: Originally used on WSUN (620 AM), now WDAE

Technical information
- Licensing authority: FCC
- Facility ID: 67136
- Class: C2
- ERP: 11,500 watts
- HAAT: 224 meters (735 ft)
- Transmitter coordinates: 28°10′57″N 82°46′5.4″W

Links
- Public license information: Public file; LMS
- Website: www.lamusica.com/stations/wsun; HD2: www.lamusica.com/stations/klax-hd2

WSUN (97.1 FM, "El Zol 97.1") is a commercial radio station licensed to Holiday, Florida, United States, and serving the Tampa Bay Area. The station is owned by Spanish Broadcasting System, and airs a Spanish contemporary hits format. The transmitter site is off Dartmouth Drive in Holiday.

== History ==
The station signed on September 1, 1978, on the 106.3 FM frequency as WHBS, a station that served primarily Pasco and northern Pinellas Counties. The station later became WVTY, then WLVU, carrying an easy listening format and later adult contemporary. In 1998, the station would relocate to 97.1 FM (swapping frequencies with Citrus County's WXOF), to better reach the Tampa Bay market. Soon afterward, Cox Radio would acquire WLVU in a swap (see below), and transfer its WSUN calls to FM, adopting an oldies format as "Oldies 97.1".

Mired with a subpar signal and being one of two oldies stations in the market (WYUU was the other) did not allow WSUN-FM to take off in the Tampa Bay area. While rumors of Cox flipping the station to 1980s music ran rampant, the station began stunting with music from 2001: A Space Odyssey. At 5:00 p.m. on November 3, 2000, the Tampa Bay area got its first taste of an alternative rock formatted station in many years with the debut of 97X. The first song, "Hemorrhage (In My Hands)" by Fuel was dedicated to modern adult contemporary station WSSR and active rock station WXTB, both of whom were owned by competitor Clear Channel Communications.

On January 18, 2013, the station relaunched itself with a listener-controlled format. The final song under the first "97X" era was the song they launched with, "Hemorrhage" by Fuel. At 10 a.m., the station began stunting with a recorded loop of announcements promoting the new listener-controlled format. At 5 pm, the station launched its listener-controlled format with "Best Of You" by Foo Fighters. With this new direction, the audience controlled every song that played using special technology designed by Listener Driven Radio (LDR). LDR created a special app and website for WSUN that allowed listeners to take over the music live. In addition to the music voting features, the mobile app offered several other interactive elements. It allowed listeners to record audio using the app's 'Open Mic' option, sending it directly to the station for broadcasting, sign up for instant SMS, email, and Twitter alerts when their favorite songs were about to play, and share votes on social platforms such as Facebook and Twitter. Listeners could also earn social media ‘badges’ by interacting with the station. By 9 pm of that day, the station received 31,000 song votes; and over 1.7 million by January 28. In mid-2014, the listener voting feature was scaled back, now only allowing users to vote on select new/current songs (instead of the entire playlist, as before), the results of which are featured on daily "countdown" shows. The live voting feature is still occasionally employed during "After-Concert Takeovers", where listeners can vote on the order of songs from one or several artists who appeared in concert locally earlier, and during a Sunday night show featuring local artists. In about 2016, the voting way was changed. Before, listeners needed to press 'Play More/Less' button to hear the songs more or less frequently; the update allowed listeners to vote songs up or down.

The 24-hour interactive format had a mix of compliments and complaints. Most of the complaints were about the axe of the "Morning X" show.

In September 2014, iHeartMedia launched a local competitor to WSUN, branded "ALT 99.9" on WFUS-HD2, and relayed by 99.9 MHz FM translator W207BU, located in Bayonet Point (the translator has since moved to 100.3 FM, now W262CP, and the station rebranded as "ALT 100.3"). On March 7, 2016, "ALT 100.3" was replaced with a simulcast of iHeartRadio's WRUB in Bradenton.

On July 22, 2016, the station changed its call sign to the current WSUN.

On August 11, 2016, WSUN began simulcasting on WHPT-HD2. As of August 6, 2019, WSUN began simulcasting on WPOI-HD2.

In 2019, Cox Media Group transferred WSUN, along with Orlando sister station WPYO, to CXR Radio, LLC, a divestiture trust run by Elliot B. Evers. The transfer followed the sale of the remainder of Cox Media Group from Cox Enterprises to Apollo Global Management; Cox had owned six FM stations in Tampa Bay, one over the Federal Communications Commission limit of five, and the sale eliminated this grandfathered status.

On February 9, 2022, Spanish Broadcasting System (SBS) announced they would purchase WSUN and WPYO from CXR Radio for $12.5 million. The deal marked SBS’ entry into both markets.

On March 14, 2022, WSUN began simulcasting on St. Petersburg translator W248CA (97.5 FM), which is fed by WPOI-HD2. The translator formerly relayed WTMP (1150 AM), and is owned by NIA Broadcasting, Inc. On April 26, WSUN announced they would drop the alternative format and "97X" branding the following day at noon; "97X" continues to be heard on WWRM-HD2, WPOI-HD2, and W248CA. At the promised time, WSUN began stunting with a loop of a redirecting message for "97X" listeners to W248CA, WPOI-HD2 and WWRM-HD2, as well as the station's mobile apps and online stream. On April 29, SBS officially closed on their purchase of WSUN, and shifted the stunting to a loop of songs featured in their new Spanish contemporary hits format, which debuted on May 9, as "El Nuevo Zol 97.1".

== Concerts ==
- The Next Big Thing concert series, formerly at Coachman Park in Clearwater, Florida, was held at the 1-800-ASK-GARY Amphitheatre until 2012 when the venue was changed for a third time to Vinoy Park in St. Petersburg, Florida. Next Big Thing '12 was held December 1, 2012 with bands performing such as Bush, Rise Against, FUN., Silversun Pickups and a mystery head liner, announced October 24, 2012. The concert has since returned to the venue previously known as the 1-800-ASK-GARY Amphitheatre, now known as the MIDFLORIDA Credit Union Amphitheatre. In 2017 Next Big Thing began hosting this concert series over two days rather than one.
- The Backyard Barbecue is a yearly spring concert held by 97X at Vinoy Park in St. Petersburg, Florida. This is a one-day, one stage concert series.

== 97X Green Room ==
The 97X Green Room is an annual series of compilation albums of live music recorded for WSUN-FM's Green Room series. All albums contain acoustic versions of popular songs from artists heard on the station. It was released for sale primarily at Tampa Bay area Best Buy locations, although later volumes were made available at other locations. Proceeds from the first album's sales benefited Audubon of Florida's Coastal Islands Sanctuaries Program. For subsequent albums, proceeds from the sales benefit The Nature Conservancy. The albums' goal is to provide exclusive acoustic performances and to help raise money and awareness to the needs of environment in Florida.

The latest installment in the series, Volume 7, released on September 8, 2011, includes performances by Foster the People, A Day to Remember, Silversun Pickups, Manchester Orchestra, Matt Schultz from Cage the Elephant, Sick Puppies, Young the Giant, The Joy Formidable and Grouplove.
