= WSUN =

WSUN may refer to:

- WSUN (FM), a radio station (97.1 FM) licensed to Holiday, Florida, United States
- WSUN-TV, a defunct television station (channel 38) in St. Petersburg, Florida, United States
- WDAE, a radio station (620 AM) in St. Petersburg, Florida, United States, known as WSUN from 1927 until 1999
- WTWD, a radio station (910 AM) in Plant City, Florida, United States, known as WSUN from 1999 until 2001
