= WQOS =

WQOS may refer to:

- WQOS (AM), a radio station (1080 AM) licensed to serve Coral Gables, Florida, United States
- WQOS-LP, a defunct radio station formerly licensed to serve Mount Pleasant, Michigan
