= WTBN =

Radio station in Pinellas Park–Tampa, Florida

- Pinellas Park, Florida; United States
- Broadcast area: Tampa Bay Area
- Frequency: 570 kHz
- Branding: Faith Talk

Programming
- Format: Religious; brokered
- Affiliations: SRN News; USA Radio Network

Ownership
- Owner: Salem Media Group; (Salem Communications Holding Corporation)
- Sister stations: WLCC; WGUL

History
- First air date: March 12, 1966
- Former call signs: WFSO (1966–1978); WPLP (1978–1989); WTKN (1989–1991); WHNZ (1991–2000)
- Call sign meaning: Tampa Bay News Talk

Technical information
- Licensing authority: FCC
- Facility ID: 51985
- Class: B
- Power: 250 watts (day); 730 watts (night)
- Transmitter coordinates: 27°59′58.07″N 82°42′00.36″W
- Translator: 100.3 W262CP (Bayonet Point)

Links
- Public license information: Public file; LMS
- Webcast: Listen Live
- Website: letstalkfaith.com

WTWD
- Plant City, Florida; United States
- Broadcast area: Tampa Bay Area
- Frequency: 910 kHz
- Branding: La Zeta 910 AM & 102.1 FM

Programming
- Format: Latin pop and adult contemporary music

Ownership
- Owner: Tomas Martinez and Mercedes C. Soler-Martinez; (Solmart Media, LLC)
- Sister stations: WTMY; WZSP

History
- First air date: July 1949
- Former call signs: WPLA (1949–1990); WFNS (1990–1999); WSUN (1999–2001)
- Call sign meaning: The Word of God, another term for The Bible

Technical information
- Licensing authority: FCC
- Facility ID: 26145
- Class: B
- Power: 5,000 watts unlimited
- Transmitter coordinates: 27°59′27.08″N 82°12′30.32″W
- Translator: 102.1 W271CY (Lakeland)

Links
- Public license information: Public file; LMS

WTBN (570 AM) is a commercial radio station licensed to Pinellas Park, Florida and serving the Tampa Bay area. The station is owned by Salem Media Group and it airs a religious radio format. Most of the schedule is made up of brokered programming where national religious leaders pay Salem Communications for 15 and 30-minute time blocks. Hosts include Dr. Charles Stanley, Jim Daly, David Jeremiah, Joni Eareckson Tada and John MacArthur.

WTBN's programming is simulcast on WLCC (760 AM) in Brandon, Florida, and was formerly simulcast on WTWD (910 AM) in Plant City, Florida, serving the eastern portion of the Tampa Bay radio market. WTBN operates with 250 watts day and 730 watts night, WTWD operates with 5,000 watts day and night, and WLCC operates with 10,000 watts day and 1,000 watts night. All stations use two directional antenna patterns. WTBN's transmitter is off Tower Way in Land o' Lakes, Florida. WTWD's transmitter is off Sidney-Dover Road in Dover. The studios and offices for both stations are on West Laurel Street in Tampa.

== History ==
=== WFSO ===
This station began operations on March 12, 1966, as WFSO, a daytime-only station, broadcasting with 500 watts. It was initially operated by Elwyn Johnson and his son Dan. For most of its early years, it was owned by the Pinellas Broadcasting Corporation, broadcasting a blend of album rock and Top 40 music. Under the image name of "Big 57", WFSO was a Top 40 station that evolved in the early 1970s into hard rock. On June 17, 1978 at 8:30 p.m., the station commenced nighttime transmissions, commencing 24/7 operations.

=== WPLP ===
WPLP logo.

In 1978, it was acquired by International Broadcasters, Inc. and as WPLP became Tampa Bay's first full-time news/talk station. It began broadcasting on 570 kHz on December 4, 1978. Its image name was "News/Talk 57 WPLP: The Talk of Tampa Bay". The new owners, in addition to changing the format and call sign, also boosted the power to 1,000 watts, around the clock. The station affiliated with CBS Radio News and the Mutual Broadcasting System, carrying the syndicated Larry King Show overnight.

The owners of the new talk station was a conglomerate of three investors, including Paul Bilzerian, who would later go on to become a corporate raider and still later to be convicted of securities fraud relative to other transactions, and Michael Spears, a Dallas radio personality. While the radio station had been breaking even when they bought it, it lost $1.4 million in their first year, and Bilzerian was removed from the board. Bilzerian and the other two investors bickered over finances and soon the station went into Chapter 11 bankruptcy protection, to be reacquired by Dan Johnson.

In 1984, WPLP was bought by Guy Gannett Communications, which owned radio stations, TV stations and newspapers around the country. Gannett kept the news/talk format in place for the four years it owned WPLP. The station broadcast out of a modified trailer that sat off the then-unpaved 82nd Avenue North in Seminole, and on the edge of a swamp; the dirt road and swampy location were the objects of frequent jokes on WPLP and other stations (who nicknamed it "Plop 57" in a corruption of its call letters). Popular local personalities over its ten-year history included John Eastman, David Gold, Dave Scott, Richard Shanks, Tim Coles, Tedd Webb, Ken Charles, Don Richards (a newscaster who was also the station's program director) Nanci Donnellan, Valerie Geller, Gordon Byrd, Chuck Harder, David Fowler, Sam Cardinale, who later became an award-winning reporter at WFLA (and later a reporter at WTVT), Rick Samples, and Bob Lassiter. Among the news people who cut their teeth at WPLP in the early days are John McConnell, Terry McElhatton, Dave Hayes and Steve Triggs.

Although WPLP was the first talk radio station in Tampa Bay, it struggled in the market. It briefly had competition in WNSI from August 1981 to December 1982, but after WNSI changed its format WPLP went head-to-head with WFLA, a station with a more powerful signal and larger budget that routinely beat WPLP in the ratings after it switched to news/talk in 1986. It was only in the mid-1980s, when David Fowler and Bob Lassiter arrived, that WPLP became genuinely competitive. Fowler and his morning-show competition at WFLA (first Jack Ellery, then Dick Norman) swapped ratings victories, while Bob Lassiter won his timeslots in every Arbitron ratings book with double his competitors' numbers before departing for WFLA in September 1987.

WPLP was what is known as a "pig" in the radio industry: a low-budget station with little financial success and a poor signal—one that didn't even reach as far as Tampa in inclement weather (partly because Cuban state radio broadcast on the same frequency. In 1986 Gannett applied for a power increase which, at the time, was limited to 5,000 watts day and night for this frequency by developing a new 6-tower array north of Tampa. But at nighttime, in violation of the international broadcast regulations; the station received interference from a Cuban station. While the FCC was considering the power increase Gannett petitioned for additional nighttime power of 10,000 watts based on similar request at Gannett's Miami station WINZ. WPLP became the first station that had more power at night than day. The station installed a pair of 10,000-watt Continental transmitters and phasor. The day and night signal covered from north of Tampa all the way to Sarasota, that solved the Cuban interference problem over the market. Despite Gannett and the staff's best efforts, WPLP had a tremendously hard time selling advertising time. Their target audience was Tampa Bay's sizable population of retirees; while that audience gave the station a loyal following, it was outside the 25-54 age group that is the most important demographic for advertisers. Yet even when Lassiter ruled the airwaves, its sales staff had a very few clients (and those were often threatened with boycotts by opponents of the controversial and caustic Lassiter).

=== WTKN ===
In 1987, Gannett negotiated with Susquehanna Radio Corporation to purchase WHVE to pair with WPLP and WKIS in Orlando to pair up with Gannett's WSSP. Gannett would then have AM–FM combos in both Tampa and Orlando to go along with their Miami stations, WINZ-AM-FM. The final arrangement was to transfer WPLP to Susquehanna and WKIS to Gannett, which became effective on March 4, 1988. Susquehanna fired several staffers (including David Fowler and Don Richards), and applied for new call letters. Within one month, WPLP had ceased to exist. All but one (John Eastman) of its air staff had been released, new offices and studio were found in St. Petersburg, and the station had become WTKN — standing for "Now We're TalKiN", the station's new tag line. However, the station quickly lost its until-then-competitive ratings; in its first full Arbitron period, Summer 1988, WTKN achieved a 0.2 overall market share.

=== WHNZ ===
In 1991, the station was acquired by Paxson Broadcasting, a company started by Florida multi-millionaire Bud Paxson after he sold the Home Shopping Network. Paxson switched the format to business news and talk, changing the callsign to WHNZ for "Wins Radio", implying that if you listened to the station, you would win at business.

In 1998, Clear Channel Communications bought WHNZ in anticipation of a three-way frequency swap, also involving WSAA (620 AM) and WDAE (1250 AM). On January 1, 2000, Clear Channel changed WSAA's call sign to WDAE, picking up the all-sports format heard on the previous WDAE; the previous WDAE took the WHNZ call sign and business talk format heard on the previous WHNZ; with the previous WHNZ adopting the WTBN call sign, standing for Tampa Bay News, and picking up a talk radio format.

=== WTBN and WTWD ===
By the following year, Salem Communications had bought the station, keeping the WTBN call letters but switching the format to Christian radio. In July 2000, Salem had also bought AM 910 in Plant City, which had been running its own sports talk format. Salem's religious format had begun on WTWD several months before it debuted on WTBN.

WTWD first signed on in July 1949. At the time, it was WPLA, broadcasting on 1570 kHz, transmitting with 500 watts, daytime-only. By the 1960s, it had moved to its current frequency of 910 kHz, with 1,000 watts, but still as a daytimer, playing country music. By the 1980s, the station had gotten nighttime authorization, also at 1,000 watts. In the 1990s, it was sports talk WFNS, boosted to 5,000 watts fulltime, before it was bought by Salem and converted to Christian radio, in 2000.

WTBN and WTWD previously broadcast two shows hosted by Gary Gauthier, It's God's Money and All About Florida Real Estate, until Gauthier was arrested in January 2014 for running a Ponzi scheme from 2005 until 2010, which allegedly allowed Gauthier and a partner to bilk $6 million from the retirement savings of at least 38 people.

Salem agreed to sell WTWD to Solmart Media, owner of WTMY in Sarasota and WZSP in Nocatee, for $700,000 in September 2023. Following the sale's completion, on December 14, WTWD broke from the simulcast with WTBN and launched a regional Mexican format as "La Numero Uno", a branding shared with WTMY and an HD Radio subchannel of WZSP. As of December 12, 2025, WTWD has changed its format to a hybrid Latin pop/English-language adult contemporary format as "La Zeta", modeled after Miami's WMIA-FM.
