= The Tampa Times =

The Tampa Times may refer to:

- The Tampa Times or Tampa Daily Times, a daily newspaper published in Tampa, Florida, from 1893 to 1982
- The Tampa Bay Times, a newspaper published in St. Petersburg, Florida, since 1884
