= WHNZ =

- Tampa, Florida; United States
- Broadcast area: Tampa Bay Area
- Frequency: 1250 kHz
- Branding: 1250 & 105.9 WHNZ

Programming
- Format: Talk radio
- Affiliations: Bloomberg Radio; Compass Media Networks; Premiere Networks

Ownership
- Owner: iHeartMedia; (iHM Licenses, LLC)
- Sister stations: WDAE; WDAE-FM; WFLA; WFLZ-FM; WFUS; WMTX; WXTB

History
- First air date: May 15, 1922
- Former call signs: WDAE (1922–2000)

Technical information
- Licensing authority: FCC
- Facility ID: 23077
- Class: B
- Power: 25,000 watts (day); 5,900 watts (night)
- Transmitter coordinates: 28°1′14″N 82°36′34″W
- Translator: 105.9 W290BJ (West Tampa)
- Repeater: 100.7 WMTX-HD2 (Tampa)

Links
- Public license information: Public file; LMS
- Webcast: Listen live (via iHeartRadio)
- Website: whnz.iheart.com

WHNZ (1250 AM) is a commercial radio station licensed to Tampa, Florida, United States. Owned by iHeartMedia, the station airs a talk and business format. The station's studios are located on West Gandy Boulevard in South Tampa.

The transmitter site is off Memorial Highway in Town 'n' Country, Florida, co-located with WFLA. WHNZ programming is also heard on 250-watt FM translator 105.9 W290BJ in West Tampa.

== History ==
On December 1, 1921, the U.S. Department of Commerce, which regulated radio at this time, adopted the first regulations formally establishing a broadcasting station category, which set aside the wavelength of 360 meters (833 kHz) for entertainment broadcasts, and 485 meters (619 kHz) for market and weather reports.

On May 15, 1922, the Tampa Times, an afternoon daily newspaper, was issued a license for operation on both the 365 and 485-meter wavelengths. The call sign, WDAE, was randomly assigned from a sequential roster of available call letters. WDAE was the second Florida broadcasting station licensed under the new regulations, following WCAN in Jacksonville, which was authorized seven days earlier, and, after a series of test transmissions, made its formal debut on May 17. WCAN was deleted on October 26, 1922. (Note: Some sources have listed WQAM in Miami as Florida's oldest station, with varying claims of a history dating back to as early as 1920, however Federal Communications Commission records report WQAM's "Date First Licensed" as January 23, 1923.)

WDAE, as most early radio stations, broadcast on several frequencies during its beginning years, settling on AM 1250 by 1941. In 1947, still owned by the newspaper, it added an FM station, WDAE-FM 105.7.

Through the 1940s and 1950s, WDAE-AM-FM were CBS Radio Network affiliates, carrying its dramas, comedies, news, sports, soap operas, game shows and big band remotes during the Golden Age of Radio. In the late 1960s, WDAE-FM switched to beautiful music, while the AM station was a popular Top 40 station.

WDAE aired the popular talk show "Desperate & Dateless" on Friday nights with host Rosemary Haddad and producer Sam Cardinale. In the 1980s, as Top 40 listening switched to FM, WDAE changed to an oldies format. By the 1990s, it had moved to adult standards and later began simulcasting the adult contemporary music format of co-owned WUSA-FM 100.7 in November 1990.

In March 1994, WDAE switched to classic country as "Country Gold Froggy 1250" with former WUSA personalities whose on-air names became I.B. Green, Jimmy Hoppa and Davey Croakett.

In 1999, the station was acquired by Clear Channel Communications, the previous name of current owner iHeartMedia. Clear Channel switched WDAE to a sports radio format as "The Sports Animal".

=== Changes in frequencies ===
On Jannuary 1, 2000, WDAE's sports format and call sign moved to AM 620. WHNZ's business format and call sign moved from AM 570 to AM 1250. Clear Channel put a news/talk format on AM 570, giving it the call sign WTBN, which stood for "Tampa Bay News". The following year, Salem Communications took over AM 570, installing a Christian radio format, heard currently on WTBN.

WHNZ was the flagship station of the Tampa Bay Rays baseball team from 2005 to 2008, now heard on WDAE. As of 2011, WHNZ airs select sporting events moved from WDAE or WFLA due to schedule conflicts. Beginning on May 19, 2018, WHNZ became the radio home of the Tampa Bay Rowdies.

Weekday mornings began with This Morning, America's First News with Gordon Deal. In afternoon drive time, WHNZ carried The Todd Schnitt Show. (Schnitt for many years was a host on co-owned WFLA. His syndicated show aired in Tampa Bay on WHNZ live at 3 p.m. and was replayed on WFLA at 6 p.m.). At night, WHNZ carried Fox Sports Radio. Brokered programs on money, business and health were heard in middays, evenings and weekends. CBS Radio News began most daytime hours.

=== Spanish talk and English talk ===
On July 26, 2021, WHNZ changed its format to Spanish-language news/talk, branded as "Acción 1250". It had been simulcast with WRSO in the Orlando area.

Previous logo

On January 11, 2024, WHNZ switched back from Spanish news/talk to a mix of English-language talk and business news, branded as "Impact Radio". The station began carrying a mix of financial news and information from Bloomberg Radio along with syndicated talk shows not airing on WFLA.

== Programming ==
WHNZ carries a mixture of nationally syndicated talk programs and financial news from Bloomberg Radio.

== See also ==
- List of initial AM-band station grants in the United States
