= WFLZ-FM =

Contemporary hit radio station in Tampa, Florida

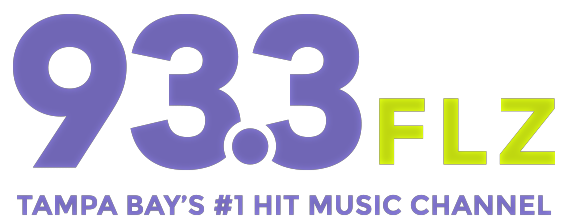
- Tampa, Florida; United States
- Broadcast area: Tampa Bay area
- Frequency: 93.3 MHz (HD Radio)
- RDS: 93-3 FLZ
- Branding: 93.3 FLZ

Programming
- Language: English
- Format: Contemporary hit radio
- Subchannels: HD2: Pride Radio
- Affiliations: iHeartRadio; Premiere Networks

Ownership
- Owner: iHeartMedia; (iHM Licenses, LLC)
- Sister stations: WDAE; WDAE-FM; WFLA; WFUS; WHNZ; WMTX; WXTB

History
- First air date: 1948
- Former call signs: WFLA-FM (1948–1981); WOJC (1981–1984); WFLA-FM (1984–1985); WPDS (1985–1987)
- Call sign meaning: "Florida Z"

Technical information
- Licensing authority: FCC
- Facility ID: 29732
- Class: C
- ERP: 100,000 watts (analog); 3,860 watts (digital)
- HAAT: 472 meters (1,549 ft)
- Transmitter coordinates: 27°49′10.8″N 82°15′38″W

Links
- Public license information: Public file; LMS
- Webcast: Listen live (via iHeartRadio)
- Website: 933flz.iheart.com

WFLZ-FM (93.3 MHz) is a commercial radio station in Tampa, Florida. It airs a contemporary hit radio (CHR/Top 40) format and is owned and operated by iHeartMedia. The station's studios and offices are located on Gandy Boulevard in South Tampa. Local DJs are heard on weekdays, with syndicated shows, including American Top 40 with Ryan Seacrest, the iHeartRadio Countdown and On The Move with Enrique Santos, heard on weekends.

WFLZ has an effective radiated power (ERP) of 97,000 watts. The transmitter is off Rhodine Road in Riverview, Florida, amid other towers for Tampa-area TV and FM stations. WFLZ-FM broadcasts in the HD Radio format; the HD2 subchannel carries Pride Radio, an iHeart service for LGBTQ listeners, while the HD3 subchannel formerly carried Evolution, iHeartMedia's dance music/EDM service.

== History ==
=== Early years ===
In 1948, the station signed on as WFLA-FM, one of Tampa Bay's and Florida's earliest FM stations. (An early FM station at 105.9 in Tampa that is today WMTX went on the air in 1947.) WFLA-FM mostly simulcast the programming from AM sister station WFLA. WFLA-AM-FM were affiliates of the NBC Radio Network, carrying its dramas, comedies, news and sports. The stations were owned by the Tribune Company, which also owned the daily newspaper, The Tampa Tribune. In 1955, a TV station was added, WFLA-TV, which carried NBC television programming, since the radio stations were NBC affiliates.

In the 1960s, WFLA-FM ended the simulcast with the AM, switching to beautiful music. It played quarter-hour sweeps of instrumental cover versions of popular songs, Broadway and Hollywood show tunes. In 1966, the Tribune and its three stations were sold to Richmond Newspapers, which became Media General in 1969.

=== Country, AC, and oldies ===
In 1981, it changed to a country music format, as WOJC, "Orange Country 93". However, it was unable to compete against country powerhouses at the time, WSUN and WQYK-FM.

On March 19, 1984, it changed again to adult contemporary music, bringing back the WFLA-FM call sign and using the name "93 FLA". While it was a little more successful, it still faced competition from WNLT and WIQI. It was then reformatted into WPDS ("Paradise 93") on September 26, 1985, playing soft adult contemporary music.

The FM station changed its call letters to WFLZ in October 1987. The next year, WFLA and WFLZ were both purchased by Jacor Broadcasting. On July 25, 1988, the station dropped adult contemporary and flipped to 1960s and 1970s oldies as "Z93". The oldies format lasted only a year. The Tampa Bay radio landscape change was influenced by a St. Petersburg Times "Favorite DJ" contest. A disc jockey on a small AM station, WHBO, won. Most radio insiders thought one of the DJs from the area's popular and dominant Top 40/CHR station WRBQ-FM, known as "Q105", would gather the most votes. The executives at Jacor saw that WRBQ, which, up to that point, had been the dominant FM Top 40 leader in Tampa for about 15 years, might be vulnerable from another full-power FM station playing contemporary hits.

=== The Power Pig ===
During a week of stunting in September 1989, including an hour of an urban contemporary micro-format, Z93 DJs demanded that Q105 pay them up to $4 million if they wanted to remain the only Top 40 station in the Tampa Bay market. Q105 ignored the demands of Z93, as well as daily newspapers such as the Tampa Times and local Tampa television news coverage that the ransom request was receiving.

At 8:15 a.m. on September 25, Z93 DJs Jack Harris and Dr. Don Carpenter called Q105's owner, Gary Edens, at a private hotel room on the West Coast (5:15 am. Gary's time), waking him up to offer him one last chance to pay the $4 million ransom to keep Z93 from switching to Top 40. Live on 93.3 then, Edens finally responded: "Come on guys! Looking forward to it. Let's go! Have a happy day!" This was followed by four sample clips of the songs: "The Last Time" by The Rolling Stones, "Hello, Goodbye" by The Beatles, "Too Late to Turn Back Now" by the Cornelius Brothers & Sister Rose, and "Na Na Hey Hey Kiss Him Goodbye" by Steam. After a minute-stunt of sound effects of electric wires and pigs squealing, Power 93, The Power Pig would then be launched, with "Cold Hearted" by Paula Abdul being the first song played. The station aggressively targeted Q105 with promotions such as handing out "Screw The Q" T-shirts at various on-the-street events. Within 71 days of the format flip, "The Power Pig" had overtaken "Q105" in the Tampa market ratings, and eventually led to WRBQ flipping to country in June 1993. The Power Pig was co-created by Randy Michaels, operations manager Marc Chase, and Michael Albl, who originally conceived the marketing concept.

=== 93-3 FLZ ===
In March 1995, "The Power Pig" branding was dropped as the station re-branded as "93-3 FLZ", using the slogan "The New Music Revolution". WFLZ evening disc jockey Bubba the Love Sponge had his show also airing for a couple of hours a day on a station in Jacksonville. For a few months, WFLZ was simulcast on co-owned KHTS-FM in San Diego while a new CHR format was created for that market.

In 1998, Jacor Broadcasting was acquired by Clear Channel Communications (now iHeartMedia). That put WFLZ under the same roof as its former competitor, WRBQ, until that station was sold off to Infinity Broadcasting in 1999. This created an awkward situation, as some of the staff of WRBQ, who were subject to personal attacks from WFLZ, had moved to higher positions in Clear Channel that oversaw their old rivals at WFLZ.

In 2000, the station underwent a slight re-imaging, adopting a new logo and the slogan "The #1 Hit Music Channel." Longtime morning man and operations manager BJ Harris left WFLZ for a station in Cincinnati to do afternoons and PD work. WFLZ was the flagship station for the MJ Morning Show hosted by Todd Schnitt, which was also aired on other Clear Channel FM stations in Florida and Missouri.

In 2004, it earned the "CHR Station of the Year" and "CHR Personality of the Year" (for Kane) awards in the Radio Music Awards. In 2011, it was named FMQB "CHR Station of the Year".

On January 19, 2012, Clear Channel announced that after 18 years, the MJ Morning Show would be discontinued. The final broadcast was on February 17, 2012. Clear Channel announced that the Kane Show would take over the morning spot.

On April 4, 2014, radio DJs Jeff Daly and Josh Foreman, also known as Ratboy and Staypuff, announced they would be moving to Philadelphia to host an afternoon-drive slot from 3 to 7 at co-owned Top 40 station WIOQ. Radio DJ Nathan "Brody" Halegua took over the slot from 7 pm to midnight on April 7.

On October 30, 2015, at 3:00 pm, WFLZ temporarily changed its name to "Taylor 93.3" to honor Taylor Swift. The last concert on her 1989 World Tour in the U.S. was in Tampa at Raymond James Stadium.

On April 11, 2020, the Kane Show ended. After over a month of running with no morning DJ, iHeart announced that "THEjoeSHOW", hosted by Joe Carballo, Ashley Nics and Producer Jed from sister station WKQI in Detroit, would host mornings beginning June 1.

On January 25, 2021, to celebrate the Tampa Bay Buccaneers winning the NFC Championship Game and making history as the first team to play a Super Bowl at home, the station re-branded as "93-3 B-U-C." The "B-U-C" branding continued on the day after the Buccaneers won the game.

During Hurricane Milton in 2024, WFLZ simulcasted the audio of WFLA-TV's live news coverage. The iHeart-specific coverage that aired statewide aired in Tampa on the other stations in the cluster.

== WFLZ-FM HD2 ==
WFLZ-FM's HD2 subchannel, which signed on in 2006, programmed a dance music format. At the start, it was launched as an extension of WFLZ's popular weekend mix show The House Party. In 2015 the subchannel switched to the "Evolution" EDM brand, but customized for Tampa-area listeners, billed as "Evolution 93.3 Tampa Bay." The subchannel also served as a reporter to Billboard's Dance/Mix Show Airplay Chart, in part due to having more of local content apart from the national "Evolution" network.

On June 26, 2019, WFLZ-FM-HD2 flipped to iHeart's "Pride Radio" format targeting the LGBTQ community, while Evolution moved to a newly created HD3 subchannel. "Evolution 93.3" has since been replaced with the national "Evolution" radio network as the flagship station.
