= Bob Lassiter =

American radio talk show host (1945–2006)

- Born: Robert Henry Glodowski; September 30, 1945; Camden, New Jersey
- Died: October 13, 2006 (aged 61); Tampa, Florida
- Other names: Mad Dog, "Blob"
- Presenting career
- Show: The Bob Lassiter Show
- Stations: WGBS 760 AM, Miami; WINZ 940 AM, Miami; WPLP 570 AM, Tampa; WFLA 970 AM, Tampa; WLS 890 AM, Chicago; WSUN 620 AM, Tampa
- Time slot: Monday-Friday
- Style: Talk show host
- Country: United States
- Website: www.bloglassiter.com

Bob Lassiter, also known as "Mad Dog", (September 30, 1945 – October 13, 2006) was a controversial and highly influential American radio talk show host in the 1980s and 1990s. He worked in several markets but is best known for his long stint in the Tampa Bay area.

== Career ==
=== Early career ===
Lassiter was born Robert Henry Glodowski in Camden, New Jersey and raised in Collingswood, New Jersey, where he lived until dropping out of high school in the middle of his junior year and running away to New York City. He then wandered the United States doing odd jobs until arriving in 1970 on St. Thomas in the U.S. Virgin Islands.

A sales representative from a beautiful music radio station heard Lassiter's voice in a bar in Charlotte Amalie in the Virgin Islands one afternoon and immediately suggested he apply for an on-air job. Lassiter was soon hired as a music disc jockey at the salesman's station, WESP-FM, signing on September 1, 1970, under the air name of "Ron Scott."

He would move from there to beautiful music and progressive rock stations all over the country: WOUR-FM in Utica, New York; WOWI-FM in Norfolk, Virginia; WEZS-FM in Richmond, Virginia; and WJOI-FM in Pittsburgh. After his first marriage in 1972, he legally changed his name to Lassiter.

In 1981, Lassiter was working as a country music DJ at WKQS-FM 99.9 in Miami under the name Bobby Clifford when he heard talk-radio giant Neil Rogers on WINZ (940 AM). Rogers became Lassiter's mentor and idol, whom he followed into talk radio by taking a late-night weekend slot at Miami's WGBS-AM (710) in 1984. (Lassiter apparently intended to continue as Bobby Clifford on WGBS, but in preparing for his debut the station prepared promos and announcements using the name "Lassiter" without asking; Lassiter was forced to use his real name on the air.) Rogers heard Lassiter on WGBS and liked what he did, urging his own station—in a relentless, on-air campaign—to hire the newcomer. WINZ did hire Lassiter as a weekend host, but fired him in December 1985 when he uttered a profanity on the air.

=== Tampa: WPLP (1985–87) and WFLA (1987–89) ===
In September 1985, Tampa Bay's first all-talk station, WPLP-AM, lured Lassiter to Tampa with his first (low-paid) full-time position on weeknights. (At the time he was still working weekends on WINZ and doing fill-ins at WPLP; the station intended to move Neil Rogers from nighttime to day and, until Lassiter was fired, was grooming him as Rogers' replacement.) He took over WPLP's afternoon drive time slot on September 23, 1985. Lassiter recalled on the air that the station initially offered him $12,000 per year, which he turned down, eventually accepting a comeback offer of $18,000 when Rogers suggested he take the job as training for doing talk radio every day. (He later admitted faking his resume to get hired at WPLP, claiming to be a graduate of the University of Pennsylvania.)

Although Lassiter's Miami career was not to be, he soon took Tampa by storm with his confrontational and deliberately offensive style, quickly rising to the top-rated talk program in the market by an enormous margin. He was, in fact, the second-highest-rated radio show in the market, bested only by Cleveland Wheeler and Scott Shannon's Q-ZOO on WRBQ-FM.

Lassiter redefined AM talk radio in Tampa Bay, asserting himself as an on-air bully who targeted Christians, conservatives, the elderly, and virtually everybody else. As he himself would one day describe:

A dozen years ago when I came to this town, talk radio was really quite amusing. ... It was basically old men talking to older men. ... Some exciting shows I heard in this market were things like, "If you know anybody famous, give me a call." And that was it. And the guy just repeated it over and over and over again, and got one call in an hour from somebody who knew one of the Harmonicats! ... Another show that I heard in this market was "What's your favorite vaudeville theater?" Another ... about once a month: "I own a Corvette. Do you own a Corvette? Give me a call if you do. What do you think about Corvettes? Would you like to own a Corvette? Did I mention that I owned one?" And he'd get two calls an hour. And I came in and sat down, and said "Ronald Reagan's a moron! And an idiot! You'll piss on his grave one of these days!" And the old people went berserk. Absolutely berserk!^{(1:22:34–1:24:00)}

Instead of a market for the retirees who formed much of the area's population, Lassiter made talk radio a young listener's medium: kids and young Baby Boomers would listen to hear Lassiter torment the old people. In the process, they would join in on the conversation and find themselves lambasted as well.

Lassiter's ratings and reputation were such that the biggest AM radio station in the market, WFLA, hired him away from WPLP for substantially more money in mid-1987. At FLA Lassiter joined the ranks of the golden age of Tampa talk radio, with such personalities as Dick Norman, Tedd Webb, and Liz Richards, and maintained his ratings supremacy to that local competition. Indeed, while Lassiter had pulled upwards of 7% shares at WPLP — which by itself made him the number one talk show in Tampa Bay — at WFLA he rose to 8 and 9 shares, at a time when the entire talk-radio audience in Tampa Bay was roughly a 10 share of the market.

=== Chicago (1989–91) ===
By 1989 Lassiter had become something of a sensation in the broadcast industry, appearing on national television and creating a demand for his talents in the largest markets in the U.S. WABC (AM) in New York made an offer in 1988, but WFLA would not let him out of his contract. (The slot at WABC eventually went to Rush Limbaugh instead.) Ultimately he was won over by WLS (AM), the Capital Cities/ABC radio hub in Chicago, who offered him a five-year, $1.05 million contract for the afternoon drive timeslot.

Lassiter's tenure at WLS was uneasy from the start: the CapCities executives behind the station micromanaged to an extreme degree, and were anxious to cultivate a friendly, inoffensive image, which ran completely counter to the type of radio that Lassiter did best. Members of management were waiting outside the studio on Lassiter's first night at WLS (23 August 1989) to give him a laundry list of things he had done that they did not want on their airwaves. Lassiter felt that since CapCities executives knew of his work before they even asked for a job interview, they knew perfectly well what kind of on-air personality they were getting. Lassiter deeply resented their sudden desire to rein him in.

Rather than change the style that had attracted WLS to him in the first place, Lassiter asked to be let out of the contract. The station refused, touching off what Lassiter called "open warfare" between WLS executives and their new employee. Their attempts to censor him only intensified his efforts to insult and infuriate his audience (and employers) on-air, and led Lassiter to walk out in the middle of staff meetings off-air. One journalist wrote that

he was at odds with management from the first day. "They'd scream everyday and I'd scream right back at them." Even worse, they put the Mad Dog on a short leash, but he kept breaking the chain. When told to curb his usual vulgarity and verbal abuse, he developed a code of secret insults which sounded like glowing compliments, and made the list available to listeners. When he was forbidden from saying he'd ever lived or worked anywhere other than Chicago, he'd coyly carry on in mock ignorance with the callers that remembered him from Florida.

"Tampa? Can't say as I've ever worked there."

"Oh, Sure you did, remember WFLA?"

"WFLA? I can't say as I've ever worked there."

It confused listeners who knew better, and drove management insane.

By late 1991, both parties were exasperated; unimpressive Arbitron ratings did not ease tensions. Lassiter's five-year contract had an escape clause that gave WLS the option to terminate it at the end of 1991, and Lassiter was openly predicting that the station would do exactly that. In fact, they didn't even wait for the end of the year, removing Lassiter from the air following his afternoon broadcast on September 20.

Although he would remember his time in Chicago as "a two-and-a-half-year nightmare", the job did raise Lassiter's profile significantly; in 1990, he appeared on CNN's Crossfire as a representative of left-wing political talk radio. In December 2005, Lassiter would later point out that - more than fourteen years after he was thrown off the air - he was still on the FAQ page on the WLS website. Indeed, as of August 2007, Question 7 on that page is "Why don't you bring back Bob Lassiter/Larry Lujack/etc.?" . "Maybe you don't know much about Lujack, but to be mentioned in the same sentence with him and WLS is more than an honor", Lassiter said. "It is and always will be the highlight of my career."

=== Return to Tampa ===
==== WSUN (1993–95) ====
Lassiter then moved to Davenport, Iowa with the intention of retiring from the radio business. After a year and a half, however, Tampa came calling again; the venerable WSUN was experimenting with a non-topical talk-radio format and offered him a hefty sum for its morning-drive slot. Lassiter accepted the job and moved back to Tampa, returning to the air on February 1, 1993.

The morning time slot saw Lassiter's combative persona reach a peak, as he began an increasingly hostile feud with his old mentor Neil Rogers. Neil would constantly deride him about his weight, calling him "Blob". Though it started out as a put down, the fans of Lassiter in Tampa area began to use it as a term of endearment. However, he was not a ratings success, and in January 1994 he moved to the mid-afternoon; Sharon Taylor, the newscaster for his morning show, became his on-air sidekick. While his numbers vastly improved, the circumstances forced him to change his approach drastically; in his final month (November 1995), Lassiter famously teased Taylor about her Thanksgiving turkey.

Despite his adaptations and his ratings (he regularly routed WFLA in his afternoon day part), Lassiter recognized that the station was failing and, as he had at WLS, began publicly predicting that his contract option would not be renewed. Again he was correct; WSUN's parent company Cox Broadcasting fired him before his scheduled showtime on November 27, 1995. Although Lassiter would later recall that no employer had ever treated him better or been more fun to work for, the end of his relationship with WSUN was very bitter: Cox refused to release him from his non-compete agreement (despite the fact that WSUN was changing formats and thus Lassiter would not be competition).

==== WFLA (1996–99) ====
Once the non-compete expired in April 1996, Lassiter returned to WFLA's night shift and reclaimed his classic persona, as well as his Arbitron ratings throne.

By that time, however, the business had changed dramatically. Rush Limbaugh had transformed the AM band; Lassiter referred to his style as "Support Group Radio" — he found that listeners had become used to having their beliefs echoed and reinforced by the radio host, not challenged—and not particularly primed to call the show. In addition, the Telecommunications Act of 1996 had deregulated station ownership, leading the industry to trend towards national syndication and away from local personalities.

The contrarian and often left-leaning Lassiter increasingly found himself an anachronism, even as he garnered tremendous market shares of listeners who both loved and loathed him. He rolled with the punches as best he could, provoking his audience more furiously than ever and taking on-air potshots at WFLA's own conservative host, Mark Larsen, but it often seemed that his real nemesis was the very industry he was part of, commercial radio.

In 1999 WFLA, which had been owned by Jacor, was purchased along with all of Jacor's holdings by Clear Channel (now iHeartMedia). At the time Clear Channel was building its radio empire and employing a variety of cost-cutting techniques, such as relying heavily on centralized, syndicated programming and eliminating local personalities and technicians from its payroll. Lassiter, disgusted by the changes Clear Channel was making and knowing that his time in radio was not long, began expressing open hostility to their policies on the air; at one point he was even reading employee questionnaires circulated inside the offices, and describing the deeply caustic answers he was filling in.

Finally on December 1, 1999, four weeks before his contract was set to expire, Lassiter opened his broadcast with a monologue aimed directly at WFLA's business office:

Management gets very, very, very distraught when I deal with internal things publicly. But for a month now, meetings get postponed, calls don't get returned; little things like that, you know? So we'll deal with it publicly.

My contract expires December 31, 1999 at 12 midnight. I inquired a month ago as to whether or not they had any interest in renewing it. As I said, phone calls don't get returned, lunch engagements get postponed, "Uh, give me another week on that, would ya?" Yesterday I had people saying goodbye to me. I had to read on a local bulletin board that yesterday was going to be my last day.

Well, I'm tired of making phone calls and not having them returned. I'm tired of all this kind of crap, so here's the bottom line: as far as I am concerned—and there will be no further discourse on this—as far as I am concerned, I will do my last show on December 23, because I have a week's vacation coming to me and I'll be damned if I'm gonna get screwed out of it.

So that settles the matter. You don't have to hide behind closed, locked doors anymore; you don't have to avoid me when I'm pulling into the parking lot; you don't have to look the other way when you're walking past the windows; you don't have to fail to return phone calls; you don't have to beg for another week; you don't have to bail out of luncheon meetings. That's it. And there will be no further discussion. This sucks! It sucks big time!

I'll bet you're mad at me for talking about this on the air, aren't you? "Why does he do that?" It's real simple. Treat me like I don't exist, and you don't exist. Thank you ever so much, WFLA. Thank you ever so much.

Predictably, he was told the next day that he need not bother to return to work at WFLA that day or any other. "Most men would have been devastated upon losing a six-figure, cushy job," Lassiter said later. "I was relieved." He officially retired from radio. His slot was filled by future radio star Glenn Beck.

== Retirement/Death ==
Shortly after his retirement, Lassiter experienced a serious downward slide in his health. A lifelong and unrepentant smoker, he had long ignored the advice of his physicians, and after he was diagnosed with diabetes in about 1990 he had ignored the problem until the disease had advanced considerably. Between 2000 and his death, he would lose 40 percent of his foot, receive treatment for bladder cancer, experience slow decline in kidney function, and slowly lose his eyesight.

During his retirement, Lassiter devoted himself to his longtime interest in futures trading, and in 2002 he started a public journal of his trades on Elite Trader, a popular web site for financial traders. He posted on ET under the username "Tampa" and his journal titled "Short Skirt Trades" would go on to become one of the most popular journals on the site. The journal retained Lassiter's wit, wordplay, and love of playing with his audience. Between 2004 and early 2005, Lassiter also maintained a trading blog (now deleted) under the alias of "The Big Cheese" (a nickname he'd been given as station manager in Utica).

By 2005, Lassiter was largely confined to his home in the Tampa Bay area. However, his spirits remained good, and in the summer of 2005 he began a new blog—under his own name—whose readership steadily increased. In his writings, Lassiter revisited many memories, but mostly depicted a life in which he was isolated and reclusive, his computer being his only real window on the outside world.

On February 14, 2006 — his 19th wedding anniversary—Lassiter revealed on his blog that he had been told that his kidneys were failing. His doctors, whom he had seen that day, had given him a prognosis of six months to two years. He lived eight months afterward, dying on October 13, 2006, 13 days after his 61st birthday. His death was revealed in a final post in his blog] by his wife, Mary Lassiter:

On Wednesday, October 11 he became too weak to get out of bed and remained in a sleep-like condition until he was gone at 9:15 am on Friday, October 13. He was not in pain . . . his life just stopped. His long struggle is finally at an end . . . much quicker than he or I anticipated. ...My thanks to those of you who have followed and shared his struggle over the past months, lending support and encouragement.

== Style ==
Although frequently funny and thought-provoking, Lassiter was always caustic, always contrarian, and often downright mean. He typically began his show with a topical monologue that could last anywhere from five minutes to an hour to a full three-hour shift; the monologue was usually designed to incite his listeners to the point of blind rage, at which point he would begin to accept calls from people who were furious to the point of inarticulacy. As he once put it, "It dawned on me that if I talked for an hour, hour and a half, by the time I stopped these people weren't rational. And then I would just rip them to shreds." In fact, Lassiter showed extreme disdain and impatience with his callers, not hesitating to poke fun at them, subtly trap them into demonstrating their hypocrisy or lies, or even to insult them outright. "Get off my phone, you subhuman pig!" became one of his most famous catchphrases.

Lassiter famously began each hour of his show by giving the day of the week, date, and time (e.g., "Six minutes after the hour of eight o'clock; welcome back, funseekers. It's a Thursday night, September the twelfth, nineteen hundred and ninety six.") He also cultivated a number of signature sign-offs over the years. At WPLP he ended each show by saying "Behave yourselves", and playing "Take It To the Limit" by The Eagles; at WLS, he signed off with, "Love you, Chicago"; in his final years at WFLA he closed by playing an extended version of The Blues Brothers' "Sweet Home Chicago" as he continued speaking or answering phones, then finally playing a tape of a caller saying "That's it?...We're done?...well, have a good night then."

=== Callers ===
Lassiter had no use for callers who agreed with him, often rushing them off the line so he could find someone with whom he could have a compelling fight. In fact, after his monologue and topic setup he would often tell people who agreed with him not to call, that he was only interested in opposing viewpoints that day; if he received callers who agreed with him anyway, he would immediately hang up on them.

Lassiter was willing to give equal time to those who disagreed with him, even if he would mercilessly lambast them afterward. Frequently, though, he had to force the opposition to speak their piece, cutting off their attempts at preambles, red herrings and ad hominem attacks and demanding that they answer the question at hand. If there was an exception to this rule, it was with the cranks and extremists: when he received calls from the religious fringe, conspiracy theorists, ideologues, even members of the Ku Klux Klan—he would let them have their say, even encouraging them to make outrageously offensive and marginal statements and thus discredit themselves.

In later years, Lassiter became known for "punishing" his listeners when they didn't call in. If he reached a point in the show at which the switchboard wasn't lit, rather than riffing or starting a new monologue to fill the time, Lassiter would allow dead air to sit in. He might hum "The Anniversary Waltz", drum his fingers on the console, or even be heard quietly dealing himself a game of solitaire. Sometimes he would adopt more creative punishments: one night in Chicago, when nobody would address his topic, Lassiter invited calls from Born-Again Christians who wanted to give their personal religious testimonies, and wouldn't allow any other callers. The message was, it was a call-in show, so it was callers' job to carry the program. Lassiter had no intention of doing their job for them. Occasionally, though, he would reward callers who annoyed him with absolute silence: in fact, on the night of August 2, 1996, Lassiter kept a caller on the air at WFLA without saying a word for 12 full minutes.

On the other hand, despite his unsparingly caustic demeanor and complete frankness, radio with Lassiter was in many respects a kind of free-for-all. At least once a week, Lassiter would do "open phones", letting people call in with whatever they wanted to talk about. At times, he would even bypass the call screeners and answer the phones himself—a format he called "Chat With Bob"—letting prank callers, and anyone who wanted to be on the radio at all, speak (although he would censor them if necessary). This would lead to an inordinant number of people calling in and flushing toilets or holding the receiver up to the radio to hear the show on the six second tape delay; Lassiter would frequently respond to these calls by mocking the lengthy period of time they would wait on hold (typically forty minutes to an hour) just to do something completely trivial.

=== Monologues ===
Although he was unpleasant and pointedly controversial, Lassiter was a careful and engaging orator, building his monologues and telephone harassment with masterful diction, phrasing, and dynamics. It was a strategy that worked: he himself often noted that the secret of his success was that even the many people who despised him couldn't help but listen night after night, year after year.

Lassiter was not shy about airing his personal life on the air: he shared extremely intimate details of his own childhood (including his parents' divorce and his subsequent estrangement from his father); his first marriage, including stories of an abortion and infidelities by both parties; his own history of recreational drug use; and the ups and downs of his radio career. "You probably know more about me than you do about your own spouse, unless you have a better-than-average marriage", he once informed his listeners. Listeners were also frequently treated to present-day anecdotes about himself and his second wife Mary (the former Mary Toensfeldt—nicknamed "Muffy" — who had been the business manager at WPLP during his tenure there), or his hobbies of astronomy, birdwatching, futures trading, and fiddling with his home computer. Often these were subjects he defaulted to when taking a break from "coliseum-style radio."

=== Stunts ===
Lassiter was also famous for the hoaxes and stunts he pulled on the radio. At times he told his audiences that he would dunk a kitten into a bucket of water live on the air until the board filled with calls, or that he was now forbidden by broadcast-decency advocates from having any even remotely controversial content on his shows. One Friday in the mid-1990s, he and the entire staff of WFLA convinced listeners that he had been pulled from the air by panicky management while substituting for another host, told them that there would be a major announcement about his future during his regular timeslot on Monday, and when listeners tuned in he was back on the air to rub their nose in their own gullibility.

==== The $50,000 Giveaway ====
The most famous and celebrated of his stunts became known as the "$50,000 Giveaway", which Lassiter pulled at WPLP on New Year's Day 1987. Explaining that there were to be changes in station policy in attempt to get big ratings, Lassiter announced that WPLP would be awarding $50,000 to each and every person who called that night and every other night in 1987; if they were listening before they called, Lassiter promised, callers would receive an additional $10,000. Additionally, the best caller of each hour would receive a brand-new Rolls-Royce, while the worst caller would receive an all-expenses-paid trip to Paris. Other prizes, such as vacation homes, yachts, and a penthouse in the Trump Tower, were offered occasionally throughout the show.

Every few minutes as Lassiter talked, his producer Michael Serio would cut in and whisper a disclaimer: "Pssst! Hey, he doesn't mean a word of it! So don't get any smart ideas about suing us!" Despite this, at least half of Lassiter's callers during his first three hours believed every word he told them and expressed absolute glee at having won $50,000 for doing nothing but calling a radio show. Even when Lassiter explained that to collect their money they merely needed to show up at the station in the morning (though he claimed not to know the address) and ask for it in cash, tax-free, with no need of identification, these "winners" never seemed to think that anything was fishy.

At the end of the third hour, Lassiter admitted openly to his callers that he had been lying all along, pointed out that his promises were absolutely outrageous and unbelievable, and took callers to task for taking him at his word without stopping to think about whether what they were hearing was even possible. Even after he did so, calls continued to pour in from people who wanted to win $50,000.

== Christmas Show ==
Every year on December 23 (or on the last Friday before Christmas), Lassiter's on-air vitriol seemed to vanish; on that day, he delivered his annual Christmas show, in which he fondly ruminated on the existence of Santa Claus and the meaning of the holiday, then spent the rest of his shift offering his own Christmas reminiscences from his childhood all the way to the present. He told the same stories every year, but always had different and compelling versions of them to keep the audience interested. Regular highlights included the year in which he gave the same Christmas list to each of his recently divorced parents, resulting in two of everything he asked for, and the story of a special present (a Lady Schick electric razor) he'd given his mother when he was twelve, only to discover, when cleaning out her home after her death 26 years later, that she had kept it for all that time. Lassiter's warmth and sentiment on these broadcasts was astonishing in contrast to his usual "Mad Dog" persona, and listeners often confessed to him that they found themselves captivated by the show, tears streaming down their faces as they relived Lassiter's Christmases with him.

== On-Air Blunder ==
On January 26, 1989, he was asked to fill in for the first 30 minutes of the following WFLA shift, that of station mainstay Dick Norman. Lassiter straight-facedly informed Norman's listeners that he had just renegotiated his contract and that because his ratings were so high, he was able to demand that WFLA fire Norman.

Ironically, the regular news reports during Lassiter's show featured the story of a car that had backed full speed into a large propane tank at a gas station in nearby Brandon, Florida, killing the heretofore unknown driver in a fiery crash. The irony was that the driver was Dick Norman. When he was informed of Norman's death several minutes into the show, Lassiter immediately issued a very emotional, repentant, on-air apology and filled in for the rest of Norman's timeslot, inviting listeners to call in and share their reminiscences of "Uncle Dickie."

== Airchecks ==
Lassiter's unique and provocative style have created a high demand for airchecks of his old shows. One of the most notorious of these, known as "Mr. Airstream," is a recording from WPLP on April 1, 1987. It is a phone conversation in which an irate elderly man in an Airstream trailer protests Lassiter's treatment of old people, as well as the President (who, at the time, was Ronald Reagan) and Jim and Tammy Faye Bakker; threatens to report him to the station management, the FCC, the Chamber of Commerce, and even the police; and ends the call by saying, "Have a bad night, hippie!" Fans of the recording, as well as Lassiter himself, consider it to be the greatest moment in talk-radio history.
