= WXTB =

Active rock radio station in Clearwater, Florida, United States

- Clearwater, Florida; United States
- Broadcast area: Tampa Bay Area
- Frequency: 97.9 MHz (HD Radio)
- Branding: 98ROCK

Programming
- Format: Active rock
- Subchannels: HD2: Talk radio (WFLA)
- Affiliations: Compass Media Networks; iHeartRadio; Premiere Networks; Tampa Bay Buccaneers

Ownership
- Owner: iHeartMedia; (iHM Licenses, LLC)
- Sister stations: WDAE; WDAE-FM; WFLA; WFLZ-FM; WFUS; WHNZ; WMTX

History
- First air date: December 1967
- Former call signs: WQXM (1967–1983); WZNE (1983–1986); WKRL (1986–1990)
- Call sign meaning: "X Tampa Bay"

Technical information
- Licensing authority: FCC
- Facility ID: 11274
- Class: C
- ERP: 100,000 watts
- HAAT: 458 meters (1,503 ft)
- Transmitter coordinates: 28°10′57″N 82°46′5.4″W
- Translators: HD2: 94.5 W233AV (Gulfport); HD2: 99.1 W256CT (Bayonet Point)

Links
- Public license information: Public file; LMS
- Webcast: Listen live (via iHeartRadio)
- Website: 98rock.iheart.com

WXTB (97.9 FM, "98 Rock") is a commercial active rock radio station owned by iHeartMedia and licensed to Clearwater, Florida, serving the Tampa Bay Area. The WXTB studios are located in South Tampa, while the station transmitter resides in Holiday. In addition to a standard analog transmission, WXTB broadcasts over two HD Radio channels, and is available online via iHeartRadio.

In addition to covering the Tampa Bay market as a whole, the station also covers areas of Levy County and Marion County, which are part of the Gainesville-Ocala radio market. WXTB also has a rimshot signal to the Orlando market, and is able to be heard in western suburbs of the city.

== History ==
The station signed on the air in December 1967 as WQXM with a beautiful music format with owners John T. Rutledge and Joseph S. Field, with Jerry Reeves as music director and station manager until the sale of the station to Plough Broadcasting in 1975, switching to an AOR format under the name 98 Rock, Your Album Station in 1977. In July 1983, the station changed its call letters to WZNE and rebranded it as Z98, Tampa Bay's Hottest Hits! The station briefly first adopted a hybrid AOR/Top 40 A.K.A. Rock 40 format at first before the station made a format transition to a Top 40/CHR by the following year. After changing its format towards mainstream, the station tried to compete against Tampa Bay's dominant CHR leader WRBQ-FM, but it was a short battle. This only lasted until January 6, 1986, when the station flipped to a classic rock format as Classic Rock 97.9 WKRL leaving WRBQ the only CHR station in the Tampa market throughout the remainder of the 1980s.

WKRL lasted until December 30, 1989, when the signal went silent briefly, and then Led Zeppelin's "Stairway to Heaven" began playing in constant rotation, eventually lasting for 24 hours, as an early form of stunting. Finally, the repetition gave way to the announcement on December 31, 1989, that WKRL, now controlled by Great American Broadcasting, would be the first all-Led Zeppelin format station in the country, playing the band's entire catalog in its entirety as well as solo efforts by the bandmates and their other music-related projects. WKRL received national coverage from MTV to CBS and many other outlets, and was the first station to get worldwide coverage for a true "artist flip", where a broadcaster based its entire business on one group or solo artist.

Two weeks unfolded with conjecture from various news outlets as to how long this format could last, given that all studio Zeppelin recordings available at the time added up to less than 10 hours of continuous play. The station responded over the following week by adding a few classic acts such as Pink Floyd, ZZ Top, The Rolling Stones, and Van Halen. With the bells of AC/DC's "Hells Bells" playing in the background, a major announcement came at noon on January 18, 1990, that the station would be changing its call letters to WXTB, and the station would be relaunched as The New 98 Rocks The Bay! or simply just known as The New 98 Rock.

New program director Gregory Mull, brought in from 96 K-Rock in Fort Myers to replace the outgoing Beau Raines, immediately reorganized the on-air personality list. Brian Smith and Bruce Barber, morning DJs who trailed in the ratings, both were released and replaced by morning newcomer Tommy "Seabass" Sebastian, who stunted his first few weeks as "Buck Maui" and is also the voice of the popular character "The Big Chief Meteorologist". Teddy "Ted Kamikaze" Cannarozzi was assigned to do the 10 a.m. to 2 p.m. slot. Scott "The Ledge" Ledger and Austin Keyes kept their afternoon and evening spots, respectively. Marla "Stone" Stonecipher, Kelli "K.C." Casey, Ronnie "Big Rig" Michaels, Heather McCoy, and Peter McLaren rounded out the schedule, and to complete the station Gregory hired Joe Kelly to become the official voice of WXTB.

In late 1990, 98 Rock launched what would turn into a 15-year tradition-the "Livestock" annual rock festival. A fusion of "Live Aid" and "Woodstock", Livestock was the brainchild of Mull and Sebastian. Each weekend-long Livestock event brought well-known national acts such as Soundgarden and Tesla together with lesser-known bands hoping for a chance at success. In keeping with the charitable spirit of Live Aid and other rock benefits, bands donated their performance time and a portion of the gate proceeds were donated to charities such as Greenpeace.

As the station rose in the ratings books, WXTB took over local promotional opportunities at The Rock-It Club and Killian's Rock Cafe in Ybor City. Meanwhile, WXTB gained a huge piece of the morning show market with the Seabass and Marla morning show. The new 98 Rock became a ratings success.

In 2000, the station moved its studios from Feather Sound Corporate Center to new owner iHeartMedia (then known as Clear Channel Communications)'s broadcast complex in southwest Tampa in an attempt to consolidate overall operations of Clear Channel stations in the area.

On January 18, 2010, at noon, WXTB replayed its format launch from 20 years earlier, including the final countdown in which soundbites from phone calls, many of which trashed then-rival WYNF, were played. The first four songs played after the launch ("Hells Bells" by AC/DC, "Kickstart My Heart" by Mötley Crüe, "Paradise City" by Guns N' Roses, and "Hot for Teacher" by Van Halen) were played again in tribute to the current format's 20th anniversary, along with original bumpers.

In April 2017, WXTB was named the new flagship station of the Tampa Bay Buccaneers Radio Network, taking over for sister station WFUS. For the first time in Buccaneers history, game days featured seven-and-a-half-hours of team programming completely on the FM dial, including pre- and post-game shows bookending the action on the field.

Starting with the 2022-23 season, due to NFL+, 98 Rock’s coverage will be blacked out except within the station’s coverage area. Pre and postgame coverage will continue to be available nationwide. A message regarding the blackout featuring various 98 Rock personalities will play for those streaming outside the coverage area.

== Notable on-air staff ==
WXTB-FM was the home of the top rated "98 Rock All Request Morning Show" with Seabass and Heather (1990–1993), and then later Seabass and Marla (1993–1995). The station brought in former rival WYNF Program Director Charlie Logan to replace Seabass, with "The Charlie and Marla Morning Show" lasting less than one year. In December 1996, WXTB became the official flagship of the former regional radio host Todd Clem, better known as Bubba the Love Sponge. Bubba arrived for mornings at a time when the station was struggling to find a morning personality to replace the popular Seabass. Bubba had handled nights for Top 40/CHR station WFLZ ("Power 93: The Power Pig"). A huge backlash followed for months where Bubba's urban-influenced broadcast style conflicted with the 'radical surfer' Seabass and the hard rock listener mentality. Following a record-setting fine assessed by the Federal Communications Commission in February 2004 over alleged indecent content, he was fired and syndication of his morning show to affiliated stations (mainly throughout the Southeast) ceased.

Bubba would be replaced by Lex & Terry, who covered it until December 2009. Ron “Big Rig” Michaels is the last remaining original staff member still with the station 1p.m.-7p.m. daily, and is syndicated on over 100 iHeartMedia stations daily.

== Concerts ==
=== Livestock ===
Livestock was a series of concerts held at Festival Park in Zephyrhills Florida from 1990 to 2005.

==== Livestock ====
The first Livestock took place from September 29–30, 1990 with the following bands performing:

Day 1
Uncle Sally
Deloris Telescope
Bobby Friss
Stranger
Cry Wolf
Kings X
Trixter
Savatage
Every Mothers Nightmare
Day 2
Rocky Ruckman & the Beat Heathen's
Saber
Bleeding Hearts
Spread Eagle
Blackfoot

==== Livestock 2 ====
Livestock 2 took place from November 15–17, 1991 with the following bands performing:

Day 1
Colorblind
Tyger Tyger
Deloris Telescope
The Scream & Dangerous Toys
Day 2
Factory Black
Men From Earth
Bobby Friss
St. Warren
McQueen Street
Tall Stories
Heartless
Savatage
Galactic Cowboys
Four Horsemen
Soundgarden
Saigon Kick
Day 3
Uncle Sally
Bleeding Hearts
Asphalt Ballet
Stranger
White Trash

==== Livestock 3 ====
U.R.O.K.
Secret Service
Steinhardt-Moon
Life, Sex & Death
Copperhead
Stranger
Young Turk
Heartless
Jackyl
Lynch Mob
Lynryd Skynyrd
Love Junkies
Deeforce
Spread Eagle
Trouble
Every Mother's Nightmare

==== Livestock 4 ====
Hear Comes Rusty
Eric Gales
Saigon Kick
Anthrax
Steppenwolf
The Screamin' Cheetah Wheelies
Cry of Love
Candlebox

==== Livestock 5 ====
Toadies
Green Apple Quickstep
Lillian Axe
Live
Sponge
Tesla
Hootie & the Blowfish
Great White
Dokken
Bush
Animal Bag
I Mother Earth

==== Livestock 6 ====
Joe Satriani
Dishwalla
Self
Into Another
Drivin' N' Cryin
Sugarspoon
Korn
I Mother Earth
Tripping Daisy
The Hazies
Life of Agony
Men From Earth
Hello Joseph
Seven Mary Three
The Screamin' Cheetah Wheelies
Killer Kona Buds
Bloom
Joe Popp
Stabbing Westward
Filter

==== Livestock 7 ====
Jackyl & Brian Johnson
Bloodhound Gang
Seven Mary Three
Screamin' Cheetah Wheelies
Matchbox Twenty
Tonic
Type O Negative
Mötley Crüe
Gravity Kills
Helmet
Stir
Darlahood
Local H
Mighty Joe Plum
Handsome & Drain S.T.H.

==== Livestock 8 ====
Fat
Cool For August
Third Eye Blind
Limp Bizkit
Days of the New
Neurotica
Sevendust
Creed
Jimmie's Chicken Shack
Life of Agony
Brother Cane
Impotent Sea Snakes
The Hazies
Mighty Joe Plum
Kenny Wayne Shepherd
Megadeth

==== Livestock 9 ====
Neurotica
2nd Coming
Honky Toast
Virgos Merlot
Oleander
Screamin Cheetah Wheelies
Loudmouth
Buckcherry
Godsmack
Slash's Snakepit
Stabbing Westward
Sammy Hagar
Staind
Econoline Crush
Sponge
Kid Rock
Silverchair

==== Livestock 10 ====
Guano Apes
Nickelback
3 Doors Down
Lit
Static X
Sevendust
8 Stops 7
Kittie
Chevelle
P.O.D.
Foo Fighters
Staind
Creed

==== Livestock 11 ====
Crossbreed
Darwin's Waiting Room
Hed PE
Tantric
Black Crows
Tesla
Staind
Linkin Park
The Offspring
3 Doors Down
Disturbed
Cold
Oleander
Nonpoint
Skrape
Systematic
Mudvayne

==== Livestock 12 ====
Stone Temple Pilots
Jerry Cantrell
Kid Rock
Rob Zombie
Puddle of Mudd
Sevendust
Adema
Soil
Ear Shot
Gravity Kills
Local H
Fu Manchu
Reveille
Course of Nature
Chevelle
Lost Prophets
The Apex Theory
Sinastar
Custom
Kevin Martin
Battery
Ned Zeppelin

==== Livestock 13 ====
Livestock 13 took place from April 26–27, 2003 with the following bands performing:

Godsmack
Def Leppard
3 Doors Down
Stone Sour
Seether
Theory of a Deadman
Powerman 5000
Oleander
Socialburn
Trapt
Shinedown
Presence
The Little Kings
Battery
Hell's Belles
RA
Pacifier
Four Star Riot
Crossbreed
Soulfound
Saliva

==== Livestock 14 ====
Livestock 14 took place from April 23–24, 2004 with the following bands performing:

Second Drop
Hatebreed
Finger 11
3 Days Grace
Shinedown
Trapt
Tantric
Smile Empty Soul
Soil
Sevendust
Drowning Pool
Damageplan
The Offspring
Puddle of Mudd

==== Livestock 15 ====
The final Livestock took place from April 28–29, 2005 with the following bands performing:

Band	Stage	Time
	Day 1	
Halestorm	East	6:00 p.m. - 6:20 p.m.
Mercy Fall	West	6:25 p.m. - 6:45 p.m.
Egypt Central	East	6:55 p.m. - 7:15 p.m.
Hybrid	West	7:20 p.m. - 7:40 p.m.
Black Stone Cherry	East	7:50 p.m. - 8:20 p.m.
Revelation Theory	West	8:30 p.m. - 9:00 p.m.
Tantric	East	9:10 p.m. - 9:50 p.m.
Saliva	West	10:00 p.m. - 11:15 p.m.
	Day 2	
Clenchfist	East	12:00 p.m. - 12:20 p.m.
Faktion	West	12:30 p.m. - 12:50 p.m.
Hybrid	East	1:00 p.m. - 1:20 p.m.
Hurt	West	1:30 p.m. - 2:00 p.m.
Evans Blue	East	2:10 p.m. - 2:40 p.m.
Hinder	West	2:50 p.m. - 3:30 p.m.
Theory of a Deadman	East	3:40 p.m. - 4:20 p.m.
Trapt	West	4:35 p.m. - 5:35 p.m.
Shinedown	East	5:50 p.m. - 7:05 p.m.
Staind	West	7:20 p.m. - 8:35 p.m.
Rob Zombie	East	8:50 p.m. - 10:05 p.m.
Mudvayne	West	10:20 p.m. - 11:35 p.m.

=== 98RockFest new annual concert series ===
98RockFest is a yearly rock festival held currently in Tampa, Florida by the radio station.

=== World's Largest Barbecue ===
The World's Largest Barbecue was a free concert series held at the Wagon Wheel Flea Market in Pinellas Park Florida. The last concert in this series was no longer free and held inside.

Some of the bands that played are Candlebox, Creed, Faith No More, Goldfinger, I Mother Earth, Naked, and Sugarspoon.

=== Guavaween ===
Guavaween is an annual Latin-flavored Halloween celebration which takes place on the last Saturday of October in the historic neighborhood of Ybor City on Tampa, Florida. It is named after Tampa's nickname, "The Big Guava".

==== Guavaween 1994 ====
Guavaween 1994 took place on October 29, 1994 with the following bands performing on 98 Rock's stage.

Band	Time
Foghat
Joan Jett and the Blackhearts
Toadies

==== Guavaween 1996 ====
Guavaween 1996 took place on October 26, 1996. The power was pulled for an hour during The Killer Kona Buds set. Possibly due to a conflict between Ybor and the choice of bands. 98 Rock had a parody of Pepper by Butthole Surfers, replacing the lyrics with lyrics making fun of the situation, where Peter Steel from Type 'O Negative was Satan and such.

The following bands performed on 98 Rock's stage:

Band	Time
Primitive Radio Gods
The Killer Kona Buds
Type O Negative
Butthole Surfers

==== Guavaween 1997 ====
Guavaween 1997 took place on October 25, 1997 with the following bands performing on 98 Rock's stage:

Band	Time
Veruca Salt
Smackhead
Creed

==== Guavaween 1998 ====
Guavaween 1998 took place on October 31, 1998 with the following bands performing on 98 Rock's stage:

Band	Time
Crossbreed	4:00 p.m. - 4:25 p.m.
Smackhead	4:40 p.m. - 5:05 p.m.
Neurotica	5:25 p.m. - 6:00 p.m.
Second Coming	6:20 p.m. - 6:55 p.m.
Econoline Crush	7:25 p.m. - 8:05 p.m.
Fuel	8:35 p.m. - 9:25 p.m.
Candlebox	9:50 p.m. - 11:00 p.m.

==== Guavaween 1999 ====
Guavaween 1999 took place on October 30, 1999 with the following bands performing on 98 Rock's stage:

Band	Time
Silver	5:00 p.m. - 5:40 p.m.
Neurotica	6:10 p.m. - 7:10 p.m.
Dope	7:30 p.m. - 8:20 p.m.
311	8:45 p.m. - 9:55 p.m.
Days of the New	10:20 p.m. - 11:30 p.m.

==== Guavaween 2000 ====
Guavaween 2000 took place on October 28, 2000 with the following bands performing on 98 Rock's stage:

Band	Time
Chromatic	4:00 p.m. - 4:30 p.m.
Crossbreed	4:50 p.m. - 5:20 p.m.
Neurotica	5:40 p.m. - 6:10 p.m.
Full Devil Jacket	6:30 p.m. - 7:10 p.m.
Cold	7:35 p.m. - 8:15 p.m.
Fuel	8:40 p.m. - 9:35 p.m.
Godsmack	10:05 p.m.

==== Guavaween 2001 ====
Guavaween 2001 took place on October 27, 2001 with the following bands performing on 98 Rock's stage:

Band	Time
Systematic	4:00 p.m.
Stereomud	5:20 p.m.
Adema	7:30 p.m.
Drowning Pool	8:30 p.m.
Disturbed	9:45 p.m.

==== Guavaween 2002 ====
Guavaween 2002 took place on October 26, 2002 with the following bands performing on 98 Rock's stage:

Band	Time
Theory of a Deadman	6:00 p.m.
Seether	6:30 p.m.
Chevelle	7:00 p.m.
Sevendust	7:30 p.m.

==== Guavaween 2003 ====
Guavaween 2003 took place in October 2003 with the following bands performing on 98 Rock's stage:

Band	Time
Skrape	5:30 p.m.
Soil	6:20 p.m.
Cinder	7:15 p.m.
Switchfoot	8:15 p.m.
Shinedown	9:10 p.m.
Static X	10:20 p.m.

==== Guavaween 2004 ====
Guavaween 2004 took place on October 30, 2004 with the following bands performing on 98 Rock's stage:

Band	Time
Saliva	11:00 p.m.
Collective Soul	9:15 p.m.
Future Leaders of the World	8:00 p.m.
Adrift	7:00 p.m.
10 Second Drop	6:00 p.m.
R50	5:00 p.m.

==== Guavaween 2005 ====
Guavaween 2005 took place on October 29, 2005 with the following bands performing on 98 Rock's stage:

Band	Time
10 Second Drop
Social Burn
Revelation Theory
10 Years
Smile Empty Soul
Breaking Benjamin
Saliva

==== Guavaween 2006 ====
Guavaween 2006 took place on October 15, 2006 with the following bands performing on 98 Rock's stage:

Band	Time
Seether
Scratch & Sniff
Evans Blue
Flyleaf
Burn Season
Clenchfist

==== Guavaween 2007 ====
Guavaween 2007 took place on October 27, 2007 with the following bands performing on 98 Rock's stage:

Band	Time
Hellyeah
Nonpoint
Skindred
Core
Ankla
Karnivool
Transera
Clenchfist

==== Guavaween 2008 ====
Guavaween 2008 took place on October 25, 2008 with the following bands performing on 98 Rock's stage:

Band	Time
Puddle of Mudd
Theory of a Deadman
Black Stone Cherry
Parlor Mob
Basic Rock Outfit

==== Guavaween 2009 ====
Guavaween 2009 took place in October 2009 with the following bands performing on 98 Rock's stage:

Band	Time
SoulSwitch	5:00 p.m.
Psykill	6:30 p.m.
Future Leaders of the World	8:00 p.m.
Soulidium	9:30 p.m.
Vicious Angelz	Example
Nonpoint	Example
Sevendust	12:30 a.m.

==== Guavaween 2010 ====
Guavaween 2010 took place in October 2010. The following bands performed on the 98 Rock stage which was located on the northeast corner of 7th Avenue & 14th Street:

Band	Time
Through You	5:00 p.m. - 6:00 p.m.
We Are The Fallen	6:20 p.m. - 7:20 p.m.
Hail The Villain	7:40 p.m. - 8:40 p.m.
Fuel	9:00 p.m. - 10:00 p.m.
Saving Abel	10:30 p.m. - 11:30 p.m.
Genitorturers	12:00 a.m. - 1:00 a.m.
