= WWMI =

Relevant Radio station in Tampa

- St. Petersburg, Florida; United States
- Broadcast area: Tampa Bay area
- Frequency: 1380 kHz

Programming
- Language: English
- Format: Catholic radio
- Network: Relevant Radio

Ownership
- Owner: Relevant Radio, Inc.

History
- First air date: November 30, 1939
- Former call signs: WBOX (CP only, 1939); WTSP (1939–1959); WLCY (1959–1981); WNSI (1981–1982); WRBQ (1982–1999)
- Former frequencies: 1370 kHz (1939–1941)
- Call sign meaning: "We Want Mickey"; (Radio Disney era)

Technical information
- Licensing authority: FCC
- Facility ID: 11954
- Class: B
- Power: 9,800 watts (day); 6,500 watts (night)
- Transmitter coordinates: 27°52′16.1″N 82°37′2.4″W
- Translator: 99.9 W260DM (St. Petersburg)

Links
- Public license information: Public file; LMS
- Webcast: Listen live
- Website: www.relevantradio.com

WWMI (1380 kHz) is an AM radio station licensed to St. Petersburg, Florida, and serving the Tampa Bay radio market. It is owned by Relevant Radio, a non-profit Catholic broadcasting organization based in Wisconsin. WWMI carries its Relevant Radio network programming.

By day, WWMI is powered at 9,800 watts non-directional. To protect other stations on 1380 AM from interference, at night it reduces power to 6,500 watts and switches to a directional antenna with a three-tower array. The transmitter is co-located with the tower for WTSP television, off Gandy Boulevard in St. Petersburg.

== History ==
On April 3, 1939, the Federal Communications Commission (FCC) awarded a construction permit to the Pinellas Broadcasting Company. It was allowed to build a new radio station on 1370 kHz in St. Petersburg, Florida, broadcasting with 250 watts during the day and 100 at night. Its initial call sign was WBOX; before launch, it changed to WTSP ("Welcome to St. Petersburg"). The station signed on the air on the morning of November 30. In the same year it was founded, Pinellas Broadcasting was sold to Paul and Nelson Poynter, who owned the St. Petersburg Times.

On March 29, 1941, the North American Regional Broadcasting Agreement (NARBA) was enacted. That required WTSP to move to 1380 kHz. Later that year, the station was approved for an increase to 1,000 watts day and 500 watts night. It became the first Tampa Bay network affiliate of the Mutual Broadcasting System. In late 1946, construction began on a new 5,000-watt facility near the southern approach to the Gandy Bridge, which would also house an FM station. By 1954, WTSP-FM 102.5, established in 1948, had been upgraded to broadcast with 77,000 watts. That same year, however, the station lost in its fight to win a television station on channel 8; rival newspaper The Tampa Tribune and its WFLA were given the nod to build WFLA-TV.

In 1956, Ferris, Joe and Sam Rahall—natives of Beckley, West Virginia, but whose parents were longtime winter residents of St. Petersburg—purchased WTSP AM and FM from the Times for $200,000. The Rahalls opted to dismantle the FM operation, surrendering the license in December. Seeking to update the station "in the modern trend", WTSP became WLCY on July 15, 1959. The new name gave rise to the station's new moniker, "Radio Elsie".

For many years, WLCY was the Tampa Bay area's premier rock and roll station, with offices, studios, and transmitter in the previous WTSP facility on Gandy Boulevard near 4th Street North. The station later shared space with Rahall's WLCY-TV and the new WLCY-FM at the "Rahall Color Communications Center", just east of the original Gandy site. The name of the licensee changed to WLCY, Inc., on June 20, 1963, and then to the Rahall Communications Corporation on October 3, 1969. WLCY began to identify dual city of license as "St. Petersburg-Tampa" in 1976.

Rahall began to divest itself of its Tampa Bay properties, and in September 1978, Florida Radio, Inc. became the station's new owner. WLCY moved out of the TV building and back into the old WTSP studios.

The AM station was eventually sold to Harte-Hanks and was changed to WNSI (News, Sports and Information). After Edens Broadcasting bought the station, it became WRBQ, and flipped to a simulcast of WRBQ-FM. The simulcast, however, was limited due to FCC rules. As such, WRBQ AM had a distinct rhythmic and R&B playlist during certain hours of the day circa December 1982. This would eventually end, with a full simulcast that would last until January 24, 1992, when WRBQ flipped to the satellite-fed urban adult contemporary format known as "The Touch" and picked up Tom Joyner to host mornings. In July of that year, Edens sold WRBQ-AM-FM to Clear Channel Communications.

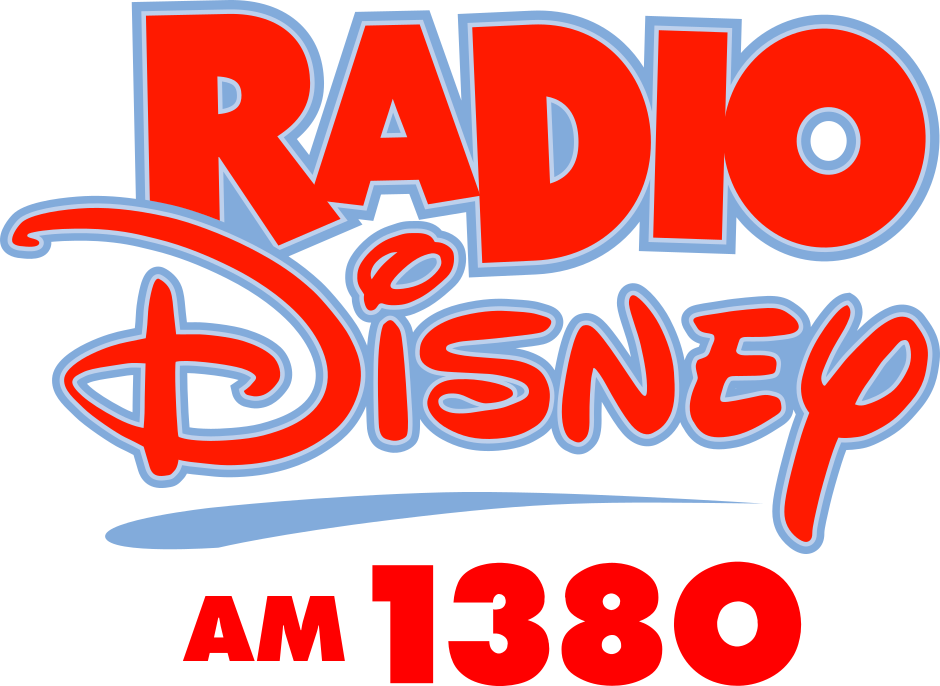
WWMI logo used from 2002 until 2007.

In February 1999, ABC Radio bought the station; on May 3, it became WWMI and began carrying ABC's children's/contemporary hit radio network, Radio Disney. WWMI was also the de facto affiliate for the Walt Disney World area until WDYZ in Orlando flipped in 2001. On August 13, 2014, The Walt Disney Company put WWMI and 22 other Radio Disney stations up for sale, to focus on digital distribution of the Radio Disney network.

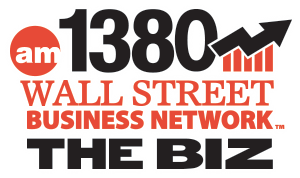
Logo as "The Biz"

On September 15, 2015, it was announced that Salem Media Group acquired the last five Radio Disney owned-and-operated stations for sale (including WWMI) for $2.225 million. WWMI was acquired through South Texas Broadcasting, Inc., for $750.000. The sale of WWMI was completed on December 11. On December 14, the station became Salem's Wall Street Business Network affiliate in Tampa Bay. WWMI was now one of two stations in the market airing a business news/talk format, the other being WHFS.

On July 25, 2019, Salem Media Group agreed to sell WWMI and WLCC, as well as WKAT and WZAB in the Miami market, to Immaculate Heart Media, Inc. for more than $8.2 million. On May 17, 2021, WWMI switched to the English-language version of Relevant Radio.
