= WFLA (AM) =

Radio station in Tampa, Florida

- Tampa, Florida; United States
- Broadcast area: Tampa-St. Petersburg-Clearwater and Sarasota-Bradenton, Florida
- Frequency: 970 kHz
- Branding: Newsradio WFLA

Programming
- Format: Conservative talk radio
- Affiliations: Fox News Radio; NBC News Radio; Compass Media Networks; Premiere Networks

Ownership
- Owner: iHeartMedia, Inc.; (iHM Licenses, LLC)
- Sister stations: WDAE; WDAE-FM; WFLZ-FM; WFUS; WHNZ; WMTX; WXTB

History
- First air date: October 4, 1925
- Former call signs: WGHB (1925–1927); WFHH (1927); WFLA (1927); WFLA-WSUN (1927–1937)
- Former frequencies: 1130 kHz (1925–1927); 590 kHz (1927–1929); 620 kHz (1929–1941); 940 kHz (1941)
- Call sign meaning: Florida

Technical information
- Licensing authority: FCC
- Facility ID: 29729
- Class: B
- Power: 25,000 watts (day); 11,000 watts (night)
- Transmitter coordinates: 28°1′15.1″N 82°36′33.3″W
- Translator: See § Translators
- Repeaters: 97.9 WXTB-HD2 (Clearwater); 25.87 MHz (Shortwave)

Links
- Public license information: Public file; LMS
- Webcast: Listen live (via iHeartRadio)
- Website: wflanews.iheart.com

WFLA (970 AM) is a commercial radio station licensed to Tampa, Florida, United States, and serving the Tampa Bay media market. Owned by iHeartMedia, the station airs a talk format, with studios on Gandy Boulevard in South Tampa. WFLA's transmitter site is off Montague Street in Town 'n' Country, Florida. Programming is also heard on two FM translators, 94.5 MHz in Gulfport and 99.1 in Bayonet Point.

== History ==
In 1925, the station first signed on as WGHB in Clearwater. In 1927, its call sign changed to WFHH, and later that year to WFLA at 1130 kHz.

=== WSUN jointly licensed with WFLA as WFLA-WSUN ===
WSUN was first authorized in October 1927, joining WFLA at 590 kHz, with this station now assigned a dual call sign of WFLA-WSUN, under shared ownership by the Clearwater and St. Petersburg Chambers of Commerce. WSUN made its debut broadcast on November 1, using the slogan "Why Stay Up North".

In 1927 WFLA-WSUN moved to 580 kHz, then to 900 kHz the next year. In 1929, radio frequencies for stations in Florida were reallocated, and WFLA-WSUN moved to 620 kHz.

The station's transmitter site was originally on the north side of the Courtney Campbell Causeway near Clearwater.

=== First directional antenna in the United States ===
WFLA-WSUN's move to 620 kHz resulted in a nighttime interference complaint from another station on that frequency, WTMJ in Milwaukee, Wisconsin. WFLA-WSUN was ordered to reduce powers from 1,000 watts night and 2,500 watts day to 250 watts night and 500 watts day.

Station manager Walter Tison began an investigation into whether there was a way that WFLA-WSUN could increase its nighttime power to more acceptable level. Working with T. A. M. Craven, a British engineer, Raymond M. Wilmotte, was engaged in 1932 to construct a then-theoretical antenna system that would reduce the signal sent toward Milwaukee. The idea that a directional antenna would resolve the issue was somewhat controversial, with some doubters stating that fluctuations in the ionosphere would cause issues, while others believed that instead of going directly to Milwaukee, the WFLA-WSUN signal was actually traveling west through the Gulf of Mexico, then turning north through the Mississippi valley.

The directional antenna installation, the first in the United States, consisting of two 200-foot (61 m) towers, was successful. As an example of its effectiveness, engineer Wilmotte noted that at one point a telegram was sent from regulators in Washington asking why WFLA-WSUN was off the air, because an inspector located in Atlanta was not receiving the station when it employed the directional antenna.

=== WFLA and WSUN switch to separate licenses ===
WFLA and WSUN were affiliates of the NBC Red Network, carrying dramas, comedies, news, sports, soap operas, game shows and big band broadcasts during the "Golden Age of Radio".

In 1937, the joint ownership of WFLA-WSUN was severed, with the two stations continuing to operate on 620 kHz using a common transmitter, but separately licensed on a time-sharing basis. WFLA was allocated full-time use of Mondays, Wednesdays, and Fridays, and shared hours on Sundays.

=== WFLA becomes full-time station after frequency change ===
In 1940, The Tribune Company was given permission to construct a full-time station on 940 kHz. Because this was technically a new station, this authorization was initially given the call sign of WKGA. However, the authorization included shutting down WFLA on 620 kHz, so when operations began on 940 kHz, the historic WFLA call sign was transferred to the new frequency. WFLA's owner also owned The Tampa Tribune. The studios and offices were in the Seminole Building. WSUN stayed on 620 kHz, licensed to St. Petersburg (now WDAE).

From 1945 to 1949, WFLA carried a southern gospel show, which featured legendary bass singer J. D. Sumner and The Sunny South Quartet. WFLA and WSUN were owned by the Clearwater and St. Petersburg Chambers of Congress.

=== FM and TV ===
WFLA added an FM station in 1948, WFLA-FM (now WFLZ). In its early years, WFLA-FM largely simulcast its AM sister station. An advertisement in the 1950 edition of Broadcasting Yearbook said that WFLA-AM-FM were the "most listened to" stations in "the heart of Florida's most heavily populated trade area". In the mid-to-late 1960s, WFLA-FM switched from Top 40 to beautiful music. A television station also went on the air in 1955, WFLA-TV, which is now owned by the Nexstar Media Group. Because WFLA radio carried NBC programming, WFLA-TV also joined the NBC Television Network.

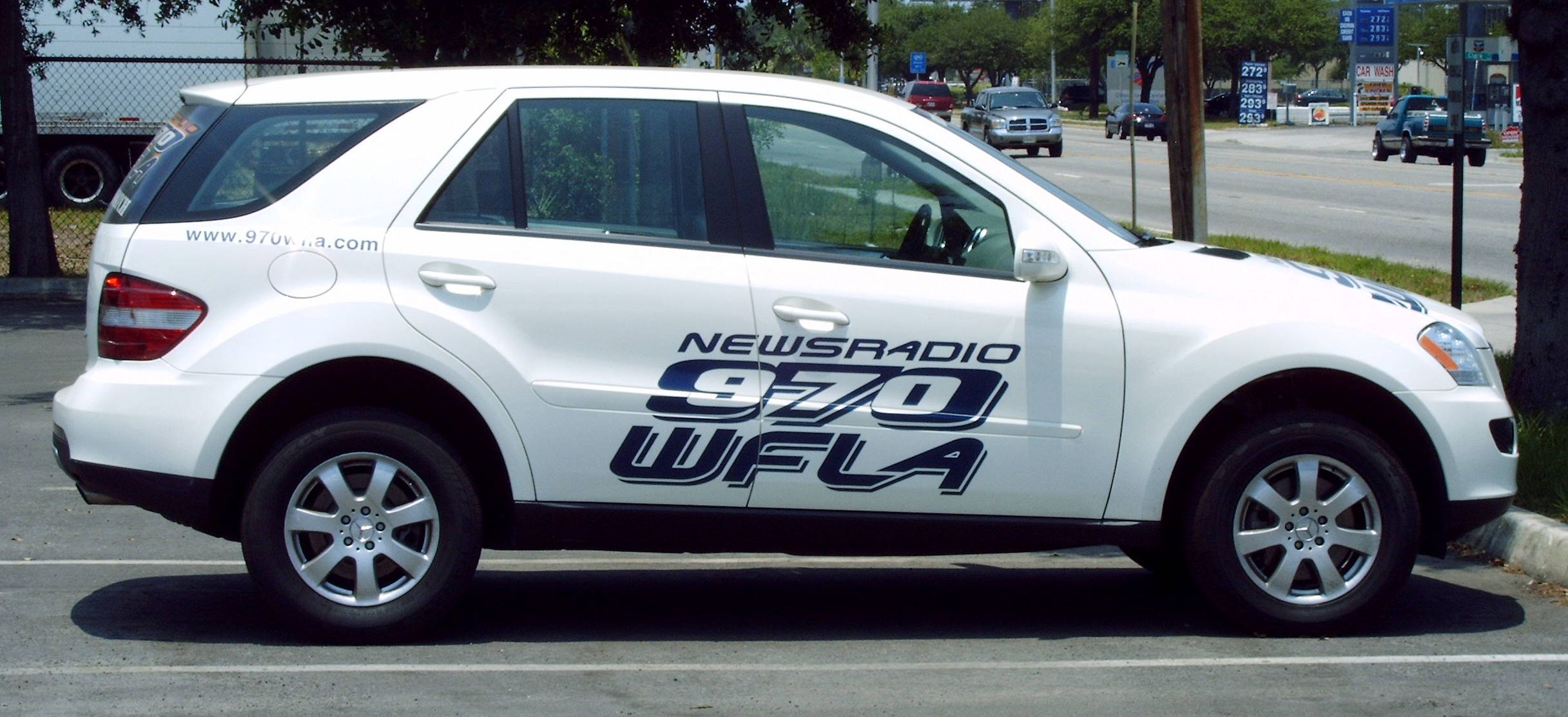
News unit with a previous logo

Once network programming had shifted from radio to television, WFLA began a full service middle of the road format of popular adult music, news, and sports. It later tried Top 40 and adult contemporary music. In the 1980s, listeners shifted to FM to hear music, so WFLA increased the news and talk programming. In 1982, WFLA hired street reporter Sam Cardinale from WPLP to make the move toward news-oriented programming. Cardinale won multiple Associated Press and United Press International awards for the station for news coverage before joining WTVT. In 1986, WFLA made the full transition to all-talk. It has been the market leader in this format ever since, and usually is among the top five stations in the market, according to Arbitron ratings.

=== Changes in ownership ===
Media General acquired the Tribune Company in the 1970s. This meant one company controlled, in Tampa, a newspaper, TV station, AM station and FM station. However, the Federal Communications Commission (FCC) were discouraging one owner from controlling so much media in one market. In the 1980s, federal regulations forced Media General to divest the radio stations because of its other holdings. The radio stations were sold to Blair Broadcasting in late 1982. Sconnix Communications of Charleston, South Carolina, bought WFLA and what was then WPDS from Blair Broadcasting in 1987. Blair was divesting all of its English-language broadcasting properties to concentrate on its Spanish-language TV network, Telemundo. Jacor Communications purchased WFLA from Sconnix in 1988. In 1989, the station moved from Jackson Street in downtown Tampa to its present location at 4002 W. Gandy Blvd., in south Tampa. Clear Channel Communications, purchased Jacor in 1999, which included WFLA and WFLZ. Clear Channel was the forerunner of today's iHeartMedia.

== Past personalities ==
WFLA gave national hosts Glenn Beck and Lionel their starts in talk radio. For many years, Todd Schnitt hosted the nationally syndicated Schnitt Show at WFLA. Other prominent alumni, from the days when the station concentrated on local programming, include Bob Lassiter, Jay Marvin, Dick Norman, Jack Ellery and Freddy Mertz. Other former hosts include Al Gardner, Mark Larsen, Daniel Ruth, Mark Beiro, Paul Gonzalez and Mel Berman.

Over the years, AM Tampa Bay has had three female co-hosts; Sharon Taylor, who was let go after ten years, Allyson Turner, who left less than a year after she was hired, and Corey Dylan, who was promoted to her own show at sister station WMTX after four years on WFLA. Longtime news anchors and reporters Steve Hall and Sharon Parker were released in a 2019 iHeart round of layoffs. In March 2023, longtime AM Tampa Bay host Jack Harris was released from the station. Harris had been with WFLA off and on since 1970.

== Programming ==
Ryan Gorman and Dana McKay host WFLA's morning show; the remainder of the schedule is nationally-syndicated conservative talk shows largely sourced from Premiere Networks.

== Translators ==
Broadcast translators for WXTB-HD2
Call sign	Frequency	City of license	FID	ERP (W)	HAAT	Class	FCC info
W256CT	99.1 FM	Bayonet Point, Florida	151584	250	420 m (1,378 ft)	D	LMS
W233AV	94.5 FM	Gulfport, Florida	146121	250	184 m (604 ft)	D	LMS
