= WLCC =

Simulcast of WTBN, Pinellas Park
- Brandon, Florida; United States
- Broadcast area: Tampa Bay Area
- Frequency: 760 kHz
- Branding: Faith Talk

Programming
- Language: English
- Format: Christian radio
- Affiliations: SRN News; USA Radio Network

Ownership
- Owner: Salem Media Group; (Salem Communications Holding Corporation)
- Sister stations: WGUL; WTBN

History
- First air date: 1988; 38 years ago
- Former call signs: WJCZ (1986); WEND (1986–1993); WBDN (1993–1999)
- Call sign meaning: "La Classica"

Technical information
- Licensing authority: FCC
- Facility ID: 71212
- Class: B
- Power: 10,000 watts (day); 1,000 watts (night)
- Transmitter coordinates: 28°1′30.1″N 82°17′1.3″W
- Translator: (104.3 MHz) W282CI (Tampa)

Links
- Public license information: Public file; LMS
- Webcast: Listen live
- Website: letstalkfaith.com

WLCC (760 AM) is a radio station broadcasting a Christian radio format, simulcasting WTBN. Licensed to Brandon, Florida, United States, it serves the Tampa Bay area. WLCC is owned by Salem Media Group.

== History ==
The station began broadcasting in 1988 under owner Bruce Micek's Asti Broadcasting using the call letters WEND and was the flagship station of the Sun Radio Network. In 1993 the station was sold to Sonny Bloch's Bloch Broadcasting and call letters changed to WBDN the station then broadcast significant blocks of brokered business programming from the Financial Broadcasting Network. In 1996 Spanish broadcaster Alfredo Alonso's Mega Broadcasting purchased the station for $1.75 million (later renamed Mega Communications) turning the station into a Spanish Tropical format called Mega 760. Since then the station has adopted different formats including Regional Mexican and Spanish oldies.

Mega Communications donated WLCC to the Washington, DC–based Minority Media & Telecom Council (MMTC) in December 2008.

Logo as "Radio Luz"

On May 31, 2012, the MMTC sold WLCC to Salem Communications for $1.15 million, with the intent to reformat the station with a Spanish Christian format under the Radio Luz branding. The transaction was consummated on August 31, 2012.

The station broadcasts with 10,000 watts during the day and 1,000 watts at night, nulled towards the southeast by day to protect West Palm Beach's WEFL, and directional towards the southwest at night, to protect Detroit's WJR.

On July 25, 2019, Salem Media Group agreed to sell WLCC, WWMI as well as WKAT and WZAB in the Miami market to Immaculate Heart Media, Inc. for more than $8.2 million. Salem Media Group repurchased WLCC and translator W282CI from Relevant Radio for $600,000 effective February 15, 2022; Relevant Radio continues to own WWMI.
