= WMTX =

Adult contemporary radio station in Tampa, Florida

Coordinates: 27.820°N 82.261°W

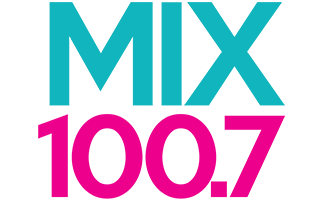
- Tampa, Florida; United States
- Broadcast area: Tampa Bay area
- Frequency: 100.7 MHz (HD Radio)
- Branding: Mix 100.7

Programming
- Language: English
- Format: Adult contemporary
- Subchannels: HD2: WHNZ simulcast (Talk/business); HD3: "Retro" (Bilingual classic hits)
- Affiliations: Premiere Networks

Ownership
- Owner: iHeartMedia; (iHM Licenses, LLC)
- Sister stations: WDAE; WDAE-FM; WFLA; WFLZ-FM; WFUS; WHNZ; WXTB

History
- First air date: November 1947
- Former call signs: WDAE-FM (1947–1966, 1969–1975); WATL-FM (1966–1968); WAVV (1975–1978); WJYW (1978–1982); WIQI (1982–1986); WUSA-FM (1986–1996); WUKS (1996–1998); WAKS (1998–1999)
- Call sign meaning: "Tampa Bay's Mix 100.7" (transposed)

Technical information
- Licensing authority: FCC
- Facility ID: 23078
- Class: C
- ERP: 96,000 watts
- HAAT: 472 meters (1,549 ft)

Links
- Public license information: Public file; LMS
- Webcast: Listen live (via iHeartRadio); HD3: Listen live (via iHeartRadio)
- Website: tampabaysmix.iheart.com

WMTX (100.7 FM) is a commercial radio station in Tampa, Florida, known as "Mix 100.7". It has an adult contemporary radio format, switching to Christmas music for much of November and December. It is owned by iHeartMedia, with its studios and offices on Gandy Boulevard in Tampa. WMTX serves as the primary Emergency Alert System station for the Tampa Bay area.

WMTX has an effective radiated power (ERP) of 96,000 watts, its transmitter site is off Rhodine Road in Riverview. WMTX broadcasts using HD Radio technology; its HD-2 digital subchannel airs a simulcast of WHNZ's talk/business format, while their HD-3 subchannel carries "Retro," a Bilingual classic hits format.

== History ==
=== CBS programming and beautiful music ===
On May 29, 1947, a letter authorizing the original station licensed as WDAE-FM for 1.000 watts at 105.7 MHz was issued by the Federal Communications Commission (FCC). A construction permit was issued on April 6, 1949, with a power increase to 26 KW. On November 30, 1950, the construction permit was modified for operation on 100.7 MHz at 65 KW. The license was issued on May 1, 1951. WDAE-FM simulcast co-owned WDAE (1250 AM), and the two stations were owned by the Tampa Times newspaper. WDAE-AM-FM were CBS Radio Network affiliates, running its dramas, comedies, news, sports and other programming during the Golden Age of Radio. The station carried the WATL-FM call sign from 1966 to 1969, returning to WDAE-FM after three years.

In the late 1960s, WDAE-FM flipped to beautiful music, airing quarter-hour sweeps of mostly instrumental cover versions of popular songs, as well as Broadway and Hollywood show tunes. To give it a separate identity from its AM sister station, which aired teen-oriented Top 40 music, the FM station changed its call letters to WAVV in 1975, to represent the word "Wave". During the WAVV years, the station's tagline was "Waves of Beautiful Music". In 1978, the call sign changed to WJYW, to represent the word "Joy".

=== Adult contemporary ===
In 1982, the station flipped from beautiful music to adult contemporary and the call sign changed to WIQI ("W-101"). In 1986, the call sign changed to WUSA-FM (sharing the call sign with a Gannett sister station, Washington D.C. CBS television affiliate WUSA-TV), while still being named "W-101" before rebranding as simply "101 WUSA" in July 1994.

In December 1996, after Gannett traded the station to Jacor, the station flipped to hot adult contemporary and rebranded as "100.7 Kiss FM", with the call letters changing to WUKS. In 1998, the call letters were changed to WAKS. During the "Kiss" era, the station was the home of the popular, locally syndicated Mason Dixon Morning Show. On August 28, 1999, at midnight, the station became "Mix 100.7", and the call sign changed to WMTX (which was first used on 95.7 FM as "Mix 96"). Community outrage was highly noted in local newspapers and on other radio stations. Under the "Mix" branding, the station flipped to a mainstream adult contemporary format. The station initially carried Casey's Top 20 countdown, hosted by Casey Kasem, and Backtrax USA. The format gradually shifted to adult top 40.

=== iHeartMedia ownership ===
Both WMTX and its AM counterpart, WDAE, were acquired by Clear Channel Communications in 1999. In 2020, WMTX shifted from adult top 40, returning to adult contemporary music, but still calling itself "Mix 100.7".

== Christmas music ==
In 2019, for the first time in its history, WMTX flipped to all-Christmas music for the holiday season, a week before WDUV or Joy FM (88.1, 91.5 and 91.7) usually flip to all-Christmas. They still regularly continue this practice every year, typically the week before Thanksgiving. This is not unusual of iHeartRadio AC stations to do, as dozens of sister stations across the country also flip to Christmas music.

Despite raising ratings for the station, WMTX does not usually get the greatest Christmas music audience. In recent years, WDUV has been flipping to Christmas music earlier than WMTX and have soared in the ratings. However, WMTX still generally reaches a higher market share in the Holiday Season.

== WMTX-HD2 ==
Former logo of WMTX-HD2

In early 2007, WMTX launched an HD2 digital subchannel with a soft AC format. On December 17, 2007, WMTX-HD2 dropped the soft AC format to introduce the LGBTQ-oriented "Pride Radio" service, featuring dance and rhythmic hits.

On January 28, 2013, WMTX-HD2 changed its format to classic rock, branded as "Thunder Tampa Bay", and began to be relayed on FM translators W233AV 94.5 (Gulfport) and W290BJ 105.9 (West Tampa). On September 24, 2014, WMTX-HD2 started simulcasting on W256CT 99.1 (Bayonet Point). In the fall of 2015, WMTX-HD2 began simulcasting on translator W275AZ 102.9 (Wesley Chapel South). The "Thunder" branding and format was previously used on sister station WTBT 105.5/103.5 (now WFUS) from 1995 to 2005.

On June 3, 2016, WMTX-HD2 shifted its format to classic hits, still branded as "Thunder Tampa Bay". However, one month later, WMTX-HD2 returned to classic rock, still branded as "Thunder Tampa Bay".

On December 13, 2016, WMTX-HD2 flipped to classic hip hop as "Throwback 94.5 & 105.9", complementing urban contemporary sister station WBTP.

On January 11, 2019, WMTX-HD2 announced that it would be changing its format the following Monday, and began directing listeners to WBTP. On January 14, W233AV, W256CT and W290BJ began simulcasting news/talk-formatted WFLA. The classic hip hop format continued on WMTX's HD2 sub-channel, with the HD3 subchannel carrying "The Breeze", a soft AC format from iHeartRadio.

On July 26, 2021, WMTX-HD2 changed their format to a simulcast of Spanish news/talk-formatted WHNZ, branded as "Acción 1250".
