= Jack Harris (broadcaster) =

American radio personality (born 1941)

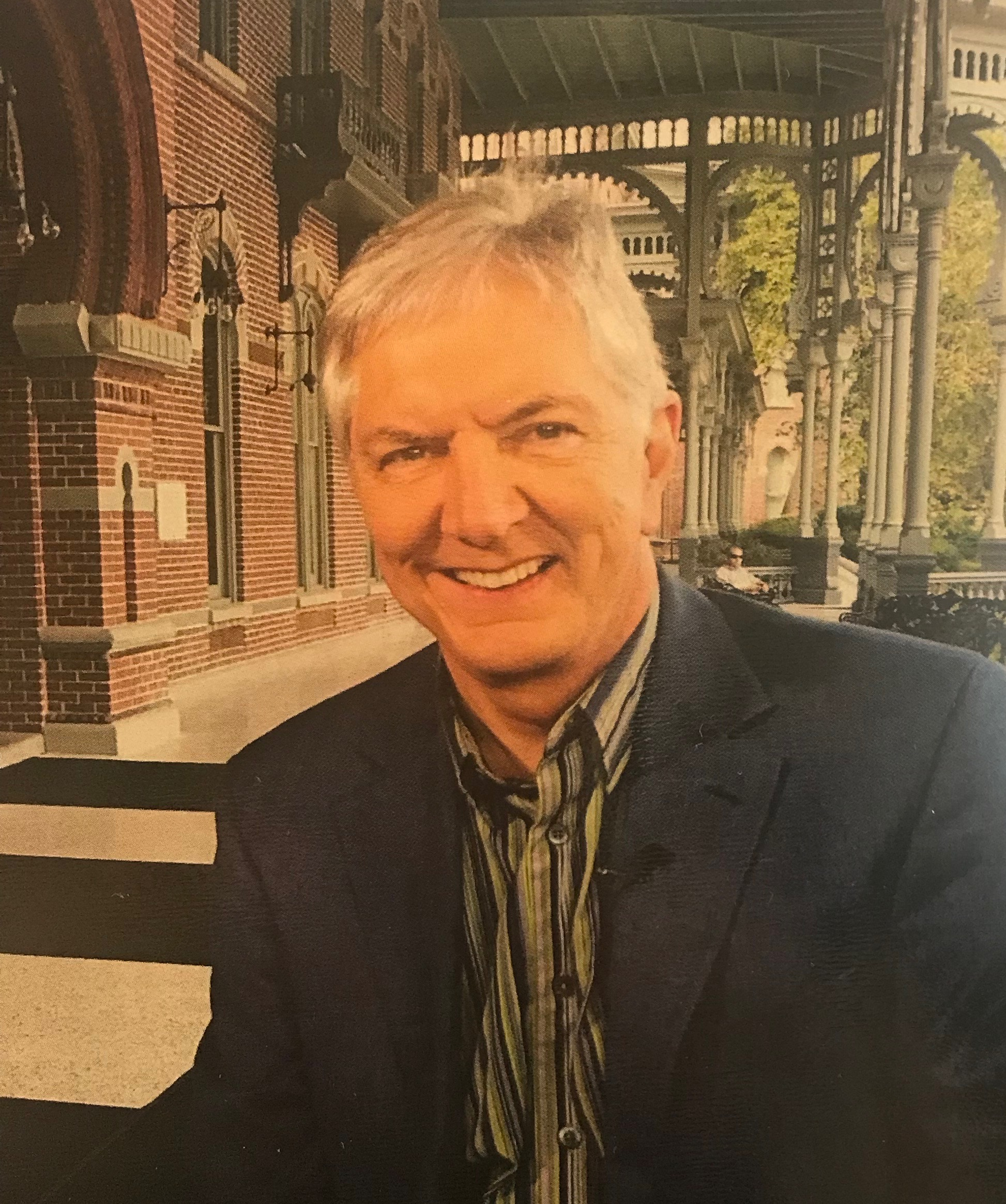
- Born: September 18, 1941 (age 84); Logan, West Virginia, U.S.
- Education: West Virginia University
- Occupation: Broadcaster
- Spouse: Joy Harris
- Children: 1
- Honours: Tampa Bay Sports Hall of Fame

William H. Harris Jr., known as Jack Harris, is an American radio personality in the Tampa Bay Area of Florida. He has been involved in radio, television, and sports broadcasts in that market since 1970.

== Early life ==
Bucky Harris, as he was called for the first 30 years of his life, was born in Logan, West Virginia. His childhood was spent in West Virginia, Virginia, and Japan before returning to Logan. As a teenager, his career began at WVOW radio in Logan, and in 1959, he graduated from Logan High School as valedictorian, then attended Davidson College in North Carolina on a ministerial scholarship for two years. He changed his major to history and transferred to West Virginia University, where he worked at WAJR radio in Morgantown, followed by two years of service in the U.S. Army. Twice, Harris was nominated as a finalist for the Radio Hall of Fame.

== Career ==
A distinguished military graduate of ROTC, Harris served for two years as a lieutenant in the US Army's intelligence branch, with tours in the Dominican Republic and Vietnam. He then returned to the radio in 1968 at WAJR in Morgantown, West Virginia. Jack (aka Bucky) saw the need for a delay switch at his small-town radio station and created one in the low-budget studio by looping a tape through two tape recorders, creating a 7-second delay and allowing live call-ins for a talk show.

A job offer brought Harris to WFLA radio in Tampa in 1970, taking on his radio name, Jack Harris. After the success of his 1974 45 rpm record, "The Floridians (A Yankee's Opinion)", Harris was offered over 20 radio jobs across the country. He took the job of morning DJ at WRC radio in Washington D.C., working alongside Willard Scott. When NBC switched to an all-news format, Harris was moved to the FM station. He became the first disc jockey on the first disco station at the then-sister station WKYS, returning to Tampa and WFLA in 1975.

Harris' radio career kept him at WFLA for the next ten years, where he started the first talk radio station in Tampa following overnight exclusive coverage of Hurricane Elena in 1986, before co-hosting the "Q-Morning Zoo" on rival WRBQ, then returning to WFLA sister-station WFLZ, then "Power 93 - The Power Pig" in the late 1980s and early 1990s. He has since left music radio, hosting the news/talk program "AM Tampa Bay" on WFLA with Tedd Webb since 1993.

He has television experience as the voice of The Jerry Lewis Telethon for eight years (Jack's Kids), Gasparilla and Festival of States Parade Coverage, hosting a show with then Tampa Bay Buccaneers Coaches Show with John McKay on WTOG, hosting the nationally ranked afternoon program "Pulse Plus!" on WTVT between 1984 and 1989, hosting "NewsWatch 8 at Noon" and his own talk show "Harris and Company" on WFLA TV until 2000, restaurant reviewer on Bay News 9 in the early 2000s, an evening commentary on WFTS, and co-hosting "The Mayors Hour" with the sitting Tampa mayor on cable access, since 1996.

He has published a book of humorous essays titled Jack Harris Unwrapped, served as Alcalde of Ybor City (Honorary mayor) for 6 years, and previously provided voice-over announcements at Tampa International Airport. Jack and his radio team first suggested naming the Cross-town Expressway after Lee Roy Selmon and sponsored a contest to come up with the name for the Buccaneers and the arena name for the USF Sun Dome. Harris' sports broadcasting has included radio play-by-play for the original broadcast team of the NFL's expansion Tampa Bay Buccaneers, the South Florida Bulls college basketball, the Tampa Bay Rowdies NASL soccer team, the Tampa Bay Bandits USFL football team, the Tampa Bay Storm Arena Football League team, and the annual Outback Bowl; in addition to pre-game and half-time shows for the Buccaneers and promotions with the Tampa Bay Lightning of the NHL.

Harris was honored as Tampa Bay Ambassador of the Year Award for outstanding contributions to the Tourism Industry in Hillsborough County, participated in the Federal Bureau of Investigation Tampa Field Office FBI Citizens' Academy and was guest speaker at United States Citizenship ceremony inspiring new citizens. In 2017 Harris received the FBI Director's Community Leadership Award in Washington DC for his commitment to safety and security in Tampa Bay. Jack was awarded the VET 2 VET RECONNECT Lifetime Advocate Award. The Honorable Gus Bilirakis in the House of Representatives stated: "While Mr. Harris is known as the voice of Tampa Bay over decades of hosting WFLA Radio's AM Tampa Bay show, he is also a Vietnam Veteran dedicated to this country, his community, and his fellow Veterans. He uses his public personality for good: advocating for Veterans and Military causes, and giving much of his time to volunteering and charity work." Jack established a Media scholarship at the University of South Florida for students interested in going into broadcasting by donating proceeds from speaking events and was named Talk Radio's Major Market Hometown Hero. Harris is now working with the Florida Legislature to change the state bird from a Northern Mockingbird to a sea bird, allowing school children to work with the State Supervisor of Elections so they can vote on the sea bird they wish to represent the state.

As of 2020, he hosts AM Tampa Bay on WFLA in Tampa as well as offering his voice to various charity events around the Bay area. He is an inductee of the Tampa Bay Sports Hall of Fame.

Other awards and honors include: "Communicator of the Year" Tampa Toastmasters Club1980, the only media member of President Gerald Ford's WIN committee (Whip Inflation Now) in 1975, MOR Disk Jockey of the Year' finalist for Billboard Magazine, Sandra Freedman proclaimed Jack Harris Day on September 1, 1989, Mayor Pam Iorio proclaimed March 16, 2011 as Jack Harris Day, Mayor Dick Greco, proclaimed Jack Harris Day on June 15, 1998, and Jack Harris Month, October 1995 and was given the Key to the City of Tampa March 2003, Children's Home Network 2010 Helen Davis Award, MacDill Air Force Base Honorary commander, and the Tom McEwen Community Advocate Award by Moffitt Cancer Center.

In late March 2023, as Iheart radio cut budgets, he was let go.

== Personal life ==
Harris and his wife, Joy, have a son.
