= WFUS =

Country music radio station in Gulfport–Tampa, Florida

Coordinates: 27.820°N 82.261°W

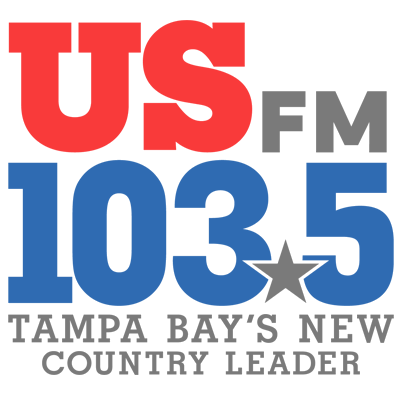
- Gulfport, Florida; United States
- Broadcast area: Tampa Bay area
- Frequency: 103.5 MHz (HD Radio)
- Branding: US 103.5

Programming
- Language: English
- Format: Country music
- Subchannels: HD2: Classic hip-hop (WBTP)
- Affiliations: Premiere Networks

Ownership
- Owner: iHeartMedia; (iHM Licenses, LLC)
- Sister stations: WDAE; WDAE-FM; WFLA; WFLZ-FM; WHNZ; WMTX; WXTB

History
- First air date: November 1963
- Former call signs: WBRD-FM (1963–1973); WDUV (1973–1999); WTBT (1999–2005)
- Former frequencies: 103.3 MHz (1963–1997)
- Call sign meaning: Florida US

Technical information
- Licensing authority: FCC
- Facility ID: 63984
- Class: C0
- ERP: 66,000 watts
- HAAT: 472 meters (1,549 ft)
- Translator: HD2: 106.5 WBTP (Tampa)

Links
- Public license information: Public file; LMS
- Webcast: Listen live (via iHeartRadio)
- Website: us1035.iheart.com

WFUS (103.5 FM) is a commercial radio station licensed to Gulfport, Florida, United States. It airs a country music format and is one of the eight stations in the Tampa Bay market owned by iHeartMedia. The studios are located on Feather Sound Drive in Clearwater.

WFUS's transmitter is sited on Colonnade Vista Drive in Riverview. WFUS broadcasts in HD Radio; the HD2 subchannel carries the classic hip hop format of co-owned WBTP (106.5 FM).

== History ==
=== WBRD-FM and WDUV ===
The station signed on the air in November 1963. It originally broadcast on 103.3 MHz and its call sign was WBRD-FM, with those call letters referring to the city of license, Bradenton. At first, WBRD-FM mostly simulcast its sister station WBRD (1420 AM). They were owned by Sunshine State Broadcasting.

After the first year, WBRD-FM switched to a beautiful music format. It was largely automated, playing quarter hour sweeps of soft, instrumental cover versions of popular adult music, along with Broadway and Hollywood show tunes. In 1973, it changed its call letters to WDUV and began calling itself "The Dove." Over time, it added more soft vocals and removed some of the instrumentals. WDUV continued to play easy listening music into the 1990s, when other beautiful stations had switched to more contemporary formats.

=== Move to 103.5 FM ===
In the early 1990s, WDUV relocated its frequency to 103.5 FM, to improve its coverage area in the Tampa Bay area. A couple of years later, WDUV was acquired by Jacor Broadcasting. Jacor relocated the studios to St. Petersburg.

On April 5, 1999, at Midnight, WDUV swapped its frequency with classic rock station WTBT. WDUV moved from 103.5 to 105.5 FM and WTBT took the 103.5 dial position. However, both frequencies retained their transmitting locations and cities of license. After the swap, WDUV became licensed to New Port Richey with transmitting facilities in Holiday, while WTBT, whose transmitter was located in Riverview, became licensed to Bradenton. (In the 2000s, the city of license changed again to Gulfport.) Shortly after the swap, Clear Channel Communications sold WDUV to its present owner, Cox Radio. Because WDUV is aimed at an older audience, Cox saw more potential gain with WTBT at 103.5.

The station formerly went by "Thunder 103.5" as a classic rock station that started on March 14, 1995, on 105.5 FM. Popular radio personality Ron Diaz was the morning drive host at that time. Towards the end of the classic rock format, WTBT was the Tampa affiliate for The Bob and Tom Show syndicated from Indianapolis.

=== Flip to Country ===
On April 13, 2005, WTBT flipped to its current country format as WFUS. It called itself "US 103.5". Its main competition is veteran country outlet WQYK 99.5 FM, owned by the Beasley Broadcast Group. That left Cox Radio's WHPT 102.5 FM as the market's only classic rock station at that time. iHeartMedia (then known as Clear Channel Communications) later relaunched the classic rock format as "Thunder Across The Bay", operating on FM translators at 94.5 FM (Gulfport), 99.1 FM (Holiday), 105.9 FM (Tampa), and on WMTX-HD2.

In August 2014, WFUS's HD2 subchannel's format changed to "Soft EZ Oldies", a format meant to compete with market leader WDUV. Prior to that, the HD2 subchannel was classic rock, branded as "Thunder 103.5 HD2".

In September 2014, WFUS-HD2 flipped once again, as alternative rock-formatted "ALT 99-9", meant to compete with Cox Radio's WSUN 97.1 FM. "ALT" was also broadcast on FM translator W207BU at 99.9 MHz, located in Bayonet Point. On November 7, 2014, at Noon, W207BU moved from 99.9 MHz to 100.3 MHz to eliminate interference with WXJB in Brooksville. The station then re-branded as "ALT 100.3". The translator also changed call letters, and is now identifying as W262CP. On March 14, 2016, the "ALT" format was replaced with a rebroadcast of iHeart's Sarasota-based tropical/Latin pop-formatted WRUB "Rumba 106.5".

WFUS was the official flagship station of the Tampa Bay Buccaneers NFL team from 2004 to 2016. Games are now airing on co-owned active rock station WXTB 97.9 FM.
