= WQOS (AM) =

Relevant Radio station in Coral Gables, Florida

- Coral Gables, Florida; United States
- Broadcast area: Miami, Florida; South Florida Metropolitan Area
- Frequency: 1080 kHz
- Branding: Relevant Radio

Programming
- Format: Catholic radio
- Network: Relevant Radio

Ownership
- Owner: Relevant Radio, Inc.

History
- First air date: February 16, 1949
- Former call signs: WVCG (1949–2006); WTPS (2006–2007); WMCU (2007–2010); WWFH (2010); WHIM (2010–2018); WKAT (2018–2019); WOCN (2019)
- Former frequencies: 1070 kHz

Technical information
- Licensing authority: FCC
- Facility ID: 74165
- Class: B
- Power: 50,000 watts (day); 10,000 watts (night)
- Transmitter coordinates: 25°44′53″N 80°32′47″W
- Translator: 97.7 W249DM (Miami)

Links
- Public license information: Public file; LMS
- Webcast: Listen live
- Website: relevantradio.com

WQOS (1080 AM) is a radio station licensed to Coral Gables, Florida, serving the South Florida Metropolitan Area, including Miami. The station is owned by Relevant Radio, Inc. and is an affiliate of Catholic talk network Relevant Radio. The transmitter is located in Everglades, Florida. Programming is also heard on low-power FM translator W249DM (97.7 FM) in Miami.

== History ==
WVCG signed on the air on February 16, 1949. It was known as the "Voice of Coral Gables" and was the Miami area's first all-Classical music station. It was owned by the Peninsula Broadcasting Company and had studios on Aragon Avenue. WVCG originally broadcast on 1070 kHz as a daytimer, powered at 1,000 watts and required to be off the air at sunset.

The station upgraded its daytime power to 50,000 watts in the 1960s and moved up the dial to 1080. Through the years, it tried various formats, including Middle of the Road, a brief stint as Oldies, and then two decades as a time brokered multi-ethnic station, mostly under the ownership of Scott Ginsburg. The station switched to an all-Talk format geared to African Americans in 2006 under Radio One, and abandoned its legacy call sign, switching to WTPS ("The Peoples' Station"). Legendary Miami disc jockey James T. was the morning host for a brief period during this time.

The station was then purchased from Radio One, its former owner, by Salem Media and assigned to its Caron Broadcasting subsidiary. The transaction was completed on April 11, 2008. Under Salem, the station adopted a Christian radio format and the WMCU call sign, both formerly associated with 89.7 FM, now a K-LOVE station, WMLV.

On April 1, 2010, the station changed its call letters to WHIM and aired English-language Christian talk programming 14 hours a day, Spanish-language Christian talk 3 hours a day and Haitian Creole programming 7 hours overnight. On June 1, 2010, WHIM began its signature program, "Sound Word Live" from 1 to 3 p.m. daily, hosted by Frank Trotta and co-hosted by Dave Mitchell, Steve James and Bernie Diaz.

In 2011, WHIM entered an agreement with WAXY to carry Miami Heat or Florida Marlins games when both teams would play at the same time. WHIM aired a Heat regular season game on April 6 of that year and carried several Marlins games during the NBA playoffs. WHIM was also the full-time radio station of Florida International University Golden Panther Football.

In 2017, "1080 The Word" carried national Christian talk and teaching shows such as Focus on the Family, John MacArthur, and Turning Point with David Jeremiah. The afternoons included Christian music and local ministry programs making all daytime programming in English.

On January 1, 2018, the station changed its call letters to WKAT following the company's sale of the previous WKAT on 1360 AM.

On July 25, 2019, Salem Media Group agreed to sell WKAT and WZAB, as well as WLCC and WWMI in Tampa Bay, to Immaculate Heart Media, Inc. for more than $8.2 million. The call sign was changed to WOCN on September 16, 2019, and to WQOS on September 26, 2019. The sale closed on September 30, 2019. Following the sale, much of WQOS's Relevant Radio programming was simulcast on WZAB until 2020, when WZAB was sold to iHeartMedia.
