= WDAE-FM =

Sports radio station located in Clearwater, Florida

Coordinates: 27.867°N 82.624°W

Simulcast of WDAE, St. Petersburg, FL
- Clearwater, Florida; United States
- Broadcast area: Tampa Bay area
- Frequency: 95.7 MHz (HD Radio)
- Branding: 95.7 WDAE & AM 620

Programming
- Format: Sports radio
- Subchannels: HD2: Black Information Network; HD3: Rumba (Spanish CHR)
- Affiliations: Fox Sports Radio; Tampa Bay Rays Radio Network

Ownership
- Owner: iHeartMedia; (iHM Licenses, LLC)
- Sister stations: WDAE; WFLA; WFLZ-FM; WFUS; WHNZ; WMTX; WXTB

History
- First air date: August 19, 1963
- Former call signs: WTAN-FM (1963–1976); WOKF (1976–1980); WCKX (1980–1982); WMGG (1982–1985); WNLT (1985–1990); WMTX (1990–1998); WSSR (1998–2003); WBTP (2003–2024); WRUB (2024–2026)
- Call sign meaning: Taken from station's simulcast of WDAE

Technical information
- Licensing authority: FCC
- Facility ID: 41382
- Class: C1
- ERP: 100,000 watts
- HAAT: 185 meters (607 ft)

Links
- Public license information: Public file; LMS
- Webcast: Listen live (via iHeartRadio)
- Website: 957wdae.iheart.com

WDAE-FM (95.7 FM) is a commercial radio station licensed to Clearwater, Florida, United States, and serves the Tampa Bay area with a sports radio format as a simulcast of WDAE (620 AM). Owned by iHeartMedia, its offices are located on Feather Sound Road in Clearwater, Florida, and the WDAE-FM transmitter is on Gandy Blvd in St Petersburg, Florida.

This station began broadcasting August 19, 1963, as WTAN-FM and historically regularly changed formats and call signs. Between 1976 and 1990, it changed call signs on five occasions. Its longest-lived format was urban contemporary as WBTP "95.7 The Beat" from 2003 to 2024. After less than two years with a Spanish-language format, it flipped to sports talk on February 23, 2026.

== History ==
This station signed on August 19, 1963, as WTAN-FM, simulcasting sister station WTAN (AM 1340) with a beautiful music format. The WTAN stations were sold in 1976 to Broadcast Enterprises, Inc., a company controlled by Ragan Henry, and relaunched. This included a new format for the FM station, which ceased simulcasting WTAN, changed call signs to WOKF, and began airing an adult contemporary format.

WOKF later became a disco station under the name 96 Fever before switching back to a hot adult contemporary sound as WCKX "96 Kx" in 1980, under the new ownership of Metroplex. Two years later, the station rebranded as Magic and adopted the call sign WMGG, shifting away from a rock lean. So frequent were its changes that a 1982 article in the St. Petersburg Times called it "the champion of the format changers".

In 1984, WMGG hired Cleveland disc jockey John Lanigan to host mornings. However, ratings continued to slide. In 1985, the station retooled again to a music-intensive adult contemporary station as WNLT "Lite 95.7". The change in format sidelined Lanigan. The revamped station also promoted itself as "W-Lite", which earned it a lawsuit from CBS, which argued that the use of "95" in identification was too close to its WYNF (94.9 FM).

WNLT rebranded as WMTX "Mix 96" in 1990 but retained the format. Radio & Records reported that the change was preemptive amid rumors that WRBQ-FM would begin going by "Mix 104.7". The station shifted from hot adult contemporary to an alternative rock and pop music format as WSSR "Star 95.7" on August 4, 1997.

On October 27, 2003, WSSR adopted an urban contemporary format as WBTP (“95.7 The Beat”), getting out of the more crowded adult contemporary format market in Tampa Bay.

On July 17, 2024, the urban format moved to sister station WRUB (106.5 FM), which had been broadcasting a Spanish-language contemporary hits format as “Rumba 106.5". The Rumba format was moved to the 95.7 frequency. The two stations swapped call signs on July 29.

On February 13, 2026, iHeartMedia announced that "Rumba" would move to translators W237CW (95.3 FM) and W275AZ (102.9 FM) on February 23. The FM simulcast of WDAE's sports radio programming, in turn, moved from W237CW to WRUB's 100,000-watt signal at 95.7 FM, and WRUB changed call signs to WDAE-FM. The WDAE-FM call sign had previously been held by WMTX (100.7 FM) from 1947 to 1966 and 1969 to 1975.

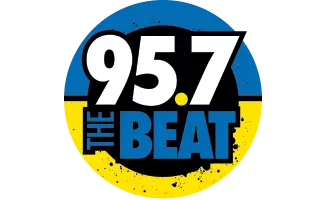
Former "95.7 The Beat" logo from 2019-2021.

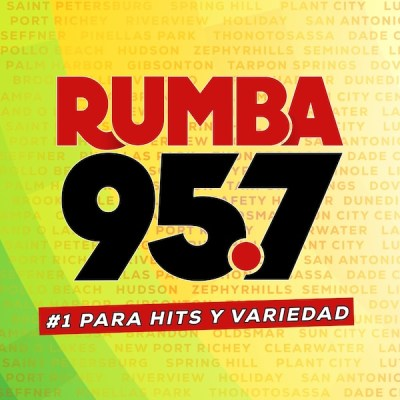
Previous "Rumba 95.7" logo from 2024-2026.

== HD Radio ==
WDAE-FM HD1 carries the main WDAE-FM program.

WDAE-FM HD2 carries the Black Information Network.

"Rumba 95.3 and 102.9" logo

WDAE-FM HD3 broadcasts a Spanish contemporary hit radio format known as "Rumba" which is also simulcast on three analog translator stations W237CW (95.3 FM), W275AZ (102.9 FM) and W244BE (96.7 FM). WDAE-FM HD3 is marketed as Rumba 95.3 and 102.9.
