= Tampa Times =

Daily newspaper in Tampa, Florida

The Tampa Times
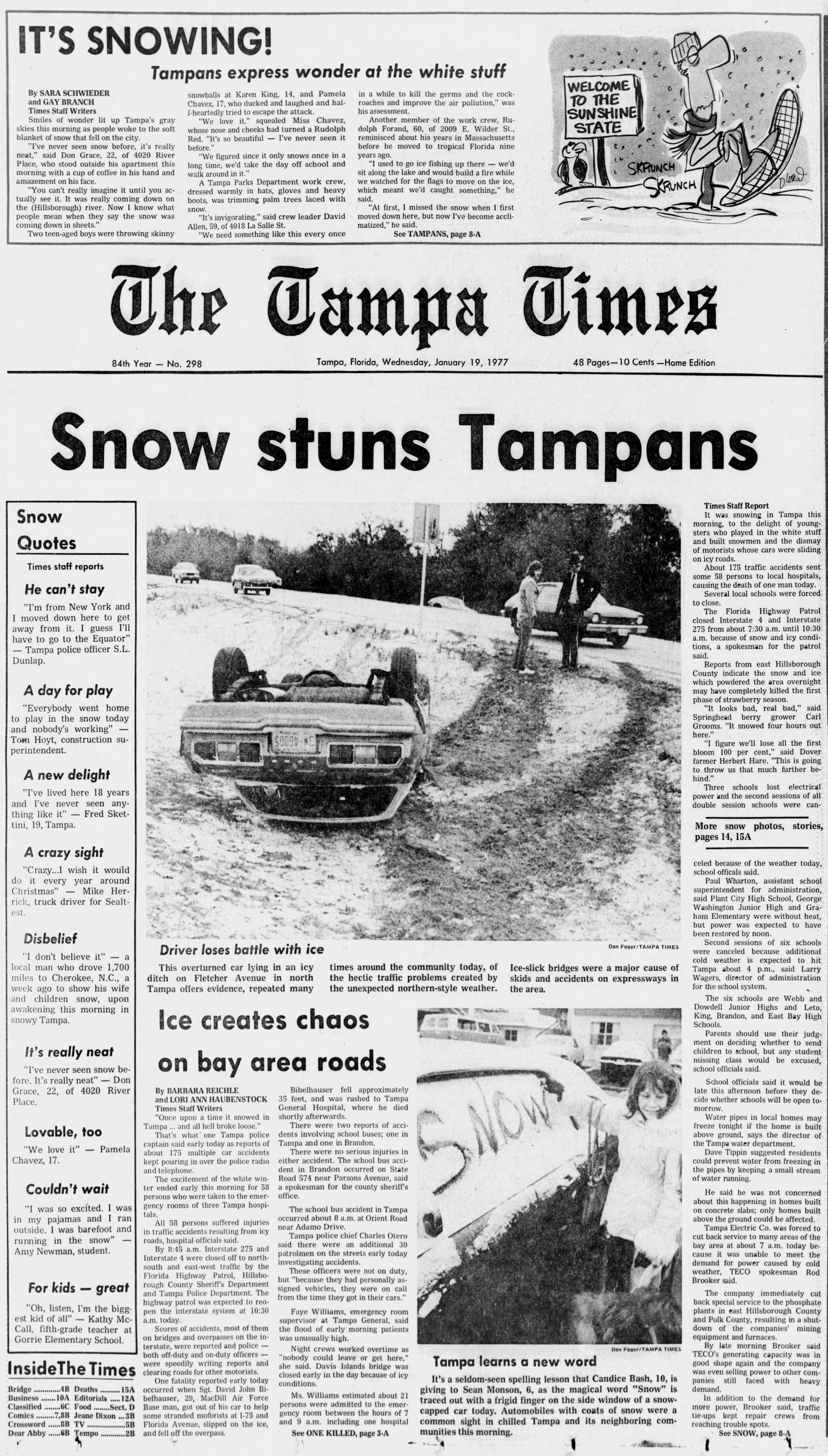
- Front page on January 19, 1977, after a rare snow in Florida
- Type: Daily newspaper
- Format: Broadsheet
- Owner: Tampa Publishing Company
- Founded: 1893; 133 years ago
- Ceased publication: 1982

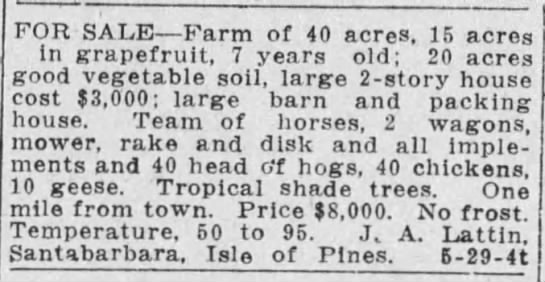
Jarvis Andrew Lattin (1853-1941) farm for sale in The Tampa Times of Tampa, Florida on June 4, 1919

The Tampa Times, or Tampa Daily Times, was a daily newspaper founded in Tampa, Florida, in 1893. It was started by the consolidation of two newspapers by the Tampa Publishing Company, whose vice president was W. B. Henderson, a leading businessperson in Tampa. D.B. McKay was the publisher.

The newspaper was an early leader in broadcasting, first putting WDAE 1250 AM on the air in 1922 (now on 620 AM). Then in 1947, an FM station was added, WDAE-FM 105.7 (now WMTX 100.7 FM). Also in the late 1940s, the company applied for a broadcast television station license and was denied.

In 1952, the Tampa Times was acquired by its rival daily newspaper, the Tampa Tribune, which had a television station.

The Tampa Tribune continued printing the Tampa Times for a number of decades, maintaining the "Times" moniker in competition with the St. Petersburg Times, another newspaper in the Tampa Bay area.

After the Tampa Tribune stopped publishing its Tampa Times edition in 1982, it continued to hold the rights on the name, leading to a lawsuit filed by Media General, owner of the Tampa Tribune, against the St. Petersburg Times. The two companies reached an agreement in 2006, by which the Media General keep its exclusive right to use of Tampa Times for another five years; the window expired in 2011, and on January 1, 2012, the St. Petersburg Times was renamed the Tampa Bay Times.

In 2016, the Tampa Bay Times bought the Tampa Tribune, effectively consolidating the history of the original 1893 Tampa Times into its present-day namesake.
