= WDAE =

Sports radio station in St. Petersburg, Florida, United States

- St. Petersburg, Florida; United States
- Broadcast area: Tampa Bay Area
- Frequency: 620 kHz
- Branding: 95.7 WDAE & AM 620

Programming
- Format: Sports radio
- Affiliations: Fox Sports Radio; Tampa Bay Rays Radio Network

Ownership
- Owner: iHeartMedia; (iHM Licenses, LLC)
- Sister stations: WDAE-FM; WFLA; WFLZ-FM; WFUS; WHNZ; WMTX; WXTB

History
- First air date: November 1, 1927
- Former frequencies: WSUN-WFLA (1927–1937); WSUN (1937–1999); WSAA (1999–2000); WHNZ (2000)

Technical information
- Licensing authority: FCC
- Facility ID: 74198
- Class: B
- Power: 5,600 watts (day); 5,500 watts (night); STA 11,280 watts (day); STA 11,000 watts (night)
- Transmitter coordinates: 27°52′38.1″N 82°35′25.4″W
- Repeater: 95.7 WDAE-FM (Clearwater, FL)

Links
- Public license information: Public file; LMS
- Webcast: Listen live (via iHeartRadio)
- Website: 957wdae.iheart.com

WDAE (620 AM) is a commercial radio station licensed to St. Petersburg, Florida, United States, and serving the Tampa Bay area. Owned by iHeartMedia, WDAE and co-owned WDAE-FM 95.7 simulcast a sports radio format. WDAE is the successor to WSUN, which went on the air in 1927; the current WDAE call sign was installed in 2000. The station's studios and offices are on Ulmerton Road in Clearwater, Pinellas County, while its transmitter site is located near the Gandy Bridge in St. Petersburg.

WDAE is licensed to broadcast with 5,600 watts by day and 5,500 watts at night. However, because the signal is subject to interference from high-powered Cuban stations, since 1983 the Federal Communications Commission (FCC) has given WDAE a series of special temporary authority (STA) grants for higher powers of 11,280 watts daytime and 11,000 watts nighttime. It uses a directional antenna at night. WDAE used to use the iBiquity HD radio system during daytime hours.

== History ==
=== WSUN jointly licensed with WFLA as WFLA-WSUN ===
WSUN was first authorized in October 1927, joining an existing station, WFLA, on 590 kHz, with this station now assigned a dual call sign of WFLA-WSUN, under shared ownership by the Clearwater and St. Petersburg Chambers of Commerce. WSUN made its debut broadcast on November 1, using the slogan "Why Stay Up North".

In 1927 WFLA-WSUN moved to 580 kHz, then to 900 kHz the next year. In 1929, radio frequencies for stations in Florida were reallocated, and WFLA-WSUN moved to 620 kHz.

The station's transmitter site was originally on the north side of the Courtney Campbell Causeway near Clearwater, Florida.

=== First directional antenna in the United States ===
WFLA-WSUN's move to 620 kHz resulted in a nighttime interference complaint from another station on that frequency: WTMJ in Milwaukee, Wisconsin. WFLA-WSUN was ordered to reduce power from 1,000 watts night and 2,500 watts day to 250 watts night and 500 watts day.

Station manager Walter Tison began an investigation into whether there was a way that WFLA-WSUN could increase its nighttime power to a more acceptable level. Working with T. A. M. Craven, a British engineer, Raymond M. Wilmotte, was engaged in 1932 to construct a then-theoretical antenna system that would reduce the signal sent toward Milwaukee. The idea that a directional antenna would resolve the issue was somewhat controversial, with some doubters stating that fluctuations in the ionosphere would cause issues, while others believed that instead of going directly to Milwaukee, the WFLA-WSUN signal was actually traveling west through the Gulf of Mexico, then turning north through the Mississippi valley.

The directional antenna installation, the first in the United States, consisting of two 200-foot (61 m) towers, was successful. As an example of its effectiveness, engineer Wilmotte noted that at one point a telegram was sent from regulators in Washington asking why WFLA-WSUN was off the air, because an inspector located in Atlanta was not receiving the station when it employed the directional antenna. Ultimately WSUN was allowed to operate full-time with 5,000 watts.

=== WSUN and WFLA switch to separate licenses ===
In 1937, the joint ownership of WFLA-WSUN was severed, with the two stations continuing to operate on 620 kHz using a common transmitter, but separately licensed on a time-sharing basis. WSUN was allocated full-time use of Tuesdays, Thursdays, and Saturdays, and shared hours on Sundays.

=== WSUN becomes full-time station after WFLA transfer ===
In 1941, WFLA moved to 940 kHz, which allowed WSUN to begin operating with unlimited hours on 620 kHz.

WSUN's transmitter site moved to straddling the west end of the Gandy Causeway with 501 ft (153 m) towers on concrete pilings in the Tampa Bay salt water in the early 1950s at 5 kW. As late as the 1990s, the original tower bases remained in their field. In its early years, WSUN was an ABC Radio affiliate, carrying the network's schedule until the 1960s, when it moved to a full service middle of the road music format. The city sold the station in the mid-1960s due to network and programming complications with WSUN's sister television station which had been established in 1953.

Through the 1970s and 1980s, WSUN aired country music.

Until 1974, WSUN offered a variety of programming including dramas, talk, music, and was an ABC affiliate. In 1974 then-owner Plough flipped the easy listening music format to country, eventually making the station one of the most successful AM stations in Florida. By the mid-1980s, music audiences had moved to FM, and then-owner CBS Radio switched to all news, which was unsuccessful, eventually switching back to country music.

In 1987 new owner Cox Radio changed upon purchase to a hot talk format and the station was the home of the popular syndicated morning program The Ron & Ron Show as well as hosting the Hooters-on-the-Radio show, Bob Lassiter, and a variety of other programs, including a psychic call-in show with Gary Spivey. For a brief period, the station simulcasted programming from sister stations KFI in Los Angeles and WIOD in Miami, including Neil Rogers, Rick and Suds, and Chris Baker. The station also broadcast Miami Dolphins football.

Due to major interference from Cuban stations, from the 1990s the Federal Communications Commission (FCC) granted WSUN special temporary authority (STA) to operate at 10 kW, twice the maximum power normally allowed for stations operating on "regional" frequencies.

All RF and electrical power and control cabling was run under the divided Gandy Highway in conduits that have an access manhole in the median and rise up out of the ground to the tower platform on the south side of Gandy "Redneck Riviera" Beach. The City of St. Petersburg eventually placed a channel 38 antenna on top of the north tower and a microwave reflector to deliver the programming to the transmitter building below. The weathered towers were replaced with shorter self supporters in the early 2000s with LED lighting.

The nationally syndicated program "Smoke This" got its start on WSUN, now on WFLA. Eventually, WSUN morphed into sports, becoming the flagship for the Tampa Bay Lightning, but dropped all talk programming by 1995, when it switched to an adult standards music format. On January 1, 1998, with a pending station sale, 620 kHz became a simulcast of Bay News 9, and the call sign was changed to WSAA. The WSUN call sign and format moved to 910 kHz.

=== WDAE moves to 620 ===
On January 1, 2000, three Tampa Bay radio stations were involved in a frequency swap. WDAE and its sports format moved from 1250 to 620. Business-formatted WHNZ, which Clear Channel Communications had acquired from Paxson Communications in 1998, switched from AM 570 to WDAE's previous home at 1250. Clear Channel then put a news/talk format on AM 570, changing the call letters to WTBN, which stood for "Tampa Bay News". Salem Communications acquired WTBN the following year, installing a Christian radio format.

In late 2012, WDAE became the Tampa Bay home of ESPN Radio, as rival sports station WHBO (1040 AM) switched affiliation to NBC Sports Radio. In 2024, ESPN programming left WDAE. It began carrying shows from Fox Sports Radio most hours, except for a local wake up show and afternoon drive time program. WTMP picked up ESPN programming.

On November 28, 2018, WDAE rebranded as "95.3 WDAE", using its FM translator in its branding.

=== Move to 95.7 FM ===
On February 13, 2026, iHeartMedia (Note: Clear Channel became iHeartMedia on September 16, 2014.) announced that WDAE's FM simulcast would move from the 95.3 translator to WRUB (95.7 FM), with a call letter change to WDAE-FM, on February 23, with 95.3 taking on WRUB's previous "Rumba" programming.

== Programming ==
Two local shows are heard on weekdays on WDAE: Pat Donovan and Aaron Jacobson with "The Pat and Aaron Show" in mornings, and Tom Krasniqi during late afternoons. In other parts of the day, WDAE airs syndicated programming from Fox Sports Radio.

=== Sports team associations ===
WDAE is the flagship station for the Tampa Bay Rays baseball team. It is also the Tampa Bay home of South Florida Bulls football and Florida Gators men's basketball games. Each year, WDAE carries the Firestone Grand Prix of St. Petersburg auto race.

The station had been the flagship station for Tampa Bay Buccaneers football. Beginning with the 2017 season, the team's broadcasts moved to co-owned active rock station WXTB. WDAE continues to air interviews with players and coaches during game weeks.

WDAE had also been the flagship radio station for the Tampa Bay Lightning of the National Hockey League (which is now on WHPT). WDAE had also broadcast the Tampa Bay Storm of the Arena Football League (later heard on sister station WHNZ).

== See also ==
- WSUN-TV
