= Bayonet Point, Florida =

- CDP
- Location of Bayonet Point in Pasco County, Florida.
- Coordinates: 28°19′33″N 82°40′59″W
- Country: United States
- State: Florida
- County: Pasco

Area
  - Total: 5.73 sq mi (14.83 km^{2})
  - Land: 5.68 sq mi (14.71 km^{2})
  - Water: 0.046 sq mi (0.12 km^{2})
- Elevation: 26 ft (7.9 m)

Population (2020)
  - Total: 26,713
  - Density: 4,702.5/sq mi (1,815.64/km^{2})
- Time zone: UTC-5 (Eastern (EST))
  - Summer (DST): UTC-4 (EDT)
- ZIP code: 34667
- Area code: 727
- FIPS code: 12-04162
- GNIS feature ID: 2402667

Bayonet Point is a census-designated place (CDP) in Pasco County, Florida, United States. As of the 2020 census, Bayonet Point had a population of 26,713.

== Geography ==
According to the United States Census Bureau, the CDP has a total area of 5.7 square miles (15 km^{2}), of which 5.6 square miles (15 km^{2}) is land and 0.1 square miles (0.26 km^{2}) (1.41%) is water.

== Demographics ==
Historical population
Census	Pop.	Note	%±
1980	16,455		—
1990	21,860		32.8%
2000	23,577		7.9%
2020	26,713		—

=== 2020 census ===
As of the 2020 census, Bayonet Point had a population of 26,713. The median age was 50.1 years. 17.6% of residents were under the age of 18 and 29.6% of residents were 65 years of age or older. For every 100 females there were 89.6 males, and for every 100 females age 18 and over there were 86.5 males age 18 and over.

100.0% of residents lived in urban areas, while 0.0% lived in rural areas.

There were 11,825 households in Bayonet Point, of which 22.2% had children under the age of 18 living in them. Of all households, 36.8% were married-couple households, 19.2% were households with a male householder and no spouse or partner present, and 33.7% were households with a female householder and no spouse or partner present. About 33.0% of all households were made up of individuals and 20.7% had someone living alone who was 65 years of age or older.

There were 13,286 housing units, of which 11.0% were vacant. The homeowner vacancy rate was 2.8% and the rental vacancy rate was 7.0%.

Racial composition as of the 2020 census
Race	Number	Percent
White	21,248	79.5%
Black or African American	1,099	4.1%
American Indian and Alaska Native	128	0.5%
Asian	355	1.3%
Native Hawaiian and Other Pacific Islander	11	0.0%
Some other race	1,138	4.3%
Two or more races	2,734	10.2%
Hispanic or Latino (of any race)	4,111	15.4%

=== 2010 census ===
As of the census of 2010, there were 23,467 people, 10,727 total households, and 6,214 families residing in the CDP. The population density was 4,136 inhabitants per square mile (1,597/km^{2}). The racial makeup of the CDP was 92.3% White, 1.9% African American, 0.3% Native American, 1.2% Asian, 0.1% Pacific Islander, 1.9% from other races, and 2.3% from two or more races. Hispanic or Latino of any race were 9% of the population.

Of the 6,214 family households, 19.5% had children under the age of 18 living with them. 40.1% were married couples living together, 12.9% had a female householder with no husband present, 5% had a male householder with no wife present. Of the 10,727 total households, 42.1% were non-families. 35.1% of all households were made up of individuals, and 22.5% had someone living alone who was 65 years of age or older.

In the CDP, the population was spread out, with 18.4% under the age of 18. The median age was 48.9 years.
