= List of newspapers in Florida =

This is a list of newspapers in Florida.

== Daily and weekly newspapers (currently published) ==
Title	Locale	Year est.	Publisher/parent company	Notes
Alachua County Today	Alachua	2000		
Anna Maria Island Sun	Manatee	2000	Longboard Communications Inc.	
Apalachicola Times	Franklin	1885	Neves Media Publishing	
Apopka Chief, The	Apopka	1923	MARC Media	
Apopka Voice, The	Apopka	2015		
Arcadia Sun	Arcadia		Sun Coast Media Group	
Baker County Press, The	Baker	1929	Baker County Press, Inc.	
Banner, The	Lee	1957	USA Today Co.	
Beaches Hometown News, The	Brevard	2002	Hometown New LLC	
Boca Beacon	Boca Grande	1980	Hopkins & Daughter Inc	
Bradenton Herald	Bradenton	1922	McClatchy Company	
Bradenton Times	Bradenton	2008		
Bradford County Telegraph	Starke	1879		
Brevard Business News	Melbourne			
Business Observer	Sarasota		Observer Media Group	
Calhoun-Liberty Journal, The	Liberty	1981		
Cape Coral Breeze	Lee	1961	Breeze Newspapers	
Capital Outlook News	Tallahassee	1975	LIVE Communications	
Citrus County Chronicle	Citrus	1894	Paxton Media Group	
Clay Today	Clay	1950	Osteen Publishing Group	
Clearwater/Dunedin Beacon	Clearwater/Dunedin	1988	Tampa Bay Newspapers	
Clermont News Leader	Clermont	1982	D-R Media and Investments	
Costal Breeze News	Marco Island	2010		
Costal Star, The	Palm Beach	2008		
Collier Citizen	Collier	2006	USA Today Co.	
Creative Loafing Tampa	Tampa		Chava Communications	Alternative weekly tabloid; no current relation to Creative Loafing Atlanta
Crestview News Bulletin	Crestview	1975	Crestview News Bulletin	
Daily Commercial	Leesburg		USA Today Co.	
Daily Sun, The	Port Charlotte	1983	Adams MultiMedia	
The Daytona Times	Daytona Beach	1978		
Daytona Beach News-Journal	Daytona Beach		USA Today Co.	
Deland Hometown News	Deland	2013	Hometown News LLC	
Deltona Hometown News	Volusia	2013	Hometown News LLC	
Destin Log, The	Destin	1974	USA Today Co.	
East County Observer	Bradenton		Observer Media Group	
El Nuevo Herald	Miami	1987	McClatchy Company	
El Sentinel	Orlando		Tronc, Inc.	
El Sentinel del Sur de la Florida	Fort Lauderdale		Tronc, Inc.	
Englewood Sun	Englewood		Adams MultiMedia, Sun Coast Media Group	
Escambia Sun-Press	Escambia	1948		
Fernandina Beach News-Leader	Nassau	1854	Community Newspapers, Inc.	
Florida Keys Free Press	Monroe			
Jacksonville Daily Record	Jacksonville	1912	Observer Media Group	
Fernandina Beach News Leader	Fernandina Beach		Community Newspapers, Inc.	
Florida Observer	West Palm Beach	2021	National Press Networks	Florida's digital newspaper
Florida Keys Keynoter	Marathon		McClatchy Company	
Florida Sentinel Bulletin	Tampa			
Florida Star	Jacksonville	1951		Issues for 1956-1968, 2005-2019 https://thefloridastar.com available in the Florida Digital Newspaper Library
Florida Sun-Review	Orlando	1922		
Florida Times-Union	Jacksonville	1864	USA Today Co.	Began as Florida Union
Florida Today	Melbourne		USA Today Co.	
Floridian Newspaper	Miami	1927		Began as Jewish Floridian in 1927; became Floridian Newspaper in 1990
Folio Weekly	Jacksonville		As of 2020, Boldland Press	
Fort Myers Beach Observer	Fort Myers		Ogden Newspapers Inc.	
The Gadsden Times	Gadsden	1901	Gadsden County News Corp	
Gainesville Sun	Gainesville	1876	USA Today Co.	Began as Gainesville Times, renamed Gainesville Sun in 1879
The Graceville News	Graceville, Florida	1905		
Gulf Breeze News	Gulf Breeze	2001	C Corporation	
Herald Advocate, The	Wauchula	1955		
Hernando Sun	Brooksville	2015		
Highlands Today	Sebring			
Holley by the Sea News	Navarre (Holley by the Sea neighborhood)	2011	Sandpaper Publishing	Produced as a neighborhood specific newspaper, alongside the community-wide Navarre Press and also neighborhood specific Navarre Beach News.
Integrate News	Miami			
Jackson County Times	Marianna			
Jacksonville Business Journal	Jacksonville		American City Business Journals	
Jacksonville Daily Record	Jacksonville		Observer Media Group	
Jacksonville Free Press	Jacksonville			
Jax Air News	Jacksonville	19??		Issues for 1943-1975, 2005-2018 available in the Florida Digital Newspaper Library
Key West Citizen	Key West	1879	Adams MultiMedia	Scattered issues for 1908-1929, 1932-1949 available in the Florida Digital Newspaper Library
Knowhere Treasure Coast	St. Lucie County/Martin County/Indian River County	2019		
La Gaceta	Tampa	1922		
Lakeland Gazette	Lakeland	2019	Cloud 9 Entertainment Inc	
Lake City Reporter	Lake City		Community Newspapers, Inc.	
Le Courrier de Floride	Miami			
Le Soleil de la Floride	Hollywood	1983	Griffon Graphics	Catering to French-speaking visitors and residents of South Florida
The Ledger	Lakeland		USA Today Network	
Lehigh Acres Gazette	Lehigh Acres	2011	Cloud 9 Entertainment Inc	
Lehigh Acres Citizen			Ogden Newspapers Inc.	
Longboat Observer	Longboat		Observer Media Group	
Lush For Life	Tampa			
Madison County Carrier	Madison	1964	Greene Publishing, Inc.	
Madison Enterprise-Recorder	Madison	1854	Greene Publishing, Inc	
Mainstreet Daily News	Gainesville	2020	MARC Media	Started as digital site and expanded to weekly print in 2022
Miami Herald	Miami		McClatchy Company	
Miami New Times	Miami			
Miami Today	Miami			
Naples Daily News	Naples		USA Today Co.	
Nassau County Record	Callahan		Community Newspapers, Inc.	
Navarre Beach News	Navarre (Navarre Beach neighborhood)		Sandpaper Publishing	Neighborhood specific newspaper co-produced with the Navarre Press and Holley by the Sea News
Navarre Press	Navarre	2001	Sandpaper Publishing	Community-wide paper, co-produced with the neighborhood specific newspapers, Holley by the Sea News and Navarre Beach News.
New Times Broward-Palm Beach	Fort Lauderdale		Voice Media Group	
News Chief	Winter Haven		USA Today Co.	
News Herald	Panama City		USA Today Co.	
News-Press	Fort Myers		USA Today Co.	
News-Sun	Sebring			
Northwest Florida Daily News	Fort Walton Beach		USA Today Co.	
Orlando Business Journal	Orlando		American City Business Journals	
Orlando Sentinel	Orlando	1876	Tronc, Inc.	
Orlando Times	Orlando			
Orlando Weekly	Orlando	1990	Chava Communications	Alternative weekly tabloid; purchased in 2023, previous part of Euclid Media Group
Ormond Beach Observer	Ormond Beach		Observer Media Group	
Osceola News-Gazette	Kissimmee			
Palatka Daily News	Palatka		Community Newspapers, Inc.	
Palm Beach Daily News	Palm Beach		USA Today Co.	
Palm Beach Post	West Palm Beach		USA Today Co.	
Palm Coast Observer	Palm Coast		Observer Media Group	
Pelican Press	Sarasota			
Pensacola News Journal	Pensacola	1889	USA Today Co.	
Plant City Times & Observer	Plant City		Observer Media Group	
Polk News Sun	Polk	1926	D-R Media & Investments	
Ponte Vedra Recorder	Ponte Vedra	1969	OPC News LLC	
Port Orange Hometown News	Port Orange	2002	Hometown News LLC	
Port St. Lucie Hometown News	Port St. Lucie	2002	Hometown News LLC	
Polk County Democrat	Bartow			
Pompano Post	Pompano			
TCPalm	Vero Beach		USA Today Co.	
Riverbend News	Suwannee/Hamilton/Lafayette	2020	C & E Publishing, In	
Riverland News	Marion	1982	Paxton Media Group	
St. Augustine Record	St. Augustine	1894	USA Today Co.	
St. Lucie News Tribune	Port St. Lucie/St. Lucie County		USA Today Co.	
Sarasota Herald-Tribune	Sarasota		USA Today Co.	
Sarasota Observer	Sarasota	2004	Observer Media Group	
South Florida Times	Broward	1990	Beatty Media LLC	
South Santa Rosa News	Navarre	2015		
Siesta Key Observer	Sarasota	1971	Observer Media Group	formerly known as Pelican Press
Space Coast Daily	Brevard County			
Star-Banner	Ocala		USA Today Co.	
Stuart News	Stuart/Martin County		USA Today Co.	
Sumter Sun Times	Sumter	1881	D-R Media & Investments	
Sun-Sentinel	Fort Lauderdale		Tronc, Inc.	
Tallahassee Democrat	Tallahassee		USA Today Co.	
Tampa Bay Times	St. Petersburg	1884	Times Publishing Company	Titled St. Petersburg Times through 2011
tbt*	Tampa	2004	Times Publishing Company	Weekly tabloid produced by Tampa Bay Times
Treasure Coast Newspapers	Fort Pierce/Stuart	1913	USA Today Co.	
Triangle News Leader	Lake		D-R Media & Investments	
Union County Times	Union	1912	Bradford County Telegraph, Inc.	
Upper Keys Weekly	Islamorada	2006	The Weekly Newspapers	
Venice Gondolier Sun	Venice	1946	Adams MultiMedia, Sun Coast Media Group	
Vero Beach Hometown News	Indian River	2002	Hometown News LLC	
The Villages Daily Sun	The Villages	1997	The Villages Operating Company	
Voice of South Marion	Belleview	1969	Sandra M. Waldron	
Voz de la Calle	Hialeah			
Wakulla News, The	Wakulla	1897	Paxton Media Group	
Wakulla Sun, The	Wakulla	2022	Hot Water Publishing LLC	
Walton Sun, The	Okaloosa		USA Today Co.	
Washington County News	Washington	1893	Kent Smith Group, LLC	
The Westside Gazette	Fort Lauderdale	1971		
West Orange Times & Observer	Winter Garden	1904	Observer Media Group	
The West Volusia Beacon	DeLand	1992		
Windermere Sun	Windermere/Orange County	2014		
Winter Haven Sun, The	Polk	2016	D-R Media & Investments	
Yulee News, The	Nassau	2022		
Zephyrhills News	Zephyrhills			

== Student newspapers ==
- The Avion Newspaper (Embry-Riddle Aeronautical University)
- The Beacon (Florida International University)
- Central Florida Future (University of Central Florida)
- The Corsair (Pensacola State College)
- The Famuan (Florida A&M University)
- The Reporter (Miami Dade College)
- FSView & Florida Flambeau (Florida State University)
- The Galleon
- The Independent Florida Alligator (University of Florida)
- The Miami Hurricane (University of Miami in Coral Gables)
- The Oracle (University of South Florida)
- The Spinnaker (University of North Florida)
- The University Press (Florida Atlantic University)
- The Valencia Voice (Valencia College)
- The Voyager (University of West Florida)
- The Catalyst (New College of Florida)

== Defunct newspapers ==
Title	Locale	Year est.	Year ceased	Notes
Alachua Advocate, The	Gainsville	1881	1889	McCreary and White publisher
Boca Raton News	Boca Raton	1955	2009	
Clearwater Sun	Clearwater	1914	1989	
Clewiston News	Clewiston	1928	2018	Merged with 3 other newspapers to create Lake Okeechobee News, The
Colored Citizen	Pensacola	1914		
The Community Press	East Dunbar, Fort Myers	2015	2023	
Coral Gables Gazette	Coral Gables			
Evening Independent	St. Petersburg	1906	1986	Merged with the St. Petersburg Times
Florida Jewish News				
Floridian	Pensacola	1821		
Floridian	Tallahassee	1828		
Jacksonville Journal	Jacksonville	1887	1988	Merged with the Florida Times-Union
Jasper News, The	Jasper	1970	2020	Defunct because of COVID-19
Mayo Free Press, The		1888	2020	Defunct because of COVID-19
Miami News			1988	
Miami SunPost	Miami	1985	2014	
Pasco News				
Sarasota Journal		1952	1982	
Sarasota Times	Sarasota			
La Semana	Orlando	1981		
Sol de Hialeah	Hialeah	1969	Ceased?	Spanish-language
South Florida Blade				
Suwannee Democrat	Suwannee	1884	2020	Defunct because of COVID-19
Tampa Times	Tampa		1982	Merged with the Tampa Tribune
Tampa Tribune	Tampa		2016	Merged with the Tampa Bay Times
The Florida Agriculturalist	Deland	1878	1911	
Tropical Sun				
Winter Park Advocate				

== See also ==
- Florida media
  - List of radio stations in Florida
  - List of television stations in Florida
  - Media of cities in Florida: Fort Lauderdale, Gainesville, Jacksonville, Key West, Lakeland, Miami, Orlando, St. Petersburg, Tallahassee, Tampa, Windermere
- List of French-language newspapers published in the United States (includes some Florida titles)
- List of Spanish-language newspapers published in the United States (includes some Florida titles)
- Journalism:
  - Category:Journalists from Florida
  - Journalism schools:
    - Florida A&M University School of Journalism & Graphic Communication (est. 1982), in Tallahassee
    - Florida International University School of Journalism and Mass Communication, in North Miami
    - University of Florida College of Journalism and Communications in Gainesville
    - University of Miami School of Communication
- Florida literature
U.S. newspapers

Comprehensive

- Lists of newspapers
- List of newspapers in the United States

Frequency

- List of free daily newspapers in the United States
- List of weekly newspapers in the United States

Circulation

- List of international newspapers originating in the United States
- List of national newspapers in the United States
- List of newspapers in the United States by circulation

Foreign language

- List of French-language newspapers published in the United States
- List of German-language newspapers published in the United States
- List of Spanish-language newspapers published in the United States

Specialty

- List of African-American newspapers in the United States
- List of alternative weekly newspapers in the United States
- List of business newspapers in the United States
- List of family-owned newspapers in the United States
- List of Jewish newspapers in the United States
- List of LGBTQ periodicals in the United States
- List of student newspapers in the United States
- List of supermarket tabloids in the United States
- List of underground press in the United States

Other

- List of defunct newspapers of the United States

== Bibliography ==
- S. N. D. North; United States Department of the Interior (1884). "Catalogue of Periodical Publications: Florida". History and Present Condition of the Newspaper and Periodical Press of the United States. Washington, D.C.: Government Printing Office. p. 214. OCLC 1850475.
- James T. Haley, ed. (1895), "Newspapers: Florida", Afro-American Encyclopaedia, Mind and matter, Nashville: Haley & Florida, hdl:2027/inu.30000029292855, OCLC 219597043
- "Florida". American Newspaper Directory. New York: George P. Rowell. 1900. hdl:2027/umn.31951002273861a.
- "Florida". American Newspaper Annual & Directory. Philadelphia: N. W. Ayer & Son. 1922. pp. 149+. hdl:2027/umn.31951001295695n – via HathiTrust.
- James Owen Knauss (1926). Territorial Florida Journalism. Florida State Historical Society – via Internet Archive.
  - Chapter about Newspapers
  - Chronological List of Florida Newspapers Published before July 1845
- Elmer J. Emig (1932). "Check-List of Extant Florida Newspapers, 1845-1876". Florida Historical Quarterly. 11 (2): 77–87. JSTOR 30150139.
- Federal Writers' Project (1939), "Newspapers and Radio", Florida; a Guide to the Southernmost State, American Guide Series, pp. 120–127, ISBN 9781623760090 – via Google Books
- Horance G. Davis Jr. (1959). "Pensacola Newspapers, 1821-1900". Florida Historical Quarterly. 37 (3/4): 418–445. JSTOR 30166297.
- Gonzalo R. Soruco (1996). Cubans and the Mass Media in South Florida. University Press of Florida. ISBN 978-0-8130-1379-4.
- Julian M. Pleasants (2003). Orange Journalism: Voices from Florida Newspapers. University Press of Florida. ISBN 978-0-8130-2653-4.
