= Mass media in the Tampa Bay area =

The Tampa Bay media market is Florida's second-largest metropolitan area with a variety of print, online and broadcast media outlets serving the region. The U.S. Census Bureau estimates the population for the Tampa–St. Petersburg Metropolitan Statistical Area (MSA) at 3,194,831 according to the 2019 est. The Tampa Bay media market also includes Citrus, Manatee, Sarasota and Polk counties which is over 5,000,000 when combined with the Tampa Bay (MSA). Polk County is also served by media from Orlando.

== Newspapers and magazines ==
The first newspaper in Tampa was the Florida Peninsular.

The major daily newspaper serving the area is the Tampa Bay Times. The Tampa Bay Times, which was known as the St. Petersburg Times from 1898 until January 2012, is the largest newspaper by circulation in the southeastern United States at over 400,000, which is over 50% more than Florida's next largest newspaper, the Orlando Sentinel. It distributes a free Monday-through-Friday tabloid called tbt* in most areas of Hillsborough, Pinellas, and Pasco counties.

The Tampa Tribune was Tampa's longest-running newspaper, first published in 1895. The Tribune was one of several local daily newspapers serving Tampa in the early 20th century, but after buying the Tampa Times in 1958, it became Tampa's main morning daily for the next several decades. (The Tribune published the Tampa Times as an afternoon daily until 1982.) In more recent years, "The Trib" published a portfolio of standalone weekly newspapers throughout the region, many of which are still published by the Tampa Bay Times, including the Plant City Courier & Tribune, Brandon News & Tribune, South Shore News & Tribune, Northeast News & Tribune, Carrollwood News & Tribune, South Tampa News & Tribune, Northwest News & Tribune, Central Tampa News & Tribune, The Suncoast News, and the Spanish language CENTRO Tampa. Stiff competition with the St. Petersburg / Tampa Bay Times for subscribers and advertising revenue led to several changes of ownership and rounds of layoffs for the Tampa Tribune during the 2000s, and in May 2016, the Tampa Bay Times bought and folded its main competitor. The Times added some of the Tribune's reporters and columnists to its staff while laying off others as it consolidated operations.

The Tampa Bay area is also served by a variety of regional newspapers and weeklies. La Gaceta is a weekly trilingual (English, Spanish and Italian) newspaper published in Tampa's historic Ybor City since 1922. Two newspapers serve the local black community: the Florida Sentinel Bulletin (Tampa) and The Weekly Challenger (St. Petersburg). Creative Loafing Tampa (also known for a time as the Weekly Planet) is the area's primary alternative weekly. The Oracle serves the University of South Florida and its surrounding community. The Tampa Bay Business Journal is the region's business publication of record. The Osprey Observer is a weekly that serves East Hillsborough County with five separate publications, three of which carry the Osprey Observer moniker and a fourth, The Christian Voice that is distributed through local churches. Some lesser-known papers include Tampa Bay Newspapers TBNWeekly and the Tampa Bay Informer.

In addition to regional outlets based in Tampa, St. Pete Rising and St. Pete Catalyst are digital news publications that focus specifically on St. Petersburg and the greater Pinellas County area.

Several print magazines serve the Tampa Bay area. Tampa Bay Magazine, established in 1986, is printed monthly and features dining and entertainment content. Tampa Bay Parenting Magazine was established in 2007, and it features content for and about local families.

Several cities outside the Tampa–St. Petersburg core but within the Tampa Bay media market have smaller-circulation daily newspapers with overlapping coverage and distribution areas. They include The Bradenton Herald, Sarasota Herald-Tribune, The Ledger of Lakeland, The News-Chief of Winter Haven (published by The Ledger), the Citrus County Chronicle (based in Inverness), and previously Hernando Today (based in Brooksville) as well as Highlands Today (based in Sebring). Both of the Today newspapers were published by The Tampa Tribune. Hernando Today was shuttered by the Tribune in 2014; Highlands Today was briefly continued by the Times before being sold and merged into the Highlands News Sun.

== Television ==
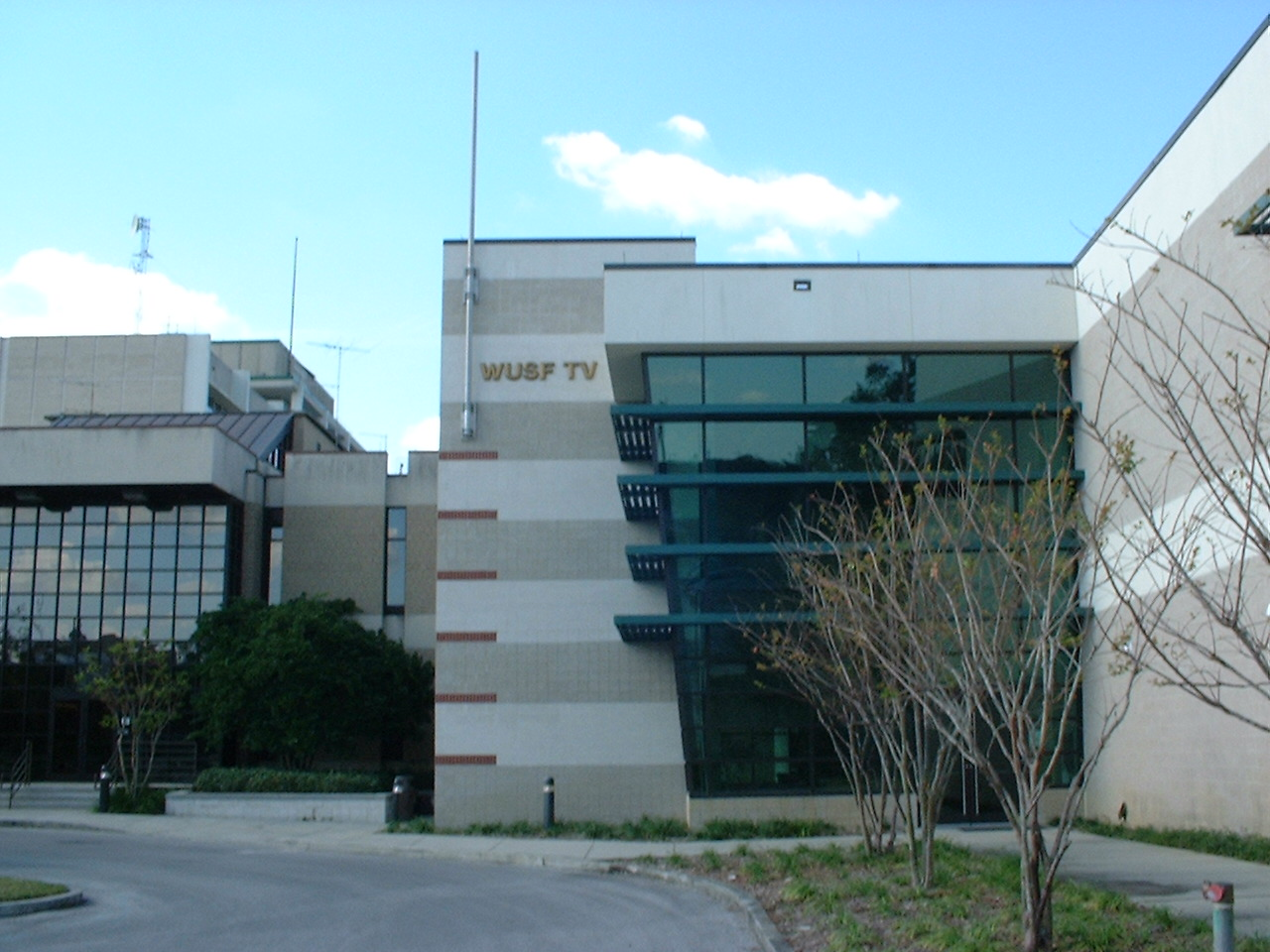
WUSF-TV studios in Tampa

The Tampa Bay area is the nation's 11th-largest TV market and largest TV Market(DMA) in the state of Florida, according to Nielsen Media Research, with 1,859,820 TV households.

Two asterisks (**) denote a network owned-and-operated station.

=== Full-power ===
- 3 WEDU Tampa (PBS)
- 3.4 WEDQ Tampa (PBS)
- 8 WFLA-TV Tampa (NBC)
- 10 WTSP St. Petersburg (CBS)
- 13 WTVT Tampa (Fox)**
- 22 WCLF Clearwater (CTN)**
- 28 WFTS-TV Tampa (ABC)
- 32 WMOR-TV Lakeland (Independent)
- 38 WTTA St. Petersburg (The CW)**
- 40 WWSB Sarasota (ABC)
- 44 WTOG St. Petersburg (Independent)
- 50 WVEA-TV Tampa (Univision, UniMás on 50.6)**
- 62 WFTT-TV Venice (Scientology Network)
- 66 WXPX-TV Bradenton (Independent, Ion Television on 66.2)

=== Low-power ===
- 39 WSNN-LD Sarasota (Independent with MyNetworkTV)
- 49 WRMD-CD Tampa (Telemundo)**

=== Cable ===
- Bay News 9
- Spectrum Sports Florida

== Radio ==
The Tampa Bay area is the nation's 19th largest radio market, according to Arbitron Research. More than 70 radio stations exist, split almost evenly between the AM and FM band. Most major programming formats are represented by the corporations of iHeartMedia, the biggest owner of radio stations in the area, followed by Cox Media Group and Beasley Broadcasting. The area is also home to at least two non-profit radio stations, WMNF and WUSF. Christian stations include The Joy FM and WBVM. In addition, many Orlando-area stations can be heard in the northern and eastern reaches of the metropolitan area.

These stations were rated by Arbitron in January 2014:

- WXTB (98 Rock) Active Rock
- WWRM (Magic 94.9) Adult Contemporary
- WMTX (Mix 100.7) Adult Contemporary
- WDAE All Sports
- WJBR All Sports
- WKVZ (98.7 K-Love) Contemporary Christian
- WSUN (97X) Alternative
- WXGL (107.3 The Eagle) Classic Hits
- WRBQ-FM (Q105) Classic Hits
- WSMR Classical
- WCIE Contemporary Christian
- WBVM Contemporary Christian
- WJIS Contemporary Christian
- WFUS (US 103.5) Country
- WQYK (99.5 QYK) Country
- WUSF Public Radio
- WFLA News Talk Information
- WHNZ News Talk Information
- WFLZ (93.3 FLZ) Pop Contemporary Hit Radio
- WTBV (101.5 The Vibe) Urban Adult Contemporary
- WKES Religious
- WLLD (WILD 94.1) Rhythmic Contemporary Hit Radio
- WDUV (105.5 The Dove) Soft Adult Contemporary
- WYUU (Maxima 92.5) Spanish Hot Adult Contemporary
- WHPT Talk/Personality
- WBTP Classic Hip Hop
- WMNF (WMNF 88.5 FM) Community/Variety
- WDAE-FM Sports

== See also ==
- Florida media
  - List of newspapers in Florida
  - List of radio stations in Florida
  - List of television stations in Florida
  - Media of cities in Florida: Fort Lauderdale, Gainesville, Jacksonville, Key West, Lakeland, Miami, Orlando, St. Petersburg, Tallahassee
