= Louise Kelley Frisbie =

American historian

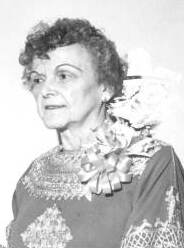
- Frisbie in 1977
- Born: Mildred Louise Kelley; October 19, 1913; Jacksonville, Duval County, Florida, United States
- Died: July 23, 1989 (aged 75); Lakeland, Polk County, Florida, United States
- Occupations: Author; historian; journalist
- Spouse: S. Loyal Frisbie (m. 1937)

Mildred Louise Kelley Frisbie (October 18, 1913 – July 23, 1989) was a newspaper columnist, author, historian and educator. She was born in Jacksonville, Florida in 1913 and moved to Bartow, Florida in 1935 after graduating from Florida Southern College. She worked at Summerlin Institute (now Bartow High School) for three years before joining the Polk County Democrat, where her husband worked.

She wrote a series of articles on Fort Meade a column titled "Pioneers". Following up on the popular column she wrote three books: Peace River Pioneers, Yesterday's Polk County and Florida's Fabled Inns.

Governor Reubin Askew appointed her to the Polk County Historical Commission in 1972, and she continued there for 16 years. She was a founding member of the Polk County Historical Association and was the group's first editor. She was honored by the Florida Senate for her work in preserving local history in 1976. Frisbie died in 1989. She was designated a Great Floridian in 2000 and a plaque honoring her is located at the Polk County Democrat building at 190 South Florida Avenue in Bartow.

Florida Memory hosts the Louise Frisbie Collection as part of the larger Florida Photographic Collection. The collection contains over 900 photographs of the Polk County area gathered by Frisbie, spanning 1910 to 1950.
