= WUSF =

WUSF may refer to:

- WUSF (FM), a radio station (89.7 FM) licensed to Tampa, Florida, United States and owned by the University of Florida
- WEDQ, a television station (channel 16 analog/34 digital) licensed to Tampa, Florida, United States, which held the call sign WUSF-TV from 1966 to 2017
