= WGCU =

WGCU may refer to:

- WGCU (TV), a television station (channel 22, virtual 30) licensed to Fort Myers, Florida, United States
- WGCU-FM, a radio station (90.1 FM) licensed to Fort Myers, Florida, United States
