= Boca Beacon =

American newspaper based in Boca Grande

- Type: Weekly newspaper
- Format: Broadsheet
- Owner(s): Hopkins & Daughter Publishing
- Publisher: Dusty Hopkins
- Editor: Garland Pollard
- Founded: 1980
- Headquarters: 431 Park Avenue Boca Grande, FL 33921
- Circulation: 4,000
- Website: bocabeacon.com

The Boca Beacon is an American newspaper based in Boca Grande, Florida. The paper was founded in 1980 by Marnie Banks, but currently the newspaper is owned by Hopkins & Daughter Publishing. The newspaper's headquarters are at 431 Park Avenue Boca Grande, FL 33921.

== History ==
The newspaper was founded by Marnie Banks, with some help from Jack Harper, in 1980. It was first published from the old Kuhl house on Palm Avenue and printed in Clearwater. Afterwards, in May 1980 Banks's parents aided her to buy Jack Harper out. Banks then extended the newspaper's reach to the surrounding barrier islands, Placida and Cape Haze. At that time there were about 1,150 people subscribed to the newspaper.

As time went on Banks wanted the Boca Beacon to become a weekly paper. However, she knew that it would take too much work and had realized that there were other goals that she wanted to pursue and decided to find a new owner for the newspaper.

On July 27, 1988, the ownership of the newspaper transitioned to Dusty Hopkins and Terry Hopkins. Terry Hopkins had extensive experience in newspaper business and had just left Fort Myers News Press that same year. In addition, both Terry and Dusty Hopkins had worked for newspapers in August, Portland and Waterville, Maine as well as in New York at The Ithaca Journal, in Washington D.C. and Connecticut. They both moved to the Gasparilla Island shortly before they purchased the paper. Afterwards, they purchased the Gulfcoast Press and printed the newspaper in the Naples. Currently, the Boca Beacon is printed at the Venice Gondolier newspaper.

== Coverage ==
The newspaper is in circulation to the surrounding barrier islands, Placida and Cape Haze. The online website's news section of the Boca Beacon is divided into 7 sections: Spotlight, Featured News, Breaking News, Editorial, Obituaries, Letter to Editor and Commentary.

=== Fishing Center ===
On the online website of the Boca Beacon there is a section that's dedicated to the Tide Table for Boca Grande, FL Station ID 8725520 as well as it provides fishing reports.

=== Boca Grande's Community Calendar ===
This section of their website provides information on the various events in Boca Grande.

== See also ==
- List of newspapers in the United States
- List of Florida newspapers
