= The Polk County Democrat =

Newspaper in Bartow, Florida

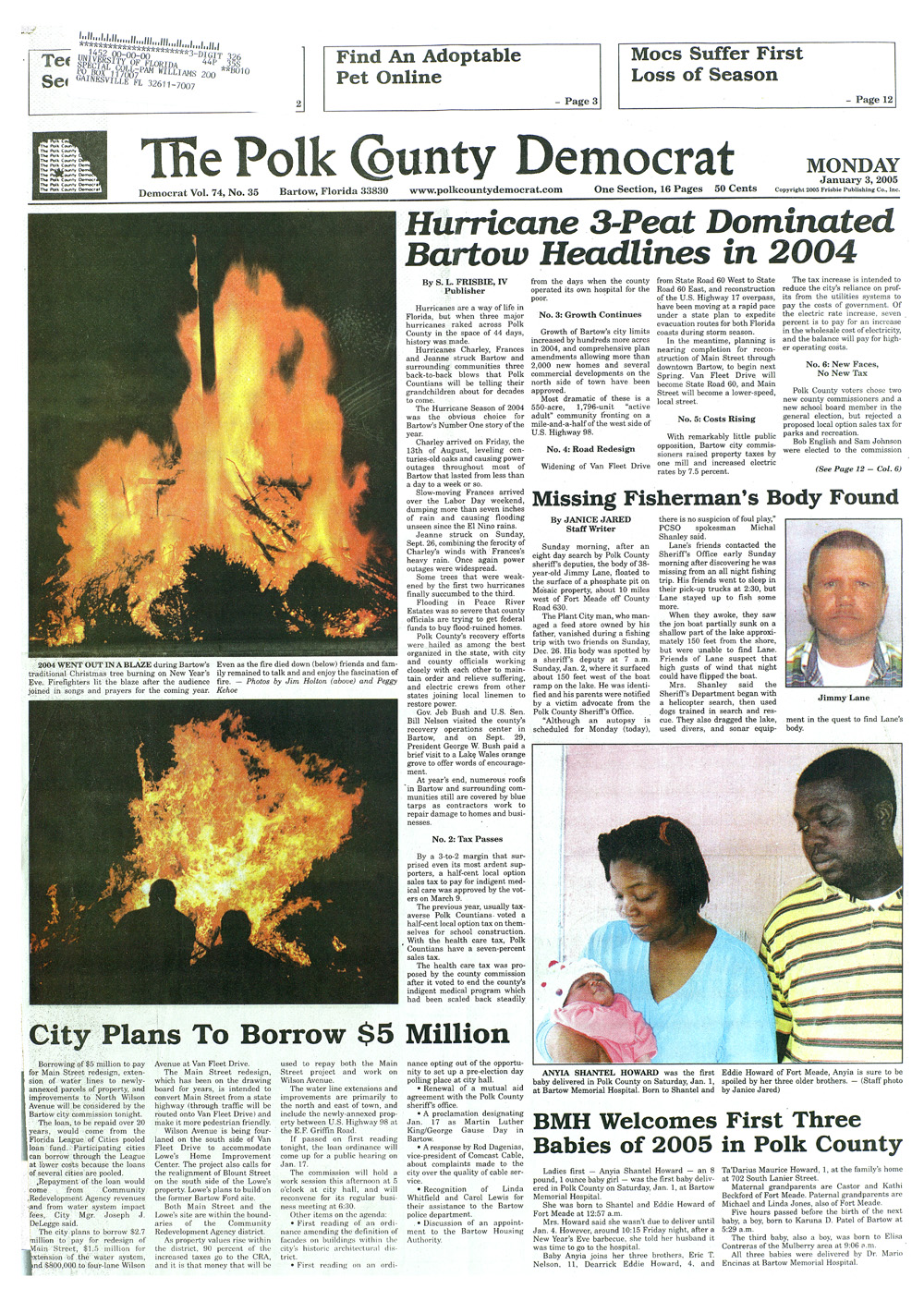
- The January 3, 2005 front page of The Polk County Democrat
- Type: Semi-weekly paper
- Owner: Sun Coast Media Group
- Founded: 1931
- City: Bartow, Florida
- OCLC number: 33886838
- Website: polkcountydemocrat.com

The Polk County Democrat was a newspaper published in Bartow, Polk County, Florida, United States. It was a semi-weekly paper which began publication in 1931 and is the only newspaper published within Bartow. The Democrat was run by members of the Frisbie family for 75 years.

The paper was sold to the Sun Coast Media Group in 2006, along with several other papers owned by the Frisbie family, namely the Lake Wales News and Fort Meade Leader. The paper was subsequently renamed the Polk News-Sun.

== Frisbie family ==
Louise Kelley Frisbie worked at the paper with her husband for over 40 years, and was a columnist for the Democrat and the Fort Meade Leader from 1970 until her death in 1989.

S.L. Frisbie IV led the newspaper for over 45 years, representing the fourth generation of his family to head the publication. As a sophomore at Florida State University, he was employed as an entry-level reporter for the Tallahassee Democrat. Going back to Bartow and joining the Polk County Democrat in 1964, he wrote a weekly column through his retirement in 2009. Frisbie was elected as president of the Florida Press Association in 1976, and inducted into the Florida Press Association Hall of Fame in 2013. His father, Loyal Frisbie, was also previously elected as president of the Florida Press Association, and inducted into the Hall of Fame in 1989.

== Building ==
190 South Florida Avenue in Bartow was originally constructed in 1920. Before the Democrat occupied the building in 1964, having purchased the building five years previously, it served as a livery stable, garage, car dealership, and furniture store.

When Louise Kelley Frisbie was designated a Great Floridian in 2000, a plaque honoring her was established at the Polk County Democrat building.

During 2019, the building was converted to a brewery, opening in March of 2020 as the Front Page Brewing Company to preserve the building's history.

== Political endorsements ==
The paper endorsed Katherine Harris, a graduate of Bartow High School, in her 2006 campaign for U.S. Senate.

The paper also endorsed John McCain in the 2008 Republican Party presidential primaries.

== See also ==
- The Ledger – Lakeland
- News Chief – Winter Haven
- Highlands Today – Sebring
- Plant City Observer – Plant City
