= William Cash (disambiguation) =

Bill Cash (born 1940) is a British Conservative politician and a prominent Eurosceptic in the House of Commons.

William or Bill Cash may also refer to:

- William Cash (author and journalist) (born 1966), son of Bill Cash
- William Wilson Cash (1880–1955), Anglican bishop
- William Thomas Cash (1878–1951), American educator, author and politician
- Bill Cash (baseball) (1919–2011), baseball player in the Negro leagues
- William Cash (accountant) (1891–1964), English accountant and business director
