= WGCU-FM =

- Fort Myers, Florida; United States
- Broadcast area: Southwest Florida
- Frequency: 90.1 MHz (HD Radio)
- Branding: WGCU

Programming
- Format: Public Radio - News - Talk
- Subchannels: HD2: Classical 24
- Affiliations: National Public Radio; Public Radio Exchange; American Public Media; BBC World Service

Ownership
- Owner: Florida Gulf Coast University
- Sister stations: WGCU-TV

History
- First air date: September 12, 1983
- Former call signs: WSFP-FM (1983–1996)
- Call sign meaning: Florida Gulf Coast University

Technical information
- Licensing authority: FCC
- Facility ID: 69042
- Class: C1
- ERP: 100,000 watts
- HAAT: 248 meters (814 ft)
- Transmitter coordinates: 26°48′55.2″N 81°45′42.5″W
- Repeater: 91.7 WMKO (Marco Island)

Links
- Public license information: Public file; LMS
- Webcast: Listen Live; Listen Live (HD2)
- Website: wgcu.org

WGCU-FM (90.1 FM) is an National Public Radio-member station on Florida's Gulf Coast. Licensed to Fort Myers, it is owned by Florida Gulf Coast University with studios along FGCU Boulevard, on campus. WGCU also operates WMKO 91.7, a full-time simulcast station licensed to Marco Island to serve the Naples area.

WGCU-FM is a Class C1 station. It has an effective radiated power (ERP) of 100,000 watts, the maximum for most FM stations. The transmitter is on Babcock Ranch Road in Punta Gorda, within the Fred C. Babcock/Cecil M. Webb Wildlife Management Area. WMKO is a Class A station with an ERP of 1,700 watts. Its transmitter is on Tower Road at Collier Boulevard in Naples.

== Programming ==
WGCU-FM has an all-news and information format on weekdays. Programs from NPR and other public radio networks include Morning Edition, All Things Considered, Fresh Air, 1A, Here and Now and Marketplace. WGCU-FM produces its own half-hour program on weekdays, with local news and interviews. Gulf Coast Life, hosted by Mike Kiniry, is broadcast at 2 p.m. and is repeated at 7 p.m. The BBC World Service airs all night.

On weekends, WGCU-FM features specialty programs. They include Bullseye, The Moth Radio Hour, This American Life, Radiolab, Milk Street Radio, To the Best of Our Knowledge, Travel with Rick Steves, The Splendid Table, On The Media, Science Friday, Latino USA, Reveal, Snap Judgment, Code Switch, Living on Earth and Wait, Wait, Don't Tell Me. One music program is heard on Saturday and Sunday evenings, World Cafe from WXPN Philadelphia. And on its HD2 subchannel, WGCU-FM carries classical music from Classical 24, a network from American Public Media.

== History ==
FM 90.1 signed on the air on September 12, 1983. Its original call sign was WSFP-FM. The radio station was built alongside PBS network affiliate WSFP-TV Channel 30. The two stations were owned by the University of South Florida in Tampa, which also owns Tampa Bay NPR station WUSF-FM and previously owned WUSF-TV (now WEDQ). At the time, Fort Myers - Naples was the only media market in Florida without any public broadcasting stations of its own. WSFP-FM was largely a rebroadcast of WUSF-FM and WSFP-TV had virtually the same schedule as WUSF-TV.

In 1992, plans to establish Florida Gulf Coast University began. The broadcast licenses for the FM and TV stations were transferred to the FGCU in 1996. WSFP-FM and WSFP-TV changed their call letters to WGCU-FM and WGCU (TV) on June 13, 1997, just weeks before students would arrive. The school commemorates August 25, 1997, as the first time classes were held on campus. Now owned by FGCU, the two stations began airing their own schedule of programs.

Despite operating at a full 100,000 watts, the WGCU-FM signal is hard to receive in parts of Collier County. This is because its transmitter is located in southern Charlotte County. However, its grade B signal reaches much of northern Collier County, including much of Naples itself. Soon after FGCU opened, it requested funding for a second station to improve its coverage in Naples. WMKO signed on for the first time in 1999, filling in coverage gaps in southern Collier County.

WGCU has also been referenced for hurricane information on electronic highway signs across Southwest Florida. The signs advised drivers to tune to 90.1 WGCU-FM for weather information.

== HD Radio ==
For its first 13 years as a locally focused station, WGCU-FM aired a mix of NPR news programs and classical music. In 2009, WGCU moved its classical music programming to its HD Radio digital subchannel.

Then in 2012, when Classical South Florida affiliate 88.7 WNPS signed on in the market, WGCU-FM's HD subchannel changed. It became xPonential Radio, an Adult Album Alternative (Triple-A) format produced by WXPN in Philadelphia. In 2015, 88.7 WNPS ended its classical format and switched to Christian Contemporary music as WDLV. At that point, WGCU-FM added an HD3 subchannel with classical music programming to fill the gap left by the end of WNPS.

As of June 25, 2018, the xPonential Radio service ended. The Classical 24 network moved from WGCU-FM-HD3 to HD2.

In June 2025 Beacon, a project put together by the Florida Department of Emergency Management, Futuri, and Florida Public Media was added to HD-3. The service is primarily emergency alerts and public warnings powered by AI voices. The service was discontinued in March 2026.

== See also ==
- WGCU Television
