= Allen Morris (historian) =

American historian

Allen Covington Morris
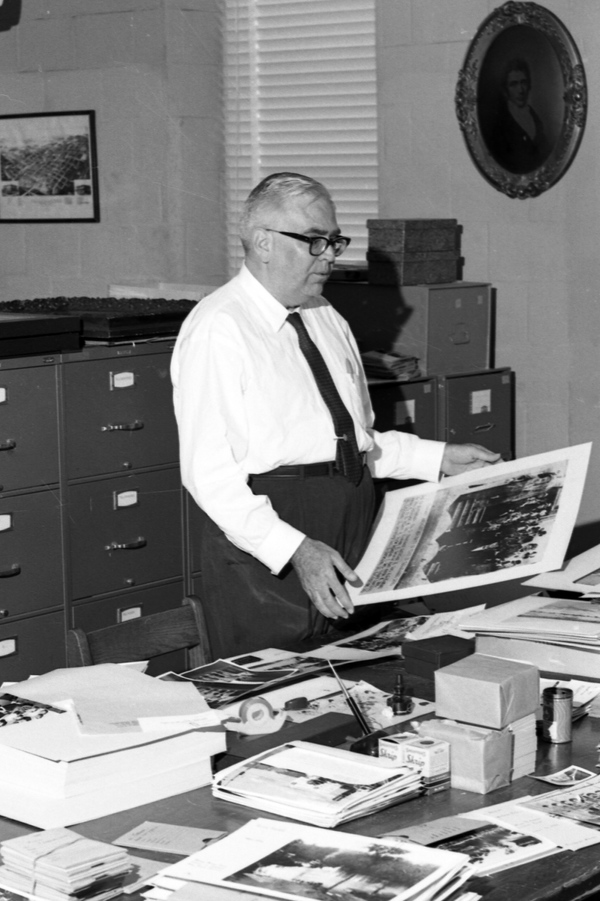
- Morris in 1965
- Born: December 3, 1909; Chicago, Illinois
- Died: April 22, 2002 (aged 92); Tallahassee, Florida
- Occupations: Journalist, Historian, and Author
- Known for: Establishing the Florida Photographic Collection; writing books on Florida history; Historian of the Florida Legislature

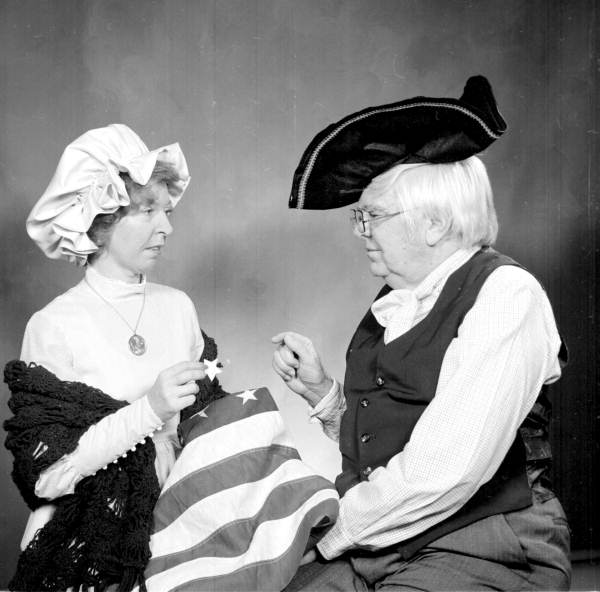
Allen Morris with his wife Joan in Revolutionary costume

Allen Covington Morris (December 3, 1909 – April 22, 2002), a distinguished historian and writer, was Clerk of the Florida House of Representatives and Historian of the Florida Legislature. Starting in 1947, he wrote The Florida Handbook then updated it annually and in 1974 wrote Florida Place Names as well as subsequent revisions. He also wrote other books on Florida history and government. In 1952, Morris established the Florida Photographic Collection, now part of the Florida State Archives.

== Awards ==
- February 23, 1972, was proclaimed by the Florida Legislature to be "Allen Morris Day".
- The main House committee auditorium, which is the largest committee room in the House Office Building, was renamed "Morris Hall" in 1977.
- The Florida Bicentennial Commission named him as a "Florida Patriot".
