= William Kosciusko Zewadski =

American legislator

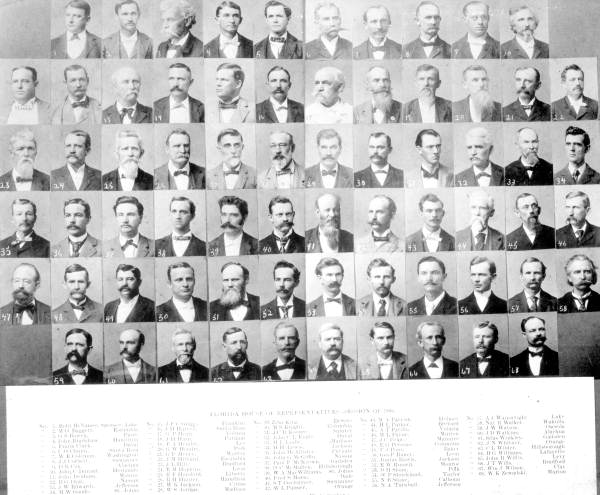
William Zewadski (bottom right) and other 1899 members of the Florida House of Representatives

William Kosciusko Zewadski (July 3, 1860 – April 27, 1929) was a state legislator in Florida from 1896 to 1902. The Florida Archives has a composite photograph that includes an image of him as well as other legislative and judicial leaders in Florida. His son and grandson were given the same name.

His father was a nobleman of Poland who sought refuge in the U.S. after the area he lived in was taken over by the Kingdom of Prussia. William was born in Jacksonville and later lived in Ocala. He married Amanda Harriet Barco and had four sons, three of whom became attorneys. He moved to Tampa, Florida in 1888 and worked in legal and civil affairs as an attorney.

In 1896 he was elected to the Florida House of Representatives. He was re-elected in 1898 and 1900.

He died suddenly April 27, 1929 in Tampa, and was buried locally in the family cemetery. He was survived by four sons William Kosciusko Zewadski Jr., Guy Zewadski, C. B. Zewadski and Olaf Zewadski.
