= WEDU =

Television station in Tampa, Florida

- Tampa–St. Petersburg, Florida; United States
- City: Tampa, Florida
- Channels: Digital: 13 (VHF), shared with WEDQ; Virtual: 3
- Branding: WEDU PBS

Programming
- Affiliations: 3.1: PBS; 3.2: World Channel; 3.3: NHK World-Japan

Ownership
- Owner: Florida West Coast Public Broadcasting, Inc.
- Sister stations: WEDQ

History
- First air date: October 27, 1958
- Former channel numbers: Analog: 3 (VHF, 1958–2009); Digital: 54 (UHF, until 2009)
- Former affiliations: NET (1958–1970)
- Call sign meaning: Education

Technical information
- Licensing authority: FCC
- Facility ID: 21808
- ERP: 25 kW; 38 kW (CP)
- HAAT: 470.9 m (1,545 ft); 471.9 m (1,548 ft) (CP)
- Transmitter coordinates: 27°50′51.5″N 82°15′49.4″W

Links
- Public license information: Public file; LMS
- Website: www.wedu.org

WEDU (channel 3) is a PBS member television station licensed to Tampa, Florida, United States, serving the Tampa Bay area. It is owned by Florida West Coast Public Broadcasting alongside WEDQ (channel 3.4). The two stations share studios at the Berkman Family Broadcast Center on North Boulevard in Tampa and transmitter facilities in Riverview, Florida.

WEDU began broadcasting on October 27, 1958, as a service to regional schools. During the day, it aired local and national educational programs for telecast in schools, while programs for adults from National Educational Television were telecast in the evenings. The station flourished over the course of the 1960s as schools' use of its programming grew rapidly; in the early 1970s, it suffered as some of that support was reduced. In early 1980, WEDU moved to its present, purpose-built facility on North Boulevard, abandoning its original studios, a surplus United States Navy power plant in dilapidated condition.

In 1984, WEDU proposed to switch channels with WTOG-TV (channel 44), a commercial independent station. The proposed deal with WTOG-TV's owner, Hubbard Broadcasting, would have moved WEDU to channel 44 and given it nearly $50 million in cash and incentives; Hubbard sought channel 3 for WTOG-TV so it could shed the stigma of being a UHF station and achieve parity with the region's three VHF network affiliates. The deal sparked a sharp local and national reaction as other commercial and public broadcasters decried the proposal. It was eventually barred by a clause inserted into the Federal Communications Commission budget by Congress. WEDU and Hubbard ultimately reached an understanding that moved channel 3's transmitter to WTOG-TV's tower, replacing its outdated, failing facility.

In the 1990s, WEDU grew its stature in national programming production but failed to find promised revenue in the sector; the ten-year management tenure of Steve Rogers ended with layoffs of nearly a third of the station's staff amid a downturn in viewer contributions. Dick Lobo, a retired broadcast executive, came out of retirement to run the station and succeeded in improving its corporate underwriting and financial reputation. In 2017, WEDU absorbed the license and programming that had been associated with competing public station WUSF-TV, owned by the University of South Florida, when the university sold its spectrum. WEDU produces local public affairs and cultural programming focused on the Tampa Bay area.

== History ==
=== Early years ===
The Federal Communications Commission (FCC) allocated channel 3 to Tampa, Florida, for educational broadcasting in 1952. As early as the following year, regional education leaders from five area counties—Hillsborough, Manatee, Pinellas, Polk, and Sarasota—came together to incorporate the Florida West Coast Educational Television Corporation. State legislators representing the area refused to back the plan, finding it variously premature and expensive.

The organization was reformed in 1955. By 1956, pressure from groups who sought channel 3 for commercial use was spurring action. In March, a meeting was held by Tampa mayor Curtis Hixon, at which Tampa radio station WTSP—owned by the St. Petersburg Times newspaper—reiterated its offer of a tower site if necessary. As planning began in earnest in Tampa, Gene Dyer, permittee of the unbuilt UHF station WTVI at Fort Pierce, Florida, proposed to have channel 3 moved there for his use. This heightened the urgency to convey to the FCC that there was interest in keeping channel 3 as an educational channel in Tampa. A steering committee was formed to spearhead a fundraising drive, and plans were more definite by January 1957, with leadership chosen and contributions from Tampa's two existing commercial stations, WFLA-TV (channel 8) and WTVT (channel 13).

A second group took an interest in using channel 3 for commercial use. WSUN-TV (channel 38) in St. Petersburg offered to swap channel 38 for channel 3, seeking parity with its commercial competitors and claiming that Florida West Coast Educational Television could get on the air earlier from the existing channel 38. The offer was rebuffed, but the two groups were now racing to see who would file first at the FCC.

Florida West Coast Educational Television applied on April 5, 1957, for channel 3. In expectation of getting the construction permit, the station began organizing program proposals and contacting regional school superintendents to solicit ideas for educational telecasts. The permit was granted by the FCC on September 19, 1957, and Florida West Coast Educational Television announced that their station would have studios in St. Petersburg and Tampa and would begin fundraising drives in both areas. Briefly called WFCE in the local press, it was WEDU by November, when planning began for station programming. For its Tampa studios, WEDU moved into a former Navy power plant on 20th Street, on land that had been deeded to the Hillsborough County school board. The facility had high enough ceilings to accommodate a television studio with little conversion. To help raise funds, a dinner was held, featuring Governor LeRoy Collins among its guests. In August, courses and teachers were announced, with contributions from multiple counties in the channel 3 coverage area. On weekends, WTVT trained staff members in television production.

WEDU made its first broadcast on October 27, 1958. The first program featured Ceil Hedman of St. Petersburg teaching third-grade reading. She was followed by teachers with courses on high school American history, Spanish, and science, as well as after-school programs for adult audiences—then comparatively rare on educational stations that were mostly devoted to classroom instruction. In addition to local educational shows, the station aired programs from National Educational Television (NET) and educational series produced by NBC.

Shortly after, at the start of 1959, the second studio at St. Petersburg Junior College opened; with both studios in operation, the station would be on the air 10 hours a day during the week. Over the course of the year, the station won a major Ford Foundation grant to support its teaching programs, obtained its first video tape recorder, and boosted its power to improve coverage and reception. The audience for its educational programming steadily grew to 75,000 students by 1960, 120,000 by 1962, and 151,000 by 1963; the Tampa facilities were expanded to include a second studio. Live NET programming became a reality on channel 3 in 1961. The staff grew from 11 people to 38 in 1962 and 50 in 1963. In December 1965, WEDU began weekend broadcasting for the first time, making it the first educational station in Florida to institute a regular weekend schedule and the 12th nationwide. The station began holding an annual televised auction in 1968 as a fundraiser.

=== Educational competition and a budget crisis ===
In 1964, WEDU joined with the University of South Florida (USF) to propose the construction of a new transmitter facility in Riverview. The site would house a higher-power WEDU as well as a new UHF station to be owned by the university. After obtaining federal grant money, the site was completed two years later, and WEDU began broadcasting from it on August 30, 1966, with the maximum low-VHF power of 100,000 watts. On September 11, the USF station signed on as WUSF-TV (channel 16). Initially, WUSF-TV had no network programming, as WEDU was the local station for National Educational Television programs. Instead, it focused on providing local shows and college-level telecourses; during the day, the station was off the air while the studios were in use to produce closed-circuit programs. WEDU was supportive of WUSF-TV because, per general manager R. Leroy Lastinger, it provided an outlet for college and higher education needs that channel 3 could not serve alone with its existing commitments. In 1970, PBS supplanted NET as the public television network.

However, shortly after coming on the air, WUSF-TV began angling for more resources and prominence. Within two years, it faced a budget crunch, exacerbated by its status as a secondary outlet with no national network programs. Channel 16 sought parity and the ability to simulcast PBS programs, and it indicated a desire to begin fundraising in the community, which irked WEDU officials fearing a dilution of viewer support and audience. A lobbying battle came to a fever pitch in January 1971, when leaders from the Corporation for Public Broadcasting (CPB) and the Florida Department of Education and several influential state legislators forced leaders of WEDU and WUSF-TV into a motel room to work out their differences. The consensus that emerged allowed WUSF-TV to become a PBS station, but the stations agreed not to simulcast programs. It encouraged channel 16 to develop an alternative lineup to WEDU's programs for schools and children and made it the primary source of local evening programming. To protect WEDU, WUSF-TV agreed not to tap the community for funds. PBS leaders hoped the "Tampa format" could be applied to similar situations in other cities.

Another theme of the late 1960s and early 1970s was changing support from local school systems. As early as 1967, Pinellas County—a major contributor—contemplated ceasing financial support for WEDU. Two of 11 counties pulled out in 1971, Polk and Manatee—one over factional disputes concerning cable TV and another due to its own money woes. In Polk alone, 38,000 students viewed WEDU programs, and the district paid the station's rate of $1.35 per student. When Pinellas reduced its support by nearly half in 1972, WEDU responded by laying off 12 of its 43 employees—including its entire local production unit—and cutting back its broadcast day. In response, the station held an emergency pledge drive and began seeking underwriting support for its programs, which helped alleviate the crunch.

=== Color programming and new facilities ===
In 1971, WEDU began color program production locally when it received a donation of color cameras from WFLA-TV. Florida West Coast Educational Television reincorporated as Florida West Coast Public Broadcasting in 1974 as part of a broadening of its by-laws to permit operation of a radio station.

By the mid-1970s, the old Navy power plant had become inadequate as a studio facility and run-down. Station staff joked, "We'll be all right as long as the termites don't stop holding hands—that's all that is holding this place up." Some employees worked out of two mobile homes parked behind the main studio. Discussion for a new facility had stretched as far back as 1969, when a site near WestShore Plaza was under consideration, but the 1976 session of the Florida Legislature made it a reality by allocating $2.25 million for WEDU to build new studios on property provided by the city of Tampa along North Boulevard near Interstate 75. The construction of the new studios would be overseen by a new general manager; Lastinger, one of WEDU's founders, retired from the position in 1977 (continuing as president until 1982) and was replaced by Mark Damen, an official in the Florida Department of Education. Ground was broken in December 1977; it was not officially opened until February 1980 owing to inflation-related cost overruns.

Despite—and in part because of—the new home, WEDU experienced continued financial cutbacks. County governments were still paring back their contributions to the station; the new building had a higher energy bill and maintenance load. New equipment, poorly maintained, was prone to breaking down; the station still relied on film for production, which meant processing costs and delays. In September 1980, the station adopted a "barebones" budget and laid off seven employees, mostly in local production, canceling its lone local show Three by 3 in the process. The Spanish-language public affairs show Los Nuestro, on the air for eight years, was canceled in 1982 because station leaders believed the newly arrived Spanish International Network had taken what little audience it had.

=== Channel swap attempt ===
On November 30, 1984, WEDU and WTOG-TV (channel 44), owned by Hubbard Broadcasting, jointly announced an agreement where, subject to FCC approval, the two stations would switch channel positions, moving WTOG to VHF channel 3 and WEDU to UHF channel 44. Both stations believed they could benefit from this arrangement. WTOG, Tampa Bay's highest-rated independent station, would shed the stigma among advertisers associated with being a UHF outlet and gain parity with the region's three network affiliates. WEDU would receive new equipment by moving to WTOG's facility, still enjoy access to almost all of the same viewers it had on cable systems, and receive a cash infusion to bolster local programming at a time when federal support for public broadcasting appeared to be waning. The cash infusion, initially reported as $25 million, was later revealed to be about $30 million in cash plus a nearly equal amount in other inducements, such as sharing WTOG's tower site, transmitter improvements, and the electricity bill for five years.

The announcement was met with sharp reaction locally and nationally. WTSP (channel 10), while a VHF station, faced technical constraints that prevented its transmitter from being co-sited with others in the Tampa Bay market. It had to be more northerly to be properly spaced to WPLG in Miami. Over the years, WTSP-TV had proposed a channel change to WEDU on multiple occasions, though Lastinger rejected the station's advances. Beyond Tampa Bay, offers worth millions of dollars came into public TV stations in Minneapolis, San Francisco, Phoenix, and Athens and Savannah, Georgia. The concept of a VHF–UHF swap required an FCC rulemaking, which was equally contested. An FCC decision known as Ashbacker raised the specter that any such swap deal would lead to a requirement to allow competing, mutually exclusive, applications and therefore a comparative hearing. The FCC proposed to allow public comments but otherwise treat a deal like it would a typical commercial station sale. This drew outcry from a string of commercial broadcasters, including such names as Belo Corporation, Capital Cities Communications, Gannett, Tribune Broadcasting, and Taft Broadcasting, who filed comments in opposition of the FCC's proposed rulemaking. They were joined by the National Association of Public Television Stations, the Corporation for Public Broadcasting, the National Education Association, the United Church of Christ, and 11 noncommercial station licensees, which believed any such exchange was subject to Ashbacker restrictions. Others believed a series of swaps would make public television a second-class service. Lawmakers were equally unconvinced. While the commission allowed swaps among two VHF or two UHF stations in March 1986, it did not rule on the more controversial VHF–UHF swap.

Senator Ernest Hollings made an attempt in May 1985 to block the FCC from permitting such swaps. Every year through 1995, Hollings inserted language into the FCC's budget barring it from considering any VHF–UHF swaps. By 1988, the deal was seen as dead; WTOG had put up a new tower without provision for WEDU, whose mast was rusting and which needed a total facility overhaul. Under the provision of the 10-year deal with Hubbard, WEDU received $100,000 a year. Ultimately, in 1990, Hubbard and WEDU reached a different arrangement that saw WEDU move to WTOG's tower, replacing its discontinued and damaged equipment.

=== New ventures and new fiscal battles ===
Damen retired in 1991 and was replaced as general manager by Steve Rogers, who had been the general manager of Miami's WPBT. Among his first priorities was to change the station's fundraising tactics to be more entrepreneurial and less reliant on traditional auctions. The station shifted from such methods as furniture auctions to using national programming and pledge drives to drive donations. A new local show started in 1990—From a Black Perspective, hosted by Syl Farrell—evolved into the broader Tampa Bay Week, a local politics program.

As the federal government looked likely to cut back on public broadcasting support in the mid-1990s, WEDU branched out into new arenas to diversify its revenue. In 1996, WEDU started Telewave Inc., a for-profit subsidiary to produce PBS specials and—more lucratively—sell recordings and videos of them to generate money. While the station had been involved in previous projects involving Yanni and John Tesh, it did not make any money off the former and only some off the latter. WEDU pared back its national programming ambitions in 1998 when they failed to generate the projected revenue. That year, WEDU celebrated its 40th anniversary and launched its first 24-hour program schedule.

Toward the end of Rogers's tenure, WEDU began preparing for a costly conversion to digital television. WTOG's tower lacked space for WEDU to begin digital broadcasting, and WUSF-TV's original 900-foot (270 m) tower was deemed incapable of supporting additional equipment. As a result, both stations joined forces to construct a new, $5 million 1,505-foot (459 m) tower for their digital broadcasts; WEDU owned the tower, while WUSF-TV received lifetime usage rights and a portion of leasing revenues.

In the first years of the new millennium, WEDU saw membership non-renewals grow, eating into its budget just as the digital transition costs began to become a factor. In August 2000, Rogers appeared on-air for a fundraising drive in hopes of closing a $350,000 deficit. In 2001, the station laid off 18 of its 62 employees, once again mostly in production, and canceled Tampa Bay Week. Rogers then departed the station, saying that it was a "good time to hand over the reins" after cutting costs. Though Tampa Bay Week returned, it did so without Farrell, who left WEDU.

The task of turning WEDU around fell to the next general manager: Richard "Dick" Lobo, who came out of retirement after a lengthy career in commercial TV news and management. Under Lobo, WEDU repaired its financial standing and increased revenue from corporate underwriting. An increased use of freelance producers and a side business of renting studio space so guests on national TV programs could appear live using WEDU's satellite uplink contributed to this improvement. Gulf Coast Journal, a weekly magazine program hosted by former NBC News reporter Jack Perkins, aired on the station from 2004 to 2012. In 2006, WEDU won a $1 million donation from the Joy McCann Foundation, the single largest contribution in the station's history, which was divided among a local programming endowment, production equipment, and literacy outreach programs for children.

In the late 2000s, the relationship between WEDU and WUSF-TV, which had remained cordial for decades, deteriorated again. One notable incident involved WUSF selling videos of The Lawrence Welk Show during a pledge drive, hours before Welk aired regularly on WEDU. WUSF-TV management took umbrage at PBS designating channel 16 a secondary station, saying their increased reliance on local programming led to the unfavorable label from PBS. Bright House Networks, the primary cable provider in the Tampa Bay area, exacerbated the strife by exercising a contract in its clause with PBS stations and relegating WUSF-TV, but not WEDU, to a tier where not all subscribers could see it. The relationship was repaired again a year later, when managers of both stations agreed to collaborate on programming as well as a jointly produced fundraising night.

Lobo announced his retirement in September 2009. His replacement was Susan Howarth, who had left WCET in Cincinnati in 2008 upon its merger with ThinkTV of nearby Dayton. Howarth sought to increase the station's local programming and digital presence. Howarth was forced to confront new budget challenges when governor Rick Scott vetoed a funding package for public broadcasting. Between 2007 and 2011, the station's annual budget shrank from $11 million to $7 million in spite of increased programming costs. In 2015, a viewer left WEDU a $4 million bequest, which was used to increase staff and donate equipment to public libraries.

=== Acquisition of WUSF-TV license and programming ===
In 2015, the University of South Florida's board of trustees began exploring options for WUSF-TV, which had lost money for three consecutive fiscal years, in light of the FCC spectrum incentive auction. The station had lost money in fiscal years 2013, 2014, and 2015, and its cash flow was negative for fiscal year 2016; in contrast, WUSF radio was making money.

The incentive auction closed in February 2017, and USF sold the spectrum of WUSF-TV for $18.8 million. The university announced that the station would then cease operations on October 15.

WUSF-TV management had been in talks with their counterparts at WEDU since 2015 about planning to maintain services in the event that the station left the air. On October 8, it was announced that WUSF-TV had entered into a channel sharing agreement with WEDU, enabling the station to continue operations. WUSF-TV's license was transferred to Florida West Coast Public Broadcasting; the transfer was completed on January 24, 2018. With the shutdown on October 15, WEDU picked up the PBS Kids and Create subchannels previously carried by WUSF-TV as well as programs formerly on channel 16's lineup.

=== Paul Grove tenure ===
Howarth died from cancer in September 2018. She was replaced full-time by Paul Grove, who had been the vice president of national programming and production at WEDU before departing in 2006 to run WTCI in Chattanooga, Tennessee.

== Local programming ==
WEDU local programs include the public affairs show Florida This Week; Suncoast Business Forum; and the Greater series of digital shorts focused on specific cities. The latter concept came with Grove from Chattanooga.

== Funding ==
For the year ended September 30, 2023, Florida West Coast Public Broadcasting had total revenue of $17.8 million, more than half in the form of contributions and gifts, and $14.4 million in expenses. For the year ended September 30, 2022, the station had 47,427 members and 438 individual donors.

== Technical information ==
=== Subchannels ===
WEDU and WEDQ are broadcast from a transmitter facility in Riverview.

Subchannels of WEDU and WEDQ
| License | Subchannel | Res. | Short name | Programming |
|---|---|---|---|---|
| WEDU | 3.1 | 1080i | WEDU-HD | PBS |
| WEDU | 3.2 | 480i | WEDU WD | World Channel |
| WEDU | 3.3 | 480i | WEDUNHK | NHK World-Japan |
| WEDQ | 3.4 | 720p | WEDQ | PBS |
| WEDQ | 3.5 | 480i | WEDQK | PBS Kids |
| WEDQ | 3.6 | 480i | WEDU CR | Create |

=== Analog-to-digital conversion ===
WEDU shut down its analog signal, over VHF channel 3, on February 17, 2009, to conclude the federally mandated transition from analog to digital television. The station moved its digital signal from its pre-transition UHF channel 54 to channel 13 on June 12, 2009; it had to wait for WTVT, which used channel 13, to complete its digital transition.
