= Janet Coats =

Media journalism director for Patterson Foundation

Janet Coats (born May 6, 1963, in Cleveland, Tennessee) is new media journalism director for the Patterson Foundation in Sarasota, Fla. Formerly she was executive editor of The Tampa Tribune.>

== Biography ==
Coats grew up in Ooltewah, Tennessee. A 1984 graduate of the University of Missouri with a bachelor of journalism degree, Coats began her career as a reporter at the Irving (Texas) Daily News, later working as a reporter or editor at the Stuart (Fla.) News, The Virginian-Pilot, Norfolk, Wichita (Kansas) Eagle and Sarasota (Fla.) Herald-Tribune, finishing at that paper as executive editor.

She was briefly dean of the faculty of the Poynter Institute before joining the Tribune in 2005. She advanced there, finishing as executive editor and vice president of the news operation at Florida Communications Group in 2009.

She joined the Patterson Foundation in 2010.

Coats served as a juror for the Pulitzer Prize five times and served on the board of the American Society of Newspaper Editors from 2003 until 2009.

She has three children.
