= West Orange Times & Observer =

Newspaper published in Winter Garden, Florida

- Type: Weekly newspaper
- Format: Tabloid
- Owner: Observer Media Group
- Publisher: Mike Eng
- Editor-in-chief: Mike Eng
- Founded: 1905
- Headquarters: Winter Garden, Florida
- Circulation: 31,489
- OCLC number: 35207635
- Website: orangeobserver.com

The West Orange Times & Observer is an American paid newspaper published by Observer Media Group. It is available for delivery in western Orange County, Florida.

As of 2019, the West Orange Times & Observer and the Southwest Orange Observer (Windermere, Dr. Phillips and Horizon West), both free publications, have a combined circulation of 31,489 copies and are distributed weekly on Thursdays.

== History ==
The Winter Garden Ricochet was first published on Sept. 13, 1905 by A.B. Newton. A year later, Newton bought The Apopka Citizen and merged the papers together. He sold the Ricochet in 1909. The paper changed names and ownership a number of times over the decades. In 1970, George Bailey, a Korean War veteran, bought the Winter Garden Times which he renamed the West Orange Times. It was acquired by Observer Media Group in 2014. The company split the newspaper to create the West Orange Times & Observer and Southwest Orange Observer.

OMG is headquartered in Sarasota, Florida, and West Orange Times & Observer is part of a family of twelve newspapers in Florida, some of which were founded by OMG, others were acquired by OMG. Most of them now utilize the corporate brand of "Observer" in the title which came from Longboat Observer, the first OMG-owned paper.
