= Paul Tash =

American journalist

Paul C. Tash (born circa 1954) is the former chairman and CEO of the Tampa Bay Times and Times Publishing Company, which used to publish Congressional Quarterly—a publication that was sold to the Economist Group in 2009. He began working for the Times as a local news reporter. From 1990 to 1991, he was the editor and publisher of Florida Trend, which was owned by Times Publishing.

== Family ==
He is married to Karyn Tash, a high school teacher of the International Baccalaureate at St. Petersburg High School. Together they have two daughters. One is a physician at Duke University Medical Center and the other is a local lawyer in Tampa.

== Education ==
Tash graduated from Andrew Jackson High School in South Bend, Indiana in 1972 and graduated summa cum laude from Indiana University Bloomington in 1976. Two years later, he attended the Edinburgh Law School in Scotland on a Marshall Scholarship, graduating with a bachelor of laws degree. He graduated magna cum laude from the University of Edinburgh.

== Awards ==
Tash received the Distinguished Alumni Service Award from Indiana University in 2012. He was also selected to be inducted into the Indiana Journalism Hall of Fame.

== Organizations ==
In 2006 he was made a member of the Pulitzer Prize board, the Associated Press, and the Committee to Protect Journalists. He is also a member of the Florida Council of 100, a group of business leaders.
