= Richard LeSesne =

American photographer

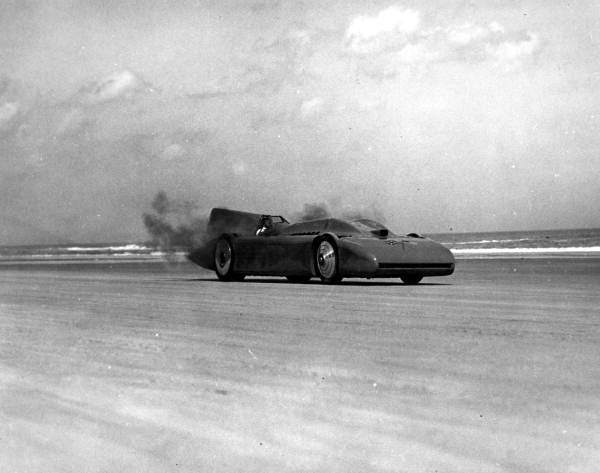
Malcolm Campbell's Blue Bird in 1935

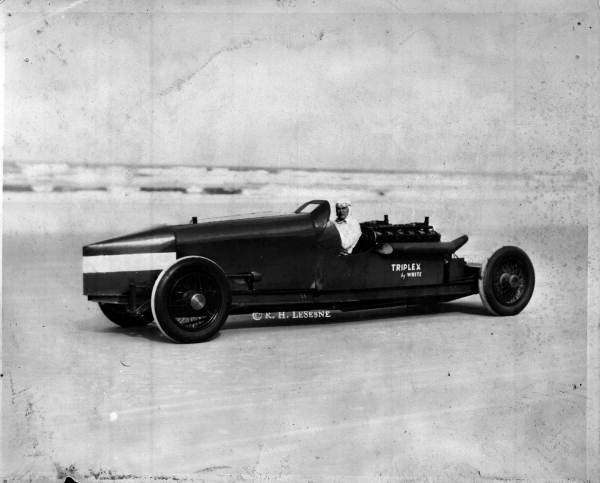
The White Triplex

Richard H. LeSesne was an American photographer, noted for his photography of land speed record attempts on Daytona Beach, Florida, in the 1920s and 1930s. More than merely a recorder of other peoples' efforts, LeSesne achieved some celebrity himself as the photographer of these attempts and his signature may be found on photographs of the period along with those of other team members and even the driver himself.

He was active from at least 1897 to 1935.

Many of his photographs are now held in the Florida Photographic Collection.
