= Dorothy Dodd (librarian) =

First State Archivist and second State Librarian of Florida

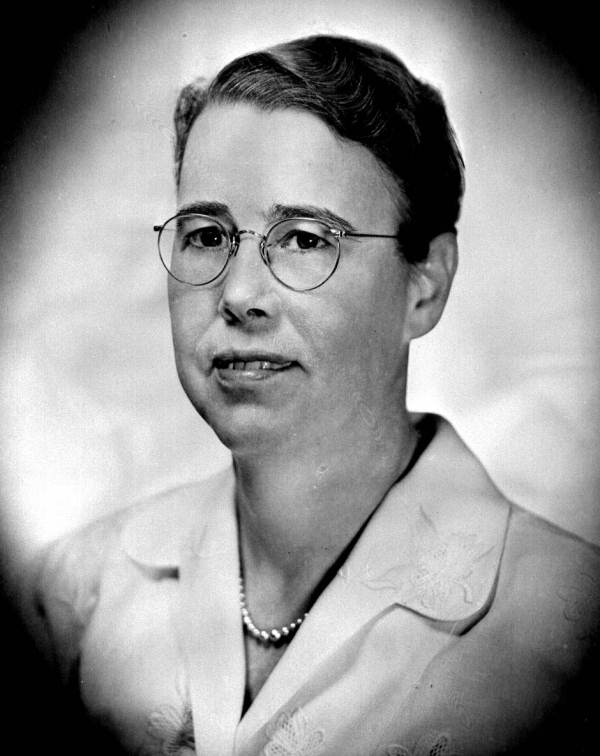
- Born: April 19, 1902
- Died: August 19, 1994 (aged 92)
- Education: Florida State College for Women (BA); Columbia University (MA); University of Chicago (PhD)
- Occupations: Librarian, archivist

Dorothy Dodd (April 19, 1902 – August 19, 1994) was the first State Archivist and second State Librarian of Florida. She was inducted into the Florida Women's Hall of Fame in 1986.

== Education ==
Dodd attended the Florida State College for Women. She then graduated from Columbia University in 1925 with a master's degree in journalism. She later earned her doctorate in history from the University of Chicago.

== Career ==
Dodd was appointed as Florida's first State Archivist in 1941. She preserved more than 15,000 cataloged items from around the state for the Florida Collection of the State Library of Florida, equaling a total of 260 linear feet. In addition to numerous published articles, Dodd edited Florida Becomes a State (OCLC 428894678) in 1945, using many of the resources she had acquired, and later wrote Florida, the Land of Romance (OCLC 428829204). Ten years later, in 1951, she succeeded William Thomas Cash as State Librarian. She retired in 1965. She retired as State Librarian in 1965.

=== Controversy ===
In 1959, Dodd released a staff manual detailing policies for regional branches, one policy including the particular selection of children's books. The manual listed various books advised to be removed from libraries on account of their being "poorly written, untrue to life...unwholesome for the children in your community." Among those mentioned were The Wizard of Oz series, Tarzan, Nancy Drew, Boy and Girl Scout series, and works by Horatio Alger. The decision caused much outcry from the community, including Governor LeRoy Collins, a fan of Horatio Alger. Patrons accused her of censorship, which Dodd denied as the intent of the policy. She did, however, firmly stand by her decision, explaining that while she did not oppose children reading poorly written books, she did not want the library to be where children could find those books.

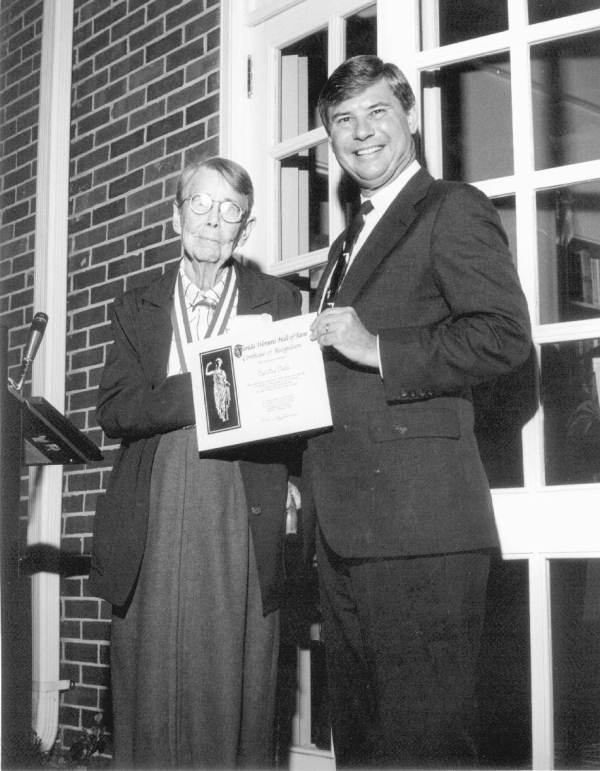
Governor Bob Graham presenting certificate to Dodd

== See also ==
- State Library and Archives of Florida
