= WGCU (TV) =

Television station in Fort Myers, Florida

- Fort Myers–Naples, Florida; United States
- City: Fort Myers, Florida
- Channels: Digital: 22 (UHF); Virtual: 30
- Branding: WGCU PBS

Programming
- Affiliations: 30.1: PBS; for others, see § Subchannels

Ownership
- Owner: Board of Trustees, Florida Gulf Coast University
- Sister stations: WGCU-FM

History
- First air date: August 15, 1983
- Former call signs: WSFP-TV (1983–1996)
- Former channel numbers: Analog: 30 (UHF, 1983–2009); Digital: 31 (2004–2020)
- Call sign meaning: Florida Gulf Coast University

Technical information
- Licensing authority: FCC
- Facility ID: 62388
- ERP: 750 kW
- HAAT: 276 m (906 ft)
- Transmitter coordinates: 26°48′55″N 81°45′42″W

Links
- Public license information: Public file; LMS
- Website: wgcu.org

WGCU (channel 30) is a PBS member television station in Fort Myers, Florida, United States. Owned by Florida Gulf Coast University (FGCU), it is a sister station to NPR member WGCU-FM (90.1). The two stations share studios at the Myra Janco Daniels Public Media Center on the FGCU campus in Fort Myers and transmitter facilities in southern Charlotte County.

Public television came to Southwest Florida when channel 30 began broadcasting as WSFP-TV on August 15, 1983. It was founded as a service of the University of South Florida (USF), which had a campus in Fort Myers. The station repeated USF's station in Tampa, WUSF-TV. In 1988, WSFP-TV moved into its first local studio facilities, enabling it to begin producing local programming and qualify for federal grants.

USF–Fort Myers was absorbed by Florida Gulf Coast University in stages: WSFP-TV became WGCU on July 1, 1996, when the new university took over operations of both stations—a year before it held its first classes. The Myra Janco Daniels Public Media Center, which houses the studios of WGCU radio and television, was completed on the FGCU campus in 1998. The station offers PBS national and local programming.

== History ==
=== University of South Florida ownership ===
The University of South Florida (USF) filed on February 21, 1978, for a construction permit to build a new public television station on channel 30 in Fort Myers. After obtaining an $800,000 federal grant and state funds to help finance construction, the Federal Communications Commission (FCC) granted the permit on September 16, 1980. To this project was later added a radio station, both of which would be broadcast from a tower to be built in the Cecil M. Webb Wildlife Management Area in southern Charlotte County. WSFP-TV and WSFP-FM would initially serve to rebroadcast the university's stations in Tampa, WUSF-TV and WUSF-FM, though USF intended for the two to become separate, locally focused stations at a later date.

After delays in construction caused by the legal description of the deed to the tower site and rainy weather, WSFP-TV signed on on August 15, 1983, filling a void in national public television coverage. The new station had limited capability beyond rebroadcasting WUSF-TV with no local studios, though it had an agreement to use facilities of Edison Community College and USF owned a remote studio van that could be sent to Southwest Florida if needed. Less than a month after the TV station, USF brought public radio to Southwest Florida with the launch of WSFP-FM 90.1. WSFP's television and radio debut coincided with an increasing presence of the University of South Florida in the Fort Myers area. USF had been offering courses in the area since 1971, but in 1982, the USF–Fort Myers campus was completed adjacent to Edison Community College.

In 1988, WSFP-TV moved in to WEVU's former studios in Bonita Springs when that station relocated to new facilities in town. The move made WSFP-TV eligible for grants from the Corporation for Public Broadcasting and the state government as a full station with its own production facilities. The station began producing local programs such as Southwest Florida Business Week, a series on fishing in Sanibel, and profiles of local legislators.

=== Florida Gulf Coast University ownership ===
In 1991, state legislators authorized the creation of a tenth state university to be built in Southwest Florida. Three years later, they named it Florida Gulf Coast University (FGCU). USF–Fort Myers formed the backbone of the student body for FGCU, which would open to students for the fall 1997 semester. The new university would become the licensee of the WSFP stations on July 1, 1996, as part of the transition of people and responsibilities from USF–Fort Myers, and the new university began seeking architects to design a broadcast center in the first phase of campus construction. The broadcast center would unite WSFP-TV, based in Bonita Springs, with WSFP-FM, which operated on the USF–Fort Myers campus.

When the transfer became effective on July 1, 1996, WSFP radio and television changed their call signs to WGCU. At that time, construction began on the broadcast center at the FGCU campus, which would feature a 3,000-square-foot (280 m^{2}) television studio. During this time, the station aired a weekly update show on the progress of campus construction. When WSFP-TV moved into the new broadcast center in January 1998, it eliminated the 45-minute drive from the Bonita Springs studio to the master control facility at the transmitter site, necessary to play out recorded programs.

In 2016, Myra Janco Daniels, an advertising executive and arts philanthropist, donated $3 million to WGCU to support arts programming on television. After the gift, the broadcast center was renamed the Myra Janco Daniels Public Media Center.

== Local programming ==
In 2003, WGCU began producing Untold Stories, a series of history documentaries on Southwest Florida. In 2024, WGCU established a documentary unit and revived Untold Stories for a new episode on Bailey's General Store on Sanibel Island. The station also launched Southwest Florida In Focus, a weekly newsmagazine, which it intends to become a daily series within three years. The program is produced on a set formerly used for the PBS News Hour.

== Funding ==
WGCU TV had total revenue in fiscal year 2024 of $9.74 million. $1.53 million of this total came from the station's 13,471 members. The Corporation for Public Broadcasting contributed $1.22 million, mostly in the form of a Community Service Grant. Florida Gulf Coast University appropriated $450,000. A total of 231 major donors contributed $1.2 million in gifts and bequests.

== Technical information ==
=== Subchannels ===
WGCU is broadcast from a transmitter facility in southern Charlotte County. The station's signal is multiplexed:

Subchannels of WGCU
Subchannel	Res.	Short name	Programming
30.1	1080i	WGCU-HD	PBS
30.2	480i	WORLD	World
30.3	480i	CREATE	Create
30.4	480i	FLCH	The Florida Channel
30.5	480i	PBSKids	PBS Kids
30.6	Audio only	WGCU-FM	Simulcast of WGCU-FM

=== Analog-to-digital conversion ===
WGCU began broadcasting a digital signal in February 2004. The station discontinued regular programming on its analog signal, on UHF channel 30, on June 12, 2009, the official date on which full-power television stations in the United States transitioned from analog to digital broadcasts under federal mandate. The station's digital signal continued to broadcast on its pre-transition UHF channel 31, using virtual channel 30.

WGCU relocated its signal from channel 31 to channel 22 on March 10, 2020, as a result of the 2016 United States wireless spectrum auction. The work also included a rebuild of the station's tower.
