= Florida Photographic Collection =

Component of the State Archives of Florida

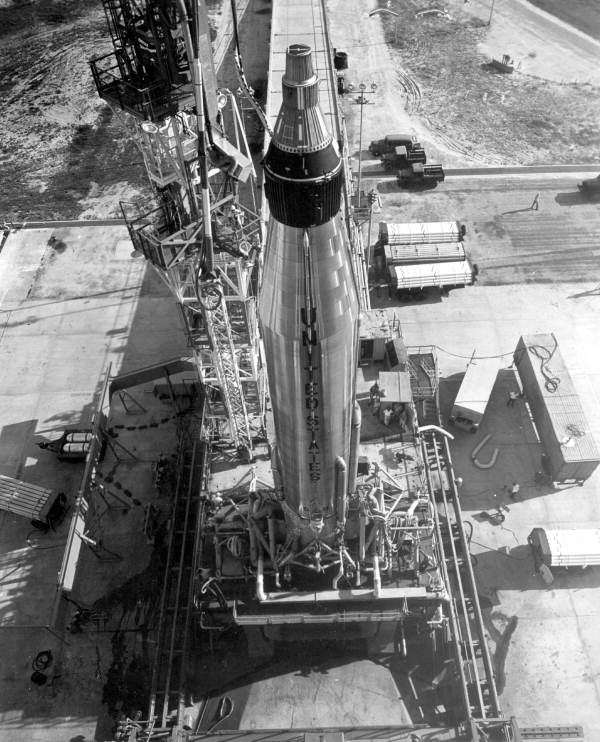
Mercury-Atlas at Cape Canaveral (1959)

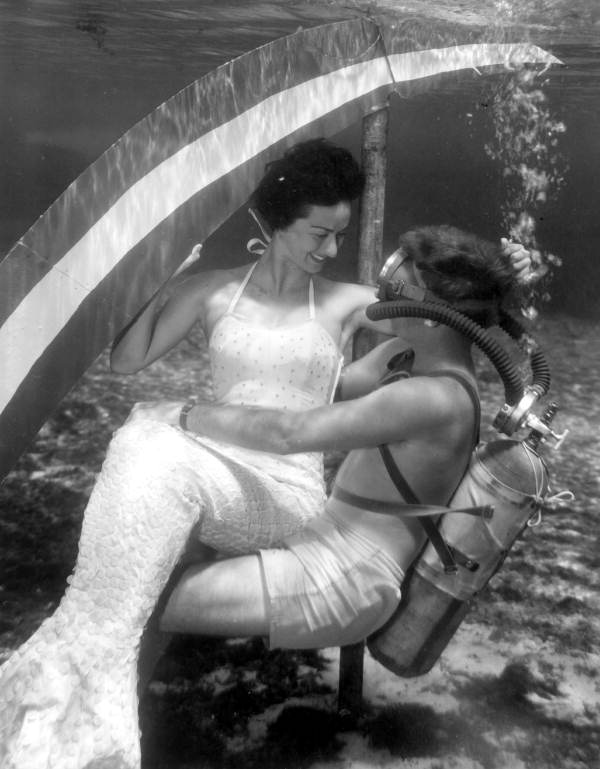
Fishing for Mermaids at Rainbow Springs (1956)

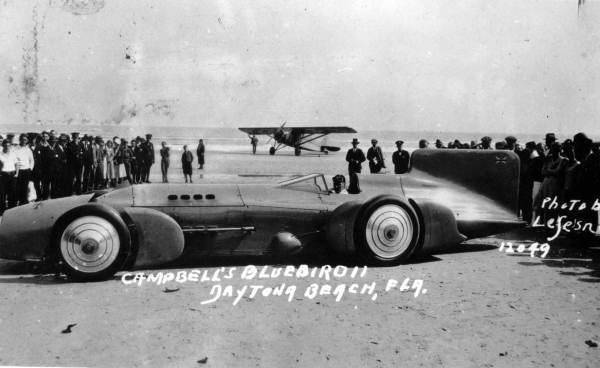
Photo by Richard LeSesne of the Campbell-Napier-Railton Blue Bird, having set the land speed record on Daytona Beach (1931)

The Florida Photographic Collection is a nationally recognized component of the State Archives of Florida and contains over a million images, and over 6,000 movies and video tapes. Over 200,000 of the photographs are available through the Florida Memory Program web site.

"Featuring over 200,000 digitized photographs from the State Archives of Florida, the Florida Photographic Collection is the most complete online portrait of Florida available--one that draws its strength from family pictures, the homes of Floridians, their work, and their pastimes."

The collection spans a wide range of visual images from copies of mid 15th century maps to current photographs. Topics of note are rocket launches from Cape Canaveral, Land Speed Record attempts on Daytona Beach and a vast number on holidaymaking.

== Copyright information for the archive ==
The use of photographs and other materials in the custody of the State Archives of Florida is governed by state law and, in some cases, by the terms of the donation agreement under which the Archives acquired the images. In accordance with the provisions of Section 257.35(6), Florida Statutes, "Any use or reproduction of material deposited with the Florida Photographic Collection shall be allowed pursuant to the provisions of paragraph (1)(b) and subsection (4), provided that appropriate credit for its use is given." Please contact the Archives if you have any questions regarding the credit and use of any material presented on this Web site.

Additionally a direct request to the Florida Archives, specifically concerning use on Wikipedia / Wikicommons (13 May 2008) elicited the following response:

You may use any of the images posted on the Florida Memory Project website. The State Archives of Florida is not aware of any copyright issues with any of the images.

See also the Wikimedia Commons template: {{Image from the Florida Photographic Collection}}

== See also ==
- Allen Morris (historian) - The creator of the Florida Photographic Collection
- Florida Memory Program
