= Jacksonville Daily Record =

Newspaper in Jacksonville, Florida

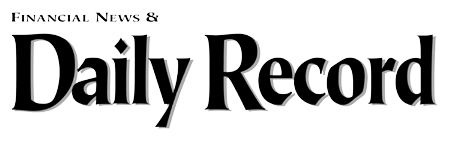

- January 27, 2012 front page
- Type: Weekly newspaper
- Format: Tab
- Owner(s): Observer Media Group
- Publisher: Angela Campbell
- Editor-in-chief: Monty Zickuhr
- Editor: Karen Brune Mathis
- Founded: 1912
- Language: English
- Headquarters: 121 W. Forsyth St, Suite 150; Jacksonville, FL 32202
- Circulation: 5,000
- Website: jaxdailyrecord.com

The Jacksonville Daily Record, formerly the Financial News & Daily Record, is a weekly newspaper that has been published in Jacksonville, Florida since 1912.

== Overview ==
The Daily Record primarily publishes urban development, financial, and legal related news, articles, and profiles. It is the official newspaper of The Jacksonville Bar Association, Duval County Court, and the U.S. Bankruptcy Court for the Middle District of Florida. The paper is the primary publisher of legal notices in Duval County. Synopses from documents filed by The Clerk of the Circuit Court are published.

== History ==
Founded in 1912, The Daily Record is currently published by Observer Media Group, which bought the newspaper from third-generation owner James F. Bailey Jr. in January 2017. Bailey was publisher for 41 years. His family owned the newspaper for 104 years.
