= The Weekly Challenger =

African-American newspaper in Florida, US

The Weekly Challenger is an African-American news source serving Tampa and St. Petersburg, Florida. The newspaper publishes online articles daily. The newspaper was founded by Cleveland Johnson Jr. and is based in St. Petersburg and is considered a historical aspect of the city. Despite being distributed in St. Petersburg, Clearwater, Largo, Tarpon Springs, Dunedin, and Safety Harbor, its main readers are based in St. Petersburg.The Weekly Challenger has played a large role in the documentation of African Americans' history in St. Petersburg since its initial release in 1967. The preservation of the newspaper is of vital importance to the African American community of St. Petersburg. The city is working on digitizing old and new copies of The Weekly Challenger to allow its history to be preserved in a sustainable way. Although this newspaper is not widely recognized, its historical significance in St. Petersburg is extremely important to members of the town.

Lyn Johnson is the Publisher/General Manager of The Weekly Challenger, the newspaper does not have any publicized affiliations.

Ethel Johnson, the paper's owner, died in 2023.
