= William T. Cash =

American politician

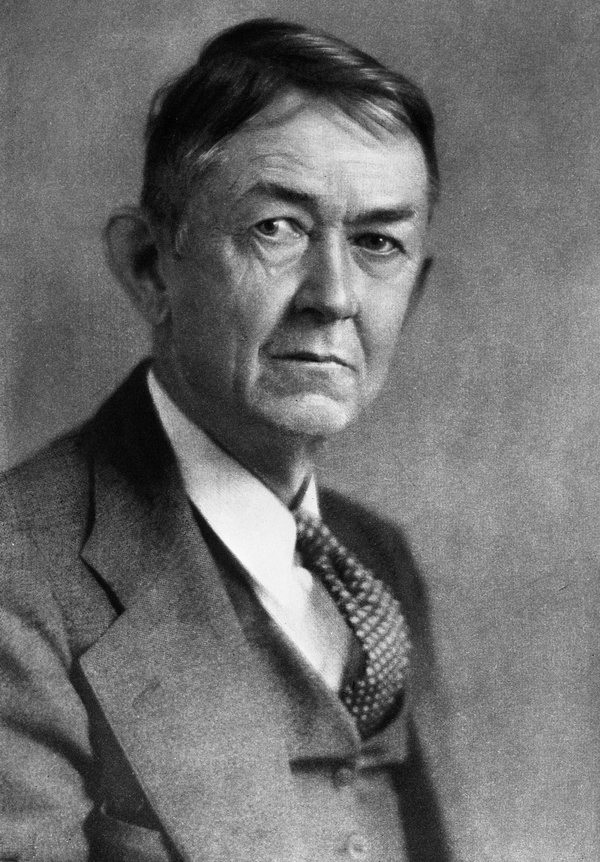
W. T. Cash in 1938

William Thomas Cash (1878–1951) was an educator, writer, Florida State Representative, Florida State Senator, and Florida's first state librarian. He is listed as a Great Floridian. A collection of his papers are held at the Florida State Archives. Some of his papers are also collected at Florida State University.

== Early life and education ==
Cash was born in Lamont, Florida in Jefferson County, Florida on July 23, 1878. Benjamin Franklin Cash and Susan Mixon Cash were his parents. His father died when Cash was thirteen. His mother remarried to John Henry Mathis in 1886, having three more children. Cash worked as a farmworker while he was a teenager to support himself since he did not live with his mother. He was taught in a Taylor County public school by Cary A. Hardee, who influenced him to become a teacher. When he was nineteen years old, he became certified to be a teacher.

== Career ==
Cash was a teacher and later became President of the Taylor County Teacher's Association. In 1917, he taught Florida History and civic courses during summer school at the Florida State College for Women in Tallahassee.

Cash was elected to the Florida House of Representatives in 1909, 1915, and 1917. He was elected to the Florida Senate in 1918 and served two years of his term before departing to become Superintendent of Public Instruction for Taylor County. He helped pass legislation that created the Florida State Library and served as the first Florida State Librarian beginning in 1927. He remained the state librarian until retiring shortly before his death.

Cash worked during the Great Depression and World War II, was an advocate for social spending, and was involved in the New Deal Rare Books Project. He died in Tallahassee, Florida on July 8, 1951.

== Bibliography ==
- "History of the Democratic Party in Florida: Including Biographical Sketches of Prominent Florida Democrats" (1936)
- "Political Parties of Florida" (1938)
- "The Story of Florida" (1938)
- "Florida Becomes a State" by W. T. Cash and Dorothy Dodd. (1945)
- "Events in the History of St. Marks" (1946)
