= Suwannee Democrat =

Newspaper in Florida, US, 1897 to 2020

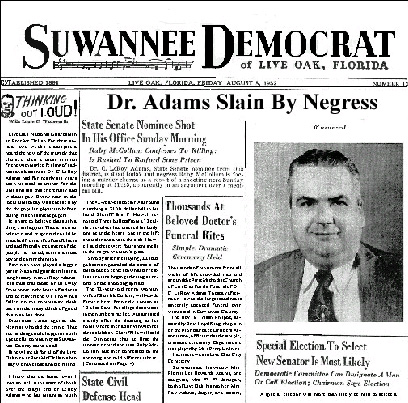

The Suwannee Democrat was a newspaper in Live Oak, Florida the county seat of Suwannee County. It was established in 1897. It closed in 2020.

It originated as a newspaper in Lake City in 1884. The paper was established in 1897 by J. E. Pound who bought the Leader and Banner of Freedom newspapers and consolidated them to form the Suwannee Democrat.It was published twice a week.

Live Oak was the fifth most populous community in Florida. It affiliated with the Democratic Party. Early papers were lost in a fire.

It was edited by F. R. McCormack. It was published by J. E. Pound. Mrs. F. R. McCormack was listed as its editor in 1925.

C. P. Helfenstein bought the paper in 1929. Louie Wadsworth bought it in 1946. Ca. 1972 he sold it to Danny McCrimon. The paper relocated the form Sinclair Dodge dealership. Jamie Wachter served as editor.
