= Times Publishing Company =

Publisher of the Tampa Bay Times

Times Publishing Company is a newspaper and magazine publisher. Its flagship publication is the Tampa Bay Times (formerly the St. Petersburg Times), a daily newspaper serving the Tampa Bay area. It also publishes the business magazine Florida Trend and the daily newspaper tbt*.

Times Publishing Company is based in St. Petersburg, Florida, and is owned by the Poynter Institute, a nonprofit journalism school in St. Petersburg. The current chairman and CEO of Times Publishing Company is Paul Tash, who also serves as editor of the Tampa Bay Times.

On January 1, 2012, the St. Petersburg Times was renamed the Tampa Bay Times, with tbt* (which was an acronym for "Tampa Bay Times") only referred to by that name.

== Properties ==
The Times Publishing Company owns several other publications, most of which are co-branded with the Tampa Bay Times.

- tampabay.com is the online presence of the Times. Articles are free to view. Subscribers to the printed or electronic editions of the Times have access to a digital edition of the Times that resembles the layout of the printed paper.
- Bay is an upscale magazine distributed to subscribers in select neighborhoods of the Tampa Bay area in their Sunday editions of the Tampa Bay Times and published six times a year. It began publication in 2008.
- Florida Trend is a business-oriented news publication. It describes itself as "the respected source of insight for Florida's leaders—business executives, top government officials, and civic trend-setters". Its monthly print readership is 150,000.
- Tampa Bay Newspapers are weekly papers that serve local communities in central Pinellas County. They include the Beach Beacon, Belleair Bee, Clearwater Beacon, Dunedin Beacon, Largo Leader, Seminole Beacon, and Pinellas Park Beacon, as well as TBN Weekly Online and a digital edition. Tampa Bay Newspapers' general office is located in Seminole. Their combined circulation is 143,000.
- tbt* is a free weekday tabloid that is marketed to "mainly 25- to 39-year-olds" in the Tampa Bay area. A large proportion of its content is about social events. Its daily circulation is approximately 80,000.
- tb-two* is a weekly tabloid written by high school students in the Tampa Bay area in collaboration with the editors of tbt* and the Times. It began publication in 2009. It is released every Thursday with a circulation of around 60,000 weekly.
- Senior Living Guide is a directory of housing, home care, and medical care services for seniors. It reaches 500,000 readers.
- Times Events are exhibitions around the Tampa Bay area presented by the Times. They include home shows and job fairs.
- PolitiFact is an online journalistic undertaking that ferrets out the truth in American politics. It won the Pulitzer for national reporting in 2009.

The Times owned and published an evening newspaper, the Evening Independent, from 1962 until its closure in 1986. Issues of the Evening Independent are available for viewing on Google News Archive.

On May 3, 2016, the Times Publishing Company announced the purchase of the Times' competing newspaper, The Tampa Tribune, from Revolution Capital Group, saying it intended to create one financially secure, locally owned daily newspaper in the Tampa Bay region. The Times ended publication of the Tribune on that day. The Times' acquisition of the Tribune also includes the following publications, which would continue publishing:

- Highlands Today, a daily newspaper serving Highlands County, Florida, previously issued as a supplement of the Tribune.
- The Suncoast News, a chain of weekly neighborhood newspapers in Pasco and northern Pinellas Counties.
- Centro, a weekly Spanish-language newspaper.

Highlands Today was sold and closed later in 2016.
