= Jax Air News =

Newspaper

- Type: Weekly newspaper
- Founded: April 1, 1943
- Ceased publication: February 2019
- OCLC number: 33313438
- Website: jaxairnews.com

The Jax Air News was a newspaper published in Jacksonville, Florida from 1943 to 2019 for members of the military services and their families. It served the Naval Air Station in Jacksonville (NAS Jax).
