= Hernando Today =

Defunct newspaper

- Front cover of the Hernando Today for November 14, 2014
- Type: Daily newspaper
- Format: Broadsheet
- Owner: Tampa Media Group
- Publisher: Duane Chichester
- Editor: Michael Terry
- Founded: 1981 (as The Green Sheet)
- Ceased publication: 2014
- Language: English
- Sister newspapers: The Tampa Tribune
- Website: Official website

Hernando Today was a daily newspaper based in Brooksville, Florida covering Hernando County that published from 1987 to 2014. It was closed by the Tampa Tribune on November 30, 2014. There are still two newspapers covering Hernando County: Tampa Bay Times and Hernando Sun.

== History ==
The newspaper had its origins in an advertising shopper called The Green Sheet in 1981. In 1987, Media General, the parent company of The Tampa Tribune, joined with Gulf Coast Media Group to turn it into a free weekly newspaper, Hernando Today. It began publishing on November 11, 1987. It was, in a sense, a competitor to the Tribune, which was publishing a daily Hernando County edition. It moved to publishing twice a week in April 1988, an by April 1990 had a circulation of 37,500.

In 1993, the paper became fully owned by Media General, and the sales and circulation staff of the Tribune and Today were merged the next year. With the growth of the county's population, the paper converted from a three-day-a-week to a daily newspaper in April 1996, and the Hernando section of the Tribune was disbanded in favor of packaging Hernando Today to all Tribune subscribers in Hernando County, though the Today was still made available for separate sale by subscription and on newsstands as well.

In January 2009, the paper ceased publishing on Mondays and Tuesdays.

The paper ceased publishing on November 30, 2014. The Tribune's managing editor blamed a "tough newspaper advertising climate" as making the by-then twice-weekly paper unprofitable. The Tribune itself only lasted 18 more months, and was acquired by the Tampa Bay Times (renamed from St. Petersburg Times in 2011) in May 2016.
