= Observer Media Group =

American company

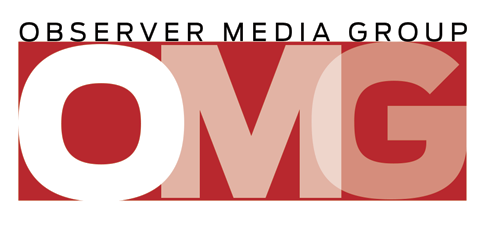
- Type: Private
- Industry: Online and print media
- Founded: 1995; 31 years ago
- Founders: Matt Walsh; Lisa Walsh
- Headquarters: Sarasota, Florida, United States
- Area served: Southern Florida
- Key people: David Beliles, chairman Matt Walsh, CEO
- Number of employees: 120
- Website: www.yourobserver.com

Observer Media Group, Inc. (OMG) is a media company that publishes local newspapers and magazines in the U.S. state of Florida. The company publishes seven newspapers, nine quarterly magazines, and maintains four news websites.

== History ==
Observer Media Group started when Matt Walsh and Lisa Walsh purchased the Longboat Observer in 1995 from Ralph and Claire Hunter, with the help of Lisa's parents and a small group of other investors. The Hunters had started the Longboat Observer in 1978.

Since then, Observer Media Group established new local newspapers, such as the Sarasota Observer in 2004, and acquired other older newspapers, such as the 100+ year-old West Orange Times in 2014 and Financial News & Daily Record in 2017. OMG maintains journalistic offices in Tampa, Clearwater, Lakeland, Sarasota, Fort Myers, Naples, New Port Richey, Winter Garden, Lakewood Ranch and Port Charlotte. The name was changed to Observer Media Group in 2012 from The Observer Group.

Observer Media acquired Pelican Press from Wisconsin-based Journal Media Group in 2011. Pelican Press serves the Siesta Key area of Florida and in 2013, OMG renamed the paper to Siesta Key Observer to fit its overall branding.

In 2012, The Observer attempted to publish the Palm Coast Observer twice a week, on Wednesdays and Saturdays. With a circulation of 25,000, OMG abandoned the idea and returned to a Thursday-only publishing schedule. The move, however, saw circulation increase to 30,000. "At first glance it looks like we may have an overall increase in ad revenue. And lower delivery cost," observed CEO Matt Walsh at the time. "In any business manual it is a wonderful thing to increase revenue and reduce cost at the same time." August 1, 2013, saw the launch of the Plant City Times & Observer with an initial run of 15,000 copies, the publication was sold to a group of local investors in December, 2018.

In 2016, Emily Walsh was named publisher of several of OMG's assets, including East County Observer, Longboat Observer, Sarasota Observer, Siesta Key Observer, YourObserver.com, Season magazine and LWR Life magazine. As the daughter of the founders, Emily Walsh has worked most of her career for OMG. Ms. Walsh became president in 2021.

Altogether our newspapers, magazines and websites reach more than 412,400 readers a week.

== Publications ==
As of 2025, Observer Media Group owns seven newspapers (directly or indirectly), nine magazines and four websites in support of the print editions, reaching more than 412,400 readers per week. OMG works with Press Reader the largest digital newsstand, to publish online digital copies of its print material.

Name	Since	Format	Frequency	Area served	Paid or free	Circulation	Website	Notes
Business Observer	1997	Tabloid	Weekly	Southwest Florida	Paid	5,222	https://www.businessobserverfl.com/	Formerly known as Gulf Coast Business Review
East County Observer	1998	Broadsheet	Weekly	Sarasota-Bradenton	Free	18,161	https://www.yourobserver.com/east-county	
Jacksonville Daily Record	1912	Tabloid	Daily	Jacksonville	Paid	4,895	https://www.jaxdailyrecord.com/	
Longboat Observer	1978	Broadsheet	Weekly	Longboat Key	Free	10,573	https://www.yourobserver.com/longboat-key	First publication owned by OMG
LWR Life	2014	Magazine	Quarterly	Lakewood Ranch	Free	24,000	None, but digital editions available here	Partnership with Schroeder-Manatee Ranch, Inc., a land management company
Ormond Beach Observer	2013	Broadsheet	Weekly	Ormond Beach	Free	6,000	https://www.observerlocalnews.com/	The newspaper was sold to the McMillan Group in 2023.
Palm Coast Observer	2010	Broadsheet	Weekly	Palm Coast	Free	12,000	https://www.palmcoastobserver.com/	The newspaper was sold to the McMillan Group in 2023.
Plant City Times & Observer	2012	Tabloid	Weekly	Plant City	Free	13,500	https://www.plantcityobserver.com/	Joint venture with Times Publishing Company The paper was sold in 2019 to local ownership.
Daytona Beach Observer	2013	Tabloid	Weekly	Daytona Beach	Free		https://www.daytonabeachobserver.com/	
Port Orange Observer	1987 or 2017	Tabloid	Monthly	Port Orange	Free	2,500	https://www.portorangeobserver.com/	July 13, 2017 edition is called "Volume 1, No. 1" so it may be titled same as a defunct paper
Siesta Key Observer	1971	Broadsheet	Weekly	Siesta Key	Free	5,520	https://www.yourobserver.com/siesta-key	Founded by John and Elizabeth Davidson as The Key News to the Key; later Siesta Key Pelican then Pelican Press sold to OMG 2011; changed to current name 2015. In 2016, Emily Walsh was publisher
Season	2000	Magazine	Quarterly	Sarasota area	Free	53,600	None, but digital editions available here	
Sarasota Observer	2004	Broadsheet	Weekly	Sarasota	Free	21,891	https://www.yourobserver.com/sarasota	Established in 2004 to serve downtown Sarasota and Siesta Key, it was a weekly publication. As of 2024, it has a circulation of 24,175 and is distributed weekly on Thursdays. The website is YourObserver.com and is updated daily.
West Orange Times & Observer	1904	Broadsheet	Weekly	Western Orange County	Free	8,846	https://www.orangeobserver.com/west-orange-times-observer	
Southwest Orange Observer	2015	Broadsheet	Weekly	Windermere	Free	7,240	https://www.orangeobserver.com/windermere-observer	
Winter Park-Maitland Observer	1989	Tall tabloid	Weekly	Suburbs of Orlando	Free	12000	https://www.orangeobserver.com/winter-park-maitland-observer	This paper was closed permanently after the May 17, 2019 issue, marking the end of its 30-year run.
