= Florida Memory =

- Website type: Digital library
- Headquarters: Tallahassee, Florida
- Owner: Florida Department of State
- Website: www.floridamemory.com
- Launched: 1996; 30 years ago
- Current status: Active

Florida Memory or the Florida Memory Program (formerly known as the Florida Photographic Digital Imaging Project and Florida Memory Project) is a Library Services and Technology Act-funded internet-based digital outreach program providing free online access to primary source materials including historical photographs, audio, video, and textual documents from collections housed in the State Library and Archives of Florida. The Florida Memory Program also produces educational content through educational materials, teacher's lesson plans, a Florida history blog, and online exhibits.

Florida Memory is a program of the Bureau of Archives and Records Management within the Division of Library and Information Services of the Florida Department of State.

== Timeline ==
- 1994 - The State Archives of Florida received an LSCA grant for an initiative to digitize portions of the Florida Photographic Collection and publish them online. The initiative was called the Florida Photographic Digital Imaging Project.
- 1996 - The website launches as Florida State Archives Florida Photographic Collection.
- 2000 - The website was branded the Florida Memory Project and was expanded to include educational resources for teachers.
- 2003 - The Florida Folklife Collection project begins and the first of six music CDs is produced.
- 2011 - The initiative was renamed the Florida Memory Program and moved the site content to the Omeka content management system and was expanded to include video and audio.
- 2015 - The program launched a streaming radio which received a Society of American Archivists Archival Innovator Award.

== Content ==
Florida Memory provides access to a wide variety of primary source materials covering the entire state including:

- Over 200,000 digitized and cataloged photographs from the Florida Photographic Collection which are public domain.
- Hundreds of audio recordings including interviews, field recordings and performances at the Florida Folk Festival dating back to 1954.
- Several hundred digitized videos dating from 1916 to the 1980s.
- Over 300,000 historical documents from the State Library and Archives holdings such as government records, family papers, maps, diaries, and land records.

== See also ==
- Florida Photographic Collection
- State Library and Archives of Florida
