= The Tampa Tribune =

Daily newspaper published in Tampa, Florida (1895–2016)

- The October 16, 2008, front page of The Tampa Tribune
- Type: Daily newspaper
- Format: Broadsheet
- Owner(s): Tampa Media Group, Inc.
- Founded: 1895; 131 years ago
- Ceased publication: 2016
- Headquarters: 202 South Parker Street; Tampa, Florida, U.S. 33606
- Circulation: 226,990 (as of 2007)
- ISSN: 1042-3761

The Tampa Tribune was a daily newspaper published in Tampa, Florida. Along with the competing Tampa Bay Times, the Tampa Tribune was one of two major newspapers published in the Tampa Bay area.

The newspaper also published a St. Petersburg Tribune edition, sold and distributed in Pinellas County. It published a Sunday magazine, Florida Accent, during the 1960s and 1970s. The Tampa Tribune also operated Highlands Today, a daily newspaper in Sebring. The Tribune stopped publishing the Hernando Today, which was located in Brooksville, on December 1, 2014, citing "a tough newspaper advertising climate."

On May 3, 2016, the Tampa Bay Times announced that it had acquired the Tribune, and was combining the Times and Tribune's operations, ending publication of the Tribune.

== History ==
Daily publication of the Tribune started in 1895 when Wallace Stovall upgraded printing from once a week.

In 1927, newspaper mogul John Stewart Bryan, of Virginia, and his business partner Samuel Emory Thomason, previously a vice-president with the Chicago Tribune, purchased The Tampa Tribune for $900,000.

The Tampa Tribune Publishing company grew to include the Tampa Tribune, the Tampa Times, TBO.com, TampaBayOnline.com, WFLA radio, and WFLA-TV.

In 1966, the Tampa Tribune, along with sister properties WFLA-AM-FM-TV, was purchased by Richmond Newspapers, becoming Media General in 1969. Since 2000, the Tribune partnered with WFLA-TV and TBO.com in a converged arrangement, all connected with one another under owner Media General. The large media complex is located on Parker Street in Downtown Tampa. The Tribune was a flagship newspaper under the Media General banner until it was sold in 2012.

Executive editor Janet Coats left the paper in December 2009 and was not replaced until May 17, 2012, when managing editor Richard "Duke" Maas was promoted to executive editor.

On May 17, 2012, it was announced that investment company Berkshire Hathaway would be acquiring Media General's newspaper division; the purchase did not include the Tribune or its associated regional papers, which were being retained by Media General. No reason was given as to why Media General was retaining the Tribune, but there was speculation that the paper would be sold to another party, such as Halifax Media Group (which owns several papers in Florida) or a completely different owner, or that the paper would merge with the Tampa Bay Times. In October 2012, The Tampa Tribune and its associated print and digital products were acquired by Tampa Media Group, Inc., a new company formed by Revolution Capital Group.

On May 3, 2016, the Tampa Bay Times announced that it had acquired the Tribune, and was combining the Times and Tribune's operations, ending publication of the Tribune. The acquisition also includes Highlands Today, weekly newspaper The Suncoast News, and weekly Spanish-language newspaper Centro; all of these will continue publishing under Times' ownership. The Tampa Tribune name will be repurposed as a neighborhood news section of the Times.

== Tampa Daily Times trademark ==
In 1958, the Tribune acquired Tampa's struggling evening newspaper, the Tampa Daily Times. The Tribune published the paper as The Tampa Times until 1982. From then until the Tribune closed down, the Tribune displayed the logo for The Tampa Times in the masthead on the front section. This was part of an effort by the Tribune to keep its trademark on the Tampa Times name, and to avoid confusion with the then-St. Petersburg Times, which long published a Tampa edition. In 2006, it was decided in a lawsuit that the Tribune could keep its exclusive use of the Tampa Times name, but only for five years. This exclusivity ended at the end of 2011, allowing the St. Petersburg Times to rename itself the Tampa Bay Times, effective January 1, 2012. The decision did not restrict the use of The Tampa Times name by the Tribune after the expiration of exclusivity.

== Awards ==
The Tampa Tribune won a Pulitzer Prize in 1966 for local investigative specialized reporting. The award went to John Anthony Frasca for his "investigation and reporting of two robberies that resulted in the freeing of an innocent man."

== See also ==
- List of newspapers in Florida
