= WSMR (FM) =

Classical radio station in Sarasota, Florida

- Sarasota, Florida; United States
- Broadcast area: Sarasota-Bradenton, Florida, Tampa Bay Area
- Frequency: 89.1 MHz
- Branding: Classical WSMR

Programming
- Format: Classical music

Ownership
- Owner: University of South Florida; (University of South Florida Board of Trustees)
- Sister stations: WUSF

History
- First air date: February 4, 1993
- Former call signs: WAYG (1991–1996)

Technical information
- Licensing authority: FCC
- Facility ID: 64255
- Class: C1
- ERP: 54,000 watts
- HAAT: 135 meters (443 ft)
- Transmitter coordinates: 27°9′4.2″N 82°27′50.3″W
- Translators: 103.9 W280DW (Tampa, relays WUSF-HD2)
- Repeater: 89.7 WUSF-HD2 (Tampa)

Links
- Public license information: Public file; LMS
- Webcast: Listen live
- Website: www.wsmr.org

WSMR (89.1 FM) is a non-commercial radio station licensed to Sarasota, Florida, United States. It is owned by the University of South Florida and programs a classical music format. WSMR broadcasts from a transmitter located near the intersection of US 41 and SR 681 in Laurel. Its programming is repeated on translator W280DW 103.9 FM in Tampa, from a 250 watt transmitter on the USF main campus. WSMR's programming can also be heard around the Tampa Bay Area on the second HD Radio channel of 89.7 WUSF.

== History ==
WSMR began broadcasting as WAYG on February 4, 1993. It was part of the WayFM Network and aired a Christian contemporary hit radio format simulcast from WAYJ in Fort Myers. The station never generated sufficient listener support among Sarasota's older population and closed in August 1996. That November, it returned to the air as WSMR under the ownership of Northwestern College of Roseville, Minnesota. During most of its existence under Northwestern College, the station carried a Christian adult contemporary format and was known as Life 89.1.

On July 30, 2010, Northwestern College announced that the station would cease broadcasting on August 4 at 5 pm. Northwestern College held a STA to dismantle its current tower and broadcast on another station's auxiliary tower at a lesser power. A loss of donations from listeners and businesses during the recession has led Northwestern College to close WSMR, even though the special temporary authority (STA) filed with the Federal Communications Commission (FCC) said that the station would continue broadcasting.

On the day of WSMR's closure, the University of South Florida (USF) announced its intention to acquire WSMR, with plans to change the station's format to classical music, while reimaging Tampa's WUSF FM as a station carrying National Public Radio-based talk programming by day and jazz at night. USF moved the station slightly closer to the Tampa Bay area; WSMR's coverage is primarily the Sarasota-Bradenton area. However, the station's programming is also heard on WUSF-HD2. WUSF's main frequency began broadcasting an NPR News and talk schedule on September 15, 2010; however, WSMR failed to launch on that date as previously announced. Various explanations were offered by WUSF, including delays due to FCC approval, and an undefined technical issue relating to another frequency assigned to "first responders" at the same tower site.

The station's sale to USF also included W280DW, to carry WSMR's new classical signal in Tampa.

Two weeks after the failed launch of classical replacement WSMR, station management came under public scrutiny for neglecting to perform due diligence regarding the purchase of the WSMR transmitter. According to a Bradenton Herald article:

Arthur Doak, an engineer for the FCC, said there was no record of WUSF or Northwestern College conducting an inspection on the tower but said stations are entitled to a review of tower sites.

"If the buyer wanted it done to protect themselves, certainly they could," Doak said. "That's between the buyer and the seller."

On October 25, 2010, WSMR resumed broadcasting, but temporarily at 5,000 watts on a Sarasota-area tower rented from Clear Channel Communications. After several weeks, full-power service resumed.

WSMR's main studios in Sarasota were completed in early 2011. The studio is used for broadcasting, as well as live and recorded local performances. The station is dedicated to presenting classical music in recorded and live performances and markets itself as Florida's Classical Station. It is available on-line as well around the world.
