= Longboat Observer =

Newspaper in Longboat Key, Florida, US

- Type: Weekly newspaper
- Format: Tabloid
- Owner(s): Observer Media Group
- Founder(s): Ralph Hunter; Claire Hunter
- President: Emily Walsh
- Editor-in-chief: Kat Wingert
- Founded: 1978
- Headquarters: Sarasota, Florida
- Circulation: 10,573
- OCLC number: 31467412
- Website: YourObserver.com

The Longboat Observer is an American free newspaper published by Observer Media Group. It is distributed primarily in Longboat Key, Florida as well as other parts of the Sarasota-Bradenton area. It was founded and first published by Ralph and Claire Hunter in 1978.

== History ==
The Longboat Observer was founded in 1978 by Claire and Ralph Hunter. The first issue was published July 28, 1978 in seven copies and had only four pages. The 1980s saw the paper grow in step with a real estate boom in the area and the Hunters added staff.

In 1995, Matt and Lisa Walsh, with the assistance of a small group of investors including Lisa's parents, bought Longboat Observer to form the private company which became Observer Media Group (OMG).

OMG is headquartered in Sarasota, Florida, and Longboat Observer is now part of a family of seven community and business publications in Florida, some of which were founded by the Walshes and OMG, others were established papers which were acquired by OMG. Most of them utilize the corporate brand of "Observer" in the title which came from Longboat Observer.

In 2016, Emily Walsh was named publisher for the Longboat Observer and sister-papers East County Observer, Siesta Key Observer, and Sarasota Observer. Ms. Walsh was named president in 2021.

As of 2024, the Longboat Observer has a circulation of 10,573 and is distributed weekly on Thursdays. The Longboat Key Historical Museum maintains a collection of printed and bound copies of Longboat Observer going back to 1978.
