= Sun Coast Media Group =

Sun Coast Media Group, or "The Sun", is a Florida-based corporation that publishes several Florida local newspapers and owns printing facilities in Florida.

The Group was established in 1977 with purchase of The Venice Gondolier by Derek Dunn-Rankin, who died in 2016. After Dunn-Rankin's death, his son, David, became the company's President. Among the titles acquired since the initial purchase have been the Polk County News and Democrat, the Highland News Sun, the Arcadian, the North Port Sun, the Englewood Sun, and the Charlotte Sun. The Group also includes a real estate magazine.

With respect to re-printing of National and World News, the Group relied initially on the Associated Press, switched to Gannett (via USA Today), then in 2017 established their own wire service relying heavily on the Associated Press.

The Group has established printing facilities in Venice and Port Charlotte, Florida, which are used for printing their own and more than 100 additional newspapers. In conjunction with their printing capacity, the Group has also established The Sun Coast Press subsidiary, employing 300 or more people.

The Charlotte Sun is considered the Group's flagship publication, with the largest circulation and accolades around receiving a Pulitzer Prize in 2016. Circulation for the Group's properties was in the range of 30,000 to 40,000 in the late 2010s.
