= The News-Press =

Daily broadsheet newspaper located in Fort Myers, Florida

- Type: Daily newspaper
- Format: Broadsheet
- Owner: USA Today Co.
- Publisher: William Barker
- Editor: Cindy McCurry-Ross
- Founded: 1884
- Headquarters: 4415 Metro Parkway; Fort Myers, Florida 33916
- Circulation: 9,850 Average print circulation 1,238 Digital Subscribers
- Website: news-press.com

The News-Press is a daily broadsheet newspaper located in Fort Myers, Florida, serving primarily Lee County, as well as parts of Hendry, Collier, and Charlotte Counties.

The paper publishes several editions of its "Local & State" (metro) section for suburban communities, including Bonita Springs, Cape Coral, Lehigh Acres, North Fort Myers, and South Fort Myers. Further, special sections are published on the paper's Web site, including "Education", "Environment", and "Growth/Development".

The News-Press is owned by the Virginia-based USA Today Co., which has owned it since 1971. The News-Press is printed in Stuart, FL along with the Naples Daily News. It has been printed there since May 2021.
