= Highlands Today =

Defunct newspaper in Sebring, Florida

- Front page of Highlands Today, April 20, 2007
- Type: Daily newspaper
- Format: Broadsheet
- Owner: Times Publishing Company
- Ceased publication: Sept. 18, 2016
- Headquarters: Sebring, Florida
- Website: highlandstoday.com

Highlands Today was a newspaper published in Sebring, Florida. It was associated with the Tampa Bay Times; copies of the Times distributed in Highlands County, Florida included the supplement, which focused on issues relevant to Sebring, Avon Park, Lake Placid, and other communities within the county.

The newspaper was previously associated with The Tampa Tribune until that paper was acquired by the Times Publishing Company, the publisher of the Times, in May 2016. After its acquisition, the Tribune was immediately folded and its associated newspapers, including Highlands Today, became publications of the Times.

On August 19, 2016, it was announced that the Tampa Bay Times had sold Highlands Today to Sun Coast Media Group, owners of Highlands Today's competitor, the Highlands News-Sun. Sun Coast Media Group absorbed Highlands Today's resources and merged it into its own paper, completing the process on September 18, 2016, after Highlands Today published its final edition.
