= WEDQ =

Television station in Tampa, Florida

- Tampa–St. Petersburg, Florida; United States
- City: Tampa, Florida
- Channels: Digital: 13 (VHF), shared with WEDU; Virtual: 3.4
- Branding: WEDQ PBS

Programming
- Affiliations: 3.4: PBS; 3.5: PBS Kids; 3.6: Create

Ownership
- Owner: Florida West Coast Public Broadcasting, Inc.
- Sister stations: WEDU

History
- First air date: September 11, 1966
- Former call signs: WUSF-TV (1966–2017)
- Former channel numbers: Analog: 16 (UHF, 1966–2009); Digital: 34 (UHF, 2004–2017); Virtual: 16 (until 2017)
- Former affiliations: NET (1966–1970)

Technical information
- Licensing authority: FCC
- Facility ID: 69338
- ERP: 25 kW; 38 kW (CP)
- HAAT: 470.9 m (1,545 ft); 471.9 m (1,548 ft) (CP)
- Transmitter coordinates: 27°50′51.5″N 82°15′49.4″W

Links
- Public license information: Public file; LMS

WEDQ (channel 3.4) is a secondary PBS member television station licensed to Tampa, Florida, United States, serving the Tampa Bay area. It is owned by Florida West Coast Public Broadcasting alongside primary PBS member WEDU (channel 3). The two stations share studios at the Berkman Family Broadcast Center on North Boulevard in Tampa and transmitter facilities in Riverview, Florida.

For most of its history, this license was WUSF-TV (channel 16), which was built by the University of South Florida (USF) in 1966. WUSF served as a secondary educational and public TV station for the Tampa Bay area with an emphasis on college telecourses and how-to programming, with WEDU providing primary PBS service and children's programs. It broadcast from studios on the USF campus, first in the library basement and later in dedicated facilities completed in 2001. Relations between WEDU and WUSF-TV were usually cooperative but occasionally deteriorated.

In 2015, the Federal Communications Commission opened an opportunity for broadcast stations to surrender their spectrum in a reverse auction to clear frequencies for wireless service. The USF Board of Trustees voted to include channel 16 in the auction; in the preceding years, it had routinely lost money, and trustees were skeptical of the continued value of a TV station with a growth in new media technologies. The university sold its spectrum for $18.8 million and ceased broadcasting on October 15, 2017. The broadcast license remained and was sold to Florida West Coast Public Broadcasting, which moved it onto the same channel as WEDU and incorporated WUSF-TV's former subchannels and programming into its offerings as WEDQ.

== WUSF-TV ==
=== Early years ===
In 1962, the Florida Educational Television Commission wrote to the Federal Communications Commission (FCC) to recommend a second non-commercial reserved channel be allocated to Tampa. It suggested that channel 22 be relocated from Lakeland for use in Tampa, where the University of South Florida (USF) already had money set aside to start an educational TV station. The FCC moved channel 22 to Tampa the next year, but it did not reserve the channel, leaving it open for a potential commercial TV station. That action frustrated the university and others in educational television. An editorial in the St. Petersburg Times shared this frustration and called on the commission to reconsider, and at least one applicant, Tampa Bay Television, expressed interest in activating channel 22 as a commercial station. Representatives of the state commission conferred with FCC chairman E. William Henry in January 1964 to plead their case. Meanwhile, in February 1964, USF completed its television studio for the purpose of distributing material on the college's in-house closed-circuit system; the university joined with Tampa's existing noncommercial station, WEDU (channel 3), to propose a joint tower to house the two TV stations.

The FCC's assignment of channel 16 as a second reserved channel to Tampa solved the channel 22 problem and allowed USF to refile its application for the station. The university joined with the state commission and the Florida Board of Control in September 1964 to apply for grant funding. On February 23, 1965, the money and the construction permit were each granted, allowing the university to begin building channel 16. Tower erection began in September and was finished by May 1966.

WUSF-TV began broadcasting on September 11, 1966. It broadcast for five hours a day on weekdays only, with a mix of reruns of older commercial shows, USF courses, two children's programs, and several local programs. Initially, WUSF-TV had no network programming, as WEDU was the local station for National Educational Television (NET). Instead, it focused on providing local shows and college-level telecourses; during the day, the station was off the air while the studios were in use to produce closed-circuit programs. Another early local presentation was a Spanish-language news and public affairs program Enfoque (In Focus)—the only such program in Florida outside of Miami.

=== Expanded programming ===
While WUSF-TV aimed to complement WEDU, the arrival of PBS in 1970 as NET's replacement triggered acrimony between the two stations. Channel 16 sought parity and the ability to simulcast PBS programs, and it indicated a desire to begin fundraising in the community, which irked WEDU officials fearing a dilution of viewer support and audience. A lobbying battle came to a fever pitch in January 1971, when leaders from the Corporation for Public Broadcasting (CPB) and the Florida Department of Education and several influential state legislators forced leaders of WEDU and WUSF-TV into a motel room to work out their differences. The consensus that emerged allowed WUSF-TV to become a PBS station, but the stations agreed not to simulcast programs. It encouraged channel 16 to develop an alternative lineup to WEDU's programs for schools and children and made it the primary source of local evening programming. WUSF-TV also began its conversion to color programming in 1971. The next year, the station started Your Open University, a series of broadcast courses for credit. In 1974, it completed the conversion to local color with the purchase of four new cameras, began broadcasting seven days a week, and extended its broadcast day to start at 2:30 p.m., aided by a change in funding procedures from the CPB. The schedule was further lengthened in 1976 when WUSF-TV moved its sign-on to 10 a.m., hoping to bring PBS programs to women and elderly audiences that previously could not see them. A satellite dish was built on the USF campus in 1977, allowing WUSF and WEDU to make use of satellite delivery to broaden their mix of PBS programming.

The University of South Florida expanded its involvement in public TV broadcasting in 1983, when it completed construction of WSFP-TV (channel 30) in Fort Myers. The station started as a repeater of WUSF-TV and began producing programs for Southwest Florida in 1988. On July 1, 1996, as part of the transition of USF's Fort Myers operations into Florida Gulf Coast University, the new university became the licensee of the station, which changed its call sign to WGCU.

=== New studios and funding cuts ===
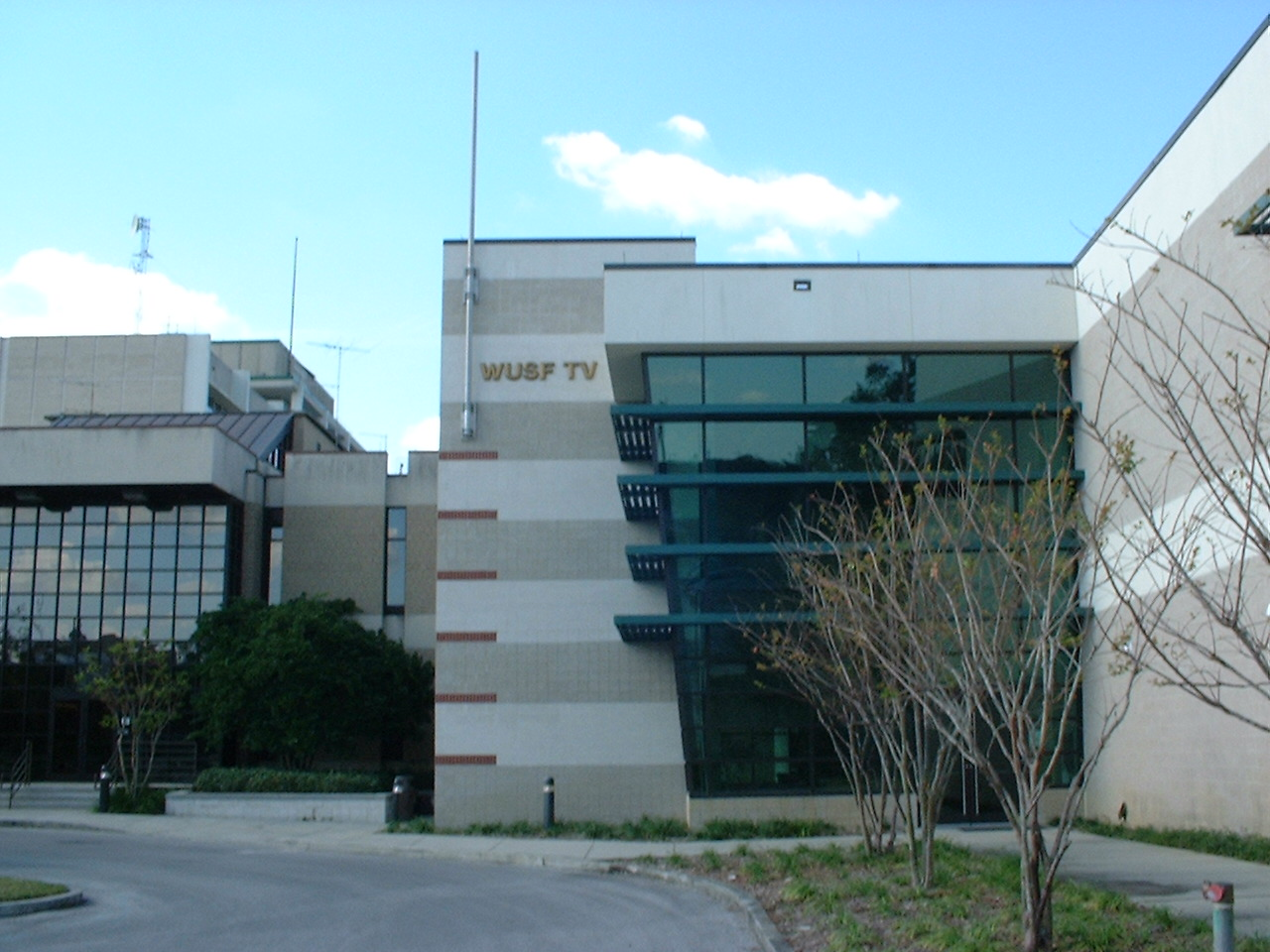
The WUSF-TV studios in Tampa, built in 2001

Since its sign-on, WUSF-TV had broadcast from the basement of the USF library, occupying space once utilized by the book bindery. Beginning in the early 1980s, the university pursued funding to build a new studio facility. The basement site became inadequate as the station grew, and the forthcoming conversion to digital television spurred the state government and USF to take action. In 1998, the state Department of Education allocated $6 million for construction of a new, 18,000-square-foot (1,700 m^{2}) facility next to the WUSF radio studios, and the state supplied another $2 million to pay for digital equipment. The new studios opened in 2001, providing more on-campus visibility. In 2002, WUSF radio and television came under a single general manager, JoAnn Urofsky. Under Urofsky, the station launched its digital signal on July 1, 2004; its three new subchannels featured educational content from the Annenberg/CPB Channel, PBS You, and the Florida Knowledge Network. The digital signal on channel 34 became the only signal on April 16, 2009, when the analog signal was turned off two months before the final digital transition date.

In the late 2000s, the relationship between WEDU and WUSF, which had remained cordial for decades, deteriorated again. One notable incident involved WUSF selling videos of The Lawrence Welk Show during a pledge drive, hours before Welk aired regularly on WEDU. WUSF-TV management took umbrage at PBS designating channel 16 a secondary station, saying their increased reliance on local programming led to the unfavorable label from PBS. Bright House Networks, the primary cable provider in the Tampa Bay area, exacerbated the strife by exercising a contract in its clause with PBS stations and demoting WUSF-TV, but not WEDU, to a tier where not all subscribers could see it. The relationship was repaired again a year later, when managers of both stations agreed to collaborate on programming as well as a jointly produced fundraising night. A statewide defunding of public media in 2011, a consequence of governor Rick Scott's decision to veto a funding package, left the station unable to produce local programming that was not paid for by a grant.

== WEDQ ==
=== Incentive auction sale ===
On October 13, 2015, trustees of the University of South Florida voted to explore placing WUSF-TV into the FCC's spectrum incentive auction in 2016, a move that could lead to the station sharing a channel with another area station, moving its signal to a VHF channel, or ceasing operations altogether. The station had lost money in fiscal years 2013, 2014, and 2015, and its cash flow was negative for fiscal year 2016; in contrast, WUSF radio was making money. Trustees justified the decision by highlighting that the station had little involvement with the academic life of the university and little academic programming on its air. Ralph Wilcox, the provost of the university, noted in emails to other trustees that he lacked faith in the future of a linear TV station given an explosion in digital media platforms. Despite the uncertainty over WUSF-TV's future, channel 16 entered into a promotional partnership with the Tampa Bay Rays baseball team, exceeded fundraising goals, and gave staff raises; it hired veteran Tampa TV anchor Denise White to host a new weekly show about university activities, University Beat.

The incentive auction closed in February 2017, and USF sold the spectrum of WUSF-TV for $18.8 million. The university announced that the station would then cease operations on a to-be-determined date, later confirmed as October 15. Fifteen employees lost their jobs, though many had time to find work elsewhere.

WUSF-TV management had been in talks with their counterparts at WEDU since 2015 about planning to maintain services in the event that the station left the air. On October 8, it was announced that WUSF-TV had entered into a channel sharing agreement with WEDU, enabling the station to continue operations. WUSF-TV's license was transferred to WEDU's owner, Florida West Coast Public Broadcasting; the transfer was completed on January 24, 2018. With the shutdown on October 15, WEDU picked up the PBS Kids and Create subchannels previously carried by WUSF-TV as well as programs formerly on channel 16's lineup.

In 2020, the USF Board of Trustees approved the renovation of the studio facilities left by WUSF-TV on the campus into a center for talent development within the Muma College of Business, which opened in 2022.

== Subchannels ==
WEDU and WEDQ are broadcast from a transmitter facility in Riverview.

Subchannels of WEDU and WEDQ
License	Subchannel	Res.	Short name	Programming
WEDU	3.1	1080i	WEDU-HD	PBS
WEDU	3.2	480i	WEDU WD	World Channel
WEDU	3.3	480i	WEDUNHK	NHK World-Japan
WEDQ	3.4	720p	WEDQ	PBS
WEDQ	3.5	480i	WEDQK	PBS Kids
WEDQ	3.6	480i	WEDU CR	Create
