= State Library and Archives of Florida =

Heritage institution

Coordinates: 30.438340°N 84.284956°W

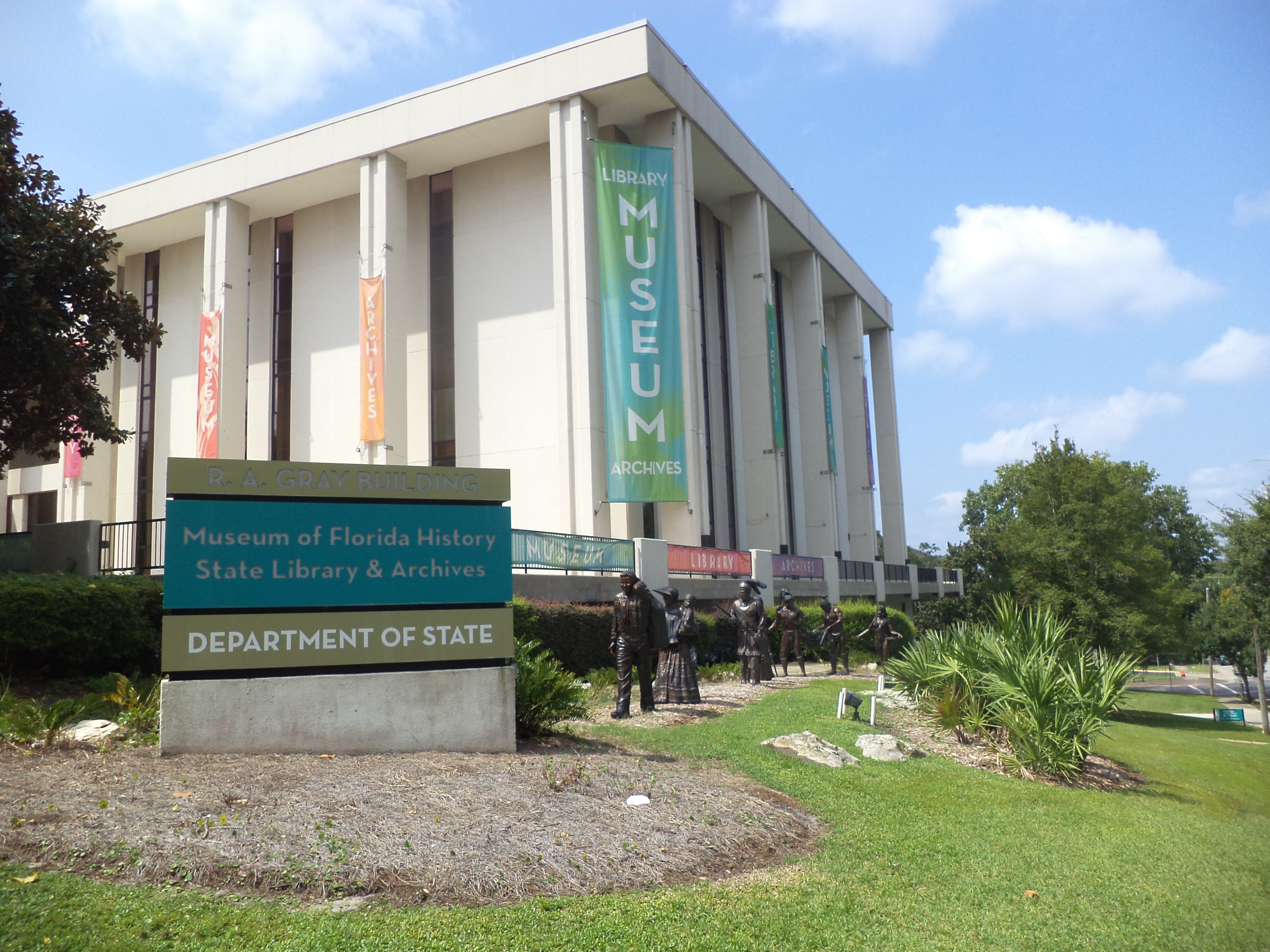
The R.A. Gray Building, which also houses the Museum of Florida History and the Florida Department of State

The State Library and Archives of Florida is a government library with historically significant records of Florida such as private manuscripts and correspondence, local government records, photographs, maps, film clips, and materials that complement the official state records and Florida history.

Located at the R.A. Gray Building on 500 South Bronough Street in Tallahassee, Florida, Florida's capital, it is mandated by state law.

Many photos from the Florida Photographic Collection are used frequently for articles on Wikipedia and assist users in describing events in Florida history. A selection of archival items from the State Library and Archives are available through the digital outreach program Florida Memory.

== History ==
The Spanish kept records in Florida.

Shortly after its admission as a state in 1845, the Florida legislature identified the vital and crucial need to preserve, protect, and collect documents about the history of Florida. During that same legislative session, a statute was enacted naming the "Secretary of State" responsible for the care, collection, organization, and display of all books and maps belonging to the state be collected together. It was also said in the statute that all such documents be cataloged as thoroughly as possible. However, this task was neglected, and as a result, the library and archives suffered.

According to the Florida Historical Society's article during the administration of Dr. Jno. L. Crawford, "a space in the upper corridor of the Capitol was partitioned off and furnished with shelving, and a large number of the (apparently) most valuable of the books, maps, etc., was deposited there; and many such occupied shelves are in the office of the Secretary".

When the Capital was remodeled in 1902, the commissioners intended to create space to accommodate the growing library but failed to do so. H. Clay Crawford, Secretary of State at the time, placed shelving on the either side of the basement walls and moved several books unarranged and uncatalogued where they were left in the dusty damp air. It is undetermined just how many documents of historical value lay untouched and neglected in the basement of the State Library, and it was not until some sixty years later that the library flourished as a historical point of reference for its patrons.

The State Library prospered under William Thomas Cash's leadership. Cash had been a teacher and experience working in the Florida House of Representatives and the Florida Senate. He wrote several articles and books about Florida history. He would be appointed to be State Librarian in 1927. At this time the. State Library was housed in the basement of the Capital building. Later in 1949, it would be moved to the Florida Supreme Court building once construction was complete. Cash would help grow the collection from 1,500 uncatalogued volumes to over 50,000 volumes, with a particular interest in rare books and volumes. He would eventually retire from the State Library in 1951.

The State Librarian of Florida is Amy L. Johnson, appointed in 2015. Previous State Librarians were Cecil Beach, 1971- 1977; Barratt Wilkins, 1977–2003; and Judith A. Ring, 2003–2015.

The State Library and Archives of Florida also provides access to thousands of historical photographs, documents, and recordings through the Florida Memory digital archive.

=== State Librarians of Florida ===
- William Thomas Cash from 1927–1951
- Dr. Dorothy Dodd from 1951–1965
- Cecil Beach from 1971–1977
- Barratt Wilkins from 1977–2003
- Judith A. Ring 2003–2015
- Amy L. Johnson 2015-present

== Holdings ==
- State Government Records
- Local Government Records
- Manuscripts (Non-Government Records)
- Florida Photographic Collection
- Genealogical Collection
- Legislative Acts Committee Records
- Civil War Records
- Military Service & Pension Records
- Florida Folklife Collection

== See also ==
- Florida Historical Society
- Florida Memory Program
- Florida Photographic Collection
- List of libraries in the United States
- Museum of Florida History
- W.T. Cash
