= WUSF (FM) =

- Tampa, Florida; United States
- Broadcast area: Tampa Bay area
- Frequency: 89.7 MHz (HD Radio)
- Branding: WUSF News

Programming
- Format: Public Radio and talk
- Subchannels: HD2: Classical music (WSMR)
- Affiliations: NPR; APM; PRX; BBC World Service

Ownership
- Owner: University of South Florida
- Sister stations: WSMR

History
- First air date: September 1963
- Call sign meaning: University of South Florida

Technical information
- Licensing authority: FCC
- Facility ID: 69122
- Class: C1
- ERP: 69,000 watts
- HAAT: 295 meters (968 ft)
- Transmitter coordinates: 27°50′53″N 82°15′48″W
- Translator: HD2: 103.9 W280DW (Tampa)

Links
- Public license information: Public file; LMS
- Webcast: Listen live
- Website: www.wusf.org

WUSF (89.7 FM) is a noncommercial educational radio station licensed to Tampa, Florida, United States, the primary NPR member for the Tampa Bay area. Owned by the University of South Florida (USF), WUSF's format features news and talk programming 24 hours a day, 7 days a week, provided by NPR and other public radio networks. The studios and offices are on East Fowler Avenue in Tampa, inside room number 101 of the WRB building on the USF campus.

WUSF's transmitter is sited on Boyette Road at Mosaic Drive in Riverview, Florida. WUSF broadcasts in HD Radio: the HD2 digital subchannel simulcasts WSMR's classical music format, which is fed over low-power FM translator W280DW at 103.9 MHz.

== History ==
WUSF signed on the air in September 1963, seven years after USF's founding in 1956. It joined NPR in 1976. It was the first public radio station in the country-—and the first station of any kind in Florida-—to broadcast using HD radio technology.

In 2010, USF acquired Christian radio station WSMR (89.1 MHz) in Sarasota. WSMR was previously owned by Northwestern College of Roseville, Minnesota. At the time, WUSF aired a mix of news and information shows along with classical music. USF planned to change WSMR's format to classical music, available around the clock. WSMR inherited the classical music library of WUSF. With WSMR becoming a full-time classical station, WUSF could switch to a format of NPR news along with nighttime jazz programming. WSMR's coverage area is mainly in the Sarasota-Bradenton area, but the station's programming would also be available online and on WUSF's HD2 digital subchannel.

WUSF's format was scheduled to be changed on September 15, 2010. But its relaunch was delayed due to technical problems. WSMR's sale to USF also included FM translator station W280DW, a repeater of WSMR, that broadcasts on 103.9 MHz. It is based in Brandon and serves Pasco and northern Hillsborough counties. The translator continued rebroadcasting WSMR, with its new classical music format.

Two weeks after the failed launch of classical replacement WSMR, station management came under public scrutiny. Critics thought the staff neglected to perform due diligence regarding the purchase of the WSMR transmitter. According to an article in the Bradenton Herald:

Arthur Doak, an engineer for the FCC, said there was no record of WUSF or Northwestern College conducting an inspection on the tower but said stations are entitled to a review of tower sites.
“If the buyer wanted it done to protect themselves, certainly they could,” Doak said. “That’s between the buyer and the seller.”

On October 20, 2022, WUSF announced that it would drop jazz programming later that month. It would have a schedule of all spoken-word programming, with news, information and talk shows, along with the BBC World Service airing overnight. In 2023, WUSF launched its online jazz programming.

== See also ==
- List of jazz radio stations in the United States
