= List of Tampa Bay Buccaneers broadcasters =

== Radio ==
The Buccaneers' current flagship radio station is WXTB, 97.9 FM Tampa. Prior to the 2017 season, 620 AM WDAE broadcast the games. A network of Florida radio stations simulcast the games. The play-by-play announcer since 1989 has been Gene Deckerhoff. Former Bucs tight end Dave Moore joined Deckerhoff as analyst for the 2007 season. T. J. Rives works as the sideline reporter.

The current line up of Tampa Bay Buccaneers radio affiliates is:

- Tampa - 97.9 FM WXTB
- Tampa - 96.1 FM WTMP-FM and 1470 AM WMGG (Spanish-language broadcasts)
- Fort Myers - 770 AM and 104.3 FM WBCN
- Hernando County - 1450 AM WWJB
- Miami - 940 AM WINZ
- Orlando - 740 AM and 96.9 FM WYGM
- Polk County - 1230 AM and 107.1 FM WONN
- Space Coast/Treasure Coast - 95.9 FM WROK
- West Palm Beach - 640 AM WMEN

=== Past ===
Broadcast legend and former Green Bay Packers announcer Ray Scott was the play-by-play man for the Bucs' 1976 and 1977 seasons. In 1978, Dick Crippen called the games for the first half of the season while Jim Gallogly did so for the second half. Mark Champion held the position from 1979 to 1988.

Former Buccaneer Hardy Nickerson served as color commentator for one season in 2006, until he signed with the Bears as a linebackers coach on February 23, 2007. Nickerson had replaced Scot Brantley, who was the commentator from 1999 through 2005. Jesse Ventura, the famous professional wrestler, actor, and former governor of Minnesota, was Deckerhoff's partner on the Bucs radio broadcasts for one year and was known for exclaiming "positively Gene", 1990, and former Buc David Logan held that position after Ventura until his death after the 1998 season. Dave Kocourek and Fran Curci were also color commenters for the Buccaneers during their earlier years.

Ronnie Lane previously worked as a sideline reporter.

The Bucs have broadcast on FM radio since signing with Top 40 station 104.7 WRBQ-FM in 1992. The team moved to 99.5 WQYK-FM, in 1994, then to WFUS in 2004.

== Television ==
While regular season and post-season games in the NFL are all broadcast by national television contracts on CBS, FOX, NBC, ESPN and NFL Network, the television broadcasts are for the most part handled by the individual teams. Preseason games not picked up for national broadcast are broadcast, beginning in 2011 on WTSP Channel 10, the Tampa CBS affiliate, after having been on WFLA Channel 8, from 2003 through 2010. WFTV Channel 9 simulcasts the broadcast in the Orlando area. Chris Myers is the play-by-play announcer with Ronde Barber as color commentator. Both Myers and Barber work nationally with FOX Sports. CBS, FOX and NBC games are shown respectively in Tampa Bay on WTSP, WTVT and WFLA, while they are shown respectively in Orlando on WKMG, WOFL and WESH. Monday Night Football games are simulcast locally on WFTS, and NFL Network games can be seen locally on WFLA-TV.

=== Past ===
WTOG Channel 44 was the previous home to Buccaneer preseason games for many years, ending in 2002. Former CBS play-by-play and ESPN golf broadcaster Jim Kelly was the play-by-play announcer for many of those games in the 1980s and early 1990s, and Hank Stram and Joe Namath were commentators. In the early years of the franchise, WTVT-13, then a CBS affiliate, broadcast some Buccaneer preseason games. Sports anchor Andy Hardy handled the play-by-play, and for one game in 1978, his broadcast partner was his friend, Florida State alumni and movie actor Burt Reynolds. Ron Jaworski previously served as color commentator, until he signed with MNF for 2007.

=== By year ===
data not complete

Year	Flagship station	Play-by-play	Analyst(s)	Field reporter(s)	Producer
1976	WTVT	Ray Scott	Andy Hardy
1977	WTVT		Andy Hardy
1978	WTVT	Andy Hardy (2 games)	Steve Spurrier (1 game); Vic Prinzi & Burt Reynolds (1 game)
1979	WTOG	Jay Randolph	Hank Stram
1980	WTOG	Jay Randolph (3 games); Jim Thacker (1 game)	Hank Stram
1981	WTOG	Gary Bender	Hank Stram
1982	WTOG	Gary Bender	Hank Stram
1983	WTOG	Jim Kelly	Hank Stram
1984	WTOG	Jim Kelly	Hank Stram
1985	WTOG	Jim Kelly	Hank Stram
1986	WTOG	Jim Kelly	Hank Stram
1987	WTOG	Jim Kelly (3 games); Tim Brant (1 game)	Hank Stram	Beasley Reece
1988	WTVT	Jim Kelly	Hank Stram	Andy Hardy
1989	WTVT	Andy Hardy	Hank Stram
1990	WTOG	Jim Kelly			Bruce L Copeland
1991	WTOG	Jim Kelly	Joe Namath		Bruce L Copeland
1992	WTOG	Jim Kelly	Cris Collinsworth		Bruce L Copeland
1993	WTOG	Jim Kelly	Cris Collinsworth		Bruce L Copeland
1994	WTOG	Jim Kelly	Cris Collinsworth		Bruce L Copeland
1995	WTOG	Tom Mees	Cris Collinsworth		Bruce L Copeland
1996	WTOG	Tom Mees	Randy Cross		Bruce L Copeland
1997	WTOG	Dave Sims	Beasley Reece	Scot Brantley	Bruce L Copeland
1998	WTOG	Dave Sims	Randy Cross		Bruce L Copeland
1999	WTOG	Dave Sims	Ron Jaworski		Bruce L Copeland
2000	WTOG	Dave Sims	Ron Jaworski		Bruce L Copeland
2001	WTOG	Dave Sims	Ron Jaworski		Bruce L Copeland
2002	WTOG	Dave Sims	Ron Jaworski (2 games); Merrill Hoge (1 game)	Doug Graber	Bruce L Copeland
2003	WFLA	Chris Myers	Ron Jaworski	JP Peterson	Bruce L Copeland
2004	WFLA	Chris Myers	Ron Jaworski; Merrill Hoge (1 game) and Doug Graber	JP Peterson	Bruce L Copeland
2005	WFLA	Chris Myers	Ron Jaworski (2 games); Merrill Hoge (2 games)	JP Peterson	Bruce L Copeland
2006	WFLA	Chris Myers	Ron Jaworski (2 games); Doug Graber (2 games)	JP Peterson	Bruce L Copeland
2007	WFLA	Chris Myers	Charles Davis		Bruce L Copeland
2008	WFLA	Chris Myers	Charles Davis	Dave Reynolds	Bruce L Copeland
2009	WFLA	Chris Myers	John Lynch	Dan Lucas	Bruce L Copeland
2010	WFLA	Chris Myers	John Lynch	Dan Lucas	Bruce L Copeland
2011	WTSP	Chris Myers	John Lynch		Bruce L Copeland
