= The Fabulous Sports Babe =

American sports announcer

The Fabulous Sports Babe was a semi-fictional character who hosted various American sports radio broadcasts. The program, hosted by Tampa Bay area resident Nanci Donnellan, was syndicated across the United States on both ESPN Radio and ESPN2, from 1994 until 2001. She is noteworthy for being one of the few female broadcasters in sports radio, and was one of the first female sports radio call-in hosts in America.

== Broadcast history ==
She first appeared on the radio on WEEI Boston and WLOM Cape Cod. In 1983, she joined Tampa Bay radio station WNSI (1380) and later on at WPLP (570) hosting her own sports show at night, The Nanci Donnellan Show. From 1991 to 1994, she was the weekday afternoon sports talk show host on KJR 950 AM in Seattle before joining ESPN Radio.

In 1994, ESPN Radio picked up Donnellan's show, and made The Fabulous Sports Babe the network's first nationally syndicated weekday programs (prior to this, ESPN Radio only operated on weekends). She also helped launch ESPN2, by having her show simulcast on the channel during the afternoon and late night. Her show was heard in more than 500 cities in the United States and Canada and over 35 countries around the world.

Donnellan left ESPN in 1997 amid acrimonious network response to her autobiography, joining ABC Radio Networks (at the time still independent of ESPN Radio even though both were still owned by The Walt Disney Company) for a brief time. She then waged a successful battle against breast cancer. Donnellan returned home to the Tampa Bay area where she eventually signed on with the relatively new Sports Fan Radio Network that year. Donnellan used the studios of WQYK 1010 AM in St. Pete to produce her show when it was on the Sports Fan Radio Network. She was one of the cornerstones of the network's programming. However, in 2001, shortly before Super Bowl XXXV, Donnellan was fired due to the network's financial troubles (Sports Fan parent company Winstar eventually declared bankruptcy in 2003). As a result, the Sports Fan Network ceased operation. Donnellan's self-imposed hiatus would last four years as she recovered from breast cancer surgery and treatment, which in turn was followed by a double knee replacement, both byproducts of her obesity (at the time, the 5-foot-2-inch tall Donnellan weighed over 300 pounds); Donnellan would later lose over half her body weight in an effort to restore her health. Donnellan had made enough money from her time at ESPN and her book advance to not have to work for several years.

=== Return to broadcasting ===
The Babe returned to radio in 2006 and 2007, making special guest host appearances for on-air personalities in the Tampa Bay Sports Radio Market for WDAE and WHBO, KJR Seattle, WQAM Miami, WDFN Detroit and several fill in stops including several weeks at CBS Free FM in New York City. During her on-air appearances The Babe returned to form and kept the conversations focused on sports and deferred any questions about her personal life by saying "I'm just hanging out, recovering from cancer." She still refers to callers who contact her on cell phones as "a rich guy on a cell phone."

She first appeared on January 8 and 9, 2007, filling in for Scot Brantley on WHBO; Brantley was in Arizona covering the 2007 BCS National Championship Game, in which the Florida Gators had just defeated the Ohio State Buckeyes. She again substituted for Brantley on February 27, and two days later (March 1), filled in for Steve Duemig on WDAE, and continued to fill in on sports and news/talk stations around the country.

On April 10, 2008, Donnellan hosted a one-day stint on WRBZ in Raleigh, North Carolina; Donnellan guest-hosted to celebrate the 10th anniversary of the station switching to the sports radio format; Donnellan's syndicated show was among the first programs aired on the station. The next day, Donnellan returned to radio full-time, and became the co-host, along with Brantley, of Brantley and the Babe on WHBO. The program aired during drive time and could be heard through Internet radio on the station's website. Brantley was laid off from WHBO in January 2009, giving The Babe her own show.

Donnellan suffered a moderate stroke on January 22, 2012; she would eventually recover with no lingering side effects, but the stroke cost her her position on WHBO. On August 1, 2012, The Babe returned as the overnight host at WHFS-FM (the former WSJT), CBS Radio's new FM sports station. The move came ahead of CBS's launch of CBS Sports Radio in January 2013. Donnellan later moved to a daytime time slot. WHFS-FM canceled all of its programs, including hers, as part of an ownership and format change in December 2014.

Her website returned in a blog-style format, supplanting the message it had since 2001, "Gone Fishing." She stopped updating the site in September 2014. She maintains a Twitter account sporadically.

From 2015 to 2018, The Babe hosted a regular podcast through the Radio Influence platform. Her guests included female sportscasting pioneers like Linda Cohn, Suzyn Waldman, Christine Brennan, Jackie MacMullan, and Lesley Visser.

In 2018, The Fabulous Sports Babe was inducted into the National Radio Hall of Fame.

== Personal life and other works ==
Nanci Donnellan was born on June 7, 1948, at Newton-Wellesley Hospital in Newton, Massachusetts. Her father abandoned her as a toddler, and her mother and stepfather frequently moved around as a child, preventing her from establishing long-term friendships; she has also hinted that her family disapproved of her going into the radio business, and she did so partially out of spite. She graduated from Clover Park High School in Lakewood, Washington, in 1966. She attended, but did not graduate from, the University of Tampa and Northeastern University.

Donnellan has made a point of keeping her on-air persona of "the Fabulous Sports Babe" and her real-life wholly separate; she seldom speaks of her personal life out of fear that it would be a distraction (particularly her romantic life, only to admit that she has one, and that although she has not come out herself, she is sympathetic to LGBT causes). Grantland.com interviewed Donnellan, though she only offered brief, repeated and irritated responses to questions about her personal life.

Donnellan currently resides at her St. Pete Beach, Florida, home in Pinellas County. She was a season-ticket holder for the Tampa Bay Rays and can be seen at Tropicana Field from time to time.

With Neal Karlen, she wrote a 1996 book, The Babe in Boyland, in which she discussed men, women, football, goalies, strikes, and clueless sports executives in a unique style.
