= WQYK =

WQYK may refer to:

- WQYK-FM, a radio station (99.5 FM) licensed to serve St. Petersburg, Florida, United States
- WJBR (AM), a radio station (1010 AM) licensed to serve Seffner, Florida, which held the call sign WQYK from 1988 to 2004, and again from 2006 to 2012
- WTIS, a radio station (1110 AM) licensed to serve Tampa, Florida, which held the call sign WQYK from 1970 to 1976
