= WLLD =

Radio station in Lakeland, Florida

- Lakeland, Florida; United States
- Broadcast area: Tampa Bay area
- Frequency: 94.1 MHz (HD Radio)
- Branding: WiLD 94.1

Programming
- Language: English
- Format: Rhythmic contemporary

Ownership
- Owner: Beasley Broadcast Group; (Beasley Media Group Licenses, LLC)
- Sister stations: WJBR; WQYK-FM; WRBQ-FM; WYUU

History
- First air date: August 29, 1965
- Former call signs: WVFM (1965–1988); WEZY (1988–1995); WSJT (1995–2009)
- Call sign meaning: "Wild"

Technical information
- Licensing authority: FCC
- Facility ID: 51987
- Class: C
- ERP: 100,000 watts
- HAAT: 455 meters (1,493 ft)
- Transmitter coordinates: 27.673°N 82.110°W

Links
- Public license information: Public file; LMS
- Webcast: Listen live
- Website: wild941.com

WLLD (94.1 FM) is a commercial radio station licensed to Lakeland, Florida, United States, and serving the Tampa Bay area. Owned by Beasley Broadcast Group, it broadcasts a rhythmic contemporary format. WLLD's studios and offices are located in St. Petersburg, and its transmitter site is located in southeastern Hillsborough County near the "Four Corners" approximately 30 miles southeast of Tampa.

== History ==
=== 94.1 FM ===
94.1 signed on the air on August 29, 1965. The original call sign was WVFM and it and aired an easy listening format. The station played quarter hour sweeps of soft instrumentals, along with some mellow vocals. It was largely automated.

The station was off the air for almost a year between November 1966 and September 1967. The owners didn't want to broadcast while it was in the process of being sold. Easy listening remained the format at WVFM for almost three decades. The station changed its call letters to WEZY in 1988. WEZY later evolved from mostly instrumental beautiful music into soft adult contemporary before changing to smooth jazz WSJT on July 1, 1995.

=== WiLD format ===
The kayfabe line is that the station was started by two friends, Josh and Brian, who had been drinking on Josh's father's boat claiming to have pirated radio waves. The duo bragged of their contraband and irregulated airwaves until they were bought and turned into what is now the station that is broadcasting today. In reality, the station just had a very small budget to start with, often resulting in the same songs playing over and over again. Tone Lōc's "Wild Thing" was the first song the station had played over the air. The fictional friends would claim to have allegiance toward the song during their drunken stupor and continued to play the song repeatedly over the course of days. For the first few days the station was on the air, the song continued to be played in an effort to spark word of mouth attention.

At first, WLLD's musical direction included a balanced mix of hit-driven R&B, Hip-Hop music and Dance tracks, mostly to counter Top 40 rival 93.3 WFLZ-FM, a move that would pay off up until WBTP (WFLZ's sister station) debuted as an urban contemporary station. Today, WLLD's playlist is atypical of most rhythmic stations as it consists of mostly hip-hop and R&B hits, thus is considered to be a rhythmic crossover by "Billboard".

=== Change in frequency ===
WLLD was located on the 98.7 frequency from May 15, 1998, until 5:00 pm on August 19, 2009. At that point, it swapped frequencies with smooth jazz station WSJT. The first song played after the switch was Tone Loc's "Wild Thing", the same first song that was played when WLLD was first launched in 1998 when it was on the 98.7 frequency.

On October 2, 2014, CBS Radio announced that it would trade all of the company's radio stations in Charlotte and Tampa (including WLLD), as well as WIP (AM) in Philadelphia, to the Beasley Broadcast Group. This was in exchange for five stations in Miami and Philadelphia. The swap was completed on December 1, 2014.

=== The Last Damn Show and WiLD Splash ===
The Last Damn Show is an annual concert put on by WLLD. It is put on in late October or early November every year since 1999. The show got its title from being the "last damn show" before the world ended in Y2K; hence, in continuation with the world remaining unscathed. Past performers include Eminem, Lil Wayne, Destiny's Child, P. Diddy, Busta Rhymes, Bubba Sparxxx, Lil Jon and the Eastside Boyz, Trick Daddy, Luke, Ludacris, Kanye West, and Twista among others. The concert was originally held at The St. Pete Times Forum, but is held in other locations, such as Tropicana Field. It has pulled in over 20,000 in attendance almost every year.

On the evening of September 11, 1999, WLLD broadcast the Last Damn Show concert live from 6 to 11 p.m. Because WLLD did not censor profane language and other instances of indecency from the broadcast, the Florida Family Association filed a complaint with the Federal Communications Commission (FCC). The Association wanted the FCC to revoke WLLD's license. The FCC fined WLLD owner Infinity Broadcasting (now the defunct CBS Radio) $7,000 the following year. Infinity filed an appeal, but the FCC denied the appeal in 2004.

WiLDsplash is the annual concert during spring break out on by WLLD in Clearwater Beach. It has been a Bay Area staple since 2001 and pulls crowds in excess of 15,000 fans consistently. Past performers Wiz Khalifa, Snoop Dogg, Busta Rhymes, Bubba Sparxxx, 50 Cent, Sean Paul, Buju Banton, JoJo, 112, Bone Thugs-n-Harmony, Ziggy Marley, Young Jeezy, Stephen & Damian Marley among others.

=== 'WILD' branding ===
WLLD uses the "WiLD" branding in Tampa. The brand has since been trademarked by Clear Channel Communications (now iHeartMedia) years later. Because that happened since the debut of WLLD, this Beasley-owned station is permitted to continue using this moniker.

iHeart owns several "WiLD" stations including KYLD in San Francisco, which has used the "WiLD" branding since its launch in 1992.
