= WWBA =

- Largo, Florida; United States
- Broadcast area: Tampa Bay Area
- Frequency: 820 kHz
- Branding: The Big 8

Programming
- Format: hot talk; sports radio
- Affiliations: Westwood One Sports

Ownership
- Owner: Genesis Communications; (Genesis Communications of Tampa Bay, LLC)
- Sister stations: WHBO; WMGG

History
- First air date: May 29, 1972
- Former call signs: WSST (1972–1985); WRFA (1985–1994); WYTA (1994); WNZE (1994–1996); WZTM (1996–2000); WMGG (2000–2009)
- Call sign meaning: "Tampa Bay"

Technical information
- Licensing authority: FCC
- Facility ID: 51971
- Class: B
- Power: 50,000 watts (day); 1,000 watts (night)
- Transmitter coordinates: 27°54′30.00″N 82°46′51.00″W
- Translators: 96.7 W244EG (Tampa); 98.3 W252DF (Largo)

Links
- Public license information: Public file; LMS
- Webcast: Listen Live
- Website: www.newstalkflorida.com

WWBA (820 kHz) is a commercial AM radio station that airs a hot talk and sports radio format. Licensed to Largo, Florida, it serves the Tampa Bay area. The station is currently owned by Genesis Communications of Tampa Bay, LLC, and is operated by NIA Broadcasting under a local marketing agreement (LMA). Middays, nights and weekends, the station carries the Westwood One Sports. Weekday mornings and for an hour in the afternoon, it runs the syndicated and Florida-based "Bubba The Love Sponge Show."

WWBA is one of two 50,000-watt stations in the Tampa Bay area, along with WJBR (1010 AM). By day, WWBA is powered at 50,000 watts, the maximum for commercial AM stations. As AM 820 is a clear channel frequency reserved for WBAP in Fort Worth, Texas, WWBA reduces power to 1,000 watts at night to avoid interference and uses a directional antenna at all times. WWBA's transmitter is on 8th Avenue SE in Largo.

WWBA is also heard on two FM translator stations: 96.7 W244EG in Tampa and 98.3 W252DF in Largo.

== History ==
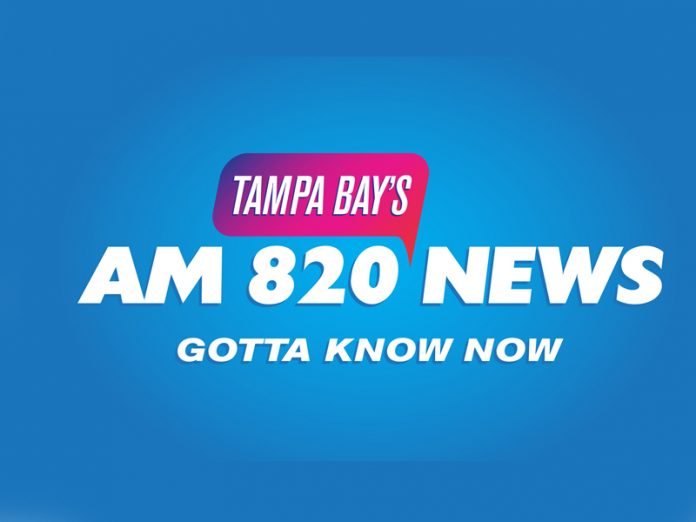
former logo as "AM 820 News"

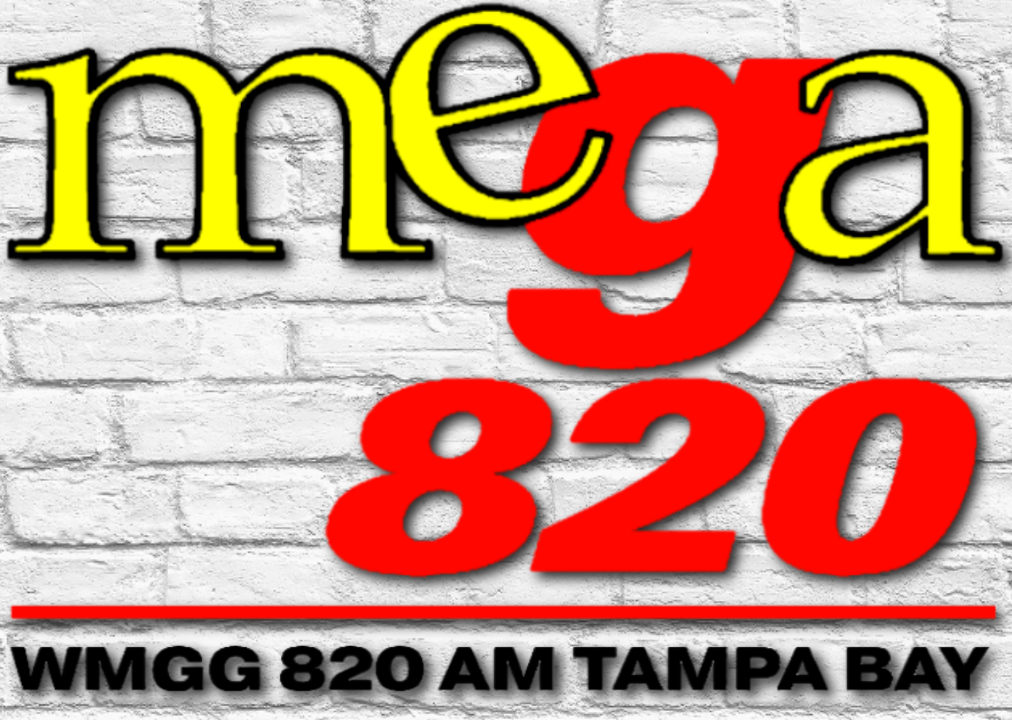
former logo as "Mega 820"

The station went on the air as WSST on May 29, 1972, broadcasting on 800 kHz. It was a daytimer with 250 watts and required to be off the air at night, to protect clear-channel stations CKLW in Windsor, Ontario, Canada and XEROK-AM in Ciudad Juárez, Mexico. Its first format was Southern Gospel music. It later moved to AM 820, as it sought upgrading its daytime signal while providing local nighttime service.

Over the years, it has carried Christian radio, country music, talk radio, and sports radio, as well as a Spanish-language Contemporary Hits format, as "La Preciosa 820".

As a talk station, WWBA once aired more locally-produced programming, but later switched to syndicated conservative talk shows. It was formerly known as "News Talk 820 WWBA". It had been affiliated with ABC News Radio. WWBA also aired a local midday show by Dan Maduri and had local sports hosts filling the morning hours. The station was also home to The Morning Magazine with Mark Larsen, which ended in December 2009. Another local talk show, Dan York's "The Tampa Bay Experience", was canceled in July 2009. In May 2019, afternoon host Chris Ingram was let go. The following month, the rest of the station's on-air announcers were terminated.

On September 29, 2008, WWBA moved its talk programming from 1040 AM to 820 AM, after it was announced that the station's owners, Genesis Communications, would be purchasing 820 AM from Mega Communications. The owners transferred the WWBA call sign to 820 when the sale closed.

On February 13, 2017, WWBA became the new flagship station of the Bubba the Love Sponge Show after WBRN-FM dropped the show the previous month due to a format change. In February 2019, the show left WWBA and moved to 1040 WHBO. Also in February 2019, owner Genesis Communications turned over management of the station to NIA Broadcasting via an LMA.

In June 2019, 820 WWBA changed to automated 1970s-1990s classic country music. The station discontinued local programming. On October 8, 2019, 820 WWBA switched back to a news/talk format. On May 26, 2020, WWBA changed its format from news/talk to hot talk and sports, branded as "The Big 8". The sports programming comes from CBS Sports Radio, and the hot talk is once again from Bubba The Love Sponge.
