= WHBO =

Coordinates: 27°50′50″N 82°46′21″W

- Pinellas Park, Florida; United States
- Broadcast area: Tampa-St. Petersburg-Clearwater
- Frequency: 1040 kHz
- Branding: News Talk 1040

Programming
- Format: Conservative talk
- Network: USA Radio News
- Affiliations: Fox News Radio; NBC News Radio; Westwood One

Ownership
- Owner: Genesis Communications; (Genesis Communications of Tampa Bay, Inc.)
- Sister stations: WWBA

History
- First air date: November 1948; 77 years ago (at 1050)
- Former call signs: WHBO (1948–1991); WMTX (1991–1997); WWBA (1997–2009)
- Former frequencies: 1050 kHz (1948-1980s)
- Call sign meaning: Tampa is within Hillsborough County

Technical information
- Licensing authority: FCC
- Facility ID: 41383
- Class: B
- Power: 3,600 watts day 420 watts night
- Translator: 94.5 W233CV (Egypt Lake)

Links
- Public license information: Public file; LMS
- Webcast: Listen Live
- Website: newsstalkflorida.com

WHBO (1040 AM) is a commercial radio station licensed to Pinellas Park, Florida, and serving the Tampa Bay area. The station is currently owned by Genesis Communications and it airs a conservative talk radio format, branded as "News Talk 1040". Much of the programming comes from Westwood One and Fox News Radio.

WHBO is powered at 3,600 watts non-directional by day. But because AM 1040 is a clear channel frequency reserved for WHO Des Moines, WHBO must reduce power at night and switch to a directional antenna. Its nighttime power is currently 420 watts but it has a Federal Communications Commission (FCC) construction permit to increase nighttime power to 700 watts. Programming is also heard on FM translator W233CV at 94.5 MHz in Gulfport.

== Programming ==
Most of WHBO's schedule is nationally syndicated conservative talk shows: Weekday mornings begin with a news magazine show from Westwood One: America in the Morning. That's followed by The Chris Plante Show, The Jimmy Failla Show, The Bill O'Reilly Show, The Ben Shapiro Show and Red Eye Radio. Weekends feature shows on money, health, law and real estate, as well as repeats of weekday shows.

== History ==
=== Early years ===
WHBO first signed on the air in 1948. At first, it was a daytimer on 1050 kHz, powered at 250 watts and required to go off the air at sunset. Its city of license was Tampa and it was owned by the Sulphur Springs Broadcasting Company.

In the 1960s and 70s, WHBO aired a country music format. In the 1980s and 90s, WHBO was an oldies station, playing hits of the 1950s, ‘60s and ‘70s. WHBO also switched frequency to 1040 kHz in the mid-1980s.

=== Talk radio ===
WHBO switched to a talk radio format in the late-1990s, changing its call sign to WWBA. WWBA aired conservative and libertarian talk shows such as those hosted by Mark Larsen, Dro Silva, Bill O'Reilly, Michael Savage, Laura Ingraham and Kim Komando. While its competitors carried syndicated talk shows most of the day, WHBO had a large number of local hosts.

On September 29, 2008, WWBA moved its programming from 1040 AM to the more powerful 820 AM, which took the call letters WWBA. Listeners to the 1040 AM frequency heard a recorded message every 15 seconds that advised them of the station's frequency move. At 50,000 daytime watts, the 820 AM frequency is one of the state's most powerful radio signals that serves listeners on Florida's entire west coast. On that date, Genesis Communications announced that it reached an agreement to purchase the license from Mega Communications of Tampa, which aired a Spanish-language music format on 820 AM.

=== Sports radio ===
In October 2008, the sports radio format on WHBO moved to 1040 AM, and was simulcast on both 1040 and 1470 AM. The WHBO call letters moved to 1040 AM, with 1470 receiving new call letters WMGG and a Spanish-language talk format. This reunited the WHBO call letters with the 1040 frequency with which it was long associated. WHBO began airing shows from ESPN Radio.

Genesis Communications announced on June 22, 2012, that WHBO would drop ESPN on October 1, 2012, in favor of NBC Sports Radio. AM 620 WDAE became the new ESPN affiliate in Tampa. Some WHBO shows were also simulcast in Greater Orlando on sister station WHOO 1080 AM. In August 2018, WHOO was sold to Catholic broadcasters, with the simulcast ended.

=== Previous sports programming ===
WHBO carried two local sports shows on weekdays, Tampa Bay Sports This Morning and Rock Riley in afternoons. Weekday syndicated programming included Jim Rome, Clay Travis, Amani Toomer and Rich Eisen.

WHBO was the Tampa Bay affiliate of the Florida State University football and men's basketball radio networks. The station also aired University of Miami football games when FSU is not playing. WHBO is an affiliate of the Performance Racing Network, airing the Coca-Cola 600 and other car races during the year.

During the 2006 NFL season, the station aired the "Monday Morning Quarterback" show on Mondays from 8:00 AM to 9:00 AM with John Kaleo, which focused on the Tampa Bay Buccaneers, NCAA football around the state of Florida, and local high school football games of interest. WHBO had been an affiliate of NBC Sports Radio. But at the end of 2018, NBC Sports Radio greatly reduced its schedule of shows. WHBO added shows from Fox Sports Radio and CBS Sports Radio to its line-up.

=== Talk 1040 ===
The station began carrying the syndicated Bubba the Love Sponge show on weekday mornings on February 12, 2019, while keeping its sports schedule the rest of the day.

On May 26, 2020, WHBO changed its format from sports to conservative talk, branded as "Talk 1040". It added talk shows from the Westwood One and Fox News Talk networks.

=== Tower collapse ===
In August 2006, tower number one of the three WHBO towers sustained a "catastrophic failure." The guy-wires were clipped during construction in the neighborhood where the three towers are located. WHBO began operating under Special Temporary Authority. Due to litigation issues over land use, and other factors, WHBO may be forced to find a new transmitter site.

The center tower (tower #2) collapsed. WHBO only used two of the three original towers, and built a new third tower.
