= WMGG =

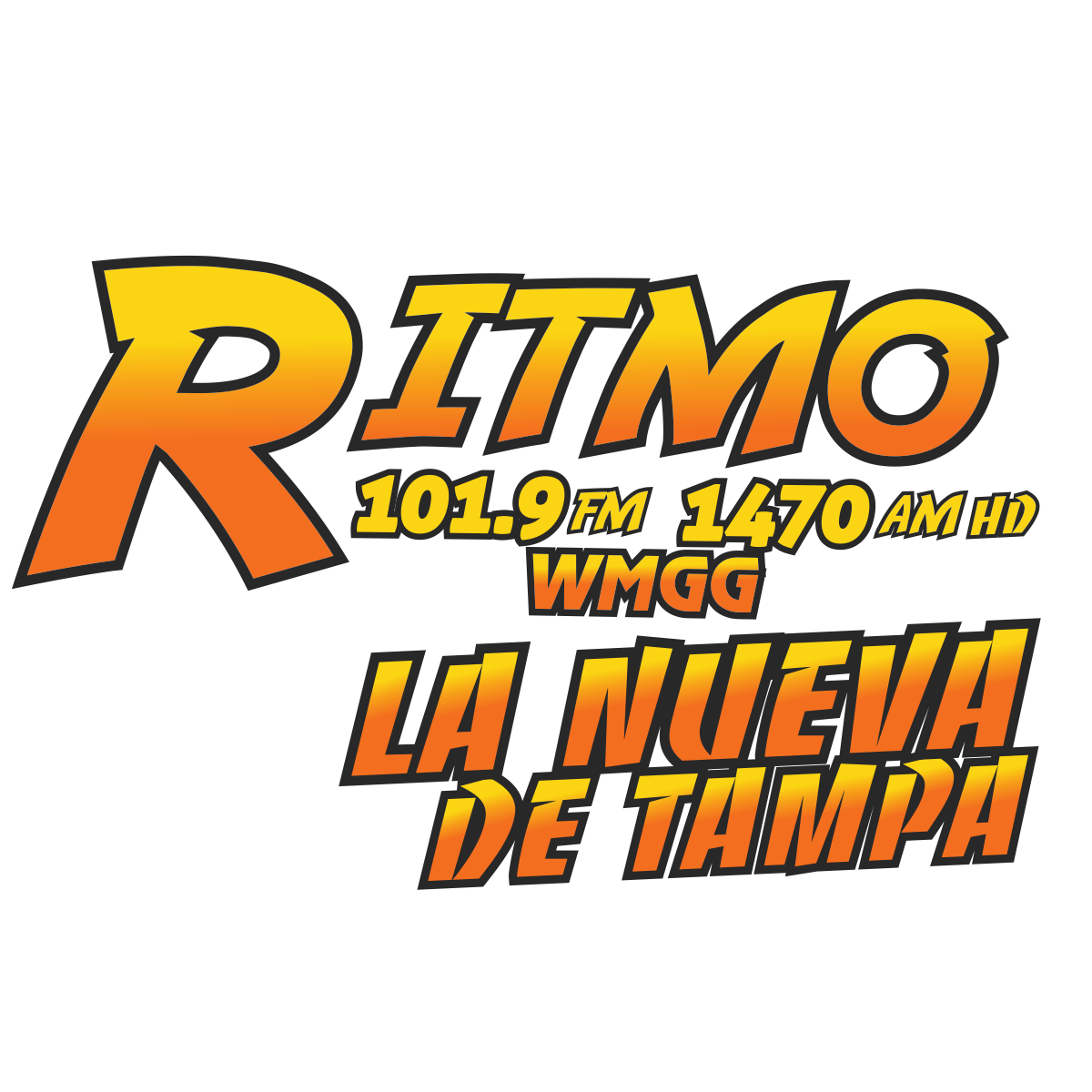
- Egypt Lake, Florida; United States
- Broadcast area: Tampa Bay area
- Frequency: 1470 kHz
- Branding: Ritmo 101.9

Programming
- Language: Spanish
- Format: Tropical

Ownership
- Owner: Daniel de la Rosa; (DRC Broadcasting, Inc.)
- Sister stations: WQXM

History
- First air date: 1954; 72 years ago (as WDCL Tarpon Springs)
- Former call signs: WDCL (1954–1960); WRBB (1960–1965); WCWR (1965–1973); WDCL (1973–1978); WWQT (1978–1983); WFNN (1983–1984); WVTY (1984–1986); WLVU (1986–1998); WTBL (1998–2000); WLVU (2000–2005); WHBO (2005–2009); WWBA (2009)
- Call sign meaning: "Mega" (former branding)

Technical information
- Licensing authority: FCC
- Facility ID: 67135
- Class: B
- Power: 2,800 watts (day); 800 watts (night)
- Transmitter coordinates: 28°0′43.1″N 82°29′52.3″W
- Translator: 101.9 W270DU (Tampa)

Links
- Public license information: Public file; LMS
- Website: www.ritmo1019.com

WMGG (1470 AM) is a commercial radio station licensed to Egypt Lake, Florida with a Spanish tropical format. WMGG serves the Tampa Bay area and is owned by Daniel de la Rosa, through licensee DRC Broadcasting, Inc. WMGG airs a Spanish language tropical radio format. The station uses the moniker "Ritmo 101.9".

WMGG's transmitter is off Cavacade Drive in Egypt Lake. It is powered at 2,800 watts by day. But at night, to protect other stations on AM 1470, WMGG reduces power to 800 watts. It uses a directional antenna at all times. It is licensed to broadcast using HD Radio technology under digital only MA3 operation, but has since switched back to analog only, despite "HD" remaining in the brand.

== History ==
In 1954, the station first signed on as WDCL. Its city of license was Tarpon Springs, Florida, and it was a 5,000 watt daytimer, required to go off the air at sunset. WDCL was owned by the Freede-Miller Broadcasting Company, with Hal Freede serving as president and sales manager. J. McCarthy Miller was the general manager.

In the late 1960s and parts of the 1970s, the station played a mix of Top 40 and oldies with the call sign WCWR.

In the mid-1970s under the ownership of Bud Paxson, the station became a news/talk station, and also originated the home shopping format through a radio program on the station; this would be the origination of what is now the cable network HSN and other competitors.

On May 17, 1984, the station became an affiliate of Dan Ingram's Top 40 Satellite Survey.

Prior to June 5, 2009, WMGG was an adult standards music station branded as "Mega 1470."

Prior to December 29, 2008, WMGG was an all-sports station as an ESPN Radio Network affiliate.

As a result of Genesis Communications' announced purchase of AM 1470, where the news/talk format of WWBA now airs at 820 AM, WHBO's sports format moved to WWBA's former frequency, 1040 AM, in October 2008, and simulcast on 1470 in the short-term. The WHBO call sign moved to 1040, with 1470 receiving new call letters, WMGG.

In 2011, WMGG switched to a talk radio format, picking up programs formerly on sister station 1040 WWBA (now WHBO).

Effective May 4, 2018, WMGG was sold to Nia Broadcasting, Inc. It switched to a simulcast of the Regional Mexican music format heard on co-owned 96.1 WTMP-FM in Dade City, Florida.

WMGG also switched its transmitter facilities to Egypt Lake, a suburb of Tampa, and no longer identifies Dunedin, Florida as its city of license. WMGG is diplexed with co-owned AM 1150 WTMP.

== HD Radio digital transmission ==
In October 2020, WMGG announced the station would be changing their AM band transmission to an exclusively digital signal, using MP3 mode HD Radio, and on January 12, 2021, switched off their analog AM signal. WMGG was the first radio station in the U.S. to use digital-only mode after the FCC approved the voluntary use of all digital transmissions on the AM band; it was the second station to go all-digital, after WWFD began operating under an experimental authorization as an all-digital station in July 2018.

On August 31, 2021, WMGG flipped to Spanish tropical, branded as "Ritmo 101.9"., La Nueva de Tampa.

Effective November 9, 2021, Nia Broadcasting sold WMGG and translator W270DU to DRC Broadcasting, Inc. for $600,000. Since then, the station switched back to analog only despite the "HD" remaining in the brand.
