= Richard Jadick =

American naval surgeon

- Education: Ithaca College (BS); New York Institute of Technology College of Osteopathic Medicine
- Occupation: Physician
- Known for: Bronze Star Medal

Richard H. Jadick is an American naval surgeon who was awarded the Bronze Star with “Combat V” device for heroic valor in January 2006. He was credited with saving the lives of 30 Marines and sailors during the Second Battle of Fallujah. Jadick was a lieutenant commander in the U.S. Navy Reserve, assigned as a battalion surgeon to the 1st Battalion, 8th Marine Regiment of the 2nd Marine Division from Camp Lejeune, North Carolina. Jadick is considered the Iraq War's most decorated doctor.

== Background ==
Jadick attended Bethlehem Central High School in Delmar, New York (just south of Albany). He earned his B.S. degree in biology from Ithaca College where he was a member of Delta Kappa local fraternity. He earned his Doctor of Osteopathic Medicine degree (D.O.) in osteopathic medicine from New York College of Osteopathic Medicine in Old Westbury, New York. He served as communications officer in the Marine Corps prior to joining the Navy. He received his residency training in Urology at the Medical College of Georgia.

== Service in Iraq ==
Jadick was serving as a medical officer at Camp Lejeune, North Carolina when he volunteered for duty in Iraq. He was an unlikely volunteer because he was 38 years old, significantly older than most combat surgeons, and his wife was nine months pregnant.

Early in his tour of duty, Jadick observed a Marine who died because he bled to death before he could be evacuated to a hospital. He decided to establish an emergency room on the battlefield, where wounded Marines could receive treatment within a few minutes of being injured. While there, Jadick and his crew of young Corpsmen improvised a number of life saving techniques.

During the 11-day battle Jadick's team treated hundreds of men. Only one of those men died after reaching the hospital. Fifty-three Marines and United States Navy SEALs died during the battle. Jadick's commanding officer estimated that another 30 would have died if Jadick had not been working so close to the front.

== After Iraq ==
Jadick's story was first documented in a Newsweek cover story titled "Hero, M.D." (although Jadick is actually a D.O., not an M.D.). He later published his own account of his experiences in a book called On Call in Hell: A Doctor's Iraq War Story.

After serving a year in Iraq, Jadick returned to the United States and accepted a position as a urology resident at the Medical College of Georgia. He remains on active duty.

Jadick is also the Chairman of The Independence Fund, a leading national nonprofit organization that supports wounded veterans and their families, headquartered in Charlotte, NC.
