= WTMP (AM) =

Radio station in Egypt Lake–Tampa, Florida

Coordinates: 28°00′42″N 82°29′53″W

- Egypt Lake, Florida; United States
- Broadcast area: Tampa Bay Area
- Frequency: 1150 kHz (HD Radio)
- Branding: WTMP AM 1150 102.1 FM

Programming
- Language: English
- Format: Sports radio
- Network: ESPN Radio

Ownership
- Owner: Neal Ardman; (NIA Broadcasting, Inc.)
- Sister stations: WTMP-FM

History
- First air date: December 1954; 71 years ago
- Call sign meaning: Tampa

Technical information
- Licensing authority: FCC
- Facility ID: 74108
- Class: B
- Power: 10,000 watts (day); 500 watts (night)
- Translators: 92.9 W225CQ (Tampa); 102.1 W271DL (Egypt Lake)

Links
- Public license information: Public file; LMS
- Website: am1150wtmp.com

WTMP (1150 kHz) is a commercial AM radio station licensed to Egypt Lake, Florida, and serving the Tampa Bay area, airing a sports radio format with programming from ESPN Radio. The station is owned by Neal Ardman of NIA Broadcasting, Inc. Its studios are on Howard Avenue in West Tampa.

By day, WTMP is powered at 10,000 watts. To protect other stations on 1150 AM from interference at night, it greatly reduces power to 500 watts. WTMP uses a directional antenna with a three-tower array, from its transmitter location on Cavacade Drive in Egypt Lake. Programming is also heard on two FM translators: W271DL on 102.1 MHz in Egypt Lake and W225CQ on 92.9 MHz in Tampa.

== Station history ==
=== African-American voice ===
WTMP signed on the air in December 1954. It began as a daytimer powered at 1,000 watts and required to go off the air at sunset. It was owned by Rounsaville of Tampa, Inc. From its start, it aired programming for Tampa's African-American community, a mix of R&B, urban gospel, talk and news. Noted R&B vocalist and Tampa native King Coleman got his start as a disc jockey on WTMP in the 1950s.

In the late 1990s, the station, then-owned by Broadcast Capital, was bought by Tama Broadcasting, which has headquarters in Tampa. Long controlled by the Cherry family, Tama also owns stations in Daytona Beach, Jacksonville, Savannah, Georgia and Greenville, South Carolina, as well as newspapers in Daytona Beach and Fort Pierce. The owner went on to buy the then-WGUL in 2002 and made it a hip hop-urban station as WTMP-FM. It featured the syndicated show Russ Parr in the Morning. Even after a format change to rhythmic oldies, the FM station did not do well due to its rimshot signal, so it ended up as a simulcast of WTMP a year later. The rimshot signal, which barely reaches the Hillsborough County line from its transmitter southeast of Brooksville, also couldn't be moved closer to Tampa or upgraded with changes to the tower or transmitter power, due to interference issues with other stations broadcasting on 96.1 and nearby frequencies.

=== Spanish tropical ===
At 3 pm on September 2, 2011, after a 57-year run, WTMP's legacy as an R&B outlet came to an abrupt end. Davidson Media Group took over operation of the station under a local marketing agreement (LMA) from Tama, which filed for bankruptcy protection and placed the station in court-ordered receivership. Davidson then flipped the combo to a Spanish Tropical music format. All of WTMP's airstaff and syndicated shows were already pink-slipped a day before the flip. The Tropical format lasted only three years.

It was announced that WTMP would return to an Urban AC format on May 1, 2014. The two stations were split from common operation with the flip, as the operation of WTMP was taken over by WestCoast Media, while the FM was retained by Davidson.

On March 14, 2016, WTMP flipped to classic hip hop as "Boomin' 1150".

=== NIA Broadcasting ===
Both WTMP 1150 AM and WTMP-FM 96.1 were purchased out of bankruptcy by Neal Ardman's NIA Broadcasting, Inc. effective May 18, 2017. The purchase price was $500,000. In March 2022, one of WTMP's translators moved from 97.5 to 102.1 MHz.

On October 1, 2022, WTMP added a translator at 92.9 MHz to boost its coverage into downtown Tampa on the FM dial. This is the first time since the station was on 97.5FM that the station could be heard on FM in and around Tampa.

The station replaced a rhythmic oldies format with ESPN Radio programming on February 7, 2025. The network had been absent from Tampa Bay after WDAE, which had previously aired its nighttime and weekend programming, dropped it in December 2024.

== See also ==
- WTMP-FM
