= WYUU =

- Safety Harbor, Florida; United States
- Broadcast area: Tampa, Florida
- Frequency: 92.5 MHz (HD Radio)
- Branding: Maxima FM

Programming
- Language: Spanish
- Format: Latin pop
- Subchannels: HD2: Playa 106.9 (Spanish tropical)

Ownership
- Owner: Beasley Broadcast Group; (Beasley Media Group Licenses, LLC)
- Sister stations: WJBR, WLLD, WQYK-FM, WRBQ-FM

History
- First air date: October 1983 (as WXCR)
- Former call signs: WOOT (4/1982-8/1982); WXCR (1982–1989)
- Call sign meaning: sounds like "U" (station's former moniker as an oldies station)

Technical information
- Licensing authority: FCC
- Facility ID: 18512
- Class: C2
- ERP: 50,000 watts
- HAAT: 149 meters (489 ft)
- Transmitter coordinates: 27°50′32″N 82°48′52″W
- Translators: HD2: 103.1 W276CX (New Port Richey); HD2: 106.9 W295CF (Clearwater)

Links
- Public license information: Public file; LMS
- Webcast: Listen live Listen live (HD2)
- Website: 925maxima.com playatampa.com (HD2)

WYUU (92.5 FM) is a radio station broadcasting from Safety Harbor, Florida, and serving the Tampa/St. Petersburg, Florida area. The station airs a Latin pop format branded as "Maxima FM". Owned by Beasley Broadcast Group, its studios are in St. Petersburg while its transmitter is in Seminole.

== History ==
=== Classical (1983–1989) ===
After being issued a construction permit, the station signed on the air in October 1983 as WXCR with a classical music format, advertising itself as "Concert Radio". On April 30, 1985, the founding ownership group, Tampa Bay Concert Radio, sold the station for $1.9 million to Entercom, a Pennsylvania-based company owning several U.S. radio stations.

=== Oldies (1989–2002) ===
Entercom continued the classical music format until September 28, 1989, when the station flipped to oldies, branded first as "Oldies 92.5", then later rebranded as "U92". WYUU flipped to oldies at around the same time the other former oldies station WFLZ switched to its CHR format after a week of stunting.

=== Country (2002–2005) ===
On April 18, 2002, a major change took place at WYUU. Sister station WRBQ-FM (104.7, also known as Q105), which aired a country format at the time, swapped formats with WYUU. This was done at the behest of U92 program director Mason Dixon, who was once a popular personality on Q105 when it was a Top-40 powerhouse throughout the 1980s and wanted to return there (not to mention WRBQ boasts a stronger signal). WYUU thus became a country station and was dubbed "Country 92.5", before rebranding as "Kickass Country, Outlaw Country 92.5". It was a NASCAR Nextel Cup Series radio affiliate and also brought The Cowhead Show (morning drive, 6am-10am) over from WRBQ.

However, Outlaw 92.5 found itself as the third country station in a two country station market when Clear Channel’s WTBT flipped to country as WFUS on April 14, 2005. With sister station WQYK-FM also playing country in the market, it became obvious to many observers that something had to give, particularly with country stations out of Polk County (97.5 WPCV) and Sarasota (106.5 WCTQ) edging into the fringes of the Tampa/St. Petersburg/Clearwater market.

=== Spanish (2005–present) ===
Finally, on August 7, 2005, WYUU flipped to a tropical music format following its broadcast of the Indianapolis Brickyard 400 NASCAR race. After three commercials, an announcement told listeners that a new format had come to the signal: "La Nueva 92.5, The Latin Sound of Tampa Bay". It became the second tropical station of Infinity Broadcasting (now CBS Radio) after WLZL in Washington, D.C./Baltimore, which also signed on the same year.

In October 2008, WYUU was rebranded as Maxima 92.5. With this, WYUU began leaning towards rhythmic hits, but still reported by Mediabase and Nielsen BDS as a tropical station.

On October 2, 2014, CBS Radio announced that it would trade all of their Charlotte and Tampa stations (including WYUU), as well as WIP in Philadelphia, to the Beasley Broadcast Group in exchange for 5 stations located in Miami and Philadelphia. The swap was completed on December 1, 2014.

In 2015, WYUU added some English pop music into their playlist, making them a rhythmic-leaning Latin pop station.

On Christmas Eve and Christmas Day, WYUU plays Spanish holiday music.

== WYUU-HD2 ==
WYUU signed on HD Radio operations in 2006. WYUU-HD1 airs the same programming as the analog frequency, while WYUU-HD2 aired a salsa music format, branded as "Maxima Exitos." On January 22, 2017, WYUU-HD2 began simulcasting on translator 106.9 W295CF (which had been initially simulcasting sister WHFS), and began stunting with remixed Miami bass music as "El Booty", branding themselves as “The Official Station For Latina Strippers Of Tampa Bay”. Following the stunt, 106.9/92.5 HD2 launched a Spanish tropical format as "Playa 106.9", a format found on sister station W251AL/WRXK-FM-HD2 in nearby Fort Myers (and formerly the primary format that aired on WYUU from 2005 to 2008); a Facebook page for "Playa Tampa" was established a week before, on the 13th, featuring a logo promoting the signals.
