= Sports Fan Radio Network =

American sports talk radio network, 1993–2001

The Sports Fan Radio Network was a national sports talk radio network that existed from 1993 through 2001, when it abruptly folded.

== History ==
=== Launch ===
SportsFan Radio Network officially debuted in 1993 with 80 hours of programming per month. Based in Las Vegas, the network broadcast its flagship show SportsFan Tonight from the Sports Theatre in the Las Vegas Hilton. Original hosts of the show were Geoff Nathanson and long time NFL scribe Howard Balzer.

=== 1994-2000 ===
By 1994, SportsFan expanded to a 24/7 format, seven days a week. The signature show, SportsFan Tonight moved its broadcast location from the MGM Grand Las Vegas in 1994. Later it moved to the sportsbook at the Mandalay Bay. The daily line up included baseball's all-time hit leader Pete Rose, as well as a stable of young talent. Others hosting shows over the years included former NFL QB Sean Salisbury, former NFL All-Pro Tim Ryan, Fox and CBS host James Brown, longtime broadcaster Pat O'Brien, former NBA coach Matt Goukas, NHL great Phil Esposito, former NFL All-Pro Bob Golic and former NCAA basketball coaches Bill Frieder and Fran Fraschilla. Other hosts included Bruce Schein, Chris Russo (now Russell), J. T. the Brick, Steve Cofield, Rob Tepper, Chuck Powell, Ryan Williams, Marty Tirrell, Ken Miller, Soren Petro, Rob Fischer, Mike "The Sports Pig" Responts, John Phillips, John Rabe, Brandon Tierney, Jim Brinson, Chad Andrus. Scott Ferrall, Dave Cokin, Eric Pollero, Tim Neverett and others. By the late '90s, SportsFan partnered with CBS Sportsline to broadcast two shows daily. One program was hosted by Craig Carton, the other "The Drive" with Scott Kaplan and Sid Rosenberg. Later they landed a handful of other significant names, including Nanci Donellan (a.k.a. "The Fabulous Sports Babe") from ESPN Radio. Keith Olbermann also hosted a few shows.

=== Closure ===
In 2001, however, the network began facing intense pressure from upstart network Fox Sports Radio, which had the major backing of industry giant Clear Channel Communications. Additionally, SFRN's parent company, Winstar Communications, a NASDAQ-traded telecommunications firm, began experiencing severe financial trouble (which eventually ended in bankruptcy). Determining that the network could not compete with ESPN, Fox, and One on One Sports, Sports Fan Radio Network began dismantling. Eventually, Donnellan was fired one week before the Super Bowl, leaving J. T. the Brick and Scott Ferrall as some of the remaining hosts, hosting two live shifts plus replays throughout the day. The network folded in May 2001, ceding most of its affiliates to Fox.

== Former hosts ==
After being released by Sports Fan, The Fabulous Sports Babe took an approximately 6-year break from radio broadcasting, during which she underwent treatment for cancer. She returned in sporadic guest hosting gigs in 2007, and in April 2008, returned full-time as the co-host of "Brantley and the Babe" on WHBO in Tampa Bay. After various stops on Tampa Bay area radio stations, she left radio again in 2014.

Chuck Powell hosted news talk and FM morning radio in Phoenix from 2003 to 2009. He's now with Seattle's KJR from 10a-Noon.

After the folding of Sports Fan, Frank Andrews, whose real name is Angelo Fracassi, changed his stage name to "Zig" and went to work in his native Western New York, for the now defunct radio station WNSA. After that station was sold off, Zig landed a job at Sirius Satellite Radio, where he hosted NHL Live (until that show moved to XM) and is currently a weekend anchor for Sirius NFL Radio and Mad Dog Radio.

Soren Petro now hosts "The Program" in Kansas City on 810 WHB, one of the largest sports talk stations in the country (covering six states).

After the dissolution of SFRN, J. T. the Brick was almost immediately hired by Fox Sports Radio, where he is today.

Scott Ferrall currently works for CBS Sports Radio; he spent several years at Sirius XM Radio's Howard 101 prior to joining CBS.

Bill Lekas went to Sporting News Radio and later moved to Sirius XM Radio.

Dave Cokin and Steve Cofield stayed in Las Vegas, hosting on ESPN920 and FoxSportsRadio1460. They teamed up for DC and the Sunshine Man on ESPN1100 from 2007 to 2011. They currently do shows on ESPN1100/100.9 FM, Cokin from 2–3 and Cofield 3–6.

"The Sports Pig" hosted in Boise, and then back in Las Vegas on FoxSportsRadio1460. He was joined by Cofield for "Steve and the Sports Pig" from 2004 to 2007. He died in 2012 at age 52.

Scott Kaplan and Sid Rosenberg would go on to be the original co-hosts of The Sports Guys on WNEW-FM. Kaplan now works at XEPRS-AM in San Diego. Rosenberg went on to greater fame as a co-host at WFAN, working alongside the likes of Joe Benigno and Don Imus, eventually inheriting Imus's time slot after his retirement and death. Jorge Sedano now hosts The Sedano Show nationally on ESPN Radio.

Ryan Williams, hired from WFAN when SFRN launched 24/7, hosted weekends and moved to mornings teaming up with fellow host Steve Cofield, with major affiliates in Tampa, Pittsburgh, San Francisco and Las Vegas. Williams moved to the program director position and was also responsible for discovering Chris Russo (Russell), Bill Lekas and Brandon Tierney, providing them with their first national presence in the industry.

Craig Carton was a co-host Boomer and Carton in the Morning on WFAN, but was convicted on federal fraud charges and reported to prison in June 2019.

John Phillips was with CBS Radio Pittsburgh 93.7 The Fan working as a sports anchor/reporter and talk-show host.

Tim Ryan is now with the NFL on Fox and Sirius NFL Radio.

Bruce Schein currently produces (and appears on-air) on Christopher "Mad Dog" Russo's television program High Heat on the MLB Network.

There was also a weekend host by the name of Chris Russo (not the same Chris Russo of Mike and the Mad Dog fame); he hosted the Redskins pre-and post game shows on the Washington Redskins radio network. He's now a host and the Redskins Insider for ESPN980 in 2005.

Rocco Pendola hosted a show on the network. He is no longer in radio and works as a freelance writer, recently appearing as a regular on thestreet.com.

Eric Pollero, who hosted and produced the show "SportsFan Conversations", went on to work at CBS SportsLine in Florida. Eric is currently an account executive with WSJS/Curtis Media Group in North Carolina.

Geoff Nathanson went on to work in television and radio as a play-by-play announcer and host at LA powerhouse radio station KNX 1070. He also developed into the go-to guy for TV sportscaster parts and commercials, working in a famous LeBron James Powerade spot, a Lance Armstrong Nike commercial, a Gordie Howe IBM spot and a David Eckstein Del Taco commercial. He has appeared as a recurring character in the ABC Family Channel series, "Make it or Break it" as well as on "Providence", King of Queens" and hosted the World Championship of Fantasy Football on Versus.

== Former station ==
At least one affiliate, KSFN in Las Vegas, Nevada (the flagship station of Frank Andrews's and Papa Joe's program), took its call sign from the network. It later became KXST, a CBS Sports Radio station.
