= WQBN =

- Temple Terrace, Florida; United States
- Broadcast area: Tampa Bay
- Frequency: 1300 kHz
- Branding: Super Q 1300

Programming
- Format: Spanish Variety

Ownership
- Owner: Cristian and Norberto Vallejo; (Crisbeto Enterprises Corp.)

History
- Call sign meaning: QBN = "Cuban"

Technical information
- Licensing authority: FCC
- Facility ID: 74155
- Class: D
- Power: 5,000 watts day 16 watts night
- Transmitter coordinates: 27°56′51.00″N 82°23′45.00″W
- Translators: W294CR 106.7 MHz (Tampa); W280FD 103.9 MHz (Largo)
- Repeater: 96.1 WTMP-FM-HD2 (Dade City)

Links
- Public license information: Public file; LMS
- Website: www.q1300.com

WQBN (1300 AM) is a radio station broadcasting a Spanish Variety format. Licensed to Temple Terrace, Florida, United States, it serves the Tampa Bay area. The station is currently owned by Cristian and Norberto Vallejo, through licensee Crisbeto Enterprises Corp. It is the home for Tampa Bay Rays baseball in Spanish. Similar to cases where the night power is down to a handful of Watts, here we have a three mast Day and Critical array and a monopole at Night. This is quite rare.

== FM translator ==
WQBN programming is simulcast on an FM translator to improve coverage, especially during the hours between sunset and sunrise when the AM station broadcasts with only 16 watts. The translator also provides high fidelity sound, inherent on FM.

Broadcast translators for WQBN
Call sign	Frequency	City of license	FID	ERP (W)	Class	FCC info
W294CR	106.7 FM	Tampa, Florida	203078	250	D	LMS
W280FD	103.9 FM	Largo, Florida	158581	65	D	LMS
