= WTMP-FM =

Coordinates: 28°04′07″N 82°33′08″W

- Dade City, Florida; United States
- Broadcast area: Tampa Bay Area
- Frequency: 96.1 MHz (HD Radio)
- Branding: La Invasora 96

Programming
- Language: Spanish
- Format: Regional Mexican
- Subchannels: HD2: WQBN simulcast
- Affiliations: Tampa Bay Buccaneers Spanish Radio Network

Ownership
- Owner: Vallejo Production; (NIA Broadcasting, Inc.)
- Sister stations: WTMP

History
- First air date: September 3, 1993; 32 years ago
- Former call signs: WBSB (1993–2001)
- Call sign meaning: Tampa

Technical information
- Licensing authority: FCC
- Facility ID: 15239
- Class: A
- ERP: 2,800 watts
- HAAT: 147 meters (482 ft)

Links
- Public license information: Public file; LMS
- Website: lainvasora96.com

WTMP-FM (96.1 MHz "La Invasora 96") is a commercial radio station licensed to Dade City, Florida. The station is owned by Vallejo Production. WTMP-FM airs a Spanish-language regional Mexican radio format. WTMP-FM is the Spanish-language flagship station for the Tampa Bay Buccaneers Spanish Radio Network.

WTMP-FM's studios are on 5207 E Washington St in Tampa. Its transmitter is off Spike Road near Spring Lake Highway in Spring Lake, Florida. WTMP-FM is a Class A station, with an effective radiated power (ERP) of 2,800 watts, while several Tampa Bay stations operate at 100,000 watts. This makes WTMP-FM limited in its coverage area to the northern suburbs in the Tampa Bay area.

== History ==
The station first signed on the air on September 3, 1993, as WBSB. It was owned by Dade City Broadcasting, Inc. and aired an adult contemporary music format.

In 2001, the station was acquired by Tama Broadcasting, Inc. for $4.1 million. Tama already owned WTMP (1150 AM), an urban adult contemporary station. Tama put the same format on 96.1, switching the call sign to WTMP-FM.

In 2018, NIA Broadcasting bought WTMP-FM for $350,000. NIA, owned by Neal Ardman, began simulcasting the regional Mexican format heard on WMGG on WTMP-FM, calling the stations "La Mexicana 96.1 and 1470", but later switched the moniker to "Caliente 96.1 and 1470". It has since split from the WMGG simulcast and rebranded as "La Invasora 96".
