= JT the Brick =

American sports talk radio host

Brick at Night with JT the Brick
- Genre: Sports talk
- Running time: 11 PM – 3 AM (Eastern); 8 PM – 12 AM (Pacific)
- Country of origin: United States
- Home station: Mad Dog Sports Radio
- Starring: JT the Brick
- Opening theme: "Down with the Sickness" by Disturbed

John Tournour (born November 23, 1965), better known as JT the Brick, is an American sports talk radio host based in Las Vegas, Nevada. He hosts Brick at Night with JT the Brick on Sirius XM Satellite Radio's Mad Dog Sports Radio, a show on KRLV in Las Vegas, and various programs for the Las Vegas Raiders including the team's radio pregame show. Tournour graduated from SUNY Geneseo in 1987 with a degree in Speech Communication. He was also president of Delta Kappa Tau fraternity and a member of the rugby team.

== Career ==
Tournour, a former stockbroker, got his start in sports radio after becoming a frequent caller to The Jim Rome Show. After winning the initial "Smack-Off" in 1995, Tournour was offered a job hosting a late-night Sunday show at KMAX-Los Angeles.

From there, Tournour moved his show to KFMB in San Diego, where he only spent a few weeks before being offered a show on the now-defunct Las Vegas-based Sports Fan Radio Network. Tournour's late-night show lasted five years until the network's demise in 2001. While working in Las Vegas, he called the very first game of the original XFL featuring the Las Vegas Outlaws over local radio. During this time, he also hosted an afternoon show on San Francisco-based radio station KNBR. At one time, KNBR had Tournour for his local show, his four-hour national show and an overnight replay of at least a portion of that national show before the next broadcast day began.

In June 2001, Tournour landed at the upstart Fox Sports Radio, hosting an afternoon show. He was later moved to the evening, doing a late-night syndicated sports show on SportsFan Radio Network. The show was shifted to 3 pm Pacific, 6 pm Eastern, in 2012.

Tournour also hosted, until the end of the 2005 season, a Sunday night show, Fox Sunday Game Time React, where he discussed the football games of the day with Bryan Cox. It was eventually replaced by a similar show hosted by John Fricke and Chris Landry.

He previously hosted a show that aired weekdays from 5 pm to 8 pm Pacific time (8 pm to 11 pm Eastern) on Fox Sports Radio. The primary focus of his Fox Sports Radio program was the NFL and on Friday nights during the season and playoffs, he asked for at least one caller from every NFL team (during the playoffs, those in the playoffs) to answer his "NFL Roll Call". Fox Sports announced on September 11, 2018, that Tournour and producer Steve Gorman were let go by the network.

Tournour made a guest appearance on CNBC's The Big Idea with Donny Deutsch on June 26, 2006, to discuss the feud between Chicago Sun-Times columnist Jay Mariotti and Chicago White Sox skipper Ozzie Guillén.

=== The JT the Brick Show ===
Tomm Looney, the voice of The Best Damn Sports Show Period, works alongside Tournour on the show. Looney is best known for providing the two-times-hourly sports updates and for hosting the entertainment segment of the show which is called "Pop Looney".

In addition to his hosting duties, Tournour for a time wrote a regular sports column for MSNBC.com.

=== Brick at Night with JT the Brick ===
On October 8, 2019, JT began hosting his own late night show, "Brick at Night With JT the Brick." on Sirius XM's Mad Dog Sports Radio. The show airs Sunday through Thursday nights at 11 pm - 3 am eastern (8 pm - 12 am Pacific).

== Origin of nickname ==
The nickname "the Brick" originates from living in Newark, New Jersey. The city is known as "Brick City."

== Relationship with Jim Rome ==
Tournour made himself available for an extensive interview in Alan Eisenstock's 2001 book, Sports Talk (Rome declined numerous requests for an interview for the same book). In the interview, Tournour details his decision to leave a six-figure income as a stockbroker to chase his dream of talking sports for a living. He also weighs in about his relationship with Rome:

He's done everything for me. But he's done nothing for me (sic). It took Jim a while to get successful. I'm only in my fourth year. I've got two syndicated shows and I'm in the number four market (San Francisco/Oakland/San Jose). His fourth year, he was reading traffic.

On July 4, 2019, Tournour guest hosted for Jim Rome for the first time ever.

== Family ==
Tournour purchased a residence in Summerlin, Nevada with his wife Julie and their two sons on January 7, 2010.
