= Delta Kappa =

American collegiate fraternity

- ΔΚ
- Founded: September 1920; 106 years ago Buffalo State College
- Type: Social
- Affiliation: Independent
- Status: Merged
- Merge date: 1964
- Successor: Sigma Pi
- Emphasis: Education majors
- Scope: National (US)
- Motto: "True leadership is possible only through honorable and upright living"
- Slogan: Korufaios, Kathapos, and Kosmos
- Member badge
- Colors: White and Maroon
- Flower: Red Rose
- Jewel: Pearl and Ruby
- Publication: The Deltan
- Chapters: 21
- Members: 1,200+ lifetime
- Nickname: DK
- Former name: Kappa Kappa Kappa
- Headquarters: Milwaukee, Wisconsin; United States

Delta Kappa Fraternity (ΔΚ) was an American national fraternity that existed from 1920 to 1964.

== History ==
=== Founding and early growth ===
The fraternity was founded in 1920 as Kappa Kappa Kappa at the State Normal School (now Buffalo State University) as a fraternity for students majoring in education. Its founders were James Finley, Albert Meinhold, Albert Stalk, Fred Weyler, and Arthur S. Bellfield. It assumed the name Kappa Kappa Kappa (ΚΚΚ) to represent the tri-Kappa symbolism of Korufaios, Kathapos, and Kosmos.

In 1925, it became a national fraternity with the chartering of its second chapter at SUNY Cortland. Its headquarters were in Buffalo, New York. The organization was first incorporated in New York in 1930.

At its 1936 convention, the fraternity voted to change its name to Delta Kappa to avoid being confused with the Ku Klux Klan. It was incorporated for a second time under the new name in 1937. At the same time, the fraternity changed its emphasis from professional to social and allowed any bachelor's degree-granting institution to host a chapter.

The fraternity went inactive from 1944 to 1946 during World War II. Delta Kappa quickly reactivated seven chapters by the end of 1948. The organization then began expanding outside of the state of New York by adding chapters in six other states. This growth was hastened when the fraternity decided to drop the requirement that at least half the members of any petitioning fraternal group be working toward a degree in the teaching profession.

=== Loss of chapters ===
Delta Kappa grew until a 1953 edict by the SUNY Board of Trustees forced the abandonment of all chapters affiliated with national societies in state-supported schools. This impacted seven of the fraternity's eighteen chapters. Delta Kappa, along with several other Greek Letter organizations, fought this edict in court under the case name Webb vs. State University of New York where they argued for the benefits of national affiliation and showed the lack of discriminatory clauses in their constitutions. Unfortunately for Delta Kappa, the courts sided with the SUNY Board of Trustees in 1954 by ruling that the trustees were acting in their supervisory powers.

The decision cost the fraternity eight chapters in New York State. In a later petition, the fraternity claimed that the edict also caused the closing of two other chapters (ΔΡ and ΗΦ). With the loss of the court case, the chapters at SUNY institutions became independent local fraternities after 1953.

The loss of chapters and know-how threw the Delta Kappa national leadership into a tailspin. The Delta Chi and Kappa chapters left the fraternity and affiliated with other organizations.

=== Reorganization in Wisconsin ===
Within the space of a year, Delta Kappa went from having nineteen chapters to seven. With most of the active chapters now in Wisconsin, a meeting was called in 1954 where it was decided that there should be an attempt to save the fraternity. In 1956, the fraternity was incorporated for the third time in the state of Wisconsin, and the national offices were moved to Milwaukee.

Delta Kappa added two chapters between 1954 and 1963, but Phi, Chi Delta, and Sigma Phi chapters disaffiliated to join other organizations. By 1963, there were only six chapters left in the fraternity.

=== Merger ===
In an attempt to save the remaining chapters and preserve some unity, the fraternity began looking at other organizations for a merger. Fraternities with active chapters at the six schools where Delta Kappa was active were not considered. Of the remaining organizations, Sigma Pi fraternity was chosen since it was considered best at fulfilling the goals of its members.

With the approval of the Delta Kappa convention in July 1964 and the Sigma Pi convention in September, the two fraternities completed the merger in late 1964. Of the six chapters, four (Wisconsin-Milwaukee, Wisconsin-Stout, Milton, and Western State College of Colorado) became Sigma Pi chapters. The chapter at Wisconsin-Oshkosh decided to go its own way and affiliate with Delta Sigma Phi fraternity. The chapter at Ithaca College (which is not a SUNY institution) became a local fraternity.

With the merger, Sigma Pi gave the joining Delta Kappa chapters designations starting with Delta to help maintain their sense of history; this diverged from the standard naming order since at that time its new chapters were being named in the Gamma series. Sigma Pi also initiated any Delta Kappa alumni who wished to attend their initiation ceremonies.

After the merger, Sigma Pi made an effort to reach out to Delta Kappa alumni in Wisconsin by colonizing at schools that once had DK chapters or where alumni were nearby. Between 1966 and 1971, five chapters were chartered at Wisconsin-Stevens Point, Wisconsin-Oshkosh, Wisconsin-Whitewater, Wisconsin-Platteville, and Wisconsin-LaCrosse. When the SUNY ban on national fraternities was lifted in 1976, Sigma Pi contacted the surviving chapters of Delta Kappa in New York state but there was little interest in joining a national organization again.

== Symbols ==
The Delta Kappa motto was "True leadership is possible only through honorable and upright living." Its slogan was Korufaios, Kathapos, and Kosmos. The fraternity's colors were white and maroon.

The fraternity's badge was a triangle with a black center with the Greek letters Δ and Κ in gold. The Greek letter of the chapter name was attached to the badge and served as a guard. The Delta Kappa recognition pin featured the letters Δ and Κ joined at the middle.

Delta Kappa's flower was the red rose. Its jewels were the pearl and the ruby. It publications included annual The Kappan and The Deltan was a newsletter that was published at the discretion of the national officers, starting in 1958.

== Membership ==
Membership in Delta Kappa, like most fraternities, was limited to males. The 1959 Pledge Manual stated that "membership is open to any male who believes in a supreme being." According to the 1963 edition of Baird's Manual, there were no membership restrictions. Baird's also stated that the organization had 1,200 members in 1963.

== Governance ==
=== Grand Chapter ===
The Grand Chapter of Delta Kappa met in the spring during the National Convention and was composed of the Board of Directors and delegates from each chapter and alumni club. The Board of Directors was composed of six national officers: president, vice president, corresponding secretary, recording secretary, treasurer, and librarian. Each chapter could send two voting delegates to the Grand Chapter, while alumni clubs received one voting delegate. A two-thirds vote was needed for the Grand Chapter to pass by-laws or to suspend chapters. The National Convention was held annually with a different chapter hosting each convention and arranging the accommodations.

Two awards were given during the National Convention. A Scholarship Award was given to the chapter with the highest Grade Point Average. A Distance Travelled Award was given to the chapter that traveled the farthest to attend the conference.

A Fall Business Meeting could also be called at the discretion of the National President. Attendance was not compulsory.

=== Board of directors ===
The Board of Directors governed the fraternity when the Grand Chapter was not in session. Board members were elected to one-year terms at each meeting of the Grand Chapter. The president was the executive of the fraternity, while the vice president oversaw the ritual and was the director of expansion. The corresponding secretary kept meeting minutes and oversaw correspondence, and the recording secretary kept membership records. The treasurer kept the fraternity's finances, and the Llbrarian acted as the historian and publisher of The Kappan.

Each chapter was inspected yearly by at least one member of the Board of Directors during a chapter visitation.

=== NIC ===
Delta Kappa was not a member of the National Interfraternity Conference (NIC). Between 1954 and 1964, the fraternity lost three chapters to NIC member fraternities. This did not violate the NIC anti-pirating rule since it only applies to member fraternity chapters.

=== Expansion Plan ===
Delta Kappa's expansion plan called for contacting local fraternities with at least ten members at accredited four-year colleges. Petitioning groups paid installation fees but had their first-year chapter dues waived.

== Chapters ==
Following is a list of the undergraduate chapters of Delta Kappa.

Chapter	Charter date and range	Institution	Location	Status	Ref.
Alpha	September 1920–1944; 1946–1953	Buffalo State College	Buffalo, New York	Withdrew	(Note: Chapter formed at State Normal School – Buffalo, now Buffalo State College. It became Delta Kappa (local) fraternity in 1953.)
Beta	1925–1944; 1946–1953	State University of New York at Cortland	Cortland, New York	Withdrew	(Note: Chapter formed at Cortland State Normal School, now SUNY Cortland. It withdrew and became Delta Kappa Beta (local) fraternity in 1953; it lost university recognition in 1991 and was banned by the university in 2000.)
Gamma	March 1926–1944; 1946–Fall 1953	State University of New York at Oswego	Oswego, New York	Withdrew	(Note: Chapter was founded at Oswego State Normal School, now SUNY Oswego. It became Delta Kappa Gamma (local) in 1953, changing its name to Delta Kappa Kappa in the fall of 1955, and is still active.)
Delta	1927–1932; March 14, 1953 – 1953	State University of New York at Plattsburgh	Plattsburgh, New York	Withdrew	(Note: Chapter was founded at Plattsburgh State Normal School, now SUNY Plattsburgh. It became Delta Kappa Delta (local) fraternity in 1953 which closed in 1979.)
Epsilon	1931–1944; May 1948 – 1964	Ithaca College	Ithaca, New York	Withdrew	(Note: Chapter became Delta Kappa (local) fraternity in 1964. Ithaca removed recognition from most Greek letter organizations in the 1980s and the chapter went inactive in 2009.)
Zeta	May 26, 1935–1944; September 1946 – 1953	State University of New York at New Paltz	New Paltz, New York	Withdrew	(Note: Chapter formed at the New Paltz State Normal School, now SUNY New Paltz. It became Delta Kappa Zeta (local) fraternity in 1953.)
Eta	November 1942–March 1943; December 6, 1947–1953	State University of New York at Oneonta	Oneonta, New York	Withdrew	(Note: Chapter formed from the merger of two local fraternities, Pi Delta Alpha and Phi Lambda Chi at Oneonta State Normal School (now SUNY Oneonta).) (Note: Chapter became Delta Phi Kappa (local) fraternity in 1953 and closed in 1984.)
Theta	June 1, 1946 – 1953	State University of New York at Potsdam	Potsdam, New York	Withdrew	(Note: Chapter was founded as Potsdam State Teacher's College (now SUNY Potdam) from Sigma Tau (local). Sigma Tau was the reformation of Sigma Sigma Sigma, a local fraternity that was established in 1932 but became dormant during World War II.) (Note: Chapter became Delta Kappa Theta local fraternity in 1953.)
Iota	1948–1953	State University of New York at Geneseo	Geneseo, New York	Withdrew	(Note: Chapter formed from Alpha Sigma Epsilon (local), established at Geneseo State Teacher's College (SUNY Geneseo) as the Delphic Society in 1871. It became Delta Kappa Tau (local) fraternity in 1953.)
Kappa	March 4, 1950 – 1954	Indiana State University	Terre Haute, Indiana	Withdrew	(Note: Chapter formed at Indiana State Teacher's College (now Indiana State University). It disaffiliated from the national organization in the winter term of 1954 and became the Kappa Zeta (local) fraternity. In May 1954, it became the Indiana Delta chapter of Sigma Phi Epsilon.)
Delta Chi	January 27, 1951 – 1953	Southeast Missouri State University	Cape Girardeau, Missouri	Withdrew (ΤΚΕ)	(Note: Chapter formed from Delta Chi Delta (local), established on March 19, 1949. It disaffiliated from Delta Kappa and became the Delta Zeta chapter of Tau Kappa Epsilon in 1953.)
Delta Rho	April 21, 1951 – 1954	James Madison University	Harrisonburg, Virginia	Withdrew (ΤΚΕ)	(Note: Chapter formed from Sigma Delta Rho (local), established in 1947. It disaffiliated from the national organization in 1954 and became Sigma Delta Rho (local). It became the Mu Tau chapter of Tau Kappa Epsilon in 1969.)
Phi	1951–1960	Clarion University of Pennsylvania	Clarion, Pennsylvania	Withdrew (ΘΧ)	(Note: Chapter formed from Alpha Phi Alpha (local), established in 1930. It disaffiliated from the national fraternity in 1960 and became the Epsilon Xi chapter of Theta Chi later that year.)
Sigma Phi	1951–1962	Frostburg State University	Frostburg, Maryland	Withdrew (ΤΚΕ)	(Note: Chapter formed at State Teachers' College at Frostburg (now Frostburg State University) from Omega Sigma Phi (local), established in 1935. It disaffiliated from Delta Kappa and became the Theta Chi chapter of Tau Kappa Epsilon in 1962. It is now Alpha Theta Chi (local) and is not recognized by the university.)
Sigma	November 30, 1951 – 1964	University of Wisconsin–Stout	Menomonie, Wisconsin	Merged (ΣΠ)	(Note: Chapter formed from Sigma (local), established in 1946 at The Stout Institute (now the University of Wisconsin–Stout). It became the Delta Sigma chapter of Sigma Pi in 1964.)
Chi Delta	March 14, 1952 – 1961	University of Wisconsin–Whitewater	Whitewater, Wisconsin	Withdrew	(Note: Chapter formed from the Chi Delta Rho (local) fraternity, formed as Beta Kappa Nu (local) in 1929 and became the Beta chapter of Chi Delta Rho in 1939. It was reorganized as Chi Delta Rho after World War II.) (Note: Chapter disaffiliated from Delta Kappa in 1961 and became Chi Delta Rho (local) again. It became the Lambda Iota chapter of the Lambda Chi Alpha fraternity in 1965.)
Eta Phi	March 15, 1952 – 1954	University of Wisconsin–Eau Claire	Eau Claire, Wisconsin	Withdrew	(Note: Chaper formed from Eta Phi (local), established on February 16, 1949. It disaffiliated in 1954 and became Eta Phi (local) again. It became the Iota Sigma chapter of Tau Kappa Epsilon in the fall of 1963.)
Chi Gamma	April 24, 1953 – 1964	Milton College	Milton, Wisconsin	Merged (ΣΠ)	(Note: Chapter formed as a local fraternity that became the Gamma chapter of Chi Delta Rho state fraternity before World War II. It became a colony of Sigma Pi with the national merger in 1964 and its Delta Gamma chapter in 1968. It went dormant when the college closed.)
Omicron	May 12, 1953 – 1964	University of Wisconsin–Milwaukee	Milwaukee, Wisconsin	Merged (ΣΠ)	(Note: Chapter formed from Omicron Omicron Omicron (local) fraternity. It became the Delta Omicron chapter of Sigma Pi fraternity with the national merger in 1964; it has been dormant since 1972.)
Iota Alpha Sigma	1962–1965	University of Wisconsin–Oshkosh	Oshkosh, Wisconsin	Merged (ΤΚΕ)	(Note: Chapter became the Epsilon Beta chapter of Delta Sigma Phi fraternity in 1965.)
Chi Sigma	November 17, 1963 – 1965	Western State College of Colorado	Gunnison, Colorado	Merged (ΣΠ)	(Note: Chapter became the Delta Chi chapter of Sigma Pi with the national merger in 1965. It went dormant in 1972.)

== Alumni chapters ==
Alumni chapters were usually given the name of the local college chapter with the Greek letter Pi added before the local chapter name. Alumni chapters could be recognized if they had five or more men who had graduated or left school in good standing. Known alumni chapters are:

- Pi Alpha – Buffalo, New York
- Pi Beta – Cortland, New York
- Pi Kappa – Evansville, Indiana
- Pi Chi Delta – Whitewater, Wisconsin
- Pi Omicron – Milwaukee, Wisconsin
- Pi Sigma Phi – Frostburg, Maryland
- Pi Chi Gamma – Milton, Wisconsin
- Pi Epsilon – Ithaca, New York
- Pi Phi – Clarion, Pennsylvania

== Fraternity song ==
=== Hail Men of Delta Kappa ===
Words by Bill Fyfe, Music by Sam Forcucci

Hail Men of Delta Kappa

Keep your honor ever high.
Raise your heads fling out your banner
Let the colors never die.

We are brothers all DK men,
With a trust that men hold high.
It's a pledge we call good fellowship,
Let our emblem fill the sky.

Sing out with voice proclaiming,
Let our song be ever known.
We are proud to be DK men,
With an emblem all our own.

We are brothers pledged together
That our faith be ever true.
In the pledge we call good fellowship,

Men of DK here's to you.

== Notable members ==
This section includes alumni of the local Delta Kappa chapters in New York.

Name	Original chapter	Notability	Ref.
Richard Jadick	Delta Kappa (local); Ithaca College	Combat Surgeon and Bronze Star recipient	
Bill Tierney	Delta Kappa Beta (local); SUNY Cortland	NCAA lacrosse coach and player	
John Tournour	Delta Kappa Tau (local); SUNY Geneseo	Nationally syndicated sports talk radio host	

== See also ==
- List of social fraternities
