= Rocco Pendola =

Rocco Pendola is a former personality on numerous radio stations, most notably KTCK in Dallas–Fort Worth, Texas. Pendola also worked at WJJL in Niagara Falls, New York; WECK, WGR, and WMJQ in Buffalo, New York; WQAM in Miami, Florida; WTAE in Pittsburgh, Pennsylvania; the Sports Fan Radio Network, based in Las Vegas, Nevada; and KSJO in San Jose, California. Pendola is not presently employed in radio and is tending bar in Santa Monica.

== Background ==
Pendola started his radio career in 1988 at age 13 working as a producer, sports anchor, and later a disc jockey and sports talk show host on WJJL in Niagara Falls, New York. Pendola was hired at WJJL by Gary McNamara, the current host of the Midnight Trucking Network. He went to work in numerous markets, most notably Dallas–Fort Worth, where he was fired from his midday slot on KTCK ("The Ticket") in 1999.
