= Bubba the Love Sponge =

American radio personality (born 1966)

- Born: Todd Alan Clem; April 23, 1966 (age 60); Warsaw, Indiana, U.S.
- Occupation: Radio personality
- Years active: 1986–present
- Spouse: Heather Cole (2007–2011)
- Children: 1
- Website: thebubbaarmy.com

Bubba the Love Sponge Clem (born Todd Alan Clem, April 23, 1966) is an American radio personality who hosts The Bubba the Love Sponge Show on the radio station WWBA in Tampa, Florida, and the subscription service Bubba Army Radio.

== Early life ==
Todd Alan Clem was born on April 23, 1966, in Warsaw, Indiana. His father, Doug Clem, was a factory worker and his mother, Jane Edmond, a schoolbus driver and Warsaw city department head; he has a sister, Tara. Clem's parents divorced when he was young. In 1984, Clem graduated from Warsaw Community High School. He attended Indiana State University in Terre Haute, Indiana, with a plan to go into dentistry, but his best friend Larry Plummer told him he was better suited to a radio career, and he dropped out in his second year. Clem had a position at the campus radio station WISU, but before he became a full-time disc jockey, he worked at a van conversion shop, where he laid down carpets. He coached football at his former high school.

== Career ==
=== 1986–1992: Early career ===
In 1986, Clem worked as a bouncer and driver at Jubilation nightclub, where he picked up radio DJ "Scary" Kerry Gray, of whom he was a fan, and took him to the club. Once there, Clem noticed people gravitating toward Gray. Gray gave Clem an on-air shift as an April Fool's Day joke on April 1, 1986, at WPFR-FM in Terre Haute as Rockin' Bubba Clem, a name someone else had suggested. Clem became Gray's intern, making studio visits, answering phone calls, and sitting in on the show. He accepted a position hosting weekends soon after, and began a part-time midday shift starting on Christmas Day in 1986. He became the station's managing director. At a fraternity party, Gray called Clem a "love sponge" after witnessing the female attention Clem received.

After WPFR, Clem had a stint at WGRD-FM in Grand Rapids, Michigan. He was fired on December 21, 1988, after a 13-year-old girl called into his show and Clem made sexual remarks about her. In 1989, Clem landed a spot at KTFM in San Antonio, Texas, where he was encouraged to trademark his air name and borrowed $5,000 from his parents to file a federal trademark for "Bubba the Love Sponge". He worked evenings at WBBM-FM in Chicago, followed by a stint at WIOQ in Philadelphia from March to June 1990. The station let him go as management thought his style was not what they were looking for. Clem took legal action, and received $75,000 from WIOQ.

Clem worked nights at WXXL in Orlando, Florida, where he averaged 53,000 regular listeners. He left the station in May 1991. In August 1991, he returned to Chicago on WYTZ as the morning host, but the position lasted under three months before management rebranded the station. Clem then moved to WLUM-FM in Milwaukee, Wisconsin.

=== 1992–1996: WFLZ-FM Tampa ===
In September 1992, Clem started work from 7 to 11 p.m. at WFLZ-FM in Tampa, Florida, where his show gained popularity, particularly among teenagers. His first major contract signed during this time was worth $100,000 a year. Clem and WFLZ host Tom Steele were temporarily suspended to settle legal issues from their ongoing on-air feud.

Clem became involved in various business ventures. In December 1994, he invested $50,000 to open Sponges, an alcohol-free nightclub for teenagers in Largo, Florida. He opened a second Sponges in Spring Hill in 1995. He performed with his rap band Boyz Wit Da Bass there. Clem was involved in an endorsement deal with an Isuzu car dealership, the Bubba the Love Sponge Limousines service, a personalized paging service called the Air Bubba Beeping Network, and a premium-rate telephone line. In June 1995, Clem released an adult-oriented home video, Let Your Chia Run Wild, described as a "private collection of events documenting a lifestyle that some can only dream of" and featuring some nudity. Clem regretted his decision to release it, and WFLZ requested Clem cease its distribution. In April 1996, he opened Bubba's Beach Club, a dance club and nightspot in Ybor City. In September 1996, Clem quit WFLZ.

=== 1996–2004: WXTB Tampa ===
Clem decided to remain in Tampa, partly because he had other business ventures there. He started a morning show at WXTB in December 1996, and continued to host a pre-recorded show that was syndicated in six other cities, including Cincinnati, Toledo, Columbus, Louisville, Atlanta, and Jacksonville.

In June 1997, Jacor Communications was fined $4,000 for airing Clem's discussions of having sex with a lesbian couple on February 25. In October 1998, Citicasters, WXTB's owner, was fined $23,000 for various broadcasts, including one from May 1997 that included one of the crew describing their enema experience. This was followed by a $4,000 fine for a June 12, 1997, show that had a woman masturbating over the phone, and a $7,000 fine in 1999 for a May 28, 1998, segment that involved a caller ordering a sex doll.

By mid-1999, Clem had received four Billboard Personality of the Year awards. He was earning six figures and owned two nightclubs, one of them Planet Bubba in Spring Hill. His radio show crew included Mike "Cowhead" Calta, Mike "Manson" Waters, Whitey Pippen, Scotty the Body, Matt "Spiceboy" Loyd, Anita Wadd and Ned. In November 2000, Clem was a candidate to succeed the Pinellas County sheriff.

In January 2001, Clem's show entered national syndication on stations in Jacksonville, Orlando, Hartford, West Palm Beach, Ft. Myers, Wichita, Kansas, Shreveport, and Macon, Georgia.

In February 2002, Clem was faced with animal cruelty charges following the February 27, 2001, broadcast, which featured the Bubba's Road Kill Barbecue. The show involved the on-air castration and killing of a feral hog a hunter had captured in the station's parking lot, and sound effects of hogs feeding were broadcast to have listeners believe it was being harassed and aggravated. The hog was cooked and eaten by the crowd present. Clem, his executive producer Brent Hatley, and two others present were charged with felony animal cruelty. A jury acquitted them in March.

In January 2004, the FCC issued a $755,000 fine to Clear Channel Communications for objectionable comments from July 19, 2001. The fine consisted of the maximum $27,500 fine for each of the 26 stations that aired the segments, plus $40,000 for record-keeping violations. The segment involved sexual discussions among the cartoon characters Alvin and the Chipmunks, George Jetson, and Scooby-Doo, among others. Clem was fired on February 23. At the time he had the number one show in the Tampa area in the 18–54-year-old male demographic.

=== 2004–2010: Hiatus and Sirius Satellite Radio ===
In July 2004, Clem announced he would run for Pinellas County sheriff again.

In September 2005, Howard Stern announced the hiring of Clem to host weekday afternoons on Howard 101, his second channel on Sirius Satellite Radio, a subscription-based satellite radio service exempt from FCC regulations. The show launched on January 9, 2006.

In 2008, Clem began to host two shows a day, which lasted one year. He and his crew aired an FCC-compliant show on WHPT in the morning, followed by the uncensored program on Sirius in the afternoon. In 2009, Sirius opted for just FM replays during the week and one live uncensored show on Friday afternoons. In December 2010, Clem left Sirius after the company asked him to take an 80% pay cut in his next contract. He joined RadioIO, an Internet radio service of which his agent Thomas Bean was CEO.

=== 2008–2019: Return to terrestrial radio ===
Clem began broadcasting a live morning show from Tampa radio station WHPT 102.5 "The Bone" on January 8, 2008, which was simulcast on the Jacksonville radio station WFYV-FM 104.5 "Rock 105". During the second quarter of 2008, Bubba's show received a number one rating in the Tampa market; in 2015, the show's ratings came under investigation for possible Nielsen Ratings tampering. In December 2016 his show was canceled on his local Tampa station, WBRN.

In July 2019, it was announced that JVC Broadcasting would acquire WORL 660 AM in Greater Orlando (and its FM translator) for $900,000. As previous owner Salem is retaining rights to the WORL call letters; the WDYZ (AM) calls from a sister station were swapped to WORL. JVC announced that it planned to launch a new hot talk format on the station, Florida Man Radio, featuring Bubba the Love Sponge in the morning. Programming is also heard on a 250-watt FM translator, W288CJ at 105.5 FM.

=== 2011–present: Bubba Army Radio ===
Bubba the Love Sponge Show
- Genre: Talk show, entertainment
- Running time: 6–10am, Mon–Fri
- Country of origin: United States
- Language: English
- Home station: Bubba Army Radio, Twitch
- Opening theme: "The Beautiful People" by Marilyn Manson
- Ending theme: "The Beautiful People" by Marilyn Manson

Clem announced on January 3, 2011, he would have an internet show on RadioIO and feature several programming features throughout the day starting on January 10, 2011. On 3 January 2012 he has renewed his contract with Cox Media Group (CMG) Tampa's 102.5 FM. In August 2013 an audiotape was released on YouTube of Clem voicing a commercial for Vermont Teddy Bear. In the commercial Clem makes racist remarks; he denied being racist, saying, "I never said the word in that manner, ever." He believed the audio was leaked from "someone who had access to [his] world" and that audio bits were taken from recordings when he worked at Clear Channel. Clem's company, Bubba Radio Network, ordered the removal of the video from YouTube. It is now hosted on TMZ.

On February 13, 2017, WWBA became the new flagship station of Bubba the Love Sponge Show after WBRN dropped the show. The show also airs live on Twitch and on sister station WHBO.

In July 2019, co-host Mike "Manson" Waters, who also did the voice of Ned, left the show.

On August 23, 2019, Janessa Brazil joined the show as the new co-host. She left for family reasons on December 13, 2019.

At the start of 2020, Seth Kushner joined The Bubba The Love Sponge Show as a daily co-host, while 'Babyface' Brian Motroni, aka "Coronavirus Virus survivor", Dan Diaco, Jay Diaco and Steve Diaco make regular appearances throughout the week. Longtime contributor Lummox also makes daily appearances.

In February 2021, co-host Seth Kushner left the show.

=== Professional wrestling career ===
Bubba also got into professional wrestling. He debuted in 1993 on the independent circuit in Florida. In 1997 and 1998 he wrestled a few matches for World Championship Wrestling (WCW). He lost to Jimmy Hart by disqualification on April 18, 1999, at a WCW house show. He defeated Bill Alfonso twice in Extreme Championship Wrestling in 1999 and 2000. He wrestled in the World Wrestling Federation in December 1999 for two matches. The first was a tag match with Pat Patterson and Gerald Brisco defeating the Mean Street Posse and then a draw against Gerald Brisco. Then he defeated Mike Moran at a World Wrestling Federation House Show in Tampa, Florida on March 1, 2002, refereed by Gerald Brisco. On November 29, 2003, he teamed with Dusty Rhodes defeating Kevin Sullivan and Ralph Mosca at Full Impact Pro. His last match was a tag match with Brutus Beefcake defeated the New Assassins at Memphis Wrestling's PMG Ultimate Clash Of Legends on April 27, 2007.

==== Total Nonstop Action Wrestling ====
On January 3, 2010, Bubba announced on his Twitter account that he had signed with Total Nonstop Action Wrestling (TNA) as a backstage interviewer. He made his debut the following day on the special live, three-hour Monday night edition of TNA Impact!, participating in four short backstage segments.

On January 16, 2010, Clem tweeted about the 2010 Haiti earthquake, saying he had tired of hearing about relief efforts for the people of Haiti, writing, "Fuck Haiti", and calling the ensuing deaths of Haitians a "cleanse." He later apologized, but TNA management nonetheless temporarily removed him from the air.

On January 19, 2010, Clem claimed that he had been blindsided and physically assaulted by Awesome Kong while backstage for the taping of TNA Impact! the previous day. According to all three, the altercation was because of Clem's tweets about Haiti. On February 25, news broke that Awesome Kong had filed a lawsuit against Clem for an alleged threatening phone call. On The Cowhead Show, Clem confronted Kong.

Clem returned to TNA television as the personal interviewer of wrestling stable The Band, in late March, only to be fired from the company on April 30, 2010, as a result of the Cowhead Show incident.

=== Motorsports ===
In 2011, Clem and an investor group bought the 3/8 dirt oval Ocala Speedway, which they renamed Bubba Raceway Park.

== Legal issues ==
=== Lawsuits ===
In October 2006, Clem was sued by pornographic film actress Hope Miller, known professionally as Brooke Skye. She alleged that while performing on a radio program together with porn actress Melissa Harrington, Harrington penetrated her with an oversized sex toy against her will at Clem's urging. In 2007, a judge turned down a request by Clem's attorneys to dismiss the lawsuit, indicating that there was enough evidence that Miller had a legitimate claim. The case was eventually voluntarily dismissed with prejudice.

In 2007, Clem was sued for defamation by competitor disc jockey Todd Schnitt over on-air remarks Clem made about Schnitt's family. A court ruled in Clem's favor, and Schnitt vowed to appeal. In March 2013, after 13 hours of negotiations, Clem settled with Schnitt.

In October 2015, Nielsen sued Clem for $1 million over allegations of tampering with the ratings system by offering to pay several Nielsen panelists to manipulate the ratings by saying they listened to his show more than they did. Clem admitted to paying one person to manipulate the ratings, but Nielsen claimed he influenced several. Clem's lawyer filed a motion asking that Nielsen's lawsuit be dismissed, but it was denied by a judge. After years of trial delays, Clem and Nielsen settled out of court on July 6, 2018.

=== Hulk Hogan sex tape ===
In early 2012, it was reported that Clem had secretly filmed his wife Heather Clem and Hulk Hogan having sex in his bedroom. On October 4, 2012, Gawker released a short clip of the video. In the clip, Clem can be heard saying that the couple can "do their thing" and he will be in his office. At the end of the video, Clem can be heard telling Heather, "If we ever need to retire, here is our ticket". Hogan filed a lawsuit against the Clems for invading his privacy on October 15, 2012. Clem settled the suit on October 29, 2012. Following the settlement, Clem publicly apologized to Hogan. Hogan sued Gawker Media for publishing the tape, and a jury of six awarded Hogan more than $140 million in March 2016. Gawker announced it would appeal as it was "disappointed" that the jury was unable to hear Clem's testimony, but ultimately settled with Hogan for $31 million in November 2016.

== Personal life ==
In October 1998, Clem legally changed his name to Bubba the Love Sponge Clem. That year, he lost 148 pounds (67 kg), going from 488 pounds (221 kg) to 340 pounds (150 kg). Clem does not smoke, drink alcohol, or use drugs.

Clem has been married twice; his first marriage lasted 91 days. He said "things got sticky" after he wanted to make it in radio and had to develop in different cities and his wife preferred to stay in Terre Haute. In January 2007, Clem married model Heather Cole at the First Baptist Church of St. Petersburg, Florida. Hulk Hogan was Clem's best man. The couple agreed to separate in March 2011, and Clem filed for divorce that September. Clem has a son from a previous relationship; Hogan was his godfather.

In 2012, Clem started a four-year relationship with Nicole L'Ange. In February 2017, she requested an order of protection against Clem, claiming he had abused her "emotionally and physically". Clem denied the allegations, and the case was settled out of court that March.

In June 2017, Clem put his St. Petersburg home up for sale.
