= WJBR (AM) =

Radio station in Seffner–Tampa, Florida

- Seffner, Florida; United States
- Broadcast area: Tampa Bay
- Frequency: 1010 kHz
- Branding: Florida Alumni Radio

Programming
- Format: Sports/talk

Ownership
- Owner: Beasley Broadcast Group; (Beasley Media Group Licenses, LLC)
- Sister stations: WLLD; WQYK-FM; WRBQ-FM; WYUU

History
- First air date: November 7, 1960
- Former call signs: WINQ (1960–1981); WCBF (1981–1988); WQYK (1988–2004); WBZZ (2004–2006); WQYK (2006–2012); WHFS (2012–2023)
- Call sign meaning: warehoused from WJBR-FM in Wilmington, Delaware

Technical information
- Licensing authority: FCC
- Facility ID: 28629
- Class: B
- Power: 50,000 watts (day); 5,000 watts (night)
- Transmitter coordinates: 27°59′25″N 82°15′6″W
- Translator: See § Translator
- Repeater: 104.7 WRBQ-FM HD2 (Tampa)

Links
- Public license information: Public file; LMS
- Webcast: Listen live
- Website: flalumniradio.com

WJBR (1010 kHz) is an AM radio station licensed to Seffner, Florida, United States, serving the Tampa Bay market with a sports/talk format known as "Florida Alumni Radio". Owned by the Beasley Broadcast Group, the station's studios are located on Executive Center Drive in St. Petersburg.

By day, WJBR transmits with 50,000 watts, the maximum for commercial AM stations. As 1010 AM is a clear channel frequency reserved for Class A stations CFRB in Toronto and CBR in Calgary, WJBR must reduce power to 5,000 watts at night. Its transmitter is off Martin Luther King Jr. Boulevard (Florida State Road 574) in Seffner, using a directional antenna with three-tower array to protect other stations from interference. It is directional towards the east and west to protect WJXL in Jacksonville–which also operates on 1010 AM–by day. WJBR's call sign was granted by the Federal Communications Commission on September 19, 2023. It is also heard on one FM translator, at 92.1 MHz in Tampa.

== History ==
=== MOR and talk ===
The station signed on the air on November 7, 1960, as WINQ. It was founded by Rex Rand, the owner of WINZ in Miami.

In its early days, WINQ was a network affiliate of the Mutual Broadcasting System and carried a middle-of-the-road (MOR) music format. In 1967, WINQ became the first station in Tampa Bay to offer an all-talk format, with network news and other programming from CBS Radio (which would later own this station). WINQ switched to a country music format in 1971, after the station was losing money on the talk programming.

=== Christian programming ===
By 1974, WINQ had changed to a Christian radio station, featuring pre-recorded religious programing, with southern gospel music filling the breaks. In 1975, after an influx of call-in requests to Kevin MacKenzie's "LoveTree" Jesus Music Show, he and station manager Phil Scott agreed to continue in the direction of Christian rock. With the assistance of program director Bill Brown, WINQ became a full-time Christian contemporary station with live announcers, and launched what became the first commercially licensed Christian rock radio station in the country.

In late 1978, following Rand's death in a helicopter crash, the station was sold to different owners, who switched the format back to traditional religious programming, as WCBF ("We're Christians By Faith"), dropping the Contemporary Christian music format and again featuring Christian talk and teaching programs produced by area churches.

=== CBS ownership and Howard Stern ===
In 1987, Infinity Broadcasting, which owned WQYK-FM, acquired WCBF. It was relaunched a year later as WQYK, returning it to a country format. During most hours, it simulcast its FM sister station WQYK-FM. The simulcast did not last long.

The station has undergone many format changes since then, alternating between country, talk and sports radio. In July 2004, the station switched to a hot talk format as WBZZ, 1010 The Buzz, after acquiring the rights to the syndicated Howard Stern Show. However, soon after Stern left for satellite radio in January 2006, the station switched to a classic country format. Then, it changed back to all-sports as WQYK on August 10, 2007. Nanci "The Fabulous Sports Babe" Donnellan is one of WQYK's most notable alumni. The station served as Donnellan's flagship during her show's run on the now-defunct Sports Fan Radio Network, from 1997 to 2001.

WQYK's sports format moved to WHFS-FM 98.7 on August 2, 2012, under the branding SportsRadio 98.7 The Fan. The WHFS call sign had previously been used on co-owned stations in Washington, D. C. and Baltimore and was "parked" or "warehoused" on a co-owned station in West Palm Beach. Concurrent with the move, WQYK changed its call sign to WHFS to match the FM station. The two stations simulcast until January 2, 2013, when the AM station became a full-time affiliate of CBS Sports Radio. Among the new hosts was Donnellan, who was heard in overnights.

=== Moneytalk Radio ===
"Moneytalk 1010" logo before translator sign on

On October 2, 2014, CBS Radio announced that it would trade all of the company's radio stations in Charlotte and Tampa (including WHFS), as well as WIP in Philadelphia, to the Beasley Broadcast Group in exchange for five stations in Miami and Philadelphia. The swap was completed on December 1, 2014.

On December 31, 2014, at 10 a.m., WHFS dropped CBS Sports Radio and flipped to a simulcast of Boca Raton sister station WSBR's Moneytalk Radio programming.

WHFS aired financial and business shows under this format, some of which was paid brokered programming. Nationally syndicated shows included The Ramsey Show with Dave Ramsey, The Mark Levin Show and The Ken Colman Show. WHFS carried The Schnitt Show with Todd Schnitt until its end in July 2023. Weekends included programs on pets, gardening, religion, health, travel, food and wine. Most hours began with an update from ABC News Radio.

=== Podcast Radio US ===
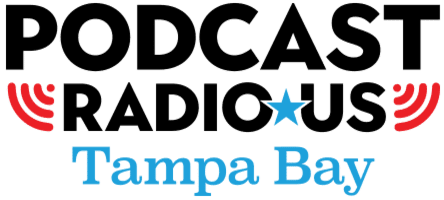
Logo as "Podcast Radio Tampa Bay"

On September 19, 2023, WHFS changed its call sign to WJBR, which was warehoused from sister station WJBR-FM in Wilmington, Delaware, which Beasley was in the process of selling to VCY America. Three days later, on September 22, WJBR flipped to an all-podcast format as "Podcast Radio US". WJBR was one of four Beasley stations to debut the format that day under an agreement between Beasley and the podcast originating company, the United Kingdom-based Podcast Radio Network.

=== Florida Alumni Radio ===
On August 20, 2025, WJBR flipped back to sports/talk, branded as "Florida Alumni Radio". The format focuses on content from local colleges, including the regionally syndicated “Miller & Moulton” morning show hosted by Mark Miller and David Moulton, based at Beasley’s WBCN in Fort Myers. It also carries content from the University of South Florida, including simulcasts of football games from WRBQ, as well as coach’s shows, alumni news, and other special programming.

== Translator ==
Broadcast translator for WJBR
Call sign	Frequency	City of license	FID	ERP (W)	HAAT	Class	FCC info
W221DW	92.1 FM	Tampa, Florida	138681	99	75 m (246 ft)	D	LMS
