= WKVZ =

Contemporary Christian radio station in Florida

- Holmes Beach, Florida; United States
- Broadcast area: Tampa Bay Area
- Frequency: 98.7 MHz (HD Radio)
- Branding: K-Love

Programming
- Format: Christian contemporary
- Subchannels: HD2: Air1; HD3: K-Love Pop
- Network: K-Love

Ownership
- Owner: Educational Media Foundation; (K-Love Inc.)

History
- First air date: December 7, 1989
- Former call signs: WAYP (1989–1992); WISP (1992–1998); WLLD (1998–2009); WSJT (2009–2012); WHFS (2012); WHFS-FM (2012–2015); WBRN-FM (2015–2017); WPBB (2017–2025)
- Call sign meaning: "K-Love"

Technical information
- Licensing authority: FCC
- Facility ID: 18527
- Class: C2
- ERP: 47,000 watts
- HAAT: 141 meters (463 ft)
- Transmitter coordinates: 27.843°N 82.814°W

Links
- Public license information: Public file; LMS
- Webcast: Listen live
- Website: klove.com

WKVZ (98.7 FM) is a noncommercial radio station licensed to Holmes Beach, Florida, United States, and serving the Tampa Bay media market. It is owned by the Educational Media Foundation (d/b/a K-Love Inc.) and is part of the K-Love network. The transmitter is located San Martin Blvd in St. Petersburg.

== History ==
=== WAYP/WISP/WLLD/WSJT ===
The station signed on the air on December 7, 1989, under the call sign WAYP. The call letters changed to WISP on April 2, 1992. As both WAYP and WISP, the station played mostly easy listening and soft adult contemporary music. On May 15, 1998, after stunting with a loop of "Wild Thing" by Tone Loc, the rhythmic contemporary format of "WiLD 98.7" debuted under new call letters WLLD.

On August 19, 2009, at 5 p.m., "WiLD 98.7" and "Smooth Jazz 94.1 WSJT" switched frequencies, with 94.1 becoming "WiLD 94.1" and 98.7 becoming "Smooth Jazz 98.7 WSJT". Under the ownership of CBS Radio, the smooth jazz format evolved into a format known as smooth AC, a mix of urban AC and soft AC with a few instrumental jazz songs included.

=== Play 98.7/The Fan ===
On August 31, 2010, at 3 p.m., the station dropped smooth AC in favor of Adult Top 40/CHR as "Play 98.7". The first song on "Play" was "Use Somebody" by Kings of Leon. The smooth jazz format was subsequently moved to HD Radio frequency 98.7-HD2. This would change on December 18, 2013, when the sports talk format from WFAN in New York City moved from 94.1-HD3 to 98.7-HD2, while the smooth jazz format was relocated to 94.1-HD2.

Due to low ratings with "Play", CBS Radio announced on June 20, 2012, that WSJT would flip to sports talk in August, branded as "The Fan". On July 25, 2012, CBS said it would debut the new format on August 2.

On that day, at 11 a.m., "Play" signed off with "Closing Time" by Semisonic, and 98.7 FM began a half hour of stunting with songs usually played at sports games, followed by a half-hour long monologue of the history of sports teams in the Tampa Bay area, which would lead into the official launch of "The Fan" at Noon. At the same time as the format flip, WSJT changed call letters to WHFS-FM. The WHFS call letters were held by former sister station WUUB in West Palm Beach and were heritage call letters for a long-time alternative rock station in the Washington–Baltimore area. The station simulcast on sister station WHFS (1010 AM) until January 3, 2013, when the AM became a 24/7 affiliate of the new CBS Sports Radio network. WHFS-FM held the rights to carry University of South Florida sports in the Tampa Bay area.

=== Bubba 98.7/No Rules Rock ===
On October 2, 2014, CBS Radio announced that it would trade its stations in Charlotte and Tampa (including WHFS-FM), as well as WIP (AM) in Philadelphia, to the Beasley Broadcast Group in exchange for five stations in Miami and Philadelphia. The swap was completed on December 1, 2014.

On December 4, 2014, Beasley released the entire "Fan" airstaff, and at 3 p.m. that day, following The Jim Rome Show, the station dropped the sports format and began stunting with Christmas music as "The New 98.7". On December 26, the station shifted its stunting to a broad mix of music from different genres.

After months of speculation, longtime local morning personality Bubba the Love Sponge returned to the Tampa airwaves on 98.7 FM on January 5, the same day his non-compete with Cox Radio ended. Bubba's show aired live from 6 to 10 a.m. After Bubba's return show on the 5th, the station began airing repeats of the program the rest of the day, while the station built a permanent format outside of his show. On February 2, at 10 a.m., the station debuted a Rock-leaning Variety Hits format billed as "Bubba 98.7", which featured a mix of current and recent rock songs, along with selections of older music personally picked by Bubba himself. The first song played under the new format was AC/DC's "It's a Long Way to the Top (If You Wanna Rock 'n' Roll)". The station's call sign changed to WBRN-FM on February 4.

On December 9, 2015, WBRN-FM rebranded as "98.7 No Rules Rock".

=== B98.7 ===
Due to low ratings, on December 12, 2016, at Midnight, WBRN-FM dropped Bubba's show, along with the rock format, and began stunting with Christmas music again, this time as "Santa 98.7". (Bubba's syndicated show would be picked up by WWBA in February 2017.) At Midnight on December 26, the station shifted its stunting to a mix of songs from various genres related to money, power, and/or authority, branded as "98.7 Donald FM".

On January 5, 2017, at 5:45 p.m., WBRN-FM officially flipped to adult contemporary as "B98.7", with "Hello" by Adele being the first song played. Chadd and Kristi Thomas, long-time morning hosts on new rival WWRM, resigned the week prior from that station, and began hosting mornings on "B" beginning February 6, and voice-tracked the station's 10,000 songs in a row launch until that date.

On February 1, 2017, WBRN-FM changed call letters to WPBB to match their new branding, though the station had been identifying itself as WPBB since late January.

=== 98.7 The Shark ===
On December 26, 2018, at Midnight, the station flipped again to classic rock as "98.7 The Shark", using the slogan "The Next Generation Of Classic Rock". The first song played on "The Shark" was AC/DC's "For Those About To Rock (We Salute You)". The station carried "Dave & Chuck the Freak" in mornings, syndicated from Detroit sister station WRIF.

=== K-Love ===
On June 30, 2025, Beasley announced the station would be sold to K-Love Inc., and the station’s format would be changed to Contemporary Christian music.

At 10 p.m. on September 28, 2025, “The Shark” signed off with “Closing Time” by Semisonic, and WPBB went silent. The next morning, the station returned to the air broadcasting “K-Love” programming. On September 29, 2025, K-Love affiliate WKVZ in Bangor, Maine, filed an application with the FCC to exchange its call letters with WPBB, which the commission approved the next day.
