= 820 AM =

AM radio frequency

The following radio stations broadcast on AM frequency 820 kHz:

== In Argentina ==
- LRA8 in Formosa
- LRI208 Estación 820 in Lomas de Zamora, Buenos Aires
- LU24 in Tres Arroyos, Buenos Aires

== In Canada ==
- CHAM in Hamilton, Ontario - 50 kW daytime, 10 kW nighttime, transmitter located at 43.116111°N 79.776944°W

== In Guatemala (Channel 29) ==
- TGTO in Guatemala City

== In Mexico ==
- XEBM-AM in San Luis Potosí, San Luis Potosí
- XEGRC-AM in Coyuca de Catalan, Guerrero
- XEBA-AM in Guadalajara, Jalisco

== In the United States ==
Stations in bold are clear-channel stations.

Call sign	City of license	Facility ID	Class	Daytime power (kW)	Nighttime power (kW)	Critical hours power (kW)	Unlimited power (kW)	Transmitter coordinates
**KCBF**	Fairbanks, Alaska	49645	A				10	64.878889°N 147.668333°W
KGNW	Burien-Seattle, Washington	28819	B	50	5			47.433333°N 122.467222°W
KUTR	Taylorsville, Utah	129372	B	50	2.5	50		40.33°N 112.069167°W
**WBAP**	Fort Worth, Texas	71200	A				50	32.610556°N 97.166667°W
WBKK	Wilton, Minnesota	160559	B	10	0.75			47.391389°N 95.077778°W
WCPT	Willow Springs, Illinois	16849	B	5.8	1.5			41.981389°N 87.772222°W (daytime); 41.541667°N 88.034167°W (nighttime)
WJFN	Chester, Virginia	27440	B	10	1			37.381667°N 77.427778°W
WNYC	New York, New York	73357	B	10	1			40.752778°N 74.104167°W
WPGO	Horseheads, New York	10687	B	4.1	0.85			42.153889°N 76.846389°W
WSHE	Frederick, Maryland	47104	B	4.3	0.43			39.411667°N 77.472222°W
WSWI	Evansville, Indiana	68924	D	0.25				37.964722°N 87.668333°W
WVSG	Columbus, Ohio	66186	B	6.5	0.79			39.909167°N 83.056667°W
WWBA	Largo, Florida	51971	B	50	1			27.908333°N 82.780833°W

== In Brazil ==
- Rádio Aparecida in Aparecida, São Paulo
