= Todd Schnitt =

American talk radio host (born 1966)

Todd Andrew Schnitt
- Born: January 24, 1966 (age 60); Manhattan, New York City, United States
- Education: Ithaca College
- Occupation: Radio personality
- Years active: 1982–present
- Spouse: Michelle Schnitt
- Children: 2
- Website: www.schnittshow.com

Todd Andrew Schnitt (born January 24, 1966), known professionally as Todd Schnitt and MJ Kelli, is an American radio DJ and was previously a conservative talk radio host. Beginning in October 2020, he began hosting the "MJ Morning Show" on "Q105," 104.7 WRBQ-FM in Tampa. Until July 2023, he hosted The Schnitt Show, an afternoon drive time talk program whose flagship station was WHFS 1010 AM in Tampa, and was nationally syndicated by Compass Media Networks. He co-hosted a morning drive time talk show on WOR 710 AM in New York with Len Berman from January 2015 until October 19, 2017.

Schnitt was born in New York City and raised in Nanuet, New York, and Virginia Beach, Virginia. He is a graduate of Frank W. Cox High School in Virginia Beach. He has worked in radio since he was 16 and has used the stage name "MJ Kelli" in hosting shows at the Hampton Roads, New York City, and Tampa markets from 1986 to 2012 and beginning again in October 2020. From 1994 to 2012, Schnitt was morning drive time host of The MJ Morning Show (known before 2001 as The MJ and BJ Morning Show) at Tampa top 40 station WFLZ-FM and select other Clear Channel Communications stations. In 2001, Schnitt launched an afternoon talk program The Schnitt Show on Miami radio station WIOD. The Schnitt Show later expanded to other markets, including Tampa station WFLA in 2002. The show now airs live on Money Talk 1010 WHFS from 3-6 p.m. Eastern.

== Early life and broadcast career beginnings ==
Schnitt was born in Manhattan and grew up in Nanuet, New York. Schnitt has credited New York City station MusicRadio 77 WABC with his interest in radio broadcasting. As a young boy growing up in Nanuet, New York in the early 1970s, Schnitt became fascinated by WABC and listened as much as possible. In late 1976, Schnitt's family moved to Virginia Beach, Virginia.

In 1982, at the age of 16, Schnitt landed his first part-time job at WCPK in Chesapeake, Virginia. During his high school years he worked at numerous Hampton Roads, Virginia, area stations including WVAB, WNIS and WNVZ (Z-104). Schnitt attended Ithaca College in New York and worked at the Cornell student-run station, WVBR.

In 1986, he returned to the Hampton Roads area and scored his first full-time radio job at WRSR-FM (97Star), which soon reverted to the callsign WGH-FM. The name MJ Kelli was first used at WGH-FM. The name MJ was created because the 97Star program director was adamant that Todd Schnitt was not a good radio name.

In 1988, Schnitt was recruited to leave WGH-FM (97 Star) and cross the street to Top 40 rival radio station WNVZ-FM (Z104) because Schnit's 6-10 p.m. Eastern nighttime show on WGH was the only show beating WNVZ in the nighttime ratings

In 1989, after just a little over a year at WNVZ, Schnitt was hired by Scott Shannon at Pirate Radio, KQLZ in Los Angeles as creative director, assistant program director and morning show cast member. Schnitt later rejoined Shannon at the revamping of WPLJ, New York which had originally signed on as Mojo Radio in April, 1991.

Schnitt left New York City in October 1992 to start The MJ Kelli Morning Show, his first morning-drive program (6-10 a.m.) on WOVV (Star 95.5), West Palm Beach, Florida. In February 1994, he was brought to Tampa, Florida to anchor the new morning show on WFLZ-FM (The Power Pig). Schnitt was teamed up with BJ Harris, the Power Pig's program director, to form the MJ and BJ Morning Show. Harris left the show on February 7, 2001. The show was renamed The MJ Morning Show.

== The MJ Morning Show ==
Schnitt hosted The MJ Morning Show under his "MJ Kelli" personality. The show was broadcast Monday through Friday 6-10 am on flagship WFLZ-FM—Tampa and syndicated to KSLZ—St. Louis (Z107.7), WKSL—Jacksonville, Florida and WFKS—Melbourne, Florida (95.1 KISS-FM). The show focused on current events, lifestyle news, pop-culture and personal experiences. The program had been mostly a talk and humor format but played about two songs per hour.

Schnitt relaunched the "MJ Morning Show" in Tampa on October 5, 2020, on 104.7 WRBQ-FM with returning cast members Fester and Froggy along with newcomer Roxanne Wilder.

It was announced on January 19, 2012, that Todd Schnitt would be doing the last "MJ morning show" broadcast on February 17, 2012. He continued hosting his political talk show The Schnitt Show, which broadcasts afternoons.

In October 2019, Schnitt teamed up with two former members of the show, Fester and Froggy, to launch an "MJ Morning Show Reunion Podcast" which was discontinued in November 2020 after the live morning show was relaunched the month prior on WRBQ-FM. He also started a podcast with Fark.com founder Drew Curtis called "Fark and Schnitt" in September 2019 and discontinued it in the summer of 2020.

== The Schnitt Show ==
The Schnitt Show was a conservative radio talk show that aired Monday through Friday from 3-6 p.m. Eastern Time. It was based at Tampa's "Money Talk 1010 WHFS" and also aired on 92.1 and 103.1 FM in the Tampa/St. Petersburg area. Schnitt described himself as a "fiercely independent conservative with libertarian influence." The show consisted of news, political commentary, lifestyle and pop-culture with sound bites and parody material. The Schnitt Show was syndicated by Compass Media Networks and was heard on nearly 60 stations across America.

The program first launched on October 1, 2001, on WIOD in Miami. After The Glenn Beck Radio Program was discontinued on WFLA, Schnitt took over the 3-6 p.m. slot on 970 WFLA in Tampa starting January 3, 2002.

In 2013, the flagship station for The Schnitt Show was moved to 1250 WHNZ. In October 2020, the show's flagship station moved to Money Talk 1010 WHFS in Tampa. Schnitt joined WRBQ-FM to relaunch the "MJ Morning Show" on Q105 and now works for Beasley Media Group.

In June 2023, Schnitt announced he would be ending "The Schnitt Show" on July 28, 2023, after nearly 22 years. After working two radio jobs, 6 to 10 a.m. weekdays on Q105 and 3 to 6 p.m. on "The Schnitt Show," he decided to concentrate on the morning program and leave his afternoon talk radio gig.

== Personal life ==
Todd Schnitt is married to Michelle Schnitt, an attorney and former Hillsborough County prosecutor. They have two children, Chloe (b. 2001) and Julian (b. 2004) as well as two Jack Russell Terriers. Schnitt is also a self-described automobile enthusiast and an avid scuba diver and skier.

Schnitt is a 2007 graduate of the Tampa FBI Citizens Academy, an invitation-only program offered by numerous FBI field offices around the country. In that same year, Schnitt flew with the Blue Angels in a two-seater F/A-18 Hornet jet #7 from their NAS Pensacola headquarters (video).

Schnitt has also experienced a jet-assisted takeoff (JATO) in "Fat Albert," the Blue Angels' C-130T Hercules transport at MacDill Air Force Base in Tampa.
