= WRBQ-FM =

Classic hits radio station in Tampa, Florida

- Tampa, Florida; United States
- Broadcast area: Tampa Bay Area
- Frequency: 104.7 MHz (HD Radio)
- Branding: Tampa Bay's Q105

Programming
- Format: Classic hits
- Subchannels: HD2: Sports (WJBR)

Ownership
- Owner: Beasley Broadcast Group; (Beasley Media Group Licenses, LLC)
- Sister stations: WJBR; WLLD; WQYK-FM; WYUU

History
- First air date: June 1954
- Former call signs: WPKM (1954–1972); WEZX (1972–1973)
- Call sign meaning: Ralph Beaver (station engineer) Quality

Technical information
- Licensing authority: FCC
- Facility ID: 11943
- Class: C1
- ERP: 100,000 watts
- HAAT: 174 meters (571 ft)

Links
- Public license information: Public file; LMS
- Webcast: Listen live
- Website: myq105.com

WRBQ-FM (104.7 FM, "Q105") is a commercial radio station licensed to Tampa, Florida, United States, airing a classic hits format. Owned by the Beasley Broadcast Group, its studios are on Executive Center Drive North, near Gandy Boulevard in St. Petersburg.

WRBQ's transmitter is sited on South 50th Street off South Tamiami Trail in Palm River-Clair Mel. WRBQ broadcasts in HD Radio; the HD2 subchannel airs an all-podcast format, simulcasting WJBR.

== History ==
=== WPKM and WEZX (1954–1973) ===
The station signed on the air in June 1954. Its original call sign was WPKM. It was owned by Frank Knorr, Jr., and was a rare stand-alone FM station not associated with an AM or TV station. The studios were in the Bayshore Royal Hotel. Its power was only 10,500 watts, a fraction of its current output.

By the 1960s, WPKM was airing a beautiful music format, playing quarter-hour sweeps of soft instrumental cover songs of popular adult music, along with Broadway and Hollywood show tunes. It switched its call letters in 1972 to WEZX to reflect its easy listening sounds.

=== Top 40 (1973–1993) ===
The station switched to a Top 40 format as WRBQ ("Q105") on December 13, 1973. The first song on "Q105" was "If You're Ready (Come Go with Me)" by The Staple Singers. Beginning in 1977, popular disc jockey Cleveland Wheeler served as the morning host.

The station hired Scott Shannon as program director in 1981. Shannon and Wheeler soon developed the first morning zoo radio show in the U.S. The two decided to work up a wilder show together, with plenty of comedy and characters. It was founded on their own playful, irreverent, and provocative interaction, with spontaneous bits of parody leavened with straight news. They called the show the Q Morning Zoo, and it quickly became a hit. At its height, it had 85 people working to produce it. Dave Saint, Jack Harris, Bill Garcia, Uncle Johnny, Alan O’Brien, Tedd Webb, Pat McKay, Steve Kelly, and Mason Dixon were all involved with the station as on-air personalities. Q105 quickly overtook WLCY-FM, which had signed on three years earlier with an automated contemporary hits format.

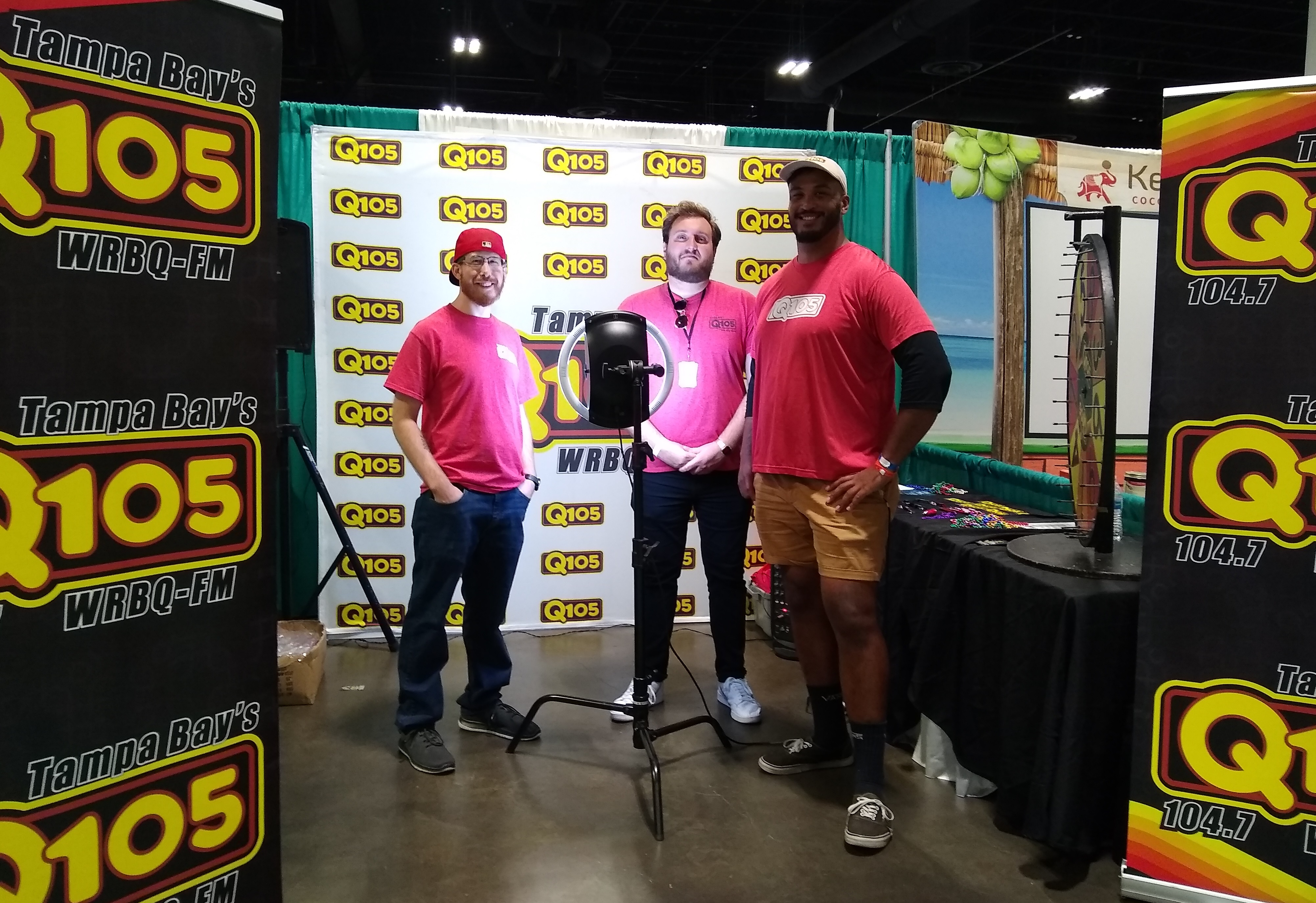
The WRBQ-FM, Q105 team (left to right, Andy, Stephen, and Andrew) at the Gasparilla Distance Classic Expo in February 2020.

According to engineer Ralph Beaver, the station's call sign was created when they were looking for a set of unique call letters and tossing out ideas, he suggested ‘RB’ (which happened to be his initials). Southern Broadcasting, which then owned the station, had just signed on WRVQ in Richmond, Virginia, and ‘RB’ was available, creating a call sign that sounded similar to its sister station.

When it began its Top 40 format, WRBQ-FM was owned by Southern Broadcasting. In 1978, the station was purchased by Harte-Hanks, then in 1983, by Edens Broadcasting, headed by former Southern Broadcasting and Harte-Hanks executive Gary Edens. WRBQ added an AM simulcast on 1380 AM that same year.

For 20 years, Q105 was a Mainstream Top 40/CHR station and dominated the ratings in Tampa. The station maintained its popularity until September 1989, when crosstown Oldies station WFLZ-FM changed to an aggressive Top 40/CHR format called Power 93, The Power Pig. Part of WFLZ's plan was to mock and belittle Q105. WFLZ had billboards all over Tampa saying "Screw The Q" with the letter "Q" and a large red screw through it. Q105 had faced competition beforehand against crosstown WZNE (Z98) for a short period of time during the mid-1980s, but it prevailed.

Q105 continued on against The Power Pig for a few more years, but was unable to regain the ratings the station once enjoyed. WRBQ tried moving slightly in a rhythmic direction (much like WFLZ) in April 1990, and then moved towards an adult lean in February 1993. In addition, Edens was also running into financial trouble, partially related due to the fallout from WFLZ's competition. In January 1992, WRBQ (AM) split from the simulcast and flipped to the satellite-fed urban AC service "The Touch". Also in 1992, Edens decided to sell all of its stations. WRBQ-AM-FM were purchased by Clear Channel Communications in July of that year.

=== Country (1993–2002) ===
At 1:05 p.m. on April 2, 1993, after playing "Real Love" by Jody Watley and "Happy Trails" by Roy Rogers, WRBQ-FM flipped to a country format, which began with a weekend of all-Garth Brooks music. The country station kept the "Q105" name and logo (albeit colored in a red, white and blue motif). The switch to country was an immediate ratings success, climbing from 13th place to 2nd, beating every station except then-rival (now sister station) country competitor WQYK-FM. WRBQ was briefly renamed "105 The Bee" in the late 1990s. It continued as a successful country radio station until the early 2000s.

In February 1999, as a result of the merger of Clear Channel and Jacor, WRBQ-FM was sold to Infinity Broadcasting, later CBS Radio, and became WQYK's sister station. (WRBQ AM was sold to ABC and flipped to Radio Disney.)

=== Oldies (2002–2005) ===
Former WRBQ program director Mason Dixon was program director of sister station WYUU, an oldies station, with a weaker signal than WRBQ and most other Tampa FM stations. Dixon lobbied Infinity management to move the oldies format to WRBQ. On April 18, 2002, WRBQ and WYUU swapped formats. WYUU became "Country 92.5", while WRBQ became an oldies station as “Oldies 104.7”, playing many of the 1970s and 1980s hits it once played when they were current. (WYUU has since flipped to Spanish-language contemporary hits.)

=== Classic hits (2005–present) ===
The station returned to the "Q105" branding in July 2005. By 2010, the station removed songs from the 1960s and added more 1980s titles, making the transition to classic hits ("The Greatest Hits of All Time").

In 2008, Scott Walker was hired to be WRBQ's on-air program director and midday host. This was done to allow Mason Dixon to focus entirely on his morning show duties. In 2013, Brian Thomas programmed WRBQ and sister station WQYK for a short period of time. Tee Gentry later took over programming duties on an interim basis. Ted Cannarozzi became the official PD in January 2016.

In recent years, WRBQ-FM has brought back jingles from its Top 40 days. These include cuts from the "Positron", "Outstanding", "The Rock", "FM", "The Flame Thrower", "Warp Factor", "Red Hot", "Power Station", "Skywave", "Turbo Z", and "Z World" packages, all from JAM Creative Productions. The Q105 jingle melody, in its present incarnation, was modeled after that of "Z100," WHTZ in New York. (The jingles have since been discontinued.)

On October 2, 2014, CBS Radio announced that it would trade all of the company's radio stations in Charlotte and Tampa (including WRBQ), as well as WIP in Philadelphia, to the Beasley Broadcast Group. This was in exchange for five stations in Miami and Philadelphia. The swap was completed on December 1, 2014.

On October 5, 2020, the station announced the return of the MJ Morning Show, which originally aired on WFLZ from 1994 until 2012. The MJ in the show's title is MJ Kelli, who is also known as conservative talk radio host Todd Schnitt, his real name. The addition of the MJ Morning Show resulted in Mason Dixon moving back to the afternoon drive time slot. In October 2022, Dixon departed the station as part of nation-wide layoffs by Beasley Media Group.

=== Buccaneers broadcasts ===
At one time, WRBQ was the flagship radio station for the Tampa Bay Buccaneers of the National Football League. That may have made it the first Top 40 station in the U.S. to carry live play-by-play sporting events. Jesse Ventura, the former professional wrestler and actor who later became governor of Minnesota, was one of the team's color analysts.

Buccaneers broadcasts are now heard on WXTB, an active rock station owned by iHeartMedia.

=== Bulls broadcasts ===
In 2025, WRBQ became the flagship station for South Florida Bulls football games.
