= WQYK-FM =

Country music radio station in St. Petersburg–Tampa, Florida

Coordinates: 27.932°N 82.401°W

- St. Petersburg, Florida; United States
- Broadcast area: Tampa, Florida
- Frequency: 99.5 MHz (HD Radio)
- RDS: 995QYK
- Branding: 99.5 QYK

Programming
- Language: English
- Format: Country music
- Subchannels: HD2: Country "NuTune Country"

Ownership
- Owner: Beasley Broadcast Group; (Beasley Media Group Licenses, LLC)
- Sister stations: WJBR; WLLD; WRBQ-FM; WYUU

History
- First air date: May 1958
- Former call signs: WTCX (1958–1972)
- Call sign meaning: tribute to former sister station WQIK in Jacksonville

Technical information
- Licensing authority: FCC
- Facility ID: 28619
- Class: C1
- ERP: 100,000 watts
- HAAT: 174 meters (571 ft)

Links
- Public license information: Public file; LMS
- Webcast: Listen live
- Website: 995qyk.com

WQYK-FM (99.5 MHz, "99.5 QYK") is a commercial country music radio station in Tampa, Florida. It is under ownership of Beasley Broadcast Group. Its studios are in St. Petersburg (city of license) while its transmitter is east of Palm River-Clair Mel.

== History ==
WQYK signed on the air in May 1958 as WTCX, a 31,000-watt classical music station and the first Tampa Bay FM to introduce stereo sound. It originally broadcast from a tiny studio at the transmitter site at 5750 North Haines Road in St. Petersburg, Florida, and was owned by Trans-Chord company.

The call letters changed to the current WQYK-FM in 1972, and began its long running country music format. Infinity Broadcasting would buy the station from Lake Huron Broadcasting in January 1987. Infinity would be renamed CBS Radio in December 2005.

On October 2, 2014, CBS Radio announced that it would trade all of their radio stations located in Charlotte and Tampa (including WQYK), as well as WIP in Philadelphia, to the Beasley Broadcast Group in exchange for five stations located in Miami and Philadelphia. The swap was completed on December 1, 2014. Shortly after the swap, the station branding was changed from "99.5 WQYK" to "99.5 QYK".
