= Egypt Lake, Florida =

- Unincorporated community
- Location within Florida Location within the United States
- Coordinates: 28°1′1″N 82°29′43″W
- Country: United States
- State: Florida
- County: Hillsborough
- Time zone: UTC-5 (Eastern (EST))
  - Summer (DST): UTC-4 (EDT)
- GNIS feature ID: 1867138

Egypt Lake is an unincorporated community in northwestern Hillsborough County, Florida, United States. It is located within the census-designated place of Egypt Lake-Leto. It was a separate census-designated place from 1970 to 1990. The population as of the 1990 census was 14,580. The ZIP code for Egypt Lake is 33614.

== Geography and transportation ==
Historical population
Census	Pop.	Note	%±
1970	7,556		—
1980	11,032		46.0%
1990	14,580		32.2%

Egypt Lake is located at 28 degrees north, 82.5 degrees west (28.016963, -82.495373); or approximately four miles northwest of Tampa. The elevation for the community is 45 feet (14 m) above sea level.

Egypt Lake boundaries include the city of Tampa to the south and east, Carrollwood to the north, and Dale Mabry Highway to the west.

Some of the major surface roads serving the community include:

- Dale Mabry Highway
- Waters Avenue
- Himes Avenue
- Lambright Street

== Education ==
The community of Egypt Lake is served by Hillsborough County Schools. Egypt Lake Elementary School is located within the community.
