= WTTA =

Television station in St. Petersburg, Florida

- St. Petersburg–Tampa, Florida; United States
- City: St. Petersburg, Florida
- Channels: Digital: 9 (VHF), shared with WFLA-TV; Virtual: 38
- Branding: The CW Tampa Bay

Programming
- Affiliations: 38.1: The CW; 38.2: Cozi TV

Ownership
- Owner: Nexstar Media Group; (Nexstar Media Inc.)
- Sister stations: WFLA-TV, WSNN-LD; Tegna: WTSP

History
- Founded: January 31, 1985
- First air date: June 21, 1991
- Former channel numbers: Analog: 38 (UHF, 1991–2009); Digital: 57 (UHF, 2002–2009), 38 (UHF, 2009–2010), 32 (UHF, 2010–2018), 7 (VHF, 2018–2020)
- Former affiliations: Independent (1991–1999); Fox Kids (secondary, 1994–2001); The WB (1999–2006); MyNetworkTV (primary, 2006–2023)
- Call sign meaning: "Television Tampa"

Technical information
- Licensing authority: FCC
- Facility ID: 4108
- ERP: 41 kW
- HAAT: 465.3 m (1,527 ft)
- Transmitter coordinates: 27°50′33″N 82°15′44″W

Links
- Public license information: Public file; LMS
- Website: www.wfla.com/the-cw-tampa-bay/

WTTA (channel 38) is a television station licensed to St. Petersburg, Florida, United States, serving as the Tampa Bay area's local outlet for The CW. It is owned by Nexstar Media Group alongside NBC affiliate WFLA-TV (channel 8) and WSNN-LD (channel 39); Nexstar's Tegna subsidiary owns CBS affiliate WTSP (channel 10). WTTA and WFLA-TV share studios on South Parker Street in downtown Tampa and are broadcast from a transmitter in Riverview, Florida.

Channel 38, which had been dormant since the demise of WSUN-TV in 1970, received renewed interest later in the decade, primarily from groups seeking to build a subscription television station for the area. The only applicant that never contemplated such operation—Bay Television, an affiliate of Sinclair Broadcast Group—won the construction permit and put it on the air on June 21, 1991. It was a low-rated independent station that raised its profile by airing Fox Kids programming and Tampa Bay Lightning hockey games. This changed in 1999, when Sinclair paid The WB its first-ever reverse compensation fee to induce an affiliation switch and WB programming moved from channel 32. The station also aired, from 2003 to 2006, a local newscast using Sinclair's News Central format. When The WB and UPN merged to form The CW in 2006, WTOG (channel 44) was selected as its affiliate, and WTTA affiliated with MyNetworkTV.

WTTA came under common ownership with WFLA-TV in 2014, as the result of a multi-market station swap induced when then–WFLA-TV owner Media General merged with LIN Media. WFLA added local prime time and morning newscasts to channel 38, as well as Spanish-language news and lifestyle programming. The CW affiliation moved to WTTA in 2023.

== Prior history of channel 38 in St. Petersburg ==
Channel 38 was the first channel to be used by a television station in the Tampa Bay area. The city of St. Petersburg, then the owner of radio station WSUN (620 AM), put WSUN-TV on the air on May 31, 1953. It was the fourth ultra high frequency (UHF) station in the state and had been applied for because Tampa Bay's two existing very high frequency (VHF) channels were already being applied for by multiple groups. Channel 8 began as WFLA-TV in February 1955, followed by channel 13 as WTVT that April; their arrival caused the station to lose national advertisers after two years of substantial profits. In 1957, the Federal Communications Commission (FCC) allocated a third VHF channel, channel 10, to the Tampa Bay area. The city of St. Petersburg applied but lost to an application backed by the Rahall brothers.

WLCY-TV, now WTSP, began broadcasting on July 18, 1965, and assumed WSUN-TV's ABC affiliation on September 1. The city sold the WSUN stations to WCAR, Inc., of Detroit later that year. Channel 38 continued to broadcast as a money-losing independent station until closing on February 23, 1970. Its permit remained active until it was canceled in May 1974.

== Sinclair ownership ==
=== Construction and early years ===
In 1977, three years after WSUN-TV was deleted, the Commercial Radio Institute of Baltimore applied for channel 38. The application came at a time when interest in new UHF TV stations was on the rise. The Commercial Radio Institute's interest was followed by a group backed by Clint Murchison Jr., which sought to use channel 38 as a conduit for subscription television (STV) programming; In all, four applicants filed for the channel at the FCC. Bay Television (a subsidiary of the Commercial Radio Institute) was the only applicant not seeking subscription television authorization. It competed with Murchison's Suncoast 38 Inc.; the locally based Home TV, Inc., whose investors included former Tampa mayor Dick A. Greco and former St. Petersburg mayor Herman Goldner; and Oak Television of Tampa Bay, associated with the subscription service ON TV. The Murchison firm was out of the race by the time the FCC designated the proceeding for comparative hearing in late 1981, and Oak abandoned the field after an agreement with Home TV that gave it the right to purchase the company's STV operation.

In February 1983, an FCC administrative law judge issued an initial decision favoring Home TV for the channel, on account of its proposed integration of ownership and management (that owners would actively be managing the station) and fewer interests in other broadcast stations. By this time, Home TV was proposing a full-time commercial independent station in light of the economic situation facing STV stations elsewhere. Bay Television appealed the ruling to the FCC's review board. Home's original application had named former WLCY-TV general manager Todd Spoeri as the proposed manager of channel 38, but when he took another job, it took 18 months for the firm to notify the commission. That delay, the review board found, was part of a "clear pattern" and enough of a demerit to put Home TV behind Bay Television in comparative standing.

The broadcasting division of the Commercial Radio Institute took the name Sinclair Broadcast Group in 1986. In 1987, Sinclair stated it was ready to find a tower site, and by 1990 the equipment was being installed. There was little indication of what programming the new station would carry, even though the market already had two functioning independents and a home shopping station. The Telemundo Spanish-language network made two offers to buy the construction permit, both of which were rebuffed by Sinclair. WTTA affiliated with the Star Television Network, a network broadcasting infomercials and classic TV series, and hoped to begin broadcasting in late November 1990. but several of the network's affiliates (including WTTA) were not ready to go on the air, contributing to financial problems that forced Star to shut down in January 1991.

WTTA began broadcasting on June 21, 1991, as the Tampa Bay area's fourth independent station (behind WTOG channel 44, WFTS-TV channel 28, and WTMV channel 32). It had limited programming, mostly old reruns and movies. The new station acquired the rights to The Zoo Tube, the televised version of WRBQ radio's morning show, that September; the program, produced by local cable company Jones Intercable, had previously aired on WTMV. After broadcasting only 11 hours a day during the summer, the station shifted to 24-hour broadcasting that same month. Channel 38 also aired Tampa Bay Rowdies soccer and two series once aired on public access: a dance show for kids and teens called The Club and The Ric Rollins Show, a local talk program. Race highlights from Tampa Bay Downs horse racing and the Derby Lane greyhound racing track debuted in 1994.

In March 1994, WTTA fired a master control operator after seconds of pornography ran during an episode of Gunsmoke. The station received publicity in the local media and was the subject of a joke by Jay Leno on The Tonight Show.

=== Raising 38's profile ===
In 1994, a major television affiliation switch affected the Tampa Bay market. Fox programming moved from WFTS to WTVT, but the new affiliate did not want to air the Fox Kids daytime cartoon lineup. As a result, Fox Kids programming moved to WTTA on December 12, giving the station a new element to its broadcast day of old reruns and talk shows, new national advertisers, and a built-in audience. The Fox Kids Club that WFTS had started had 80,000 members. Even though Fox children's programs saw their audience decline by half, the move was a boon for the small station.

WTTA supplanted WTOG as the broadcast home of Tampa Bay Lightning hockey beginning in 1996. Sunshine Network, which produced and distributed the telecasts, was unable to place playoff games on WTOG because it had committed to UPN programming. As a result, beginning with two late-season road games, Lightning games aired on WTTA. Lightning playoff telecasts that year attracted some of the highest ratings in station history to date. WTTA replaced WTOG as the regular-season flagship station beginning with the 1996–97 season and aired 18, 10, 11, and 9 games respectively over the next four seasons before the team moved all telecasts to cable in 2000.

=== WB affiliation and News Central ===
When The WB launched in January 1995, it affiliated with WTMV; that station was sold to the Hearst Corporation and relaunched as WWWB in September 1996. However, in the year following the relaunch of WWWB, Sinclair became very close to the network. In 1997, it reached an affiliation agreement to flip multiple UPN stations to The WB. In May 1998, the network gave WWWB a year to transfer the network affiliation in the Tampa Bay market to WTTA; Sinclair had paid a multi-million-dollar premium to The WB to induce the change. It was the first time that the network had accepted a reverse compensation payment.

Ahead of the switch, Sinclair began programming WTTA directly under a 10-year time brokerage agreement with Bay Television and acquired rights to top syndicated programs such as Home Improvement, The People's Court, and Seinfeld. It moved the station out of its cramped quarters and into a 15,000-square-foot (1,400 m^{2}) facility in Town 'n' Country. Sinclair also considered starting a local newscast on the station. The switch occurred on September 1, 1999; WB programs moved to channel 38, and channel 32 became WMOR-TV.

In 2002, Sinclair began planning a local newscast for WTTA under the company's News Central format. The WB 38 News at Ten debuted on August 25, 2003, with former WTSP anchor David Klugh as weeknight anchor. Under the News Central format, local stories and sports were presented from Tampa, focusing on issues-based reporting, while national news and weather originated from News Central and were presented by Morris Jones from Sinclair headquarters in Hunt Valley, Maryland. Ratings were low; in 2005, Sinclair dropped the sports department and fired the weeknight and weekend anchors. With declining ratings for WB programming further impacting the ratings performance of the newscast, the WB 38 News at Ten was canceled on March 31, 2006, affecting some 18 to 20 news employees.

=== MyNetworkTV affiliation ===
In 2006, UPN and The WB merged to form The CW. WTOG, one of UPN's owned-and-operated stations, was among the first stations confirmed for the new network. WTTA and 16 other Sinclair stations signed up to affiliate with MyNetworkTV, a new service formed by the News Corporation, which also owned the Fox network. The station rebranded as MyTV Tampa Bay.

From 2007 to 2009, WTTA aired a 35-minute 10 p.m. local newscast produced by WFLA-TV, News Channel 8 at 10. The program fulfilled a longstanding goal of WFLA to compete with a 10 p.m. newscast even though its network, NBC, aired entertainment programming in that time slot. The newscast was discontinued on April 30, 2009, as part of a round of cost cuts at WFLA-TV and the co-owned The Tampa Tribune newspaper. Sinclair acquired WTTA outright from Bay Television in 2012 in a $40 million transaction.

== Common ownership with WFLA-TV ==
In 2014, WFLA-TV owner Media General merged with LIN Media. The deal required divestitures of some broadcast stations to meet FCC ownership limits of the time. In a deal announced on August 20 and closed on December 19, Sinclair acquired stations in Providence, Rhode Island; Green Bay, Wisconsin; and Savannah, Georgia, in exchange for trading WTTA and Media General's stations in Colorado Springs, Colorado. The exchange was touted as allowing Media General to grow in the company's second-largest market and giving Sinclair ownership cap room to acquire more stations in smaller markets. Media General in turn merged with Nexstar Broadcasting Group to form Nexstar Media Group in a deal announced in 2016 and completed in January 2017.

After the acquisition, a suite of new WFLA-produced news and lifestyle programs rolled out on channel 38. An hour-long, nightly 8 p.m. newscast was introduced on January 4, 2016. A two-hour morning news extension, from 7 to 9 a.m., debuted in 2017. WTTA also began airing local Spanish-language programming as an extension of WFLA's Tampa Hoy website. In 2021, Noticias Tampa Hoy began airing at 9 p.m., and channel 38 began broadcasting Tampa Bay Buccaneers preseason games in Spanish using the team's existing Spanish-language radio announcing team. The next year, a lifestyle show, Todo Tampa Bay (Everything Tampa Bay), debuted, airing after the newscast.

WTTA also began providing programming relief for WFLA-TV. In 2016, two Buccaneers preseason games were moved to channel 38 because of conflicts with the 2016 Summer Olympics, and the next year a regular-season NBC NFL telecast was moved to channel 38 to permit WFLA to cover Hurricane Irma.

In May 2023, CBS News and Stations announced that its CW affiliates, including WTOG, would cease their affiliation with the network in September 2023 and become independent stations. The affiliation change was provided for in the 2022 acquisition of The CW by Nexstar. In three of the eight markets, including Tampa Bay, Nexstar acquired the affiliation, with WTTA beginning to air CW programming on September 1. With the addition of CW programming, the Spanish-language newscast moved to 10:30 p.m.

== Technical information ==
WFLA-TV and WTTA transmit using WFLA-TV's spectrum from a transmitter site in Riverview, Florida. The stations' signals are multiplexed:

Subchannels of WFLA-TV and WTTA
License	Subchannel	Res.	Short name	Programming
WFLA-TV	8.1	1080i	WFLA HD	NBC
WFLA-TV	8.2	480i	Charge!	Charge!
WFLA-TV	8.3	480i	Antenna	Antenna TV
WTTA	38.1	720p	WTTA	The CW
WTTA	38.2	480i	COZI	Cozi TV

WTTA began broadcasting a digital signal on January 1, 2003, on channel 57. It shut down its analog signal on February 17, 2009, the original target digital television transition date, and moved its digital signal to channel 38. However, Bay successfully petitioned the FCC later that year to move to channel 32, citing adjacent-channel interference.

In 2017, WTTA sold its broadcast spectrum for $19,927,820 in the broadcast incentive auction, and it began broadcasting from the same channel as WFLA-TV on June 25, 2018. WFLA-TV was in turn repacked from channel 9 to channel 7, work that was completed on June 7, 2020.
