= WMOR-TV =

Television station in Lakeland, Florida

ATSC 3.0 station
- Lakeland–Tampa–; St. Petersburg, Florida; United States
- City: Lakeland, Florida
- Channels: Digital: 18 (UHF); Virtual: 32
- Branding: MOR

Programming
- Affiliations: 32.1: Independent; 32.2: MeTV; 32.3: Estrella TV

Ownership
- Owner: Hearst Television; (Hearst Properties Inc.)

History
- First air date: April 15, 1986
- Former call signs: WTMV (1986–1996); WWWB (1996–1999)
- Former channel numbers: Analog: 32 (UHF, 1986–2009); Digital: 19 (UHF, 2003–2020)
- Former affiliations: Independent (1986–1995); The WB (1995–1999); Fox Kids (2001–2002); FoxBox/4Kids TV (2002–2008)
- Call sign meaning: "More TV" (former branding)

Technical information
- Licensing authority: FCC
- Facility ID: 53819
- ERP: 1,000 kW
- HAAT: 459 m (1,506 ft)
- Transmitter coordinates: 27°49′10.8″N 82°15′38″W

Links
- Public license information: Public file; LMS
- Website: www.mor-tv.com

WMOR-TV (channel 32) is an independent television station licensed to Lakeland, Florida, United States, serving the Tampa Bay area. Owned by Hearst Television, the station maintains studios on Hillsborough Avenue in east Tampa, and its transmitter is located in Riverview.

Channel 32 began broadcasting on April 15, 1986, as WTMV, owned by Lakeland Public Interest Telecasters. Branded as "V-32", its original format consisted primarily of music videos, along with a local talk show. In the late 1980s, in response to low ratings and revenue, WTMV dropped the music videos and became a general-entertainment independent station with classic TV series and sports telecasts, as well as programs not aired locally by network affiliates. It became an affiliate of The WB in 1995.

In 1996, Hearst acquired WTMV. It overhauled the programming and facilities of channel 32, which relaunched as WWWB on September 15, 1996. Under Hearst, channel 32 became the primary over-the-air telecaster of Tampa Bay Devil Rays baseball. In 1999, the station lost The WB to WTTA (channel 38) and became WMOR-TV, originally branded as "More-TV". WMOR-TV is Tampa Bay's ATSC 3.0 (NextGen TV) station.

== History ==
=== WTMV: Startup and music video format ===
In November 1979, Lakeland Telecasters filed an application seeking the unused channel 32 allocation at Lakeland. By May 1980, a total of seven applicants had filed seeking the channel. Most were owned by out-of-state interests, among them Kenneth R. Giddens, owner of WKRG-TV in Mobile, Alabama. By February 1983, the field had winnowed to four, and these firms agreed to a settlement, hours before comparative hearings were to begin. The winning firm was Lakeland Public Interest Telecasters, a merger of Lakeland Telecasters and the Public Interest Corporation of St. Petersburg Beach.

Channel 32's programming plans were announced in June 1985. Instead of being a general-entertainment independent station, WTMV would broadcast mostly music videos. However, channel 32's start-up was postponed due to construction delays as well as holdups in securing a tower site. WTMV began broadcasting on April 15, 1986. Broadcasting from a transmitter site at Mulberry, southeast of Tampa and southwest of Lakeland, the station had a fringe signal in western portions of Tampa Bay, such as St. Petersburg. It was known on-air as V-32.

WTMV featured hosted music video segments—George Lowe was one of its first video jockeys (VJs)—as well as a talk show featuring Richard Shanks, formerly of WPLP (570 AM). On one edition of The Richard Shanks Show, the host mooned his viewers in support of a high school student who was punished for doing the same thing. Though the Shanks program was canceled months later, the mooning incident was later cited by The Ledger as having sowed anti-WTMV sentiment in the community.

The music video format never had the audience acceptance or revenue it needed to survive. Owner Dan Johnson noted in a 1988 interview that ratings services required viewers to have a telephone to be measured, hindering their ability to report viewership for people under the age of 30. On September 21, 1987, some of the music video programming was dropped; Lowe, Buehl, and Shanks were dismissed; and WTMV added classic TV series, cartoons, talk shows, and syndicated college sports telecasts to its lineup. The new format won WTMV increased interest from local cable systems, some of which did not previously offer channel 32 in their lineups. By 1988, WTMV was airing music videos nine hours a day and was the last over-the-air music video station in the country. That year, the station moved most of its operations from Lakeland, where the lease on its original studio ended, to a facility in east Hillsborough County that had once housed offices for Group W Cable. To improve its picture in Pinellas County, WTMV began being rebroadcast on a low-power TV station on channel 63 in St. Petersburg in 1991. After carrying baseball games from several team networks including the St. Louis Cardinals, Cincinnati Reds, and Toronto Blue Jays, the station became the Tampa Bay–area home of Florida Marlins baseball when the team debuted in 1993.

In the early 1990s, WTMV added programming discarded by Tampa Bay network affiliates. In addition to airing rebroadcasts of local newscasts from WTVT (channel 13), it began airing CBS's Saturday cartoons when WTVT dropped them for a newscast. From NBC affiliate WFLA-TV (channel 8), it picked up a game of the 1991 NBA Finals that WFLA preempted for a telethon and NBC's package of Notre Dame Fighting Irish football games, which WFLA-TV discarded to air syndicated Southeastern Conference football. WTMV became Tampa Bay's affiliate of The WB when it launched on January 11, 1995.

=== Hearst ownership ===
On October 31, 1995, the Hearst Corporation announced it had agreed to purchase WTMV from Lakeland Public Interest Telecasters. The transaction marked Hearst's entry into Florida and was the company's first station acquisition since its purchase of Boston's WCVB-TV in 1986. The $28 million valuation shocked observers, one of whom valued it around $5 million and thought the most it would sell for was $9 million amid a hot market for TV stations. Upon taking control in June 1996, Hearst launched a comprehensive upgrade campaign which included upgraded studio equipment, an improved signal, and a new image. Hearst won the bidding for the over-the-air simulcast of the Tampa Bay Buccaneers football team's September 15 game on the NFL on TNT. Days before the game, the station increased its effective radiated power to 5 million watts from a taller tower at the Mulberry site, and on September 15, the station relaunched as WWWB. Days later, WWWB and WTSP (channel 10) won a joint five-year contract to televise 51 and 14 games a season, respectively, of the expansion Tampa Bay Devil Rays baseball team beginning in 1998. By January 1998, WWWB was in discussions with the local cable news service Bay News 9 about producing a local newscast.

Less than two years after the overhaul, Hearst learned that it would lose The WB by 1999 at the latest to WTTA (channel 38). The move occurred after WTTA's owner, Sinclair Broadcast Group, paid a multi-million-dollar premium to The WB to move its affiliation in the market, a year after Sinclair had switched several of its UPN affiliates to The WB. It was the first time that network had accepted a reverse compensation payment. The switch occurred on September 1, 1999, and saw channel 32 rebrand to WMOR-TV, known as "More-TV 32", with Salty the Parrot from the Hearst-owned comic strip Popeye replacing The WB's Michigan J. Frog as the station mascot. Channel 32's new post-WB evening lineup was oriented at younger, Black viewers. By 2001, both WMOR and WTTA were struggling, tied in the ratings with a 2% all-day audience share. The Devil Rays moved their over-the-air telecasts to WXPX-TV (channel 66) in 2003. In 2004, WMOR aired the full Tampa Bay Buccaneers preseason schedule on behalf of rightsholder WFLA-TV due to conflicts with the Summer Olympics and Democratic National Convention.

The More TV brand was dropped in 2008, when the station became known as TV 32. With many viewers seeing WMOR on cable systems where it was not channel 32, the station rebranded as MOR in 2011.

== Technical information ==
Since December 1, 2020, WMOR-TV is Tampa Bay's ATSC 3.0 (NextGen TV) transmitting station. Its subchannels are broadcast in ATSC 1.0 format on the signals of three other Tampa Bay stations:

=== Subchannels ===
Subchannels provided by WMOR-TV (ATSC 1.0)
Subchannel	Res.	Short name	Programming	ATSC 1.0 host
32.1	1080i	WMOR-TV	Main WMOR-TV programming	WFTS-TV
32.2	480i	MeTV	MeTV	WTSP
32.3	480i	Estrell	Estrella TV	WTVT

WMOR-TV broadcasts from its transmitter in Riverview in 3.0 format:

Subchannels of WMOR-TV (ATSC 3.0)
Subchannel	Res.	Short name	Programming
8.1	1080p	WFLA	NBC (WFLA-TV)
10.1	1080p	WTSP	CBS (WTSP)
13.1	720p	WTVT	Fox (WTVT)
28.1	720p	WFTS	ABC (WFTS-TV)
32.1	1080p	WMOR	Main WMOR-TV programming

Subchannel broadcast with digital rights management

=== Analog-to-digital conversion ===
WMOR-TV ended regular programming from its Mulberry analog transmitter on June 12, 2009, as part of the digital television transition. The station's digital signal, broadcast from Riverview, remained on its pre-transition UHF channel 19 before being repacked to channel 18 in 2020.
