= Chip Carter =

Chip Carter is the name of:

- James Earl "Chip" Carter III, son of former U.S. President Jimmy Carter
- Chip Carter, former sports director of WTVT-TV
