= Crippen =

Crippen most often refers to:

- Dr. Crippen or Hawley Harvey Crippen (1862–1910), American homeopath hanged in England for murdering his wife

Crippen may also refer to:

== People ==
- Dan Crippen (born 1952), American bureaucrat
- Dick Crippen, American sports commentator
- Fran Crippen (1984–2010), American open-water swimmer
- Greg Crippen (born 2002), American football player
- Robert Crippen (born 1937), American astronaut

== Other ==
- Doctor Crippen (1942 film), a German film about the murderer
- Dr. Crippen (1962 film), a British film about the murderer
- Crippen, a 2004 novel by John Boyne
