= WTOG =

Television station in St. Petersburg, Florida

- St. Petersburg–Tampa, Florida; United States
- City: St. Petersburg, Florida
- Channels: Digital: 19 (UHF); Virtual: 44
- Branding: Tampa Bay 44

Programming
- Affiliations: 44.1: Independent; for others, see § Subchannels

Ownership
- Owner: CBS Television Stations; (CBS Operations Investments Inc.)

History
- Founded: December 15, 1966
- First air date: November 4, 1968
- Former channel numbers: Analog: 44 (UHF, 1968–2009); Digital: 59 (UHF, 1995–2009), 44 (UHF, 2009–2020)
- Former affiliations: Independent (1968–1986, 1988–1995); Fox (1986–1988); UPN (1995–2006); The CW (2006–2023)
- Call sign meaning: Nod to former sister station WGTO radio in Orlando

Technical information
- Licensing authority: FCC
- Facility ID: 74112
- ERP: 700 kW
- HAAT: 452.9 m (1,486 ft)
- Transmitter coordinates: 27°50′51.5″N 82°15′49.4″W
- Translator(s): see § Translators

Links
- Public license information: Public file; LMS
- Website: www.tampabay44.com

WTOG (channel 44), branded as Tampa Bay 44, is an independent television station licensed to St. Petersburg, Florida, United States, serving the Tampa Bay area. It is owned by the CBS Television Stations group, and maintains studios on Northeast 105th Terrace in St. Petersburg, near the west end of the Gandy Bridge; its transmitter is located in Riverview, Florida.

== History ==
=== Early years ===
WTOG first signed on the air on November 4, 1968, operating as an independent station. The station was founded by Saint Paul, Minnesota–based Hubbard Broadcasting, who also owned radio station WGTO (540 AM) in nearby Cypress Gardens. Hubbard originally wanted to name the station WGTO-TV, but the request was denied by the Federal Communications Commission (FCC); in those days, the FCC did not allow television and radio stations to share the same base call sign if they were licensed in different cities. This led to Hubbard using a slightly modified form of the call sign.

The station began with a limited test schedule airing two hours per day, but expanded to broadcasting eight hours per day on January 27, 1969, initially airing from 3 p.m. to 11 p.m. daily.

Initially, WTOG ran a lineup of older movies, some low-budget syndicated programs, a few off-network westerns and sitcoms, and some cartoons. In the station's early days, its slogan was "WTOG... As Far as the Eye Can See", which was made famous by its mid-1970s station identification package. WTOG caught on with viewers immediately; so much so, in fact, that it forced competitor WSUN-TV (channel 38) off the air in 1970. For the rest of the 1970s into the early 1980s, WTOG was the only independent station in the Tampa Bay area. During the 1970s, WTOG gradually expanded its programming hours: by 1972, the station signed on at 10:30 a.m. on weekdays and around 1 p.m. on weekends. By 1976, WTOG signed on the air daily by 7 a.m. Gradually, WTOG added better sitcoms, more cartoons, off-network dramas, and better movies. While the station was profitable all along, its programming improved significantly in the late 1970s.

=== Becoming a superstation ===
Channel 44 finally gained competition in 1981, when Family Group Broadcasting signed on WFTS-TV (channel 28) as a family-oriented independent station. However, WTOG remained the clear leader in the market for the next two decades. During the 1970s and 1980s, the station was carried on many cable providers in central and southwestern Florida. In the 1980s, WTOG also maintained a network of low-power repeaters, located in Sebring, Inverness, Arcadia (in the Fort Myers market; that translator has since shut down), Ocala (part of the Orlando market; that translator, W29AB, has since become a translator for Orlando's WKMG-TV) and Okeechobee (part of the West Palm Beach market). It billed itself as "Florida's Super Station", which "Covered Florida Like the Sun".

There was also some consideration to put WTOG on cable in Tallahassee, but that never came to fruition. WTOG was one of the most profitable independent stations in the country. During the late 1970s, Ted Turner called the station to ask how WTOG made itself so profitable.

=== From Fox to UPN ===
On October 9, 1986, WTOG became a charter affiliate of the fledgling Fox network. Like most early Fox affiliates, channel 44 was still effectively programmed as an independent, as Fox aired only two hours of prime time programming on Saturday and Sunday evenings early on (it would not expand to seven days a week until 1993). However, over time, channel 44 became one of several Fox affiliates nationwide that were disappointed with the network's weak programming offerings, particularly on Saturday nights, which were bogging down WTOG's otherwise successful lineup. WTOG dropped its Fox affiliation on August 8, 1988, sending it to WFTS (which was acquired by the E. W. Scripps Company in 1986). Through the early 1990s, WTOG was still running mostly cartoons (both classic and recent), classic and recent sitcoms, drama series and older films. As part of a deal with United Television, WTOG was an affiliate of the Prime Time Entertainment Network syndication programming service from 1993 to 1995.

WTOG was largely unaffected by the affiliation swaps of 1994, which saw longtime CBS affiliate WTVT (channel 13) switch to Fox (as a result of the network's affiliation deal with then-owners New World Communications); WFTS becoming an ABC affiliate; and longtime ABC outlet WTSP (channel 10) assuming the market's CBS affiliation. However, channel 44 did regain a network relationship when it became a charter affiliate of the United Paramount Network (UPN) at its launch on January 16, 1995. As with its days as a Fox affiliate, WTOG continued to program itself as an independent, programming a traditional general entertainment format during the day, with UPN programming being shown during the prime time hours.

Paramount Stations Group, a subsidiary of Viacom (which jointly owned the All News Channel cable network with Hubbard) acquired the station in the spring of 1996; at the time, Paramount Stations Group was in the process of selling its non-UPN stations, and traded NBC affiliates WNYT in Albany, New York, and WHEC-TV in Rochester, New York, to Hubbard. The purchase by Viacom made WTOG a UPN owned-and-operated station, becoming the first network-owned station in the Tampa Bay market. Soon after taking control, Paramount changed WTOG's on-air branding to "UPN44". By the late 1990s, older sitcoms and older cartoons made way for talk shows, court shows and reality programs during the daytime. Recent cartoons and recent sitcoms continued to air but movies also were eliminated almost completely. Viacom purchased CBS in 2000 and merged that network's owned-and-operated stations into Paramount Stations Group.

For one day in May 1999, WTOG housed the operations for WFLA-TV (channel 8), after a power outage occurred at that station's main studios in Downtown Tampa.

=== Switch to The CW ===
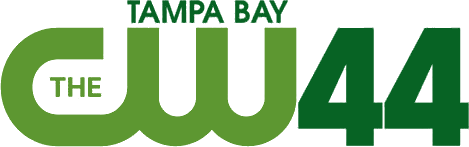
Former logo as CW 44

On January 24, 2006, CBS Corporation (which split from Viacom, one month earlier) and the Warner Bros. Entertainment unit of Time Warner announced that the two companies would shut down The WB and UPN and combine the networks' respective programming to create a new "fifth" network called The CW. The CW signed a 10-year affiliation agreement with 11 of CBS' UPN stations, including WTOG; channel 44 became a CW owned-and-operated station when the network launched on September 18, 2006. WTOG was one of two network-owned stations in the Tampa Bay market, alongside Fox-owned WTVT. Gradually, cartoons would disappear from WTOG's schedule, as with every broadcast station in the early 2000s. More reality and court shows would begin airing in place of that programming, while sitcoms continue to run during the evening hours.

For years, WTOG had handled master control operations for its sister station, KEYE-TV in Austin, Texas. However, in November 2006, WTOG's master control facilities, along with that of Atlanta's WUPA, were moved to sister CW affiliate WGNT in Norfolk, Virginia; 20 WTOG employees were laid off, even though CBS had previously denied that such terminations would happen. KEYE was later sold to Cerberus Capital Management, through its Four Points Media Group. WGNT was sold to Local TV, the owner of that market's CBS affiliate WTKR, in August 2010; when CBS wound down operations at the Norfolk hub, WTOG and WUPA began handling their own master control operations once again.

=== Return to independence ===
On October 3, 2022, Nexstar Media Group acquired majority ownership of The CW. Under the agreement, CBS was given the right to pull its affiliations from WTOG and its seven other CW stations. On May 5, 2023, CBS announced that it would exercise that right and WTOG would cease airing the network's programming at the end of August and become an independent station for the first time since 1995. Nexstar-owned WTTA (channel 38) assumed The CW affiliation for the Tampa market on September 1.

== Programming ==
=== Sports programming ===
From its sign-on through 1976, WTOG carried Atlanta Braves baseball games through a syndication package that aired regionally on stations across the Southern United States before the cable/satellite launch of Superstation TBS the same year effectively ended the Braves regional network. From 1977 until 1989, it aired a variety of Major League Baseball games from various team networks on a daily basis (with the exception of Saturdays, Mondays and Wednesdays). These included games from the Boston Red Sox, Chicago White Sox, Cincinnati Reds, Detroit Tigers, Houston Astros, Kansas City Royals, Minnesota Twins, New York Yankees, Philadelphia Phillies, Pittsburgh Pirates, St. Louis Cardinals and the Toronto Blue Jays, as those teams were mainly in the Grapefruit League for spring training in the Tampa Bay, Orlando, Fort Myers, and Sarasota areas. WTOG discontinued the baseball broadcasts when ESPN became the cable partner for Major League Baseball in 1990. In 2025, WTOG announced an agreement with the Tampa Bay Rays to simulcast 15 games alongside FanDuel Sports Network.

WTOG aired numerous Tampa Bay Rowdies professional NASL soccer road games in the late 1970s and early 1980s. Additionally, many home and away indoor matches were shown. Since 2024, WTOG has aired home matches of the current incarnation of the Rowdies, who play in the USL Championship.

The station also aired NHL games televised by NBC that were preempted by WFLA-TV in the 1970s. It later aired games from the NHL Network syndication package in the late 1970s and early 1980s. From 1992 until 1996, the station was the flagship of the Tampa Bay Lightning television network; the team then moved to WTTA.

=== News operation ===
From its sign-on through 1982, WTOG ran daily news capsules, mainly at sign-on and sign-off, with an announcer reading the day's headlines over a slide. In the late 1970s and early 1980s, the station featured an on-camera newsreader providing a news summary during its morning discussion program, Florida Daybreak. WTOG started using the Eyewitness News brand in the late 1970s, though its news was still a rather staid, low-key affair.

In 1982, Hubbard Broadcasting established a full-fledged news department for WTOG, and debuted a nightly 10 p.m. newscast. At first, WTOG continued to use the Eyewitness News name, with Barbara Callahan (former co-host of WTOG's edition of PM Magazine) and John Nicholson (formerly an anchor at WTVT) as co-anchors. During the mid-1980s, the station's newscast was renamed Tampa Bay Tonight, subsequently changing in 1988 to 44 News at Ten and then WTOG 44 News at Ten in 1992. Between 1985 and 1995, John Summer served as primary anchor with various co-anchors, including Callahan. In 1996, following Viacom's acquisition of WTOG, the 10 p.m. broadcast was retitled as the UPN44 10 O'Clock News, co-anchored by Callahan and Patrick Emory. WTOG also had an 11 a.m. newscast from 1995 to 1996.

WTOG's news department was shut down in 1998, as a result of cost-cutting measures mandated by then-parent company Viacom and competition from Fox station WTVT's own 10 p.m. newscast. From that point until 2020, WTOG did not air any newscasts, which made it one of seven CBS-owned stations that did not air any local news programming. WTOG had aired the syndicated morning show The Daily Buzz from 2004 until its sudden cancellation in 2015. It replaced its former time slot with paid programming and children's shows.

On January 17, 2020, CBS Television Stations announced that they would be introducing nightly 10 p.m. newscasts for WTOG, which debuted on March 9; the newscast for WTOG was produced by Miami sister station WFOR-TV. It also marked WTOG's return to airing local news programming since its own in-house news department shut down 22 years earlier. This newscast was converted to the CBS News Now format (as Tampa Bay Now News) upon its launch in July 2022. The last Tampa Bay Now newscast was August 31, 2023.

==== Notable former on-air staff ====
- Jane Akre – anchor (1996)
- Christine Chubbuck – reporter (early 1970s)
- Ray Perkins – host of The Buc Report
- Beasley Reece – sports (1986–1988, 1997–1998)
- Carmen Roberts – reporter (1980s)
- Mary Rogers – anchor (1992−1993)
- Rob Stone – sports (late 1990s)
- Ken Suarez – reporter (1988–1998)

== Technical information ==
=== Subchannels ===
The station's signal is multiplexed:

Subchannels of WTOG
Subchannel	Res.	Short name	Programming
44.1	1080p	WTOG	Main WTOG programming
44.2	480p	StartTV	Start TV
44.3	480p	Outlaw	Outlaw
44.4	480p	DABL	Dabl
44.5	480p	Catchy	Catchy Comedy
44.6	480p	MeTOONS	MeTV Toons
44.7	480p	Story	Story Television

=== Analog-to-digital conversion ===
WTOG shut down its analog signal, over UHF channel 44, on June 12, 2009, as part of the federally mandated transition from analog to digital television. The station's digital signal relocated from its pre-transition UHF channel 59, which was among the high band UHF channels (52–69) that were removed from broadcasting use as a result of the transition, to its analog-era frequency, UHF channel 44.

=== Translators ===
- W26DP-D Inverness
- W36FJ-D Sebring

==== Former translator ====
WTOG previously operated a third translator, W29AB (channel 29) licensed to Ocala. In 1995, it was sold to First Media and became a translator for WCPX (now WKMG-TV) in Orlando.
