= WSUN-TV =

Television station in St. Petersburg, Florida (1953–1970)

- 1953 logo, similar to a test pattern
- St. Petersburg–Tampa, Florida; United States
- City: St. Petersburg, Florida
- Channels: Analog: 38 (UHF)

Programming
- Affiliations: ABC (1953–1965); CBS (secondary, 1953–1955); NBC (secondary, 1953–1955); DuMont (secondary, 1953–1955); Independent (1965–1970)

Ownership
- Owner: City of St. Petersburg (1953–1966); WCAR, Inc. (1966–1970)

History
- First air date: May 31, 1953
- Last air date: February 23, 1970
- Call sign meaning: Shared with WSUN radio

Technical information
- ERP: 257,000 watts
- HAAT: 470 feet (140 m)
- Transmitter coordinates: 27°52′40″N 82°35′25″W

WSUN-TV was a television station broadcasting on ultra high frequency (UHF) channel 38 in St. Petersburg, Florida, United States, which operated from 1953 to 1970. It was founded by the city of St. Petersburg as the television adjunct to WSUN radio and, for nearly two years, was the only television station in the Tampa Bay area. Operating from studios in the St. Petersburg Pier, the station during this time aired programming from all major television networks and developed several local series, most notably the children's show host Captain Mac. In 1955, the original two commercial very high frequency (VHF) channels allocated to Tampa—WFLA-TV (channel 8) and WTVT (channel 13)—were activated, taking with them programming from NBC and CBS respectively and much of the local audience. WSUN-TV continued to provide the market with its ABC programming but struggled to stay competitive owing to its municipal ownership, a lack of capital investment, and the unequal status of UHF television in the 1950s and 1960s.

In 1957, the Federal Communications Commission allocated a third VHF channel to Tampa Bay: channel 10, which had to have a transmitter located to the north of the market. WSUN-TV filed for the new channel but lost to the Rahall brothers, who put WLCY-TV on the air in 1965. That station became the ABC affiliate within two months of signing on the air, consigning WSUN-TV to independent station status airing movies and old reruns. The city of St. Petersburg sold the WSUN stations to H. Y. Levinson of Detroit; they moved off the pier as a condition of the sale. The station's limited programming in its final years was considered poor, and startup independent WTOG (channel 44), which made its full launch in 1969, had better ratings and advertiser acceptance. On February 23, 1970, WSUN-TV left the air; its permit remained active for another four years. The channel was re-awarded in 1983 to Bay Television and returned to use as WTTA in June 1991.

== Establishment and early years ==
The Tampa Bay area had no television stations authorized when, in October 1948, the Federal Communications Commission (FCC) froze all new station grants. The only Florida stations authorized prior to the freeze were in Miami and Jacksonville. Meanwhile, there were applications on hand from WTSP, the radio station of the St. Petersburg Times, for St. Petersburg and from Gulf Theatres, The Tampa Tribune, and The Tampa Daily Times for Tampa. The Tampa newspapers owned stations WFLA and WDAE, respectively. When the freeze was lifted in 1952, the two cities were together allocated only three channels (VHF 8 and 13 and UHF 38), fewer than what many local leaders had expected due to the reservation of non-commercial educational channel 3 and restrictive spacing requirements on the Gulf Coast. Five groups were in the running, considering all the pre-freeze applicants. The fifth, which had not filed an application prior to the freeze, was the city of St. Petersburg, owner of station WSUN (620 AM). It proposed to operate on channel 38. The city of St. Petersburg was one of five municipalities across the country to own a radio station in 1948.

By the time application deadlines closed, each of channels 8, 13, and 38 had multiple applicants. Each VHF channel had three, while WSUN and Empire Coil Co. of New Rochelle, New York, were the only applicants for channel 38. A month before hearings were slated to begin, Empire Coil withdrew its application, evidently to focus on building KPTV in Portland, Oregon, leaving WSUN uncontested. WSUN had already prepared for the eventuality of television. The year prior, it had built a transmitting facility along the Gandy Bridge between St. Petersburg and Tampa, which featured towers capable of supporting a television antenna.

The Municipal Pier building in 1934, showing the trolley tracks and terminal. This space was later enclosed for use by WSUN-TV.

The permit was formally issued by the FCC on October 9, 1952. City manager Ross Windom estimated the costs of expanding WSUN to television at $350,000, and city council approved $345,508 in expenditures that November. The funds were split between transmitting equipment and a studio on St. Petersburg's municipal pier. The studio facility was installed in the space once occupied by a terminal for the city's disused trolley line, with the main studio measuring 35 by 46 feet (11 by 14 m).

On the night of May 15, 1953, WSUN-TV broadcast its first test pattern. Its first programming aired on May 31, beginning with a dedication in the studio and followed by various network programs for a broadcast day of more than seven hours. It was the second UHF station in Florida, behind WFTL-TV in Fort Lauderdale, the only other post-freeze outlet in the state, and the 32nd nationwide. WSUN-TV was affiliated with ABC, but it had contracts to use the programs of the other networks—CBS, NBC, and the DuMont Television Network. These programs were presented on kinescopes—filmed recordings—because the equipment to receive network programming had not yet been installed at Tampa, nor had the trans-bay microwave transmission link necessary for the programs to be transmitted from St. Petersburg. These missing links were completed in time for the 1953 World Series, which channel 38 carried live, and live network programs were incorporated into the station's schedule.

While channel 38 was getting going, the city council contemplated selling or leasing its broadcasting stations. In October 1953, the council voted to authorize a sale if it could get fair value and overcome various legal issues involving the city-owned studio site and state-owned transmitter site. It was the first time that the city council had authorized such an action though it had been considered at various points since 1935. Radio and television host Ted Mack was said to be among the interested bidders. These issues were solved, and the city took bids for a lease of at least 20 years, with the high bid coming from Edward Lamb's Lamb Enterprises. Mack finished second, and a bid from Ferris Rahall was disqualified. However, the city council unanimously rejected all the bids and then voted 5–2 to maintain ownership of the WSUN stations. The St. Petersburg Times in an editorial commented that the process had brought forth details about the city's involvement in broadcasting and capital investment that made any such deal unworkable. For instance, the station paid no rent for its studios, which could not be sold outright, nor did it pay income tax.

The first two years of operation were the peak of WSUN-TV's economic viability and power. In one year, the station grossed $750,000 and was hailed by Advertising Age as "the most successful UHF commercial operation in the history of the industry". Network programs were scheduled back-to-back to allow for the telecasting of as many popular programs as possible; local spots produced tremendous audience response. An advertisement for doughnuts, which merely featured station staff eating them on camera, prompted the bakery to sell out within 30 minutes and to do five times its normal business the next morning; a Sarasota corned beef firm was forced to stop advertising because it could not fill demand for its product.

WSUN-TV personalities quickly became local stars. Foremost among them was Burl McCarty, a radio announcer who hosted the station's children's show as Captain Mac, wearing a pith helmet and motorcycle boots. Some personalities carried from radio, such as Dayt Saltsman and Harry Smith. George Robinson, a WSUN radio newscasting fixture with his English accent and channel 38's first general manager, brought Major Robinson and the News to television. Charles Stump, who broadcast the weather daily over WSUN-TV, was the state's first television meteorologist. Reba Fox became the station's on-air cook after, in her job search, emphasizing her cooking skills. WSUN-TV was responsible for breaking country music artist Bobby Lord, who appeared on the channel 38 program Home Folks; he then entered the recording industry. Even fishermen on the pier, and their catches, occasionally featured in live spots.

== Competition arrives ==
The Municipal Pier in 1956

Tampa Bay's two VHF channels were soon occupied. In August 1954, the FCC authorized The Tampa Tribune to build channel 8. WFLA-TV began broadcasting on February 14, 1955, and took with it all NBC programs a week later. On April 1, WTVT opened on channel 13 and became the CBS affiliate. The arrival of these two stations spurred WSUN-TV to produce more local programming and air more ABC shows previously unseen locally. WSUN now competed with two VHF stations and was at a disadvantage in doing so. Most sets at the time required conversion to receive UHF stations, and the conditions that had shielded WSUN-TV from the fate of some other UHF stations had now disappeared. Also disappearing in 1955 was DuMont, which ceased its existence as a network.

The sign-on of WTVT briefly produced a period where Tampa had competing Captain Mac characters. McCarty left channel 38 to work for the new Tampa station and, after a lawsuit, won the right to use the name while WSUN-TV won the rights to use the name, show format, and host's uniform. Fred Davy, formerly of WENS in Pittsburgh, became the new Captain Mac for WSUN-TV. The WSUN-TV program with Davy was known as Captain Mac's Adventure Trails, while the WTVT version with McCarty was Captain Mac's Explorer's Club. This situation generated confusion and even a petition by St. Petersburg parents to force WSUN-TV to drop its version. The dueling captains persisted from May until McCarty returned to WSUN-TV in October.

Though only one ABC program placed in the top 15 in the Tampa Bay market in November 1956, UHF conversion was near-universal among television households in Pinellas and Hillsborough counties, and Captain Mac and The Mickey Mouse Club on channel 38 were the top two television shows aired more than once weekly in the ratings. McCarty retired in 1959 to become a public relations officer for the city of St. Petersburg, with a new children's show titled Funville, hosted by Nicky the Clown (Nicky Francis).

In retrospect, station staffers noted that this period was characterized by investment that failed to keep pace with the private commercial stations in Tampa. In a 1970 interview, Saltsman noted, "We couldn't compete on an equitable basis because we were considered another city department—like sanitation or water. We couldn't expect to hold viewers just because we were first on the air."

== Fight for channel 10 ==
The UHF-VHF inequity began to weigh on WSUN-TV, because national sponsors shunned advertising on UHF stations in favor of VHF stations like WFLA and WTVT. In February 1957, Windom—without city council approval—made an offer to a group that had formed to build Tampa's educational channel 3. He proposed to give the group $150,000 if it exchanged channels and moved to channel 38. Education leaders roundly rejected the proposal because they felt they would not be able to give area-wide coverage on channel 38.

In January 1955, three St. Petersburg men formed the Suncoast Cities Broadcasting Corporation and asked the FCC to allocate channel 10 to Pinellas County, in hopes of "prevent[ing] the major network television activity from being concentrated in Tampa". The channel had previously been requested by Jacksonville station WJHP-TV, which intended to locate it at Bunnell, Florida. When WJHP's owners, the Jacksonville Journal, acquired WESH in Daytona Beach, their application was disqualified. The commission allocated channel 10 to New Port Richey, sufficiently far enough from Miami where channel 10 could be allocated, on May 15, 1957. (Note: The FCC quickly dropped the New Port Richey license and assigned channel 10 more broadly to Tampa–St. Petersburg.)

The announcement stirred interest from seven different applicants, some of whom had lost in their attempts to obtain channels 8 or 13: Orange Broadcasting Company, headed by a Tampa department store executive; Walter Tison, the former owner of Tampa's WTVT, and a consortium from Clearwater; Suncoast Cities Broadcasting Corporation; Robert A. James, a Tampa businessman associated with the failed bid of Tampa Bay Area Telecasting Corporation; Nelson Poynter, president of the St. Petersburg Times; the Rahall group, which had bought WTSP from the St. Petersburg Times; and the city of St. Petersburg. Joining later in the proceeding was Tampa Broadcasters, Inc., owner of Tampa radio station WALT. St. Petersburg officials viewed obtaining channel 10 as necessary for WSUN-TV to continue; an attorney representing the city called the proceeding a "life or death matter" for the station. By the time the FCC set hearings on channel 10, there were six applicants in contention, including the city of St. Petersburg.

On February 1, 1961, FCC hearing examiner Millard French handed down an initial decision favoring WTSP-TV, Inc., the Rahall application, for the channel 10 grant. French favored WTSP-TV's proposed programming and program planning and found in favor of it on the factors of integration of ownership and management and the company's past broadcast record. In ruling out the other applicants, French found WSUN-TV's programming and broadcast experience poor, outweighing positives of the application. Multiple losing applicants contested French's initial decision. In September, the commission found in favor of the Rahall application. Citing changes since the Rahalls' radio station changed its format and became WLCY, the FCC's Broadcast Bureau objected to the decision, prompting it to be remanded for further hearings. In November 1964, the commission upheld the award to WTSP-TV, Inc.

We had hoped the commission would stop the networks from giving all their programs to VHF stations and leaving the pioneers in the television field out in the cold. It was a gamble and we lost.

— George Robinson, founding general manager, WSUN-TV

As early as 1961, Rahall had a commitment for the new channel 10 to affiliate with ABC. WLCY-TV began broadcasting on July 18, 1965. It operated as an independent station until September 1, when WSUN-TV's ABC affiliation agreement expired and the network moved from channel 38 to channel 10.

== As a private, independent station ==
In April 1965, the St. Petersburg city council began the process to take bids to privatize the WSUN stations. It had previously considered such a move in 1963, when one city councilman was accused of offering a bribe to the city's vice mayor to join him in a potential buyer. A call for bids attracted 20 prospective buyers and two major points of uncertainty: WSUN's fate after it lost ABC programming and whether the state Road Board would permit any lease of the state-owned transmitter site. H. Y. Levinson of Detroit, owner of that city's WCAR radio, placed the high bid on the stations at $1.13 million, beating out an offer from Boston-based Communications Enterprises, Inc. The city sold the WSUN stations to WCAR, Inc., of Detroit later that year, though the transaction was not filed with the FCC until January 1966. After the FCC approved the transaction in February, the owners evinced concern about channel 38's continued viability. The loss of network affiliation had substantially cut its revenue, and the new management was concerned about an "impending further deterioration" of its position.

The closing of the sale, effective April 26, started a seven-month period in which WSUN radio and television were to vacate the municipal pier. It also spurred a series of resignations and firings as new management cut positions and because of disagreements with the new ownership. By early 1967, the WSUN stations had still not yet moved to their new home, the former Amco Building on Second Avenue North. In 1968, the effective radiated power was boosted from 257,000 watts to 940,000 watts in what was contemplated as the first phase in an effort to boost reception.

In its independent era, WSUN-TV subsisted on old movies and network reruns in varying proportions. However, the market for independent telecasting was split with the November 1968 debut and January 1969 full launch of WTOG (channel 44) in St. Petersburg. Channel 44 relied on syndicated programming but also aired network shows not cleared by the local affiliates, and it quickly paced WSUN-TV in viewership and advertising. In April 1969, WSUN-TV's programming was curtailed to four hours daily and only featuring, per Martin Driscoll of the St. Petersburg Times, "the oldest and least expensive of its programs". On February 23, 1970, WSUN-TV signed off at the conclusion of its broadcast day and suspended service. A statement from Levinson noted that "the situation as to viewers and advertisers precludes continued operation at this time", while manager Stokes Gresham noted that thoughts of going silent had been discussed for three years and quoted monthly losses at $15,000 when it closed. WSUN-TV's final day of telecasting included wrestling as well as the 1950s series Tombstone Territory, Highway Patrol, and The Restless Gun. Robinson, in a 1970 interview, noted that "going off the air was a miserable relief from what [WSUN-TV] had become".

Gresham noted later that year that the station could return as a specialist outlet for Spanish-language programming or stock market information. There was some activity in 1971, as Levinson sought authority to build a new WSUN-TV transmitter site in Manatee County, first at Ellenton and then at Parrish.

When Levinson sold WSUN radio to Plough Broadcasting Company in 1972, he retained the channel 38 permit as well as all television equipment; Levinson noted there were "some plans" for its reactivation. WSUN-TV's permit was canceled in May 1974.

== Channel 38 after WSUN-TV ==
In 1977, three years after WSUN-TV was deleted, the Commercial Radio Institute of Baltimore applied for channel 38. The application came at a time when interest in new UHF TV stations was on the rise. By 1979, as many as four groups sought the channel, mostly for subscription television broadcasting. In 1983, an FCC review board overturned the examiner's initial decision and awarded channel 38 to Bay Television, a Commercial Radio Institute subsidiary. WTTA began broadcasting on June 21, 1991.
