= Mark Wilson (journalist and musician) =

American TV news anchor and guitarist

Mark Wilson (born 1969) is an American television news anchor with WTVT FOX 13 Tampa. and the lead guitarist in the band The Wilson Van, formerly known as Van Wilson, with his brothers Paul and actor/singer Patrick Wilson.

== Journalism/TV news ==
Mark has received several honors and awards for his reporting. He was honored by the Society of Professional Journalists in 2006 for his series of reports from the front line of battle in Iraq while embedded with a group of Tampa Bay Area Army Reservists and has multiple Emmy awards from the Suncoast Chapter of the National Academy of Television Arts and Sciences winning Emmys for his live and social media reporting from the Alabama tornadoes of 2011 and for a story on damaged iPhone screens in 2013.

A graduate of Florida State University, Mark worked at WNCN in Raleigh, NC in the mid 1990s and served as a regional correspondent for NBC. He joined WTVT in 1997 fulfilling a lifelong dream of working alongside his father, WTVT anchor John Wilson, who has been called a 'Walter Cronkite of Tampa Bay' following a career of more than 50 years television news anchoring in Norfolk, VA, Charlotte, NC, St. Louis, MO and Tampa/St. Pete, FL. Mark was chosen in 2005 by FOX to anchor and debut WTVT's first 11pm newscast (since becoming a FOX affiliate). and replaced anchor Kathy Fountain on WTVT's 5pm newscast in 2010. On November 5, 2014, his father John Wilson announced that Mark will take over WTVT's 6 & 10pm newscasts when John retired just before Thanksgiving 2014.

== Music/The Wilson Van ==
Mark is an avid rock guitarist with a diverse musical background. He grew up playing the violin and singing in his mother's church choirs only later to be heavily influenced by Eddie Van Halen. Mark has written and recorded several tracks for independent films and usually auctions off some of his custom guitars at Wilson Van benefit concerts and other community events.

Today, Mark and his brothers Paul Wilson and actor/singer Patrick Wilson and brother-in-law Charles Tillman get together several times a year and take the stage to perform in their rock band The Wilson Van raising money for their favorite Tampa Bay area charities. They play a mix of Van Halen, Journey, and Bon Jovi tunes with some other covers and mix in some original songs as well. The Wilson Van have since played charity shows for Academy Prep at 3 Daughters Brewing in St. Pete August 16, 2014, at Club Detroit in May 2013 raising money for the Gold Shield Foundation that provides scholarships for families of fallen first responders and at the State Theater in St. Pete in May 2012 raising money for Southeastern Guide Dogs' Paws for Patriots program that provides guide dogs to blind or injured veterans. With their busy schedules, the Wilson brothers rarely get time to practice for their events forcing them to collaborate with their iPhones via iMessage and via skype. Also in 2012, Mark accompanied his brother Patrick on stage at the Gershwin Theatre performing Sammy Hagar's "Eagles Fly" for the Broadway Blows Back benefit for victims of Hurricane Sandy.

== Personal life ==
Mark (born 1969) is married and lives in St. Petersburg with his wife Angela.
