= Mike Deeson =

American journalist

- Born: 8 December 1948 (age 77); Illinois
- Occupation: News reporter

Mike Deeson is an American investigative journalist who is known for his work at WTSP television in Tampa Bay, Florida, from 1982 to 2017.

== Early life ==
Deeson was born near Chicago, Illinois, and attended the Missouri School of Journalism.

== Career ==
After graduating college in the 1960s, Deeson worked at stations in Michigan, New York, and Virginia before landing in Tampa Bay.

While at WTSP, Deeson earned 11 Emmy Awards as well as The Society of Professional Journalists Florida Journalist of the Year award in 2015.

After his retirement, Deeson was honored by the Tampa, Florida City Council.

He then wrote a book about his time as a reporter, "Bad News for You Is Good News for Me!" The non-fiction book recalls stories from Deeson's coverage of U.S. presidents, wars abroad, and other stories from across Florida.

Deeson is also a published composer and the former regional coordinator for the Nashville Songwriters Association International.
