= Noah Pransky =

American journalist

Noah Pransky is a national political correspondent for NBC News in New York City. His previous title was National Political Editor for LX (TV network), a national news network aimed at younger audiences. He also contributes to NBC News and CNBC.

Before NBC, Pransky was the investigative reporter at WTSP in the Tampa Bay, Florida television market, for 10 years. He was best known for uncovering backroom deals on the Tampa Bay Rays stadium debacle and national political investigations that won him awards. That includes a "Zombie Campaigns" investigation into former members of Congress. He also made waves with a series of stories that showed how police were breaking the law during popular stings on predators. Some local politicians celebrated the news of his departure.

Pransky also worked at WGTA (TV) in Northeast Georgia, WZVN-TV and WBBH-TV in Fort Myers, Florida, and NESN in Boston.

== Awards and honors ==
2019 Alfred I. duPont–Columbia University Award

2019 National Walter Cronkite Award for Television Political Journalism

2018 Regional Edward R. Murrow Award (Radio Television Digital News Association)

2015 Alfred I. duPont–Columbia University Award

2014 George Polk Awards

2013 National Edward R. Murrow Award (Radio Television Digital News Association)

2013 Regional Edward R. Murrow Award (Radio Television Digital News Association)

2008 Regional Edward R. Murrow Award (Radio Television Digital News Association)

2007 Regional Edward R. Murrow Award (Radio Television Digital News Association)

17 Suncoast Emmy Awards from 2011 to 2018

== Personal life ==
Pransky went to Boston University and is a former mascot for the Boston Red Sox.
