= Rob Finnerty =

American television host

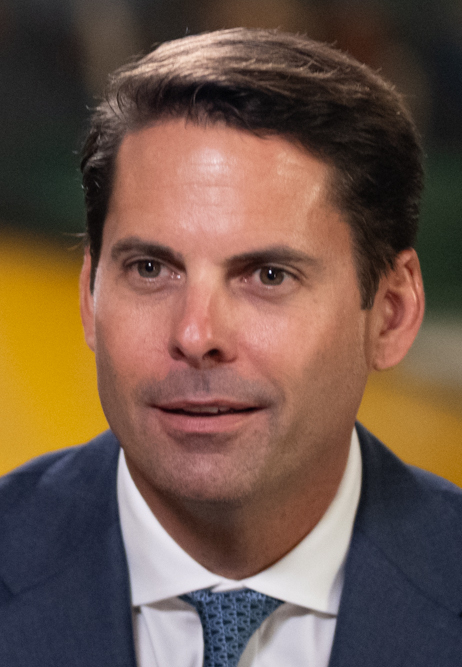
- Finnerty in an interview with President Donald Trump at the White House, August 2025
- Born: May 1, 1982 (age 44); Massachusetts, U.S.
- Education: Fairfield University
- Occupation: News host
- Years active: 2004–present
- Television: Newsmax; News Host (2021–present); WTSP 10 Tampa Bay; Morning Anchor (2017–2020); KCTV Kansas City (2016–2017); KBAK Bakersfield; NECN New England Cable News

Rob Finnerty (born May 1, 1982) is an American television news anchor and host. He hosted the morning news/talk program Wake Up America on Newsmax TV. On October 8, 2024, he started hosting a nightly Newsmax primetime show, Finnerty. Finnerty airs at 8 pm ET, a timeslot previously occupied by Eric Bolling before exiting Newsmax earlier in 2024.

== Background ==
Finnerty was born in Massachusetts and attended Fairfield University in Fairfield, Connecticut. He was a morning news anchor at WTSP in Tampa Bay. He also worked for a year at KCTV in Kansas City, Missouri and KBAK-TV in Bakersfield, California. He works at Newsmax TV.

== Controversies ==
In November 2008, Finnerty was charged with homicide and operating under the influence after hitting and killing a pedestrian in Boston. The homicide charges were eventually dropped. The Suffolk District Attorney dismissed the charge after a collision analysis report showed there was no way any driver–impaired or sober–could have avoided striking the pedestrian when he stepped into the street. Finnerty pleaded guilty to OUI in November 2009. On May 10, 2021, he made national headlines when he confronted former Obama speechwriter David Litt for trying to insert Newsmax criticisms during an interview about Elon Musk and Saturday Night Live.

On April 1, 2022, Finnerty interrupted his show with the false breaking news that "Russia has apparently surrendered" to Ukraine, then asking unaware guest Mark Halperin for his thoughts. When Halperin began to respond, Finnerty cut him off "to gleefully say that the whole thing was a prank" and mock Halperin for falling for it, upsetting fellow Newsmax employees behind the scenes, according to several news outlets.

On December 12, 2022, Finnerty stirred up controversy when he complained that the American Girl doll company had become "wokeified," because he couldn’t find a single doll which resembled his “cute little 6-year-old white girl" during a recent visit to the company's flagship store in Rockefeller Center in Midtown Manhattan, New York. However, multiple observers and journalists subsequently identified numerous white dolls prominently displayed in the same Rockefeller Center store, as well as dozens on the company's website.

On October 2026 Finnerty was forced to apologize to Kenyans after commenting badly about Nairobi. Kenyans on X made him do it live on TV.

== Personal life ==
Finnerty is married with two children, a son and a daughter.
