= WFTS-TV =

Television station in Tampa, Florida

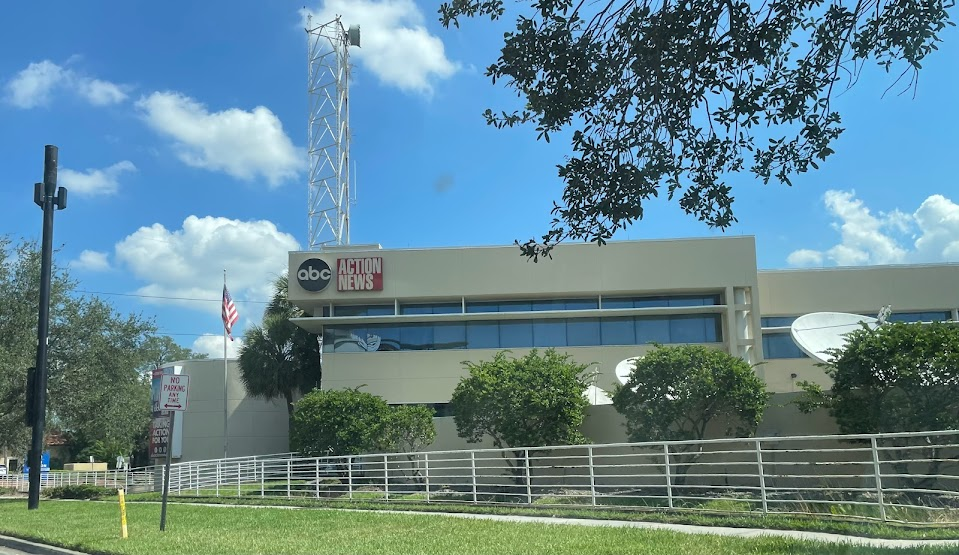
- The WFTS studios on Himes Avenue in Tampa were completed in 1996 and brought the news department and business offices under one roof.
- Tampa–St. Petersburg, Florida; United States
- City: Tampa, Florida
- Channels: Digital: 17 (UHF); Virtual: 28
- Branding: Tampa Bay 28

Programming
- Affiliations: 28.1: ABC; for others, see § Technical information and subchannels

Ownership
- Owner: E. W. Scripps Company; (Scripps Broadcasting Holdings LLC)
- Sister stations: WXPX-TV

History
- First air date: December 14, 1981
- Former channel numbers: Analog: 28 (UHF, 1981–2009); Digital: 29 (UHF, 1999–2020)
- Former affiliations: Independent (1981–1988); Fox (1988–1994)
- Call sign meaning: "Family Television Station"

Technical information
- Licensing authority: FCC
- Facility ID: 64588
- ERP: 1,000 kW
- HAAT: 469 m (1,539 ft)
- Transmitter coordinates: 27°50′33″N 82°15′44″W

Links
- Public license information: Public file; LMS
- Website: www.tampabay28.com

WFTS-TV (channel 28), branded as Tampa Bay 28, is a television station licensed to Tampa, Florida, United States, serving the Tampa Bay area as an affiliate of ABC. It is owned by the E. W. Scripps Company alongside independent station WXPX-TV (channel 66). The two stations share studios on North Himes Avenue on Tampa's northwest side; WFTS-TV's transmitter is located in Riverview, Florida.

Channel 28 was launched as the Tampa Bay area's second independent television station in December 1981 by a company that went on to become Family Group Broadcasting. It was purchased by Capital Cities Communications in 1984, though Capital Cities quickly sold it to Scripps the following year after it purchased the ABC television network. WFTS-TV became an affiliate of Fox in 1988.

A multi-market affiliation switch in 1994 saw WFTS-TV become Tampa Bay's ABC affiliate. The network attempted to disaffiliate from WWSB, its affiliate in Sarasota, but that station was ultimately allowed to remain with the network. To start local newscasts, channel 28 was forced to rent studio space in Clearwater. The newscasts debuted in fourth place in the market but have been more competitive since. In 1996, Scripps completed construction on the present studio facilities near Raymond James Stadium; the building accommodates the news department and is large enough that several business functions for the entire station group are run from Tampa.

== History ==
A channel 28 construction permit was first issued to Lucille Frostman, involved in the construction of WSMS-TV in Fort Lauderdale, in 1966, for a station to be called WTSS-TV; this was never built, and the permit was deleted in 1971.

Applications for a new channel 28 station in Tampa were received again in 1977, with the Christian Television Network the first to bid, followed by a group proposing a Spanish-language station; Family Television Corporation of Tampa, also of a Christian orientation; and Suncoast Telechoice, associated with subscription television equipment manufacturer Blonder Tongue Labs.

Christian Television dropped out, amended its application to specify channel 22 at Clearwater, and won a construction permit for WCLF in February 1979. The other two parties dropped out in settlement agreements in early 1981, and Family received a construction permit in March. Family stockholders included T. Terrell Sessums, former speaker of the Florida House of Representatives, and former state senate president Louis de la Parte.

=== As an independent station ===
WFTS first signed on the air on December 14, 1981, operating as a family-oriented independent station with cartoons, off-network dramas, classic movies and religious programs. Its call letters originally stood for "Family Television Station".

In 1984, after having launched the station for just $6 million and turning a profit in the first year, Family sold the station to Capital Cities Communications for more than $30 million. The deal gave Capital Cities its first station in Florida and its first (and only) independent, as well as bringing the group to its then-maximum of seven stations. Under Capital Cities, the station added more off-network sitcoms and reduced the number of religious programs and drama series on its schedule, improving ratings against established Tampa Bay independent WTOG.

In March 1985, Capital Cities stunned the broadcasting industry with its announced purchase of ABC—a network that was ten times bigger than Capital Cities was at the time. In addition to WFTS-TV, Capital Cities owned four ABC and two CBS affiliates (which would change to ABC after the merger). The combination of Cap Cities and ABC exceeded the new ownership limit of 12 stations and the 25% national reach limit, so the companies opted to sell WFTS; WXYZ-TV, the ABC-owned station in Detroit; and Cap Cities-owned ABC affiliates WKBW-TV in Buffalo and WTNH in New Haven, Connecticut; WFTS and WXYZ-TV were sold to Scripps-Howard Broadcasting.

Scripps continued the general-entertainment format on WFTS, running cartoons, sitcoms, movies and drama series. WFTS became the Tampa Bay market's Fox affiliate on August 8, 1988, after the network was dropped by WTOG.

=== As an ABC affiliate ===
Logo used from 2002 to 2025

On May 23, 1994, New World Communications signed an affiliation agreement with Fox that resulted in twelve of New World's stations, including Tampa Bay's longtime CBS affiliate WTVT (channel 13), being tapped to switch to the network. Among the stations making the switch were longtime CBS affiliates WJBK-TV in Detroit and WJW-TV in Cleveland. Not wanting to be relegated to the UHF band, CBS heavily wooed Detroit's longtime ABC affiliate, WXYZ, as well as Cleveland's longtime ABC affiliate, WEWS-TV. Both were owned by Scripps, who told ABC that it would switch WXYZ and WEWS to CBS unless ABC affiliated with three of its stations: WFTS, KNXV-TV in Phoenix (which was also slated to lose its Fox affiliation to New World-owned CBS affiliate KSAZ-TV), and WMAR-TV in Baltimore. Scripps insisted on including WFTS and KNXV in the deal, even though a news department was in construction at KNXV and no movement had yet occurred to build one in Tampa.

The ABC affiliation, confirmed on June 15, set off a mad dash. WFTS had already been planning a new studio facility in the vicinity of Tampa Stadium, and with the ABC tie-up confirmed, management scrambled to hire a news director. With the station's new facility not planned to be ready until late 1995, the news department initially operated from former facilities of the Home Shopping Network in Clearwater.

Another consequence of WFTS replacing WTSP (channel 10) in ABC's affiliate lineup was that it had a more centrally located transmitting facility, which then-ABC president Bob Iger cited as a positive in the switch. That meant that the network would no longer have had a need to affiliate with WWSB (channel 40) in Sarasota, which had aired ABC programming since its 1971 sign-on. WWSB had become an ABC affiliate because WTSP's signal did not reach Sarasota. However, this had become less necessary on technical grounds with high cable television penetration in the Sarasota area, while WFTS-TV's signal reached Sarasota. Coinciding with the Scripps-ABC pact, ABC notified WWSB that it would be terminating its affiliation; though the network gave no reason for its decision, WWSB cited conversations with ABC officials who described it as essential to the broader deal when the Sarasota station petitioned to deny channel 28's license renewal. WWSB ended up winning its battle with ABC and signed a new affiliation contract in March 1995.

On December 12, 1994, WFTS became the market's ABC affiliate, WTSP switched to CBS, and WTVT joined Fox; that same day, WFTS launched local news and broke ground on the new Himes Avenue studio. Most of WFTS's syndicated programs were then acquired by WTVT and WTTA, which also aired Fox Kids in the market.

WFTS was briefly the local over-the-air broadcast partner of the NHL's Tampa Bay Lightning, airing four Lightning games produced by the Sunshine Network during the 2002–03 season. An East Coast traffic hub and the station group–wide graphics operation for Scripps were established at Tampa in 2009, as an open floor was available at the WFTS facility.

On September 24, 2020, a consortium made up of Scripps and Berkshire Hathaway announced the purchase of Ion Media, including local Ion Television station WXPX-TV (channel 66) and the company's technical operations center in Clearwater.

== News operation ==
As an independent station, channel 28's local news staff consisted of just one staffer who produced and hosted news breaks.

Unlike the two Fox stations owned by Scripps that also became Big Three affiliates—KSHB-TV in Kansas City, Missouri, and KNXV-TV—no movement had occurred prior to the affiliation switch on establishing a local news department at WFTS-TV, though station management had been considering the expansion. By the time the affiliation switch was announced, the station was planning a move to the Himes Avenue facility; the station's existing studios at I-4 and Columbus Drive were too small for a news department.

To start producing news, WFTS needed to lease facilities, opting to set up shop in the former Clearwater studios of the Home Shopping Network. Bob Jordan of KCBS-TV in Los Angeles was hired to be the founding news director for 28 Tampa Bay News, which began broadcasting on December 12, 1994. Originally starting with 6 and 11 p.m. newscasts, a flurry of expansions took place during the first four months of 1995, including morning, 5 p.m., and 5:30 p.m.

The other stations have a 50-year head start and are doing great jobs. And then being on ABC hasn't helped when the network has a weak prime time. And there's an ABC station in Sarasota that takes viewers away from us.

— Martie Tucker, WFTS-TV anchor from 1994 to 2003, diagnosing the station's low ratings in her tenure there

The task of building the first new full-scale news service in Tampa Bay against decades-long competitors meant low ratings. WFTS typically rated in third or fourth place in most time slots in its first five years of local news. In 2001, Sam Stallworth and Bill Berra arrived from WSYX–WTTE in Columbus, Ohio, to serve as general manager and news director of WFTS-TV; Jordan was later rehired by his former employer, WFTV in Orlando. The duo refocused the newsroom on hard news and investigative reporting, a prelude to the station rebranding as ABC Action News in October 2002 after a brief time as "28 News".

Ratings remained low, but the station made progress under general manager Richard Pegram, who arrived in 2009 and oversaw the launch of channel 28's first weekend morning newscast. In November 2012, WFTS overtook all other local stations in all evening and late news ratings in the demographic of adults 25–54; this marked the first time WFTS won at 5, 5:30, 6 and 11 p.m. in the key demographic during one ratings period. Pegram was dismissed in 2014, with one source noting he was a difficult boss and heavily involved in the news department.

In 2019, WFTS launched "ABC Action News Streaming Now", a digital news product that included daytime rolling news coverage, simulcasts of channel 28's existing newscasts, and a new 3 p.m. newscast to air on TV and online.

In August 2025, the station dropped the "ABC Action News" branding, rebranding as "Tampa Bay 28" and Tampa Bay 28 News.

=== Notable former on-air staff ===
- Jay Crawford – sports director (1998–2003)
- Scott Hanson – sports anchor (1994–2000)
- Walt Maciborski – anchor/reporter (2005–2009)
- Elaine Quijano – reporter (1998–2000)
- Sage Steele – reporter (1998–2001)

== Technical information and subchannels ==
WFTS-TV broadcasts from a transmitter in Riverview. Its signal is multiplexed:

Subchannels of WFTS-TV
Subchannel	Res.	Short name	Programming
28.1	720p	WFTS-HD	ABC
28.2	480i	BOUNCE	Bounce TV
28.3	480i	GRIT	Grit
28.4	480i	Mystery	Ion Mystery
28.5	480i	HSN	HSN
28.6	480i	SHOP-LC	Shop LC
32.1	1080i	WMOR-TV	WMOR-TV (Independent)

Broadcast on behalf of another station

WFTS is also available in ATSC 3.0 (NextGen TV) on the signal of WMOR-TV (channel 32). In exchange, WFTS hosts WMOR's main subchannel in the ATSC 1.0 format.

=== Analog-to-digital conversion ===
WFTS-TV began broadcasting a digital signal on October 1, 1999. It shut down its analog signal, over UHF channel 28, on June 12, 2009, as part of the federally mandated transition from analog to digital television. The station's digital signal remained on its pre-transition UHF channel 29, using virtual channel 28.
