= Dick Crippen =

American television journalist

Dick Crippen is a former sports and weatherman anchor in the Tampa Bay, Florida, television market. Crippen began his career at ABC affiliate (Now CBS) WLCY-TV Channel 10 in 1965 as one of the station's first on-air personalities. In 1981, he left for rival WFLA-TV. He anchored the evening sportscasts until the late 1990s. In the late 1970s through 1984 he was the public address announcer for Tampa Bay Rowdies home soccer games at Tampa Stadium. He also served as the Tampa Bay Buccaneers' radio play-by-play announcer for the first half of the 1978 season.

Crippen has done play-by-play work on the Water Channel's American Powerboat Television, ESPN's coverage of Unlimited Hydroplane Circuit, as well as NASCAR's Motor Racing Network.

He also hosted an hour-long weekly sports show called Bay Sports with Dick Crippen on the Spectrum Sports cable channel. The show aired on Wednesday evenings at 8 pm and repeated on Friday and Sunday nights at 8 pm. The show ended when Spectrum Sports folded in 2017.

Crippen now works in community development and as senior advisor for the Tampa Bay Rays baseball team. Dick is also a popular speaker speaking on sports, motivation and broadcasting. He is a popular host of many local events, including athletic ceremonies at the University of South Florida.
