= WTSP =

Television station in St. Petersburg, Florida

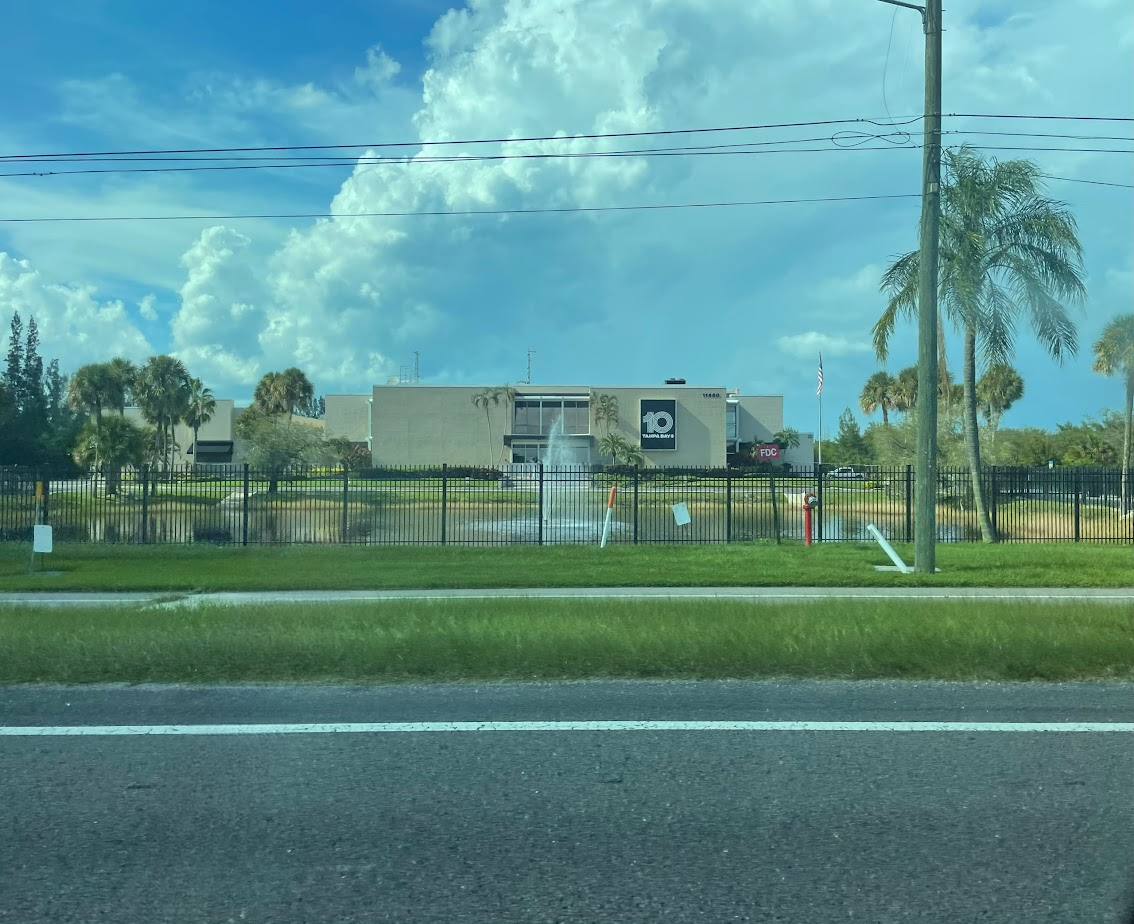
- WTSP's studios in St. Petersburg
- St. Petersburg–Tampa, Florida; United States
- City: St. Petersburg, Florida
- Channels: Digital: 10 (VHF); Virtual: 10
- Branding: 10 Tampa Bay

Programming
- Affiliations: 10.1: CBS; for others, see § Subchannels

Ownership
- Owner: Tegna Inc., a subsidiary of Nexstar Media Group; (TEGNA East Coast Broadcasting, LLC)
- Sister stations: Nexstar: WFLA-TV, WTTA, WSNN-LD

History
- First air date: July 18, 1965
- Former call signs: WLCY-TV (1965–1978)
- Former channel numbers: Analog: 10 (VHF, 1965–2009); Digital: 24 (UHF, 2000–2009)
- Former affiliations: Independent (July–September 1965); ABC (September 1965–1994)
- Call sign meaning: Tampa/St. Petersburg

Technical information
- Licensing authority: FCC
- Facility ID: 11290
- ERP: 69 kW
- HAAT: 476.9 m (1,565 ft)
- Transmitter coordinates: 27°49′10.8″N 82°15′38″W
- Translator(s): 4 (VHF) Hernando

Links
- Public license information: Public file; LMS
- Website: www.wtsp.com

WTSP (channel 10) is a television station licensed to St. Petersburg, Florida, United States, serving the Tampa Bay area as an affiliate of CBS. The station is owned by the Tegna subsidiary of Nexstar Media Group; Nexstar also owns NBC affiliate WFLA-TV (channel 8), CW station WTTA (channel 38), and WSNN-LD (channel 39). WTSP maintains studios on Gandy Boulevard on St. Petersburg's northeast side, just off the Gandy Bridge; its transmitter is located in Riverview, Florida.

Channel 10 was a latter-day insertion into the Tampa Bay television market, and six groups competed for the channel between 1957 and 1964. Rahall Communications, owner of St. Petersburg radio station WLCY, was awarded the construction permit, and WLCY-TV began broadcasting on July 18, 1965, becoming Tampa Bay's ABC affiliate that September. For technical reasons, the channel 10 transmitter had to be further north than all other local stations, and the initial tower height was limited to 549 feet (167 m). As a result, the station had a smaller coverage area and potential audience than its principal competitors, WFLA-TV and WTVT. This situation also led to the construction of WXLT (now WWSB) in Sarasota in 1971, providing ABC service to the southern portion of the market but limiting WLCY-TV's reach. A taller tower was constructed in 1979, but the station was unable to move to Riverview until 2011.

In 1977, Gulf United Corporation acquired Rahall Communications and used it as the base of the Gulf Broadcast Group, with corporate headquarters in St. Petersburg. Channel 10 was separated from WLCY radio and changed call signs to WTSP. Under Gulf, a news department previously regarded as under-resourced and amateurish became professionalized and moved into second place in local ratings, at one point challenging WTVT for first place. After Gulf was acquired by Taft Broadcasting, which in turn was taken over and became Great American Broadcasting, momentum was lost in the mid-to-late 1980s, and the station slipped to third. In 1989, the news director and assistant news director were fired when it emerged they had accessed WTVT's computer systems and used them to make decisions about news coverage at WTSP. Despite various overhauls, the news department rarely moved above third place. On December 12, 1994, a three-station affiliation switch saw WTSP become a CBS affiliate. News ratings did not improve as WTSP's new CBS programming attracted older viewers.

Jacor acquired WTSP in 1996 and swapped it to Gannett months later in exchange for six radio stations. Under Gannett—whose broadcasting division became Tegna in 2015—WTSP has remained either in second or third place in local news ratings, having tried several strategies to change its approach and presentation over that time. In 2026, Tegna merged with Nexstar Media Group, owner of WFLA-TV, WTTA, and WSNN-LD in the Tampa Bay market.

== History ==
=== Construction and early years ===
When the Federal Communications Commission (FCC) allocated television channels in 1952 after lifting a multi-year freeze on new stations, the Tampa Bay area had been allocated channels 3 (for educational use), 8, and 13 in the very high frequency (VHF) band and 38 in the ultra high frequency (UHF) band. The final plan assigned channel 38 instead of the previously contemplated channel 10. Channel 38 was occupied by WSUN-TV, owned by the city of St. Petersburg, beginning in 1953; the two commercial VHF channels opened in 1955 as WFLA-TV (channel 8) in February and WTVT (channel 13) in April.

In January 1955, three St. Petersburg men formed the Suncoast Cities Broadcasting Corporation and asked the FCC to allocate channel 10 to Pinellas County, in hopes of "prevent[ing] the major network television activity from being concentrated in Tampa". The channel had previously been requested by Jacksonville station WJHP-TV, which intended to locate it at Bunnell, Florida. When WJHP's owners, the Jacksonville Journal, acquired WESH in Daytona Beach, their application was disqualified. The commission allocated channel 10 to New Port Richey, sufficiently far enough from Miami where channel 10 could be allocated, on May 15, 1957. (Note: The FCC quickly dropped the New Port Richey license and assigned channel 10 more broadly to Tampa–St. Petersburg.) The announcement stirred interest from seven different applicants, some of whom had lost in their attempts to obtain channels 8 or 13: Orange Broadcasting Company, headed by a Tampa department store executive; Walter Tison, the former owner of Tampa's WTVT, and a consortium from Clearwater; Suncoast Cities Broadcasting Corporation; Robert A. James, a Tampa businessman associated with the failed bid of Tampa Bay Area Telecasting Corporation; Nelson Poynter, president of the St. Petersburg Times newspaper and former owner of St. Petersburg radio station WTSP (1380 AM); the Rahall group, the current owners of WTSP; and the city of St. Petersburg, which had previously attempted to obtain channel 3 for its use to ensure the continued operation of WSUN-TV. Joining later in the proceeding was Tampa Broadcasters, Inc., owner of Tampa radio station WALT. St. Petersburg officials viewed obtaining channel 10 as necessary for WSUN-TV to continue. An attorney representing the stations called the proceeding a "life or death matter" for the station, which had thrived in the time between it went on the air and WFLA and WTVT began telecasting. National sponsors were shunning UHF stations like WSUN-TV in favor of VHF stations like WFLA and WTVT.

By the time the FCC set hearings on channel 10, there were six applicants in contention. All of them would be limited to towers of 549 feet (167 m) or less at New Port Richey due to aviation restrictions:

- Florida Gulfcoast Broadcasters, the Nelson Poynter group;
- the city of St. Petersburg;
- Suncoast Cities Broadcasting Corporation;
- the Rahall group, incorporated as WTSP-TV, Inc.;
- Tampa Telecasters, Inc., led by Kenneth R. Giddens; and
- Bay Area Telecasting Corporation, led by former CBS executive J. L. Van Volkenburg.

Though the applicant was still named WTSP-TV, Inc., co-owned WTSP radio changed its call sign to WLCY on July 14, 1959.

On February 1, 1961, FCC hearing examiner Millard French handed down an initial decision favoring WTSP-TV, Inc., the Rahall application, for the channel 10 grant. French favored WTSP-TV's proposed programming and program planning and found in favor of it on the factors of integration of ownership and management and the company's past broadcast record. He ruled out Gulfcoast on diversification of media ownership grounds, given Poynter's ownership of the St. Petersburg Times, and its proposal to locate studios only at Largo; found WSUN-TV's programming and broadcast experience poor, outweighing positives of the application; and gave few other preferences to the remaining applications. Multiple losing applicants contested French's initial decision. In September, the commission found in favor of the Rahall application on a 3–2 vote, with two of the FCC's seven commissioners not participating and two dissenters who would have awarded the channel to WSUN-TV. In addition to further challenges by the losing applicants, the FCC's Broadcast Bureau objected to the decision based on changes in the format of WLCY since the initial decision, writing, "WLCY is no longer a station with a record of considerable time devoted to live, religious, discussion and agricultural programming. ... It has instead converted to a disc jockey and news format." As a result, the commission rescinded the grant and ordered more hearings. After the hearings, the Broadcast Bureau recommended WTSP-TV, Inc., be disqualified, claiming it lacked the character to be a broadcast licensee, but the examiner again found in its favor, leading to yet more appeals. In November 1964, the commission upheld the award to WTSP-TV, Inc.

As early as 1961, Rahall had a commitment for the new station to affiliate with ABC, whose programs had been seen on WSUN-TV. In 1962, Rahall signed an agreement with a general contractor to construct studios, which would be located with the existing WLCY radio studios at 11450 Gandy Boulevard. To get the station on the air faster, Rahall built temporary studios at 2429 Central Avenue.

WLCY-TV began broadcasting on July 18, 1965. It operated as an independent station until September 1, when WSUN-TV's ABC affiliation agreement expired; the first ABC program on channel 10 aired following a special dedication featuring Florida governor Haydon Burns. Work on the permanent studio facility on Gandy Boulevard began in 1967 and was completed the next year. In 1970, an FM radio station, WLCY-FM 94.9, was added to the operation.

In the Rahall era, WLCY-TV produced several local non-news programs, including a local version of the children's program Romper Room, the Russ Byrd Morning Program, and a local exercise show, The Fran Carlton Show.

=== Tower woes ===
Shortly after going on the air, Rahall petitioned the FCC to let WLCY-TV move its transmitter site to a proposed 1,500 feet (460 m) tower in Hillsborough County southeast of Riverview, an antenna farm where other stations were located. The application received two objections. One was from Miami's channel 10 station, concerned about interference from the more southerly site. The other was WSUN-TV, which claimed that any improvement of WLCY-TV's signal would cause it economic hardship. An FCC examiner and the commission's review board each denied the move, finding that WSUN-TV's "marginal coverage advantage ... may spell the difference between survival and failure" for that station and that a move would thus harm the development of UHF television in Tampa Bay and fail to maintain minimum separation to the Miami station. This decision left WLCY-TV on the shorter tower, already in the opposite direction from the other stations for most viewers, and gave it a coverage area 65 percent the size of WFLA and WTVT. While WLCY-TV fared better in the core metropolitan area, this transmitter deficiency hurt its ratings. In May 1977, Arbitron reported that WLCY-TV had finished fourth in ratings behind St. Petersburg UHF station WTOG-TV (channel 44) in sign-on to sign-off ratings, an unusual occurrence of an independent station beating a network affiliate. WLCY-TV's underperformance came just as ABC experienced an increase in its national ratings.

Another effect of the tower disadvantage was to create a void in ABC reception to the south of Tampa Bay. Viewers in areas such as Sarasota, Bradenton, and Venice needed cable to watch ABC programs. This led to the construction of WXLT-TV (channel 40) in Sarasota as an ABC affiliate serving six southwestern Florida counties. That station began providing ABC and local programming to 140,000 homes, replacing WLCY-TV on cable systems in its area, when it debuted on October 23, 1971. WXLT, which became WWSB in 1986, served to leave channel 10 with virtually no ratings in Sarasota County by 1988.

In 1972, Rahall made a second attempt at improving its tower facility, this time by building a new, 1,495-foot (456 m) tower to increase its coverage area by 40 percent. WXLT and, for a time, WTOG-TV objected, with WXLT claiming it would lose viewers and advertisers were the new tower to be built. The commission and review board approved the tower. Having lost at the FCC, WXLT unsuccessfully attempted to have a local court halt construction of the tower. The $1.5 million tower and transmitter facility were activated in June 1979. In January 1981, the station was allowed to change its city of license from Largo to St. Petersburg.

=== The Gulf and Taft era ===
Gulf United Corporation—the parent company of Gulf Life, Florida's largest life insurer—announced it would acquire Rahall Communications in February 1977 as part of a push into broadcasting. To comply with ownership rules, Gulf United had to divest the radio stations to acquire WLCY-TV. It sold the radio stations to Harte-Hanks, with WYNF-FM (the former WLCY-FM) being further sold to Taft Broadcasting.

When the $38 million acquisition closed in September 1978, it made the Rahall brothers the single largest owners of Gulf United. Since WLCY radio and television had been separated, the television station took a new call sign: WTSP, for Tampa–St. Petersburg.

Twice, in 1977 and 1982, ABC—which was looking to upgrade its affiliate base nationally—attempted to convince WFLA-TV to induce an affiliation switch. In 1977, WFLA chose to stay with NBC; in 1982, conversations never progressed to a discussion of financial compensation, and WFLA again stuck with NBC on account of Fred Silverman no longer running that network.

Gulf United was acquired by Houston-based American General in 1983. As part of the transaction, its non-insurance businesses was spun off to Gulf United shareholders as an independent company, Gulf Broadcast Company, based in St. Petersburg. In 1985, Taft Broadcasting acquired most of Gulf Broadcast; Taft, which already owned WYNF-FM and WSUN (620 AM), had to sell the stations again to meet FCC ownership limits; the two Tampa Bay stations and three others were sold to CBS. On October 12, 1987, an investment group led by Carl Lindner Jr. completed a hostile takeover of Taft Broadcasting from the Taft family, which had owned the company; the Taft Broadcasting name remained with the Taft family, and the reorganized firm became Great American Broadcasting Company. Great American returned to Tampa Bay radio by acquiring WKRL (97.9 FM) from Sandusky Radio in 1989; the station was relaunched as WXTB.

The 1987 Taft buyout saddled Great American with a substantial debt load it could no longer service, and other subsidiaries of Great American Communications Corporation filed for Chapter 11 bankruptcy protection in 1993, a move that did not affect the television and radio holdings. After emerging from bankruptcy, Great American Broadcasting changed its name to Citicasters.

=== Affiliation switch to CBS ===
On May 23, 1994, Fox announced it had agreed to affiliate with 12 stations owned by New World Communications, including WTVT in Tampa. CBS now needed a new affiliate, and WTSP was identified as the most attractive station to replace WTVT as an affiliate. As part of a group agreement with Scripps-Howard Broadcasting, ABC announced on June 17 that it would move to the former Fox affiliate, WFTS-TV (channel 28). This left WTSP seeking a network and CBS still seeking a local affiliate. WTSP signed with CBS on June 23, setting up a three-station affiliation switch; morning programming moved in September, with CBS This Morning airing on WTSP beginning September 12, and prime time shows moved on December 12. The deal left WTSP with an older audience delivered by CBS programming but struggling to attract younger viewers.

=== Jacor and Gannett/Tegna ownership ===
Citicasters was acquired by Jacor Communications, another Cincinnati media concern, for $770 million in 1996. At the time, Citicasters owned two television stations and 19 radio stations. In radio, the purchase was significant as the combination of Citicasters and Jacor created a six-station cluster. Jacor intended to keep WTSP and Cincinnati's WKRC-TV, but it was approached by the Gannett Company about a possible trade, which was finalized in September 1996. In dealing WTSP to Gannett, Jacor acquired six radio stations, including Los Angeles's KIIS-FM, at the time that city's top-billing radio station, as well as two Tampa Bay–area outlets, WDAE (1250 AM) and WUSA-FM 100.7. Conversely, WTSP became Gannett's 16th television station, and Gannett became WTSP's fifth owner within a decade. On June 29, 2015, the Gannett Company split in two, with one side specializing in print media and the other side specializing in broadcast and digital media. WTSP was retained by the latter company, named Tegna.

On August 19, 2025, Nexstar Media Group announced it would acquire Tegna for $6.2 billion. In Tampa Bay, Nexstar already owned WFLA and WTTA (channel 38). The deal was completed on March 19, 2026, and included approval for Nexstar to own three station licenses in markets such as Tampa Bay. A temporary restraining order issued one week later by the U.S. District Court for the Eastern District of California, later escalated to a preliminary injunction, has prevented Nexstar from integrating the stations.

== News operation ==
=== Early years ===
From the standpoint of audience size and general local program quality, the St. Petersburg station so far has had to settle for the image of a poor cousin. It continues to operate with a small, relatively inexperienced staff using whatever gimmicks it can to attract viewers. And so attractive, blonde, Karol Kelly reports the weather. And sports director Dick Crippen feels free to jazz up his program with personal opinion.

— Paul Schnitt, St. Petersburg Times

WLCY-TV debuted news when it launched in 1965. Its lead anchor was Marshall Cleaver, who had previously worked at WTSP/WLCY radio and before then for Rahall in Allentown, Pennsylvania. As with other areas of the station, the operation was small, justified as an economy move; comparatively young and inexperienced; and hindered by the inferior transmission facility. In 1971, WLCY radio and TV news director Art Johnson conceded to the St. Petersburg Times, "Obviously, we can't compete with Channel 8 and 13 in news." In 1975, former WFLA-TV assistant news director Arch Deal, famous as a parachutist, joined the channel 10 staff as an assistant news director and co-anchor of the station's Eyewitness News newscasts with Cleaver.

In April 1977, Todd Spoeri became the general manager of WLCY-TV. He instituted a staff shakeup, including firing Cleaver, and moved the early evening newscast from 5:30 to an hour at 6 p.m. Deal was demoted from news director and departed shortly thereafter. The news staff was doubled from nine to eighteen employees, and the station ran advertisements with such headlines as "They used to laugh at us. They aren't laughing any more." and "They don't have Channel 10 to kick around any more." The move to put WLCY-TV news in direct competition with WFLA and WTVT caused the station's already low 6 p.m. news ratings to fall further. During Spoeri's 18 months at the station, the station changed news directors twice and experienced a near-total turnover in news staff. Among his last hires was Wally Kinnan, a veteran TV meteorologist who arrived at WTSP from WKYC-TV in Cleveland.

=== Action News: Contending for second ===
Shortly after, the station hired anchor Don Harrison from KMSP-TV in Minneapolis. Harrison lasted two years at the station before leaving for a job with Headline News. In a 1982 interview, Harrison described the reputation of WTSP's news department at the time: "When I came in, people watched Action News for camp. What was going to happen next? What was going to act up next? A joke." Daniel Ruth in The Tampa Tribune wrote that the station's theme song "would have been played to the strains of a circus calliope" and compared the newscasts unfavorably to Saturday Night Live's Weekend Update segments. In the years that followed, the station overhauled its news department, adding an investigative unit, leasing a helicopter, and improving its production values. The helicopter provided the first live images of the 1980 Sunshine Skyway collapse. Kinnan was replaced in 1980 by Dick Fletcher. By 1982, the news staff had grown to 50 people; WTSP's 11 p.m. newscast was tying or surpassing WFLA-TV's in the ratings, and the 6 p.m. newscast was pulling closer to second-rated WFLA. A WTSP special report on migrant laborers, Prisoners of the Harvest, won a George Foster Peabody Award in 1983; the reporter, Mark Feldstein, joined ABC News as a correspondent.

In the mid-1980s, WTSP was firmly in a second-place position in the local news—where it had once finished fourth. The Nielsen ratings for July 1985 showed its 11 p.m. news tying longtime leader WTVT in the ratings and surpassing it by 2,000 households, though Arbitron reported a substantial distance between the two stations. Walt Belcher praised the station's coverage of Hurricane Elena that September, noting that it "might have the best-looking newscast in the Bay area" and "proved it has the graphics, talent, and hustle to match [WTVT]". Karl Vick of the St. Petersburg Times credited WTSP's modern news presentation with forcing changes at its competitors, WXFL (Note: WFLA-TV was known as WXFL from 1983 to 1988.) and WTVT. With this momentum behind it, in September 1986, WTSP changed its evening news at 6 p.m. from half-hour to an hour, competing head-to-head with WTVT and leaving WXFL with the only 6 p.m. half-hour report. The change was not a success. Where once it seemed like WTSP might supplant WTVT as the most-watched early evening newscast, it suddenly found itself tied with WXFL. The move was undone after less than a year, and by July 1988 WTSP was in third and a resurgent WXFL had tied WTVT in the 6 p.m. news ratings race.

=== 1989 newsroom hacking scandal ===
In 1988, WTSP hired Terry Cole of KWCH-TV in Wichita, Kansas, as its new news director. Cole's focus was to make WTSP news competitive with its rivals; his biggest priority was giving the station a news presence in the mornings, which debuted as Good Morning Florida in January 1989, and he was interested in adding a second early evening newscast. Ratings appeared to be improving under Cole, though the change in direction also saw an increase in crime stories and an excessive use of live shots and so-called "exclusive" stories.

Cole hired Michael Shapiro as assistant news director: though Cole and Shapiro worked together in the early 1980s at KTIV in Sioux City, Iowa, Shapiro last worked at WTVT. There, he was the assignments manager, with responsibility for story planning and daily news coverage. While at WTVT, Shapiro oversaw the installation and maintenance of WTVT's Basys newsroom computer system. When he was hired, he brought with him a manual for the Basys and a diskette which contained personnel files, among them copies of contracts for four WTVT news employees including anchor Hugh Smith. Another WTVT employee, Cary Williams, let Shapiro keep his password to the WTVT computer system, under the impression he could read sports wire copy and send him electronic messages. From his home and from WTSP, at Cole's direction, Shapiro accessed WTVT's newsroom computer system on at least 14 occasions. Cole and Shapiro used the information to learn WTVT's plans for story coverage, notes from reporters' interviews, and the names of the station's sources. Shapiro frequently used information gleaned from the WTVT files to determine or change the order of stories aired on WTSP's evening newscasts, and he handed out copies of WTVT's coverage plans to staffers in WTSP news meetings. The accesses were not noticed by WTVT until January 12, when that station's morning news producer found that stories, research files, and evening news files were missing. The files had been purged in a 54-minute period when someone on a personal computer had logged in. That login came from a code belonging to assistant news director Bob Franklin, but Franklin did not have a modem and had never used the codes. Shapiro, who had been trained on the Basys, denied any knowledge of the events. The station contacted the Florida Department of Law Enforcement (FDLE) and General Telephone Company of Florida. Because Shapiro had moved to St. Petersburg, calls back to WTVT in Tampa were traceable long-distance calls. General Telephone uncovered that he had dialed into the system from WTSP three times in early January, that the 54-minute phone call originated from Shapiro's new home phone, and that someone at Shapiro's home phone had attempted to log in to the system six times on January 26.

On February 7, 1989, the FDLE arrested Shapiro at his home and charged him with 14 felony counts of computer-related crime. WTVT reported that, at Cole's house, FDLE agents collected evidence including computer software and manuals that were still the property of WTVT. On a tip, state investigators later searched WTSP and found a folder hidden behind a storage shed that contained printouts of the personnel files. Rumors swirled in the WTSP newsroom over the presence of printouts from WTVT computer systems.

Cole and Shapiro were fired by WTSP on March 14. General manager Vince Barresi noted in a statement, "[A]s a news organization, we realize that if at all possible we must avoid any questions about the objective way we do our business in keeping the public informed through our newscast." Don North of WKRC-TV in Cincinnati, which was co-owned with WTSP, was seconded to Tampa to serve as the interim news director before the station hired Mel Martin of WJXT in Jacksonville the next month.

Though Cole was fired by WTSP, he was not charged by authorities until April 10. The two men pled no contest on May 19 and were sentenced by a Hillsborough County circuit judge to five years of probation, 250 hours of community service, and a small fine. While the state could have pursued a racketeering case against WTSP to seize the station, it opted not to start a years-long, expensive case and reached a $750,000 settlement with WTSP. Two computers used to access WTVT systems were obtained by the Florida Department of Law Enforcement, under a law allowing for the seizure of equipment used to commit a felony. WTVT and WTSP entered into an out-of-court settlement in October.

=== Stuck in third ===
Mel Martin, as the news director, led the continuation of several projects planned under Cole. WTSP computerized its newsroom; it was the last station in the market to do so. In September, the station changed newscast titles from Action News to NewsCenter 10 and introduced a new logo. Simultaneously, it launched a 5 p.m. newscast co-anchored by Darryl David, previously of WMAQ-TV in Chicago, and Jineane Ford, a former Miss USA who had been anchoring in Phoenix. A second evening meteorologist, Dennis Feltgen, was hired. Ford, who had apparently been promised by Cole that she would succeed Sheryl Browne at 6 and 11 p.m., departed two years later to return to Phoenix.

Steve Mauldin became general manager in 1991, after Barresi's departure. In the year that followed, WTSP experienced turnover of executives and talent, from news director Mel Martin to investigative reporter Kevin Kalwary. In late 1992, the station's main evening anchors both left. John Wilson departed for WTVT, while Sheryl Browne resigned after being removed from the 11 p.m. newscast. Martin told Janis D. Froelich of the St. Petersburg Times that Mauldin had made WTSP "an abysmal place to work". One of Mauldin's new hires, anchor Jane Akre, was fired by the station in 1994 and filed a breach of contract lawsuit, all while pregnant. A 5:30 p.m. newscast was added in mid-1994, with the station splitting to two anchor teams. Among the new hires was Pat Minarcin, who joined from a station in Albany, New York. Ratings were mostly flat after the CBS affiliation switch. Minarcin and Sue Zelenko were promoted to the main 5, 6, and 11 p.m. newscasts in April 1995.

Despite moving into second-place in 6 and 11 p.m. news ratings in November 1997, WTSP management opted to replace Minarcin with Reginald Roundtree, who became the first Black main evening anchor in Tampa Bay, in February 1998. After remaining on the payroll for 18 months, Minarcin sued, claiming age discrimination and that the station had failed to help him find employment; an arbitrator ruled in his favor in 2002. The station's newscasts remained in third place, but morning ratings remained low, in large part because of poor ratings for CBS This Morning.

=== In the 2000s ===
In October 2002, WTSP overhauled its image with a new name ("Tampa Bay's 10"), a new slogan ("Enjoy it. We do.", referring to local life), a new logo, and a new 5 p.m. news and features program, Life Around the Bay. It had a softer format that Eric Deggans of the St. Petersburg Times compared to network morning shows such as The Today Show and The Early Show. News director Lane Michaelsen noted that Life Around the Bay was a response to what he called the "sameness" of local TV news. Within six months, Life Around the Bay moved to 4 p.m. as a counterprogramming move; it was the first time WTSP did not have a 5 p.m. weeknight newscast since 1989, but observers at other stations characterized it as WTSP giving up. However, the decision to program the popular syndicated talk show Dr. Phil at 5 p.m. helped the station win the time slot and pushed the station's 6 p.m. news to second place.

Life Around the Bay lost that title in January 2008, when WTSP began broadcasting its local newscasts in high definition and retooled the 4 p.m. newscast to a more traditional format. That October, the station rebranded as 10 Connects as part of a reorientation of the news department to promote connection with viewers and multimedia capability. The year also saw a change in the weather department as Fletcher died of a stroke in February and was replaced by Tammie Souza, the market's first female chief meteorologist. The 4 p.m. news was discontinued altogether in May 2009, and by June 2010 the station had newscasts at 5 and 5:30 p.m. again. The 10 Connects moniker was dropped later that year because it confused viewers.

=== 2017 overhaul ===
Logo used from 2020 to 2026

In 2017, WTSP debuted a new logo, several new on-air personalities, and a new morning news format. Known as 10News Brightside, the revamped morning program shifted from a more typical presentation toward a discussion of trending stories on social media. Two new anchors to the market hosted Brightside: Jackie Fernandez and Rob Finnerty. The 11 p.m. news was renamed Nightside.

WTSP has continued to rate third or fourth in local news. In 2020, it was fourth of four stations in total households and viewers aged 25–54 at 11 p.m. Four years later, it was third in total households but last in viewers aged 25–54. As of June 2025, WTSP aired 30 1/2 hours a week of local newscasts.

WTSP's studio location, on Tampa Bay, is in an evacuation zone for hurricanes. During Hurricane Elena in 1985, the station was off the air for seven and a half hours to comply with evacuation orders. In 2004, WTSP was off the air twice at the height of Hurricane Charley due to evacuation orders and at one point broadcast from a public-access television studio.

== Former notable on-air staff ==
- Jane Akre – reporter and 5 p.m. anchor, 1992–1994
- Bubba the Love Sponge – commentator, 2011
- Michelle Caruso-Cabrera – reporter, 1994–1998
- Dick Crippen – sports director, 1965–1981
- Arch Deal – news director and anchor, 1975–1977
- Mike Deeson – investigative reporter, 1982–2017
- Rich Fields – meteorologist, 2017-2023
- Rob Finnerty – morning anchor, 2017–2020
- Dick Fletcher – chief meteorologist, 1980–2008
- Jineane Ford – 5 p.m. anchor and reporter, 1989–1991
- Gina Gaston – anchor/reporter
- Don Harrison – anchor, 1979–1981
- Wally Kinnan – chief meteorologist, 1978–1980
- Dion Lim – evening anchor, 2014–2017
- Miles O'Brien – reporter, 1985–1986
- Noah Pransky – investigative reporter, 2009–2018
- Simeon Rice – co-host of The Blitz, local NFL pregame show for 2021 season
- Craig Sager – weatherman and sports anchor/reporter, c. 1975
- Tammie Souza – chief meteorologist, 2008–2011

== Technical information ==
WTSP's main transmitter is located near Riverview; the station also broadcasts from a digital replacement translator near Hernando. Its signal is multiplexed:

Subchannels of WTSP
| Subchannel | Res. | Short name | Programming |
|---|---|---|---|
| 10.1 | 1080i | WTSP-HD | CBS |
| 10.2 | 480i | Quest | Quest |
| 10.3 | 480i | Crime | True Crime Network |
| 10.4 | 480i | NEST | The Nest |
| 49.10 | 1080i | WRMD-SD | Telemundo (WRMD-CD) |
| 32.2 | 480i | MeTV | MeTV (WMOR-TV) |

Simulcast of subchannels of another station
Broadcast on behalf of another station

WTSP began broadcasting a digital signal on May 15, 2000, on UHF channel 24 from its northerly transmitter site near Holiday. The station ceased analog broadcasting on June 12, 2009, as part of the digital television transition. To counter issues with poor reception, the FCC authorized the station to double its power in February 2010. In 2011, WTSP relocated to Riverview, from which most other Tampa Bay TV stations broadcast. As this move caused a loss of reception in the northernmost reaches of its previous coverage area, the station built a digital replacement translator at Hernando to serve communities including Crystal River, Beverly Hills, and Inverness.

WTSP is also available in ATSC 3.0 (NextGen TV) on the signal of WMOR-TV (channel 32). In exchange, WTSP hosts a subchannel of WMOR-TV in the ATSC 1.0 format.
