= WXPX-TV =

Television station in Bradenton, Florida

- Bradenton–Tampa–St. Petersburg, Florida; United States
- City: Bradenton, Florida
- Channels: Digital: 29 (UHF); Virtual: 66
- Branding: The Spot Tampa Bay 66

Programming
- Affiliations: 66.1: Independent; 66.2: Ion Television; for others, see § Technical information and subchannels

Ownership
- Owner: E. W. Scripps Company; (Ion Media License Company, LLC)
- Sister stations: WFTS-TV

History
- First air date: August 1, 1994
- Former call signs: WFCT (1994–1998)
- Former channel numbers: Analog: 66 (UHF, 1994–2009); Digital: 42 (UHF, until 2020)
- Former affiliations: Independent (1994–1998); inTV (1998); Pax/i/Ion (1998–2025, now on 66.2)
- Call sign meaning: X to differentiate from other Ion stations, PX for Pax TV (former affiliation, now on 66.2)

Technical information
- Licensing authority: FCC
- Facility ID: 6601
- ERP: 218 kW
- HAAT: 475 m (1,558 ft)
- Transmitter coordinates: 27°49′10.8″N 82°15′38″W

Links
- Public license information: Public file; LMS
- Website: www.thespottv.com/tampa-bay-66

WXPX-TV (channel 66), branded as The Spot Tampa Bay 66, is an independent television station licensed to Bradenton, Florida, United States, serving the Tampa Bay area. It is owned by the E. W. Scripps Company alongside ABC affiliate WFTS-TV (channel 28). The two stations share studios on North Himes Avenue on Tampa's northwest side; WXPX-TV's transmitter is located in Riverview, Florida.

Channel 66 went on the air as WFCT on August 1, 1994. It broadcast programming from The Worship Network and infomercials. Programmed from the start by Paxson Communications Corporation, forerunner to Ion Media, it changed its call sign to WXPX in 1998 as part of the launch of Pax TV, later Ion Television. Scripps acquired Ion Media in 2020 and, upon gaining television rights to the Tampa Bay Lightning hockey team in 2025, split WXPX off as an independent station.

== History ==
=== Construction ===
In 1987, a group filed to build a station on the unused channel 66 allocation at Bradenton, Florida, just before the Federal Communications Commission (FCC) froze most licensing activity in top-30 markets to study digital television channel needs. Eleven applicants filed, and seven remained in the running when FCC administrative law judge Richard Sippel selected Bradenton Broadcast Television Co. Ltd., run by Anita F. Rogers, in an initial decision handed down in April 1989.

Channel 66 received its permit as WTGB in 1992. Rogers was introduced to Lowell Paxson, who had left the Home Shopping Network to found Christian Network, Inc. This firm funded channel 66, which would air programming from the Paxson-owned The Worship Network. Christian Network formed part of a strategy by Paxson to have commercial and Christian stations in each of Orlando, Tampa, and Miami. When channel 66 began broadcasting as WFCT on August 1, 1994, it aired infomercials for 12 hours a day, two hours of Worship programming in prime time, and overnight sacred music. When Paxson Communications Corporation launched its Infomall TV infomercial network the next year, WFCT was one of its first stations.

=== Pax, i, and Ion ===
Paxson Communications Corporation exercised its options to directly acquire Christian Network–owned WFCT and WCTD in Miami in August 1997. On August 31, 1998, under new WXPX-TV call letters, the station became a launch outlet for the new Pax TV network. In 2000, WXPX signed a joint sales agreement with Tampa NBC affiliate WFLA-TV (channel 8) that included WFLA selling WXPX advertising and WXPX sharing WFLA newscasts. Initially, WFLA produced live 7 and 10 p.m. newscasts for WXPX, which was the only station in the network to rebroadcast NBC Nightly News and one of three to offer live news. The 7 p.m. news was scrapped and changed to a rebroadcast in October 2001, while the 10 p.m. followed in early 2002 after Pax opted not to keep paying to produce it. Beginning in 2003, WXPX was the television home of Tampa Bay Devil Rays baseball, airing 65 to 67 games a season between 2003 and 2008. Two cable-only regional sports networks, Fox Sports Florida and Sun Sports, split rights beginning in 2009.

After canceling all of its joint sales agreements and changing its name to i: Independent Television in 2005, the network became known as Ion Television in 2007, following the 2006 name change of Paxson Communications Corporation to Ion Media Networks. The E. W. Scripps Company, owner in Tampa Bay of ABC affiliate WFTS-TV (channel 28), acquired Ion Media in 2020.

=== The Spot ===
On May 14, 2025, it was announced that WXPX would become an independent station, branded as "The Spot, Tampa Bay 66", on July 1. The new format was anchored by Scripps Sports's acquisition of regional rights to the Tampa Bay Lightning hockey team, whose games would air on WXPX.

== Technical information and subchannels ==
WXPX-TV's transmitter is located in Riverview, Florida. The station's signal is multiplexed:

Subchannels of WXPX-TV
Subchannel	Res.	Short name	Programming
66.1	720p	WXPX-HD	Independent
66.2	480i	ION	Ion
66.3	480i	CourtTV	Court TV
66.4	480i	Laff	Laff
66.5	480i	IONPlus	Ion Plus
66.6	480i	BUSTED	Busted
66.7	480i	GameSho	Game Show Central
66.8	480i	QVC	QVC

=== Analog-to-digital conversion ===
WXPX-TV began broadcasting a digital signal on channel 42 on January 1, 2003. It shut down its analog signal on June 12, 2009, as part of the digital television transition. WXPX-TV relocated its signal from channel 42 to channel 29 on January 17, 2020, as a result of the 2016 United States wireless spectrum auction.
