= WTVT =

Television station in Tampa, Florida

- Tampa–St. Petersburg, Florida; United States
- City: Tampa, Florida
- Channels: Digital: 12 (VHF); Virtual: 13
- Branding: Fox 13 Tampa Bay; Fox 13 News

Programming
- Affiliations: 13.1: Fox; for others, see § Subchannels

Ownership
- Owner: Fox Television Stations; (New World Communications of Tampa, Inc.)

History
- First air date: April 1, 1955
- Former channel numbers: Analog: 13 (VHF, 1955–2009)
- Former affiliations: CBS (1955–1994)
- Call sign meaning: Dual meaning: Walter Tison and Virginia Tison (original owner and his wife); -or-; "Television Tampa"

Technical information
- Licensing authority: FCC
- Facility ID: 68569
- ERP: 72.3 kW
- HAAT: 436 m (1,430 ft)
- Transmitter coordinates: 27°49′8″N 82°14′26″W

Links
- Public license information: Public file; LMS
- Website: www.fox13news.com

WTVT (channel 13) is a television station licensed to Tampa, Florida, United States, serving as the Fox network outlet for the Tampa Bay area. Owned and operated by the network's Fox Television Stations division, WTVT maintains studios on Kennedy Boulevard on Tampa's west side, and its transmitter is located in Riverview.

== History ==
=== CBS affiliation ===
The station first signed on the air on April 1, 1955, becoming the third television station in Tampa Bay after WSUN-TV (channel 38) and WFLA-TV (channel 8); it is the second-oldest surviving station in the market behind WFLA. Upon its launch, WTVT took over the CBS affiliation from WSUN-TV. WTVT was originally owned by Tampa Bay radio veteran Walter Tison and his Tampa Television Company. The Federal Communications Commission (FCC) originally awarded the construction permit to build a station on channel 13 to the Tampa Times newspaper, which owned WDAE (1250 AM). However, the FCC reversed its decision and awarded the license to the Tison group, which intended to open a studio facility in nearby St. Petersburg. The Times appealed the FCC's decision, but lost. Although it appears that the station's call letters stand for "Television Tampa", they actually stand for the initials of Walter Tison and his wife, Virginia. Like many other stations located on "unlucky" channel 13, WTVT used a black cat as its mascot for several years.

In 1956, the Tampa Television Company merged with the Oklahoma City-based Oklahoma Publishing Company (OPUBCO). OPUBCO's broadcasting subsidiary, the WKY Radiophone Company, would later be known as Gaylord Broadcasting, named for the family that owned the company.

The station's remote broadcast facilities were chosen for network pool coverage of Alan Shepard and John Glenn's Mercury capsule splashdowns (in 1961 and 1962, respectively). The mobile unit recorded the recoveries on videotapes that were flown to the mainland.

In 1987, Gaylord sold the station to Gillett Communications (which made it a sister station of those Gillett acquired from KKR, most of which were stations owned by Storer Broadcasting). Gillett underwent a corporate restructuring in the early 1990s, changing its name to GCI Broadcast Services, Inc. In 1993, GCI filed for bankruptcy, and its stations (including WTVT) were sold to New World Communications. By that time, WTVT was preempting CBS This Morning for a locally produced morning newscast, as well as preempting all but one hour of the network's Saturday morning cartoons and aired the weeknight edition of the CBS Evening News on a half-hour tape delay at 7 p.m. WTVT did not carry the CBS daytime dramas Capitol or The Bold and the Beautiful and instead aired The Young and the Restless at 1 p.m. on a half-hour delay. This was due to the popularity of its one-hour midday newscast that dates back to the 1970s.

=== As a Fox station ===
On December 18, 1993, Fox outbid CBS for the rights to the NFL's National Football Conference television package beginning with the league's 1994 season. Most of Fox's affiliates at the time were on the UHF band; seeking to affiliate with VHF stations to complement the new rights, Fox signed a long-term deal with New World Communications on May 23, 1994, to affiliate with twelve of the company's major network affiliates, effective that fall.

WTVT affiliated with Fox on December 12, 1994, ending its 39-year affiliation with CBS. This resulted in a three-way affiliation swap that resulted in the market's previous Fox affiliate, WFTS-TV (channel 28), affiliating with ABC as part of a larger deal between the station's owner, the E. W. Scripps Company and ABC; longtime ABC affiliate WTSP (channel 10) replaced WTVT as the CBS affiliate. The final CBS program to air on WTVT was the made-for-TV movie Reunion, which began at 9 p.m. Eastern Time on December 11, 1994. With the switch, WTVT became the third Tampa area station to have been affiliated with Fox. WTOG (channel 44) was the market's original affiliate from the network's launch in October 1986 until the affiliation moved to WFTS in 1988. The station chose not to renew the more expensive syndicated programs that it had run as a CBS affiliate, and instead began acquiring cheaper first-run syndicated talk and reality shows.

Albeit with a three-month interruption due to CBS losing the National Football Conference (NFC) rights (the games instead aired on WFTS for the first three months of Fox's NFC telecasts as a lame duck affiliate), the switch allowed WTVT to retain its status as the "home" station for the Tampa Bay Buccaneers—a status it held since 1977, when the team moved to the NFC. Under the NFL's contract with Fox (and before it, CBS), WTVT normally airs most of the Bucs' games, including all road games against American Football Conference opponents. However, largely due to the Bucs' lack of success on the field for most of their first 20 years, the team's home games were almost always blacked out locally. This was especially true during the Bucs' darkest period in the 1980s and 1990s, when they had 12 consecutive 10-loss seasons; at one point, no Bucs home games were seen locally from 1982 to 1986—spanning portions of five seasons. Once the Buccaneers began to build a winning team in the late 1990s, along with a new look and the opening of Raymond James Stadium, local television blackouts decreased, thus allowing more games to be shown on WTVT. The blackout rules were lifted by the NFL in 2015 on an experimental basis, and have since been suspended indefinitely, meaning games are now shown on Channel 13 regardless of attendance.

News Corporation bought New World outright in July 1996; the purchase was finalized on January 22, 1997, making WTVT the first owned-and-operated station of a major network in the Tampa Bay area. Shortly after the purchase was announced, the station changed its branding from "Channel 13" to "Fox 13"—retaining the numerical "13" logo it had used since 1989 as a CBS affiliate. Under Fox ownership, the station added more higher-profile syndicated shows and a few off-network sitcoms to its lineup.

In June 2009, WTVT interviewed late television pitchman Billy Mays shortly before his death. His interview, which was conducted at the Tampa International Airport, is believed to have been his final appearance on live television.

On December 14, 2017, The Walt Disney Company, owner of WFTS-TV's affiliated network ABC, announced its intent to buy WTVT's parent company, 21st Century Fox, for $66.1 billion; the sale, which closed on March 20, 2019, excluded WTVT and the other Fox Television Stations, as well as the Fox network, the MyNetworkTV programming service, Fox News, and Fox Sports 1, which were all transferred to the newly-formed Fox Corporation.

== News operation ==
WTVT presently broadcasts 72 1/2 hours of locally produced newscasts each week (with 12 hours each weekday, 6 1/2 hours on Saturdays and six hours on Sundays). In regards to the number of hours devoted to news programming, it is the highest local newscast output of any television station in both the Tampa Bay market and the entire state of Florida.

Under Gaylord Broadcasting ownership, the company poured significant resources into channel 13's news operation. In 1958, WTVT became the second station in the country to introduce daily editorials, and was also the first station in the country to run an hour-long news block, consisting of 45 minutes of local news (under the title Pulse) combined with the then-15-minute network newscast. By 1962, WTVT had overtaken WFLA-TV as the highest-rated station in the Tampa Bay market, retaining that position for over 25 years. This was largely because of the longevity of many of the station's personalities. For instance, Roy Leep was the station's weatherman from 1957 until his retirement on November 26, 1997, and Hugh Smith was the station's main anchor from 1963 to 1991, spending most of that time doubling as its news director.

Channel 13 dropped the Pulse moniker from its newscasts in 1989 in favor of Eyewitness News. The Eyewitness News moniker was retained during the early years of the Fox era before being dropped in 1997.

After WTVT became a Fox affiliate in December 1994, the station adopted a news-intensive schedule, increasing its news programming output from about 30 hours a week to nearly 45 hours. Like most former Big Three affiliates that joined Fox during the 1990s, it maintained a news schedule similar to the one it had as a CBS affiliate. The station retained all of its existing newscasts. However, it expanded its weekday morning newscast from one to 3 1/2 hours (with two hours added from 7 to 9 a.m. to make up for the loss of CBS This Morning), bridged the weeknight 5 and 6 p.m. newscasts into a two-hour early evening news block (by expanding its half-hour 6 p.m. newscast to one hour) and moved the 11 p.m. newscast to 10 p.m. and expanded it to a full hour (originally titled Channel 13 Eyewitness News Prime Time at Ten, later renamed as Fox 13 10:00 News upon Fox purchasing the station). On December 12, 2005, WTVT debuted a new 11 p.m. newscast called News Edge at 11:00, returning a newscast to that timeslot since the station was still affiliated with CBS. At one point, WTVT had the largest local newscast output of any television station in the country.

In April 2009, Fox entered into a Local News Service agreement with the E. W. Scripps Company in which Fox's owned-and-operated stations in Tampa, Detroit and Phoenix would share news video and helicopter footage with Scripps-owned stations in those markets for use in their own reports. Locally, WTVT began pooling video with WFTS as part of the agreement; however the stations otherwise maintain separate news departments. Gannett-owned WTSP was added to the LNS agreement that June. Prior to the agreement, WTVT had been the only station in the Tampa market to use two news helicopters: a Bell 206 called "SkyFox" and a Robinson R44 called "SkyFox 2", which was used whenever "SkyFox" was grounded due to mechanical reasons. When warranted, both helicopters were used to cover significant news stories. WTVT, WFTS and WTSP now utilize only one helicopter (WFTS' "Action Air One") to cover news events (rival station WFLA covers news events by utilizing its own helicopter, "Eagle 8").

In the summer of 2009, Fox Television Stations opened a graphics hub at the WTVT studios to distribute graphics for Fox's owned-and-operated stations.

Starting with the 5 p.m. newscast on June 30, 2009, WTVT became the fourth and final station in the Tampa Bay market to begin broadcasting its local newscasts in high definition.

=== Monsanto controversy ===
In 1997, Steve Wilson and Jane Akre began work on a story regarding the agricultural biotechnology company Monsanto and recombinant bovine growth hormone (rBGH), a milk additive that had been approved for use by the Food and Drug Administration but also blamed for a number of health issues. Wilson and Akre planned a four-part investigative report on Monsanto's use of rBGH, which prompted the company to write to Fox News Channel president Roger Ailes in an attempt to have the report reviewed for bias and because of the "enormous damage that can be done" as a result of the report.

WTVT did not run the story, and later argued in court that the report was not "breakthrough journalism". Wilson and Akre then claimed that the station's actions constituted the news broadcast telling lies, while WTVT countered looking only for fairness, and wanted to air a hard-hitting story with a number of statements critical of Monsanto. Wilson and Akre stated that they rewrote the report over 80 times over the course of 1997, and WTVT decided to exercise "its option to terminate their employment contracts without cause", and did not renew their contracts in 1998. WTVT later ran a report about Monsanto and rBGH in 1998, and the report included defenses from Monsanto.

After Wilson and Akre's contracts were not renewed, they filed a lawsuit concerning WTVT's "news distortion" under Florida's whistleblower laws, claiming their termination was retaliation for "resisting WTVT's attempts to distort or suppress the BGH story". In a joint statement, Wilson claimed that he and Akre "were repeatedly ordered to go forward and broadcast demonstrably inaccurate and dishonest versions of the story", and "were given those instructions after some very high-level corporate lobbying by Monsanto (the powerful drug company that makes the hormone) and also ... by members of Florida's dairy and grocery industries". The trial commenced in the summer of 2000 with a jury dismissing all of the claims brought to trial by Wilson, but siding with one aspect of Akre's complaint, awarding her $425,000 and agreeing that Akre was a whistleblower because she believed there were violations of the Communications Act of 1934 and because she planned on reporting the station to the Federal Communications Commission. Reason magazine, referring to the case, noted that Akre's argument in the trial was that Akre and Wilson believed news distortion occurred, but that they did not have to prove this was the case.

An appeal was filed, and a ruling in February 2003 came down in favor of WTVT, who successfully argued that the FCC policy against falsification was not a "law, rule, or regulation", and so the whistle-blower law did not qualify as the required "law, rule, or regulation" under section 448.102.... Because the FCC's news distortion policy is not a "law, rule, or regulation" under section 448.102, Akre has failed to state a claim under the whistle-blower's statute." The appeal did not address any falsification claims, noting that "as a threshold matter... Akre failed to state a claim under the whistle-blower's statute", but noted that the lower court ruled against all of Wilson's charges and all of Akre's claims with the exception of the whistleblower claim that was overturned.

=== Current on-air staff ===
- Paul Dellegatto (AMS Certified Broadcast Meteorologist Seal of Approval) – chief meteorologist; weeknights
- Mark Wilson – weeknight 6 and 10 p.m. anchor

=== Notable former on-air staff ===
- Jane Akre – investigative reporter and anchor
- Sharyl Attkisson – reporter (1988–1992; later at CBS News until 2014, now hosts Full Measure at Sinclair Broadcast Group)
- Colin Cowherd – weekend sports anchor (1994–1996; now at Fox Sports Radio)
- Tom Dunn – anchor/reporter (1962–1964; deceased)
- Liz Brunner – anchor/reporter (1987–1992); later with WCVB-TV in Boston
- Don Harris – reporter (1964–1968; later with NBC News, murdered in Jonestown in 1978)
- Jack Harris – afternoon host, Pulse Plus (1984–1989; later at WFLA-TV, was most recently at Newsradio WFLA)
- Tom Martino – reporter (1980s; moved to KDVR)
- Kerry Sanders – reporter (1986–1991; later with NBC News, now retired)
- Hugh Smith – anchor (1963–1991; deceased)
- Steve Wilson – investigative reporter (later at WXYZ in Detroit, now runs an investigative reporting service)
- Jessica Yellin – reporter (1999–2001; now at CNN)
- Tony Zappone – news correspondent (1965 and 1976–1982)

== Technical information ==
=== Subchannels ===
The station's signal is multiplexed:

Subchannels of WTVT
Subchannel	Res.	Short name	Programming
13.1	720p	WTVT-DT	Fox
13.2	480i	MOVIES!	Movies!
13.3	480i	Buzzr	Buzzr (4:3)
13.4	480i	HEROES	Heroes & Icons
13.5	480i	NOSEY	Nosey
13.6	480i	FOX WX	Fox Weather
32.3	480i	Estrell	Estrella TV (WMOR-TV)

Broadcast on behalf of another station

=== Analog-to-digital conversion ===
WTVT shut down its analog signal, over VHF channel 13, on June 12, 2009, as part of the federally mandated transition from analog to digital television. The station's digital signal remained on its pre-transition VHF channel 12, using virtual channel 13.
