= Reverse compensation =

Financial practice in American television

Reverse compensation, in United States broadcasting, is the practice of a commercial television station paying a television network in exchange for being permitted to affiliate with that network. The word "reverse" refers to the historical practice of networks paying stations to compensate them for the airtime networks use to run network advertisements during their programming.

While the earliest example of reverse compensation can be traced to WPBF and its affiliation with ABC, mass utilization of the method appeared in the 1990s, with The WB Television Network receiving reverse compensation from several stations. In 2001, San Jose, California station KNTV agreed to pay $362 million over ten years to become the NBC affiliate for the Bay Area market, the largest such agreement to date. Shortly after, NBC bought KNTV when the station's owner ran into financial difficulty.

The practice played a role in the 2006 affiliation drives of two newly announced networks, The CW Television Network and MyNetworkTV. The CW reportedly demanded reverse compensation from affiliates for an arguably proven, but still low-rated, prime time schedule; MyNetworkTV made no such demand and also allowed stations to keep more ad time than a traditional network would. As a result, several stations that seemed to be good candidates to become CW affiliates, including most WB- and UPN-affiliated Sinclair Broadcast Group stations, announced affiliations with MyNetworkTV instead, though in cases where Sinclair had market duopolies, eventually relented and affiliated the second stations with The CW before their launch. Pappas Telecasting and Tribune Company, the two major station groups which did carry The CW, both filed for bankruptcy protection in 2008. Tribune, which operated the largest group of CW affiliates at the time of the network's launch, removed the network name from its stations' branding for a few years, until management changes returned the network branding to most of their affiliates.

In Canada, CTV attempted to move from a traditional network affiliation contract to a reverse compensation model in the early 2000s, which played a role in the disaffiliation of CHAN-TV in Vancouver, British Columbia and CJON-TV in St. John's, Newfoundland and Labrador from the network.
