= Mass media in Jacksonville, Florida =

Jacksonville, Florida, is served by local media, as well as regional and national media. As of 2024, Jacksonville is ranked as the 41st largest television media market in the United States, with 840,340 homes. Radio and television broadcasts are governed by the FCC.

== Print media ==
The Florida Times-Union is the major daily newspaper in Jacksonville. Jacksonville.com is its official website. It is owned by USA Today Co., which also publishes the Georgia Times-Union for southeast Georgia residents. Financial News & Daily Record is another daily paper focused on the business and legal communities. The Jacksonville Business Journal is a weekly American City Business Journals publication focused on business news. Folio Weekly is the city's largest alternative weekly. The Florida Star is the city's oldest African-American focused paper. Jacksonville Free Press is another weekly catering to the black community. Metro Jacksonville is an online publication.

=== Daily ===
- The Florida Times-Union
- Financial News & Daily Record

=== Weekly ===
- Jacksonville Business Journal
- Jacksonville Free Press
- The Florida Star

=== Monthly ===
- BUZZ Magazine
- Folio 2.0
- Jacksonville Magazine
- EU Jacksonville
- Void Magazine

| Publication Name | Publisher | Distribution |
|---|---|---|
| Arbus Magazine | Arbus | Bi-monthly |
| Coastal Today Magazine | Coastal Today Media, LLC | Quarterly |
| The Coastal | The Coastal Jacksonville LLC | Quarterly |
| The Resident Community News | The Resident Community News Group, Inc. | Two Monthly Newspapers, 60,000/mo. |
| Circles-Social Datebook & Charity Register | The Resident Community News Group, Inc. | Annual Charity Magazine, 10,000 in Print |
| Historic Life | The Resident Community News Group, Inc. | Annual Newcomers Guide, 10,000 in Print |
| Powerful Partners | The Resident Community News Group, Inc. | Annual Advertorial Magazine, 10,000 in Print |

== Television ==
Jacksonville is the 42nd largest local television market in the United States, and is served by television stations affiliated with all the major American networks. The Jacksonville television market serves Northeastern Florida and Southeastern Georgia.

=== Full-power ===
- 4 WJXT Jacksonville (Independent)
- 7 WJCT Jacksonville (PBS)
- 12 WTLV Jacksonville (NBC)
- 17 WCWJ Jacksonville (The CW)
- 21 WPXC-TV Brunswick, GA (Ion Television)**
- 25 WJXX Orange Park (ABC)
- 30 WFOX-TV Jacksonville (Fox)
- 47 WJAX-TV Jacksonville (CBS)
- 59 WJEB-TV Jacksonville (TBN)**

=== Low-power ===
- 9 WJKF-CD Jacksonville (Story Television)
- 10 WJXE-LD Jacksonville
- 18 WUJX-LD Jacksonville (Quiero TV)
- 20 WKBJ-LD Live Oak
- 22 WQXT-CD St. Augustine
- 23 WJVF-LD Jacksonville
- 26 WDVW-LD Jacksonville
- 27 WWRJ-LD Jacksonville
- 29 WUBF-LD Jacksonville
- 33 WUJF-LD Jacksonville (Daystar)
- 34 WODH-LD Jacksonville
- 35 WRCZ-LD Jacksonville
- 39 W30EE-D Jacksonville (HSN)
- 43 WBXJ-CD Jacksonville (Mariavision)
- 48 WJGV-CD Palatka (Religious independent)
- 50 W32EZ-D Jacksonville

== Radio ==
Jacksonville is the 48th largest local radio market in the United States.

=== FM ===
- 88.1 WCRJ Jacksonville (Contemporary Christian music)
- 88.7 WJFR Jacksonville (Family Radio)
- 89.1 WUFT-FM Gainesville (Public radio and talk/NPR)
- 89.3 WECC-FM Folkston, GA (Contemporary Christian music)
- 89.9 WJCT-FM Jacksonville (Public radio and talk/NPR)
- 90.5 WYFB Gainesville (Bible Broadcasting Network)
- 90.0 WJKV Jacksonville (K-Love)
- 91.7 WTRJ-FM Orange Park (Contemporary Christian music)
- 92.1 WJXR Macclenny (Spanish Tropical)
- 92.5 WJXL-FM Jacksonville Beach (Sports-WJXL simulcast)
- 92.9 WNNR Jacksonville (Spanish Tropical)
- 93.3 WJBT Callahan (Urban contemporary)
- 94.1 WSOS-FM Fruit Cove (Spanish Tropical)
- 95.1 WAPE-FM Jacksonville (Contemporary history)
- 95.5 WSKR-LP Jacksonville (Adult album alternative)
- 96.1 WEJZ Jacksonville (Adult contemporary)
- 96.9 WJGL Jacksonville (Classic rock)
- 97.9 WKSL Neptune Beach (Contemporary hit radio)
- 99.1 WQIK-FM Jacksonville (Country)
- 99.9 WGNE-FM Middleburg (Country)
- 100.7 WMUV Brunswick, GA (Christian AC)
- 101.5 WSOL-FM Yulee (Classic hip-hop)
- 102.5 WYNR Waycross, GA (Country)
- 102.9 WEZI Jacksonville (Adult contemporary)
- 104.5 WOKV-FM Atlantic Beach (Talk radio)
- 105.3 WYKB Jacksonville (Country)
- 105.5 WBHU St. Augustine Beach (Adult hits)
- 105.7 WJGM Baldwin (Christian/Southern Gospel)
- 106.3 WKBX Kingsland, GA (Country)
- 106.5 WHJX Ponte Vedra Beach (Urban adult contemporary)
- 107.3 WPLA Green Cove Springs (Active rock)

=== AM ===
- 550 WAYR Fleming Island (Christian radio)
- 600 WBOB Jacksonville (Conservative talk)
- 690 WOKV Jacksonville (Sports/ESPN)
- 930 WFXJ Jacksonville (Sports/FSR)
- 970 WNNR Jacksonville (Spanish Tropical-WSOS-FM simulcast)
- 1010 WJXL Jacksonville Beach (Sports)
- 1050 WROS Jacksonville (Christian radio)
- 1160 WEWC Callahan (Tropical music)
- 1170 WSOS St. Augustine Beach (Tropical music)
- 1190 WPAA St. Marys, GA (Classic country)
- 1220 WKTZ Jacksonville (American Family Radio)
- 1240 WFOY St. Augustine (Talk radio)
- 1320 WJNJ Jacksonville (Tropical music-WJXR simulcast)
- 1360 WCGL Jacksonville (Urban gospel)
- 1400 WZAZ Jacksonville (Gospel)
- 1420 WAOC St. Augustine (Christian radio-WAYR simulcast)
- 1460 WQOP Jacksonville (Catholic/Relevant Radio)
- 1530 WYMM Jacksonville (Caribbean Music)
- 1570 WVOJ Fernandina Beach (Regional Mexican)
- 1600 WZNZ Atlantic Beach (Relevant Radio)

== See also ==
- Florida media
  - List of newspapers in Florida
  - List of radio stations in Florida
  - List of television stations in Florida
  - Media of cities in Florida
    - Fort Lauderdale, Gainesville, Key West, Lakeland, Miami, Orlando, St. Petersburg, Tallahassee, Tampa

== Bibliography ==
- Sean Devereux (1976). "Boosters in the newsroom: the Jacksonville case". Columbia Journalism Review. 14.
- Michael Ray Fitzgerald (2011). "Boss Jocks: How Corrupt Radio Practices Helped Make Jacksonville One of the Great Music Cities". Southern Cultures. 17. ISBN 9780807868423. ISSN 1068-8218.
