= Andy Johnson (politician) =

American politician (1953–2025)

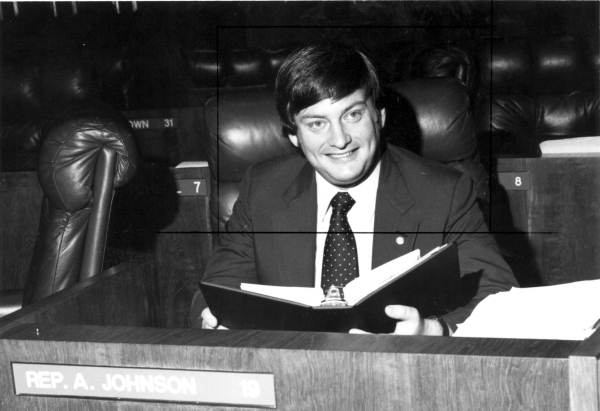
- Johnson in 1981

Member of the Florida House of Representatives from the 19th district
- In office 1979–1982
- Preceded by: Eric Smith
- Succeeded by: Bill Bankhead

Personal details
- Born: Andrew Earl Johnson; January 12, 1953 Jacksonville, Florida, U.S.
- Died: June 1, 2025 (aged 72) Jacksonville, Florida, U.S.
- Party: Democratic
- Spouse: Mary Davis (m. 1976)
- Children: 3
- Education: Dartmouth College

Andrew Earl Johnson Sr. (January 12, 1953 – June 1, 2025) was an American politician and talk radio host. A member of the Democratic Party, he served in the Florida House of Representatives from 1979 to 1982 in the District 19 seat.

Born in Jacksonville, Florida, Johnson graduated from Dartmouth College and managed his family's dairy farm before winning election to the Florida House of Representatives in 1978. He became the youngest member of the Florida House upon taking office. After being re-elected in 1980, Johnson ran for the Florida Senate in 1982 but lost; this was the first of several unsuccessful political candidacies through 1990. After leaving politics, Johnson hosted a talk show Down to Business on several Jacksonville radio stations.

== Early life and education ==
Born in Jacksonville, Florida, Andrew Earl Johnson graduated from Dartmouth College in 1975 with a B.A. At Dartmouth, Johnson was a member of the Young Democrats. In 1985, Johnson completed a J.D. at the University of Florida College of Law. After college, Johnson began managing his family's dairy farm, earning Outstanding Young Farmer of the Year in 1976. Also in 1976, Johnson joined the executive committee of the Duval County Democratic Party.

== Political career ==
Johnson won his first election in 1978 to the Florida House of Representatives, also becoming the youngest member of the House. In his first term, fellow House members recalled Johnson to be a "talented speaker" who "appealed to his constituents."

A staunch opponent of capital punishment, Johnson was a witness at the 1979 execution of John Spenkelink in the electric chair at Florida State Prison. Spenkelink was the second person to be executed, and first against his will, after the Supreme Court of the United States reinstated capital punishment with its 1976 ruling Gregg v. Georgia and companion cases Proffitt v. Florida and Jurek v. Texas.

He was re-elected in 1980. However, during his second term, Johnson began to be disliked among other House members, as a Florida Times-Union profile reported in 2000: "Johnson's in-your-face style annoyed some of his colleagues. By his second term, even Johnson admits he was out of favor with many of the senior legislators."

== Later career ==
Johnson became a perennial candidate in the 1980s with several election losses, first for Florida Senate in 1982. Then in 1986, he attempted a comeback to the Florida House but lost by 0.2 percent. He lost a Jacksonville City Council runoff election by nearly the same margin in 1987. Also in the 1980s, Johnson worked as a realtor and land developer. Beginning in 1989, Johnson began hosting a brokered time talk show, Down to Business. The show has been described as "populist", mixing social liberalism and fiscal conservatism.

In 1992, Johnson unsuccessfully ran in a U.S. House Democratic primary in Florida's 3rd congressional district against Corrine Brown, who would eventually win election. That would be the last time Johnson ran for office. By 2000, the Florida Times-Union described Johnson's reputation as "a political has-been who had much potential but who no longer is capable of being anything for the city except a disruption."

Down to Business changed stations several times, first from WVOJ to WOBS in 1998, then to WJGR in 2000. After WJGR was purchased by Salem Media Group, Down to Business moved from WJGR to WSVE in 2003. Then in 2004, the show changed stations to WNNR before returning to WJGR in 2006 and moving again to WZNZ in 2007.

By 2008, Johnson had become operations manager at WZNZ and changed its format to progressive talk radio, with The Ed Schultz Show as lead-in to Down to Business. Later that year, Down to Business and WZNZ's other progressive programming moved to FM station WHJX. Johnson's show moved again to WJSJ around 2010 and WZNZ in 2013.

== Personal life and death ==
Johnson married Mary Davis in 1976; they had three children. While in office, Johnson was a member of the Episcopal Church.

Johnson died on June 1, 2025, at the age of 72, after having had progressive supranuclear palsy for many years.
