= Kevin Metheny =

American radio executive (1954–2014)

- Born: June 6, 1954; United States
- Died: October 3, 2014 (aged 60)
- Occupation: Media executive

Kevin Metheny (June 6, 1954 – October 3, 2014) was an American radio and cable network executive who began his career as on-air talent and went on to direct programming and audience research at many radio stations and in a number of broadcast conglomerates. During the 1980s, Metheny helped develop cable entertainment networks MTV and VH1 as vice-president in charge of Music Programming and Production; he later served as vice-president of VH1 before returning to broadcast radio. Metheny received fame for his reputation as the nemesis of Howard Stern, earning him the nickname "Pig Virus."

== Career ==
Metheny became weekend air talent at album rock KWHP-FM in Edmond, Oklahoma, in 1970. The next year, he moved to WKY in Oklahoma City, serving as weekend and fill-in talent during his senior year at John Marshall High School. Pat O'Day, general manager of KJR/KISW-FM, hired Metheny as evening talent at KJR. Following O'Day's 1975 departure, Metheny left KJR and became afternoon drive talent/music director at WNOE-FM, New Orleans, where he was promoted to program director. He next served as program director of KDEO in El Cajon, California, changing the AM album rock station to Top-40 KMJC, also known as "Magic 91".

Metheny became director of radio audience measurement (RAM) research for DPS/Cyberdynamics, working closely with its initial RAM client Fairbanks Broadcasting's Adult Contemporary WIBG in Philadelphia. He accepted the position of program director at WIBG (later known as WZZD, now WNTP). He went on to be named program director of Hearst Corporation's Top-40 WXKX, Pittsburgh, then of WEFM in Chicago, followed by KSLQ-FM in St. Louis.

Metheny was named program director of The National Broadcasting Company's WNBC (NYC) in 1980. Around 1984, he accepted a position at Warner Amex Satellite Entertainment Company as Director of MTV Programming. Metheny led a management team secretly developing VH1 as a response to a challenge to MTV by Ted Turner's Cable Music Channel. He was subsequently promoted to vice-president of MTV/VH1 Music Programming and Production, and then to vice-president of VH1. After MTV Networks was acquired by Viacom in 1986, Metheny became program director of KTKS (Dallas). He subsequently moved to Savannah as vice president and general manager at WSOK/WAEV-FM. He accepted the operations director position of Bedford Broadcasting's San Francisco Oldies and Adult Standards stations KFRC-AM-FM followed by Oldies KQQL (Minneapolis).

Metheny then moved to Jacksonville, Florida, where he combined programming and marketing operations of WQIK-FM and News/Talk WJGR with newly acquired Urban properties WSOL-FM, WJBT, and WZAZ. This followed the deregulation of the broadcast industry by the FCC, allowing for unlimited national ownership and larger local station portfolios.

Metheny was transferred to head programming for Jacor Communications' Cleveland area radio group, consolidating operations at their combined six Cleveland stations, WAKS, WGAR-FM, WMJI, WMMS, WMVX, and WTAM. Following Jacor's merger with Clear Channel Communications Metheny was promoted to regional vice president of programming, in which role he advised local Market Managers and Program Directors of 59 Ohio radio stations.

Simultaneously with the 2008 acquisition of Clear Channel Communications, Inc. by Bain Capital and Thomas H. Lee Partners, Metheny left Clear Channel to become program director of the Tribune Company's sole radio property, News/Talk WGN, where he stayed until November 2010. In January 2013, he was named program director at WJR (Detroit). In June 2014, Metheny was named operations manager at San Francisco stations KGO and KSFO owned by Cumulus Media, a position he held until his death of an apparent heart attack on October 3, 2014. He was 60 years old and was survived by two daughters.

== Portrayal in Private Parts ==
Metheny and various other radio program directors associated with radio personality and comedian Howard Stern were portrayed as a composite character named Kenny "Pig Vomit" Rushton by Paul Giamatti in the 1997 movie Private Parts, based on Stern's autobiographical book of the same name. On his WNBC radio show, Stern regularly referred to Metheny as "Pig Virus".

== Personal life ==
Metheny attended Seattle University and Kent State University's Graduate School of Management.
