= Waia =

Waia may refer to:

- Waia language of Papua New Guinea
- Waia, Sierra Leone, a place in the Koinadugu District of Sierra Leone
- Waia, Kenya, a settlement in the Mbooni Constituency of Kenya

WAIA may refer to:

- WAIA (AM), a radio station (1600 AM) formerly licensed to Beaver Dam, Kentucky, United States, which held the call sign from 2001 to 2012
- WAIA (FM), a radio station (104.7 FM) licensed to Athens, Georgia, United States
- WJBT, a radio station (93.3 FM) licensed to Callahan, Florida, United States, which held the call sign WAIA from 1990 to 1995
- WSOS (AM), a radio station (1170 AM) licensed to St. Augustine Beach, Florida, which held the call sign WAIA from 1986 to 1990
- WFLC, a radio station (97.3 FM) licensed to Miami, Florida, which held the call sign WAIA from 1971 to 1986

== See also ==
- WAOA-FM, a radio station (107.1 FM) licensed to Melbourne, Florida, which uses the visually similar branding "WA1A"
- Waya (disambiguation)
