= WPLA =

WPLA may refer to:

- WPLA, Working Party on Land Administration of the United Nations Economic Commission for Europe
- WPLA (FM), a radio station (107.3 FM) licensed to serve Green Cove Springs, Florida, United States
- WKVL (FM), a radio station (104.9 FM) licensed to serve La Follette, Tennessee, United States, which held the call sign WPLA from 2021 to 2023
- WLGR, a radio station (93.5 FM) licensed to serve Warrensburg, New York, United States, which held the call sign WPLA in 2021
- WSLP, a radio station (93.3 FM) licensed to serve Ray Brook, New York, which held the call sign WPLA from 2020 to 2021
- WWFK, a radio station (107.1 FM) licensed to serve Dannemora, New York, which held the call sign WPLA from 2018 to 2020
- WMYF (Portsmouth, New Hampshire), a defunct radio station (1380 AM), which held the call sign WPLA from 2016 to 2017
- WMGE (AM), a radio station (1670 AM) licensed to serve Dry Branch, Georgia, United States, which held the call sign WPLA from 2010 to 2016
- WJBT, a radio station (93.3 FM) licensed to serve Callahan, Florida, United States, which held the call sign WPLA from 1995 to 2005
- WTWD, a radio station (910 AM) licensed to serve Plant City, Florida, United States, which held the call sign WPLA from 1949 to 1990
- WPLA, the Wool Products Labeling Act, enacted in 1939
