= WAYR =

WAYR may refer to:

- WAYR (AM), a radio station (550 AM) licensed to Fleming Island, Florida, United States
- WAYR-FM, a radio station (90.7 FM) licensed to Brunswick, Georgia, United States
