= WJGR =

WJGR may refer to:

- WJGR-LP, a low-power radio station (97.1 FM) licensed to serve Mobile, Alabama, United States
- WJNJ, a radio station (1320 AM) licensed to serve Jacksonville, Florida, United States, which held the call sign WJGR from 1994 to 2007
- WYMM, a radio station (1530 AM) licensed to serve Jacksonville, Florida, which held the call sign WJGR from 1987 to 1989
