= Skip Kelly =

American voice actor (born 1973)

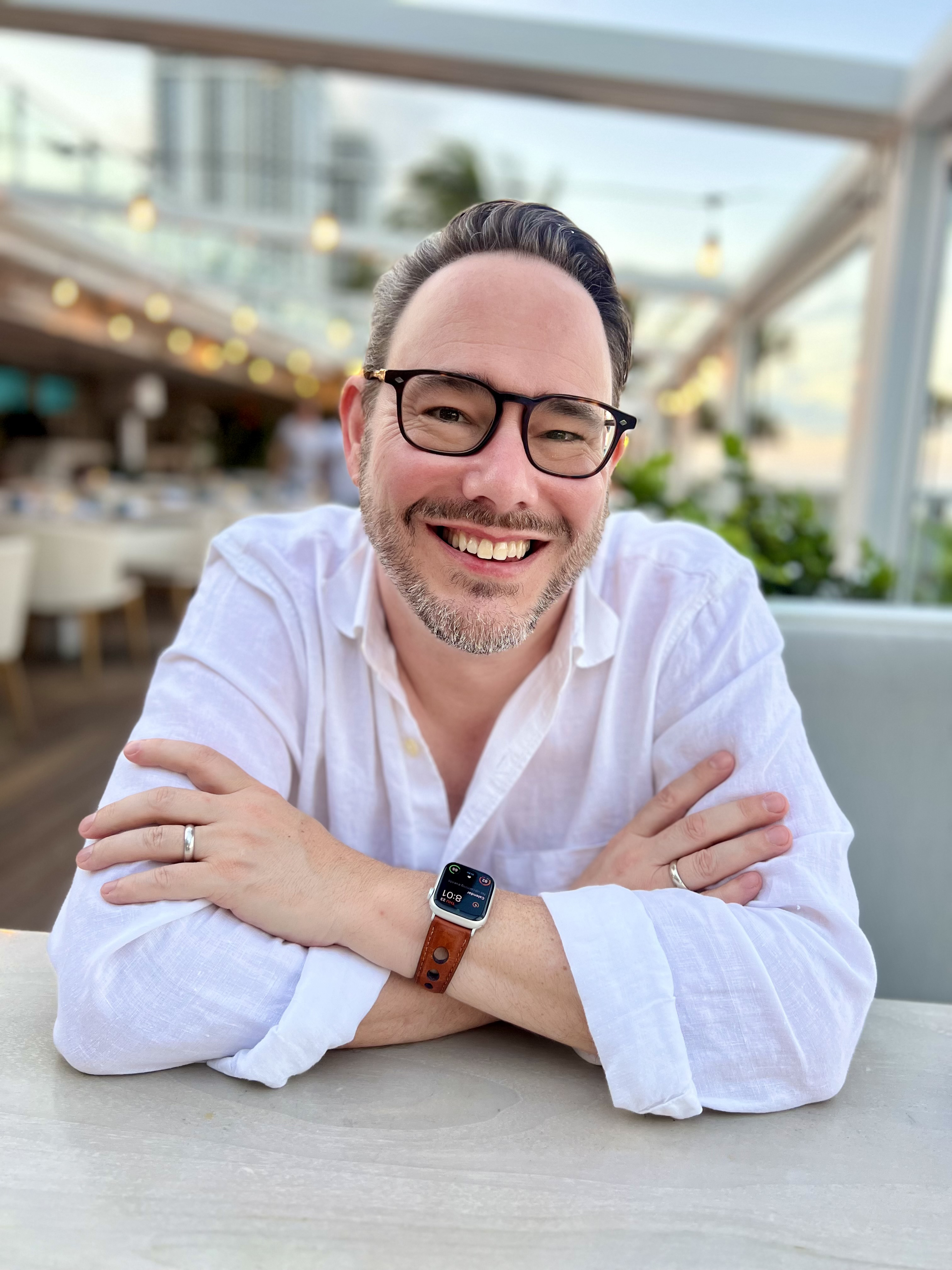
- Kelly in 2024
- Born: April 7, 1973 (age 53); New Hampshire, United States
- Presenting career
- Stations: KIIS, KYSR, WXKS, WPXY, WWJK, WKSL, WQIK, WZOU, WAAF
- Country: United States
- Website: skipkellyvo.com, skipk.com

Skip Kelly is a professional voice actor, audio producer, and American former radio personality known for his voiceover work and radio shows around the US. He was notably the voice of the Riddler in a series of Batman motion comics for DC Comics. His voice has been heard in videogames, and commercially for brands and products like Amazon, Disney, Foster Farms, Harvard Business School, Beaches Resorts, The Canada Post, Dell Technologies, La-Z-Boy, Honeywell, Gorton's Seafood, and DeWalt. Prior to focusing on voice acting, he spent over 30 years in the radio and television broadcast industry. Throughout his radio career, he shared the same mic as well-known personalities Ryan Seacrest, Danny Bonaduce, Delilah, Matt Siegel, and Dale Dorman. He also produced live music from Dave Matthews, Coldplay, Dido and Sarah McLachlan. Skip has appeared in Billboard Magazine and Teen People (magazine).

In 2001 Kelly hosted "The Movie Loft" for WSBK-TV, one of the first "hosted movie" franchises on television long before it became a staple on cable. During that time he was a regular movie review contributor for the Boston edition of the Metro International Newspaper. He has also been a contributor to both MTV and Entertainment Tonight providing interview footage with stars like Ricky Martin, Nelly Furtado, Lionel Richie, and others.

Since 2004, Kelly has been based out of his studio in Jacksonville, Florida. He originally came to Jacksonville in 2004 from Los Angeles to serve as Program Director for WFKS-FM, 97.9 KISS FM. In the past, he has worked for stations such as KIIS-FM and KYSR Los Angeles, KISS 108 Boston, 98PXY, Rochester, WQIK-FM, and 107.3 The River (formerly JACK fm) Jacksonville, WAAF and WZOU Boston.
