= Pig virus =

Pig virus can refer to:

== People ==
Kevin Metheny - a radio executive famously named "Pig Vomit" by Howard Stern

== General ==
Influenza A virus subtype H1N1 - a satirical name for the H1N1 influenza virus
