= WATY =

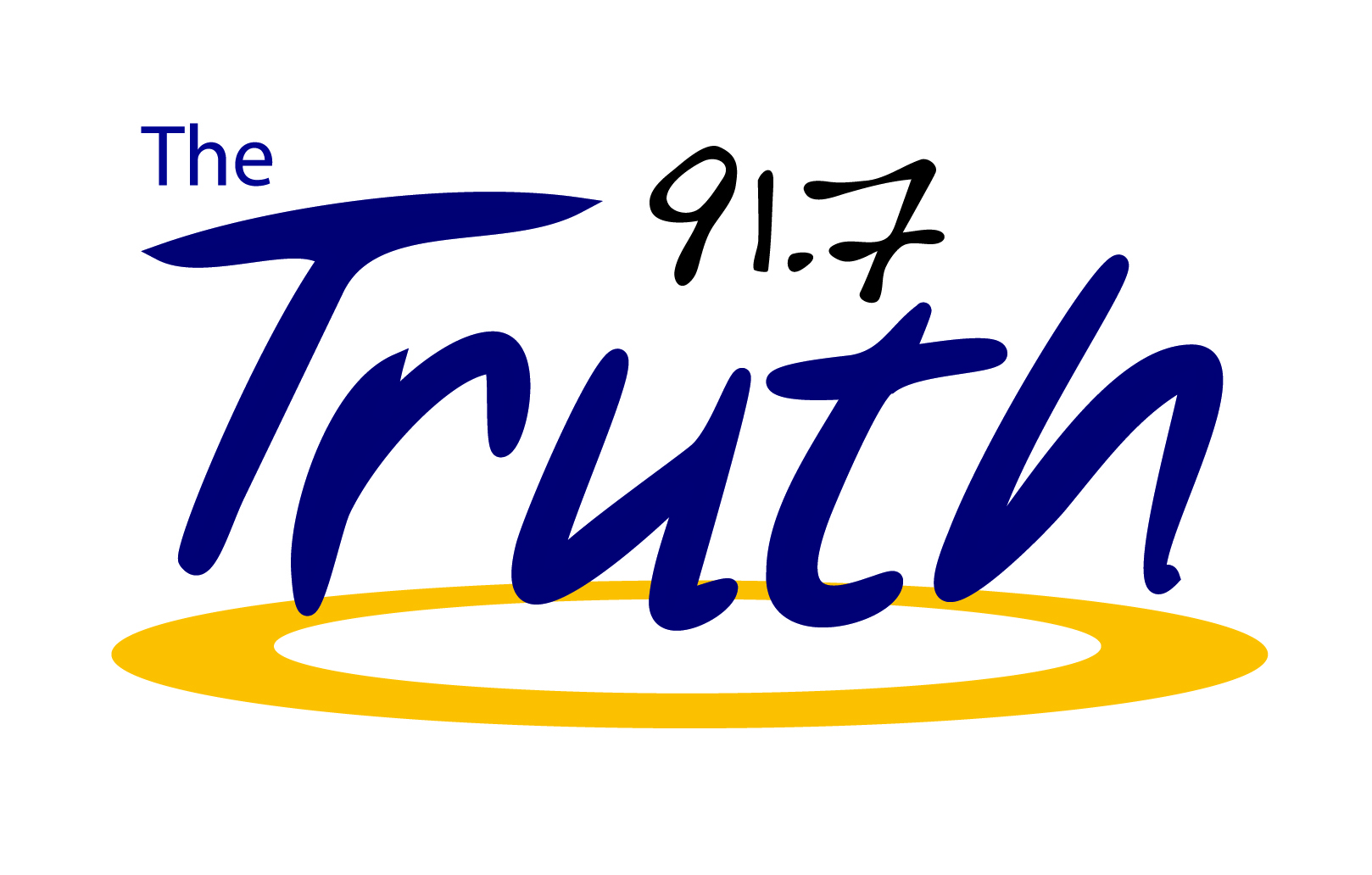
- Folkston, Georgia; United States
- Broadcast area: Southeastern Georgia, Northern Jacksonville metropolitan area
- Frequency: 91.3 MHz
- Branding: The Truth

Programming
- Format: Christian talk and teaching
- Affiliations: Salem Radio Network

Ownership
- Owner: Delmarva Educational Association
- Sister stations: WAYL, WTRJ-FM

History
- First air date: 2000

Technical information
- Licensing authority: FCC
- Facility ID: 83543
- Class: A
- ERP: 3,800 watts
- HAAT: 150.9 meters (495 ft)
- Transmitter coordinates: 30°52′29.00″N 82°1′10.00″W

Links
- Public license information: Public file; LMS
- Webcast: Listen Live
- Website: ILoveTheTruth.com

WATY (91.3 MHz) is an FM radio station licensed to Folkston, Georgia. The station is currently owned by Delmarva Educational Association and airs a Christian talk and teaching radio format using the moniker "The Truth." It is simulcast on 91.7 WTRJ-FM in Orange Park, Florida and 91.9 WAYL in St. Augustine, Florida. WTRJ covers the City of Jacksonville and its adjacent communities, while WAYL covers the southern part of the Jacksonville metropolitan area and WATY covers the northern section. Programming is also broadcast on WAYL's two translator stations in Jacksonville (94.3 MHz) and Atlantic Beach, Florida (103.7 MHz).

The Truth carries a schedule of national religious leaders, including David Jeremiah, Charles Stanley, John MacArthur, Jim Daly and Chuck Swindoll. Hosts may seek donations during their programs. Some programming is supplied by the Salem Radio Network.

== History ==
WATY signed on the air in 2000. It was owned by Okefenokee Educational Foundation, Inc. WATY aired informational and educational programming, along with adult standards music.

In the mid-2010s, WATY was sold to The Foundation For Public Broadcasting In Georgia. It began carrying the news and information programming of Georgia Public Radio as a network affiliate of NPR, with some classical music heard late nights and weekends.

Effective August 31, 2015, WATY was sold to Delmarva Educational Association, at a purchase price of $45,000. Delmarva made it one station in a trimulcast, helping cover the northern suburbs of the Jacksonville metropolitan area, airing Christian talk and teaching programs.
