= WAYL =

Radio station in St. Augustine, Florida

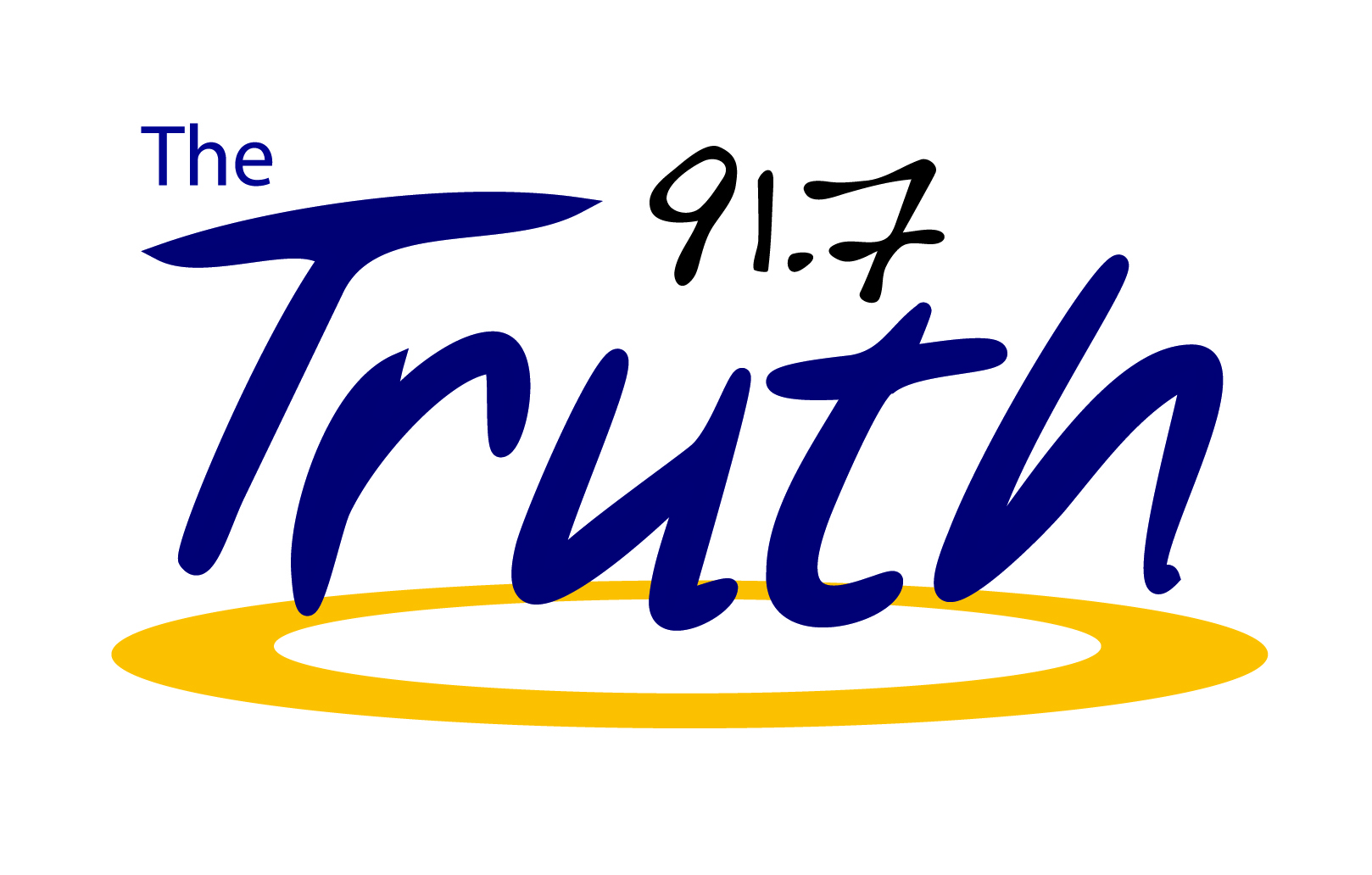
- St. Augustine, Florida; United States
- Frequency: 91.9 MHz
- Branding: 91.9 The Truth

Programming
- Format: Christian talk and teaching
- Affiliations: Salem Radio Network

Ownership
- Owner: Delmarva Educational Association
- Sister stations: WATY, WTRJ-FM

History
- Call sign meaning: WAY of Life 92 (former branding)

Technical information
- Licensing authority: FCC
- Facility ID: 49963
- Class: A
- ERP: 5,000 watts
- HAAT: 63 meters (207 ft)
- Transmitter coordinates: 29°51′0.00″N 81°19′50.00″W

Links
- Public license information: Public file; LMS
- Website: ILoveTheTruth.com

WAYL (91.9 MHz) is an FM radio station licensed to St. Augustine, Florida. The station is currently owned by Delmarva Educational Association and airs a Christian talk and teaching radio format using the moniker "The Truth." It is simulcast on 91.7 WTRJ-FM in Orange Park, Florida and 91.3 WATY in Folkston, Georgia. WTRJ covers the City of Jacksonville and its adjacent communities, while WAYL covers the southern part of the Jacksonville metropolitan area and WATY covers the northern section. Programming is also broadcast on WAYL's two translator stations in Jacksonville (94.3 MHz) and Atlantic Beach, Florida (103.7 MHz).

The Truth carries a schedule of national religious leaders, including David Jeremiah, Charles Stanley, John MacArthur, Jim Daly and Chuck Swindoll. Hosts may seek donations during their programs. Some programming is supplied by the Salem Radio Network.

== Callsign history ==
The WAYL call sign has been used by other broadcasters in the past, including 93.7 FM (now KXXR) in Minneapolis-St. Paul, Minnesota, which programmed a beautiful music format popular in the 1960s and 70s. It often referred to itself as "The Beautiful WAYL," pronouncing the call letters as "whale." In 1961, Jack I. Moore built and managed WAYL FM, and produced the first FM stereo broadcast between Chicago and the West Coast, working under great pressure to get on the air in time for a major exhibition on November 16, 1961.

== Translators ==
Call sign	Frequency	City of license	FID	FCC info
W279AG	103.7 FM	Atlantic Beach, Florida	76224	LMS
