= WBWL =

WBWL may refer to:

- WBWL (FM), a radio station (101.7 FM) licensed to serve Lynn, Massachusetts, United States
- WBOB (AM), a radio station (600 AM) licensed to serve Jacksonville, Florida, United States, which held the call sign WBWL from 1996 to 2010
