= WTRJ-FM =

Radio station in Orange Park–Jacksonville, Florida

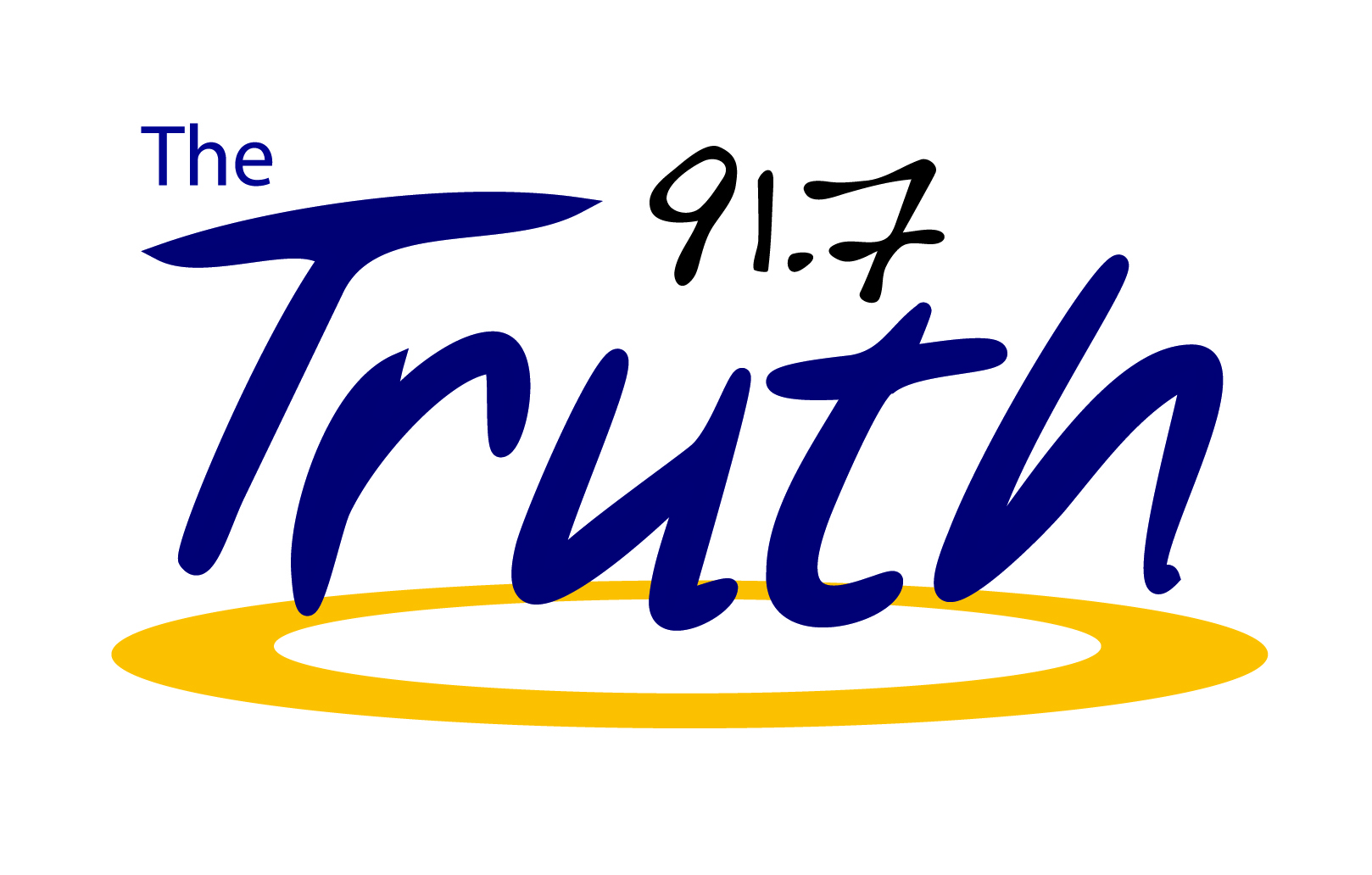
- Orange Park, Florida; United States
- Broadcast area: Jacksonville metropolitan area
- Frequency: 91.7 MHz
- Branding: The Truth

Programming
- Format: Christian talk and teaching
- Affiliations: Salem Radio Network

Ownership
- Owner: Delmarva Educational Association
- Sister stations: WAYL, WATY

History
- First air date: October 31, 1986
- Former call signs: WNLE (1984–2006); WJBC-FM (2006–2010)

Technical information
- Licensing authority: FCC
- Facility ID: 47425
- Class: C3
- ERP: 6,500 watts
- HAAT: 194 meters (636 ft)
- Transmitter coordinates: 30°37′23.00″N 81°31′49.00″W

Links
- Public license information: Public file; LMS
- Webcast: Listen Live
- Website: ILoveTheTruth.com

WTRJ-FM (91.7 MHz) is an FM radio station licensed to Orange Park, Florida. The station is currently owned by Delmarva Educational Association and airs a Christian talk and teaching radio format using the moniker "The Truth." It is simulcast on 91.9 WAYL in St. Augustine, Florida, and 91.3 WATY in Folkston, Georgia. WTRJ covers the City of Jacksonville and its adjacent communities, while WAYL covers the southern part of the Jacksonville metropolitan area and WATY covers the northern section. Programming is also broadcast on WAYL's two translator stations in Jacksonville (94.3 MHz) and Atlantic Beach, Florida (103.7 MHz).

The Truth carries a schedule of national religious leaders, including David Jeremiah, Charles Stanley, John MacArthur, Jim Daly and Chuck Swindoll. Hosts may seek donations during their programs. Some programming is supplied by the Salem Radio Network.

WTRJ's transmitter is off Hogan Road in Jacksonville. The studios and offices are also in Jacksonville, on Bonneval Road.

== History ==
The station signed on the air as WNLE on Halloween, October 31, 1986. It was owned by the Nassau Baptist College and was originally licensed to Fernandina Beach, Florida. On September 21, 2006, WNLE changed its call sign to WJBC-FM, and again on May 4, 2010, to WTRJ-FM.

Programming on WTRJ-FM originally was heard at 88.1 WCRJ. On May 1, 2011, it moved to 91.7 and 91.9 to better cover the Jacksonville radio market. 88.1 WCRJ is now airing Contemporary Christian music from "The Joy FM." In the early 2010s, WTRJ-FM switched its city of license from Fernandina Beach to Orange Park, although the transmitter and studios remain in Jacksonville.
