= WSOS-FM =

- Fruit Cove, Florida; United States
- Broadcast area: Jacksonville metropolitan area
- Frequency: 94.1 MHz
- Branding: Kaliente 94.1 & 97.3

Programming
- Format: Spanish tropical

Ownership
- Owner: Norsan Media
- Sister stations: WJXR, WYKB, WEWC, WVOJ, WNNR, WJNJ

History
- First air date: 1991 (as WSOS)
- Former call signs: WMKM (September 21, 1981-March 19, 1985, CP); WSOS (March 19, 1985-September 3, 2002)
- Former frequencies: 105.5 MHz

Technical information
- Licensing authority: FCC
- Facility ID: 74071
- Class: C3
- ERP: 5,500 watts
- HAAT: 154 meters (505 ft)
- Transmitter coordinates: 30°4′8″N 81°38′50″W
- Repeater: 970 WNNR (Jacksonville)

Links
- Public license information: Public file; LMS
- Website: kalientejax.com

WSOS-FM (94.1 MHz) is commercial radio station that broadcasts to the Jacksonville, Florida area. The station is licensed in Fruit Cove to Norsan Media. It airs a Spanish tropical format exclusive on WSOS-FM.

The signal covers the southern parts of the Jacksonville metropolitan area and the studios are in the Southside district of Jacksonville with the transmitter tower in Fruit Cove.

== History ==
WSOS-FM went on the air on 105.5 MHz as WMKM, licensed to St. Augustine, Florida. Its original construction permit was filed on August 10, 1981. WMKM changed callsigns on March 19, 1985 to WSOS, and on September 3, 2002, the station became WSOS-FM with the acquisition of WKLN (which took the WSOS callsign). By the time WSOS-FM was sold to Renda Broadcasting in 2005, it was running an adult contemporary format as "The Muuusic Station". Under Renda's ownership, the community of license was changed from St. Augustine to Fruit Cove, to better serve the Jacksonville market. The signal still originated in St. Augustine until March 9, 2011, when it switched formats from soft adult contemporary to classic rock. On April 5, 2016, WSOS-FM changed their format from a simulcast of contemporary Christian-formatted WMUV to a simulcast of talk-formatted WBOB. On May 23, 2018, WSOS-FM switched from the WBOB simulcast to a simulcast of classic country-formatted WYKB, branded as "Jax Country". In January 2020, Jax Country became exclusive to WSOS-FM.

On November 26, 2024, it was announced that Chesapeake-Portsmouth Broadcasting would be selling WSOS-FM to Norsan Media. As part of this deal, the Classic country format would permanently move to 100.3 W262AG and WMUV-HD2. This will make WSOS-FM the sixth station in the Jacksonville market to be owned by Norsan Media. In mid-December 2024, WSOS-FM flipped to Spanish tropical under the branding "Kaliente 94.1".
