= WROS =

- Jacksonville, Florida; United States
- Broadcast area: Jacksonville area
- Frequency: 1050 kHz

Programming
- Format: Christian radio

Ownership
- Owner: WROS, The Rose of Jacksonville, LLC

History
- First air date: 1955
- Former call signs: WQIK (1955–1975; 1978–1981); WCMG (1976–1978)

Technical information
- Licensing authority: FCC
- Facility ID: 66333
- Class: D
- Power: 5,000 watts day; 13 watts night
- Transmitter coordinates: 30°21′14″N 81°44′21″W

Links
- Public license information: Public file; LMS
- Website: www.wros.net

WROS (1050 kHz) is a commercial AM radio station broadcasting a Christian radio format. Licensed to Jacksonville, Florida, the station is owned by WROS, The Rose of Jacksonville, LLC. WROS airs national religious leaders such as Dr. David Jeremiah, John MacArthur, Jim Daly, Chuck Colson and Dr. Charles Stanley. Hosts pay for their time on the station and may ask for donations while on the air.

WROS transmits in the daytime with a power of 5,000 watts, but because AM 1050 is a clear channel frequency, WROS must greatly reduce power at night to 13 watts to avoid interfering with other stations.

== History ==
=== Beginnings as WQIK ===
A construction permit was applied for on November 6, 1953, which was awarded on May 19, 1954. The station went on the air in 1955 as WQIK under the ownership of Telerad, Inc. WQIK originally transmitted on 1280 kHz with 1,000 watts. On July 10, 1957, ownership of WQIK transferred to Rowland Broadcasting Company, Inc., which would own WQIK until 1980. WQIK spawned a sister station, WQIK-FM 99.1, in 1964. In 1967, WQIK changed frequencies to 1090 kHz with an increase in power to 50,000 watts daytime/10,000 watts during critical hours/16.9 watts nighttime (to protect WBAL). In 1975, an application was filed to reduce power to 10,000 watts.

=== WCMG, back to WQIK, and WQIK gets sold ===
WQIK changed callsigns to WCMG effective January 1, 1976. The station would change frequencies again with an application filed on December 16, 1977, to shift to 1050 kHz with 5,000 watts daytime-only. WCMG changed back to WQIK on November 3, 1978. WQIK was sold to Gary L. Acker, trading as Good News Broadcasting, effective May 5, 1980.

=== WROS ===
On May 6, 1980 the station changed its call sign to WROS.
