= Eric Smith (Florida politician) =

American politician

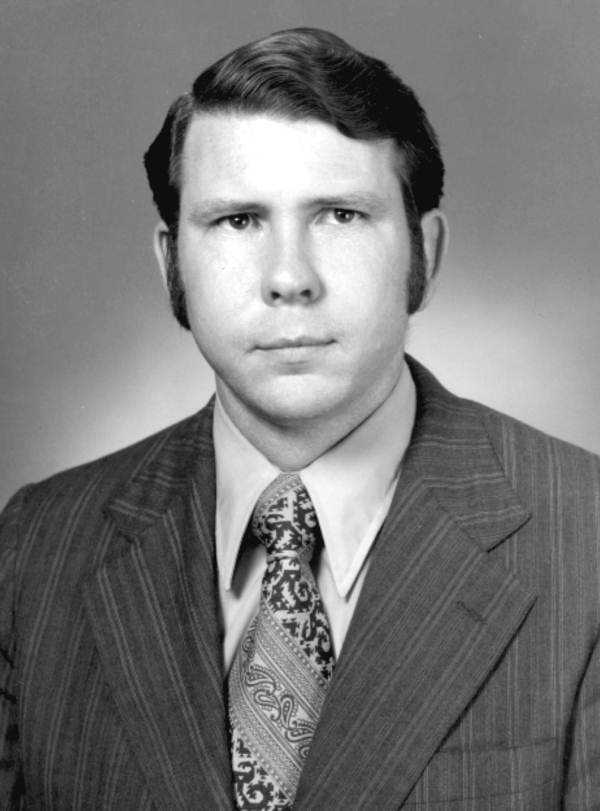

Member of the Florida House of Representatives for the 19th district
- In office 1973–1978
- Preceded by: Ted Alvarez Jr.
- Succeeded by: Andy Johnson

Personal details
- Born: September 11, 1942 (age 83) Miami, Florida, U.S.
- Party: Democratic
- Occupation: attorney

Eric B. Smith (born September 11, 1942) is an American former politician in the state of Florida.

Smith was born in Miami. He attended the University of Florida and earned a Juris Doctor in 1967. He served in the Florida House of Representatives from 1973 to 1978, as a Democrat, representing the 19th district.
