= WSOS (AM) =

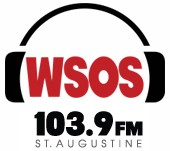
- St. Augustine Beach, Florida; United States
- Broadcast area: St. Augustine, Florida
- Frequency: 1170 kHz
- Branding: WSOS 103.9 FM

Programming
- Format: Classic hits

Ownership
- Owner: Kevin L. Geddings; (WSOS Radio LLC)

History
- First air date: October 15, 1986
- Former call signs: WAIA (1986–1990); WHWY (1990–1992); WKLN (1992–2003)
- Call sign meaning: Was the sister station of the original WSOS, now WSOS-FM

Technical information
- Licensing authority: FCC
- Facility ID: 70404
- Class: D
- Power: 710 watts day
- Transmitter coordinates: 29°55′5.00″N 81°23′26.00″W
- Translator: See § Translators

Links
- Public license information: Public file; LMS
- Webcast: Listen Live
- Website: staugustineradio.com

WSOS (1170 AM) is a radio station which is broadcasting a classic hits format. Licensed to St. Augustine Beach, Florida, United States, the station serves the St. Augustine area. The station also re-broadcasts on translator W280EY 103.9 FM (St. Augustine). The station is currently owned by Kevin Geddings through licensee WSOS Radio LLC of St. Augustine, Florida. WSOS AM 1170 is a daytime-only Class D station, broadcasting on the clear-channel frequency of 1170 kHz. WSOS must leave the air from sunset to sunrise to avoid interference with the nighttime skywave signal of WWVA (AM) in Wheeling, West Virginia.

== History ==
The station went on the air as WAIA on October 15, 1986. During the 1980s, it broadcast an adult contemporary format playing hits from the 1960s, 1970s and 1980s along with its sister-station WSOS-FM. On February 1, 1990, the station changed its call sign to WHWY, then it changed again on September 4, 1992, to WKLN & on February 18, 2003, to the current WSOS. WSOS was purchased by Kevin Geddings of St. Augustine, Florida in 2012. He immediately linked it to an FM signal. The station now simulcasts on 103.9 FM (St. Augustine) and 95.7 (Nocatee & Ponte Vedra). Geddings previously owned WFOY/WAOC St. Augustine as well as WXNC and WKMT in Charlotte, North Carolina. Previously Geddings worked for WSPA Spartanburg/Greenville, South Carolina and for RKO Radio in New York City.

== Translators ==
Broadcast translators for WSOS
Call sign	Frequency	City of license	FID	ERP (W)	HAAT	Class	Transmitter coordinates	FCC info
W239CN	95.7 FM	St. Augustine Beach, Florida	200389	250	99 m (325 ft)	D	30°6′14″N 81°28′11″W	LMS
W280EY	103.9 FM	St. Augustine, Florida	151917	240	114 m (374 ft)	D	29°55′5″N 81°23′26″W	LMS
