= Waya (disambiguation) =

Waya (1974–2001) was a French Thoroughbred racehorse.

Waya or WAYA may also refer to:

== People ==
- Lawrence Waya (born 1963), Malawi football player
- Mary Waya (born 1968), netball player and coach
- Manasseh Lomole Waya, South Sudanese politician

== Other uses ==
- Waya Island, an island in Fiji
- Waia language, of Papua New Guinea
- WAYA-FM, a Christian radio station in South Carolina, US
- WAYA, a former callsign of WQMT, a Spanish-language radio station in Tennessee, US

== See also ==
- Waia (disambiguation)
