= WQIK-FM =

- Jacksonville, Florida; United States
- Broadcast area: Jacksonville metropolitan area
- Frequency: 99.1 MHz (HD Radio)
- Branding: WQIK 99.1

Programming
- Format: Country
- Subchannels: HD2: Rumba 106.9 (Spanish contemporary)
- Affiliations: Premiere Networks

Ownership
- Owner: iHeartMedia, Inc.; (iHM Licenses, LLC)
- Sister stations: WFXJ (AM); WKSL; WJBT; WSOL-FM; WPLA

History
- First air date: September 1964

Technical information
- Licensing authority: FCC
- Facility ID: 29728
- Class: C0
- ERP: 100,000 watts
- HAAT: 302 meters (991 ft)
- Transmitter coordinates: 30°16′51″N 81°34′12″W
- Translator: HD2: 106.9 W295AZ (Jacksonville Beach)

Links
- Public license information: Public file; LMS
- Webcast: Listen live (via iHeartRadio); HD2: Listen live (via iHeartRadio)
- Website: 991wqik.iheart.com; HD2: rumba1069.iheart.com

WQIK-FM (99.1 MHz) is a commercial radio station in Jacksonville, Florida. The station is owned by iHeartMedia, Inc., and airs a country radio format. Overnight, WQIK carries the syndicated After MidNite with Granger Smith and the Bobby Bones Show on Sunday evenings. WQIK-FM is unusual in the radio industry as a station that has kept its original call sign and format for more than half a century.

The station's studios and offices are located on Central Parkway in Jacksonville's Southside section. The transmitter is off Hogan Road in the Arlington district. WQIK-FM is powered at 100,000 watts with a Class C signal. It broadcasts in the HD format, with the HD2 subchannel carrying the iHeartRadio Spanish contemporary format, also heard on translator station W295AZ, in Jacksonville Beach, called "Rumba 106.9."

== History ==
=== Early years ===
In September 1964, WQIK-FM first signed on. It was owned by Rowland Broadcasting Company, which also owned WQIK (1280 AM). Both stations simulcast a country music format. WQIK (AM) later moved to 1090 kHz, boosting its power to 50,000 watts, covering much of Northeast Florida, but having to sign-off at sunset. The FM allowed the station's country music to be heard around the clock for people with FM radios.

WQIK-FM started with 28,500 watts, broadcasting from a 340-foot (100 m) tower, so its coverage was limited to Jacksonville and its immediate suburbs. By 1970, power was boosted to 50,000 watts and several years later, it doubled to 100,000 watts,. The tower height was increased to 640 feet (200 m). The stations were affiliates of ABC Entertainment Radio.

=== WQIK (AM) ===
On January 1, 1976, the AM station switched call letters to WCMG, adopting a more personality-oriented classic country format, while WQIK-FM had a younger, more music-intensive format. WCMG was limited as a daytimer, unable to broadcast after sunset due to Class A station WBAL in Baltimore having nighttime rights to 1090 AM. WCMG changed back to WQIK on November 3, 1978, and was sold in 1980. The original WQIK (AM) became WROS. In 1982, Rowland Broadcasting acquired WVOJ (1320 AM), an AM station with full time rights to broadcast. That station eventually became WQIK (AM), once again airing a classic country format as a companion to WQIK-FM.

=== Sale to Jacor and Clear Channel ===
Previous logo

In June 1984, longtime owner Rowland Broadcasting sold WQIK-AM-FM to Jacor Communications for $4.95 million. WQIK (AM) was switched to WJGR, airing a talk radio format. WQIK-FM continued as the top country music station in Jacksonville.

In May 1999, Jacor Communications, including WQIK-FM, was acquired by Clear Channel Communications. In 2014, Clear Channel Communications was renamed iHeartMedia.

=== Country competition ===
WQIK-FM had the FM country audience in Jacksonville to itself until 1977, when competitor WCRJ-FM signed on. WQIK-FM usually topped WCRJ-FM (later WROO) in the ratings. WCRJ-FM/WROO is now mainstream rock-formatted WPLA, a sister station to WQIK-FM.

In 1996, WQIK-FM got a new competitor, when Top 40 outlet WFKS switched to a country music format as WGNE-FM. WGNE moved to a tower in Jacksonville to better cover the radio market. WQIK-FM has maintained its lead over WGNE in the Jacksonville ratings.

In 2017, WQIK-FM lost ground to WYKB, and later to WSOS-FM.
