= WFOY =

- St. Augustine, Florida; United States
- Broadcast area: St. Augustine, Florida
- Frequency: 1240 kHz
- Branding: Newstalk 102.1 FM WFOY

Programming
- Language: English
- Format: News/talk/sports
- Affiliations: Red Apple Media; Compass Media Networks; Premiere Network; Florida's News Networks; Westwood One; Florida Gators; Jacksonville Jaguars

Ownership
- Owner: Cook Broadcasting LLC; (Cook Broadcasting LLC)

History
- First air date: February 11, 1937
- Former frequencies: 1210 kHz (February 11, 1937-March 29, 1941)
- Call sign meaning: Fountain Of Youth (original owner)

Technical information
- Licensing authority: FCC
- Facility ID: 60271
- Class: C
- Power: 500 watts
- Transmitter coordinates: 29°51′1″N 81°19′49″W
- Translator: 102.1 W271CJ (St. Augustine)

Links
- Public license information: Public file; LMS
- Webcast: mixlr.com/wfoy
- Website: www.1021news.com

WFOY (1240 AM) is a radio station broadcasting a News/talk format. Licensed to St. Augustine, Florida, United States, the station is currently owned by Cook Broadcasting LLC. The station is repeated in St. Augustine on translator W271CJ (102.1 FM).

== History ==
Considered to be the oldest radio station in St. Augustine, WFOY signed on at 15:45 on Thursday, February 11, 1937 on 1210 kHz at a power of 100 watts, despite claims that the station started July 7, 1936 (more likely the 1936 date is when the construction permit was issued).

WFOY was originally owned by the operators of the Fountain of Youth park, where the station remained until March 12, 2003 (although the park and radio station parted owners). With the NARBA shift of 1941, WFOY shifted from 1210 to 1240 kHz (the new home of all stations formerly on 1210). Over the years WFOY gained power increases to 250 watts (first in the daytime only, then continuously) and then 1,000 watts (again, daytime only at first, then continuously). When WFOY vacated its property to move to the WAOC building, it had to reduce power to 580 watts to avoid interfering with WIYD/1260 in Palatka and other stations on or around 1240.

In August 1965, WFOY added FM service on 97.7 MHz, which was primarily a simulcast of WFOY. With Shull Broadcasting taking possession of WFOY & WFOY-FM in April 1984, the FM became WUVU "View 97.7 FM" with a rock format. WUVU was sold in 1992 when it increased power to 50 kW and shifted frequency to 97.9 MHz. Today, this station is WKSL "97.9 KISS FM" and is owned by iHeartMedia. FM service returned to the site in 1993 when Flagler College's WFCF/88.5 began broadcasting.

Shull Broadcasting bought competing AM station WAOC/1420 in 2002 and sold off WFOY's property at 1 Radio Road in St. Augustine to developers. WFOY moved its studios and transmitter to the WAOC building at 567 Lewis Point Road Extension from where WAOC, WAYL and WSJF transmit. WFCF moved to its own property where it was able to increase power to 10 kW (Class C3) up from the previously authorized 6 kW (full Class A). On July 1, 2006, the station began streaming on the Internet..

Also in 2006, an article appeared in the St. Augustine Record about Shull Broadcasting's sale of the station (along with WAOC) to Florida-based Phillips Broadcasting, a minority-owned broadcasting company owned by Kristine Phillips.

Former logo

On August 5, 2021, Phillips Broadcasting filed an application with the FCC to assign its authorization to operate WFOY and W271CJ to Local Matters Broadcasting.

One week later, on August 12, 2021, Phillips Broadcasting owner Kristine Phillips died after a long illness.

On December 2, 2021, radio industry publication AllAccess.com reported that Phillips Broadcasting closed on the sale of WFOY and W271CJ to Local Matters Broadcasting for $1,000. The sale was consummated on December 1.

On May 5, 2026 after FCC approval, Cook Broadcasting LLC principals Charlene K. Cook and James Dalton Vereault acquired WFOY and W271CJ from Local Matters Broadcasting.

=== Famous alumni ===
- Billy Graham (his sermons were aired on the station around 1938).
- Ray Charles (disc jockey/studio musician in the 1940s).

== Programming ==
WFOY had been an affiliate of CBS Radio from 1940 to 2006 and rejoined the network in 2012 until CBS ceased operations in June 2026. The station now broadcasts hourly news from Red Apple Networks, Worldwide News Network. The station currently broadcasts a news/talk format including Chris Plante, Joe Pags Jesse Kelly Kelly and other talk programming. WFOY is the radio home of the St. Augustine High School Yellow Jackets football team. WFOY is an affiliate of the radio network of the Jacksonville Jaguars of the National Football League.

== Translator ==
Broadcast translator for WFOY
Call sign	Frequency	City of license	FID	ERP (W)	HAAT	Class	Transmitter coordinates	FCC info	Notes
W271CJ	102.1 FM	St. Augustine, Florida	148291	250	132 m (433 ft)	D	29°51′1.9″N 81°19′48.3″W	LMS	Was briefly W272CT on 102.3 before becoming W271CJ on 102.1.

== See also ==
- 1937 in radio
