= WVOJ =

Simulcasts WEWC Callahan
- Fernandina Beach, Florida; United States
- Broadcast area: Jacksonville area
- Frequency: 1570 kHz
- Branding: La Raza 92.9 & 105.3

Programming
- Format: Regional Mexican

Ownership
- Owner: Norsan Media; (Norsan Consulting And Management, Inc.)
- Sister stations: WEWC, WJNJ, WJXR, WNNR, WSOS-FM, WYKB

History
- First air date: November 30, 1955 (as WFBF)
- Former call signs: WHOG (1981–1990); WQAI (1990–1998); WYHI (1998–1999); WGSR (1999–2004); WNNR (2004)
- Call sign meaning: W Voice Of Jacksonville

Technical information
- Licensing authority: FCC
- Facility ID: 49214
- Class: D
- Power: 10,000 watts day 30 watts night
- Transmitter coordinates: 30°40′33″N 81°27′35″W
- Translator: 92.3 W222CL (Fernandina Beach)

Links
- Public license information: Public file; LMS
- Website: larazajax.com

WVOJ (1570 AM) is a commercial radio station, licensed to Fernandina Beach, Florida, and serving the Jacksonville metropolitan area. The station is currently owned by Norsan Consulting And Management, Inc. WVOJ airs a Regional Mexican radio format, largely simulcast with several other radio stations in the Southern U. S., including North Carolina and South Carolina.

== Engineering data ==
WVOJ broadcasts with 10,000 watts by day, but because AM 1570 is a clear channel frequency, WVOJ must reduce its power at night to 30 watts to avoid interfering with other radio stations. 1570 kHz is a Mexican clear-channel frequency, on which XERF-AM in Ciudad Acuña is the dominant Class A station.

=== F.M. translator ===
Programming is also heard over FM translator W222CL on 92.3 MHz.

Broadcast translator for WVOJ
Call sign	Frequency	City of license	FID	ERP (W)	HAAT	Class	Transmitter coordinates	FCC info
W222CL	92.3 FM	Fernandina Beach, Florida	153363	250	0 m (0 ft)	D	30°40′33.8″N 81°27′34.3″W	LMS

=== Construction permit ===
Norsan Consulting has an application with the Federal Communications Commission to move the AM station's city of license to Orange Park, Florida, increase its daytime to 50,000 watts and its nighttime power to 10,000 watts, using a directional antenna. The application is for a Class B license; it is currently Class D.

== History ==
The station was first licensed on November 30, 1955. The station was assigned the call sign WHOG on July 9, 1981. On October 19, 1990, the station changed its callsign to WQAI; on January 30, 1998, to WYHI; again on June 25, 1999, to WGSR; on January 16, 2004, to WNNR; and finally 13 days later to the current WVOJ.

On January 11, 2017, WVOJ went silent. As of February 15, 2019 WVOJ is licensed and operating (FCC database).

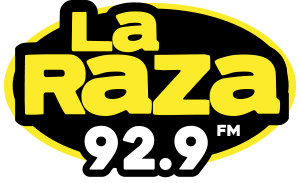
Previous logo
