= WJXR =

Coordinates: 30.299°N 82.015°W

- Macclenny, Florida; United States
- Broadcast area: Jacksonville metropolitan area
- Frequency: 92.1 MHz
- Branding: Latina 92.1 & 103.7

Programming
- Language: Spanish
- Format: Tropical music

Ownership
- Owner: Norberto Sanchez; (Norsan WJXR, LLC)
- Sister stations: WEWC, WJNJ, WNNR, WSOS-FM, WVOJ, WYKB

History
- First air date: September 1978
- Former call signs: WBKF (1978–1984)
- Call sign meaning: Jacksonville Radio

Technical information
- Licensing authority: FCC
- Facility ID: 73151
- Class: C3
- ERP: 25,000 watts
- HAAT: 100 meters (330 ft)
- Repeater: 1320 WJNJ (Jacksonville)

Links
- Public license information: Public file; LMS
- Webcast: Listen live
- Website: latinajax.com

WJXR (92.1 FM) is a commercial radio station licensed to Macclenny, Florida, United States, and serving the Jacksonville metropolitan area. The station is owned by Norberto Sanchez, through licensee Norsan WJXR, LLC. It airs a Spanish language tropical music format. WJXR's transmitter is sited in southwest Jacksonville, off U.S. Route 90.

== History ==
The station signed on the air in September 1978. Its original call sign was WBKF. It was owned by Woodrow W. Rhoden and it had studios at 336 West Macclenny Avenue in Macclenny. It aired a country music format and used the Associated Press for its news coverage. The station was Class A, powered at 3,000 watts, a fraction of its current output. In 1984, it switched its call letters to WJXR to represent "Jacksonville Radio".

The station's moniker was "Shark Country." The station logo was a shark dressed as a cowboy. WBKF had a mascot, a chihuahua named Delia Diamonique, which would appear at remote broadcasts.

In 1985, the station was bought by Sarah and Gregory Perch, calling their company WJXR, Incorporated. At first, it continued its country format, adding the ABC Directions Network for its news coverage. Perch was its general manager and program director. But then it began a new programming concept.

The bulk of the station's airtime was devoted to "The Bargain Channel" program, which consisted of broadcasting cut-rate prices on a wide variety of items. The show was similar to the "Trading Post"-type programs that was the genesis of cable shopping channels like the Home Shopping Network.

As The Bargain Channel its popularity rested, in part, on the personalities of the hosts and the matchless scope of the items being sold. For example, the Bargain Channel marketed large quantities of batteries, "miscellaneous" meats, tiger's eye men's rings, and burlap sacks. Many of the products on WJXR were sold in randomly matched packages, such as four packs of miscellaneous chicken combined with a 2-person vacation to either Disney World or Sea World Orlando for only $109. These packages are known as "deals". Callers will often purchase items by saying "I want two deals of batteries" or "can I get two deals of the pizza pans??"

The station's call letters were often used by hosts to greet callers. Due to their often Southern accents, hosts habitually pronounced the letters as the now-signature "Dubjexar?". Another popular caller greeting was "Welcome to the Bargain Channel," with "tothebarginchannel" slurred together in a humorous fashion.

On December 31, 2014 at 10:00 pm ET, the station flipped the format to Spanish tropical, simulcasting co-owned WEWC 1160 AM.

Previous logo
