= WMUV =

Radio station in Brunswick, Georgia, serving Jacksonville, Florida

Coordinates: 30.821°N 81.737°W

- Brunswick, Georgia; United States
- Broadcast area: Jacksonville metropolitan area
- Frequency: 100.7 MHz (HD Radio)
- Branding: The Promise

Programming
- Format: Christian AC
- Subchannels: HD2: Classic country "Jax Country 100.3"; HD3: Urban gospel "Praise 107.9"; HD4: Spanish Christian radio "La Verdad Jacksonville"

Ownership
- Owner: Nancy Epperson; (Chesapeake-Portsmouth Broadcasting Corporation)
- Sister stations: WBOB

History
- First air date: 1965; 61 years ago
- Former call signs: WIOI (1965–1991); WOKV-FM (1991–1993); WBYB (1993–1995); WWRD (1995–1996); WWRR (1996–2005); WKQL (2005–2006)
- Call sign meaning: Movin' (former format)

Technical information
- Licensing authority: FCC
- Facility ID: 48243
- Class: C0
- ERP: 62,000 watts
- HAAT: 449 meters
- Translators: 100.3 W262AG (Jacksonville, Florida, relays HD2); 107.9 W300CU (Jacksonville, Florida, relays HD3); 102.3 W272CQ (Jacksonville, Florida, relays HD4)

Links
- Public license information: Public file; LMS
- Webcast: Listen live HD2: Listen live HD3: Listen live
- Website: ilovethepromise.com HD2: jaxcountry.com HD3: praise1079.com

WMUV (100.7 FM) is a commercial Christian radio station licensed to Brunswick, Georgia, but it serves Jacksonville, Florida. The station is licensed to Chesapeake-Portsmouth Broadcasting Corporation and is owned by Nancy Epperson. It brands as 100.7 The Promise and broadcasts Christian adult contemporary music. Studios are on Bonneval Road in the Southside district of Jacksonville, and its transmitter tower is in Kingsland, Georgia.

== History ==
WMUV began targeting the Jacksonville area in 1965 as WIOI-FM. On June 3, 1991, it became WOKV-FM. The station later began airing Christian radio programming as WBYB (1993–1995), classic rock as both WWRD (1995–1996) and WWRR Arrow 100.7 (1996–2005), and oldies as WKQL Kool 100.7 (2005–2006). On October 20, 2006, WKQL became the eighth station in the United States to adopt the rhythmic hot AC MOViN' format and changed the call sign to WMUV.

On February 18, 2009, at 10 a.m., the rhythmic format was dropped and the station switched to classic country as Country Legends 100.7. On the morning of February 23, 2013, WMUV segued from classic country to mainstream country music, as Country 100.7. On April 18, 2013, WMUV rebranded as 100.7 The Bull and shifted its focus towards Southern Georgia. Although no longer an exclusively classic country station, the station still featured a heavy (largely 1990s) gold base to its playlist.

On January 3, 2015, after being acquired by Chesapeake-Portsmouth Broadcasting, WMUV and sister station WSOS-FM flipped to Christian AC as The Promise. On April 5, 2016, WSOS-FM flipped to a simulcast of WBOB Jacksonville.
