= The Florida Times-Union =

Daily newspaper in Jacksonville, Florida

- The 5 March 2007 front page of The Florida Times-Union
- Type: Daily newspaper
- Format: Broadsheet
- Owner: USA Today Co.
- Founders: J. K. Stickney; W. C. Morrill; Charles H. Jones
- Editor: Paul Runnestrand
- Founded: 1864; 162 years ago (as the Florida Union)
- Headquarters: 1 Independent Drive, Suite 200; Jacksonville, Florida 32202; US
- Circulation: 27,818
- ISSN: 0740-2325
- OCLC number: 49633482
- Website: jacksonville.com

The Florida Times-Union is a daily newspaper in Jacksonville, Florida, United States. Widely known as the oldest newspaper in the state, it began publication as the Florida Union in 1864. Its current incarnation started in 1883, when the Florida Union merged with another Jacksonville paper, the Florida Daily Times.

In 1983, Morris Communications of Augusta, Georgia, purchased Florida Publishing Company. The Times-Union became the largest newspaper of this chain, which owns a number of newspapers around the country. The paper is now owned by Gannett. Its editor is Paul Runnestrand.

== History ==
In 1864, during the American Civil War, J. K. Stickney and W. C. Morrill published the first edition of the Florida Union. It was a Northern and Republican paper, at the time when Jacksonville was occupied by the Union Army. By 1867, Stickney sold the Florida Union to Edward M. Cheney, of Boston. Cheney tried to make the paper into a daily publication but lacked the needed money. The Union was sold to Walton, Fowle & Co. in 1873. Stockholder C. F. Mawbey assumed control and turned the Union into a daily publication. Cheney returned to the Union as an editor.

In 1876, the Union was in decline and abandoned daily publication. Financially doomed, it was sold to H. B. McCallum, who then returned it to daily publication and converted it from an afternoon to a morning paper. Charles H. Jones wanted to buy the Union but was refused by McCallum. Annoyed, Jones started a rival paper, the Florida Daily Times, in November 1881. By 1883, the Daily Times was dominating the Union. McCallum became ill and finally decided to sell the paper to the Daily Times. The Union then combined with the Daily Times to form The Florida Times-Union, whose first edition was published on February 4, 1883.

The paper was partisan and worked to promote railroad interests. The Daily Times was reporting on election related violence in 1882.

On February 11, 2018, The Florida Times-Union printed its last papers in Jacksonville after 154 years. The Florida Times-Union newspapers are now printed at The Gainesville Sun and The Daytona Beach News-Journal, which are both owned by Gatehouse Media. On April 1, 2019, The Florida Times-Union moved to the Wells Fargo building at 1 Independent Drive, Suite 200 in downtown Jacksonville.

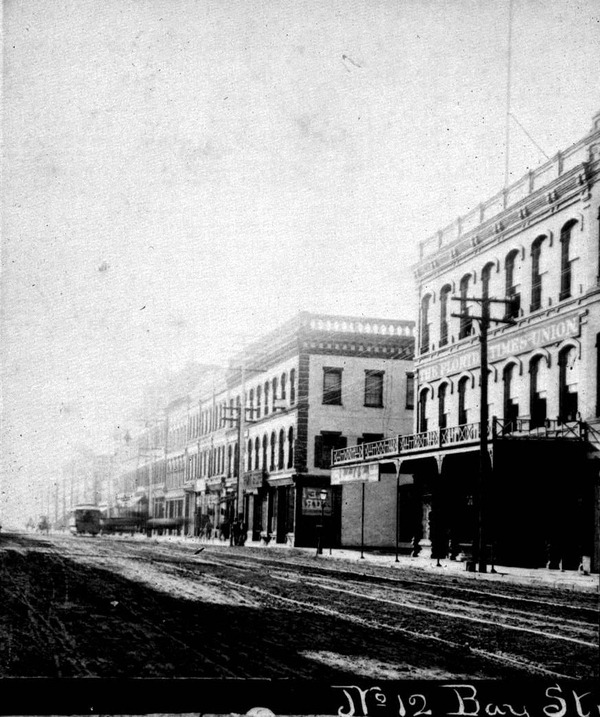
The Florida Times-Union (far right) in the 1880s

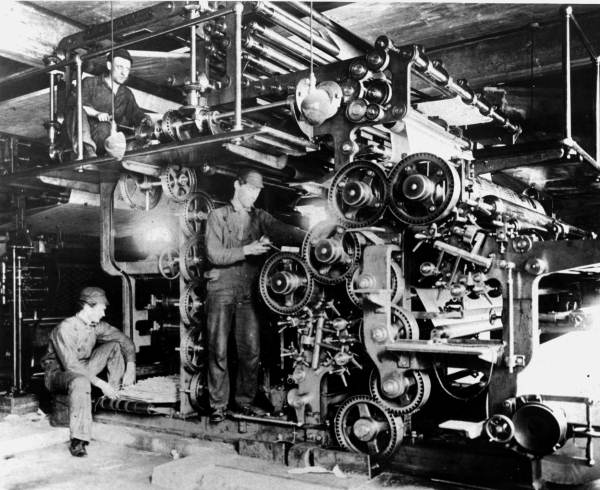
The pressroom in 1911

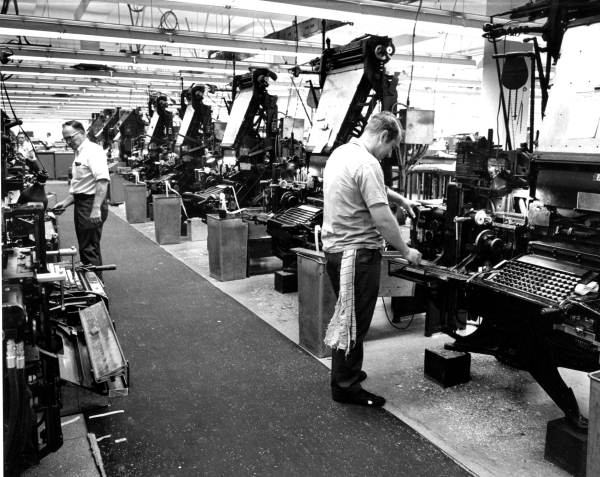
The Florida Times Union employees using linotype machines in 1972

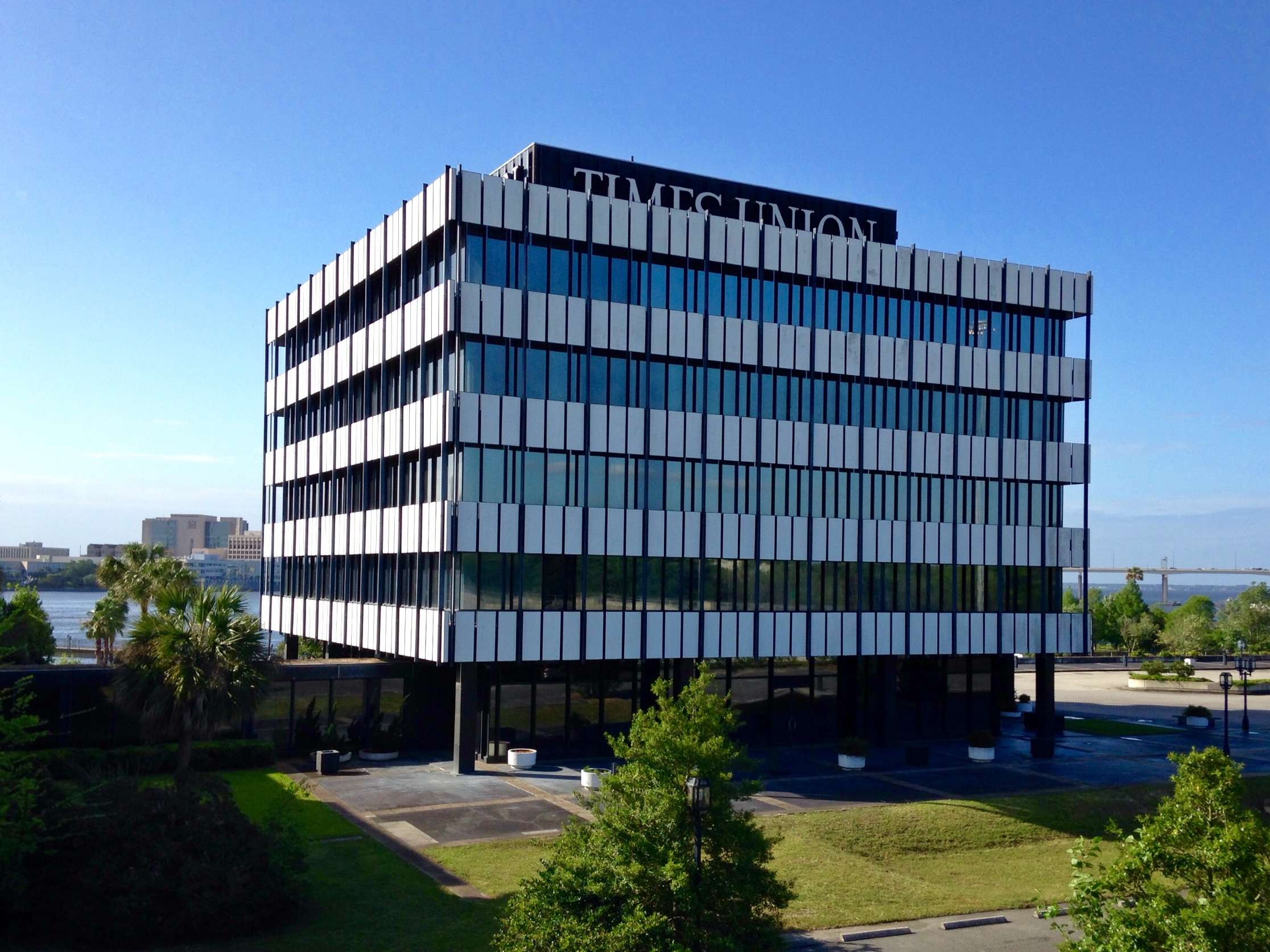
The offices of The Florida Times-Union from 1967 to 2019

== Ownership ==
For most of the 20th century, The Florida Times-Union was owned by the Florida Publishing Company, which was in turn jointly owned by the Atlantic Coast Line Railroad, the Florida East Coast Railway, and the Seaboard Air Line Railway, the three main railroads serving Jacksonville, having been acquired in equal shares by them or their corporate predecessors about 1896. The Coast Line and the Seaboard merged in 1967 as the Seaboard Coast Line, which evolved into CSX Transportation; the Florida East Coast has maintained its corporate identity into the 21st century. Both railroads have their headquarters in Jacksonville, the railroad hub of the state.

In 1983 Morris Communications of Augusta, Georgia, acquired the Florida Publishing Company for $200 million. In October 2017 Gatehouse Media acquired the Times-Union from Morris Communications, in conjunction with numerous other papers across the country, for $120 million. GateHouse merged with Gannett in 2019; while GateHouse was the nominal survivor, the merged company took the better-known Gannett name.

== See also ==
- Jacksonville Journal
- Media in Jacksonville, Florida
- List of newspapers in Florida
