= WJNJ =

Simulcasting WJXR Macclenny
- Jacksonville, Florida; United States
- Broadcast area: Jacksonville metropolitan area
- Frequency: 1320 kHz
- Branding: Latina 92.1 & 103.7

Programming
- Language: Spanish
- Format: Adult contemporary

Ownership
- Owner: Norsan Media; (Norsan Media and Consulting, Inc.)
- Sister stations: WEWC; WJXR; WNNR; WSOS-FM; WVOJ; WYKB

History
- First air date: July 15, 1940
- Former call signs: WJHP (1940–1957); WZOK (1957–1968); WVOJ (1968–1984); WQIK (1984–1994); WJGR (1994–2007); WBOB (2007–2010)
- Former frequencies: 1290 kHz (1940–1942)

Technical information
- Licensing authority: FCC
- Facility ID: 29736
- Class: D
- Power: 16,000 watts day; 80 watts night
- Transmitter coordinates: 30°19′43.86″N 81°41′41.35″W
- Translators: 92.7 W224EF (Orange Park); 103.7 W279AG (Atlantic Beach)
- Repeater: 105.3 WYKB-HD2 (Fernandina Beach)

Links
- Public license information: Public file; LMS
- Website: www.latinajax.com

WJNJ (1320 AM) is a broadcast radio station in the United States. Licensed to Jacksonville, Florida and owned by Norsan Media, WJNJ has a Spanish-language adult contemporary format simulcasting FM station WJXR.

The station first signed on in 1940 as WJHP and had a variety of call signs and formats in its history. Its heyday was as country music station WVOJ from 1968 to 1984; WVOJ had strong local ratings in the 1970s. In 1984, Jacor purchased WVOJ and changed its call sign to WQIK.

Over 50 years as a music station ended in 1994, with changes of the call sign to WJGR and format to news/talk/sports. Among WJGR's local programming were a talk show hosted by former State Representative Andy Johnson and Florida State University and University of North Florida basketball games. Throughout the 2000s, WJGR emphasized conservative talk shows, with ownership changes to Salem Media Group in 2004 and Chesapeake-Portsmouth Broadcasting in 2006 and then a new call sign WBOB in 2007.

In 2010, WBOB was purchased by a Jacksonville church, which changed its call sign to the present WJNJ and format to Christian talk and teaching. WJNJ was sold to Norsan Media in 2023, followed by a format change to Spanish music in 2024.

== History ==
=== As WJHP (1940–1957) ===
The station was first signed on the air on July 15, 1940, as WJHP on 1290 kHz. It was owned by The Metropolis Company and transmitted with a power output of 250 watts, and the call sign was derived from the initials of company president John H. Perry. WJHP was an NBC Blue Network and Associated Press affiliate. Following the NARBA treaty, WJHP obtained a construction permit for the 1320 kHz frequency in March 1941, and the license was officially modified for the station to broadcast on 1320 beginning November 6, 1942. WJHP increased its transmitting power to 5 kW in 1947.

The station was transferred to the Jacksonville Journal Company in 1952. In 1957, the Jacksonville Journal Company sold WJHP to Radio Jax for $225,000.

=== As WZOK (1957–1968) ===
In 1957, WJHP's call sign changed to WZOK. Part of the ABC Radio Network, WZOK had an easy listening format including jazz. Radio Jax sold WZOK in 1961 for $300,000, to the Peninsular Life Broadcasting, majority owned by the Peninsular Life Insurance Company.

=== As WVOJ (1968–1984) ===
On June 6, 1968, WJHP's call sign changed to WVOJ. Four days later, Victory Broadcasting (later Gulf United) closed a $350,000 purchase of the station and changed it to a country music format. Its slogan was "The Voice of Jacksonville". In February 1976, WVOJ changed its national news affiliation from UPI to NBC.

WVOJ was a popular station for much of the 1970s. In the October/November 1970 Pulse ratings for Jacksonville, WVOJ led the 6 to 10 p.m. daypart. It ranked eighth in the spring 1976 Arbitron ratings with about 3,200 average listeners per 15 minutes and sixth in spring 1977 with 6,100 listeners.

In 1977, Victory Broadcasting transferred the WVOJ license to WVOJ Inc. In 1982, Gulf United sold WVOJ to Rowland Broadcasting for $600,000. Rowland changed WVOJ's network affiliation from NBC to CBS in 1983.

=== As WQIK (1984–1994) ===
WVOJ was purchased by Jacor on June 1, 1984, and changed its call sign to WQIK while keeping WVOJ's country format. WQIK also brought back the ABC network affiliation.

=== As WJGR (1994–2007) ===
On April 1, 1994, WQIK became WJGR. The format also changed to news/talk/sports. WJGR was branded "The Jaguar", based on the upcoming NFL expansion team. Its sports programming included the Atlanta Braves Radio Network in 1994, but WJGR dropped the Braves after one season due to the high cost of media rights.

WJGR added The Ron and Ron Show to morning drive in January 1995 after WAIA removed the show from its schedule.

In 1996, WJGR began carrying ESPN Radio in evenings. WJGR and other Jacor stations changed ownership to Clear Channel Communications in 1998, following a merger of Jacor and Clear Channel. With the slogan "talk radio with teeth" in 2000, WJGR had a show Down to Business hosted by former State Representative Andy Johnson in addition to syndicated talk, sports programming, and national news from ABC News Radio and CNN Headline News. WJGR also added University of North Florida men's basketball in 2000–01.

By 2002, WJGR had the brand "Source 1320 WJGR" and began simulcasting WTEV's TV newscasts.

Salem Media Group purchased WJGR in 2003. Rebranding as "1320 the Patriot", WJGR changed its schedule to include Salem's national network conservative talk programming such as The Hugh Hewitt Show. WJGR also began joined the Seminole Radio Network in 2003 for broadcasts of Florida State University men's basketball games.

=== As WBOB (2007–2010) ===
Salem sold WJGR and two other Jacksonville stations to Chesapeake-Portsmouth Broadcasting in 2006 for $2.8 million. From 2006 to 2007, WJGR again broadcast Andy Johnson's Down to Business talk show. Chesapeake-Portsmouth changed the station's call sign from WJGR to WBOB on March 1, 2007, nearly a month after increasing its daytime power to 50 kW. It also branded the station "Big Bob".

In June 2007, WBOB signed a three-year contract to carry Georgia Network broadcasts of University of Georgia football games.

Arbitron consistently ranked WBOB as the second lowest rated Jacksonville radio station from fall 2008 to summer 2009, with ratings from 0.6 (summer 2009) to 1.0 (winter 2008).

In March 2010, New Covenant Ministries, a church based in South Jacksonville, filed an application with the FCC to buy WBOB.

=== As WJNJ (2010–present) ===
WBOB became WJNJ on May 3, 2010, and New Covenant Ministries changed WJNJ's format to Christian talk and teaching in the summer of 2010 with brand "Pure Radio". WBOB's former programming moved to AM 1530 and then to AM 600 in 2010. By December 2010, WJNJ had a 0.0 rating.

Norsan Media purchased WJNJ from New Covenant Ministries for $700,000 in 2023, excluding the intellectual property of "Pure Radio". In March 2024, Norsan changed WJNJ's format to Spanish-language oldies focusing on romántica songs, with brand "Romance Jax"; WJNJ joined a cluster of other Spanish stations owned by Norsan. As of 2026, the station is branded as "Latina 92.1 and 103.7", due to its simulcast of FM station WJXR and describing its music as "lo mejor de los 80, 90 y hoy" indicating popular music from the 1980s to present.

== Technical information ==
Since 2021, WJNJ has broadcast with 16 kW by day and 80 Watts at night from a non-directional antenna in the Mixon Town neighborhood. From 1959 to 2021, WJNJ's transmitter was located on Ellis Road in southwest Jacksonville.

=== Translators ===
Call sign	Frequency	City of license	FID	ERP (W)	HAAT	Class	Transmitter coordinates	FCC info
W224EF	92.7 FM	Orange Park, Florida	202612	250	0 m (0 ft)	D	30°4′23.4″N 81°47′26″W	LMS
W279AG	103.7 FM	Atlantic Beach, Florida	76224	250	278 m (912 ft)	D	30°16′51.9″N 81°34′12.2″W	LMS
