= WFXJ (AM) =

- Jacksonville, Florida; United States
- Broadcast area: Jacksonville metropolitan area
- Frequency: 930 kHz
- Branding: Fox Sports Radio Jacksonville

Programming
- Format: Sports
- Affiliations: Fox Sports Radio; Jacksonville Jaguars Spanish Radio Network

Ownership
- Owner: iHeartMedia, Inc.; (iHM Licenses, LLC)
- Sister stations: WJBT; WKSL; WQIK-FM; WSOL-FM; WPLA

History
- First air date: November 1925
- Former call signs: WJAX (1925–1991); WNZS (1991–2001)
- Call sign meaning: "Fox Sports Jacksonville"

Technical information
- Licensing authority: FCC
- Facility ID: 51973
- Class: B
- Power: 5,000 watts
- Transmitter coordinates: 30°17′9.00″N 81°44′52.00″W
- Repeater: (97.9-2) WKSL-HD2 (Neptune Beach)

Links
- Public license information: Public file; LMS
- Webcast: Listen live (via iHeartRadio)
- Website: fsrjax.iheart.com

WFXJ (930 AM, "Fox Sports Radio Jacksonville") is a commercial radio station licensed to Jacksonville, Florida, United States. It airs a sports format and is owned by iHeartMedia, Inc. The studios are located on Central Parkway in Jacksonville's Southside neighborhood. Most programming is supplied by Fox Sports Radio; the station also carries the Jacksonville Jaguars' Spanish language broadcasts.

The transmitter is sited off Hyde Grove Avenue on Jacksonsonville's Westside. WFXJ is also streamed on the iHeartRadio app.

== History ==
WFXJ is the oldest radio station in Jacksonville. It signed on the air in November 1925. The original call sign was WJAX. During the 1930s, WJAX broadcast on 900 kHz at 1,000 watts. While most radio stations of its day were owned by department stores or newspapers, WJAX was owned by the City of Jacksonville. WJAX was an NBC Red Network affiliate. In 1941, with the enactment of the North American Regional Broadcasting Agreement (NARBA) WJAX moved to 930 kHz. It also got a boost to 5,000 watts.

Logo as "SportsRadio 930"

In the 1990s, the station was carrying a talk radio format, owned by Florida businessman Bud Paxson. It used the call sign WNZS (standing for "News") and carried world and national news from the NBC Radio Network. But as sports radio stations were gaining popularity around the country, WNZS switched to an all-sports format. Clear Channel Communications (original name of today's iHeartMedia) acquired WNZS in the late 1990s. Because Clear Channel has a financial interest in Fox Sports Radio, the station became a Fox Sports Radio affiliate. On March 16, 2001, the call sign was switched to WFXJ to reflect its affiliation.

In July 2015, WFXJ hired Seth Harp as its new Director of Programming and afternoon drive time host.

On September 5, 2018, WFXJ rebranded as "930 The Game".

On March 15, 2019, WFXJ began simulcasting on FM translator W247CF, and rebranded as "97.3 The Game". The FM translator switched to a Regional Mexican format in May 2020, leaving sports programming only on AM 930. Without the FM translator, WFXJ returned to the branding "930 The Game".

On January 22, 2021, WFXJ ended its sports format, flipping to urban gospel music as "Hallelujah 930". Just six months later, on July 26, 2021, WFXJ flipped to Spanish news/talk, branded as "Acción 97.3" (simulcast once again on translator W247CF).

On February 16, 2024, WFXJ returned to airing Fox Sports Radio programming.
