= WEWC =

- Callahan, Florida; United States
- Broadcast area: Jacksonville metropolitan area
- Frequency: 1160 kHz
- Branding: La Raza 92.9 & 105.3

Programming
- Format: Regional Mexican

Ownership
- Owner: Norsan Media; (Norsan Consulting And Management, Inc.)
- Sister stations: WJNJ, WJXR, WNNR, WSOS-FM, WVOJ, WYKB

History
- First air date: 1999 (as WELX)
- Former call signs: WELX (1988–2001)
- Call sign meaning: Edward Waters College

Technical information
- Licensing authority: FCC
- Facility ID: 11214
- Class: B
- Power: 5,000 watts day 250 watts night
- Transmitter coordinates: 30°22′28.00″N 81°44′28.00″W
- Translators: 92.9 W225BI (Stockade); 97.5 W248CT (Callahan)
- Repeaters: 1570 WVOJ (Fernandina Beach); 105.3 WYKB (Fernandina Beach)

Links
- Public license information: Public file; LMS
- Website: larazajax.com

WEWC (1160 AM) is a radio station in the United States. Licensed to Callahan, Florida, the station serves the First Coast with a regional Mexican music format and is owned by Norsan Consulting and Management, Inc.

== History of the 1160 frequency ==
=== As WELX (1988–2001) ===
Founded by Jane A. Filler, the station was first licensed as WELX on July 11, 1988. However, WELX first signed on in 1999 with a Spanish music and talk format, after being purchased by Spanish Broadcasting of America (later Circle Broadcasting) in 1993.

However, after Circle Broadcasting majority owner Nestor Miranda was convicted of money laundering, Circle requested permission for a distress sale of WELX.

=== As WEWC (2001–present) ===
On November 8, 2001, WELX changed its call sign to WEWC. WEWC had an urban contemporary format with R&B and gospel music. Additionally, WEWC broadcast Edward Waters College football and basketball games. In 2003, WEWC's format changed to Latino contemporary hits.

In 2007, Norsan Consulting and Management purchased WEWC from Circle Broadcasting for $650,000, and its format changed to tropical music. Norsan changed WEWC's format from tropical to regional Mexican in 2013 and the branding from "Latina 1160" to "La Raza".

== Previous WEWC stations ==
Prior to 2001, the WEWC call sign belonged to the on-campus radio station of Edward Waters College. A carrier current station limited to the Edward Waters campus, the original WEWC first broadcast on 640 kHz on July 1, 1986. The original WEWC included news, public affairs, jazz, and contemporary hits.

== Technical information ==
Licensed to Callahan, WEWC broadcasts from a transmitter in northwestern Jacksonville with a 5 kW daytime directional signal and 250 watts non-directional signal at night. WEWC has two FM translators, 97.5 W248CT in Callahan and 92.9 W225BI in Stockade. WEWC has also been simulcast on 1570 WVOJ in Fernandina Beach since 2016. In 1998, Edward Waters College changed the station frequency to 1640 kHz.
