= WNNR =

Simulcasts WSOS-FM Fruit Cove
- Jacksonville, Florida; United States
- Broadcast area: Jacksonville, Florida
- Frequency: 970 kHz
- Branding: Kaliente 94.1 & 97.3

Programming
- Format: Spanish tropical

Ownership
- Owner: Norsan Media; (Norsan Consulting And Management, Inc.)
- Sister stations: WEWC, WJNJ, WJXR, WSOS-FM, WVOJ, WYKB

History
- First air date: 1969 (as WOZN)
- Former call signs: WVOJ (1984–2004)
- Call sign meaning: "Winner" (from former sports format)

Technical information
- Licensing authority: FCC
- Facility ID: 71219
- Class: D
- Power: 1,000 watts day 164 watts night
- Transmitter coordinates: 30°23′8.00″N 81°40′4.00″W
- Translator: 97.3 W247CF (Orange Park)

Links
- Public license information: Public file; LMS
- Website: kalientejax.com

WNNR (970 AM) is a radio station broadcasting a Spanish tropical radio format. Licensed to Jacksonville, Florida, United States, the station is currently owned by Norsan Consulting And Management, Inc.

== FM translator ==
Programming is also heard on FM translator station 'W247CF' on 97.3 in Orange Park. The station's moniker uses the FM translator’s frequency, as Top 97.3.

Broadcast translator for WNNR
Call sign	Frequency	City of license	FID	ERP (W)	HAAT	Class	Transmitter coordinates	FCC info
W247CF	97.3 FM	Orange Park, Florida	139259	99	0 m (0 ft)	D	30°16′34.9″N 81°33′50.3″W	LMS

== History ==
The station went on the air as WOZN in 1969. Then changed to WVOJ on March 1, 1984. On January 29, 2004, the station changed its call sign to the current WNNR.

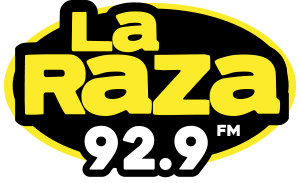
Previous logo
