= EU Jacksonville =

Monthly entertainment magazine

- Type: Monthly entertainment magazine
- Format: Tabloid
- Owner(s): Independent
- Publisher: Will Henley
- Founded: 1976
- Headquarters: Jacksonville, Florida
- Website: eujacksonville.com

EU Jacksonville is a monthly entertainment magazine published in Jacksonville, Florida. It contains feature reporting and entertainment and cultural guides for Jacksonville and the Northeast Florida region. It was recently acquired by Boldland Press, Inc. Attorney John Michael Phillips has been linked to the ownership group.

== History ==
The publication was founded as the Southeast Entertainer in 1976 by Jacksonville businessman and musician Tony Trotti. Originally an occasional publication, Trotti made it a weekly in the 1980s and changed the name to First Coast Entertainer, leaving his job as vice president of George Washington Life Insurance to work on the paper. In addition to covering Jacksonville's entertainment scene, the paper had a promotion arrangement with film companies to give out free movie tickets to readers.

Trotti died in 2003, and the Entertainer briefly stopped publication. Associate publisher Will Henley started a similar weekly called Entertaining U or EU Jacksonville, and then bought and absorbed the Entertainer, retaining most of its staff. EU underwent several format shifts and redesigns during the 2000s. In March 2008 it shifted to its present monthly tabloid format with expanded web offerings. The paper includes feature stories as well as reviews of films, music, entertainment and nightlife in the region.
