= WJGM =

- Baldwin, Florida; United States
- Broadcast area: Jacksonville metropolitan area
- Frequency: 105.7 MHz
- Branding: WJGM 105.7 The Gospel

Programming
- Format: Southern Gospel / Christian talk and teaching

Ownership
- Owner: West Jacksonville Baptist Church, Inc.

History
- First air date: July 30, 1992 (as WUFC)
- Former call signs: WUFC (1992–1992); WXQL (1992–2002); WHJX (2002–2011)
- Call sign meaning: Jacksonville's Gospel Music Station

Technical information
- Licensing authority: FCC
- Facility ID: 52032
- Class: C3
- ERP: 25,000 watts
- HAAT: 100 meters (328 ft)
- Transmitter coordinates: 30°22′40.00″N 82°1′48.00″W

Links
- Public license information: Public file; LMS
- Website: WJGMradio.com

WJGM (105.7 MHz) is a non-profit FM radio station licensed to Baldwin, Florida, and serving the Jacksonville metropolitan area. The station is currently owned by the West Jacksonville Baptist Church, Inc. Studios and offices are on Normandy Boulevard in Jacksonville. The transmitter is off Boyd Road in Bryceville, Florida.

WJGM airs a mix of Southern gospel music with some Christian talk and teaching programs on weekdays. It holds periodic fundraisers on the air to seek donations.

== History ==
The station went on the air as WUFC on July 30, 1992. It was owned by Peaches Broadcasting, Ltd. On October 16, 1992, the station changed its call sign to WXQL. In June 2011, the station was purchased by the West Jacksonville Baptist Church, and the call sign was changed to WJGM.
