= WPLA (FM) =

Green Cove Springs, Florida; United States
- Broadcast area: Greater Jacksonville
- Frequency: 107.3 MHz (HD Radio)
- Branding: 107.3 Planet Radio

Programming
- Format: Active rock
- Affiliations: Compass Media Networks; United Stations Radio Networks

Ownership
- Owner: iHeartMedia, Inc.; (iHM Licenses, LLC)
- Sister stations: WFXJ, WJBT, WKSL, WQIK-FM, WSOL-FM

History
- First air date: May 9, 1977 (as WJEE)
- Former call signs: WJEE (1975–1981); WCRJ-FM (1981–1991); WROO (1991–2005); WPLA (2005–2010); WJGH (2010–2012); WWJK (2012–2023)
- Call sign meaning: "Planet"

Technical information
- Licensing authority: FCC
- Facility ID: 51974
- Class: C1
- ERP: 98,000 watts
- HAAT: 302 meters (991 ft)
- Transmitter coordinates: 30°16′51″N 81°34′12″W

Links
- Public license information: Public file; LMS
- Webcast: Listen live (via iHeartRadio)
- Website: 1073planetradio.iheart.com

WPLA (107.3 MHz) is a commercial FM radio station licensed to Green Cove Springs, Florida, and serving the Greater Jacksonville radio market. The station broadcasts an active rock radio format and is owned by iHeartMedia, Inc.

WPLA's radio studios are on Belfort Parkway in Jacksonville's Southside neighborhood, and the transmitter is off Hogan Road in the Arlington section.

== History ==
The station signed on in May 1977 as beautiful music WJEE. In 1981, it switched to country music as WCRJ-FM. In 1991, the call sign changed to WROO as "Rooster Country".

On December 19, 2005, it became the new home for alternative rock station WPLA "Planet Radio". While WPLA saw its ratings rise after the frequency change, the station began losing ground when it had to split the alternative rock audience when 102.9 WXXJ (now WEZI) signed on in 2009.

On August 4, 2010, the station flipped to classic hits-formatted "Magic 107.3", competing primarily against WJGL. On October 13, 2010, WPLA changed its call sign to WJGH. Neal Sharpe was named program director and assumed the position on November 18, 2010.

On April 18, 2012, the station flipped to adult hits as "107.3 Jack FM" (later adopting the call sign WWJK to go with the new Jack-FM branding). In May 2013, program director Skip Kelly (formerly of WFKS, KIIS-FM, KYSR and WXKS-FM) was brought in.

On April 17, 2017, WWJK dropped the "Jack FM" brand and re-branded as "107.3 Jacksonville", with no change in format. The branding would be short-lived, as the station would re-brand again on May 26 as "107.3 The River".

On March 8, 2019, WWJK flipped back to rock as "107.3 Planet Radio", returning the brand and format to both WWJK and a full-power signal. The syndicated Lex and Terry morning show also returned to the station. On October 30, 2023, WWJK changed its call sign back to WPLA.
