= WAOC =

Radio station in St. Augustine–Jacksonville, Florida

- St. Augustine, Florida; United States
- Broadcast area: Jacksonville, Florida
- Frequency: 1420 kHz
- Branding: Way Radio

Programming
- Format: Christian Talk and Teaching (WAYR simulcast)

Ownership
- Owner: Good Tidings Trust, Inc.
- Sister stations: WAYR, WAYR-FM

History
- First air date: January 3, 1954
- Former call signs: WSTN (1954-1960s); WETH (1960s-1970)

Technical information
- Licensing authority: FCC
- Facility ID: 2706
- Class: B
- Power: 2,000 watts day 230 watts night
- Transmitter coordinates: 29°51′0″N 81°19′50″W
- Translator: 96.5 W243AW (Middleburg)

Links
- Public license information: Public file; LMS
- Website: wayradio.org

WAOC (1420 AM) is a radio station broadcasting a Christian talk and teaching format. Licensed to St. Augustine, Florida, United States, the station serves the Jacksonville area. The station is currently owned Good Tidings Trust, Inc.

== FM translator ==
WAOC programming is also relayed on an FM translator.

Broadcast translator for WAOC
Call sign	Frequency	City of license	FID	ERP (W)	Class	FCC info	Notes
W243AW	96.5 FM	Middleburg, Florida	146784	250	D	LMS	Phillips Broadcasting (owner)

== History ==
=== 1950s ===
==== 1954 ====
WAOC begins broadcasting as WSTN on January 3. It is initially a 1 kW daytimer.

=== 1970s ===
WAOC was operating in the early 1970s as WAOC (Americas Oldest City) and broadcasting from a single-wide mobile home situated at the transmitter site out in the woods off SR 207. Later in the mid-1970s, the studio moved to the second-highest floor in the National Bank building on Cathedral Place in downtown St. Augustine. The station aired a country/western format with local and national news on the half-hour, provided by A.P. teletype wire tickers.

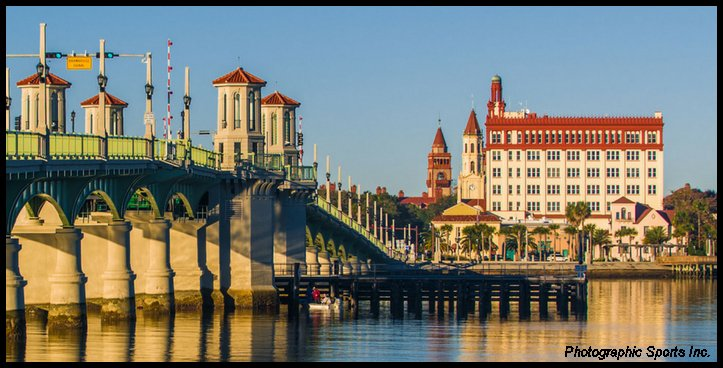
St. Augustine First National Bank Building

=== 1990s ===
WAOC airs a news/talk format in competition with WFOY. Its sister station WJQR signs on.

=== 2000s ===
==== 2002 ====
WAOC is bought by Shull Broadcasting & becomes a sister station to WFOY as "Real Country 1420".

=== 2020s ===
==== 2021 ====
On May 14, 2021, WAOC changed formats from sports to a simulcast of religious-formatted WAYR 550 AM Fleming Island, branded as "Way Radio". Effective July 27, 2021, then owner Phillips Broadcasting sold WAOC and translator W243AW to Good Tidings Trust, Inc. for $199,000.

== Controversy ==
Kevin Leslie Geddings, known on air as "Kevin Leslie" & also husband of WAOC owner Kris Phillips was sentenced on May 7, 2007, due to an October 2006 conviction of 5 counts of fraud when he served as the state lottery commissioner in North Carolina. Geddings must serve 4 years in federal prison in Jesup, Georgia, as well as pay a $25,000 fine. His conviction was vacated on August 27, 2010. The government was ordered to return the $25,000 fine and $500 special assessment Geddings paid. Source: St. Augustine Record. September 7, 2010.
