= WKSL =

Coordinates: 30.281°N 81.570°W

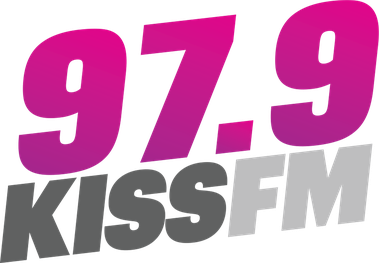
- Neptune Beach, Florida; United States
- Broadcast area: Jacksonville metropolitan area
- Frequency: 97.9 MHz (HD Radio)
- Branding: 97.9 KISS FM

Programming
- Language: English
- Format: Contemporary hit radio
- Subchannels: HD2: WFXJ simulcast (Sports)
- Affiliations: Premiere Networks

Ownership
- Owner: iHeartMedia; (iHM Licenses, LLC)
- Sister stations: WQIK-FM, WFXJ, WJBT, WPLA, WSOL-FM

History
- First air date: August 1965; 61 years ago
- Former call signs: WFOY-FM (1965–1984); WUVU (1984–1992); WSTF (1992–1995); WFSJ-FM (1995–2000); WFKS (2000–2011); WNWW (2011–2014)
- Former frequencies: 97.7 MHz (1965–1992)
- Call sign meaning: Kiss Jacksonville

Technical information
- Licensing authority: FCC
- Facility ID: 67243
- Class: C2
- ERP: 12,500 watts
- HAAT: 302 meters (991 ft)

Links
- Public license information: Public file; LMS
- Webcast: Listen live (via iHeartRadio)
- Website: 979kissfm.iheart.com

WKSL (97.9 FM) is a commercial radio station licensed to Neptune Beach, Florida, and serving the Jacksonville metropolitan area. The station is owned and operated by iHeartMedia, Inc. WKSL airs an adult-leaning contemporary hit radio format. WKSL carries two weekday syndicated programs, with Elvis Duran and the Morning Show from WHTZ New York City, and in middays, WKSL carries On Air with Ryan Seacrest based at KIIS-FM Los Angeles.

WKSL's studios and offices are located on Belfort Parkway in Jacksonville's Southside neighborhood. Its transmitter is in the Arlington neighborhood, on Hogan Road near Pottsburg Creek.

WKSL broadcasts in the HD Radio hybrid format. The HD2 subchannel, which is simulcast on sister station WFXJ, carries a sports talk format known as "Fox Sports Jacksonville". The HD3 subchannel, which was simulcast on FM translator W300CU (107.9 MHz), formerly carried an urban gospel format known as "Praise 107.9". The HD3 subchannel has since been turned off.

== History ==
=== Early history ===
The station was originally licensed to St. Augustine, Florida as WFOY-FM on 97.7 MHz, simulcasting WFOY. In 1984, Shull Broadcasting bought WFOY-AM-FM and changed the FM to Hot AC WUVU "The View 97.7". In 1992, WUVU moved to 97.9 MHz, upgrading its power to 50,000 watts. It was sold to Paxson Broadcasting, which switched WUVU to WSTF (the former call sign what is now WJRR in Orlando) with an oldies format. On February 2, 1995, it flipped to smooth jazz as WFSJ-FM.

=== WFKS "97.9 KISS FM" ===
WFSJ switched formats to rhythmic-leaning CHR at 3 p.m. on March 17, 2000, calling itself "97-9 KISS FM". For a short time it used the call sign WGNE-FM. On July 3, 2000, the call letters changed to WFKS.

From 1994 to 2000, the WFKS call sign was used on 99.9 FM in Palatka, as CHR/Hot AC "99.9 Kiss FM". That station became country music WGNE-FM in 2000, and was moved into the Jacksonville market by Renda Broadcasting in May 2005. It is now "99.9 Gator Country", competing with WKSL's sister station, WQIK-FM.

=== Radio Now 97.9 ===
Radio Now logo from 2011 to 2013

On July 1, 2011, at Noon, after playing "Just Dance" by Lady Gaga featuring Colby O'Donis, WFKS launched into a "Flashback Weekend", playing hits that were popular from the station's 10-year existence, including 1990s songs. The station began promoting "The End of Kiss" at 9 a.m. on the 5th. At that time, after playing "Bye Bye Bye" by NSYNC, WFKS relaunched as "Radio NOW 97-9", while tweaking its format to a more mainstream CHR. The first song on "Radio NOW" was "Kryptonite" by 3 Doors Down. On July 14, WFKS changed its call letters to WNWW to go with the "Radio NOW" branding.

=== Return to "KISS FM" ===
On November 1, 2013, after playing "We Are Young" by Fun featuring Janelle Monáe, WNWW returned to the "Kiss" branding as "97-9 KISS FM", relaunching with a similar "Flashback Weekend" to the one that signed off "Kiss" two years prior. For a short time it kept the WNWW call letters. On August 1, 2014, WNWW changed call letters to WKSL which were originally used on sister station WNCB-FM in Raleigh, North Carolina.
