= WAYR (AM) =

- Fleming Island, Florida; United States
- Broadcast area: Jacksonville metropolitan area
- Frequency: 550 kHz
- Branding: WAY Radio

Programming
- Format: Christian radio

Ownership
- Owner: Good Tidings Trust, Inc.
- Sister stations: WAOC, WAYR-FM

History
- First air date: May 26, 1960
- Call sign meaning: The Way Radio

Technical information
- Licensing authority: FCC
- Facility ID: 24625
- Class: B
- Power: 5,000 watts (day); 500 watts (night)
- Transmitter coordinates: 30°4′22″N 81°47′23″W
- Translator: See § Translators

Links
- Public license information: Public file; LMS
- Website: wayradio.org

WAYR (550 AM) is a non-commercial radio station licensed to Fleming Island, Florida, United States, and serving the Jacksonville metropolitan area. Owned by Good Tidings Trust, Inc., it broadcasts a Christian radio format branded as "Way Radio". WAYR's studios are on Russell Road in Green Cove Springs.

WAYR is also relayed over low-power translator stations W277DE (103.3 FM) and W285FE (104.9 FM).

== History ==
WAYR signed on the air on May 26, 1960. It was initially a daytime-only station, running 1,000 watts, and required to go off the air at night to protect other stations on 550 AM from interference. Its transmitter was located at 661 Blanding Blvd. in Orange Park, Florida. In 1986, WAYR's operations were moved to 2500 Russell Road in Green Cove Springs, Florida, where it remains today, and its power was increased to 2,500 watts.

In the early 2000s, WAYR added nighttime operations of 500 watts and increased its daytime power to 5,000 watts. In the early 2010s, the station changed its city of license to Fleming Island, Florida, although the transmitter, studios and offices remain in Green Cove Springs.

== Programming ==
WAYR's schedule includes Christian talk and teaching programs throughout the entire day.

== Translators ==
Broadcast translators for WAYR
Call sign	Frequency	City of license	FID	FCC info
W277DE	103.3 FM	Fleming Island, Florida	142664	LMS
W285FE	104.9 FM	Jacksonville, Florida	151721	LMS
