= WAYR-FM =

- Brunswick, Georgia; United States
- Broadcast area: Georgia Coast
- Frequency: 90.7 MHz
- Branding: WAY Radio

Programming
- Format: Christian adult contemporary

Ownership
- Owner: Good Tidings Trust, Inc.
- Sister stations: WAYR

History
- First air date: 1996
- Call sign meaning: WAY Radio

Technical information
- Licensing authority: FCC
- Facility ID: 77585
- Class: C3
- ERP: 14,000 watts
- HAAT: 100 meters (330 ft)
- Transmitter coordinates: 31°11′39.8″N 81°29′29.4″W

Links
- Public license information: Public file; LMS
- Webcast: Listen live
- Website: wayradio.com

WAYR-FM (90.7 FM) is a non-commercial radio station licensed to Brunswick, Georgia, United States, and serving the Georgia coast. The station broadcasts a Christian adult contemporary format, and is owned by Good Tidings Trust, Inc.

The studios are on Newcastle Street in Brunswick, Georgia. Good Tidings Trust also owns 5 frequencies in Northeast Florida which broadcast a Christian talk and teaching format. WAYR-FM's transmitter is sited off Rose Drive in Brunswick.

== History ==
In 1996, the station first signed on as WAGQ. It broadcast a Christian adult contemporary format and was owned by Hi I-Q Radio, Inc. It was powered at 1,500 watts, with its signal limited to communities around Brunswick. WAGQ was bought by Good Tidings Trust, Inc. in November 1998 for $100,000.

The call sign was changed to WAYR-FM. Way Radio increased the station's power to 2,300 watts a short time later. In the mid 2000s, it increased its power to 14,000 watts, extending its coverage to an 85-mile stretch of Interstate 95 between Camden County to the south and Liberty County to the north, and west to Wayne and Brantley Counties.
