= WSOL-FM =

Radio station in Florida, United States

- Yulee, Florida; United States
- Broadcast area: Jacksonville metropolitan area / Southeast Georgia
- Frequency: 101.5 MHz (HD Radio)
- Branding: V101.5

Programming
- Language: English
- Format: Urban adult contemporary
- Affiliations: Premiere Networks

Ownership
- Owner: iHeartMedia, Inc.; (iHM Licenses, LLC)
- Sister stations: WQIK-FM, WFXJ, WKSL, WJBT, WPLA

History
- First air date: September 1, 1966 (as WYNR-FM)
- Former call signs: WYNR-FM (1966–1978); WPIQ-FM (1978–1989); WHJX (1989–1991); WHJX-FM (1991–1995)

Technical information
- Licensing authority: FCC
- Facility ID: 23830
- Class: C
- ERP: 100,000 watts
- HAAT: 446 meters (1,463 ft)
- Transmitter coordinates: 30°49′17.00″N 81°44′13.00″W

Links
- Public license information: Public file; LMS
- Webcast: Listen Live
- Website: v1015.iheart.com

WSOL-FM (101.5 MHz) is a commercial radio station known as V101.5. It is licensed to Yulee, Florida, and serves the Jacksonville metropolitan area and Southeast Georgia. Owned and operated by iHeartMedia, Inc., it broadcasts an Urban Adult Contemporary radio format. WSOL-FM's studios are located on Central Parkway in Jacksonville's Southside district. The transmitter is off McKendree Road in Kingsland, Georgia, a couple of miles from the Georgia-Florida border.

Weekday mornings on V101.5 begin with The Steve Harvey Morning Show, syndicated by co-owned Premiere Networks. Overnights feature The Sweat Hotel, a syndicated show hosted by R&B singer Keith Sweat. Local DJs are heard the rest of the day. Urban gospel music is heard on Sunday mornings.

== History ==
On September 1, 1966, the station signed on as WYNR-FM. It was the FM counterpart to AM 790 WYNR (now WSFN), and was licensed to Brunswick, Georgia. It was owned by Dixie Radio, Inc., and simulcast the country music format of the AM station. WYNR-FM’s effective radiated power was 33,000 watts, limiting its coverage to Brunswick and nearby communities, and not a factor in the larger Jacksonville radio market.

In 1978, WYNR-AM-FM were bought by Southcoast Broadcasting. The FM station's call sign switched to WPIQ and it began airing an adult contemporary music format under the branding "101Q". Power was increased to 100,000 watts, but on only a 250-foot tower, so its signal was still not widely heard in the entire Jacksonville market.

In 1989, the AM and FM stations were sold to the Suburban Radio Group for $4.8 million. The WPIQ call letters were shifted over to the AM station, while the FM station became WHJX, airing a Top 40 format. The station used the moniker "Hot 101.5." WHJX received Federal Communications Commission (FCC) permission to increase its height above average terrain (HAAT) to 1,463 feet, making it a true Jacksonville market station.

In early 1994, WHJX rebranded as “101.5 Channel X” playing a mix of alternative rock, hip-hop, rap and a selection of pop music. It was created by programming direction Keith Clark and was dubbed by many in the industry as the "MTV-style format. It was the first of its kind in radio, but might have confused listeners who would hear Coolio, Soundgarden, and then Ace of Base. This eclectic format would only last about six months before it returned to its current format. The station had shown some ratings progress, but it wasn’t fast enough. The station returned to the Hot 101.5 moniker and its urban format.

Over the next several years, WHJX moved from mainstream Top 40 to a more rhythmic contemporary direction.

The station became WSOL-FM on September 8, 1995, playing a variety (thus the "V"-brand) of Old School/Soul and current R&B music. The station was acquired by Jacor, which was a forerunner to current owner iHeartMedia. Jacor also owned Mainstream Urban WJBT (now WBHQ), Jacksonville's other FM station serving the African American community, although aiming at a younger audience.

Former Logo

On November 21, 2014, WSOL-FM broadened the format to include more classic hip hop, along with Urban Adult Contemporary hits. The slogan switched to "Throwback Hip Hop and R&B."

On January 3, 2019, WSOL-FM reverted to Urban AC, still under the "V101.5" branding.

On August 7, 2019, WSOL-FM changed their city of license to Yulee, Florida as part of iHeartMedia's bankruptcy restructuring, which resulted in losing its grandfathered status in the Brunswick, Georgia market. Otherwise, iHeartMedia would have been required to divest WHFX.

== WSOL HD2 ==
WSOL-FM broadcasts using the HD Radio format. On May 8, 2017, WSOL-FMHD2 and translator station 102.3 W272CQ changed their format from oldies (branded as "102.3 The Beach") to classic hits. It branded itself "Sunny 102.3 - Jacksonville's Greatest Hits."

On October 15, 2020, WSOL-FMHD2 and W272CQ dropped the "Sunny 102.3" classic hits format, with a new format to be announced. The format would end up being Spanish-language Christian programming from Buenas Nuevas Network, owner of WUMY in Memphis, Tennessee.
