= WYKB =

Spanish rhythmic station in Jacksonville, Florida

Simulcasts WEWC Callahan
- Fernandina Beach, Florida; United States
- Broadcast area: Jacksonville, Florida
- Frequency: 105.3 MHz (HD Radio)
- Branding: La Raza 92.9 & 105.3

Programming
- Format: Regional Mexican
- Subchannels: HD2: WJNJ simulcast

Ownership
- Owner: Norberto Sanchez; (Norsan Media, LLC)
- Sister stations: WEWC, WJNJ, WJXR, WNNR, WSOS-FM, WVOJ

History
- First air date: 1999 (as WFBJ)
- Former call signs: WFBJ (1999–2000); WXGV (2000–2003); WJSJ (2003–2016); WZDJ (2016–2017)

Technical information
- Licensing authority: FCC
- Facility ID: 40483
- Class: A
- ERP: 3,900 watts
- HAAT: 125 meters (410 ft)
- Transmitter coordinates: 30°30′4″N 81°35′14″W

Links
- Public license information: Public file; LMS
- Website: larazajax.com

WYKB (105.3 FM) is a regional Mexican radio station licensed to Fernandina Beach, Florida, that serves the Jacksonville area. It is owned by Norberto Sanchez's Norsan Media.

== History ==
=== WJSJ ===
Until 2008, WJSJ’s format was smooth jazz. In August 2008, Seven Bridges Media (owner of WJXL & WJXL-FM) entered into a time brokerage agreement to air its sports programming on WJSJ. WJSJ broadcast a classic country format from October 15, 2013 until May 26, 2014. Prior to that, it used to broadcast a Tropical format with emphasis on Salsa and Reggaeton until August 5, 2013, when it flipped to a short-lived classic hits format. By April 2015, then-WJSJ went silent. On November 2, 2015, WJSJ returned to air with sports, programming from the CBS Sports Radio.

=== Classic dance WZDJ ===
On July 1, 2016, WJSJ dropped the CBS Sports Radio format and began stunting. On July 18, 2016, WJSJ launched a classic dance format, branded as "DJ 105.3". The station changed its call sign to WZDJ on July 20, 2016, where afterwards, WZDJ began adding more current music from the Rhythmic and Dance genres, with the recurrents receiving less airplay. During this tenure, it was in the middle of being purchased through a LMA from veteran radio programmer Tony Quarterone for $1.3 million.

=== WYKB ===
On December 31, 2016, WZDJ signed off air due to a lack of advertising support and financial issues, which included the collapse of the sale of the station. The station left a message on its Facebook page that signaled the end of the format and its website and stream were deleted. On January 2, 2017, the station flipped to a simulcast of country-formatted WKBX under the original ownership for the time being. On January 13, 2017, WZDJ changed its callsign to WYKB.

On October 16, 2017, WYKB split from its simulcast with WKBX and changed its format to classic country, branded as "Jax Country 105.3". In January 2020, WYKB became "Jacksonville's JAX 105.3", keeping the classic country format, but with no commercials.

In July 2021, the station switched to a Spanish rhythmic format as "Flow 105.3." Among its core artists were Daddy Yankee, Karol G, Maluma, Ozuna, J Balvin, Bad Bunny, Anitta, Nicky Jam, Natti Natasha and Wisin y Yandel.

In January 2026, WYKB switched to a simulcast of sister station WEWC, which has a regional Mexican format.

== WYKB-HD2 ==
On August 4, 2021, WYKB launched a Spanish adult contemporary format on its HD2 sub-channel, branded as "Azul 105.3 HD2".
