= WBOB (AM) =

News/talk radio station in Jacksonville, Florida

- Jacksonville, Florida; United States
- Broadcast area: Jacksonville metropolitan area
- Frequency: 600 kHz
- Branding: Talkradio AM 600 & FM 101.1 WBOB

Programming
- Format: Conservative talk
- Affiliations: Townhall News; Premiere Networks; Salem Radio Network; Westwood One

Ownership
- Owner: Chesapeake-Portsmouth Broadcasting Corporation
- Sister stations: WMUV

History
- First air date: 1942
- Former call signs: WPDQ (1942–1975); WMBR (1975–1977); WSNY (1977–1980); WAIV (1980–1981); WOKV (1981–1994); WPDQ (1994–1996); WBWL (1996–2010)
- Former frequencies: 1270 kHz (1942–1947)
- Call sign meaning: We're Bob

Technical information
- Licensing authority: FCC
- Facility ID: 53588
- Class: B
- Power: 50,000 watts (day); 9,700 watts (night)
- Transmitter coordinates: 30°18′0″N 81°45′29″W
- Translator: 101.1 W266CX (Fruit Cove)

Links
- Public license information: Public file; LMS
- Webcast: Listen live
- Website: www.wbob.com

WBOB (600 AM) is a commercial radio station licensed to Jacksonville, Florida, United States. Owned by Chesapeake-Portsmouth Broadcasting Corporation, the station airs a conservative talk format branded "Talkradio AM 600 & FM 101.1 WBOB". WBOB's transmitter is sited off of Lenox Avenue in Jacksonville; the station is also relayed over low-power FM translator W266CX (101.1 FM) in Fruit Cove, Florida.

== History ==
=== Early years ===
Originally issued a construction permit for operation on 1270 kHz as WJDC, the station was first licensed October 21, 1942, as WPDQ. It was owned by the Jacksonville Broadcasting Company. In 1947, WPDQ moved to 600 kHz. The station was an ABC affiliate. Henderson Belk, a North Carolina businessman, purchased WPDQ in 1964 from Brush-Moore Newspapers.

=== Moving to AM 600 ===
In the 1960s and early 1970s, WPDQ carried a Top 40 format. In 1975, after Belk sold the station to Robert Rounsaville of Atlanta, it swapped frequencies and licenses with WMBR (1460 AM). WMBR took the better frequency of 600 kHz, describing its format as "Bright MOR Personality". WPDQ moved to 1460 kHz, continuing its Top 40 format.

In 1977, AM 600 switched its call sign to WSNY, calling itself "Sunny 60", although the format remained the same. Then, in 1980, the call sign were changed to WAIV, and began simulcasting Top 40 programming from its FM sister station WAIV-FM, known as "The Big Wave".

=== From country to talk ===
Pop country became the new format in 1981 with a call sign change to WOKV, known as "OK 60 The Unrock". Music continued on WOKV through the 1980s, with various adjustments from pop country to adult contemporary to oldies. In 1986, the station was bought by EZ Communications. AM 600 would then flip to a news/talk format, and was Jacksonville's original home of the syndicated Rush Limbaugh Show.

In 1994, Prism Radio Partners acquired WPDQ (690 AM), the former WAPE. WPDQ had Jacksonville's best AM signal, transmitting with 50,000 watts by day non-directional, and 10,000 watts at night with a directional signal. The WOKV callsign and news/talk programming was moved to 690 AM; the WPDQ callsign was returned to AM 600, with an adult standards format.

=== Sports and Radio Disney ===
In 1996, WPDQ flipped to sports talk as "The Ball"; concurrent with the flip, WPDQ changed call sign to WBWL.

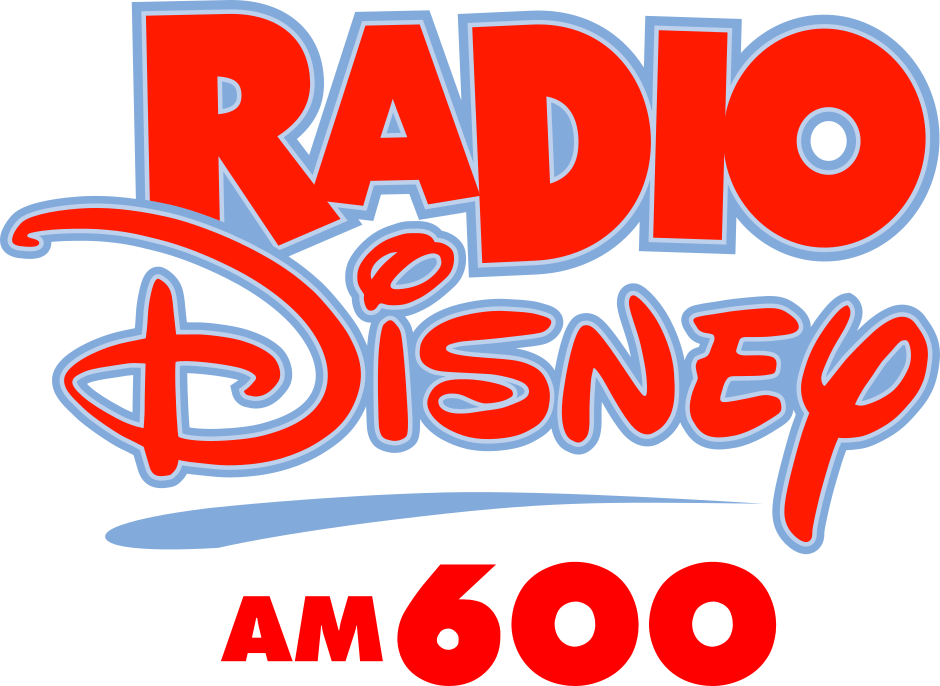
WBWL logo used from 2002 until 2007.

Cox Radio purchased the station in 1999, and in April 2002, WBWL was sold to The Walt Disney Company, and became Jacksonville's affiliate for Radio Disney on August 1 of that year.

=== WBOB talk ===
Children's/contemporary hit radio programming lasted until October 1, 2010, when Radio Disney sold WBWL to Chesapeake-Portsmouth Broadcasting Corporation. The call sign were changed to WBOB, and the format flipped to conservative talk radio, featuring Bill Bennett's Morning in America, Laura Ingraham and Glenn Beck, along with a variety of local news and talk programming.

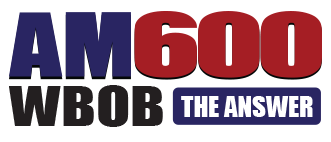
Former logo

As of the 2014 season, WBOB broadcast games from the Arena Football League's Jacksonville Sharks. Also in the mid-2010s, WBOB got a power boost, going from 5,000 watts day and night, to 50,000 watts in the daytime and 9,700 watts at night.

== Programming ==
Weekdays begin with a local news and information show, followed by mostly syndicated conservative talk programming. Most hours begin with news from Townhall.
