= Fruit Cove, Florida =

- CDP
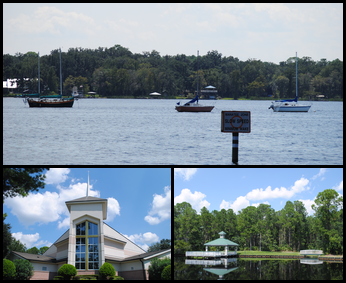
- Julington Creek, Fruit Cove Baptist Church, Julington Creek Community Park

- Location in St. Johns County and the state of Florida
- Coordinates: 30°06′45″N 81°37′30″W
- Country: United States
- State: Florida
- County: St. Johns

Area
  - Total: 18.48 sq mi (47.87 km^{2})
  - Land: 16.12 sq mi (41.74 km^{2})
  - Water: 2.37 sq mi (6.14 km^{2})
- Elevation: 20 ft (6.1 m)

Population (2020)
  - Total: 32,143
  - Density: 1,994.7/sq mi (770.14/km^{2})
- Time zone: UTC-5 (Eastern (EST))
  - Summer (DST): UTC-4 (EDT)
- FIPS code: 12-24925
- GNIS feature ID: 2402509

Fruit Cove is a census-designated place (CDP) in St. Johns County, Florida, United States. It is located in the community of St. Johns. The population was 32,143 at the 2020 census, up from 29,362 at the 2010 census. It is part of the Jacksonville, Florida Metropolitan Statistical Area.

== Geography ==
According to the United States Census Bureau, the CDP has a total area of 17.9 square miles (46 km^{2}), of which 17.9 square miles (46 km^{2}) is land and 0.06% is water.

Fruit Cove is the location of the Marywood Retreat Center for the Diocese of St. Augustine.

== Demographics ==
Historical population
Census	Pop.	Note	%±
1990	5,904		—
2000	16,077		172.3%
2010	29,362		82.6%
2020	32,143		9.5%
U.S. Decennial Census

=== Racial and ethnic composition ===
Fruit Cove racial composition (Hispanics excluded from racial categories) (NH = Non-Hispanic)
Race	Pop 2010	Pop 2020	% 2010	% 2020
White (NH)	25,368	25,376	86.40%	78.95%
Black or African American (NH)	950	1,060	3.24%	3.30%
Native American or Alaska Native (NH)	58	59	0.20%	0.18%
Asian (NH)	766	1,185	2.61%	3.69%
Pacific Islander or Native Hawaiian (NH)	7	12	0.02%	0.04%
Some other race (NH)	45	192	0.15%	0.60%
Two or more races/Multiracial (NH)	477	1,516	1.62%	4.72%
Hispanic or Latino (any race)	1,691	2,743	5.76%	8.53%
Total	29,362	32,143		

=== 2020 census ===
As of the 2020 census, Fruit Cove had a population of 32,143. The median age was 42.6 years. 25.7% of residents were under the age of 18 and 16.3% of residents were 65 years of age or older. For every 100 females there were 95.7 males, and for every 100 females age 18 and over there were 92.7 males age 18 and over.

100.0% of residents lived in urban areas, while 0.0% lived in rural areas.

There were 10,755 households in Fruit Cove, of which 41.6% had children under the age of 18 living in them. Of all households, 71.6% were married-couple households, 8.6% were households with a male householder and no spouse or partner present, and 16.0% were households with a female householder and no spouse or partner present. About 13.8% of all households were made up of individuals and 7.7% had someone living alone who was 65 years of age or older. There were 9,269 families residing in the CDP.

There were 11,114 housing units, of which 3.2% were vacant. The homeowner vacancy rate was 1.0% and the rental vacancy rate was 5.5%.

Racial composition as of the 2020 census
Race	Number	Percent
White	26,217	81.6%
Black or African American	1,108	3.4%
American Indian and Alaska Native	66	0.2%
Asian	1,198	3.7%
Native Hawaiian and Other Pacific Islander	14	0.0%
Some other race	585	1.8%
Two or more races	2,955	9.2%
Hispanic or Latino (of any race)	2,743	8.5%

=== 2010 census ===
As of the 2010 United States census, there were 29,362 people, 9,487 households, and 8,085 families residing in the CDP.

=== 2000 census ===
At the 2000 census there were 16,077 people, 5,294 households, and 4,600 families in the CDP. The population density was 900.2 inhabitants per square mile (347.6/km^{2}). There were 5,549 housing units at an average density of 310.7 per square mile (120.0/km^{2}). The racial makeup of the CDP was 94.76% White, 2.06% Black, 0.18% Native American, 1.61% Asian, 0.14% Pacific Islander, 0.44% from other races, and 0.81% from two or more races. Hispanic or Latino of any race were 2.38%.

Of the 5,294 households 50.6% had children under the age of 18 living with them in 2000, 79.4% were married couples living together, 5.7% had a female householder with no husband present. 10.9% of households were one person and 5.0% were one person aged 65 or older. The average household size was 3.02 and the average family size was 3.26.

In 2000, the age distribution was 32.3% under the age of 18, 4.3% from 18 to 24, 31.8% from 25 to 44, 23.9% from 45 to 64, and 7.7% 65 or older. The median age was 37 years. For every 100 females, there were 100.4 males. For every 100 females age 18 and over, there were 94.5 males.

In 2000, the median household income was $82,159 and the median family income was $84,791. Males had a median income of $62,470 versus $35,775 for females. The per capita income for the CDP was $30,462. About 1.6% of families and 1.9% of the population were below the poverty line, including 2.0% of those under age 18 and 1.7% of those age 65 or over.

== Education ==
St. Johns County School District is the school district for Fruit Cove.

The following elementary schools serve areas of Fruit Cove: Cunningham Creek, Durbin Creek, Freedom Crossing, Hickory Creek, and Julington Creek.

Three middle schools serve portions: Freedom Crossing, Fruit Cove, and Switzerland Point.

Two high schools serve portions: Bartram Trail High School and Creekside High School.

St Johns County Public Library System operates the Bartram Trail Branch.
