= WYMM =

Jacksonville, Florida; United States
- Broadcast area: Jacksonville metropolitan area
- Frequency: 1530 kHz
- Branding: Caribbean Power Radio

Programming
- Format: Caribbean

Ownership
- Owner: AVM Broadcasting LLC

History
- First air date: October 26, 1987
- Former call signs: WJGR (1987–1989); WJGC (1989–1992); WCRJ (1992–1996); WOBS (1996–2003)

Technical information
- Licensing authority: FCC
- Facility ID: 11127
- Class: D
- Power: 50,000 watts (days only)
- Transmitter coordinates: 30°21′50.00″N 81°44′54.00″W
- Translator: 96.5 W243DO (Jacksonville)

Links
- Public license information: Public file; LMS
- Website: wymm965.com

WYMM (1530 AM) is a commercial radio station licensed to Jacksonville, Florida, United States, serving the Jacksonville metropolitan area. Owned by AVM Broadcasting LLC, it broadcasts a Caribbean format targeting Jacksonville's Caribbean and Haitian communities. WYMM's transmitter, studios and offices are on Picketville Road in the Biltmore neighborhood of Jacksonville.

WYMM only operates during the daytime hours; programming is heard around the clock on FM translator W243DO at 96.5 MHz.

== History ==
The station signed on the air on October 26, 1987, as WJGR. Over the years, it had several call letter changes, from WJGC to WCRJ to WOBS. In 2003, it took its current call sign, WYMM.

Prior to March 2014, it was "La Poderosa", playing a Regional Mexican music format. It later spent time with a Haitian format, with its hosts speaking Haitian Creole and English. It later became "Caribbean Power Radio," a syndicated format targeting mostly English-speakers from countries in the Caribbean with some Haitian programming.
