= Jim Daly (evangelist) =

President of Focus on the Family

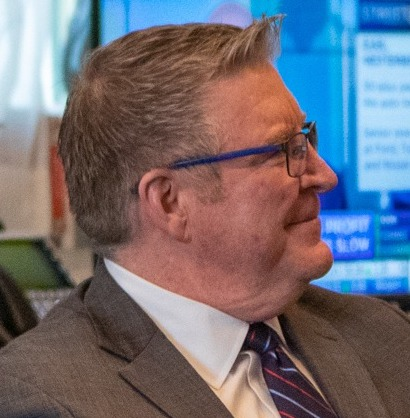
- Jim Daly in February 2020
- Born: 22 July 1961 (age 63); Alhambra, California, U.S.
- Education: California State University, San Bernardino; Regis University (MBA)
- Occupation(s): President and CEO of Focus on the Family
- Spouse: Jean Daly
- Children: 2

Jim Daly (born July 22, 1961) is the head of Focus on the Family, an international Christian communications ministry based in Colorado Springs, Colorado. He succeeded founder James Dobson in 2005.

Daly is the main host of the Focus on the Family radio program.

== Early life, influence, education and career ==
Daly grew up in Southern California. He was abandoned by his alcoholic father at age five, and orphaned by his mother's death from cancer when he was nine. He was then placed in a foster home, initially in Morongo Valley, California. By the time that Daly was a senior in high school, he was living on his own.

Daly experienced a Christian conversion at age 15 while attending a camp run by the Fellowship of Christian Athletes. He went on to study at California State University, San Bernardino, and eventually earned his Master of Business Administration from Regis University.

Daly worked in the paper industry until he was recruited to join Focus on the Family, at one-third of his six-figure private-sector pay.

== Focus on the Family ==
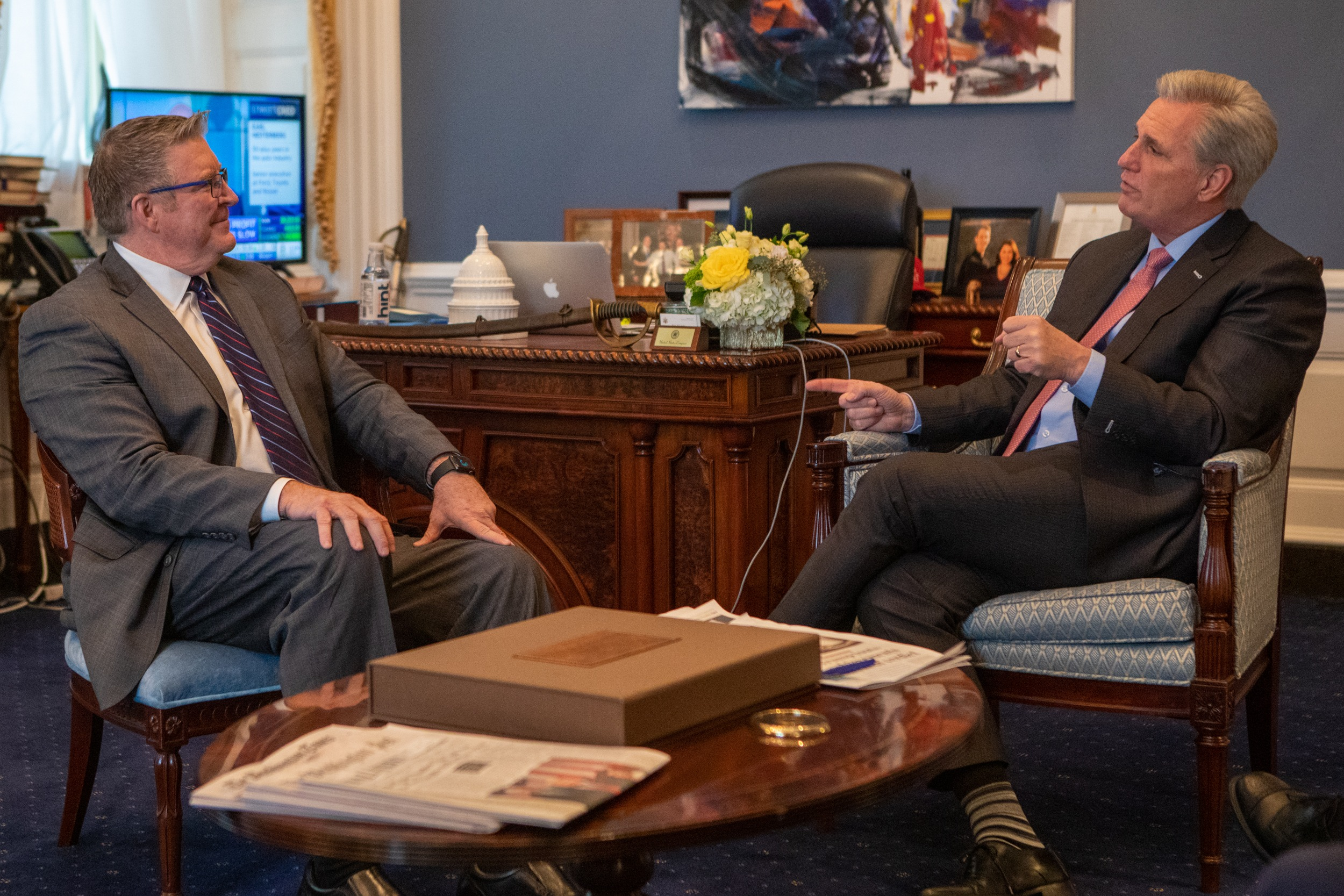
Daly meeting with Kevin McCarthy in 2020.

In 2009, the Denver Post reported that Daly shared Dobson's views in the public-policy arena, but had taken a different approach from that of his predecessor. Daly referred to himself as more of an evangelist than a prophet. He believed that the Christian community should demonstrate the values it wishes to promote, and maintain civil discourse.

While Dobson's approach was often political, Daly and his colleagues have said that he is trying to make it less so.

According to reports from 2009 and 2010, Daly and his colleagues, similarly to Dobson, opposed abortion and same-sex marriage, but also wished to address issues other than these typical evangelical hot-button issues; they "want[ed] to frame political work as an inspirational call to do good—not just to oppose what they view[ed] as sinful behavior."

In a 2009 interview with the Washington Post, Daly stated,

I am pro-life, I am pro-traditional marriage. At the same time, I'm also a person who looks for the conversation. ... The question I have is, Where can we meet on common ground?

Daly also told the Post, "We will definitely be rigorous in the policy debate. We're not going to back out of that or back off expressing a biblical worldview in the public square."

Daly said that he wished to make abortion much rarer as a step toward eliminating it.

In addition to meeting with abortion rights groups at the state and local levels, Daly met with organizational leaders who were traditionally at odds with conservative Protestants, including the Colorado-based gay rights organization the Gill Foundation. Daly also participated in the White House's Fatherhood Initiative. With the Colorado Springs Independent the two organizations co-sponsored an event supporting foster families.

Daly's childhood experience possibly influenced him to start Wait No More, an organization that encourages Christians to adopt children. Wait No More possibly led to a drop in the number of children in foster care in Colorado from 900 to 365. Daly wants Colorado to become the first state to "wipe out the waiting list for foster care."

In 2012, it was reported that Daly reached out to the younger generation through writing for Catalyst, a ministry that develops Christian leaders, and through various speaking engagements at venues such as Kings College in NYC, as well as "The Civil Conversations Project" from On Being with Krista Tippett, featuring conversation between Daly and Q Ideas leader Gabe Lyons.

In 2017, an Associated Press story published by the Denver Post reported that under Daly, Focus on the Family "has scaled back involvement in politics ... [Daly] sees himself as part of a younger generation of religious leadership. ... 'Jesus does not go after Caesar much -- he dealt with people at their point of need,' Daly said, touting the ministry's radio show, counseling and efforts promoting foster care and adoption." A similar assessment is made by religious-studies scholar Susan B. Ridgely, writing in 2017 that Daly has "reached out to second-generation evangelicals ... by softening Dobson's stance on homosexuality, matching anti-abortion rhetoric with pro-adoption and foster care discussion, and keeping open dialogue with all regardless of political party."

== Host of the daily radio broadcast ==
Daly hosts a radio broadcast with John Fuller.

== Radio and media attention ==
Daly has appeared on national television programs such as Fox and Friends, Larry King Live, America Live with Megyn Kelly, and ABC World News Tonight. In 2010 he was named one of the nation's top new evangelical leaders by Newsweek. He relates the story of his difficult upbringing in the 2021 Kendrick Brothers documentary Show Me the Father.

== Selected bibliography ==
- Finding Home: An Imperfect Path to Faith and Family, David C. Cook Communications, 2007
- Stronger: Trading Brokenness for Unbreakable Strength, David C. Cook Communications, 2010
- ReFocus: Living a Life That Reflects God's Heart, Zondervan, 2012
- The Best Advice I Ever Got on Parenting, Worthy Publishing, 2012 ISBN 9781936034482
- The Best Advice I Ever Got on Marriage, Worthy Publishing, 2012 ISBN 9781936034499

Daly is also a regular panelist for The Washington Post/Newsweek blog "On Faith."
