= WJBT =

Coordinates: 30.2811°N 81.5701°W

- Callahan, Florida; United States
- Broadcast area: Jacksonville metropolitan area
- Frequency: 93.3 MHz (HD Radio)
- Branding: 93.3 The Beat

Programming
- Format: Mainstream urban
- Subchannels: HD2: Black-oriented news (BIN)
- Affiliations: Premiere Networks

Ownership
- Owner: iHeartMedia, Inc.; (iHM Licenses, LLC)
- Sister stations: WFXJ, WKSL, WPLA, WQIK-FM, WSOL-FM

History
- Former call signs: WLKC (1983–1990); WAIA (1990–1995); WPLA (1995–2005); WROO (2005–2008)
- Call sign meaning: "Jacksonville's Beat"

Technical information
- Licensing authority: FCC
- Facility ID: 51975
- Class: C1
- ERP: 98,000 watts
- HAAT: 302 meters (991 ft)
- Translator: HD2: 104.1 W281AM (Macclenny)

Links
- Public license information: Public file; LMS
- Webcast: Listen Live; HD2: Listen Live
- Website: wjbt.iheart.com HD2: jacksonville.binnews.com

WJBT (93.3 FM "93.3 The Beat") is a commercial radio station licensed to Callahan, Florida, and serving the Jacksonville metropolitan area. It airs a mainstream urban radio format and is owned by iHeartMedia, Inc. The studios and offices are on Central Parkway in the Southside neighborhood.

WJBT has an effective radiated power of 98,000 watts, the highest permitted for non-grandfathered FM stations. The transmitter is off Hogan Road in the Arlington neighborhood. WJBT broadcasts using HD Radio technology. The HD2 digital subchannel carries iHeart's Black Information Network, which feeds FM translator W281AM at 104.1 in Macclenny.

== History ==
WJBT has been in its current format since 1992 (when it was on 92.7), playing Hip Hop and R&B music. It was home to the nationally syndicated Doug Banks Morning Show (who was replaced with Steve Harvey after its move to 93.3, and later, The Breakfast Club). Its only other competitor is its own sister station, Urban AC-formatted WSOL-FM. WJBT was the second urban radio station to adopt "The Beat" branding after Los Angeles' KKBT.

When it was on 92.7, it served the Jacksonville area, but it did not have enough power to serve the northernmost and westernmost portions of the metro because its frequency was licensed to Green Cove Springs, Florida. However, it had no effect on the Arbitron ratings as it is still among the Top 5 (sometimes 10) most listened to stations in the city.

On November 2, 2007, Clear Channel spun off the 92.7 frequency to a private company (which moved the signal to the Palm Coast area as WBHQ) and on the evening of December 25 of that same year, moved the station and its format to the more powerful 93.3 signal (formerly the home of Country outlet WROO). The reason for this was to comply with FCC ownership rules, since WJBT was in a waiver status in which Clear Channel was allowed to own six FMs and one AM in the market. But because of Clear Channel Communications being sold to a private investment group, WJBT's current frequency had to be divested. After Christmas Day 2007, 92.7 and 93.3 were simulcasting. However, on January 11, 2008, a new urban gospel station debuted on the 92.7 frequency named "Hallelujah FM", which is a moniker currently used for many Clear Channel-owned gospel stations nationwide. Also, the call letters were switched, with 92.7 becoming WROO and 93.3 becoming WJBT.

With the move to a more powerful signal, WJBT also received an upgrade in power as well, going from 50 kW to 100 kW, thus covering most of Jacksonville and Northeastern Florida.

== On-air personalities ==
- The Breakfast Club
- Uptown Angela
- T-Roy
- Easy E
- DJ Q45
- DJ Ian
- Big Sue
- DJ Wizkidd
