= Jaguars Radio Network =

Regional play-by-play radio network

Jacksonville Jaguars Radio Network
- Type: Radio network
- Country: United States
- Headquarters: Jacksonville, Florida
- Broadcast area: Florida; Georgia (limited); South Carolina (limited)
- Owner: Jacksonville Jaguars
- Established: 1995
- Affiliation: NFL
- Affiliates: English-language: 21 (including 3 flagships); Spanish-language: 1
- Official website: www.jaguars.com/radioaffiliates

The Jacksonville Jaguars Radio Network is an American radio network composed of 21 radio stations which carry English-language coverage of the Jacksonville Jaguars, a professional football team in the National Football League (NFL). An additional station also carries Spanish-language coverage of the team.

Since 2014, Jacksonville market stations WJXL (1010 AM), WJXL-FM (92.5 FM), and WGNE-FM (99.9 FM) have served as the network's three flagships. The network also includes 18 affiliates in the U.S. states of Florida, Georgia and South Carolina: seven AM stations, six of which supplement their signals with a low-power FM translator; ten full-power FM stations; and one HD Radio subchannel which supplements its signal with a low-power FM translator. Frank Frangie is the lead announcer along with color commentator Jeff Lageman. Spanish-language game coverage is broadcast over WFXJ (930 AM), which supplements its signal with an FM translator and an HD Radio subchannel simulcast.

In addition to traditional over-the-air AM and FM broadcasts, network programming airs on satellite radio via SiriusXM and is available online via Sirius XM, TuneIn and NFL+.

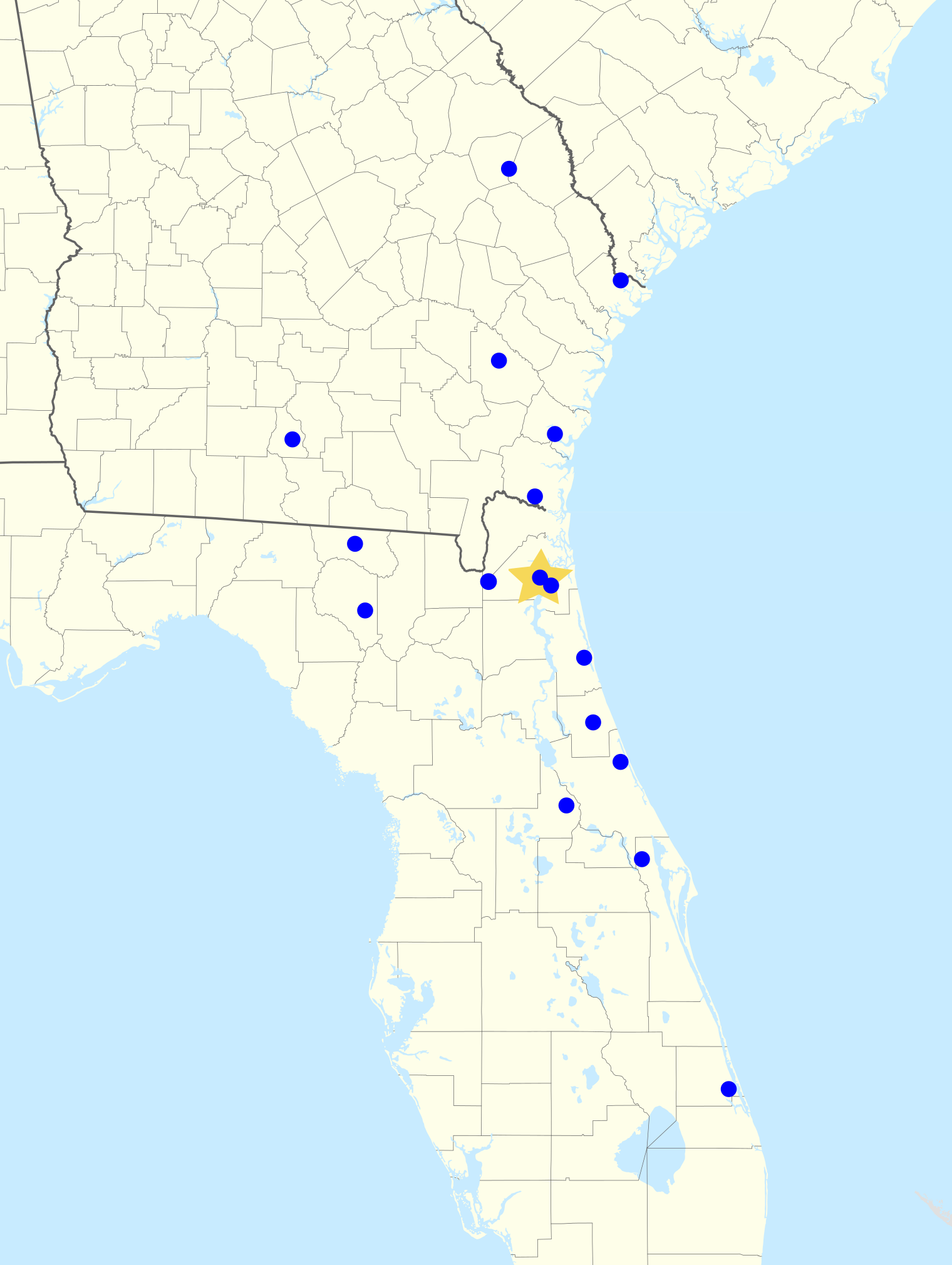
2015 map of radio affiliates.

== Station list ==
=== English-language stations ===
Callsign	Frequency	Band	City	State	Network status
WJXL	1010	AM	Jacksonville	Florida	Flagship
WJXL-FM	92.5	FM	Jacksonville	Florida	Flagship
WGNE-FM	99.9	FM	Jacksonville	Florida	Flagship
WDYZ	660	AM	Altamonte Springs (Orlando)	Florida	Affiliate
WNZF	1550	AM	Bunnell	Florida	Affiliate
W235CW	94.9	FM	Bunnell	Florida	WNZF relay
WCCP-FM	105.5	FM	Clemson	South Carolina	Affiliate
WAHT	1560	AM	Cowpens (Spartanburg)	South Carolina	Affiliate
W248DD	97.5	FM	Cowpens (Spartanburg)	South Carolina	WAHT relay
WHFX	107.7	FM	Darien (Brunswick)	Georgia	Affiliate
WAJD	1390	AM	Gainesville	Florida	Affiliate
W255CV	98.9	FM	Gainesville	Florida	WAJD relay
WLOP	1370	AM	Jesup	Georgia	Affiliate
WIFO-FM	105.5	FM	Jesup	Georgia	Affiliate
WKBX	106.3	FM	Kingsland	Georgia	Affiliate
WJTK	96.5	FM	Lake City	Florida	Affiliate
WJZS	106.1	FM	Live Oak	Florida	Affiliate
WFLA-FM	100.7	FM	Midway (Tallahassee)	Florida	Affiliate
WHOG-FM	95.7	FM	Ormond-by-the-Sea (Daytona Beach)	Florida	Affiliate
W288CJ	105.5	FM	Oviedo	Florida	WDYZ relay
WPAP-HD2	92.5-2	FM	Panama City	Florida	Affiliate
W242BF	96.3	FM	Panama City	Florida	WPAP-HD2 relay
W273DU	102.5	FM	Panama City	Florida	WPAP-HD2 relay
WRWN	107.9	FM	Port Royal (Savannah)	South Carolina	Affiliate
WFOY	1240	AM	St. Augustine	Florida	Affiliate
W271CJ	102.1	FM	St. Augustine	Florida	WFOY relay
WZLB	103.1	FM	Valparaiso (Fort Walton Beach)	Florida	Affiliate
WAYX	1230	AM	Waycross	Georgia	Affiliate
W242BE	96.3	FM	Waycross	Georgia	WAYX relay

- Blue background indicates FM translator.
- Gray background indicates station is a simulcast of another station.

=== Spanish-language stations ===
Callsign	Frequency	Band	City	State	Network status
WFXJ	930	AM	Jacksonville	Florida	Spanish flagship
WKSL-HD2	97.9-2	FM	Jacksonville	Florida	WFXJ simulcast
W247CF	98.9	FM	Jacksonville	Florida	WFXJ relay

- Blue background indicates FM translator.
- Gray background indicates station is a simulcast of another station.
