= List of current NFL broadcasters =

This is a list of active NFL broadcasters, including those for each individual team as well as those that have national rights. Unlike the other three major professional sports leagues in the United States (Major League Baseball, the NBA and the NHL), all regular-season and post-season games are shown on American television on one of the national networks. Most preseason games are still televised by regional/local broadcasters, with selected preseason games simulcast on national networks.

== Background ==
All regular-season and postseason games are shown in the United States on one of following national networks: the broadcast networks of ABC, CBS, Fox, or NBC; the cable channels ESPN or NFL Network; or streamed exclusively on Amazon Prime Video, Netflix, or Peacock. The league does not, in general, have an anti-siphoning rule for regular season games, and such games can be (and are) carried on both the cable outlet and the local affiliate. For those regular season games aired exclusively on cable networks ESPN or NFL Network, or exclusively on one of the aforementioned over-the-top streaming services, they are also simulcast on a local broadcast station in each of the home markets of the two participating teams (determined by a bidding process). ESPN may also simulcast selected games on their sister national broadcast network ABC. Likewise, As part of the Sports Broadcasting Act of 1961, the U.S. government granted the NFL permission to sell the rights to all regular season and postseason games to the national networks, as an exemption to antitrust laws.

Most preseason games, except a few contests such as the Pro Football Hall of Fame Game, are not televised by the national networks, and the league leaves television rights for those contests up to the individual teams. Most teams produce the games, either themselves or with help from the networks, and set up small syndication networks to carry games throughout the league-designated primary and secondary markets each team serves. The stations that win bidding to locally broadcast cable games are not necessarily the same as the ones who broadcast preseason contests, as the bidding processes are separate; this list is of the preseason broadcasters. In the event that a preseason game does not sell out, the local rightsholder must delay the broadcast a minimum of 24 hours (this rule, along with the rest of the league's blackout policies, was suspended for the 2015 season). NFL Network sometimes simulcasts select preseason games using the feeds of the local broadcast crews. In these cases, the NFL does impose an anti-siphoning rule and does not carry a live game in a particular market if a local station is broadcasting the same game.

On radio, all 32 teams have regional/local syndication networks that carry all preseason, regular season and most postseason games; these are listed here. Radio syndication networks are mostly unrestricted and can be carried anywhere in North America, and several supplemental networks (Compass Media Networks, Sports USA Radio Network) also carry additional Sunday afternoon games outside the home teams' markets. The league's night games are carried both by local networks and by the NFL on Westwood One, a partnership that goes back several decades; the Super Bowl is exclusive to Westwood One, and local broadcasts of that game can only be carried on one flagship station in each team's market. Spanish language national radio is held by Entravision, which sublicenses the game broadcasts to TUDN and Latino Media Network stations.

== Regional broadcasters ==
The following is a list of local radio and preseason television broadcasters for each individual team. Four teams, the Arizona Cardinals, the Baltimore Ravens, the Minnesota Vikings, and the New England Patriots do preseason television/radio simulcasts. Some teams, like the New York Giants and the San Francisco 49ers, have their regular radio announcers call their preseason telecasts, and then a different announcing team call their preseason radio broadcasts. For the preseason telecasts of many other teams, they may employ announcers who work for the national networks (either NFL or college football games) during the regular season.

Several teams also offer Spanish language broadcasts to serve their Hispanic fan bases.

Preseason TV broadcasters
Preseason TV/radio simulcasts

=== AFC ===
==== AFC East ====
Team	Play-by-play	Analyst	Sideline reporter	Flagship station(s)	Number of affiliates
Buffalo Bills	Chris Brown	Eric Wood	Steve Tasker	WGRF	21
Buffalo Bills	Andrew Catalon	Steve Tasker	Maddy Glab	WIVB/WNLO	9 (Note: Includes: WROC-TV (Rochester, NY); WSYR-TV (Syracuse, NY); WPNY-LD (Utica, NY); WETM-DT2 (Elmira, NY); WTEN-TV (Albany, NY); WWTI-TV (Watertown, NY); WIVT-TV (Binghamton, NY); WJET-TV (Erie, PA); WFFF-TV (Burlington, VT))
Miami Dolphins	Jimmy Cefalo	Joe Rose	Kim Bokamper	WINZ/WBGG-FM	20
Miami Dolphins	Steve Goldstein	Kim Bokamper	Mike Cugno	WFOR/WBFS	4 (Note: Includes: WHDT-TV (West Palm Beach, FL); WINK-TV (Fort Myers, FL); WFTV-TV (Orlando, FL); KHON-TV (Honolulu, HI))
Miami Dolphins	Roly Martin	Eduardo Martell		WQBA (Spanish radio)	
New England Patriots	Bob Socci	Scott Zolak (Regular season); Phil Perry (Preseason)		WBZ-FM	37
New England Patriots	Scott Zolak	Devin McCourty and Jason McCourty	Steve Burton and Brian Hoyer	WBZ/WSBK	10 (Note: Includes: WNAC-TV (Providence, RI); WCTX-TV (New Haven, CT); WWLP-DT2 (Springfield, MA); WMUR-TV (Manchester, NH); WMTW-TV (Portland, ME); WVII-TV (Bangor, ME); WCAX-TV (Burlington, VT); KYUR (Anchorage, AK); KATN-TV (Fairbanks, AK); KJUD-TV (Juneau, AK))
New York Jets	Bob Wischusen (primary); Dan Graca (select games when Wischusen is on assignment)	Anthony Becht (Regular season); Quincy Enunwa (Preseason)	Caroline Hendershot Eric Allen (Preseason)	WAXQ	7
New York Jets	Ian Eagle	Anthony Becht	Otis Livingston and Caroline Hendershot	WCBS/WLNY	1
New York Jets	Clemson Smith-Muñiz	Oscar Benitez		WADO (Spanish radio)	
==== AFC North ====
Baltimore Ravens	Kyle Youmans	Rod Woodson	Kirk McEwen (regular season); Evan Washburn (preseason)	WIYY/WBAL	17
Baltimore Ravens	Kyle Youmans	Rod Woodson	Kirk McEwen (regular season); Evan Washburn (preseason)	WBAL-TV	3
Cincinnati Bengals	Dan Hoard	Dave Lapham and Tony Pike		WCKY/WEBN/WLW	26
Cincinnati Bengals	Mike Watts	Anthony Muñoz	Joe Danneman	WXIX	6
Cleveland Browns	Andrew Siciliano	Nathan Zegura	Je'Rod Cherry	WKRK-FM/WNCX/WKNR	30
Cleveland Browns	Chris Rose	Joe Thomas	Aditi Kinkhabwala	WEWS	5
Cleveland Browns	Rafael Hernandez-Brito	Octavio Sequera		WLFM-LP (Spanish radio)	
Pittsburgh Steelers	Rob King	Max Starks	Missi Matthews	WDVE/WBGG	50
Pittsburgh Steelers	Bob Pompeani	Charlie Batch	Missi Matthews	KDKA/WPKD	7
Pittsburgh Steelers	Arturo Carlos and Alvaro Martin	Luis Rodríguez		Steelers en Español (Spanish radio)	1
==== AFC South ====
Houston Texans	Marc Vandermeer	Andre Ware	John Harris	KILT/KILT-FM /KIKK-FM	34
Houston Texans	Kevin Kugler	N. D. Kalu	John Harris and Shelby Coppedge	KTRK	13
Houston Texans	Enrique Vasquez	Gustavo Rangel		KLOL (Spanish radio)	
Indianapolis Colts	Matt Taylor	Rick Venturi (Regular season)	Larra Overton (Regular season); Jeffrey Gorman (Preseason)	WIBC-HD2/WLHK	40
Indianapolis Colts	Greg Rakestraw	Rick Venturi	Larra Overton	WTTV/WXIN	7
Jacksonville Jaguars	Frank Frangie	Jeff Lageman	Rick Ballou	WJXL/WJXL-FM/WGNE-FM	18
Jacksonville Jaguars	Brian Sexton	Bucky Brooks	Brent Martineau	WJAX/WFOX	10
Tennessee Titans	Taylor Zarzour	Ramon Foster	Amie Wells	WGFX	63
Tennessee Titans	Paul Burmeister	Charles Davis	Cory Curtis	WKRN	10
==== AFC West ====
Denver Broncos	Dave Logan	Rick Lewis	Susie Wargin	KOA	70
Denver Broncos	Steve Levy	Ryan Harris	Cynthia Frelund and Scotty Gange	KUSA/KTVD	15
Kansas City Chiefs	Mitch Holthus	Danan Hughes	Josh Klingler	WDAF-FM; KFNZ (selected games); KFNZ-FM	89
Kansas City Chiefs	Ari Wolfe	Trent Green	Matt McMullen	KSHB/KMCI	10
Kansas City Chiefs	Enrique Morales	Oscar Monterroso	Hannah Bassham	KCTO (Spanish radio)	
Las Vegas Raiders	Jason Horowitz (Regular season); JT the Brick (Preseason)	Kirk Morrison (Regular season); Eric Allen (Preseason)		KOMP/KRLV	17
Las Vegas Raiders	Jason Horowitz	Kirk Morrison and Rich Gannon		KVVU/KRON	6
Las Vegas Raiders	Harry Ruiz	Ernesto Amador		KENO (Spanish radio)	8
Los Angeles Chargers	Matt Smith	Daniel Jeremiah	Shannon Farren	KFI/KLSD	14
Los Angeles Chargers	Noah Eagle	Dan Fouts	Jamie Maggio	KCBS/KCAL/KFMB	7
Los Angeles Chargers	Adrián García Márquez	Jorge Villanueva		KBUE/KBUA (Spanish radio)	
Los Angeles Chargers				KRCA (Spanish TV)	

=== NFC ===
==== NFC East ====
Team	Play-by-play	Analyst	Sideline reporter	Flagship station(s)	Number of affiliates
Dallas Cowboys	Brad Sham	Babe Laufenberg	Kristi Scales	KRLD-FM/KRLD	63
Dallas Cowboys	Bill Jones	Isaiah Stanback		KTVT/KTXA	24
Dallas Cowboys	Victor Villalba	Luis Perez		KMVK (Spanish radio)	15
New York Giants	Bob Papa (Regular season); Chris Carrino (Preseason)	Carl Banks (Regular season); Shaun O'Hara (Preseason)	Howard Cross (Regular season); Paul Dottino (Preseason)	WFAN/WFAN-FM	13
New York Giants	Bob Papa	Carl Banks and Phil Simms	Howard Cross and Bruce Beck	WNBC	8
Philadelphia Eagles	Merrill Reese	Mike Quick		WIP-FM	11
Philadelphia Eagles	Scott Graham	Ross Tucker	Dave Spadaro	WCAU	5
Philadelphia Eagles	Rickie Ricardo	Oscar Budejen	Bill Kulik	Tico Sports (Spanish radio)	
Washington Commanders	Bram Weinstein	London Fletcher	Logan Paulsen	WBIG-FM	
Washington Commanders	Dan Hellie	John Riggins and Brian Mitchell	Bryan Colbert Jr.	WUSA	6
==== NFC North ====
Chicago Bears	Jeff Joniak	Tom Thayer	Jason McKie	WMVP	29
Chicago Bears	Adam Amin	Jim Miller and Stacey Dales	Jasmine Baker	WFLD/WPWR	10
Chicago Bears	Miguel Esparza	Omar Ramos, Jorge Moreno and Elio Benitez		WRTO (Spanish radio)	
Detroit Lions	Dan Miller; Jason Benetti (select games)	Lomas Brown	T. J. Lang	WXYT-FM	50
Detroit Lions	Jack Kizer (Preseason week 1); Jason Benetti (Preseason weeks 2–3)	T. J. Lang	Patty Cesarini	WJBK/WADL	6
Green Bay Packers	Wayne Larrivee	Larry McCarren	John Kuhn	WRIT-FM(Network flagship); WTAQ/WIXX (Green Bay primary stations)	56
Green Bay Packers	Kevin Harlan	John Kuhn	Karley Marotta	WTMJ/WGBA	12
Minnesota Vikings	Paul Allen	Pete Bercich	Ben Leber	100.3 FM KFAN	69
Minnesota Vikings	Paul Allen	Pete Bercich	Ben Leber	KMSP/WFTC	15
Minnesota Vikings	Gabriel Rios	Carlos Escalona, Isaias Nunez		WREY Tico Sports (Spanish Radio)	
==== NFC South ====
Atlanta Falcons	Wes Durham	David Archer	John Michaels	WZGC	37
Atlanta Falcons	Justin Kutcher	D. J. Shockley and Coy Wire	Jen Hale	WAGA	10
Carolina Panthers	Anish Shroff (Regular season); Jim Szoke (Preseason)	Jake Delhomme, Jordan Gross, Luke Kuechly or Jim Szoke	Sharon Thorsland	WRFX/WDNC	60
Carolina Panthers	Anish Shroff	Steve Smith Sr. and Jake Delhomme	Carla Gebhart	WJZY/WRAL	13
Carolina Panthers	Jaime Moreno	Luis Moreno Jr.		WGSP (Spanish radio)	10
New Orleans Saints	Mike Hoss	Deuce McAllister	Kristian Garic	WWL/WWL-FM	36
New Orleans Saints	Joel Meyers	Jon Stinchcomb	Terron Armstead	WVUE	12
New Orleans Saints	Mario Jerez	Juan Carlos Ramos	Victor Quiñonez	KGLA/WFNO (Spanish radio)	
Tampa Bay Buccaneers	Tony Castricone	Dave Moore	T. J. Rives	WXTB	22
Tampa Bay Buccaneers	Chris Myers	Ronde Barber	Aileen Hnatiuk	WFLA/WTTA	5
Tampa Bay Buccaneers	Carlos Bohórquez	Martín Gramática and Francisco Negrete		WTMP-FM/WMGG (Spanish radio)	
==== NFC West ====
Arizona Cardinals	J. P. Shadrick	A. Q. Shipley	Dani Sureck	KTAR-FM/AM	13
Arizona Cardinals	Paul Calvisi	Sam Acho	Dani Sureck	KPHO/KTVK	3
Arizona Cardinals	Gabriel Trujillo	Rolando Cantú		KQMR/KHOV-FM (Spanish radio)	
Los Angeles Rams	J. B. Long (Regular season); Camryn Irwin (Preseason)	Maurice Jones-Drew	D'Marco Farr	KSPN/KCBS-FM	9
Los Angeles Rams	J. B. Long	Rob Havensten and Jourdan Rodrigue		KCBS/KCAL/KFMB	9
Los Angeles Rams	Troy Santiago	Ricardo Lopez		KWKW (Spanish radio)	
Los Angeles Rams				KFTR (Spanish TV)	
San Francisco 49ers	Greg Papa; Guy Haberman (during Papa's absences)	Tim Ryan (Regular season); Keena Turner (Preseason)		KNBR/KNBR-FM; KSAN-FM KSFO (When Giants on KNBR)	23
San Francisco 49ers	Guy Haberman	Tim Ryan	Vern Glenn	KPIX/KPYX	14
Seattle Seahawks	Steve Raible	Dave Wyman	Jen Mueller	KIRO AM/FM	45
Seattle Seahawks	Kate Scott	Michael Robinson and Michael Bennett	Cliff Avril	KING/KONG	12

== National broadcasters ==
All regular-season and playoff games, as well as some preseason games, are shown in the United States on one of the following national networks. If a regular season game is nationally exclusive on either the cable networks ESPN or NFL Network, or exclusively on a streaming service like Amazon Prime Video, it is also simulcast on a local broadcast station in each of the home markets of the two participating teams.

=== Lead national broadcasters ===
Network	Lead play-by-play	Lead analyst	Lead sideline reporter	Notes
NFL on CBS	Jim Nantz	J. J. Watt (color); Gene Steratore (rules)	Tracy Wolfson	National Sunday afternoon and evening regular season games, NFL playoffs and the Super Bowl
NFL on Fox	Kevin Burkhardt	Tom Brady (color); Mike Pereira or Dean Blandino (rules)	Erin Andrews and Tom Rinaldi	National Sunday afternoon and evening regular season games, NFL playoffs and the Super Bowl
NFL on NBC (NBC Sunday Night Football)	Mike Tirico	Cris Collinsworth (color); Terry McAulay (rules)	Melissa Stark	Hall of Fame Game, NFL kickoff and national Sunday night regular season games, NFL playoffs and the Super Bowl
NFL on ESPN/NFL on ABC (Monday Night Football)	Joe Buck	Troy Aikman (color); Russell Yurk (rules)	Lisa Salters and Laura Rutledge	National Monday night regular season games, NFL playoffs, the Pro Bowl, and the Super Bowl
NFL on Prime Video (Thursday Night Football)	Al Michaels	Kirk Herbstreit (color); Terry McAulay (rules)	Kaylee Hartung	National Thursday night regular season games, Black Friday game, and one Wild Card game
NFL Network Exclusive Game Series	Dave Pasch; Bob Wischusen	Kurt Warner; Jason Kelce; Louis Riddick (color); Russell Yurk (rules)	Molly McGrath	NFL International Series and late-season Saturday games
NFL on Netflix	Noah Eagle	Luke Kuechly (color); Terry McAulay (rules)	MJ Acosta-Ruiz; Tom Pelissero	Christmas Day games, NFL Melbourne game, Thanksgiving Eve game, and one Week 18 game
NFL on Westwood One Sports	Kevin Harlan; Ryan Radtke; Kevin Kugler; Jason Horowitz; Scott Graham; Oliver Wilson; Jason Benetti; John Sadak; Tom McCarthy	Ross Tucker; Dante Hall; Mike Golic; Kurt Warner; Marcel Reece; James Lofton; Ryan Harris; Mike Mayock; Derek Rackley; Ryan Leaf; Isaac Bruce; Ben Leber; Christian Scotland-Williamson; Torry Holt	Laura Okmin; Ross Tucker; Taylor Davis; Ryan Leaf; Olivia Dekker; AJ Ross; Aditi Kinkhabwala; Mike Golic; Amber Theoharis; Jody Jackson; Ben Leber; Derek Rackley	Hall of Fame Game, National Thursday, Sunday and Monday night regular season games, NFL International Series, Thanksgiving, Black Friday game, late-season Saturday games, NFL playoffs, Pro Bowl and the Super Bowl
Football Sunday on ESPN Radio	Steve Levy; Jorge Sedano; Chris Carlin	Sal Paolantonio; Kelly Stouffer; Darius Butler; Mike Tannenbaum; Harry Douglas; Tom Ramsey	Courtney Cronin; Lindsey Thiry; Marilyn Payne	National Sunday afternoon and evening regular season games

Note: In the event of a scheduling conflict, NFL Network can also use other NFL personalities.

=== Other national broadcasters ===
Network	Play-by-play	Analyst	Sideline Reporter	Notes
NFL on CBS	Ian Eagle	Ross Tucker (color); Gene Steratore (rules)	Evan Washburn	Regional and select national Sunday afternoon regular season games, NFL playoffs (No. 2 broadcast team)
NFL on Fox	Joe Davis	Greg Olsen (color); Mike Pereira or Dean Blandino (rules)	Pam Oliver	Regional and select national Sunday afternoon regular season games, NFL playoffs (No. 2 broadcast team)
NFL on CBS	Kevin Harlan	Trent Green (color); Gene Steratore (rules)	Melanie Collins	Regional Sunday afternoon regular season games (No. 3 broadcast team)
NFL on Fox	Adam Amin	Drew Brees (color); Mike Pereira or Dean Blandino (rules)	Kristina Pink	Regional Sunday afternoon regular season games (No. 3 broadcast team)
NFL on CBS	Andrew Catalon	Logan Ryan (color); Gene Steratore (rules)	AJ Ross	Regional Sunday afternoon regular season games (No. 4 broadcast team)
NFL on Fox	Kenny Albert	Jonathan Vilma (color); Mike Pereira or Dean Blandino (rules)	Megan Olivi	Regional Sunday afternoon regular season games (No. 4 broadcast team)
NFL on CBS	Spero Dedes	Adam Archuleta (color); Gene Steratore (rules)	Aditi Kinkhabwala	Regional Sunday afternoon regular season games (No. 5 broadcast team)
NFL on Fox	Kevin Kugler	Daryl Johnston (color); Mike Pereira or Dean Blandino (rules)	Allison Williams	Regional Sunday afternoon regular season games (No. 5 broadcast team)
NFL on CBS	Tom McCarthy	Robert Turbin (color); Gene Steratore (rules)	Tiffany Blackmon	Regional Sunday afternoon regular season games (No. 6 broadcast team)
NFL on Fox	Chris Myers	Mark Schlereth (color); Mike Pereira or Dean Blandino (rules)	Jen Hale	Regional Sunday afternoon regular season games (No. 6 broadcast team)
ESPN2 (Manningcast)	Peyton Manning and Eli Manning	Various guests	None	Select national Monday night regular season games (simulcast of ESPN/ABC with alternate commentary)
NFL on Nickelodeon	Nate Burleson	Spongebob characters	Dylan Schefter and/or Young Dylan	Select games (simulcast of CBS with alternate commentary)
NFL on Prime Video (Thursday Night Football)	Sam Schwartzstein	None	None	Prime Vision Next Gen Stats (Simulcast of Prime Video with alternate commentary)
Additional talent
NFL on ESPN/NFL on ABC (Monday Night Football)	Dave Pasch; Bob Wischusen	Kurt Warner; Jason Kelce; Louis Riddick	Molly McGrath; Peter Schrager	
NFL on CBS	Chris Lewis; Beth Mowins	Luke Kuechly	Amanda Balionis	
NFL on Fox	Tim Brando; Mark Followill; Eric Collins	Matt Millen; Brady Quinn; Robert Griffin III	Sarah Kustok	
NFL on NBC (NBC Sunday Night Football)	Noah Eagle	Todd Blackledge; Jason Garrett	Kaylee Hartung; Kathryn Tappen	

=== Spanish national broadcasters ===
All regular-season and playoff games, as well as some preseason games, are available in Spanish.

Network	Lead Play-by-play	Lead Analyst	Lead Sideline Reporter	Notes
NFL on CBS using SAP function	Armando Quintero, Benny Ricardo, Nelson Fernández, Halim Zadat, José Antonio Melian, Jerry Olaya, Roberto Abramowitz.	—N/a	—N/a	National Sunday afternoon and evening games
NFL on Fox using SAP function	Francisco X. Rivera, Jessi Losada, Adrian Garcia Marquez, Luis Rodríguez, Eduardo Blancas, Pepe Mantilla, Fernando González.	—N/a	—N/a	National Sunday afternoon and evening games
NFL on Fox on Fox Deportes	José Pablo Coello	Raúl Allegre; Carlos Rosado	Lorena Troncoso	Selected Sunday evening, Thanksgiving Day and playoff games
NBC Sunday Night Football on Telemundo or Universo	Miguel Gurwitz	Rolando Cantú	Diego Arrioja (selected games only)	National Sunday night games
NBC Sunday Night Football using SAP function	René Giraldo	Édgar López	Diego Arrioja (selected games only)	National Sunday night games
Monday Night Football on ESPN Deportes or using SAP on ABC	Rebeca Landa	Sebastian Martinez-Christensen	Katia Castorena; John Sutcliffe	National Monday night games
Thursday Night Football using SAP on Amazon Prime Video	Miguel Gurwitz	Rolando Cantú	—N/a	National Thursday night games
NFL on Netflix using SAP	Miguel Gurwitz; Enrique Garay	Rolando Cantú; Raúl Allegre	—N/a	Christmas Day games, NFL Melbourne game, Thanksgiving Eve game, and one Week 18 game

== International broadcasters ==
=== Worldwide ===
Network	Lead Play-by-play	Lead Analyst	Notes
NFL Network International	Ian Eagle	Charles Davis	Super Bowl English language coverage only
ESPN International	Dave Pasch	Louis Riddick and Dan Orlovsky	Super Bowl English language coverage only (Australasia only)

Network	Notes
NFL Game Pass International on DAZN	Super Bowl Original US feed globally, except US & China

=== Americas ===
- Brazil:

Network	Play-by-play	Analyst	Sideline Reporter	Notes
ESPN Brasil	Renan do Couto, Ari Aguiar, Thiago Alves, Matheus Suman, Otávio Augusto, Conrado Giulietti	Paulo Antunes, Eduardo Zolin, Weinny Eirado, Rafael Belattini, Deivis Chiodini, Pepê Narduchi, Guilherme Cohen (rules), Giane Pessoa (rules)	Conrado Giulietti (selected games); Karize Brum	Sunday afternoon, Monday night, AFC playoff games and the Super Bowl with the Portuguese-language NFL Network International commentary (Pay TV). NFL RedZone on ESPN4. Also available in English on SAP.
Globo (TV Globo, SporTV, GE TV and Globoplay)	Everaldo Marques, Rodrigo Franco, Luiz Prota, Breno Monsef, Marcelo Ferrantini	Antony Curti, Pedro Pinto, Paulo Mancha, Alex Porto	—N/a	Thursday night, Sunday afternoon (2 weekly game), Sunday night, NFC playoff games and Super Bowl
Netflix	Luis Felipe Freitas, Matheus Ornellas	Pathy dos Reis, Raphão Martins	—N/a	Christmas Day games, NFL Melbourne game, Thanksgiving Eve game, and one Week 18 game

- Argentina: ESPN and Fox Sports
- Canada: CTV, TSN (English) and RDS (French)
- Mexico: ESPN, Fox, TelevisaUnivision
- Latin America (except Mexico and Argentina): ESPN
- Caribbean: ESPN and Rush Sports (English)
- Panama: COS

Network	Play-by-play	Analysts	Sideline Reporter	Notes
Fox	José Pablo Coello, Rodrigo Arana, Brenda Alvarado	Raúl Allegre, Carlos Rosado, Tyson López, Paco Bolivar, Jackson Ades, José Ramón Llaca	Lorena Troncoso (Thursday night)	Selected Sunday afternoon games, national Thursday night, Thanksgiving games. NFC Playoffs games + Pro Bowl + Super Bowl.
ESPN Latin America	Eduardo Varela (Monday night), Ciro Procuna (Sunday night), Sergio Dipp (NFL RedZone early window), Fernando Tirado (NFL RedZone late window)	Pablo Viruega (Sunday night and Monday night), Eitán Benezra (NFL RedZone early window), Miguel Ángel Briseño (NFL RedZone late window)	John Sutcliffe (Monday night)	National Sunday night, Monday night and NFL Network games + AFC Playoffs games + Super Bowl. NFL RedZone is broadcast on ESPN4. Games available in English using SAP or sometimes on ESPN3 as an independent feed.
Azteca	Enrique Garay	Joaquín Castillo, Eduardo Ruiz, Pablo de Rubens	Inés Sainz; Andrea Sola	Super Bowl only.
Televisa	Antonio de Valdés, Alfredo Tame, Ramon Aranza	Enrique Burak, Guillermo Schutz	Ernesto de Valdés	Selected Sunday afternoon games. Coverage of Mexico City Game, playoffs games + Super Bowl.

=== Europe ===
Country	Broadcasters
Andorra and Spain	DAZN: Kickoff game, Thursday Night Football, Sunday Night Football, two Sunday afternoon games, Monday Night Football, Thanksgiving games, playoff games and the Super Bowl. Mediaset España: Free, live coverage for select sunday afternoon, SNF, 4 Europe Games, 1 Thanksgiving Games, Select playoffs and Super Bowl on Cuatro or Mediaset Infinity Cayo TV: one Sunday afternoon game
Belgium, Luxembourg and Portugal	DAZN
Bosnia-Herzegovina, Croatia, Montenegro, North Macedonia, Serbia and Slovenia	Arena Sport
Bulgaria	Max Sport
Czech Republic and Slovakia	Nova Sport
Denmark	TV 2 Sport
Estonia, Latvia and Lithuania	Go3 Sport
Finland	Ruutu
France	L'Équipe (Free): 1 Sunday afternoon Game, 3 playoff games, Madrid Game, Munich Game in live and Paris Game in delay, Super Bowl. France TV (Free): Paris Game and London Games in live. beIN Sports (Pay): 2 sunday afternoon games, all prime time games (SNF, MNF, TNF), Paris Game, Thanksgiving Games, all Play off Games
Austria, Germany, Liechtenstein, Luxembourg and Switzerland	RTL (Kickoff Game, TNF, SNF, MNF, 2 exclusive Sunday Games, 1. exclusive Sunday Game on RTL+ Thanksgiving Games, European Internatiol Games, Playoffs and Super Bowl) (FTA) Rights until 2027/2028 Sky Sport (kickoff game, TNF, SNF, MNF, NFL Redzone, 2 exclusive Sunday Games, Thanksgiving, Playoffs and Super Bowl)
Greece	Cosmote Sport ERT (1 Sunday Game per week, Thanksgiving, 3 Playoff games and Super Bowl)
Hungary	Arena4
Iceland	Stöð 2 Sport
Ireland	Virgin Media Television: one Sunday afternoon game, three playoff games and the Super Bowl. Sky Sports: Selected regular season games, all NFL playoff games and the Super Bowl (simulcast with the American broadcasters). Also includes NFL RedZone on Sky Sports Mix.
Italy and San Marino	DAZN (Over-the-top): two Sunday afternoon games, SNF, MNF, TNF, most playoff games and the Super Bowl (Note: Using Italian-language NFL Network International commentary in Italy.) + NFL RedZone via NFL Network
Netherlands	ESPN
Norway	VG+
Poland	Polsat Sport – games of the week, Thanksgiving Day week game, Pro Bowl, postseason games and Super Bowl.
Romania	VOYO – streaming, exclusive for 3 seasons; some regular season games, playoffs & Super Bowl
Sweden	Disney+
Turkey	S Sport
United Kingdom	5/5Action: Two Sunday afternoon games, London and Dublin games, Thanksgiving Day specials, three playoff games and the Super Bowl. Sky Sports: Selected regular season games, all NFL playoff games and the Super Bowl (simulcast with the American broadcasters). Also includes NFL RedZone on Sky Sports Mix.

=== Africa ===
Country	Broadcasters
Sub-Saharan Africa	ESPN: Thursday Night Football, Sunday Night Football, Two Sunday afternoon games and Monday Night Football. All play-off games.

=== Asia ===
Country	Broadcasters
China	Tencent (over-the-top on PC, mobile and television): Seven live games per week, including Thursday Night Football, Sunday afternoon games (four), Sunday Night Football and Monday Night Football, as well as NFL RedZone, all playoff games and the Super Bowl. SMG Great Sports channel (regional over-the-air television rights in Shanghai (Note: The channel itself is currently unavailable through free over-the-air television, only available on cable and IPTV in Shanghai.)); GDTV Sports channel (regional over-the-air television rights in Guangdong Province)
Hong Kong	now Sports
Indian subcontinent	Star Sports
Indonesia	Vidio (over-the-top): Live broadcasts of regular season with six games a week as well as the NFL playoffs (simulcast live with the American broadcasters) and the Super Bowl (using English-language NFL Network International commentary).
Japan	Nittele G+ (satellite and cable): Live broadcasts of regular season up to three games per week, as well as all playoff games and the Super Bowl
Philippines	Premier Sports (pay): Live broadcasts of Thursday Night Football, Sunday Night Football and Monday Night Football games, all playoff games (including the Super Bowl with the English-language NFL Network International commentary) using American commentary at 8 am PST. Disney+: Thursday Night, three Sunday afternoon games, Sunday Night and Monday Night.
Singapore	StarHub TV (pay): Live broadcasts of regular season with five games a week as well as the NFL playoffs (simulcast live with the American broadcasters) and the Super Bowl (using English-language NFL Network International commentary).
South Korea	Coupang Play: Live broadcasts of regular season games as well as NFL playoffs, Pro Bowl and the Super Bowl (using NFL Network International feed in Korean commentary) at 3-10 am KST; MBC Sports+
Taiwan	ELTA Sports (Chunghwa Telecom MOD and over-the-top via ELTA.tv & Hami Video)
Thailand	AIS Play

=== MENA ===
Country	Broadcasters
Middle East and North Africa	beIN Sports: Thursday night, Sunday night and two Sunday afternoon games. Playoffs and Super Bowl.

=== Oceania ===
Country	Broadcasters
Australia	ESPN: Up to six live games per week including Thursday, Sunday and Monday Night Football, all playoff games and the Super Bowl. Seven Network: Three live games per week includes Sunday Night Football and all playoffs and Super Bowl (using American domestic broadcast commentary).
New Zealand	TVNZ: Two Sunday games live (Monday in NZ), one Sunday game delayed, and all playoffs and Super Bowl. ESPN: Thursday Night Football, Sunday Night Football, Three Sunday afternoon games and Monday Night Football. All play-off games.
Pacific Islands and Papua New Guinea	ESPN: Thursday Night Football, Sunday Night Football, Three Sunday afternoon games and Monday Night Football. All play-off games.

== See also ==
- NFL Network
- NFL Sunday Ticket
- NFL on television
- List of Super Bowl broadcasters
- List of current Major League Baseball broadcasters
- List of current Major League Soccer broadcasters
- List of current NBA broadcasters
- List of current National Hockey League broadcasters
