= Jacksonville Jaguars =

NFL team in Jacksonville, Florida

- Current season
Logo	Wordmark
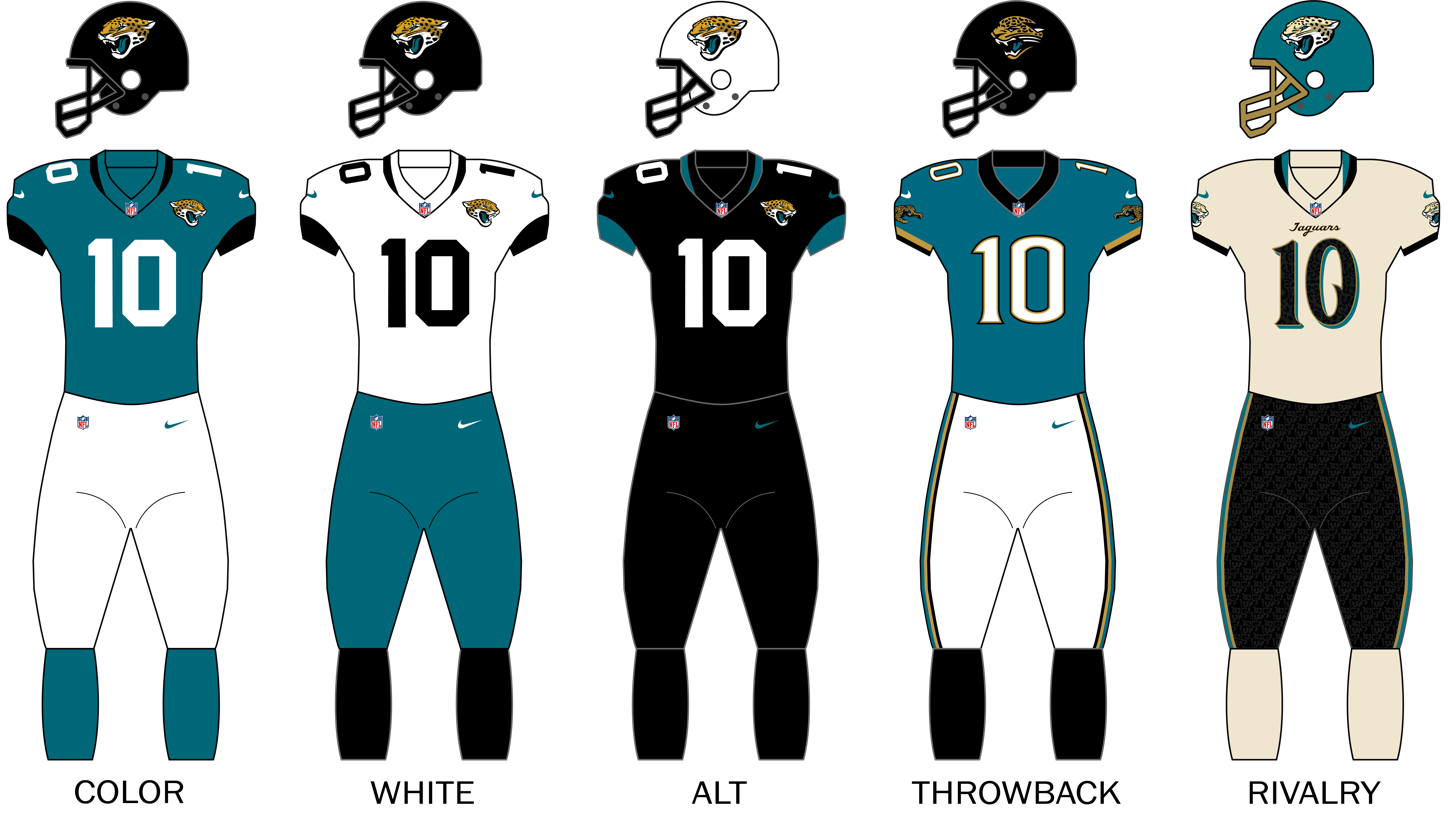
- Uniforms

General information
- Founded: November 30, 1993; 32 years ago
- Stadium: EverBank Stadium; Jacksonville, Florida
- Headquartered: EverBank Stadium; Jacksonville, Florida
- Colors: Teal, black, gold
- Mascot: Jaxson de Ville
- Website: jaguars.com

Personnel
- Owner: Shahid Khan
- General manager: James Gladstone
- Head coach: Liam Coen
- President: Mark Lamping

Nicknames
- The Jags; Sacksonville (2017)

Team history
- Jacksonville Jaguars (1995–present)

Home fields
- EverBank Stadium (1995–present)

League / conference affiliations
- National Football League (1995–present): American Football Conference (1995–present); AFC Central (1995–2001); AFC South (2002–present)

Championships
- Division championships: 5: AFC Central: 1998, 1999; AFC South: 2017, 2022, 2025

Playoff appearances (9)
- NFL: 1996, 1997, 1998, 1999, 2005, 2007, 2017, 2022, 2025

Owners
- Wayne Weaver (1993–2012); Shahid Khan (2012–present)

The Jacksonville Jaguars (colloquially known as the Jags) are a professional American football team based in Jacksonville, Florida. The Jaguars compete in the National Football League (NFL) as a member of the American Football Conference (AFC) South division. The team plays its home games at EverBank Stadium.

Founded alongside the Carolina Panthers in 1995 as an expansion team, the Jaguars competed in the AFC Central until they were moved to the AFC South in 2002. The franchise is owned by Shahid Khan, who bought the team from its original majority owner Wayne Weaver in 2012.

The Jaguars saw early success during their second through fifth seasons, which saw them make the playoffs each year, win two division titles, and appear in two AFC Championship Games. They are the youngest NFL expansion team to appear in a conference championship (by their second season in 1996, along with the Panthers) and clinch their conference's top seed (by their fifth season in 1999). The Jaguars have been less successful since, with only five playoff appearances and three division titles since 2000. They are one of four NFL franchises that have never played in the Super Bowl alongside the Cleveland Browns, Detroit Lions, and Houston Texans.

== History ==
=== Creation ===
In 1989, the prospective ownership group Touchdown Jacksonville! was organized with the intention of bringing an NFL franchise to Jacksonville. In 1991, the NFL announced plans to add two expansion teams. That same year, Touchdown Jacksonville! announced a bid for a team, and Jacksonville was ultimately chosen as one of five finalists, along with Charlotte, St. Louis, Baltimore, and Memphis. Charlotte was awarded the first franchise, which would become the Carolina Panthers, in October 1993. The decision for selecting the second expansion city was delayed a month. At the time, St. Louis was considered the favorite for the second franchise. However, the NFL owners voted 26–2 in favor of awarding the 30th franchise to Jacksonville. For their opening season in 1995, the Jaguars took part in the 1995 NFL expansion draft to help bolster their roster. The Jaguars, along with the Panthers, alternated picks from lists of unprotected players from existing franchises.

=== Tom Coughlin (1995–2002) ===
Tom Coughlin was hired to be the first head coach of the franchise on February 21, 1994. The Jaguars took part in their first NFL draft in 1995. Their first pick in franchise history was the second overall pick in the first round, which was used on eventual Hall of Fame offensive tackle Tony Boselli out of USC.

On September 3, 1995, the Jaguars played in their first regular season game, a 10–3 loss to the Houston Oilers. In Week 2, against the Cincinnati Bengals, Randy Jordan caught the first touchdown in franchise history, a 71-yard reception from quarterback Steve Beuerlein. The Jaguars would lose their first four games before breaking through against the Oilers in Week 5 in a 17–16 victory. Over the course of the season, they would suffer through a seven-game losing streak before closing the season out with a 24–21 win over the Cleveland Browns. The Jaguars went 4–12 in their first season. The team saw Mark Brunell and Steve Beuerlein both start games at quarterback.

Prior to their second season, the Jaguars drafted Kevin Hardy with the second overall pick in the first round of the 1996 NFL draft. The team also got Tony Brackens and Aaron Beasley in the draft. With Brunell leading at quarterback, the team improved in 1996. With the team sitting at 4–7, the Jaguars reeled off five straight wins to finish with a 9–7 mark, finish second in the AFC Central, and made the postseason for the first time. The team had two wide receivers go over 1,000 yards in Keenan McCardell and Jimmy Smith. The Jaguars won their first postseason game in franchise history with a 30–27 victory over the Buffalo Bills in the Wild Card Round. Following a 30–27 win over the Denver Broncos in the Divisional Round, the Jaguars saw their run end in the AFC Championship with a 20–6 loss to the New England Patriots.

The 1997 season saw the team go 11–5 and finish second in the AFC Central. McCardell and Smith once again both recorded over 1,000 receiving yards. The Jaguars qualified for the postseason, which was short-lived with a 42–17 loss to the Denver Broncos in the Wild Card Round. The 1998 season saw the team win their first divisional title by going 11–5. The team had their first ever player rush for over 1,000 yards, Fred Taylor. The team defeated the New England Patriots 25–10 in the Wild Card Round before falling to the New York Jets, 34–24 in the Divisional Round. The Jaguars reached new heights in the 1999 season with a franchise-best division-winning 14–2 season. The team defeated the Miami Dolphins, 62–7 in the Divisional Round, which would be Dan Marino's final game. The Jaguars saw their season end in the AFC Championship with a 33–14 loss to the Tennessee Titans, who were responsible for all three of their losses that year. Despite Taylor, McCardell, and Smith all putting together successful statistical seasons in 2000, the Jaguars took a step back and missed the postseason. The team slipped further in 2001 with a 6–10 record. In the 2002, the team went 6–10 once again and Coughlin was fired following the season.

=== Jack Del Rio (2003–2011) ===
The Jaguars hired Jack Del Rio to be the team's second head coach following the 2002 season. The Jaguars drafted quarterback Byron Leftwich with the seventh overall pick in the first round of the 2003 NFL draft. Leftwich would eventually replace Brunell as starting quarterback. The Jaguars went 5–11 in the 2003 season. One bright spot on the season was Taylor rushing for over 1,500 yards. The team improved to a 9–7 mark in 2004 but missed the postseason. In the 2005 season, Del Rio led the team back into the postseason with a 12–4 finish and 2nd-place finish in the AFC South. The return to the postseason was short-lived with a 28–3 loss to the New England Patriots in the Wild Card Round. The 2006 season saw the arrival of quarterback David Garrard. The Jaguars went 8–8 and missed the postseason. The 2007 season was an improvement to an 11–5 record and return to the postseason. The team defeated the Pittsburgh Steelers 31–29 in the Wild Card Round before falling to the New England Patriots 31–20 in the Divisional Round. The following year saw the team take a major step back with a 5–11 mark and last place finish in the division. In 2009, the team improved with a 7–9 mark but once again finished last in the division. In 2010, the team finished second in the division with an 8–8 mark but missed the postseason. The team used their first round draft pick (#10 overall) on Missouri quarterback Blaine Gabbert prior to the 2011 season. Following a 3–8 start, Del Rio was fired and Mel Tucker finished the year with a 2–3 mark as interim.

=== Mike Mularkey (2012) ===
Mike Mularkey was hired to be the Jaguars' third head coach prior to the 2012 season. The team went 2–14, which marked the worst season in franchise history at the time. Mularkey was fired following the season.

=== Gus Bradley (2013–2016) ===
Prior to the 2013 season, Gus Bradley was hired to be the team's fourth head coach. Chad Henne was the starting quarterback for the majority of the 2013 season, which saw the team go 4–12. Prior to the 2014 season, the Jaguars drafted Central Florida quarterback Blake Bortles with the third overall pick in the first round of the 2014 NFL draft. The change at quarterback did not see instant improvement as the team finished 3–13. The 2015 season saw the team finish 5–11. One bright spot was quarterback Blake Bortles passing for the most yards and touchdowns in franchise history with 4,428 and 35. Following a 2–12 start to the 2016 season, Gus Bradley was fired. Interim coach Doug Marrone split the final two games of the season.

Under Gus Bradley, the Jaguars earned just 14 wins in 55 games. At the time of his firing, Bradley's .341 winning percentage was the worst head coach winning percentage in the modern era of the NFL.

=== Doug Marrone (2017–2020) ===
Marrone was named the full-time head coach prior to the 2017 season. The 2017 season saw the Jaguars win the AFC South with a 10–6 mark being led by a strong defensive unit. The season marked the first division title for the team since 1999. The team made the playoffs for the first time since the 2007 season. In the Wild Card Round, the Jaguars defeated the Bills 10–3. In the Divisional Round, they defeated the Pittsburgh Steelers 45–42. In their first AFC Championship since the 1999 season, they lost to the New England Patriots 24–20. The game featured a controversial defensive play where Myles Jack recovered a Patriots fumble and had a path for a touchdown but the play was blown dead.

The Jaguars were not able to capitalize on the success of the 2017 season in the following year. The 2018 team went 5–11 and featured Bortles getting benched later in the season. The Jaguars signed Super Bowl LII MVP quarterback Nick Foles prior to the 2019 season. However, Foles was lost for most of the season from a broken collarbone suffered in Week 1 against the Chiefs. The team turned to 2019 sixth-round draft pick Gardner Minshew, who filled in for most of the 6–10 season. The 2020 season was the worst season in the history of the franchise with a 1–15 mark. Minshew suffered multiple injuries to his throwing hand during the season, which forced Mike Glennon and Jake Luton to start at quarterback. Following the end of the 2020 season, Marrone was fired.

=== Urban Meyer (2021) ===
In what would become one of the most ill-fated coaching hires in NFL history, the Jaguars hired Urban Meyer to be the next coach of the team prior to the 2021 season. The team drafted Clemson quarterback Trevor Lawrence with the top overall pick in the 2021 NFL draft. Meyer was fired after a 2–11 start. He was only the fourth head coach since the AFL-NFL merger to not finish a full season. Darrell Bevell finished the year as interim with a 1–3 mark.

=== Doug Pederson (2022–2024) ===
Prior to the 2022 season, the Jaguars hired Super Bowl LII-winning coach Doug Pederson to be their next head coach. The team saw immediate improvement with a 9–8 record and a division title. The Jaguars defeated the Los Angeles Chargers 31–30 in the Wild Card Round. The game featured the third-largest comeback in NFL postseason history with the Jaguars trailing 27–0 at one point. The Jaguars' season ended with a 27–20 loss to the Kansas City Chiefs in the Divisional Round.

In the 2023 season, the Jaguars finished with a 9–8 mark once again but failed to qualify for the playoffs.

On January 6, 2025, Pederson was fired after three seasons with the team, during which the team was 22–29 (.431), with one playoff appearance.

=== Liam Coen (2025–present) ===
On January 24, 2025, the Jaguars hired former Tampa Bay Buccaneers offensive coordinator Liam Coen to be their new head coach. The Jags went 13–4 during the regular season, making Liam Coen the first rookie head coach to take a team from 4–13 the previous season to 13–4. The Jaguars won the AFC South and were the three-seed for the AFC playoffs. In the Wild Card Round, the Jaguars lost to the Buffalo Bills 27–24.

== Logos and uniforms ==
=== Logos ===
The day after the NFL awarded the expansion team to Jacksonville, Jaguars owner Wayne Weaver held up the Jaguars' proposed silver helmet and teal jersey at the NFL owners' meeting in Chicago. The team's colors were to be teal, gold, and silver with black accents. However, this jersey and helmet design, with a gold leaping jaguar, created controversy. Ford Motor Company, then-parent of the automaker Jaguar, believed that the Jaguars' logo bore too much resemblance to the automaker's logo. Though no lawsuit was brought to trial, lawyers from the team and the automaker negotiated an ultimately amicable agreement whereby Jaguar would be named the official car of the Jaguars, and the Jaguars would redesign their uniforms.

The new logo was a snarling jaguar head with a teal tongue, which Weaver said was his wife's touch. He also claimed that the teal tongue came from "feeding Panthers to our Jaguars" — an obvious jab at their expansion brethren. During the Jaguars' first-ever preseason game teal-colored candies were handed out to all the fans who attended, turning their tongues a teal color just like on the logo. Additionally, raspberry lollipops were handed out by the "Candy Man" in section 142 to also turn the home fans' tongues teal.

In 2009, Weaver announced that he wanted to "clean up" the team's image. This meant the elimination of the full-body crawling Jaguar logo, the clawing Jaguar, and the two previous wordmarks which bent the text around these logos.

In February 2013, Jaguars owner Shahid Khan, who had acquired the team in late 2011, introduced a new brand identity for the team that included a new logo, wordmark, and secondary logo. The new Jaguar head logo was intended to be "fiercer" and more realistic. The secondary logo incorporated the new Jaguar head logo along with the first official usage of the team's popular nickname "Jags". The two images were encased in a shield-style shape, designed to be a tribute to Jacksonville's military community.

Beginning in 2013, the Jaguars began to feature gold more prominently than in the past. From 2009 to 2012, gold had only been used in the team logo and as a minor accent color.

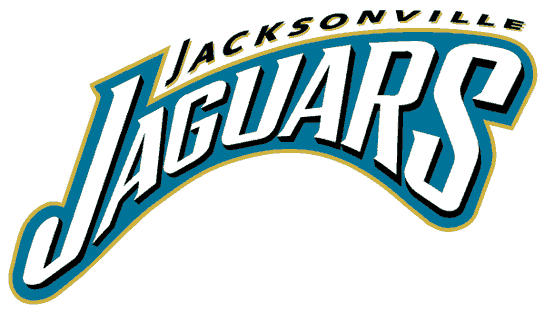
Jaguars wordmark logo (1995–1998)

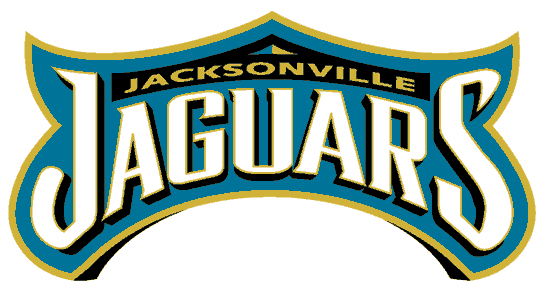
Jaguars wordmark logo (1999–2008)

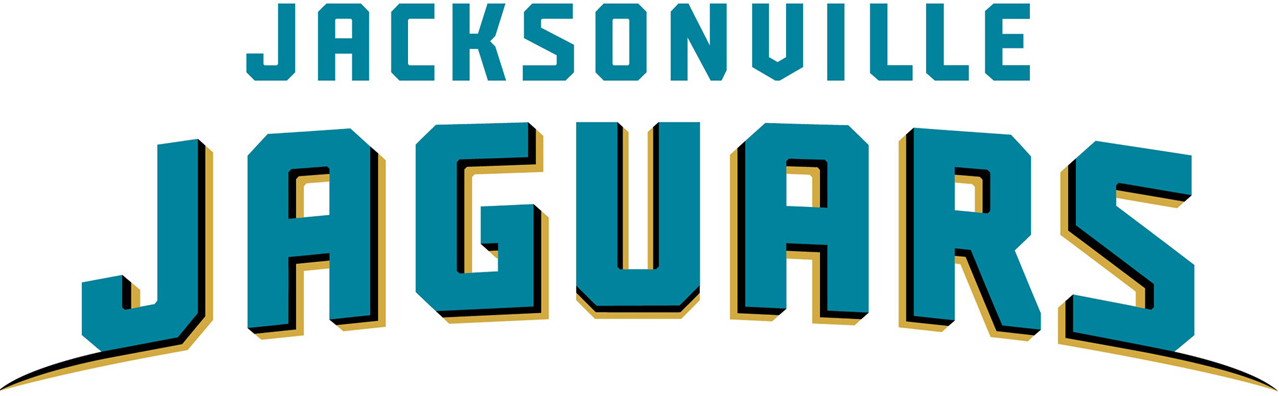
Jaguars wordmark logo (2009–2012)

Jaguars wordmark logo (2013–present)

=== Uniforms ===
For most of their history, the Jaguars have done what many other NFL teams located in subtropical climates traditionally practice: wear their white jerseys at home during the first half of the season — forcing opponents to wear their dark ones under the sweltering autumns in Jacksonville. The only exceptions were in 2004, 2008–2010, and 2025 when the Jaguars chose to wear teal for all home games. In the preseason, the Jaguars typically wear teal at home, since these games are played at night when there is very little advantage with the heat.

==== 1995–2001 ====
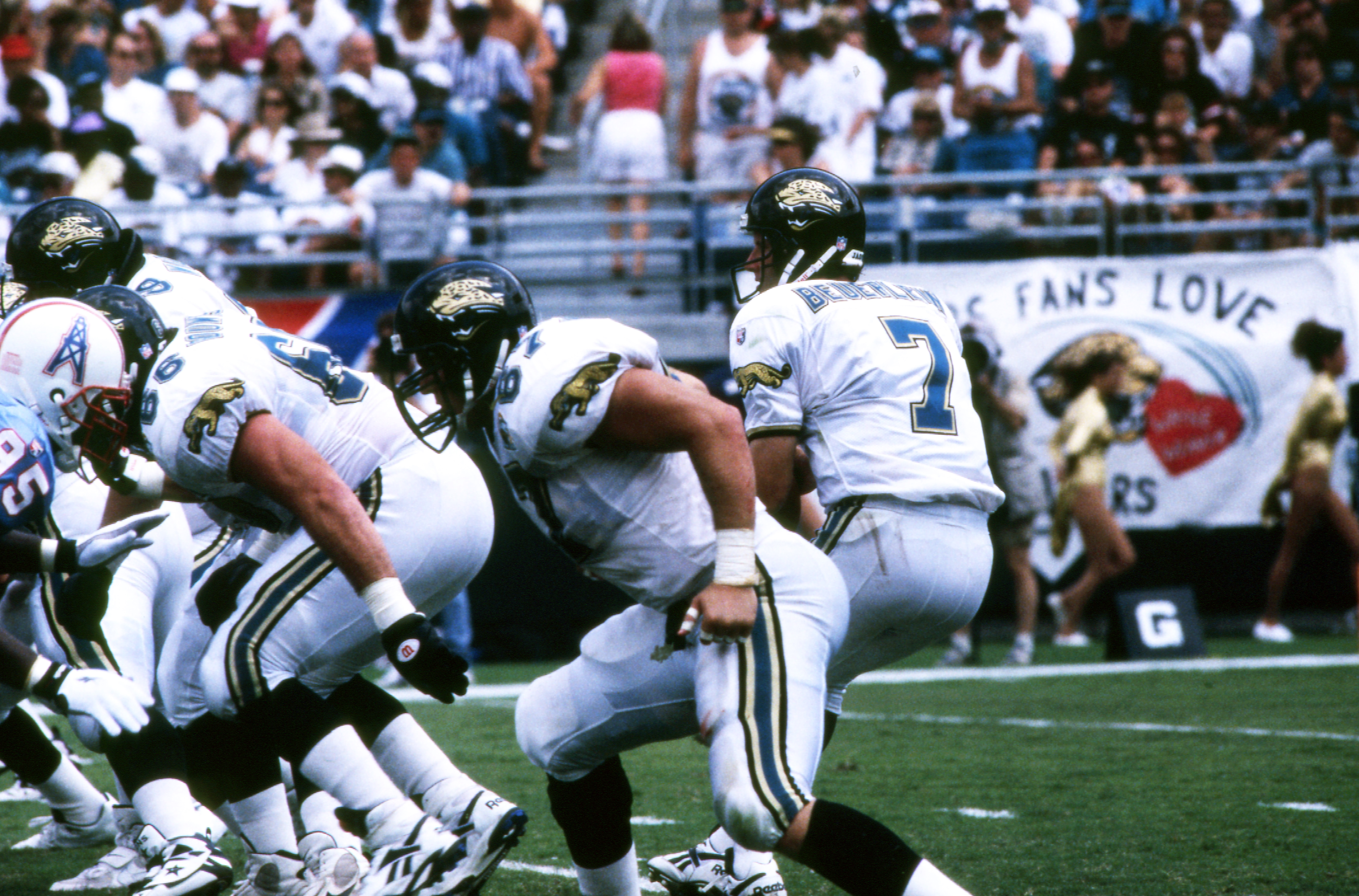
Jaguars' first home game in 1995

Following the logo change, the redesigned uniforms featured an all-black helmet, white pants with teal, black, and gold stripes, and numbers with gold inner trim and black outer trim. The home jersey was teal with white numbers and the away jersey was white with teal numbers. Both jerseys had a black collar and no sleeve stripes.

A prowling jaguar on each sleeve replaced the leaping jaguar going across both shoulders in the original design. The Jaguars in 1995 were the first NFL team to have two-tone borders on their numbers and lettering, and the first NFL team to show a complex logo (the crawling jaguar) on the sleeve.

Minor modifications were introduced to the Jaguars uniform during this time, most notably the font of the jersey numbers, replacing the original block numbers with a unique font. Two stripes were also added to the end of the sleeves below the prowling jaguar.

==== 2002–2008 ====
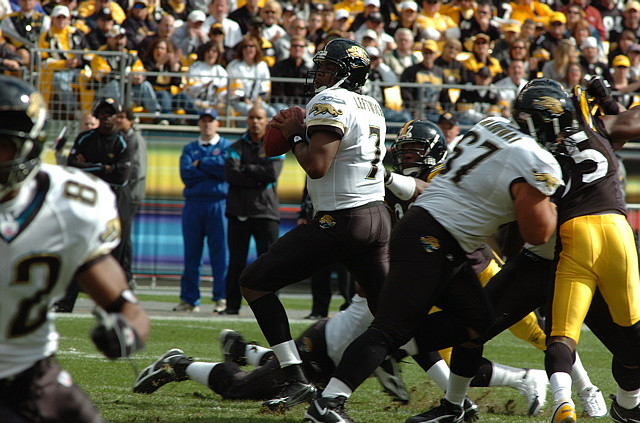
Jaguars away in Pittsburgh in 2005

The team introduced a black alternate jersey in 2002. During that same year, the team also introduced alternate black pants, worn with either the white or the teal jersey. After the black pants were introduced, the white pants would only be seen for the first few games of the year, presumably due to the heat. The black pants originally included two teal stripes down each side. The fan reaction to the extra black in the alternate jersey and alternate pants was positive, so in 2004 the Jaguars went through a formal uniform change, which teams are only allowed to do once every five years. These changes were mostly to the away look. Before 2004, the white away jerseys had teal numbers with black and gold trim, but after, the white jerseys had black numbers with teal and gold trim. The black pants were also changed. The teal stripes were replaced with the jaguar logo on each hip. Teal almost disappeared from the away uniform.

The stripes on the white pants were altered in 2008 so that the center, thickest stripe was black, and its accents were teal. In the 2008 year, the gold in the uniforms noticeably shifted from a bright yellow metallic appearance to more beige.

==== 2009–2012 ====
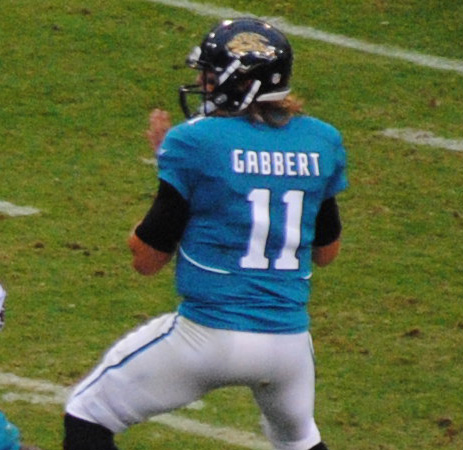
Jaguars home game in 2011

The Jaguars unveiled new uniforms for the 2009 season. Team owner Wayne Weaver reportedly wanted to "clean up" the look, feeling that the team had too many uniform styles. The new uniforms were introduced in a press conference on April 22.

At this press conference, Weaver elaborated that different people had taken different liberties with the Jaguars' image over the years, singling out the "all black" look which the team wore for every prime-time home game from 2003 to 2007 as a point of regret. He also said that the team would wear their teal jerseys at home even on hot days, saying that the practice of choosing to wear white on hot days had also diluted the team's image. The new uniform reflected a simpler look overall. The collar and sleeve ends are the same color as the rest of the jersey. The crawling jaguar was removed. The numbers on the jerseys were changed to a simpler, block font with a thicker, single color border. After all of these subtractions, two features were added. The first was a "Jaguars" wordmark underneath the NFL insignia on the chest. The second was two thin "stripes" of off-color fabric which were added to each midseam of the jersey, curling up to the neckline on the front and below the number on the back. The stripe on the home jersey is a white line next to a black line, matching the color of the numbers, and the stripe on the away jersey is a black line next to a teal line, again matching the numbers. The pants have similar stripes, both for the home and away uniform. The away uniforms were still black pants and numbers on a white jersey, but they now used teal as the only accent color as opposed to using gold in previous years. The Jaguars' identity, in terms of colors, beginning in 2009 is exclusively teal and black, with gold only being used in the logo. The final change made to the Jaguars' uniforms in 2009 was to the helmet. The new helmet and facemask were black just like the old ones, but when light hit the new ones a certain way, both the helmet and face mask sparkled with a shiny teal appearance. These were the first helmets in professional football which changed color with different angles of light. The logo and number decals also incorporated this effect.

Prior to the 2012 season, new Jaguars owner Shahid Khan announced that the team would once again use a black jersey, something they had not done since 2008. In September of that year, the team announced that it would use the black jersey and black pants as their primary home uniform. The teal jersey was resurrected as an alternate.

==== 2013–2017 ====
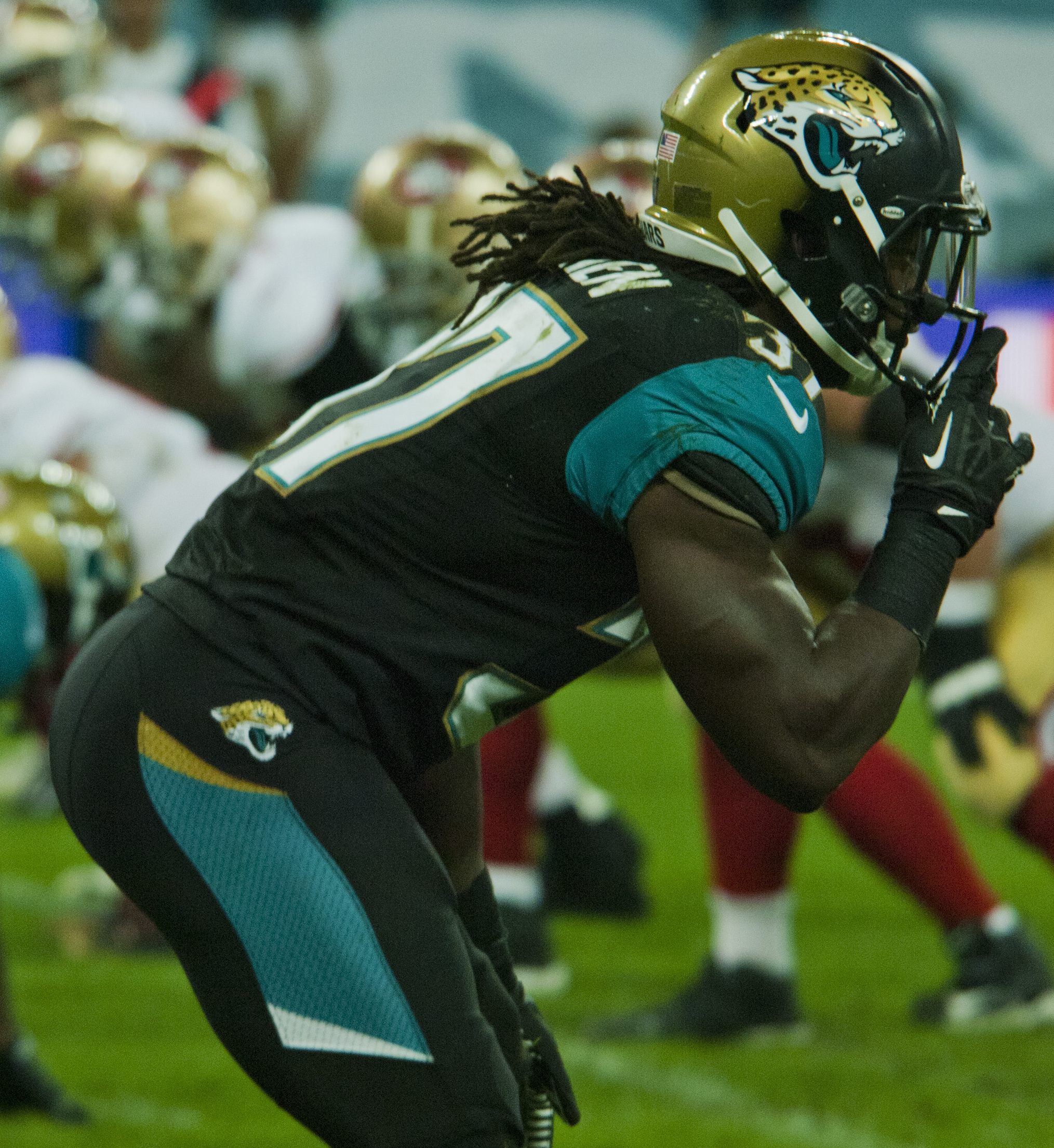
Jaguars home game in 2013

On April 23, 2013, the Jaguars unveiled new uniforms designed by Nike. The primary home jersey is black with white numerals outlined in teal and gold. The road jersey is white with teal numerals outlined in black and gold, marking the first time since 2003 that the team has used teal numbers on their road jersey. The alternate jersey is teal with black numerals outlined in white and gold. The team had never before used black numbers on their teal jersey. All three jerseys feature a contrasting stripe that bends around the neck, and semi-glossy patches on the shoulders meant to resemble claw marks. The team added their new shield logo onto a patch just above the player's heart, meant to pay tribute to Jacksonville's military heritage.

The helmet, first of its kind in the NFL, featured a glossy gold finish in the back that fades to matte black in the front, via a color gradient.

The new uniform set includes black and white pants with the Jaguars logo on the hip and a tri-color pattern down the player's leg.

In November 2015, as one of eight teams participating in Nike's "Color Rush" initiative for four games of Thursday Night Football during the 2015 season, Jacksonville introduced an all-gold second alternative uniform. The set features a gold jersey with black sleeves and black trim, as well as all gold pants. The white front and back numbers are lined in the teal accent color and bordered by black. The TV numbers on the shoulders are white with black bordering. The set also features gold undershirts and socks.

==== 2018–present ====
On April 19, 2018, the Jaguars again revealed re-designed uniforms. The new design returns to an all-black gloss helmet and removes many of the complicated details from the previous set. For the first time, there are no borders at all on any of the jersey numbers. There are no stripes or team logo on the pants; only an NFL logo and a Nike logo, which is the first and only of its kind in the NFL. Like the 2009 uniform set, the only gold in the uniform set belongs to the jaguar logo itself, and the block number font is not distinct from that used by other teams. The sleeve trim and collar trim are both a different color than the rest of the jersey, that and the solitary jaguar logo are the only distinct markings on the jersey. For the first time, the sock has a teal stripe between the black and white. The black jersey is the primary, as it has been since 2012, and the teal is the alternate. The Jaguars continued to pair the uniforms with either black or white pants, but added alternate teal pants for the first time.

In 2019, the Jaguars began wearing either solid black or white socks as part of a new NFL mandate allowing solid-colored hosiery on the field.

In Week 3 of the 2020 season against the Miami Dolphins, the Jaguars wore an all-teal ensemble for the first time, complete with solid teal socks.

On February 17, 2021, the Jaguars announced that the club would return to wearing teal jerseys as its designated primary home jersey color.

On July 18, 2024, the Jaguars unveiled throwback teal "Prowler" uniforms based on the style worn from 1995 to 2008. The number style used was similar to the one updated in the 1997 season. On July 25, the Jaguars unveiled a new white alternate helmet that would be worn with the alternate black jersey with white pants. In 2025, the Jaguars wore their "Prowler" throwbacks four times, meeting the new NFL minimum regarding the use of alternate or throwback uniforms in a season. As a result, both the white alternate helmet and black alternate uniform were not used that season.

On August 25, 2026, the Jaguars unveiled a "Rivalries" uniform which they would wear once per season at home against their AFC South opponents. Nicknamed "Bold City", the design featured a vintage white base on the uniform along with black pants accented with jaguar spots and teal and black stripes, and a teal helmet.

== Stadium ==
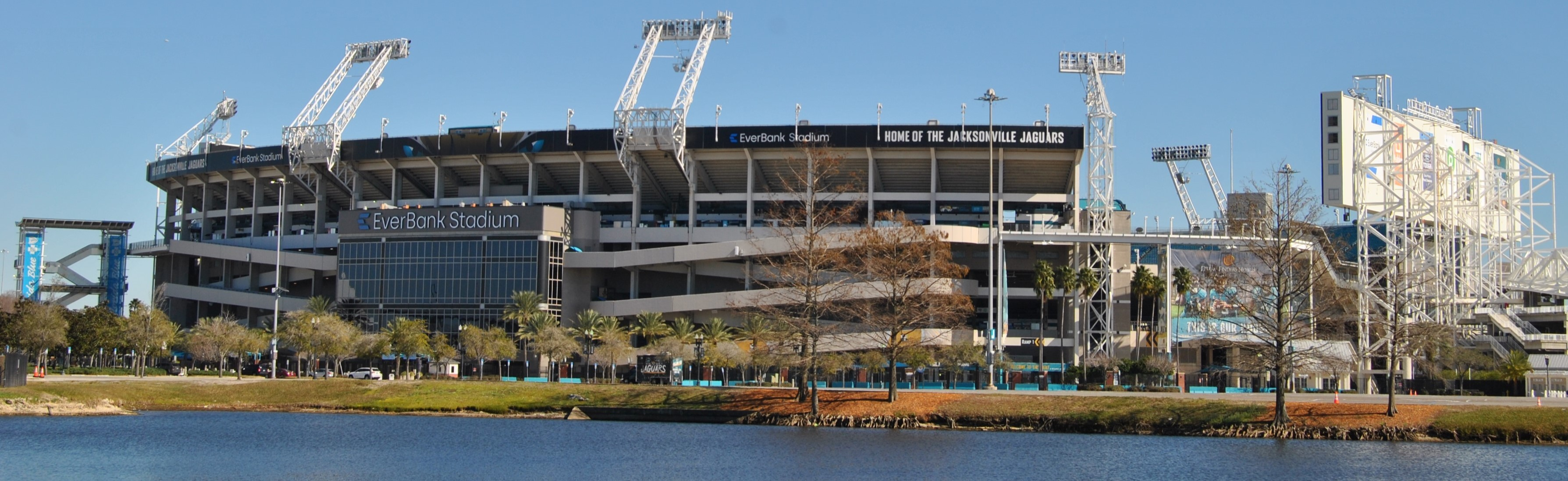
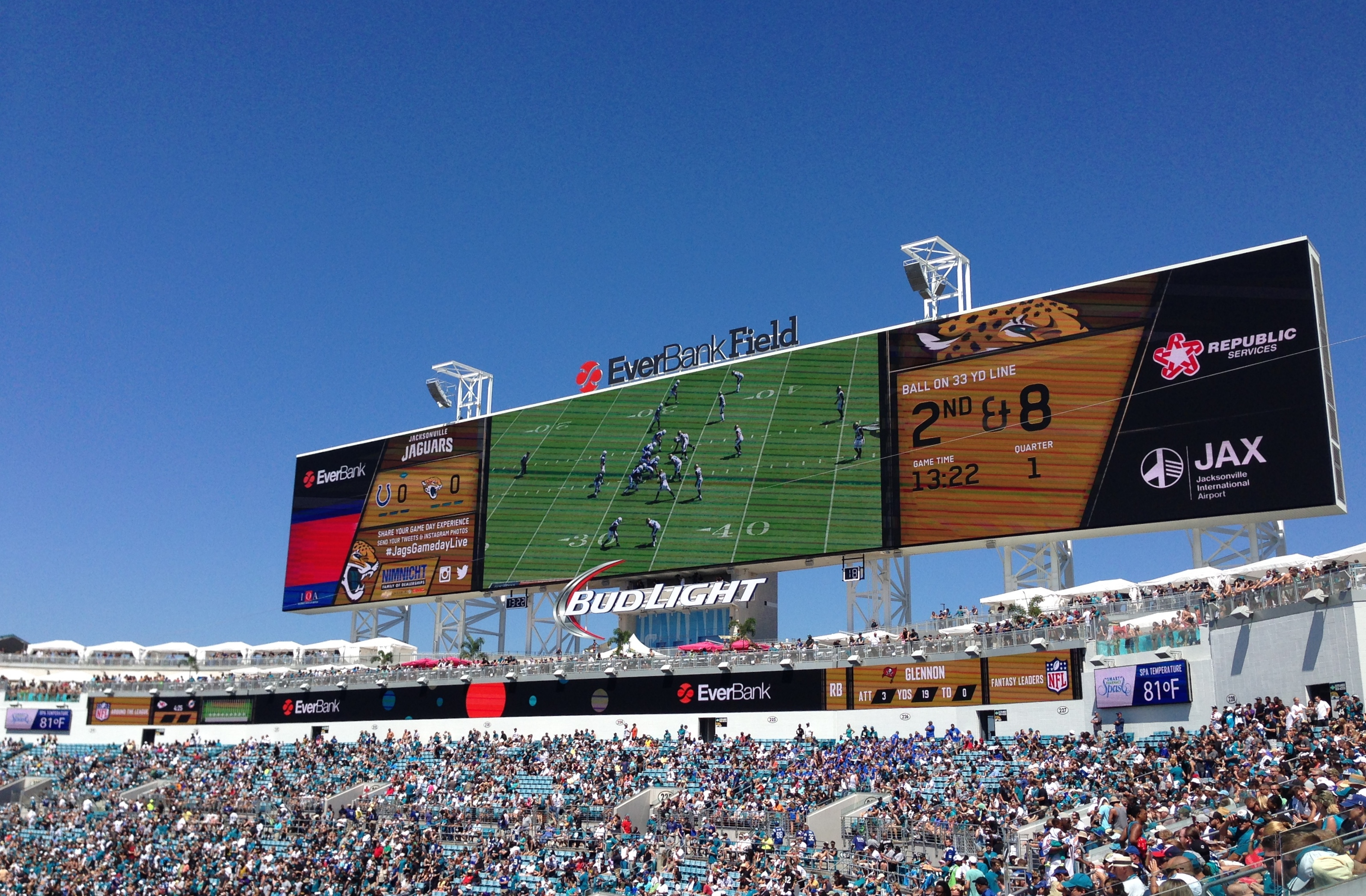
EverBank Stadium, home of the Jacksonville Jaguars and the world's largest scoreboards

EverBank Stadium (formerly known as Jacksonville Municipal Stadium, Alltel Stadium, EverBank Field, and TIAA Bank Field) is located on the north bank of the St. Johns River, and has been the home of the Jaguars since the team's first season in 1995. The stadium has a capacity of 67,814, with additional seating added during Florida–Georgia Game and the Gator Bowl.

The stadium served as the site of Super Bowl XXXIX in addition to five Jaguar playoff games including the 1999 AFC Championship Game. It also hosted the ACC Championship Game from 2005 to 2007 and the River City Showdown in 2007 and 2008.

From 1995 to 1997 and again from 2006 to 2009, the stadium was named Jacksonville Municipal Stadium. From 1997 to 2006, the stadium was referred to as Alltel Stadium. The naming rights were purchased by EverBank prior to the 2010 season. Prior to the 2018 season the Jaguars announced the stadium would be renamed TIAA Bank Field.

The stadium received a substantial upgrade in 2014 with the addition of new scoreboards, pools, cabana seating and premium seating that includes 180 field-level seats. The scoreboards are 60 feet (18 m) high and 362 feet (110 m) long. The new scoreboards are the world's largest video boards. Two 25 feet (7.6 m) by 12 feet (3.7 m) pools were installed in the north end zone along with the cabana seating. The cost of the stadium upgrades were $63 million, of which owner Shahid Khan helped finance $20 million.

Due to the renovation, capacity for EverBank Stadium will be reduced by over 20,000 during the 2026 season. The stadium will close after the 2026 season to construct the dome and facade. During the 2027 season, the Jaguars will play at Camping World Stadium in Orlando, Florida, before returning to the finished EverBank Stadium for the 2028 season.

== Rivalries ==
The Jaguars' main rivalries are with the other three teams in the AFC South: the Indianapolis Colts, Houston Texans, and Tennessee Titans. The Jaguars also have geographic rivalries with the two other Florida-based teams: the Miami Dolphins and Tampa Bay Buccaneers. The Jaguars, Dolphins, and Buccaneers frequently play each other during the preseason. During the AFC Central days of the mid-1990s and early 2000s, the Jaguars had a rivalry with the Pittsburgh Steelers as the two teams were consistently in playoff contention. The rivalry would reach new heights in the 2000s and 2010s when the Jaguars and Steelers joined the AFC South and North respectively. Jacksonville also defeated Pittsburgh in the playoffs in 2007 and 2017.

=== Divisional ===
==== Indianapolis Colts ====
The rivalry between the Jaguars and Indianapolis Colts is arguably one of the most heated in the AFC South. Both have been divisional rivals since the creation of the AFC South in the 2002 season. Despite often struggling to maintain competitive teams, the Jaguars have managed to achieve significant upsets against the Colts, securing more victories over them than over either the Texans or Titans. Since 2015 the Jaguars have maintained a home winning streak against the Colts, including a stretch between 2019 and 2022 where the team compiled a record of 6–30, with four of those victories occurring against the Colts.

==== Houston Texans ====
The Jaguars share a divisional rivalry with the Houston Texans. Both franchises are two of the youngest in the league, the two teams clashed particularly during Jacksonville's notorious "Sacksonville" era defenses while the Texans often fought hard for control of the division. The Texans currently lead the all-time series versus the Jaguars, 31–14.

==== Tennessee Titans ====
The Jaguars' rivalry with the Tennessee Titans dates back to the Jaguars inaugural season in the NFL prior to the 1995 season. when the Titans were then-known as the Houston Oilers. During the 1995 season, the Jaguars recorded their first win as a franchise over the Oilers in Houston. The rivalry intensified in the late 1990s as both teams were consistently near the top of the AFC Central standings. In 1999, the Jaguars posted a 14–2 record with both losses coming to Tennessee. The two teams met in the AFC Championship Game, with Tennessee beating Jacksonville for a third time that season, 33–14. The rivalry continued into the 2000s as both teams were placed in the newly formed AFC South in 2002. The Titans lead the overall series, 34–23, having also won the only playoff game in the series.

=== Conference ===
==== Miami Dolphins ====
The Jaguars have taken part in a minor rivalry with the Miami Dolphins as both teams are the only two AFC franchises located in Florida. The two teams first met during the 1998 NFL season on a Monday Night Football matchup. Both teams later met in the 1999 AFC Divisional Round in what would ultimately be the final career game for Dolphins' hall-of-fame quarterback Dan Marino. The Dolphins entered the game as heavy underdogs as they had finished the 1999 season 9–7, securing the lowest wild card berth. Meanwhile, the Jaguars had boasted an impressive 14–2 campaign under pro-bowl quarterback Mark Brunell, culminating in the Jaguars defeating Miami in a 62–7 blowout loss. The Jaguars managed an improbable upset victory during the 2021 season as the team had declined severely under controversial head coach Urban Meyer. Despite this, the Jaguars managed a comeback victory against the Dolphins in London during Week 6. The teams are tied 5–5 all time, though the Jaguars lead 1–0 in the postseason.

==== Buffalo Bills ====
A new rivalry emerged between the Jaguars and the Buffalo Bills after former Bills head coach Doug Marrone, who had quit the team after the 2014 season, was hired as a coaching assistant for Jacksonville and eventually rose to become the Jaguars' head coach. The first game between the Marrone led Jaguars was a London game in week 7 of the 2015 season which saw the Jaguars' win 34–31. The most important game of this part of the series was an ugly, low-scoring Wild Card game in 2017 that saw the Jaguars win 10–3. This game is notable as it was the first Bills playoff appearance in 17 seasons. Prior to this, Jacksonville had handed Buffalo its first playoff loss in Bills Stadium in 1996. Following the 2017 wild card game the Bills and Jaguars have met four additional times. The first was a "rematch" game in week 12 of the 2018 season which saw the Bills win 24–21. During this game trash talk from former Jaguars players such as Jalen Ramsey resulted in a brawl between the teams. The second time was in week 9 of the 2021 season. By this point, Marrone's feud with the Bills organization and the personal drama between Bills and Jaguars players no longer applied, as Marrone had been fired and replaced by Urban Meyer and all the players from the 2017 Jaguars team have since moved on to other teams or retired. Regardless, this game was the seventh largest upset at the time in NFL history which saw the 15.5-point favorite Bills lose 9–6. The Bills currently lead the series 11–10, but the Jaguars lead in postseason meetings 2–1.

== Statistics and records ==
=== Season-by-season results ===
This is a partial list of the Jaguars' last five completed seasons. For the full season-by-season franchise results, see List of Jacksonville Jaguars seasons.

Note: The finish, wins, losses, and ties columns list regular season results and exclude any postseason play.

Super Bowl champions (1970–present)	Conference champions	Division champions	Wild Card berth

As of February 8, 2026

Season	Team	League	Conference	Division	Regular season				Postseason results	Awards
Season	Team	League	Conference	Division	Finish	Wins	Losses	Ties	Postseason results	Awards
2020	2020	NFL	AFC	South	4th	1	15	0	—	—
2021	2021	NFL	AFC	South	4th	3	14	0	—	—
2022	2022	NFL	AFC	South	1st	9	8	0	Won Wild Card Playoffs (Chargers) 31–30; Lost Divisional Playoffs (Chiefs) 27–20	—
2023	2023	NFL	AFC	South	2nd	9	8	0	—	—
2024	2024	NFL	AFC	South	3rd	4	13	0	—	—
2025	2025	NFL	AFC	South	1st	13	4	0	Lost Wild Card Playoffs (Bills) 24–27	

== Current roster ==
Jacksonville Jaguars roster
Quarterbacks (QB): 10 Quinn Ewers; 16 Trevor Lawrence; Running backs (RB): 20 Ameer Abdullah; 5 LeQuint Allen; 24 Chris Rodriguez Jr.; 33 Bhayshul Tuten KR; Wide receivers (WR): 19 Josh Cameron; 12 Travis Hunter WR/CB; 3 Jakobi Meyers; 7 Brian Thomas Jr.; 11 Parker Washington PR; 18 CJ Williams; Tight ends (TE): 87 Nate Boerkircher; 88 Tanner Koziol; 80 Quintin Morris; 85 Brenton Strange	Offensive linemen (OL): 76 Ezra Cleveland G; 68 Daniel Faalele G; 73 Robert Hainsey C; 72 Walker Little T; 64 Wyatt Milum G; 60 Jonah Monheim C; 75 Emmanuel Pregnon G; 70 Cole Van Lanen T; Defensive linemen (DL): 91 Arik Armstead DT; 90 Jordan Davis DT; 93 Matt Dickerson DT; 94 Davon Godchaux DT; 41 Josh Hines-Allen DE; 99 Ruke Orhorhoro DT; 98 Albert Regis DT; 92 Danny Striggow DE; 57 Bryan Thomas Jr. DE; 44 Travon Walker DE; 97 Wesley Williams DE	Linebackers (LB): 50 Branson Combs; 47 Dennis Gardeck; 35 Jalen McLeod; 51 Ventrell Miller; 23 Foyesade Oluokun; 31 Jahlani Tavai; Defensive backs (DB): 0 Jessie Bates S; 1 Montaric Brown CB; 22 Jalen Huskey S; 6 Antonio Johnson S; 4 Jarrian Jones CB; 36 Jaylon Jones CB; 25 Rayuan Lane III S; 2 Jourdan Lewis CB; 26 Kaevon Merriweather S; Special teams (ST): 9 Logan Cooke P; 39 Cam Little K; 46 Ross Matiscik LS	Practice squad: 83 Brenden Bates TE; 96 T. J. Bollers DT; 79 Geron Christian T; 66 Eli Cox C; 54 Jamal Hill LB; 21 Alijah Huzzie CB; 55 Austin Johnson DT; 13 Tim Jones WR; 37 Jabbar Muhammad CB; 14 Nick Mullens QB; 56 BJ Ojulari DE; 86 Trebor Peña WR; 42 Cam'Ron Silmon-Craig S; 30 J'Mari Taylor RB; 81 Austin Trammell WR; 15 Michael Wortham WR; 78 Kilian Zierer T (IPP); Reserve: 45 Jared Bartlett LB (IR); 74 Garrett DiGiorgio G (IR); 58 Zach Durfee DE (IR/DFR); 95 B. J. Green DE (IR/DFR); 52 DaVon Hamilton DT (IR); 77 Anton Harrison T (IR/DFR); 53 Parker Hughes LB (IR); 65 Patrick Mekari G (IR/DFR); 29 Eric Murray S (IR); 69 Sam Mustipher C (IR); 27 Caleb Ransaw S (IR/DFR) 53 active, 16 practice squad (1 IPP), 11 reserve As of November 14, 2026. Rookies in italics.; Roster; Depth chart; Transactions

== Players of note ==
=== Pro Football Hall of Fame ===
Jacksonville Jaguars in the Pro Football Hall of Fame
Players
No.	Player	Position	Seasons	Inducted
71	Tony Boselli	OT	1995–2001	2022

=== Pride of the Jaguars ===
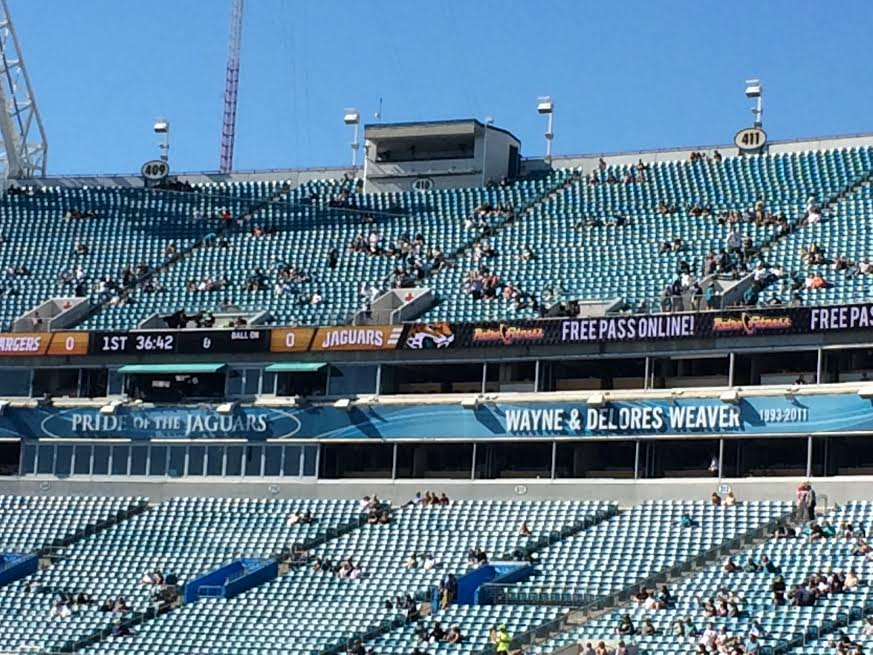
Pride of the Jaguars display in EverBank Stadium

A contest was held in July 2006 to name the club's ring of honor, "Pride of the Jaguars" was chosen with 36% of the vote. It was unveiled during the 2006 season during a game against the New York Jets on October 8. Former offensive tackle Tony Boselli was the first player inducted.

On January 1, 2012, team owner Wayne Weaver and his wife Delores were added to the Pride of the Jaguars in their final game before the sale of the team to Shahid Khan. On June 7, 2012, the Jaguars announced Fred Taylor would be the next inductee into the Pride of the Jaguars. He was inducted on September 30, 2012. Longtime Jaguars quarterback Mark Brunell was also inducted into the "Pride of the Jaguars" on December 15, 2013. Former wide receiver Jimmy Smith was inducted in 2016. On November 9, 2023, it was announced that former head coach Tom Coughlin would be inducted sometime during the 2024 season. During halftime of the Week 5 game against the Indianapolis Colts, Coughlin was officially inducted into the Pride.

Pride of the Jaguars
No.	Player	Position	Seasons	Inducted
71	Tony Boselli	OT	1995–2001	2006
—	Wayne and Delores Weaver	Owners	1993–2011	2012
28	Fred Taylor	RB	1998–2008	2012
8	Mark Brunell	QB	1995–2003	2013
82	Jimmy Smith	WR	1995–2005	2016
—	Tom Coughlin	HC	1995–2002	2024

=== Retired numbers ===
On October 9, 2022, the Jacksonville Jaguars retired Tony Boselli's number 71, at a halftime ceremony against the division-rival Houston Texans. It is the first number retired by the organization.

Jacksonville Jaguars retired numbers
No.	Player	Position	Seasons	Retired	References
71	Tony Boselli	OT	1995–2001	October 9, 2022	

Despite not being formally retired, the Jaguars have not reissued the numbers 8, 28, 63, or 82, worn by Mark Brunell, Fred Taylor, Brad Meester, and Jimmy Smith, respectively, since they retired or left the team. Additionally, Brunell and Smith are the only players in franchise history to have worn their respective numbers.

== Head coaches and coordinators ==
=== Head coaches ===
The Jaguars have had ten head coaches (including two interim coaches) throughout their franchise history. Their first head coach was Tom Coughlin, who compiled a 72–64 (.529) overall record with the team from 1995 to 2002. Jack Del Rio was the longest-tenured head coach in Jaguars history, holding the position from 2003 to 2011. Their current head coach is Liam Coen, who was hired on January 24, 2025.

=== Offensive coordinators ===
Name	Tenure
Kevin Gilbride	1995–1996
Chris Palmer	1997–1998
Bobby Petrino	2001
Bill Musgrave	2003–2004
Carl Smith	2005–2006
Dirk Koetter	2007–2011
Bob Bratkowski	2012
Jedd Fisch	2013–2014
Greg Olson	2015–2016
Nathaniel Hackett	2016–2018
John DeFilippo	2019
Jay Gruden	2020
Darrell Bevell	2021
Press Taylor	2022–2024
Grant Udinski	2025–present

=== Defensive coordinators ===
Name	Tenure
Dick Jauron	1995–1998
Dom Capers	1999–2000
Gary Moeller	2001
John Pease	2002
Mike Smith	2003–2007
Gregg Williams	2008
Mel Tucker	2009–2012
Bob Babich	2013–2015
Todd Wash	2016–2020
Joe Cullen	2021
Mike Caldwell	2022–2023
Ryan Nielsen	2024
Anthony Campanile	2025–present

== Current staff ==
Jacksonville Jaguars staff
Front office: Owner – Shahid Khan; President – Mark Lamping; Executive vice president of football operations – Tony Boselli; General manager – James Gladstone; Senior advisor to the general manager – Brian Xanders; Senior advisor to the general manager – JW Jordan; Director of college scouting – Brian Hill; Senior personnel executive – Regis Eller; Personnel executive – John Stevenson, Ricky Thomas Jr., Ryan Stamper; Director of pro scouting – DeJuan Polk; Senior director of football strategy and game management – Jon Dykema; Senior vice president of football analytics – Jake Temme; Director of player finance – Trip MacCracken; Chief football strategy officer – Tony Khan; Head coaches: Head coach – Liam Coen; Assistant head coach/Pass game coordinator – Shane Waldron; Associate head coach/Special teams coordinator – Heath Farwell; Offensive coaches: Offensive coordinator – Grant Udinski; Run game coordinator – Brian Picucci; Quarterbacks – Spencer Whipple; Running backs – Chad Morton; Wide receivers – Edgar Bennett; Assistant wide receivers – Tyler Tettleton; Tight ends – Richard Angulo; Offensive line – Shaun Sarrett; Pass game specialist – John Van Dam; Offensive assistant – Trevor Mendelson; Offensive assistant – Fred Walker	Defensive coaches: Defensive coordinator – Anthony Campanile; Defensive pass game coordinator – Mathieu Araujo; Defensive line – Matt Edwards; Assistant defensive line – Derrick LeBlanc; Linebackers – Tem Lukabu; Assistant linebackers – Kevin Wilkins; Defensive backs – Anthony Perkins; Assistant defensive backs – Drew Lascari; Defensive assistant – Grant Morgan; Senior defensive assistant – Bill Sheridan; Special teams coaches: Assistant special teams – Luke Thompson; Strength and conditioning: Head strength and conditioning coach – Eric Ciano; Assistant strength and conditioning coach – Paul Jackson; Assistant strength and conditioning coach – Lanier Coleman; → Coaching staff → Front office → More NFL staffs

== Culture ==
=== Mascot ===
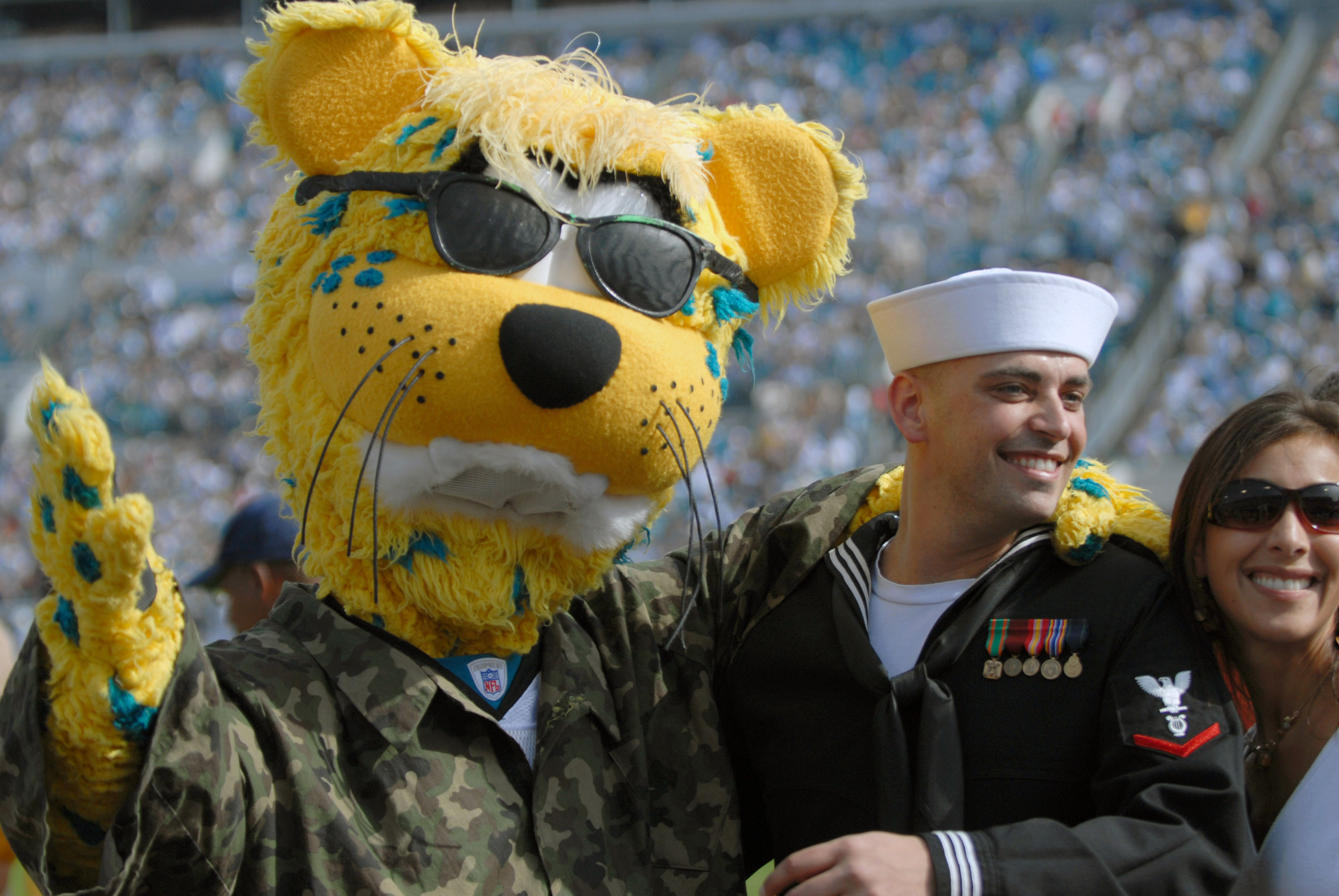
Jaxson de Ville with American Idol season 6 finalist Phil Stacey

Since his introduction in 1996, Jaxson de Ville has served as the Jaguars' mascot. Jaxson entertains the crowd before and during games with his antics. The mascot has established a reputation for making dramatic entrances including bungee jumping off the stadium lights, sliding down a rope from the scoreboard, and parachuting into the stadium.

Jaxson's antics got him into trouble in 1998 and stemmed the changing of the NFL's mascot rules, and also caused him to calm down. However, Jaxson was still seen, by some, as a mascot that gets in the way during the game. After the October 22, 2007, game against Indianapolis, Colts President Bill Polian complained to the NFL, and Jaxson was reprimanded again.

Jaxson's first appearance was on August 18, 1996, and was played by Curtis Dvorak from his inception until his retirement in June 2015.

=== Jacksonville Roar ===
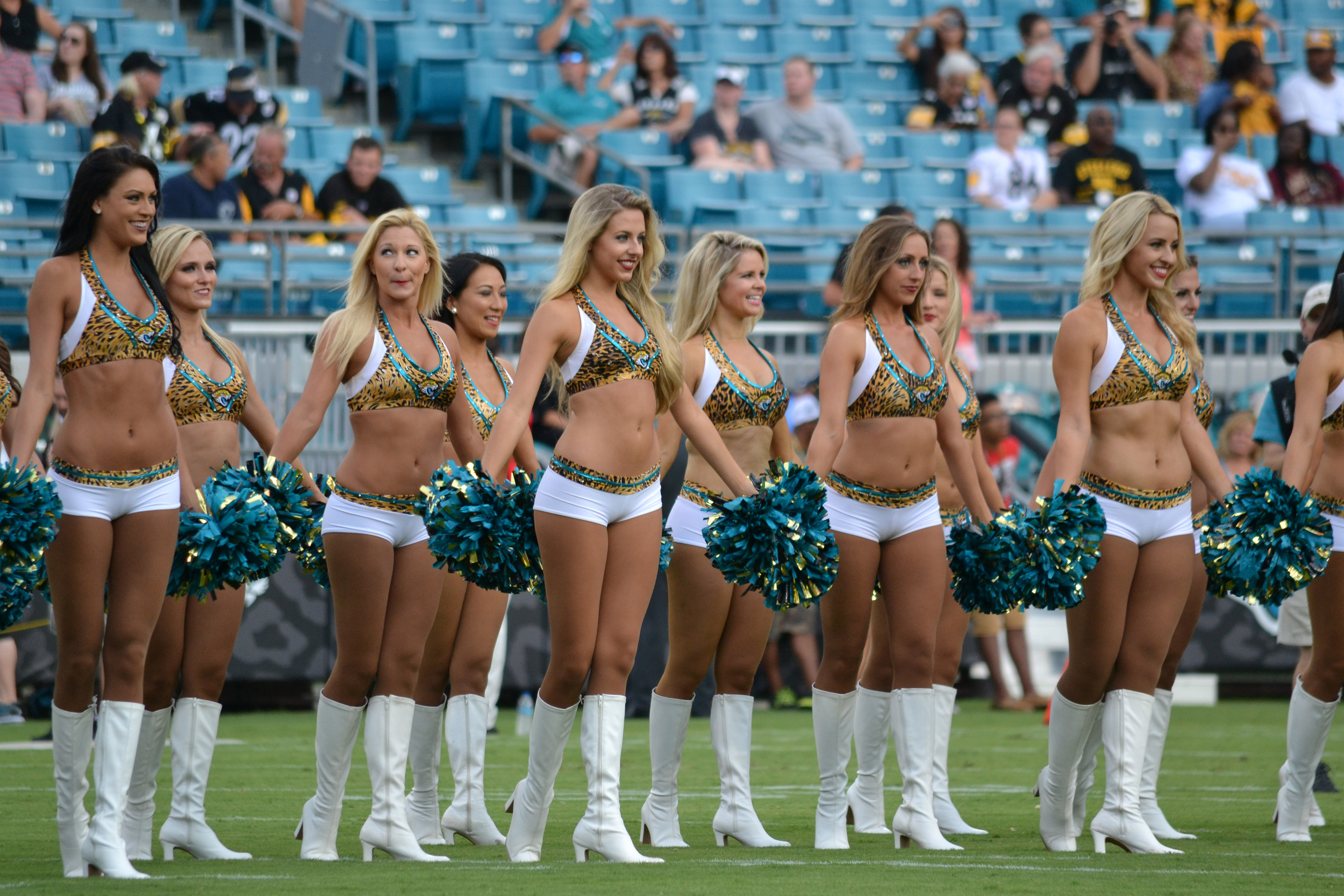
Jacksonville Roar in 2015.

The Jacksonville Roar is the professional cheerleading squad of the Jaguars. The group was established in 1995, the team's inaugural year, and regularly performs choreographed routines during the team's home contests.

In addition to performing at games and pep rallies, members function as goodwill ambassadors of the team, participating in corporate, community, and charitable events in the Jacksonville metropolitan area where they sign autographs and pose for pictures. They also join NFL tours to entertain American servicemen and women around the world.

=== Community work ===
The Jacksonville Jaguars Foundation was established in 1994, when the franchise deal was first announced. Since then, the Foundation has given over $20 million to area efforts in community improvement. The Foundation focuses on many initiatives, such as Honor Rows, anti-tobacco programs, NFL Play 60, and support for veterans. The Foundation grants over $1 million annually to organizations that assist "economically and socially disadvantaged youth and families".

The Jaguars' first head coach, Tom Coughlin, established the Tom Coughlin Jay Fund Foundation in 1996 to help young cancer victims and their families with emotional and financial assistance. The charity remained in Jacksonville after Coughlin left to coach the New York Giants.

== Broadcast media ==
=== Radio ===
From their inaugural 1995 season until 2013, the Jaguars' flagship radio station was WOKV, which simulcasts on both AM 690 and on 104.5 FM.

Starting with the 2014 season, the team moved their broadcast to WJXL and WJXL-FM (1010 AM and 92.5 FM) and simulcast on 99.9 Gator Country

Frank Frangie is the play-by-play announcer with former Jaguars players Tony Boselli and Jeff Lageman providing color analysis.

Jaguars Radio network affiliates
Market	Frequency	Call sign	Branding
Jacksonville	1010 AM & 92.5 FM	WJXL & WJXL-FM	1010XL
Jacksonville	99.9	WGNE-FM	99.9 Gator Country
St. Augustine	1420 AM	WAOC	ESPN Radio 1420
Orlando	1080 AM	WHOO	Sports Talk 1080 The Team
Melbourne	1240 AM	WMMB	New Talk WMMB
Lake City	94.3 FM	WNFB	Mix 94.3
Ocala	900 AM	WMOP	ESPN Radio
Port St. Lucie	1590 AM	WPSL	1590 WPSL
Gainesville	850 AM	WRUF	ESPN 850
Savannah, GA	1400 AM	WSEG	Star 1400
Brunswick, GA	107.7 FM	WHFX	107.7 The Fox
Jesup, GA	105.5 FM	WIFO-FM	Big Dog 105.5 Country
Waycross, GA	1150 AM	WJEM	The Jock 1150
Tallahassee	93.3 FM	WVFT	Talk Radio 93.3
Panama City	97.7 FM	WYYX	97X
Palm Coast	1550 AM	WNZF	WNZF Newsradio
Kingsland, GA	106.3 FM	WKBX	KBAY 106.3

=== Television ===
WJAX-TV or WFOX-TV televises all preseason games and also televises regular season games that are televised nationally on NFL Network and games streaming on Amazon Prime Video, Netflix, or YouTube.

Television affiliates
Market	Station	Notes
Jacksonville	WJXX	Monday Night Football Wild Card simulcast on ABC and games on ESPN
Jacksonville	WJAX-TV	CBS games, preseason games, games streaming on Netflix
Jacksonville	WFOX-TV	Fox games, preseason games, games aired on NFL Network, Prime Video, and YouTube.
Jacksonville	WTLV	NBC games
Orlando	WFTV	Preseason games and select Monday Night Football games.
Tallahassee	WTXL-TV	Preseason games and select Monday Night Football games
Gainesville	WNBW-DT	Preseason and NBC games
Savannah, GA	WSAV-TV	Preseason and NBC games
Dothan, AL	WTVY	Preseason and CBS regional/national games
Panama City	WJHG-TV	Preseason and NBC games
Valdosta/Albany, GA	WSWG	Preseason and CBS regional/national games
Charleston, SC	WTAT-TV	Preseason and Fox regional/national games
Mobile, AL-Pensacola	WPMI-TV	Preseason and NBC games

== See also ==
- List of Jacksonville Jaguars seasons
- Cultural significance of the jaguar in North America
