= WJXL =

WJXL can refer to:

- WJXL (AM), a radio station at 1010 AM licensed to Jacksonville Beach, Florida
- WJXL-FM, a radio station at 92.5 FM licensed to Jacksonville Beach, Florida
- WCKA, a radio station at 810 AM licensed to Jacksonville, Alabama, which held the call sign WJXL from 1987 to 1996
