= WNZF =

- Bunnell, Florida; United States
- Broadcast area: Flagler County, Florida
- Frequency: 1550 kHz
- Branding: WNZF Newsradio 1550 AM and 94.9 FM

Programming
- Format: News/talk
- Affiliations: Premiere Networks; Westwood One; Jacksonville Jaguars Radio Network; Fox Sports Radio; ABC News Radio

Ownership
- Owner: Flagler County Broadcasting, LLC
- Sister stations: WAKX; WBHQ; WBHU

History
- First air date: August 18, 2008
- Former call signs: WAYI (2005–2007)
- Call sign meaning: "News Flagler"

Technical information
- Licensing authority: FCC
- Facility ID: 134066
- Class: B
- Power: 5,500 watts day; 57 watts night
- Transmitter coordinates: 29°28′9″N 81°16′0″W
- Translator: 94.9 W235CW (Bunnell)
- Repeater: 92.7 WBHQ-HD2 (Beverly Beach)

Links
- Public license information: Public file; LMS
- Webcast: Listen Live
- Website: wnzf.com

WNZF (1550 kHz) is a commercial AM radio station, licensed to Bunnell, Florida, the county seat of Flagler County in Northeast Florida. The call sign stands for "News Flagler".

WNZF is licensed to Flagler County Broadcasting, LLC, which is owned by James Martin, Gary Smithwick, David Ayres, and Tricia Woods. Martin has owned and operated more than 20 radio stations. Smithwick is a Washington, D.C. communications attorney who has participated in ownership of five radio stations in Florida with Martin. Smithwick was also president and part owner of a television station.

WNZF has its transmitter off North Bay Street in Bunnell. It transmits 5,500 watts by day, but because AM 1550 is a clear channel frequency, WNZF must reduce power at night to 57 watts, to avoid interfering with other stations. WNZF is also heard on an FM translator, W235CW at 94.9 MHz.

== Programming ==
The station airs a local morning show weekdays; the rest of the weekday schedule is made up of syndicated shows from Clark Howard, Sean Hannity, Mark Levin, Coast to Coast AM with George Noory and Fox Sports Radio. Weekends include shows on health, money, real estate, and a syndicated home repair show with Gary Sullivan. Some weekend hours are paid brokered programming. In the fall, WNZF carries Flagler Palm Coast High School football and Jacksonville Jaguars NFL football. Most hours begin with ABC News Radio.

== History ==
The station first signed on the air on August 18, 2008. Prior to that, it was a construction permit issued to Flag Radio carrying the call sign WAYI. It received its current call letters, WNZF, after its sale to Flagler County Broadcasting, LLC. WNZF's application for program test authority was granted on August 18, 2008. Its license to cover was granted on November 10, 2008. WNZF was the first commercial radio station licensed to serve Flagler County.

Flagler County Broadcasting, LLC, also owns WBHQ in Beverly Beach, Florida, which broadcasts on 92.7 MHz. WNZF and WBHQ operate from the same studio complex in Bunnell. WNZF programming is also broadcast on WBHQ-HD2. On May 23, 2012, Flagler County Broadcasting acquired a construction permit for a new FM station at 98.7 MHz in Palm Coast, Florida, from Joyner Radio, Inc. On May 25, 2012, the FCC granted Flagler County Broadcasting a construction permit to locate the station's transmitter at the same site where WBHQ is located. This permits both stations to remain operational in the event of a weather emergency, since the transmitter site is equipped with a backup generator. 98.7 signed on the air as WAKX on August 1, 2012, with a country music format.
