= Brady Ackerman =

American sports commentator

Brady Ackerman is an American sports commentator in Jacksonville, Florida. He works as an afternoon talk show host 3–7 pm on 1010XL, WJXL radio. He also works on the Gators Sports Network for Florida football. He serves as the co-host on the pre and post game shows as well as the sideline reporter on all Florida football games. In addition to his broadcasting responsibilities he serves as a writer and contributor for Gridiron Now.

== Early life and education ==
Ackerman was born September 10, 1969, in Augusta, Georgia. He graduated from Duncan U. Fletcher High School, Neptune Beach Florida in 1987. He attended the University of Florida earning a Bachelor of Science degree in Public Recreation in 1992.

== Sport ==
Ackerman was a running back for the University of Florida from 1988 to 1992. He received two letters in 1990 and 1991. He had one career touchdown versus Akron in 1990.

== Coaching ==
Ackerman had several stops in his coaching career including on the collegiate level with Valdosta State in Valdosta, Georgia 1994–96 and Jacksonville State in Jacksonville, Alabama, in 1997. He also served as an assistant coach in high school at Ed White High School in Jacksonville, Florida, in 1998–1999. He is currently the football coach at Belleview High School in Belleview, Florida 2020-current

== Broadcasting ==
Ackerman began his career with AM 930 WNZS in Jacksonville, Florida, working with Frank Frangie. He then moved to Ocala, Florida, where he worked with AM 900 WMOP. He also worked with AM 1080 WHOO in Orlando, Florida. His television duties included positions with Sports Channel Florida, Sunshine Network and Comcast Sports Southeast. He co-hosted Talkin Football on CBS, a weekly college football preview show with Tony Barnhardt, Bob Neal and Derrick Rackley. He served as a nightly co-host on SEC Tonight a daily sports show on CBS.

== Philanthropy ==
Ackerman hosted the Brady Ackerman Scramble for Kids to benefit the Boys & Girls Clubs of Marion County. The event was held for 10 years from 2002 to 2012 at Golden Ocala Golf and Equestrian Club.
