= WBHQ =

Coordinates: 29.536°N 81.264°W

- Beverly Beach, Florida; United States
- Broadcast area: Flagler County
- Frequency: 92.7 MHz (HD Radio)
- Branding: Beach 92.7

Programming
- Format: Adult hits
- Subchannels: HD2: WNZF simulcast (Talk); HD3: Kool 100.9 (Oldies)

Ownership
- Owner: Flagler County Broadcasting, LLC
- Sister stations: WAKX; WBHU; WNZF

History
- First air date: 1975
- Former call signs: WPDQ (1987–1989); WZAZ-FM (1989–1991); WJBT (1991–2008); WROO (2008–2009)

Technical information
- Licensing authority: FCC
- Facility ID: 68760
- Class: A
- ERP: 5,500 watts
- HAAT: 104 meters (341 ft)
- Translator: HD3: 100.9 W265CF (Palm Coast)

Links
- Public license information: Public file; LMS
- Webcast: Listen Live; Listen Live (HD3)

WBHQ (92.7 FM) is a commercial radio station licensed to Beverly Beach, Florida, and serving Flagler County. It is owned by Flagler County Broadcasting and broadcasts an adult hits radio format known as "Beach 92.7". Unlike other adult hits stations that mainly play classic rock and classic alternative rock hits of the 1980s and 1990s, WBHQ includes a good deal of the pop hits in its playlist. Like most adult hits stations, it uses no disc jockeys, but it does not have a voice making sarcastic or ironic quips, as heard on Jack FM and Bob FM stations. It was assigned the WBHQ call sign by the Federal Communications Commission on February 20, 2009.

WBHQ has an effective radiated power (ERP) of 5,500 watts. WBHQ broadcasts using HD Radio technology. Its HD2 digital subchannel simulcasts the talk radio format of sister station WNZF (1550 AM_. The HD3 subchannel has an oldies format known as "Kool 100.9". That subchannel feeds FM translator W265CF at 100.9 MHz in Palm Coast.

== History ==
On January 25, 2008, it was announced that 92.7 FM would be one of several Clear Channel Communications radio stations to be sold, in order to remain under the ownership caps following the sale of Clear Channel to private investors. On October 21, 2008, Flagler County Broadcasting, LLC, purchased the station from Aloha Station Trust for $350,000. As a result, on November 10, 2008, the station dropped the gospel music format and became a simulcast of WSOL-FM. Flagler County Broadcasting moved the station to Flagler County which includes Palm Coast, Bunnell, Beverly Beach and Flagler Beach. Flagler County Broadcasting is owned by James Martin; & Gary Smithwick, a Washington communications lawyer. The stations owned by Flagler County Broadcasting, LLC, are managed by vice president David Ayres.

On April 9, 2009, WBHQ began program tests with its new facilities, including HD radio technology. The FCC granted the new license April 21, 2009. The station serves the area from St. Augustine to Ormond Beach, but primarily focuses on Flagler County.

On May 23, 2012, Flagler County Broadcasting acquired the construction permit for a new radio station at 98.7 MHz in Palm Coast, Florida, from Joyner Radio, Inc. On May 25, 2012, the FCC granted Flagler County Broadcasting a construction permit to locate the station's transmitter at the same site where WBHQ is located, but the permit expired without the station being built.
