= WLOP =

- Jesup, Georgia; United States
- Broadcast area: Southeast Georgia
- Frequency: 1370 kHz
- Branding: FSR 1370 the Buzz

Programming
- Format: Fox Sports Radio
- Affiliations: Fox Sports Radio; Jim Rome; Dan Patrick; Georgia Tech; Georgia Southern University; Jacksonville Jaguars; Atlanta Braves

Ownership
- Owner: Jesup Broadcasting Corp.
- Sister stations: WIFO-FM

History
- First air date: July 12, 1949 (as WBGR)
- Former call signs: WBGR (1949–1966)
- Call sign meaning: Wonderful Land of Progress

Technical information
- Licensing authority: FCC
- Facility ID: 31095
- Class: D
- Power: 5,000 watts day; 35 watts night; 500 watts PSRA
- Transmitter coordinates: 31°36′6.8″N 81°55′59.4″W

Links
- Public license information: Public file; LMS
- Website: bigdogcountry.com/1370-wlop-am-the-buzz/

WLOP (1370 AM) is a radio station broadcasting a sports format. Licensed to Jesup, Georgia, United States, the station is owned by Jesup Broadcasting Corp. and features programming from Fox Sports Radio.
