= Painters Hill, Florida =

Unincorporated community in Florida, U.S.

Coordinates: 29°31′52.46″N 81°9′9.74″W

A campground on Florida State Road A1A in Painter's Hill in 1990

Painters Hill is an unincorporated community in Flagler County, Florida, United States. It is located north of Beverly Beach and southeast of Palm Coast on State Road A1A. The community is part of the Deltona–Daytona Beach–Ormond Beach, Florida metropolitan statistical area.
