= WAKX =

- Palm Coast, Florida; United States
- Broadcast area: Palm Coast
- Frequency: 98.7 MHz
- Branding: Kix Country 98.7

Programming
- Format: Country
- Affiliations: Fox News Radio

Ownership
- Owner: Flagler County Broadcasting; (Flagler Broadcasting, LLC)
- Sister stations: WBHQ, WNZF

History
- First air date: August 1, 2012
- Former call signs: WPLC (2009–2012)
- Call sign meaning: "Kix"

Technical information
- Licensing authority: FCC
- Facility ID: 183339
- Class: A
- ERP: 4,000 watts
- HAAT: 99 meters (325 ft)
- Transmitter coordinates: 29°32′7″N 81°15′50″W

Links
- Public license information: Public file; LMS
- Webcast: Listen Live

WAKX (98.7 FM; "Kix Country 98.7") is a radio station licensed to serve the community of Palm Coast, Florida. The station is owned by Flagler County Broadcasting and the broadcast license is held by Flagler Broadcasting, LLC. WAKX shares radio studios in Bunnell, Florida, with sister stations WBHQ (92.7 FM) and WNZF (1550 AM).

== History ==
Ashley Thomas Joyner received the original construction permit for this station from the Federal Communications Commission on December 9, 2009. The new station was assigned the WPLC call sign by the FCC on December 16, 2009. On December 16, 2009, license holder Ashley Thomas Joyner applied to the FCC to transfer the permit to a single shareholder corporation named Joyner Radio, Inc. The move was approved by the FCC on December 29, 2009, and the transaction was consummated on January 4, 2010.

In April 2012, Joyner Radio, Inc., reached an agreement to sell the still-under-construction station to Flagler County Broadcasting for $301,000. The deal was approved by the FCC on May 21, 2012, and the transaction was consummated on May 23, 2012. The station's call sign was changed to WAKX on June 19, 2012.

WAKX launched on August 1, 2012, with a country music format branded as "Kix Country 98.7". WAKX received its license to cover from the FCC on August 7, 2012.
