= Frank Frangie =

American sports announcer

Frank Frangie is an American sports announcer who works as an afternoon drive talk show host on 1010XL/92.5 FM radio stations in Jacksonville, FL. He is the radio play-by-play voice of the Jacksonville Jaguars NFL football team. He also is one of the founders and the president and CEO of GridironNow.com, a website specializing in the coverage of SEC Football. Frank Frangie was a cohost on WQIK AM 1320 with Scott Richards. Source; Scott Richards

== Background/Early media career ==
Frangie is originally from Jacksonville, attended Englewood High School and later the University of Florida, where he earned a degree in Journalism and Communications in 1980. He began his sports media career as a part-time sports writer for the Florida Times-Union/Jacksonville Journal upon graduation from college and became a full-time sports writer with the paper in 1985. He was a sports writer, covering high schools, then major colleges, then finally the University of Florida. He also wrote columns for the afternoon editions of the paper. He remained with the paper until March, 1993.

== Broadcast career ==
In 1988, in addition to his work as a sports writer, he began a career as a radio talk show host. He hosted a show on AM 1320 (WQIK-AM, later becoming WJGR) for one year, then moved to 930 AM (WCRJ, which became WNZS and ultimately WFXJ) and joined longtime host Jay Solomon on his show there from 1989 until 1993, when he resigned from the Florida Times-Union to become full-time host of his own show.

He stayed with 930 AM until July, 2002, when he moved to AM1460 (WZNZ) working with Brady Ackerman. He remained there until April, 2007, when he helped launch 1010XL/92.5 FM which became Jacksonville's first all-sports radio station to air locally originated programming from 6 a.m. until 7 p.m. weekdays. He remains the afternoon drive host on 1010XL/92.5 FM, which is generally considered Jacksonville's most successful sports radio station ever. That position was ensured when the station became the flagship station of the NFL's Jacksonville Jaguars in spring of 2014.

== Team/Network affiliations ==
After moving into a broadcast career on a full-time basis in 1993, he became a pre-game host on the multi-station Gator radio network from 1996 through 1998. That job included hosting pre-game shows for all University of Florida football games during that stretch, plus doing play-by-play and color commentary on Gator baseball, women's basketball and other sports.

He went on to host numerous college football and basketball programs on Fox Sports Florida, Sun Sports, Comcast Sports Southeast and other regional sports networks around the country from 2000 through 2010.

In 2007, he was named the primary radio play-by-play voice of the Touchdown Radio Network, a national network that traveled to and broadcast a prominent national college football game of the week. He worked alongside color analyst Gino Torretta, the 1992 Heisman Trophy winner and the founder of Touchdown Radio.

He worked as the primary Touchdown Radio play-by-play voice until May, 2014, when he was named the radio play-by-play voice of the Jacksonville Jaguars.

== Gridironnow.com ==
In addition to his duties as the afternoon drive host on 1010XL/92.5 FM and as the voice of the Jaguars, Frangie combined with Ben Balke, President of Etchasoft, Inc. and Seven Bridges Radio – the ownership entity of 1010XL/92.5 FM – to launch GridironNow.com (GN) in September, 2015. GN is a college football website specializing in the coverage of SEC Football and employs nationally known writers Tony Barnhart, Mike Huguenin, Jimmy Hyams and others.
