= WBHU =

- St. Augustine Beach, Florida; United States
- Broadcast area: Jacksonville, Florida
- Frequency: 105.5 MHz (HD Radio)
- Branding: Beach 105.5

Programming
- Format: Adult hits
- Subchannels: HD2: 106.3 St. Augustine Country (Country music)

Ownership
- Owner: James Martin; (Flagler Broadcasting, LLC)
- Sister stations: WBHQ

History
- First air date: 1995
- Former call signs: WJQR (1995–2000); WYGV (2000–2003); WSJF (2003–2011); WYRE-FM (2011–2014); WALE (September 30-December 22, 2014)

Technical information
- Licensing authority: FCC
- Facility ID: 53672
- Class: C3
- ERP: 16,000 watts
- HAAT: 125 meters (410 ft)
- Transmitter coordinates: 29°47′47″N 81°19′53″W
- Translator: HD2: 106.3 W292DE (St. Augustine)

Links
- Public license information: Public file; LMS
- Webcast: Listen Live; Listen Live (HD2)

WBHU (105.5 FM, "Beach 105.5") is a radio station broadcasting an adult hits format. Previously, it aired an oldies music format as part of the True Oldies Channel network. Other previous formats included hot country (as WJQR), rhythmic oldies and smooth jazz.

Licensed to St. Augustine Beach, Florida, United States, the station serves the Jacksonville, Florida, area. The station is currently owned by James Martin, through licensee Flagler Broadcasting, LLC.

== History ==
WJQR signed on as "Hot Country 105.5 WJQR" with Jacksonville personality and former WZAZ station owner Mark Majors as morning host. The rest of the day was automated with the Hot Country radio service. At the time, WJQR was owned by Ken & Eileen Stein along with its co-owned sister station WAOC (1420 AM).

Both stations were sold in 1999 with the FM station switching from modern country to Groovin' Oldies with the WYGV call sign. WYGV simulcast with its new sister station WXGV (105.3 FM) in Fernandina Beach, Florida.

On March 21, 2003, the callsign was changed again to WSJF as both stations flipped to a smooth jazz format.

WSJF's smooth jazz format lasted until 2008 and then had several formats between 2008 and 2011: rhythmic AC, oldies, talk, Spanish tropical and adult alternative.

On May 16, 2011, WSJF changed callsigns to WYRE-FM and introduced a hot adult contemporary format, branded as "The Wire". On September 30, 2014, WYRE-FM changed its call letters to WALE; on October 2, it shifted to adult rock, branded as "105.5 The Whale". On November 4, 2014, WALE dropped the "105.5 The Whale" branding and became "105.5 WALE", before relaunching as "Beach 105.5". Flagler Broadcasting, which purchased the station for $400,000, changed the station's callsign from WALE to WBHU to match this branding on December 22, 2014; the company already uses the "Beach" branding on WBHQ (92.7 FM) in Beverly Beach.
