= WIFO-FM =

- Jesup, Georgia; United States
- Frequency: 105.5 MHz
- Branding: Big Dog Country

Programming
- Format: Country music; oldies weekends
- Affiliations: Atlanta Braves; Jacksonville Jaguars; Georgia Tech; Georgia Southern University; Wayne County High School; The True Oldies Channel

Ownership
- Owner: Jesup Broadcasting Corp.
- Sister stations: WLOP

History
- First air date: 1968
- Former call signs: WLOP-FM (1968–1971)
- Call sign meaning: Information Radio

Technical information
- Licensing authority: FCC
- Facility ID: 31096
- Class: C3
- ERP: 25,000 watts
- HAAT: 94.0 meters
- Transmitter coordinates: 31°36′6.8″N 81°55′59.4″W

Links
- Public license information: Public file; LMS
- Website: www.bigdogcountry.com

WIFO-FM (105.5 FM) is a radio station in Jesup, Georgia, United States, airing a full-service country music format during the week and oldies music from The True Oldies Channel on weekends. It is owned by Jesup Broadcasting Corporation alongside WLOP (1370 AM).

The station's construction permit was authorized on July 24, 1967, to Wayne Broadcasting, Inc. A license was filed for in July 1968, and the station changed call signs to WIFO-FM on July 16, 1971.

A fire December 7, 2005, destroyed the original studios. New permanent facilities located at the original site were completed on June 24, 2006.
