= WKBX =

- Kingsland, Georgia; United States
- Broadcast area: St. Marys, Georgia
- Frequency: 106.3 MHz
- Branding: K-BAY 106.3

Programming
- Format: Country

Ownership
- Owner: Radio Kings Bay, Inc.

History
- First air date: February 23, 1987

Technical information
- Licensing authority: FCC
- Facility ID: 54649
- Class: A
- ERP: 6,000 watts
- HAAT: 100 meters (330 ft)
- Transmitter coordinates: 30°48′4.00″N 81°40′43.00″W

Links
- Public license information: Public file; LMS
- Webcast: Listen Live
- Website: kbay1063.com

WKBX is a commercial radio station that broadcasts to the Brunswick and Jacksonville areas on 106.3 FM. The station is licensed in Kingsland to Radio Kings Bay, Inc.. It is branded as KBAY 106.3 and broadcasts a country music format.
