= WGNE-FM =

Radio station in Middleburg, Florida, serving Jacksonville, Florida

- Middleburg, Florida; United States
- Broadcast area: Jacksonville metropolitan area
- Frequency: 99.9 MHz (HD Radio)
- Branding: 99.9 Gator Country

Programming
- Format: Country music

Ownership
- Owner: Renda Media; (Renda Broadcasting Corp. of Nevada)
- Sister stations: WEJZ

History
- First air date: July 14, 1972
- Former call signs: WIYD (1972–1982); WNFY (1982–1983); WNFI (1983–1993); WFKS (1993–2000)

Technical information
- Licensing authority: FCC
- Facility ID: 15897
- Class: C1
- ERP: 48,000 watts
- HAAT: 300 meters (980 ft)
- Transmitter coordinates: 30°19′22.9″N 81°38′33.3″W

Links
- Public license information: Public file; LMS
- Webcast: Listen live
- Website: www.999gatorcountry.com

WGNE-FM (99.9 MHz) is a radio station licensed to Middleburg, Florida, United States, serving the Jacksonville metropolitan area. It is owned by Renda Media and airs a country music radio format as "99.9 Gator Country" and primarily competes against iHeartMedia-owned WQIK.

WGNE's studios and offices are in the Arlington district of Jacksonville. The station transmits from a facility in downtown Jacksonville near the studios of First Coast News.

== History ==
=== Beautiful music ===
On July 14, 1972, the station first signed on as WIYD, licensed to Palatka, Florida, a town about 50 miles (80 km) south of Jacksonville. It aired a beautiful music format as "Wide FM", and was the FM sister station to WWPF, both stations owned by Hall Communications. Because it broadcast from a tower only 180 feet (55 m) tall, it was limited to serving the Palatka-St. Augustine area.

In 1978, the AM station switched its call sign to WIYD, while the FM station was sold to the Sis Radio Company and became WIYD-FM. The new owners got a construction permit from the Federal Communications Commission to construct a tower more than 900 feet tall, making 99.9 audible from Jacksonville to Daytona Beach.

=== Top 40 ===
In 1981, the station was sold to the Ronnette Communications Corporation, with studios and offices moving to Ormond Beach, and flipped to Top 40 outlet WNFY. In the Jacksonville radio market, it competed with long time Top 40 AM radio leader WAPE (now WOKV) and FM challenger WIVY (now WEZI). In about a year, WAPE left the Top 40 format for oldies.

In 1983, the station switched its call letters to WNFI, while remaining Top 40. Its tower was now nearly 1,300 feet (400 m) tall, with a power of 100,000 watts, allowing WNFI to be heard over much of the northern section of Florida's Atlantic coast. In 1993, the station was sold again, this time to the Daytona Beach Broadcasting Corporation. The station remained Top 40, but the call letters were switched to WFKS to fit the new moniker "Florida's Kiss-FM"."WFKS 99.9 Palatka Daytona Beach, FL 17 January 2000".

=== Country music ===
In 1996, Renda Media (known as Renda Broadcasting at the time) paid $6.5 million for WNFI and WKQL (now WMUV). Renda switched WNFI's format to country, renaming the station WGNE-FM and using the moniker "99.9 Froggy-FM". In 2005, the station's studios and offices moved to Atlantic Boulevard in Jacksonville.

In the early 2010s, the station's city of license was moved to Middleburg, Florida, an unincorporated community in Clay County, which borders Jacksonville. WGNE switched to a tower on Gator Bowl Boulevard in Jacksonville used by WTLV and other Jacksonville TV and FM stations. While the move improved the station's signal to office towers and apartment buildings in Jacksonville, as well as its northern suburbs, it reduced coverage to the south. The power was cut by more than half and the antenna height was reduced by 300 feet (91 m). WGNE switched its moniker to "99.9 Gator Country".

== On-air personalities ==
Steve Sutton- Sutton's radio career began in 1993 at WJRX in MacClenney. Sutton went on to the Hoyle & Fizz Show on WAPE in the morning, hosted a talk show on WCRJ-AM at lunch, and continued traffic reporting in the afternoon with Trane on the Radio at WAPE. In 1995, he began working full time at WAPE on Big Ape Morning Zoo alongside Eden Kendall, Amadeus, Hoyle, and Ashley King. After almost 12 years of the Big Ape Morning Zoo being on air, in December 2006 Sutton, Kendall, and Amadeus left WAPE. After about 6 months of being off the air, on June 20, 2007, the trio took over the morning show at 99.9 Gator Country.

Eden Kendall- Kendall is a graduate of the University of Florida and the mother of two children. Kendall worked on Big Ape Morning Zoo alongside Steve Sutton, Amadeus, Hoyle, and Ashley King. After almost 12 years of the Big Ape Morning Zoo being on air, in December 2006 Sutton, Kendall, and Amadeus left WAPE. After about 6 months of being off the air, on June 20, 2007, the trio took over the morning show at 99.9 Gator Country. As well as working on Gator Country's "Hometown Morning Show" Kendall also hosts WJXT's daytime broadcast, River City Live. During the Jacksonville Jaguar's football season Kendall can also be seen on WCWJ's "The Mark Brunell Show.

Amadeus- Amadeus moved to Jacksonville when he was in the 4th grade. After high school, Amadeus began working at Publix and took a part-time job at Turtle's Records & Tapes. On January 1, 1990, Amadeus left Turtle's Records and Tapes to work part-time at 95.1 WAPE. In 1996, Amadeus got the opportunity to join the Big Ape Morning Zoo. in December 2006 Sutton, Kendall, and Amadeus left WAPE. After about 6 months of being off the air, on June 20, 2007, the trio took over the morning show at 99.9 Gator Country. Amadeus also hosted the CW-17 Weekend Showplace for 17 years.

Brian Jordan- Jordan was born and raised in Jacksonville, Florida. Jordan worked at WAPE for 4 years. After taking a 2-year break Jordan began working at 99.9 Gator Country.

Matt Basford- Basford was born and raised in Jacksonville, Florida and attended Hofstra University in New York. His career in radio began at the age of 16 years old when he worked WJAX, now known as WAPE. He has worked in radio in Chicago, Salt Lake City, New Orleans, and NPR in Los Angeles. While in Los Angeles, Basford worked as an actor in television and film as well as doing some improv and stand up comedy. Basford moved back to Jacksonville in 2000 and now works on 99.9 Gator Country and WEJZ.
