= Beverly Beach, Florida =

- Town
- Seal
- Motto: "The Little Town with a Good Heart!"
- Interactive map of Beverly Beach, Florida
- Coordinates: 29°30′59″N 81°08′49″W
- Country: United States
- State: Florida
- County: Flagler
- Founded (Beverly Beach Shores): 1925
- Incorporated (Town of Beverly Beach): June 23, 1955

Government
  - Type: Mayor-Commission
  - Mayor: Stephen Emmett
  - Vice Mayor: Jeffrey Schuitema
  - Commissioners: Jeffrey Borges, James Howard, Philip "Mick" Krakowski, and Kyle Blake
  - Town Clerk: James D. Ardell
  - Town Attorney: William Bosch III

Area
  - Total: 0.39 sq mi (1.00 km^{2})
  - Land: 0.34 sq mi (0.87 km^{2})
  - Water: 0.050 sq mi (0.13 km^{2})
- Elevation: 3 ft (0.91 m)

Population (2020)
  - Total: 474
  - Density: 1,411.4/sq mi (544.95/km^{2})
- Time zone: UTC-5 (Eastern (EST))
  - Summer (DST): UTC-4 (EDT)
- ZIP code: 32136
- Area code: 386
- FIPS code: 12-06100
- GNIS feature ID: 2405260
- Website: mybeverlybeach.org

Beverly Beach is a town in Flagler County, Florida, United States. It is part of the Deltona–Daytona Beach–Ormond Beach, FL metropolitan statistical area. The population was 474 at the 2020 census.

== Geography ==
Beverly Beach is bordered to the north by the unincorporated community of Painters Hill and to the south by the city of Flagler Beach. The western border follows the Intracoastal Waterway, and the eastern border is the Atlantic Ocean. Florida State Road A1A passes through the town, leading south 23 miles (37 km) to Daytona Beach and north 30 miles (48 km) to St. Augustine.

According to the United States Census Bureau, the Town of Beverly Beach has a total area of 0.39 square miles (1.00 km^{2}), of which 0.34 square miles (0.88 km^{2}) is land and 0.05 square miles (0.12 km^{2}), or 12.14%, is water.

=== Climate ===
The climate in this area is characterized by hot, humid summers and generally mild winters. According to the Köppen climate classification, the Town of Beverly Beach has a humid subtropical climate zone (Cfa).

== Demographics ==
=== 2010 and 2020 census ===
Beverly Beach racial composition (Hispanics excluded from racial categories) (NH = Non-Hispanic)
Race	Pop 2010	Pop 2020	% 2010	% 2020
White (NH)	335	435	99.11%	91.77%
Black or African American (NH)	0	1	0.00%	0.21%
Native American or Alaska Native (NH)	0	0	0.00%	0.00%
Asian (NH)	0	1	0.00%	0.21%
Pacific Islander or Native Hawaiian (NH)	0	0	0.00%	0.00%
Some other race (NH)	0	2	0.00%	0.42%
Two or more races/Multiracial (NH)	1	19	0.30%	4.01%
Hispanic or Latino (any race)	2	16	0.59%	3.38%
Total	338	474	100.00%	100.00%

As of the 2020 United States census, there were 474 people, 316 households, and 183 families residing in the town.

As of the 2010 United States census, there were 338 people, 249 households, and 147 families residing in the town.

=== 2000 census ===
Historical population
Census	Pop.	Note	%±
1960	9		—
1970	21		133.3%
1980	217		933.3%
1990	312		43.8%
2000	547		75.3%
2010	338		−38.2%
2020	474		40.2%
U.S. Decennial Census

As of the census of 2000, there were 547 people, 312 households, and 174 families residing in the town. The population density was 1,527.4 inhabitants per square mile (589.7/km^{2}). There were 441 housing units at an average density of 1,231.4 per square mile (475.4/km^{2}). The racial makeup of the town was 96.71% White, 0.18% African American, 0.73% Native American, 0.18% Asian, and 2.19% from two or more races. Hispanic or Latino of any race were 0.18% of the population.

In 2000, there were 312 households, out of which 7.4% had children under the age of 18 living with them, 47.4% were married couples living together, 5.8% had a female householder with no husband present, and 44.2% were non-families. 41.3% of all households were made up of individuals, and 22.1% had someone living alone who was 65 years of age or older. The average household size was 1.75 and the average family size was 2.26.

In 2000, in the town, the population was spread out, with 6.6% under the age of 18, 2.9% from 18 to 24, 11.7% from 25 to 44, 33.3% from 45 to 64, and 45.5% who were 65 years of age or older. The median age was 63 years. For every 100 females, there were 89.3 males. For every 100 females age 18 and over, there were 85.8 males.

In 2000, the median income for a household in the town was $26,667, and the median income for a family was $34,167. Males had a median income of $30,250 versus $24,583 for females. The per capita income for the town was $19,488. About 11.5% of families and 8.7% of the population were below the poverty line, including 10.7% of those under age 18 and 4.2% of those age 65 or over.
