= WJXL-FM =

Radio station in Jacksonville Beach, Florida

Semi-simulcast with WJXL (AM) Jacksonville Beach
- Jacksonville Beach, Florida; United States
- Broadcast area: Jacksonville metropolitan area
- Frequency: 92.5 MHz
- Branding: 1010 XL 92.5 FM

Programming
- Format: Sports
- Affiliations: Westwood One Sports; Jacksonville Jaguars Radio Network

Ownership
- Owner: River City Broadcasting, LLC
- Sister stations: WJXL

History
- First air date: November 1989 (as WOKF)
- Former call signs: WOKF (1989–2003); WFJO (2003–2012)
- Call sign meaning: W Jacksonville XL

Technical information
- Licensing authority: FCC
- Facility ID: 22005
- Class: A
- ERP: 1,700 watts
- HAAT: 191 meters (627 ft)
- Transmitter coordinates: 30°16′34.90″N 81°33′50.30″W

Links
- Public license information: Public file; LMS
- Webcast: Listen Live
- Website: 1010xl.com

WJXL-FM (92.5 MHz) is a commercial radio station licensed to Jacksonville Beach, Florida, and serving the Jacksonville metropolitan area. WJXL-FM is owned by River City Broadcasting, LLC.

The station airs a sports radio format, and is simulcast on AM 1010 WJXL. They serve as the flagship stations of the Jacksonville Jaguars Radio Network. Most weekday shows have local hosts, with the Infinity Sports Network Network heard late nights and weekends.

WJXL-FM's effective radiated power is 1,700 watts. The studios, offices and transmitter are located on Hogan Road in Jacksonville.

== History ==
The station began broadcasting in November 1989 as WOKF, and was originally licensed to Folkston, Georgia. The station aired a country music format. The station was originally owned by former Folkston mayor Jack Mays. By 1999, the station had adopted an oldies format. In 2002, the station was sold to TAMA Group for $650,000.

In December 2003, the station's call sign was changed to WFJO, and the station adopted a rhythmic oldies format as "Jammin' Oldies 92.5." By 2005, the station had begun airing an urban gospel format. By 2006, the station had begun airing a regional Mexican format as "Fiesta 92.5".

In 2009, the station began airing progressive talk programming overnight and mornings as "Radio Free Jacksonville," while the Rejoice! Musical Soul Food urban gospel network aired afternoons and evenings. Later that year, the station began airing a Spanish tropical format as "La Nueva Fiesta".

Shortly thereafter, the station began simulcasting the sports programming of 1010 WJXL. In March 2011, the station returned to a gospel music format as "Joy 92.5."

In 2011, the station was moved to Jacksonville Beach, Florida. In 2012, the station was purchased by River City Broadcasting for $1.95 million. In March of that year, the station returned to simulcasting 1010 WJXL. In September 2012, the station's call sign was changed to WJXL-FM.
