= WJXL (AM) =

Radio station in Jacksonville Beach, Florida, United States

Semi-simulcast with WJXL-FM Jacksonville Beach
- Jacksonville Beach, Florida; United States
- Broadcast area: Jacksonville metropolitan area
- Frequency: 1010 kHz
- Branding: 1010 XL 92.5 FM

Programming
- Format: Sports
- Affiliations: VSiN Radio; Jacksonville Jaguars Radio Network

Ownership
- Owner: Seven Bridges Radio, LLC
- Sister stations: WJXL-FM

History
- First air date: 1947 (as WJVB)
- Former call signs: WJVB (1947–1957); WZRO (1957–1963); WBIX (1963–1988); WXTL (1988–1996); WIOJ (1996–2007)
- Call sign meaning: W Jacksonville XL

Technical information
- Licensing authority: FCC
- Facility ID: 63600
- Class: B
- Power: 50,000 watts day 30,000 watts night
- Transmitter coordinates: 30°17′57″N 82°0′26″W

Links
- Public license information: Public file; LMS
- Webcast: Listen Live
- Website: 1010xl.com

WJXL (1010 kHz) is a commercial AM radio station licensed to Jacksonville Beach, Florida, and serving the Jacksonville metropolitan area. WJXL is owned by Seven Bridges Radio, LLC.

The station airs a sports radio format, and is simulcast on co-owned 92.5 WJXL-FM. Most weekday shows have local hosts, with the VSiN Radio Network heard late nights and weekends. They serve as the flagship stations of the Jacksonville Jaguars Radio Network.

WJXL broadcasts by day with 50,000 watts, the maximum power for commercial AM stations. Because AM 1010 is a clear channel frequency, WJXL reduces power at night to 30,000 watts and uses a directional antenna at all times to protect other stations on 1010 kHz. The transmitter is located on U.S. Route 90 in Jacksonville, west of Baldwin, Florida. The studios and offices are on Hogan Road, also in Jacksonville.

== History ==
The station began broadcasting in 1947, and originally held the call sign WJVB. The station was originally owned by Jacksonville Beach Broadcasting Company and ran 250 watts during daytime hours only. In 1953, the station's power was increased to 1,000 watts. In 1957, the station was sold to Andrew B. Letson for $60,000, and the station's call sign was changed to WZRO. In 1963, the station's call sign was changed to WBIX. The station was silent for a period in 1963, and the station's power was increased to 10,000 watts late that year. In 1966, the station was sold to Twin-Ten Radio for $250,000.

The station aired a Gospel music format in the 1970s and 1980s. In 1985, the station was sold to Sudbrink Broadcasting for $436,200. In 1988, the station's call sign was changed to WXTL. By 1990, the station had added nighttime operations of 143 watts. In 1996, the station was purchased by McEntee Broadcasting for $240,000, and its call sign was changed to WIOJ. As WXTL and WIOJ the station aired a religious format.

In 2007, the station was sold to Seven Bridges Radio for $3.8 million, and the station adopted a sports format as "1010 XL", with its call sign being changed to WJXL. That year, the station's power was increased to 50,000 during the day and 30,000 watts at night. On August 4, 2008, the station began to be simulcast on 105.3 WJSJ. The simulcast on 105.3 FM ended July 31, 2009. Shortly thereafter the station would begin to be simulcast on 92.5 WFJO. In March 2011, the simulcast would end, as WFJO adopted a gospel music format as "Joy 92.5". In March 2012, the station would again be simulcast on 92.5 WFJO, which would change its call sign to WJXL-FM in September.
