= WEJZ =

Adult contemporary radio station in Jacksonville, Florida

Coordinates: 30.323°N 81.643°W

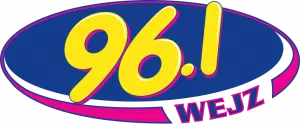
- Jacksonville, Florida; United States
- Broadcast area: Jacksonville metropolitan area
- Frequency: 96.1 MHz (HD Radio)
- Branding: 96.1 WEJZ

Programming
- Format: Adult contemporary
- Affiliations: Premiere Networks

Ownership
- Owner: Renda Media; (Renda Broadcasting Corp. of Nevada)
- Sister stations: WGNE-FM

History
- First air date: 1948
- Former call signs: WMBR-FM (1948–1965); WKTZ-FM (1965–1985); WLCS-FM (1985–1986); WLCS (1986–1987)

Technical information
- Licensing authority: FCC
- Facility ID: 55706
- Class: C0
- ERP: 100,000 watts
- HAAT: 300 meters (984 ft)

Links
- Public license information: Public file; LMS
- Webcast: Listen Live
- Website: wejz.com

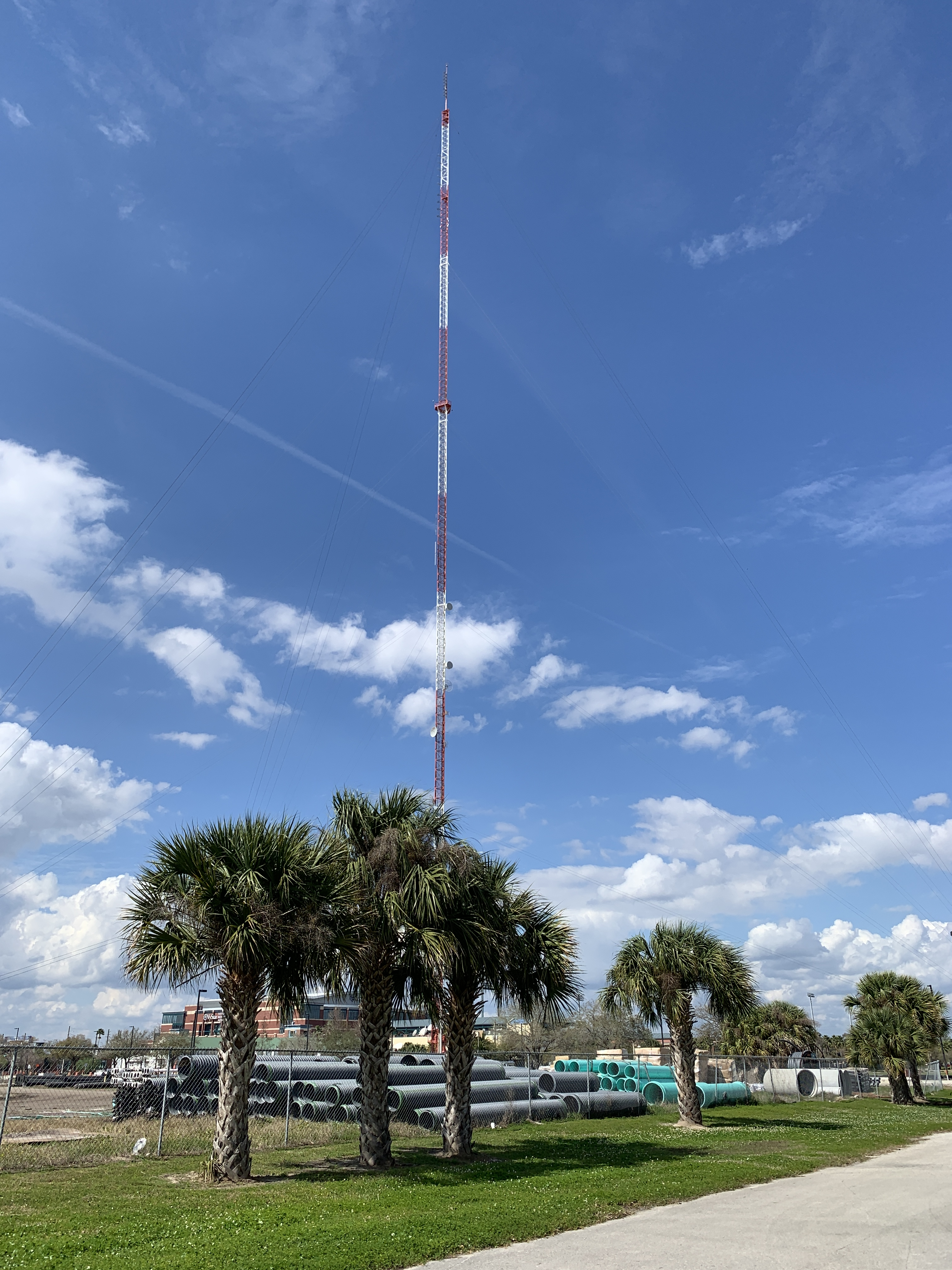
Tower used by WEJZ

WEJZ (96.1 FM) is a commercial radio station licensed to Jacksonville, Florida. It is owned by Renda Media and airs an adult contemporary radio format, focusing on music from the 80s and 90s. WEJZ is the Jacksonville affiliate for the syndicated Delilah show. Between mid-November and December 25 each year, the station switches to all-Christmas music.

WEJZ's studios and offices are located on Atlantic Boulevard in the Arlington district of Jacksonville, and it transmits from Downtown Jacksonville, via a tower shared with other radio and TV stations. WEJZ is a Class C radio station, broadcasting at 100,000 watts effective radiated power (ERP) from an antenna at nearly 1,000 feet. The signal stretches from Brunswick, Georgia, to Gainesville, Florida.

== History ==
=== Beautiful Music ===
In 1948, the station first signed on as WMBR-FM, sister station to WMBR (now WQOP). It was owned by the Florida Broadcasting Company, which the following year put WMBR-TV on the air, the second TV station in Florida (now WJXT). WMBR-FM simulcast the programming of its AM counterpart.

In the 1950s, the Washington Post bought the TV station, while the radio stations came under the ownership of WMBR, Incorporated. In 1965, 96.1 became WKTZ-FM, when it was bought by Jones College, and was paired with WKTZ. The two stations aired a beautiful music format of soft instrumentals, with limited talk and commercials.

=== Soft Adult Contemporary ===
On October 1, 1985, 96.1 was bought by the Kravis Company, which already owned WRXJ (now WFXJ). The call sign became WLCS-FM, airing a soft adult contemporary format. Meanwhile, WKTZ-FM, still owned by Jones College, became non-commercial, moving to 90.9 MHz (now K-Love station WJKV).

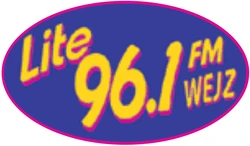
Logo used 2002-2004

On June 21, 1987, WLCS was bought by WIN Communications. The new owners changed the call letters to the current WEJZ, continuing its Soft AC format and rebranding the station "Lite 96.1."

=== Mainstream AC ===
In June 1990, the station was acquired by Renda Broadcasting. In January 2015, WEJZ dropped the "Lite" in its name, rebranded as 96.1 WEJZ, and moved to a more upbeat playlist of mainstream adult contemporary songs from the 1980s to current hits.

In 2019, 96.1 rebranded to 96.1 EJZ and switched to more modern mainstream playlist. They became known as playing "The most music for your workday" and added popular features that they maintain to this day, such as commercial-free hours of music. However, in 2022, the station reverted to the 96.1 WEJZ branding and moved to a Soft rock-based selection of music.

== Christmas Music ==
Christmas Logo of WEJZ

WEJZ first flipped to all Christmas music during the holidays in 2006, and has continued the practice every year since. For most of November and December each year, it calls itself "Jacksonville's Christmas Music Station".

WEJZ begins airing Christmas music in mid-November (generally the week before Thanksgiving) and continues it throughout the Christmas season, ending on December 26. Each year on Christmas Eve starting at noon and continuing for 36 hours, WEJZ begins airing little to no advertisements. Christmas music generally increases ratings for the station as it hits #1 in the Nielsen Holiday Ratings.

In 2023, the station set a new record high for having a 19.8 market share in Jacksonville during the Holiday season. This placed WEJZ as the second-highest listened-to radio station in the country during the 2023 Christmas Season, only behind another Christmas station, KSFI in Salt Lake City, which hit a 20.2 share. WEJZ formerly ran an event called "12 Days of Christmas" where the station would give away prizes to listeners; however, this was discontinued in 2022.

Usually, WEJZ has no rival for Christmas music in Jacksonville. However, there are some cases where WEJZ has to compete for the audience. Such cases were in 2017 and 2024 when 102.9 WEZI flipped to all-Christmas music for the holiday season. Other scenarios are Christian Contemporary stations, such as WCRJ and WJKV, flipping to Christmas Music, but with many Christian artists in the mix of music. Generally, these stations do not reach as high in the ratings as WEJZ.

== Programming ==
WEJZ has a large on-air staff. Yvonne Velazquez is live weekdays from 5:30 am - 10 am. Jordan Kline covers middays at the station, Matt Basford is on-air in the afternoon, and Brian Jordan covers the weekends. WEJZ also carries the nationally syndicated call-in and dedication show hosted by Delilah, which airs Sunday through Friday 7 pm - 12 am. Overnights are automated with no live DJs.

Mornings had been co-hosted by Arthur Crofton and Yvonne Velazquez since 2010. Crofton, who was born in England, had been the host of the WEJZ Morning Show for 34 years, since August 23, 1990. However, he died in September 2024 at the age of 72.

WEJZ bears a resemblance to other Renda Broadcasting-owned AC stations. The most notable is WSHH Pittsburgh, which shares some of the same DJs as WEJZ, an example being Jordan Kline. Both stations carry the same music genre, and are considered important assets by their parent company. Both stations also have commercial-free hours to begin each workday after morning drive time.

WEJZ currently has one sister station in Jacksonville, Country music 99.9 WGNE-FM. Renda Broadcasting formerly owned 100.7 WMUV and 94.1 WSOS-FM, before selling those stations to Chesapeake-Portsmouth Broadcasting Corporation in 2014. This left WEJZ and WGNE-FM as the only Renda-owned stations left in Northeast Florida.
