= WOKV =

WOKV may refer to:

- WOKV (AM) 690 in Jacksonville, Florida
- WOKV-FM 104.5 in Jacksonville, Florida
- WGRR or WOKV (1978–1981), 103.5 MHz in Hamilton, Ohio
- WBOB (AM) or WOKV (1981–1991) 600 kHz in Jacksonville, Florida
- WMUV or WOKV (1991–1992) 100.7 MHz in Brunswick, Georgia
- WHJX or WOKV (2006–2013) 106.5 MHz in Ponte Vedra Beach, Florida
