= WJAX =

WJAX may refer to:

- WJAX-TV, a television station (channel 19/PSIP 47) licensed to Jacksonville, Florida, United States
- WKTZ (AM), a radio station (1220 AM) licensed to Jacksonville, Florida, which held the call sign WJAX from 1987 to 2014
- WOKV (AM), a radio station (690 AM) licensed to Jacksonville, Florida, which used the call sign WJAX from 1986 to 1987
- WAPE-FM, a radio station (95.1 FM) licensed to Jacksonville, Florida, which used the call sign WJAX-FM from 1949 to 1986
- WFXJ (AM), a radio station (930 AM) licensed to Jacksonville, Florida, which used the call sign WJAX from 1925 to 1986
