= WBGB =

WBGB may refer to:

- Bintulu Airport (ICAO code WBGB)
- WBGB (FM), a radio station (103.3 FM) licensed to serve Boston, Massachusetts, United States
- WPDQ (FM), a radio station (91.3 FM) licensed to serve Scottsville, Kentucky, United States, which held the call sign WBGB from 2008 to 2018
- WHJX, a radio station (106.5 FM) licensed to serve Ponte Vedra Beach, Florida, United States, which held the call sign WBGB from 1998 to 2006
- West Bengal Gramin Bank, bank of India
