= WPDQ =

WPDQ may refer to:

- WPDQ (FM), a radio station (91.3 FM) licensed to serve Scottsville, Kentucky, United States
- WRFM (FM), a radio station (103.9 FM) licensed to serve Drakesboro, Kentucky, which held the call sign WPDQ from 2020 to 2021
- WRDR, a radio station (89.7 FM) licensed to serve Freehold Township, New Jersey, United States, which held the call sign WPDQ-FM from 1997 to 2003
- WBOB (AM), a radio station (600 AM) licensed to serve Jacksonville, Florida, United States, which held the call sign WPDQ from 1942 to 1975 and 1994 to 1996
- WOKV (AM), a radio station (690 AM) licensed to serve Jacksonville, Florida, which held the call sign WPDQ from 1989 to 1994
- WBHQ, a radio station (92.7 FM) licensed to serve Beverly Beach, Florida, which held the call sign WPDQ from 1987 to 1989
