= WXXJ =

WXXJ may refer to:

- WHJX, a radio station (106.5 FM) licensed to serve Ponte Vedra Beach, Florida, United States, which held the call sign WXXJ from 2017 to 2023
- WEZI (FM), a radio station (102.9 FM) licensed to serve Jacksonville, Florida, which held the call sign WXXJ from 2009 to 2017
