= WKTZ =

WKTZ may refer to:

- WKTZ (AM), a radio station (1220 AM) licensed to serve Jacksonville, Florida, United States
- WKTZ-FM, a radio station (95.9 FM) licensed to serve Loch Lynn Heights, Maryland, United States
- WJKV, a radio station (90.9 FM) licensed to serve Jacksonville, Florida, which held the call sign WKTZ-FM from 1985 to 2015
