= WJGL =

Radio station in Jacksonville, Florida

- Jacksonville, Florida; United States
- Broadcast area: Jacksonville metro area
- Frequency: 96.9 MHz (HD Radio)
- Branding: 96.9 The Eagle

Programming
- Language: English
- Format: Classic hits-Classic rock
- Subchannels: HD2: Power 106.1 (Urban contemporary)

Ownership
- Owner: Cox Media Group; (Cox Radio, LLC)
- Sister stations: WAPE-FM; WEZI; WHJX; WOKV; WOKV-FM

History
- First air date: July 1, 1969 (as WRLJ)
- Former call signs: WRLJ (1969–1971); WPDQ-FM (1971–1975); WAIV-FM (1975–1990); WKQL (1990–2005)
- Call sign meaning: Jacksonville Eagle

Technical information
- Licensing authority: FCC
- Facility ID: 53590
- Class: C
- ERP: 98,000 watts (100,000 with beam tilt)
- HAAT: 309 meters (1,014 ft)
- Transmitter coordinates: 30°16′34.00″N 81°33′53.00″W
- Translator: HD2: 106.1 W291CI (Jacksonville)

Links
- Public license information: Public file; LMS
- Webcast: Listen live Listen live (via Audacy); Listen live (HD2); Listen live (via Audacy) (HD2)
- Website: www.969theeagle.com www.power1061.com (HD2)

WJGL (96.9 MHz, "96.9 The Eagle") is a commercial FM radio station in Jacksonville, Florida. The station is owned by Cox Radio, a division of the Cox Media Group. WJGL airs a classic hits radio format that leans towards classic rock, playing primarily rock songs from the 1970s, 80s and some 90s, while avoiding pop/dance artists such as Michael Jackson, Prince and Madonna.

The station's studios and offices are located on Belfort Parkway in Jacksonville's Southside district. The transmitter is off Hogan Road in the Arlington neighborhood. WJGL is a Class C FM station, running at an effective radiated power (ERP) of 98,000 watts (100,000 with beam tilt), from a tower at 1,014 feet (309 m) in height above average terrain (HAAT). Its signal stretches from the Georgia coast to south of St. Augustine, Florida.

WJGL broadcasts in the HD Radio format. WJGL's HD2 channel carries an urban contemporary format, which is also heard on 225-watt translator station W291CI, calling itself "Power 106.1."

== History ==
=== WJHP-FM, WZFM, WZOK-FM ===
The 96.9 frequency originally was the home of WJHP-FM which first began experimental broadcasts in 1947, before any other FM stations were on the air in Jacksonville. It was the FM counterpart to AM 1320 WJHP (now WJNJ). It was owned by The Metropolis Company, a division of The Jacksonville Journal, a defunct afternoon newspaper. WJHP-FM mostly simulcast the programming of WJHP.

In 1960, the call sign was changed to WZFM. The callsign switched again in 1961 to WZOK-FM. With FM radio still in its early days, the station signed off in 1962. The license was returned to the Federal Communications Commission (FCC) and the frequency remained unoccupied for seven years. WZOK's callsign later went to Rockford, Illinois.

=== WRLJ, WPDQ-FM ===
On July 1, 1969, a new station signed on at 96.9 MHz as WRLJ. It was owned by Beck Broadcasting, which also owned AM 600 WPDQ (now WBOB). While WPDQ was a Top 40 station, WRLJ played beautiful music. A couple of years after going on the air, the station picked up the call letters of its AM sister station, becoming WPDQ-FM.

=== WAIV ===
In 1975, the two stations were sold to Rounsaville Broadcasting of Jacksonville (later Affiliated Broadcasting). AM 600 became middle of the road formatted WMBR while 96.9 became WAIV, a progressive rock outlet. Because Jacksonville is on the Atlantic Coast, the call sign represented the word "Wave."

In 1980, the call letters for AM 600 were switched to match the FM station, becoming WAIV and WAIV-FM. Both stations were Top 40 outlets. At the time, the FCC would not allow an AM and an FM station in medium to large cities to simulcast full-time, so the two stations shared some hours and were separately programmed most hours.

By the mid-1980s, AM 600 had become WOKV, a talk radio station (later moving to AM 690), while WAIV-FM switched to adult contemporary.

=== WKQL ===
In 1986, both stations were bought by EZ Communications and in 1990, the FM station became WKQL, "Cool 96.9." It featured an oldies format.

=== WJGL ===
In 2000, WKQL and WOKV were bought by Cox Radio, Inc., the current owner. In 2005, WKQL changed call letters to the current WJGL, shifted to classic hits, and rebranded as "96.9 The Eagle." The station eliminated most 1960s music and the pop and dance artists, focusing on rock songs of the 1970s, 80s and some 90s.
