= WAPE =

WAPE may refer to:

- WAPE-FM, a radio station (95.1 FM) licensed to Jacksonville, Florida, United States
- WOKV (AM), a radio station (690 AM) licensed to Jacksonville, Florida, United States, which held the call sign WAPE from 1958 to 1989
