= Paschim Banga Gramin Bank =

Indian regional rural bank

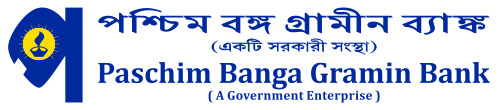
- Bank for U – Banking for All
- Company type: Regional Rural Bank
- Industry: Banking, Financial services
- Founded: 26 February 2007
- Defunct: 30 April 2025
- Successor: West Bengal Gramin Bank
- Headquarters: Howrah, West Bengal, India
- Number of locations: 230 branches
- Area served: West Bengal
- Key people: Pranab Kumar Biswas (Chairman)
- Products: consumer banking, corporate banking, finance and insurance, Investment banking, mortgage loans, wealth management, Mobile Banking, BHIM, UPI, Point of sale
- Net income: ▲₹67.97 million (US$710,000) as on 31 March 2019
- Total assets: ▲50.65 crore as on 31 March 2024
- Owner: Government of India (50%); Government of West Bengal (15%); UCO Bank (35%)
- Parent: Ministry of Finance, Government of India
- Website: www.pbgbank.com

Paschim Banga Gramin Bank is a premier regional rural bank in India. It is under the ownership of Ministry of Finance, Government of India. It was established on 26 February 2007 in exercise of the powers conferred by Sub-section (1) of Section 23A of the Regional Rural Bank Act, 1976 (21 of 1976). The bank was established by the amalgamation of Howrah Gramin Bank, Bardhaman Gramin Bank and Mayurakshi Gramin Bank. The tagline of the bank is "Bank for U – Banking for All".

This bank is sponsored by UCO Bank and owned by the government of India, the government of West Bengal and UCO Bank. The shareholders of the bank are the Government of India (50%), UCO Bank (35%) and the Government of West Bengal (15%). The bank's head office is located at Tikiapara, Howrah, West Bengal.

As of 31 March 2024, the bank made a net profit of 50.65 crores.

Bangiya Gramin Vikash Bank, Paschim Banga Gramin Bank and Uttarbanga Kshetriya Gramin Bank merged into a single unified entity named as West Bengal Gramin Bank w. e. f. May 1,2025 under the sponsorship of Punjab National Bank in the state of West Bengal.

== Bank structure ==
The bank operates in five districts of West Bengal State, namely, Howrah, Hooghly, Purba Bardhaman, Paschim Bardhaman and Birbhum, with its head office at Howrah, West Bengal.

It has 230 branches and 4 regional offices. The regional offices are in Howrah, Hooghly, Bardhaman, and Suri.

The Ministry of Finance announced the merger of Paschim Banga Gramin Bank, Uttarbanga Kshetriya Gramin Bank and Bangiya Gramin Vikash Bank w.e.f. May 1, 2025. The new name will be West Bengal Gramin Bank.

== See also ==
- Banking in India
- List of banks in India
- Reserve Bank of India
- Regional Rural Bank
- Indian Financial System Code
- List of largest banks
- List of companies of India
- Make in India
