= UCO Bank =

Indian public sector bank

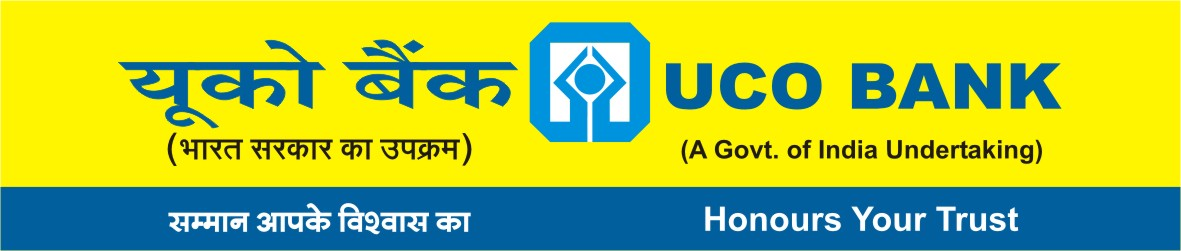

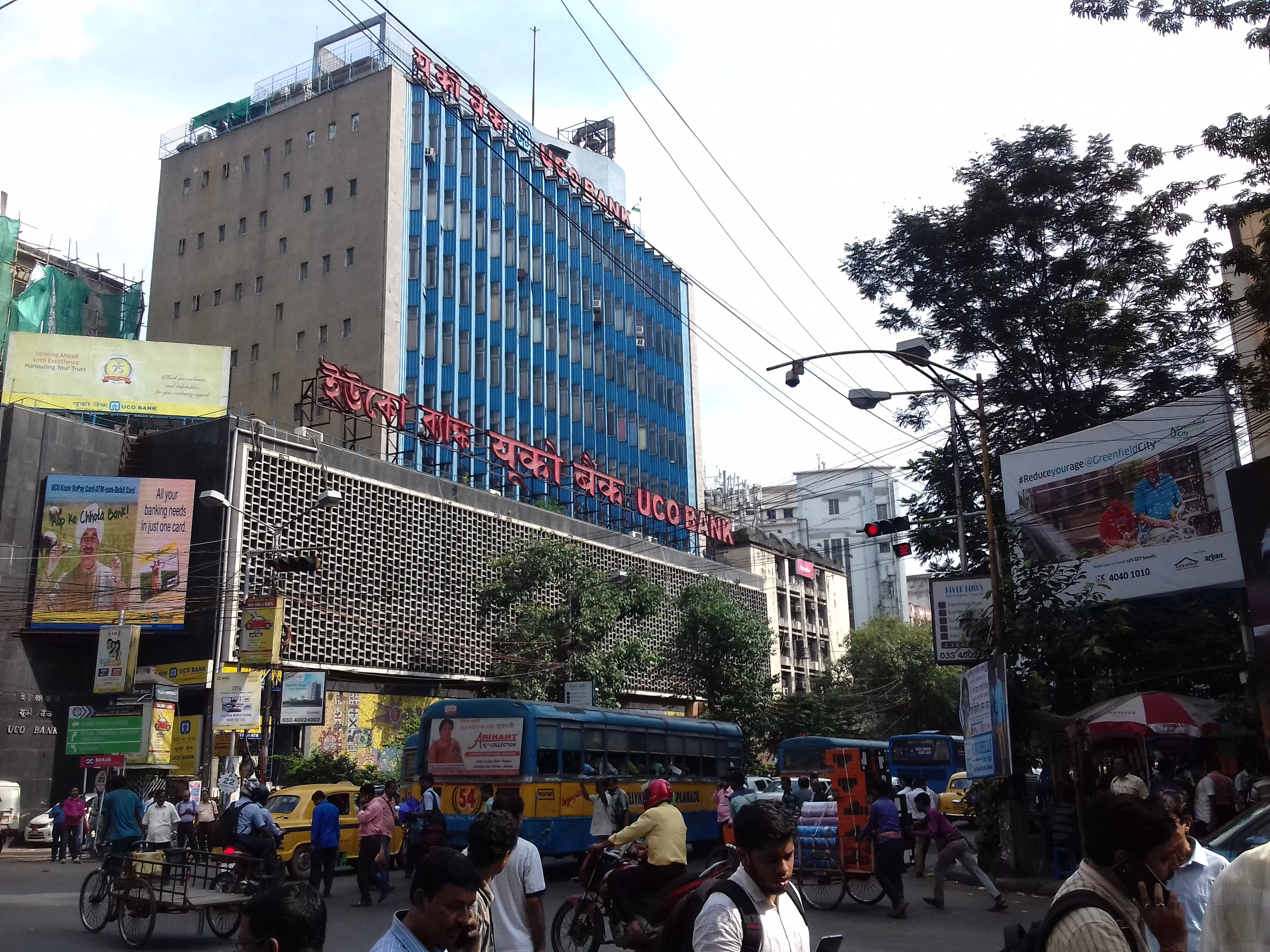
- UCO Bank head office in Kolkata
- Formerly: United Commercial Bank
- Type: Public
- Traded as: NSE: UCOBANK; BSE: 532505
- ISIN: INE691A01018
- Industry: Banking; Financial services
- Founded: 6 January 1943; 83 years ago
- Founder: G. D. Birla
- Headquarters: BTM Sarani, Kolkata, West Bengal, India
- Number of locations: India: 3,412 branches 2,647 ATMs; International: 2 branches in 2 countries 1 representative office
- Area served: Worldwide
- Key people: Ashwani Kumar (MD & CEO)
- Products: Consumer banking, corporate banking, finance and insurance, investment banking, mortgage loans, private banking, wealth management
- Revenue: ▲₹29,473 crore (US$3.1 billion)(2025)
- Operating income: ▲₹6,037 crore (US$630 million) (2025)
- Net income: ▲₹2,444 crore (US$250 million) (2025)
- Total assets: ▲₹362,481 crore (US$38 billion) (2025)
- Total equity: ▲₹31,017 crore (US$3.2 billion) (2025)
- Number of employees: 21,049
- Parent: Government of India (90.95%)
- Capital ratio: 17.12% (2025)
- Website: uco.bank.in

UCO Bank, formerly United Commercial Bank, is an Indian public sector bank, headquartered in Kolkata. It was founded on 6 January 1943. It is a medium sized public sector bank in India and ranked 1948 in Forbes Global 2000 list of year 2018 & ranked 80 on the Fortune India 500 list in 2020.

UCO Bank is the only Government of India-owned bank headquartered in East India. As of 2026, the bank has more than 3,000 service units and 43 zonal offices. It also has two overseas branches in Singapore and Hong Kong.

== History ==
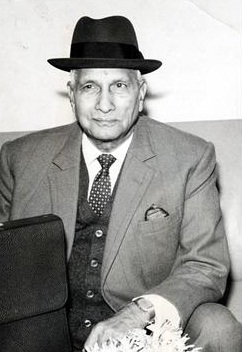
G. D. Birla, founder of UCO Bank

G. D. Birla, an Indian industrialist, during the Quit India movement of 1942, conceived the idea of organising a commercial bank with Indian capital and management, and the United Commercial Bank Limited was incorporated to give shape to that idea. The bank was started with Calcutta as its head office with an issued capital of ₹2 crores, of which ₹1 crore was actually paid up. Birla was its chairman; the Board of Directors included eminent personalities of India drawn from many fields. The bank opened 14 branches simultaneously across India.

After World War II, United Commercial Bank opened several overseas branches. The first, in 1947, was in Rangoon. Branches in Singapore (1951), Hong Kong (March 1952), London (1953), and Malaysia followed. In 1963 the Burmese government nationalised United Commercial Bank's three branches there, which became People's Bank No. 6.

The Bank's Singapore Operations commenced on 21 April 1951 with the opening of the Singapore branch and subsequently Serangoon branch was opened in "Little India" on 7 March 1959. The international linkage from Singapore is supported by a large number of Indian branches network through the Integrated Treasury Branch, Mumbai. Other branches in India also provide international banking facilities through Authorised Branches of the bank.

This international network is further augmented by correspondent arrangements with leading Banks at all important world centres in various countries.

On 15 September 1967, Jalpaiguri Banking and Trading Corporation (JBTC) which had been established in Jalpaiguri in 1887 (or 1889; accounts differ), made a voluntary transfer of its assets and liabilities to United Commercial Bank. JBTC had only one office and specialised in lending against mortgages on tea gardens.

The Government of India nationalised United Commercial Bank on 19 July 1969. The nationalised bank continued the operations of the overseas branches in London, Singapore, and Hong Kong. However, Malaysian law forbade foreign government ownership of banks in Malaysia. Therefore, United Commercial Bank (UCO Bank), Indian Overseas Bank, and Indian Bank contributed their operations in Malaysia to a new joint-venture bank incorporated in Malaysia, United Asian Bank with each of the three parent banks owning a third of the shares. At the time, Indian Bank had three branches, and Indian Overseas Bank and United Commercial Bank had eight between them.

To keep pace with the developing scenario and expansion of business, the Bank undertook an exercise in organisational restructuring in the year 1972. This resulted in more functional specialisation, decentralisation of administration and emphasis on the development of personnel skills and attitudes. Side by side, whole-hearted commitment to the government's poverty alleviation programmes continued and the convenorship of the State Level Bankers' Committee (SLBC) was entrusted to the Bank for Odisha and Himachal Pradesh in 1983.

An act of parliament changed the bank's name to UCO Bank in 1985, as a bank in Bangladesh existed with the name United Commercial Bank PLC, which caused confusion in the international banking arena.

In 1991, Bank of Commerce acquired United Asian Bank; in time CIMB came to own Bank of Commerce.

In 1998, UCO closed its London branch. Bank of Baroda acquired the assets and liabilities, but not the personnel, who were made redundant.

Following the amalgamation of Paschim Banga Gramin Bank into West Bengal Gramin Bank, now sponsored by Punjab National Bank, UCO Bank no longer has any Regional Rural Bank under its sponsorship as of 1 May 2025.

== Operations ==
As on 31 March 2026, government shareholding in the Bank stood at 90.95%. For FY 2025–26, the Bank registered a net profit of ₹2,768 crore. The global business of the Bank reached ₹5,90,314 crore as on 31 March 2026.

=== Domestic presence ===
As of 31 March 2026, UCO Bank had 3,412 domestic branches and 2,647 ATM centres across the country.

The domestic branches include 6 flagship corporate branches, 7 asset nanagement branches, 4 service branches, 1 central pension processing center, and 1 integrated treasury branch. Furthermore, there are 25 MCU branches, 43 retail loan hubs, 43 SME & agriculture loan hubs, 12 integrated loan hubs, and 70 currency chests functioning across the country, typically attached to major city branches at various centres.

=== International presence ===
Besides providing inland banking services through its network of branches in India, bank has 2 overseas branches (one each in Singapore and Hong Kong) and 1 representative office has been established in Tehran, Iran.

Additionally, the bank holds an active SWIFT membership and maintains correspondent banking relationships with several international banks to facilitate global trade finance and cross-border remittances.

=== Board of directors ===
As of July 2026, the UCO Bank board of directors has six members:

- Aravamudan Krishna Kumar (Non-Executive Chairman)
- Hari Har Mishra (Government Nominee Director)
- Rajendra Kumar Saboo (Executive Director)
- Vijaykumar Nivrutti Kamble (Executive Director)
- Sarada Prasan Mohanty (RBI Nominee Director)
- Rajesh Kumar Ailawadi (Shareholder Director)

=== Regional management ===
UCO Bank has 49 zonal offices.

=== Training ===
The training of newly recruited as well as present staff is overseen by seven training colleges around India:

- Central Staff College, Kolkata
- Staff Training Centre, Ahmedabad
- Staff Training Centre, Bhubaneswar
- Staff Training Centre, Bhopal
- Staff Training Centre, Chandigarh
- Staff Training Centre, Chennai
- Staff Training Centre, Jaipur

== Subsidiaries ==
Paschim Banga Gramin Bank, a Regional Rural Bank of West Bengal, was formerly sponsored by UCO Bank, which owned a 35% stake. However, following its amalgamation into West Bengal Gramin Bank, which is now sponsored by Punjab National Bank, UCO Bank no longer has any subsidiary bank under its sponsorship.

== See also ==
- Banking in India
- List of banks in India
- Reserve Bank of India
- Indian Financial System Code
