= Jones College =

Jones College may refer to:

- Jones College (Rice University), one of eleven residential colleges of Rice University in Houston, Texas
- Jones College (Jacksonville), a college in Jacksonville, Florida
- Jones College (Mississippi), a community college in Mississippi
- Jones College, the former name of a college in Denver renamed in 1998 to Kaplan University
