= WNTC =

WNTC may refer to:

- WNTC (AM), a radio station (790 AM) licensed to serve Ashland City, Tennessee, United States
- WPDQ (FM), a radio station (91.3 FM) licensed to serve Scottsville, Kentucky, United States, which held the call signs WNTC and WNTC-FM from 2020 to 2021
- WRFM (FM), a radio station (103.9 FM) licensed to serve Drakesboro, Kentucky, which held the call sign WNTC from 1997 to 2020
- WLYD, a radio station (93.5 FM) licensed to serve Chandler, Indiana, United States, which held the call sign WNTC from 1993 to 1996
- WAYA-FM, a radio station (100.9 FM) licensed to serve Ridgeville, South Carolina, United States, which held the call sign WNTC from 1992 to 1993
