= WZAZ =

Jacksonville, Florida; United States
- Frequency: 1400 kHz
- Branding: Gospel 1400, The Light

Programming
- Format: Gospel music

Ownership
- Owner: Titus Harvest Dome Spectrum Church, Inc.

History
- First air date: July 4, 1950
- Former call signs: WRHC (1950–1972); WERD (1972–1984)

Technical information
- Licensing authority: FCC
- Facility ID: 68761
- Class: C
- Power: 1,000 watts
- Transmitter coordinates: 30°19′43″N 81°41′42″W
- Translator(s): 98.7 W254CW (Jacksonville)

Links
- Public license information: Public file; LMS

WZAZ (1400 AM) is a radio station in Jacksonville, Florida, which carries a gospel music format. It is owned by Titus Harvest Dome Spectrum Church, Inc. The station went on the air in 1950 and has spent most of its history serving the Black community in Jacksonville.

== History ==
Bert Richmond and Harold Cohn applied to the Federal Communications Commission on July 8, 1946, for a new radio station to serve Jacksonville on 1400 kHz dependent on WMBR vacating the frequency. The commission granted the application on August 18, 1949.

WRHC went on the air on July 4, 1950. Cohn later was also part of an application consortium for television channel 12 in Jacksonville. WRHC became one of Jacksonville's main Black radio stations. One on-air personality was Ken Knight, who hosted the "Knight Train" show and also served as station vice president; Knight was the first Black person to produce a TV show in the city. Knight's departure for a competitor, WOBS, in 1970 created major issues for WRHC; he departed because of issues with management, taking with him multiple advertising accounts, and the Florida Black Front began picketing the station. Cohn, claiming threats toward advertisers and calling the Black Front's demands impractical, put the station on the market. Cohn died the next year, and operation passed to his son, Harold S. Cohn II.

In 1972, WRHC changed its call sign to WERD, branding as "The Good Word Station". In 1979, the Cohns sold the station for $488,000 to Gilliam Communications, Inc., a Black-owned firm that also owned WLOK in Memphis, Tennessee. Gilliam owned the station until the Cohns foreclosed on the mortgage in August 1983 and reacquired WERD in bankruptcy.

After the foreclosure, WERD was sold to Pres-Jas Inc., owned by Mark Picus; Picus's father Lawrence had been the court-appointed receiver for the bankrupt station. After the sale, WERD flipped from an urban contemporary format to urban adult contemporary, focusing on music of the 1950s and 1960s, under new WZAZ call letters. WZAZ's personality format differentiated it from other AM stations and gave it for a short time a ratings boost; one DJ, Don Smith, was known as "The Pressure Cooker" and for such antics as playing a toilet flushing sound effect on the air. In November 1985, Smith attempted to break the world record for radio broadcasting endurance only to fail more than 11 days in when two tubes in the WZAZ transmitter blew, disqualifying him from continuing. However, WZAZ's ratings bump was short-lived, especially after contemporary hit station WAPE-FM emerged in 1986 and zoomed to a 20-percent audience share. Though a general-market station, WAPE-FM had a higher Black audience than WZAZ. In 1988, investors threatened to change the format to country to increase earnings, leading manager Picus to start a petition campaign on air.

Picus acquired a station at 92.7 MHz, then with the WPDQ call sign, in 1989; the acquisition of the station, renamed WZAZ-FM, required a $1.85 million loan. After Citizens & Southern National Bank (C&S) declared the loan in default for a payment that was 15 days late, Picus and the Picus Broadcasting Corporation filed for Chapter 11 bankruptcy protection in June 1990. The station was sold the next year to UNC Media Group, sister to a firm that specialized in financing minority-owned communications companies.

UNC Media sold the stations to Jacor in 1995 at a time when Jacor was assembling a cluster and expanding from two stations to five. Jacor flipped WZAZ to gospel and was encouraged enough by the ratings increase, tripling in 18 months, to make a similar move in St. Louis. When Jacor merged into Clear Channel Communications in 1999, it was required to put four stations into a divestiture trust. Two—WZNZ (1460 AM) and WBGB (106.5 FM)—were higher-priority and were sold off to Concord Media Group of Tampa. Though Concord later bought WZAZ and another station also being divested—WJGR (1320 AM)—Clear Channel sold the advertising for the Concord cluster and the stations operated from Clear Channel's studios, creating a cluster of 11 stations between the two companies. In November 2001, Ohio store owner David Ringer petitioned the FCC to examine the Clear Channel–Concord arrangement.

The Concord stations were sold to Salem Communications in 2003. They separated from the Clear Channel studios and sales staff to in-house operations on Jacksonville's Southside. The company sold the FM station to Cox Radio in 2006 and immediately sold the AM stations to Chesapeake-Portsmouth Broadcasting Corporation in a $2.8 million transaction. Chesapeake-Portsmouth agreed to sell WZAZ to the Titus Harvest Dome Spectrum Church in 2007 for $1.19 million.
