= Beautiful music =

Music format

Beautiful music (sometimes abbreviated as BM, B/EZ or BM/EZ for "beautiful music/easy listening") is a mostly instrumental music format that was prominent in North American radio from the late 1950s through the 1980s. Easy listening, elevator music, light music, mood music, and Muzak are other terms that overlap with this format and the style of music that it featured. Beautiful music can also be regarded as a subset of the middle of the road radio format.

== History ==
Beautiful music initially offered soft and unobtrusive instrumental selections on a very structured schedule with limited advertising interruptions. It often functioned as a free background music service for stores, with commercial breaks consisting only of announcements aimed at shoppers already in the stores. This practice was known as "storecasting" and was very common on the FM dial in the 1940s and 1950s.

Many of these FM stations usually simulcast their AM station and used a subcarrier (see also Subsidiary Communications Authority) to transmit a secondary signal to a store receiver by subscription. The signal was usually a slow-moving audio tape of "background music" or Muzak-type service, which was independent of the simulcast AM signal.

Some FM stations made more income from these music subscriptions than from their main programming. WITH-FM, in Baltimore, Maryland (1950s and 1960s), had to keep its FM carrier on the air until 2:00 a.m. for restaurants that subscribed to the service, and thus could not sign off their main FM carrier until that time. The station ran a repeat of its previous day's evening concert on its main FM program line.

=== Growth as a radio format ===
One of the first beautiful music radio stations in the US was KIXL in the Dallas-Ft. Worth, Texas, area. As early as 1947 it played orchestral music on AM radio (1040), and later on FM (104.5). KIXL changed to KEZL (as in "easy listening") in 1973, but ended with a change to adult contemporary in 1976.

In 1959, Gordon McLendon, who had interests in Top-40 radio in Dallas as well as other markets, decided to "counter-program" in San Francisco since several Top-40 stations were already there. McLendon established beautiful music AM station KABL (a tribute to the San Francisco cable cars, named by McLendon's executive assistant Billie Page Odom) which was successful through the 1990s. It then experimented with combining elements of big bands and soft rock until its demise in the early 21st century. It was reborn as an Internet radio station where it can be heard today.

In the early 1960s, the Federal Communications Commission adopted a standard for transmitting and receiving stereo signals on a single channel of the FM band. In addition to delivering stereo sound, FM broadcasting provided clearer sound quality and better resistance to interference than AM, thus being ideal for broadcasting the beautiful music format.

In Baltimore, Maryland, programmer Art Wander developed a beautiful music format for the 50,000-watt NBC affiliate WBAL/1090. The station format launched in the fall of 1960 featured music sweeps of lush instrumentals with subtle comments from their staff announcers. The format changed to sports and talk when competing FM stations broadcast beautiful music and easy listening.

In 1963, Marlin Taylor created a custom-designed beautiful music format at Philadelphia's WDVR. Within four months, WDVR became the No. 1 rated FM station in the Philadelphia market. This was one of the first big successes in FM broadcasting, and was instrumental in establishing the viability of FM. WDVR was a resource for mature listeners who were driven from AM radio at the time when WFIL and WIBG (and others) switched to rock 'n' roll programming. WDVR's billboards made the adult audience aware of the new station.

=== Airtime resell practice. Libraries of music for radio stations ===
Others, such as Jim Schulke, devised a method of buying air time on FM stations in bulk and reselling the blocks to interested advertisers. Schulke formed Stereo Radio Productions (SRP) to help his stations get better ratings and pull in more agency advertising dollars. His stations used six hundred 10 1/2-inch-diameter (270 mm) reels of stereo reel-to-reel tape set on multiple machines so that 15-minute segments would play at a time, alternating from one player to another, allowing a varied programming format in which no half-hour was repeated within a two-week period. One of Schulke's stations using this "matched flow" concept was WDVR's chief competitor in the beautiful music format in Philadelphia, WWSH-FM.

Peters Productions in San Diego, California was active throughout the late 1960s through the early 1980s. At one time Peters Productions offered 7 different syndicated radio formats plus radio/television "station image" packages (custom jingle and integrated promotional graphics packages.) The most popular syndicated radio format was a beautiful music format on a library of 100 reel-to-reel tapes, with 6 new reels provided per month. It originated when founder Ed Peters was station manager of San Diego radio station KFMB-FM. The format aired on over 120 stations during its peak, and was known originally as "Music Only for a Woman". Later the name was changed to "Music Just for the Two of Us".

=== Stereotypical instrumental-vocal mixes, related to BM/EZ ===
Many beautiful music programmers constructed their own style of sets, incorporating some vocal songs, usually one to each 15-minute set. Most stations adopted a 70–80% instrumental – 20–30% vocal mix, a few offered 90% instrumentals, and a handful were entirely instrumental. Initially, the vocalists consisted of artists such as Frank Sinatra, Nat King Cole, Peggy Lee, Tony Bennett, Patti Page, Johnny Mathis, Perry Como, Doris Day, and others.

By the 1970s, softer songs by artists like The Carpenters, Anne Murray, John Denver, Barry Manilow, Barbra Streisand, Dionne Warwick, Neil Diamond, Elton John, Nancy Wilson and others were added to the mix on many stations. Also, some of these stations played soft songs by artists like Elvis Presley, Beatles, Billy Joel, and other rock-based artists. The main test for the vocals played was not the background of the artist but whether or not the song was soft. All vocals on such stations had to be soft. Therefore, songs like "She's Out of My Life" by non-core artists like Michael Jackson or "Live to Tell" by Madonna would be heard on some of these stations. On the other hand, even uptempo jazzier songs by standards artists, such as "Detour" by Patti Page, would not be heard on beautiful music stations except during specialty shows.

Also, during weekday morning drive times, most beautiful music stations increased the vocals to as much as 50 percent to accommodate a broader audience. While these stations were mostly playing instrumentals, some had a couple of specialty programs that were vocal-based such as a Big Band program on Saturday nights, a Frank Sinatra show sometime on the weekends, and maybe a program featuring Broadway showtunes.

Generally, the recordings heard on beautiful music stations were newly orchestrated arrangements of the songs of the day. These were available from the major record labels and performed by such artists as Andre Kostelanetz, Percy Faith, Mantovani, the 101 Strings, Billy Vaughn, The Living Strings, Frank Chacksfield, among others. When the record companies cut back on releasing this material, syndicators of the format had custom recordings produced for them, performed by many different orchestras from around the world. These new custom recordings were usually instrumental versions of current or recent rock and roll or pop hit songs, a move intended to give the stations more mass appeal without selling out. Some stations would also occasionally play earlier big band-era recordings from the 1940s and early 1950s.

Many beautiful music stations would air a few Christmas songs per hour beginning around Thanksgiving each year, increasing their frequency as the month of December progressed. The stations' vocal content would typically increase to about 40 to 60 percent of the playlist during this period, as well. There would then be a special marathon of seasonal music on December 24 and 25. After the 25th, most continued to play wall-to-wall Christmas music until the first of the year. This concept was later borrowed (and expanded upon) by Soft AC, Oldies, and even some country music and Hot AC stations. Today, the average wall-to-wall Christmas format begins on Thanksgiving and ends at the end of the day around midnight on December 26.

The predominantly instrumental-vocal mix is still in use today, mainly by smooth jazz stations.

=== Declining years ===
Peters was the first beautiful music syndicator to sell its library in the late 1980s to Broadcast Programming, Inc., which then bought several other syndicators. (BPI, later part of Jones Radio Networks, is part of Dial Global as of 2012.) Bonneville, which had acquired the SRP and Century catalogs in the 1980s, sold its beautiful music assets to Broadcast Programming in November 1993.

Some beautiful music stations (especially on AM) successfully transitioned to adult contemporary formats, often with call letter changes to shed the "elevator music" identity. Many of these stations marketed themselves as playing many of the same songs from the original artists; adult contemporary had the benefit of having core acts that could much more easily be marketed and were more familiar to listeners, as opposed to the lesser-known and poorer-selling studio acts that made up the majority of the beautiful music format.

Beautiful music stations declined in the late 1980s and early 1990s as country music became popular and moved to the FM dial (formerly, country was relegated to AM). Many beautiful music stations, especially in rural areas, switched to country around that time.

While the seasonal Christmas music format helped salvage softer vocal selections from the era even as formats such as adult standards withered, radio industry writer Sean Ross noted in 2005 that this did not apply to beautiful music instrumentals, which remained widely unpopular. Ross noted that beautiful music drew as much revulsion from listeners as novelty songs and that the appetite for instrumental Christmas music, even among older listeners, was mostly restricted to newer instrumental cuts such as from Mannheim Steamroller and Trans-Siberian Orchestra. A slight uptick in beautiful Christmas music artists such as Ray Conniff and Percy Faith was noted in 2024, as much of their body of Christmas works were known hymns and radio listeners were becoming more eager for explicitly Christian content in their Christmas mixes.

=== List of instrumental artists associated with "beautiful music" radio format era ===
Some instrumental artists associated with beautiful music have included:

- 101 Strings Orchestra
- 12 Girls Band
- André Kostelanetz
- Arthur Fiedler
- Arthur Greenslade
- Arthur Lyman
- Bert Kaempfert
- Billy Vaughn and his Orchestra
- Bob James
- Bradley Joseph
- Burt Bacharach
- Cal Tjader
- Caravelli
- Carl Doy
- Charles Williams
- Cyril Ornadel
- David Rose
- Enoch Light
- Eric Coates
- Ernest Tomlinson
- Felix Slatkin
- Ferrante & Teicher
- Floyd Cramer
- Francis Lai
- Franck Pourcel
- Frank Chacksfield
- Frank Cordell
- Frank De Vol
- Frank Perkins
- Geoff Love
- George Melachrino
- George Shearing Quintette
- Geraldo (and his New Concert Orchestra)
- Henry Mancini
- Hollyridge Strings
- Hugo Winterhalter
- Jackie Gleason
- James Galway
- James Last
- Joe Harnell
- John Barry
- John Williams
- Johnny Douglas
- Johnny Pearson
- Lawrence Welk
- Leroy Anderson
- Les Baxter
- Lex de Azevedo
- Liberace
- Living Strings
- The Longines Symphonette
- Mantovani
- Morton Gould
- Nelson Riddle and his Orchestra
- Nick Ingman
- Norrie Paramor
- Paul Mauriat
- Paul Weston
- Percy Faith
- Peter Nero
- Ray Martin
- Richard Clayderman
- Richard Hayman
- Robert Farnon
- Robert Maxwell
- Roger Williams
- Ron Goodwin
- Ronald Binge
- Ronnie Aldrich
- Sidney Torch
- Stanley Black
- Syd Dale
- Tony Mottola
- Victor Young
- Wes Montgomery

=== List of vocal artists associated with "beautiful music" radio format era ===
Among the vocal artists featured on beautiful music stations may include many of the same ones featured on the adult standards format and others:

- ABBA (softer selections)
- Andy Williams
- Anita Kerr Singers
- Anne Murray
- B.J. Thomas
- Barbra Streisand
- Barry Manilow
- Bing Crosby
- Captain & Tennille
- Carly Simon
- Connie Francis
- Dan Fogelberg
- Dean Martin
- Diana Krall
- Doris Day
- Elvis Presley (softer selections)
- Engelbert Humperdinck
- Frank Sinatra
- Harry Connick, Jr.
- Helen Reddy
- Jack Jones
- Jo Stafford
- John Denver
- John Gary
- Johnny Mann Singers
- Johnny Mathis
- Linda Ronstadt
- Matt Monro
- Melissa Manchester
- Michael Bublé
- Nana Mouskouri
- Nancy Wilson
- Nat King Cole
- Neil Diamond
- Norah Jones
- Olivia Newton-John
- Patti Page
- Perry Como
- Petula Clark
- Ray Charles Singers
- Ray Conniff Singers
- Ronnie Dove
- Rosemary Clooney
- Sérgio Mendes
- Snatam Kaur
- Steve Lawrence
- The Association
- The Beatles (softer selections)
- The Carpenters
- The Lettermen
- Vic Damone

== Today ==
Today's smooth jazz radio stations maintain the structure and style of the beautiful music format. The format continues on a few non-commercial radio stations, including KCEA (89.1 FM) in Atherton, California; KWXY (1340 AM) and (92.3 FM) in Cathedral City, California KLUX (89.5 FM) in Corpus Christi, Texas; KHOY (88.1 FM) in Laredo, Texas; KNCT-FM (91.3 FM) in Killeen, Texas; KGUD (90.7 FM) in Longmont, Colorado.

Jones College of Jacksonville operated WKTZ-FM, a beautiful music noncommercial station, from its 1964 founding until 2014, when it sold the station (and sister station WJAX) to national Christian broadcaster Educational Media Foundation for $3.375 million. EMF ended the beautiful music format and switched WKTZ-FM to WJKV, broadcasting its in-house satellite K-Love network.

Some commercial beautiful music stations still exist, often in areas with large retiree populations. These are often popular in their markets. An annual influx of vacationers from colder climates has helped such stations as KAHM (102.1 MHz) in Prescott, Arizona, and, until 2021 KWXY (1340 kHz) in Cathedral City, California. Most of the remaining commercial beautiful music stations are primarily in markets with major resorts. An exception is WGCY in Gibson City, Illinois which serves rural areas in Central Illinois with mostly instrumental beautiful music.

Today most stations that play beautiful music are either characterized as nostalgia, smooth jazz or easy listening. In Canada, Evanov Communications' "Jewel"-branded stations in Ontario and Quebec (including CKDX-FM in metro Toronto, CJWL-FM in Ottawa, and CHSV-FM in metropolitan Montreal, among others), which play soft adult contemporary music during the day and standards in the evening, feature an hour of traditional beautiful music from 11:00 p.m. to midnight, dubbing the program "The Instrumental Concert Series". The Cleveland market features non-profit WKHR 91.5, which plays many classic beautiful and light jazz instrumentals from the 1930s through the 1960s, as well as timeless pop and jazz vocals.

Radio production veteran Jason 'Jake' Longwell, currently produces and hosts a weekly hour long radio program devoted to Beautiful Music called Something Beautiful.

=== Beautiful music without FM radio ===
- Sirius XM Satellite Radio programs a dedicated beautiful music channel, Escape, for its subscribers
- Such services as Music Choice and DMX provide the format as part of their offerings to cable and satellite television subscribers.
- Muzak also provides several beautiful music channels which are described as "environmental" background music channels.
- Instrumental beautiful music can also be found on a number of Internet radio feeds.
  - Some stations listed below have Internet "doubles" streaming their former BM/EZ formats, such as WMEZ in Pensacola, Florida.
  - Additionally, many archived airchecks of BM/EZ formats are available online, through YouTube or various radio aircheck websites.

=== List of radio stations, related to BM/EZ ===
- WGPC in Albany, Georgia
- WFMZ in Allentown, Pennsylvania
- WFBG in Altoona, Pennsylvania
- WVTL in Amsterdam, New York
- WPCH in Atlanta, Georgia
- KGFM in Bakersfield, California
- WLIF and WBAL in Baltimore, Maryland
- KICE-FM in Bend, Oregon
- WAPI-FM and WQEZ in Birmingham, Alabama
- WHAJ in Bluefield, West Virginia
- KBOI-FM in Boise, Idaho
- WHDH-FM, WHUE-AM-FM, WJIB-FM, and WWEL-AM-FM in Boston, Massachusetts
- WEZN in Bridgeport, Connecticut
- WHBC-FM in Canton, Ohio
- WBES in Charleston, West Virginia
- WEZC, WBT-FM and WRLX in Charlotte, North Carolina
- WDEF-FM in Chattanooga, Tennessee
- WLAK, WLOO, WCLR, WNUS-FM and WAIT in Chicago, Illinois
- KPAY-FM in Chico, California
- WWEZ, WLVV and WAEF (later WLQA) in Cincinnati, Ohio
- WDOK, WKSW, WDBN, WBEA, WNOB, and WQAL in Cleveland, Ohio
- WXKG in Cookeville, Tennessee
- KRDO-FM in Colorado Springs, Colorado
- WBUK (later WTVN-FM) and WBNS-FM in Columbus, Ohio
- KBOX (later KTLC and KMEZ-FM), KIXL (later KEZT) and KOAX in Dallas/Fort Worth
- WDAQ in Danbury, Connecticut
- WHIO in Dayton, Ohio
- KDEM in Deming, New Mexico
- KLIR and KOSI in Denver, Colorado
- WJR-FM and WWJ-FM (later WJOI) in Detroit, Michigan
- KPNW-FM in Eugene, Oregon
- WAVV, WMMY and WIXI in Fort Myers, Florida
- WFRE in Frederick, Maryland
- KLTA and KKNU in Fresno, California
- WYPC in Gallipolis, Ohio
- WOOD-FM in Grand Rapids, Michigan
- WGLD in Greensboro, North Carolina
- WBAQ in Greenville, Mississippi
- WNCT in Greenville, North Carolina
- WMUU-FM and WBFM in Greenville, South Carolina
- WWMD and WKSL in Hagerstown, Maryland
- WRCH and WKSS in Hartford, Connecticut
- KYND-FM, KODA-AM-FM, KXYZ in Houston, Texas
- WRSA-FM in Huntsville, Alabama
- WXTZ-FM in Indianapolis, Indiana
- WKTZ in Jacksonville, Florida
- KCMU (later KCEZ) and KMBR in Kansas City, Missouri
- KONA-FM in Kennewick, Washington
- WFYN in Key West, Florida
- WKPT-FM in Kingsport, Tennessee
- WEZK in Knoxville, Tennessee
- WGAL (later WNCE) in Lancaster, Pennsylvania
- KXTZ, KORK-FM and KRGN in Las Vegas, Nevada
- KPOL-AM-FM, KNOB, KJOI, KOST and KBIG-FM in Los Angeles, California
- WVEZ in Louisville, Kentucky
- KTMT-FM and KCMX-FM in Medford, Oregon
- WDBN in Medina, Ohio (served Akron, Canton, and Cleveland markets)
- WEZI in Memphis, Tennessee
- WLYF in Miami, Florida
- WTMJ-FM, WISN-FM and WEZW in Milwaukee, Wisconsin
- WAYL and KEEY in Minneapolis-Saint Paul
- WREZ in Montgomery, Alabama
- WZEZ in Nashville, Tennessee
- WVNJ in Newark, New Jersey
- WKCI-FM in New Haven, Connecticut
- WBFM/WPIX, WTFM and WRFM in New York City
- KNPT-FM in Newport, Oregon
- WMFQ in Ocala, Florida
- WDBO-FM and WSSP in Orlando, Florida
- KWXY in Palm Springs, California
- WPAT-AM-FM in Paterson, New Jersey
- WMEZ in Pensacola, Florida
- WEAZ and WDVR (later WEAZ-FM) and WQAL (later WWSH) in Philadelphia, Pennsylvania
- KRFM (later KQYT), KMEO-FM and KDOT in Phoenix, Arizona
- WKJF (later WKOI and WJOI) and WSHH in Pittsburgh, Pennsylvania
- KXL-FM, KUPL-FM, KJIB and KQFM in Portland, Oregon
- WHJY and WLKW-AM-FM in Providence, Rhode Island
- WTVR in Richmond, Virginia
- WPVR in Roanoke, Virginia
- WEZO in Rochester, New York
- KAER, KCTC and KEWT in Sacramento, California
- WGER in Saginaw, Michigan
- KLUB-FM and KSL-FM in Salt Lake City, Utah
- KQXT in San Antonio, Texas
- KSDO, K-JOY, KFMB-FM and XTRA in San Diego, California
- KOIT-FM, KABL-AM-FM and KFOG in San Francisco, California
- KEUT, KIXI-AM-FM, KEZX, KSEA and KBRD in Seattle-Tacoma
- WJYW in Southport, North Carolina
- WSPA in Spartanburg, South Carolina
- KXLY-FM in Spokane, Washington
- KCFM, KRCH and KEZK in St. Louis, Missouri
- WMLO in Tallahassee, Florida
- WFLA-FM, WDUV and WWBA-FM in Tampa/St. Petersburg
- WLQR in Toledo, Ohio
- WGAY-FM in Washington, D.C.
- WWYZ in Waterbury, Connecticut
- WEAT in West Palm Beach, Florida
- KUEZ in Yakima, Washington

=== International broadcasters related to BM/EZ ===
- Radio Enciclopedia (CMBX / CMBR) in Havana, Cuba
- Fine Music Sydney, Sydney, Australia

== See also ==
- Easy listening
- Light music
- Sentimental ballad
- Lounge music
- Adult standards
- Middle of the road (music)
- Soft rock
- Adult contemporary
- Contemporary Hit Radio
- Adult Top 40
- Smooth jazz
- Elevator music
- Muzak
- Background music

== General references ==
- Lanza, Joseph (1994). ""Beautiful Music" The Rise of Easy-Listening FM". Elevator Music: A Surreal History of Muzak, Easy-Listening and Other Moodsong. New York: St. Martin's Press. pp. 167–182. ISBN 0312105401.
- Whetmore, Edward Jay (1992). "Beautiful Music: Life in the Slow Lane". American Electric: Introduction to Telecommunications and Electronic Media. New York: McGraw-Hill Inc. pp. 72–74. ISBN 0070699984.
- Mims, Bruce (2010). "Easy Listening/Beautiful Music Format". In Sterling, Christopher H. (ed.). The Concise Encyclopedia of American Radio. New York: Routledge. pp. 245–247. ISBN 9780415995337.
