= WCRJ =

Jacksonville, Florida; United States
- Broadcast area: Jacksonville area
- Frequency: 88.1 MHz (HD Radio)
- Branding: The JOY FM 88.1

Programming
- Format: Contemporary Christian
- Subchannels: HD2: Christian worship HD3: Christian hip hop

Ownership
- Owner: Radio Training Network

History
- First air date: 1984; 42 years ago
- Former call signs: WNCM (1984–1993); WNCM-FM (1993–2004)

Technical information
- Licensing authority: FCC
- Facility ID: 48390
- Class: C3
- ERP: 8,000 watts
- HAAT: 194 meters (636 ft)
- Transmitter coordinates: 30°16′34.00″N 81°33′53″W

Links
- Public license information: Public file; LMS
- Webcast: Listen Live
- Website: florida.thejoyfm.com

WCRJ (88.1 FM, "The JOY FM") is a Christian radio station in Jacksonville, Florida. Owned by Radio Training Network, it broadcasts a contemporary Christian format as part of its The JOY FM network, which broadcasts in multiple different cities throughout the southeast United States.

== History ==
Prior to 1993, WCRJ was WNCM-FM. The station switched from country music to talk radio in 1995.

88.1 was originally owned by The River Educational Media; until 2011, it was home to The Promise, which was first launched by Concord Media Group on 106.5 FM and was later purchased by Salem Communications. Salem then sold the signal to Cox Radio in 2006 (in which they flipped that station to a simulcast of WOKV-FM, now WHJX), and The River agreed to take the Promise name and format, under a lease management agreement with The Promise Educational Media Inc.

In 2011, The River sold WCRJ to the Educational Media Foundation, which switched the station to its satellite-based K-Love network on May 1, 2011, and then to its Air1 network a few years later.

On August 1, 2018, after being sold to Radio Training Network, WCRJ flipped from the EMF's Air1 network to RTN's state-wide The JOY FM network.
