= Nedungadi Bank =

Indian bank

Nedungadi Bank was the first private sector commercial bank to be set up in South India. Appu Nedungadi established the bank in 1899, in Kozhikode, Malabar District, British India (present day Kozhikode, Kerala, India).

The bank was incorporated on 29 May 1913.

In 1964, the Nedungadi Bank acquired the Cochin National Bank in Thrissur, and in 1965, took selected assets and liabilities from the Coimbatore National Bank in Coimbatore.

Over time, Nedungadi established 174 branches, including branches at all major metropolitan cities such as New Delhi, Kolkata, Chennai, Mumbai, Ahmedabad, etc.

In 2002, the Joint Parliamentary Committee (JPC) probing a stock scam pointed out discrepancies in the conduct of business by Nedungadi Bank. In 2003, the Punjab National Bank took over Nedungadi. At the time of the merger with PNB, Nedungadi Bank's shares had zero value, with the result that its shareholders received no payment for their shares.
