= New Bank of India =

Public sector bank in India(now defunct)

New Bank of India was established in 1936, in Lahore by Mulk Raj Kohli, a professor of Economics turned banker. It moved its head office to Amritsar in 1947, and then to New Delhi in 1956. It acquired Didwana Industrial Bank in 1965, Chawla Bank in 1969, and Sahukara Bank in 1971. Earlier New Bank of India had acquired Punjab & Kashmir Bank.

The bank was established in 1968 as a private sector bank and was nationalised in 1980 during the second phase of bank nationalisation in India.

- Didwana Industrial Bank had been established in 1925 in Didwana.
- Chawla Bank, which had been established in 1913, had its registered office in Bannu, North Western Frontier Province, and a branch office at Dehra Dun in the United Provinces. Ninety-five percent of its depositors and creditors migrated to India after Partition.
- Sahukara Bank, est. 1912 in Ludhiana, had branches in Pakistan that it lost at Partition.
- Lala Gokul Chand Suri founded Punjab & Kashmir Bank in 1912 in Delhi with operations in Rawalpindi.

The Government of India nationalized New Bank of India in 1980. Punjab National Bank acquired New Bank of India in 1993.
