= PNB Housing Finance =

Indian housing finance company

PNB Housing Finance Ltd
- Type: Public
- Traded as: NSE: PNBHOUSING; BSE: 540173
- Industry: Financial services, Housing Finance Company (HFC), BFSI
- Founded: 11 November 1988
- Headquarters: New Delhi, India
- Number of locations: 300 branches (2025)
- Area served: India
- Key people: Jatul Anand (Executive Director); Vinay Gupta (Chief Financial Officer); Krishna Kant (Chief Compliance Officer); Anubhav Rajput (Chief Technology Officer)
- Products: Home Loans, Mortgage loan, Home Improvement Loans, Home Construction Loans, Plot Loans, Home Extension Loans, Land Loans, Loan Against Property, Lease Rental Discounting, Fixed Deposits
- Revenue: ▲₹7,057 crore (US$750 million) (2024)
- Operating income: ▲₹1,954 crore (US$210 million) (2024)
- Net income: ▲₹1,508 crore (US$160 million) (2024)
- Total assets: ▲₹72,405 crore (US$7.7 billion) (2024)
- Number of employees: ~1690 (2023)
- Website: www.pnbhousing.com

PNB Housing Finance Limited (PNB Housing) is an Indian housing finance company. It was incorporated in 1988 as a subsidiary of Punjab National Bank (PNB) headquartered in New Delhi. PNB Housing's primary retail provides housing loans & loan against property as a part of its product portfolio and also holds the license to accept public deposits. The company's equity shares are listed on National Stock Exchange of India (NSE) and Bombay Stock Exchange since November 2016.

PNB Housing Finance operates a nationwide network of 356 branches across India.

Punjab National Bank serves as the company's promoter, holding a 28.1% equity stake.

== History ==
PNB Housing Finance was incorporated under the Companies Act, 1956 and commenced its operations on 11 November 1988 as a wholly owned subsidiary of Punjab National Bank (PNB). In 2001, it registered with National Housing Bank (NHB).

On 9 December 2009, PNB entered into a strategic partnership with Destimoney Enterprises Private Limited (DEPL) and sold its 26% stake to DEPL. DEPL which held 49% shares in the company until February 2015 sold its entire shareholding to Quality Investments Holdings, which is owned by Carlyle Group, a global investment firm. The remaining 51% was owned by the parent bank i.e. Punjab National Bank.

In November 2016, the Company came out with a public issue of equity shares. Its equity shares are listed on National Stock Exchange (NSE) and Bombay Stock Exchange (BSE) with effect from 7 November 2016. Post the public issue, the promoters jointly hold 76% of shared in the company and the public shareholding stands at 24%.

On 30 March 2019, Punjab National Bank announced that it had signed an agreement to sell a 13.01% stake in PNB Housing Finance to private equity firm General Atlantic and alternative investment firm Varde Partners for ₹1,851.60 crore (US$200 million).

== Awards & Recognitions ==
In 2026, the company received several industry awards, including Fintech Innovation Award for Fastest Growing Housing Finance, National Feather Awards (Most Trusted Housing Finance Brand).

In 2025, they won ET Now Progressive Places to Work, Asia Leadership Awards 2024 (Impeccable Leader of the Year).

== Operations ==
PNB Housing Finance maintains over 37 years of operation history in the Indian Housing Finance sector.

As of 2026, the company reported a toal Assets Under Management (AUM) of ₹80,397 crore and a loan asset base of ₹75,765 crore.

The institution services over 3,30,000 active loan accounts across its retail and corporate segments. The bank has 356 branches across India.

The firm utilizes a network of over 14,000 channel partners to facilitate loan originations and public deposit acquisitions.

Across PNB Housing Finance Limited and its subsidiary PHFL Home Loans and services limited, the enterprise employs over 6,500 personnel.
