= WSVE =

Radio station in Jacksonville, Florida

DWSVE
- Jacksonville, Florida; United States
- Broadcast area: Jacksonville, Florida
- Frequency: 1280 kHz

Programming
- Language: English
- Format: Defunct (was Black gospel)

Ownership
- Owner: Rev. Levi Willis, Sr.; (Willis & Sons)

History
- First air date: August 1948
- Last air date: 2004
- Former call signs: WIVY (1948–1976); WEXI (1976–1985); WXOJ (1985-March 14, 1987); WSVE (March 14, 1987–June 24, 2004)

Technical information
- Facility ID: 10519
- Class: D
- Power: 5,000 watts daytime 133 watts nighttime

WSVE was a radio station licensed in Jacksonville, Florida. WSVE was owned by Willis & Sons. WSVE last operated on 1280 kHz with 5,000 watts of power daytime & 133 watts nighttime.

== History ==
=== As WIVY ===
WIVY started broadcasting on 1050 kilohertz in August 1948. Its initial power was 1,000 watts, daytime only. It was affiliated with MacGregor, World & Hearst's INS. In 1971 it held a construction permit to move to 1280 kHz and in increase power from 1,000 watts daytime-only to 5,000 watts daytime-only. It also spawned WIVY-FM/102.9 in 1965. It changed callsigns to WEXI circa 1976.

=== As WEXI ===
When WIVY changed calls to WEXI, WIVY-FM remained under its old callsign. WIVY/1280 aired a contemporary music format. It switched to all-news by 1978. WEXI became WXOZ circa 1985.

=== Willis & Sons ===
Bishop Levi Willis, Sr.'s Willis & Sons, Inc. bought the station on July 14, 1986. It was by then WXOZ with a children's educational format. On March 14, 1987 it became WSVE.

=== Leaving the air ===
Stemming from a 1999 FCC investigation, Willis was fined over $84,000 in fines from the regulatory agency. Partially to satisfy this debt, Willis agreed to surrender the licenses of 4 stations: WSVE, WCRY, KVLA and KLRG. Of those 4 stations, KLRG is still on the air under different ownership.
