= West Bengal Gramin Bank =

Regional Rural Bank in West Bengal, India

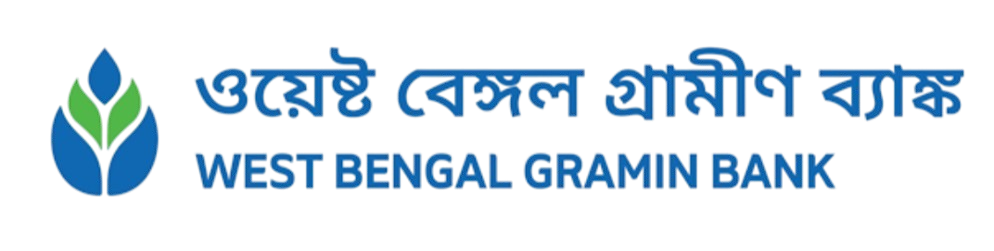
- Native name: ওয়েষ্ট বেঙ্গল গ্রামীণ ব্যাঙ্ক
- Type: Regional Rural Bank
- Industry: Financial; Regional Rural Banks
- Predecessor: Bangiya gramin vikash bank; Paschim banga gramin bank; Uttarbanga kshetriya gramin bank
- Founded: May 1, 2025; 16 months ago
- Headquarters: Kolkata, West Bengal, India
- Number of locations: 960 Branches
- Area served: West Bengal
- Key people: Shri Alok Kumar Goel (Chairman)
- Services: Financial services; Banking
- Owner: Government of India (50%) Government of West Bengal (15%) Punjab National Bank (35%)
- Parent: Ministry of Finance, Government of India
- Website: wbgb.bank.in; ibanking.wbgb.bank.in

The West Bengal Gramin Bank (WBGB) is an Indian Regional Rural Bank (RRB) in West Bengal established on 1 May 2025. The bank was formed by the amalgamation of three rural banks in the state of West Bengal, India namely Bangiya Gramin Vikash Bank, Paschim Banga Gramin Bank, Uttar Banga Kshetriya Gramin Bank , sponsored by Punjab National Bank, UCO Bank and Central Bank of India under The "One State, One RRB" policy of government. It currently has 960 branches in rural areas of West Bengal. It functions under Regional Rural Banks' Act 1976 and is sponsored by Punjab National Bank.

== History ==
=== Bangiya Gramin Vikash Bank ===
Bangiya Gramin Vikash Bank (BGVB) was a regional rural bank in India, operating in West Bengal. It was established with the amalgamation of Mallabhum Gramin Bank, Gaur Gramin Bank, Murshidabad Gramin Bank, Nadia Gramin Bank and Sagar Gramin Bank in 2007. and was sponsored by Punjab National Bank.

=== Paschim Banga Gramin Bank ===
Paschim Banga Gramin Bank(PBGB) was a premier regional rural bank in India. It is under the ownership of Ministry of Finance, Government of India. It was established on 26 February 2007 in exercise of the powers conferred by Sub-section (1) of Section 23A of the Regional Rural Bank Act, 1976 (21 of 1976). The bank was established by the amalgamation of Howrah Gramin Bank, Bardhaman Gramin Bank and Mayurakshi Gramin Bank. This bank was sponsored by UCO Bank and owned by the government of India, the government of West Bengal and UCO Bank. The bank's head office was located at Tikiapara, Howrah, West Bengal.

=== Uttarbanga Kshetriya Gramin Bank ===
Uttarbanga Kshetriya Gramin Bank(UBKGB), was a regional rural bank in India sponsored by Central Bank of India, was established on the 7th March 1977 under the Provision of Section 3(2) of RRB Act 1976 [ 21 of 1976] with equity participation of Government of India (50%). Its head office was located in Coochbehar.

== See also ==
- List of banks in India
- Regional rural bank
- Banking in India
- Reserve Bank of India
- Indian Financial System Code
- Make in India
