= WOKV-FM =

News/talk radio station in Atlantic Beach–Jacksonville, Florida

- Atlantic Beach, Florida; United States
- Broadcast area: Jacksonville metropolitan area
- Frequency: 104.5 MHz (HD Radio)
- Branding: 104.5 WOKV

Programming
- Format: News/talk
- Subchannels: HD2: “X99.5” (Alternative rock)
- Affiliations: Fox News Radio; Compass Media Networks; Premiere Networks; Radio America

Ownership
- Owner: Cox Media Group; (Cox Radio, LLC)
- Sister stations: WAPE-FM; WEZI; WHJX; WJGL; WOKV; WFOX-TV; WJAX-TV

History
- First air date: July 1967
- Former call signs: WAQB-FM (1967–1970); WJNJ-FM (1970–1979); WFYV (1979–1987); WFYV-FM (1987–2013)
- Former frequencies: 104.9 MHz (1967–1979)

Technical information
- Licensing authority: FCC
- Facility ID: 72081
- Class: C
- ERP: 98,800 watts
- HAAT: 309 meters (1,014 ft)
- Transmitter coordinates: 30°16′35.0″N 81°33′51.0″W
- Translator: HD2: 99.5 W258CN (Jacksonville)

Links
- Public license information: Public file; LMS
- Webcast: Listen live; Listen live (via Audacy); Listen live (HD2); Listen live (via Audacy) (HD2)
- Website: www.wokv.com; www.x995jax.com (HD2)

WOKV-FM (104.5 FM) is a commercial radio station licensed to Atlantic Beach, Florida, United States, and serving the Jacksonville metropolitan area. It airs a talk format branded as "News 104.5 WOKV". The station is owned by Cox Media Group, with studios on Central Parkway in the Southside district of Jacksonville. WOKV-FM's transmitter is sited on Hogan Road near Southside Boulevard (Florida State Road 115) in the Southside district. WOKV-FM broadcasts in HD Radio; the HD2 subchannel carries an alternative rock format which feeds FM translator W258CN at 99.5 MHz. WOKV-FM and sister station WOKV-AM both serve as the Primary Entry Point for the Emergency Alert System for the entire First Coast region and Greater Jacksonville metropolitan area.

== History ==
=== WAQB, WJNJ and WFYV ===
The station signed on the air in July 1967 as WAQB-FM and it broadcast on 104.9 MHz. It was the FM counterpart of WKTX (1600 AM). Its effective radiated power was only 3,000 watts, and it simulcast WKTX's middle of the road (MOR) music format. Around 1970, it changed its call letters to WJNJ-FM.

In 1979, the station changed its call sign again, this time to WFYV. Its frequency moved down to 104.5 MHz, coupled with a dramatic boost in power. WFYV began running 100,000 watts, allowing it to be heard throughout Jacksonville's expanding suburbs, from Southeast Georgia to St. Augustine and Gainesville.

=== Album rock and classic rock ===
On March 10, 1980, WFYV became Rock 105 with an album rock format. Over the years, the station gradually shifted towards classic rock. In 2010, following a format change at rival rock station WPLA, WFYV shifted from classic rock to mainstream rock under the name Rock 104.5, Jacksonville's Best Rock. On-air syndicated hosts included Lex and Terry and Bubba The Love Sponge.

On September 24, 2008, WFYV-FM host Gregg Stepp announced he would be leaving the station to take a job in Bakersfield, California, as a program director. Stepp was then asked by WFYV-FM management to create a bit that would bring some attention to the station before announcing the return of popular morning host Doug "The Greaseman" Tracht. Tracht was slated to begin on the Jacksonville airwaves a couple weeks later. Stepp decided to make everyone think he had quit live on-the-air. He would give listeners the idea that station management was planning on firing him but he was quitting before they had the chance. Stepp concluded his bit by saying:

Now, I find out that there's another deal in the works with somebody else and they're only minutes away from handing me my walking papers. Well, here's your 15 second notice: Kiss my ass, Cox Radio Jacksonville, and especially you, Bill Hendrich and David Israel! You two empty suits will be lucky if this is the only time this happens to you, and it's gonna be a bright day in Jacksonville when your desks are emptied and radio is free of you. Now, this shows you how much they're paying attention, by the way, because they should have been in here by now, and if they were really listening to the radio stations and knew what was going on. So, thanks for nothing. Rot in hell, Cox Radio, I am gone!

— Stepp's final words

This was followed by 11 seconds of dead air, then music played. It was revealed much later that Stepp's "quitting" WFYV-FM was merely a stunt.

=== Switch to talk radio ===
On April 10, 2013, Cox Media announced that "Rock 104.5" was going to "retire", effective April 28. On that day, at 10:07 p.m., the station signed off with a live version of "Free Bird" by Lynyrd Skynyrd, followed by a minute of silence. After that, the station began stunting with a 5-minute loop of teasers of potential formats: hot talk as "Raw Talk, 104.5 The Bone", soft AC as "Easy 104.5", country music as "104.5 Brad-FM", urban contemporary as "Power 104.5" and Spanish tropical music as "Caliente 104.5". During the stunting, rock listeners were redirected to alternative rock sister station WXXJ (then at 102.9 FM, now 106.5 FM).

Previous logo

The stunting lasted until midnight on May 1, 2013. At that point, WFYV-FM changed to a simulcast of news/talk-formatted WOKV 690 AM, abandoning all music entirely. WOKV had previously been heard at FM on 106.5 MHz. On May 16, 2013, WFYV-FM changed its call sign to WOKV-FM.

The FM and AM frequencies remained simulcasting until January 2, 2019. On that day, WOKV AM flipped to sports as an ESPN Sports Radio Network affiliate.

== Programming ==
Weekdays on WOKV-FM begin with Jacksonville's Morning News with Rich Jones. The show features interviews with news, sports, weather and traffic updates. The rest of the weekday schedule is nationally syndicated conservative talk programs. Hosts include Brian Kilmeade, Erick Erickson, Sean Hannity, Chad Benson, Jimmy Failla and Coast to Coast AM with George Noory.

Weekends feature programs on money, health, guns, gardening, home repair and the syndicated Sunday Night with Bill Cunningham. Some weekend hours are paid brokered programming. Nights and weekends, most hours begin with an update from Fox News Radio.

== HD Radio ==
WOKV-FM broadcasts using HD Radio technology. With radios that are HD equipped, listeners can receive a digital subchannel, branded as "X 99.5." This station carries an Alternative rock format and also broadcasts on FM translator W258CN at 99.5 FM. This format was previously broadcast on 106.5 WXXJ as "X 106.5", before swapping frequencies with its sister station "Hot 99.5."

Hot 99.5 previously broadcast on the HD2 subchannel and the 99.5 translator. But on August 31, 2023, the station and "X 106.5" swapped frequencies. Hot 99.5 moved to 106.5, rebranding as "Hot 106.5" and changing the call sign to WHJX.
