= Doug Tracht =

Former American DJ (born 1950)

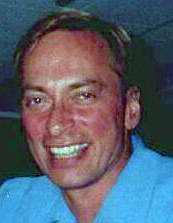
- Born: Douglas A. Tracht; August 1, 1950 (age 76); The Bronx, New York, U.S.
- Other name: The Greaseman
- Presenting career
- Show: Web based
- Station: getalife.tv (inactive)
- Style: Drive time, shock jock
- Country: United States
- Previous show: The Greaseman Show
- Website: greaseman.org

Doug Tracht (born August 1, 1950) is a former American radio, television, and movie personality, nicknamed "The Greaseman". A shock jock, on multiple occasions he drew substantial backlash for making racist jokes on the air.

== Early life and education ==
Tracht was born on August 1, 1950, and grew up in the South Bronx with his younger sister, Diana, and parents, Alfred and Gertrude Tracht. His father was a native New Yorker, who sold dental supplies; his mother was a Lutheran immigrant from Germany who stayed home to raise her two children until they were in high school, then became an educator.

Tracht attended DeWitt Clinton High School, graduating in 1968. He majored in broadcasting at Ithaca College and landed a job at the college radio station. Tracht got a job at WTKO, a low-power top-40 station in Ithaca. The following year, he had moved up to night DJ at a larger station, WENE, in Binghamton, New York. Tracht graduated from Ithaca College in 1972 and married Marie Massara, who was the sales secretary at WENE.

== Nickname ==
The Greaseman pseudonym originated while Tracht was in college:

In those days of top 40, everybody who was on the radio was 'cookin'; cookin' with the Temptations, cookin' Four Tops, that kind of thing. Which meant they were really rockin'. One day I said I was cookin' with heavy grease. It was my way of saying I was out-cookin' the other guys. I said it enough times, so one day one of the other deejays referred to me as the Greaseman.

Tracht's radio name had previously been Dougie T.

== Career ==
=== Early career ===
Tracht went through a string of stations including WAXC in Rochester, New York, WRC in Washington, D.C., and WPOP in Hartford, Connecticut. He lost his job at WPOP when that station switched its format from pop music to all-news in 1975. Amid the frequent moves from city to city, his first marriage ended after less than two years.

=== Success ===
Tracht found a home at WAPE in Jacksonville, Florida, in August 1975 and became a major radio personality in northeast Florida. While in Jacksonville, his true identity was kept confidential, which the station turned into a marketing ploy. Curtains were hung in the window of the broadcast booth, a TV interview showed only his lips, and Tracht wore a gorilla costume at personal appearances.

He was an early shock jock, but Tracht denies the label: "I'm telling jokes. The bottom line — it's a comedy show." "I'm creating characters and stories, I'm weaving a tapestry of humor. The others are just saying nasty things."

On May 25, 1979, Tracht gained national attention when he mocked convicted murderer John Spenkelink, who was due to be executed in "Old Sparky," the Florida State Prison electric chair, that day. Tracht aired a recording of sizzling bacon and dedicated it to Spenkelink, telling him to get used to the sound.

Tracht remained in Jacksonville almost seven years, then moved in 1982 to WWDC-FM in Washington, D.C., where he replaced Howard Stern. DC-101 was his first FM station. He purchased a home in nearby Potomac, Maryland, continued working out, and overcame his dislike of public appearances. During that time, he was known for a series of publicity stunts, including his "presidential campaign" in 1984.

=== Martin Luther King Day comment ===
In January 1986, Tracht prompted outrage by joking about the new federal holiday, Martin Luther King Day. "Why don't we shoot four more and get the whole week off?" he said on air. He was suspended from the station for five days and publicly apologized. The Washington Post noted that he was the highest-paid DJ in D.C. during 1987, making $400,000 a year.

=== Syndication ===
His show was syndicated by Infinity Broadcasting Corporation for five years, from January 1993 until January 1998. Tracht moved to Los Angeles, where his show was aired on KLOS; it was also carried by stations in Atlanta, New York, Philadelphia, Baltimore, and Washington, among others. In 1994, his audience was estimated at 2.5 million daily listeners.

Syndication was not as successful as Infinity had hoped, so the contract was not extended beyond five years. In the last year of his Infinity contract, he was hired by WARW-FM for $1 million per year and returned to Washington, D.C., where he again incorporated music into his show.

=== James Byrd comment ===
On February 24, 1999, after a year at WARW (now WIAD), Tracht again made national news for a racist remark. James Byrd Jr. was a Black man murdered in 1998 by three white men -- two of them open white supremacists -- who dragged him behind a pickup truck. The day before the comment, jurors had convicted John William King of Byrd's murder. Tracht played a portion of a song by Lauryn Hill, who had recently been nominated for ten Grammy Awards, and then said: "No wonder people drag them behind trucks." This decision proved catastrophic to his radio career, igniting a firestorm of protest from listeners of all races and leading to his firing from WARW. Tracht later apologized, saying the "experience, compiled with my past transgressions upon racial and human decency, have forever taught me the value of respect and restraint."

=== Later career ===
In February 2000, a station owner in Saint Croix, U.S. Virgin Islands, offered Tracht a DJ job. Tracht intended to make a new start, but when local residents found out about it, they objected. Local politicians talked to the station owner, who was persuaded to rescind the offer.

Tracht had a part in the Discovery Channel's show The FBI Files and appeared in an infomercial for an internet dating site in 2000.

In 2002, Tracht returned to the air from his home studio, broadcasting on WDMV AM 700 (previously WGOP) near Frederick, Maryland, and was soon afterward syndicated to numerous other stations in the region. He then held the morning-show slot on WMET AM 1160 in Gaithersburg, Maryland, until November 2, 2007. The Washington Post has described this period as "six years of broadcasting his morning show on tiny, unknown AM stations with signals so weak they dissolve under the static created by a car's ignition system."

On March 31, 2008, WWDC announced that the Greaseman show would be returning on Saturday mornings beginning April 5, 2008, and that the run would go until October 2008, after Clear Channel decided to have more "music intensive" weekends on DC101.

==== Return to Jacksonville again ====
In January 2008, David Israel, the vice president and general manager of Cox Radio in Jacksonville, brought back Bubba the Love Sponge, who had been fired in 2004 for indecency. When people asked about Tracht, another former Jacksonville radio personality, Israel tracked him down and they began discussing a job in August 2008. On September 29, 2008, during the Bubba the Love Sponge show, it was announced that Tracht would be returning to Jacksonville to do an afternoon show. On August 10, 2010, Tracht was no longer on WFYV's airwaves. This notice was posted on Tracht's website:

"The Grease Show is no longer airing on Rock105 in Jacksonville. Grease has asked that the Branch Doodadians refrain from sending complaints to Rock105 as it won't change anything. He complements [sic] the staff there and said they just decided to go another direction, and there are no hard feelings. His latest ratings were great. Grease vows to find a new place to shriek sooner or later, and is planning to enjoy the rest of his summer and hopes to be back in action soon!"

=== Webcast ===
From 2010 through 2018, Tracht hosted programming on the internet radio station Web Radio Classics from 6 p.m. until midnight Eastern time, with The Greaseman's Ring Dang Doo running from 6 to 10 p.m. and The Greaseman running from 10 p.m. until midnight ET. Web Radio Classics shut down on August 31, 2018. The station and Tracht returned to streaming in 2020.

=== Movies ===
Tracht appeared in two television movies produced by his close friend Brian Dennehy: Jack Reed: A Search For Justice (1994) and Jack Reed: Death And Vengeance (1996).

== Books ==
- Tracht, Doug (November 1, 1997). And They Ask Me Why I Drink. Atria. ISBN 978-0-671-55160-5.
