= WEZI (FM) =

Adult contemporary radio station in Jacksonville, Florida

- Jacksonville, Florida; United States
- Broadcast area: Jacksonville metropolitan area
- Frequency: 102.9 MHz (HD Radio)
- Branding: Easy 102.9

Programming
- Format: Mainstream Adult Contemporary

Ownership
- Owner: Cox Media Group; (Cox Radio, LLC)
- Sister stations: WAPE-FM; WHJX; WJGL; WOKV; WOKV-FM

History
- First air date: November 1, 1965
- Former call signs: WIVY-FM (1965–1997); WMXQ (1997–2009); WXXJ (2009–2017)
- Former frequencies: 106.5 MHz
- Call sign meaning: "Easy"

Technical information
- Licensing authority: FCC
- Facility ID: 53602
- Class: C
- ERP: 100,000 watts (analog); 4,000 watts (digital)
- HAAT: 309 meters (1,014 ft)
- Transmitter coordinates: 30°16′34.00″N 81°33′53.00″W

Links
- Public license information: Public file; LMS
- Webcast: Listen live Listen live (via Audacy)
- Website: www.easy1029.com

WEZI (102.9 FM, "Easy 102.9") is a commercial radio station licensed to Jacksonville, Florida, United States, featuring a mainstream adult contemporary format. It is owned by Cox Media Group with studios on Central Parkway in Jacksonville's Southside district.

The transmitter is off Hogan Road in the Arlington neighborhood. WEZI's signal stretches from the Georgia coast to south of St. Augustine to Gainesville to the southwest.

== History ==
=== WIVY-FM ===
The station signed on as WIVY-FM on November 1, 1965. At first, it ran at 28,900 watts, less than a third of its current power. It was the sister station to WIVY, which was a daytimer, so the FM station allowed WIVY's programming to be heard around the clock. Both stations were owned by New York announcer Ed Bell Oberle. The following year the stations were sold to Alumni Radio, Inc.

In 1971, the stations were acquired by another New York announcer, Tom Kirby, under the name Jacksonville Broadcasting. He saw FM stations in other cities starting rock formats so he hired a staff of young disc jockeys and switched both stations to album-oriented rock (AOR). (The AM station moved to 1280 kHz, but remained a daytime-only operation, simulcasting WIVY-FM.)

Kirby sold WIVY-FM in 1976 to Torrid Broadcasting, a subsidiary of Progressive Communications. It flipped to Top 40 hits as "Y-103". In 1985, Gilmore Broadcasting bought the station, boosting the power to 100,000 watts, helping WIVY-FM better cover the expanding Jacksonville radio market. In 1988, J.J. Taylor Communications took over the station, moving the format a bit older to hot adult contemporary music, but still as Y-103.

=== WMXQ ===
In 1998, Capstar purchased the station. It kept the Hot AC format but changed its call sign to WMXQ, with the station also rebranding as "Mix 103."

Capstar sold WMXQ to Cox Radio in 2000. Cox switched the format to all-1980s music on November 1, 2000, calling the station "102.9 The Point".

logo, 2009-2017

=== WXXJ ===
On February 25, 2009, at 5:55 am, Cox flipped WMXQ to alternative rock as "X102.9." The last song on "The Point" was "Don't You (Forget About Me)" by Simple Minds (bookending the format, as it was the first song that launched "The Point"). The first song on "X" was "Chop Suey!" by System of a Down. The station was launched to compete with heritage modern rock station WPLA (now mainstream rock). The WXXJ call sign was adopted on April 7, 2009.

As WXXJ rose in the ratings, it began an offensive against its format rival. The station flew a banner over Metropolitan Park during the last Planetfest and interfered with WPLA's annual "Easter Keg Hunt" by bribing people with $300 for the kegs. WPLA management called police to stop the activity. On August 4, 2010, WPLA ended its alternative rock format, switching to classic hits, leaving WXXJ as the only modern rock station in Jacksonville until 2019.

=== WEZI ===
On November 20, 2017, WXXJ swapped formats and frequencies with sister station WEZI (106.5 FM), adopting that station's soft adult contemporary format and re-branded as "Easy 102.9". At first, "Easy" played all Christmas music, but on December 26, 2017, the Soft AC format resumed on 102.9 FM. The two stations swapped call signs on November 26, 2017.

Over time, WEZI has evolved into a more mainstream adult contemporary format, phasing in more current songs and re-focusing on adult contemporary hits from the 1980s, 1990s, 2000s, 2010s and some more recent 2020s. The station has consistently competed with AC station WEJZ, owned by Renda Broadcasting, as they are often very close in the Nielsen Audio Ratings.

=== Christmas Music ===
In late November 2017, WEZI flipped to all Christmas music for the holidays. This took place during the frequency swap with WXXJ in an apparent attempt to gather attention to the new frequency. Between 2018 and 2023, the station trickled in Christmas songs within the regular format, in the weeks leading up to the holidays, without going fulltime Christmas.

However, in early November 2024, WEZI made a surprise switch to all Christmas music, calling itself "Jacksonville's Home for the Holidays". This competes with 96.1 WEJZ, the long-time Christmas music station in the Jacksonville radio market. In 2025, WEZI opted to mix in Christmas music to their Playlist while doing full time Christmas music on weekends.
