= WAPE-FM =

Contemporary hit radio station in Jacksonville, Florida

- Jacksonville, Florida; United States
- Broadcast area: Jacksonville metro area
- Frequency: 95.1 MHz (HD Radio)
- Branding: 95.1 WAPE

Programming
- Language: English
- Format: Top 40

Ownership
- Owner: Cox Media Group; (Cox Radio, LLC)
- Sister stations: WEZI; WHJX; WJGL; WOKV; WOKV-FM

History
- First air date: 1949
- Former call signs: WJAX-FM (1978–86)
- Call sign meaning: Previously used on the former WAPE (690 AM)

Technical information
- Licensing authority: FCC
- Facility ID: 70863
- Class: C
- ERP: 100,000 watts
- HAAT: 300 meters (980 ft)
- Transmitter coordinates: 30°19′22.00″N 81°38′34.00″W

Links
- Public license information: Public file; LMS
- Webcast: Listen live Listen live (via Audacy)
- Website: www.wape.com

WAPE-FM (95.1 MHz "The Big Ape") is a commercial FM radio station in Jacksonville, Florida. It is owned by Cox Media Group and airs a top 40 radio format. Its transmitter is located in Downtown Jacksonville, off Gator Bowl Boulevard. The studios and offices are located on Central Parkway in Jacksonville's Southside section.

WAPE's effective radiated power is 100,000 watts. WAPE is licensed for HD Radio operations but currently has no secondary channel.

== History ==
In 1949, the station first signed on as WJAX-FM, the FM counterpart to WJAX. The two stations were owned by the City of Jacksonville. They simulcasted their programming, and were NBC Radio Network affiliates. WJAX-FM originally ran at only 7,700 watts, a fraction of its current power. Through the 1950s and 60s, WJAX-AM-FM carried a full service middle of the road music format.

Around 1970, WJAX-FM switched to an album rock format. In the 1970s, WJAX-FM got a power boost to its current 100,000 watts, able to cover Jacksonville and its growing suburbs, from Southeast Georgia down to St. Augustine and Gainesville.

From the mid-1970s until 1986, WJAX-FM was successful as an urban contemporary station. In March 1986, it flipped to a Top 40/urban hybrid format (also known as "CHUrban", which would be the forerunner to what is now rhythmic contemporary) as WAPE-FM under their brand new moniker "Power 95 WAPE". WAPE-FM maintains the legacy of the WAPE call sign and format, which was originally on the AM band at 690 kHz (now WOKV). WAPE-FM was Jacksonville's dominant hit music station from the mid 1980s to the early 1990s.

In 1993, the station's CHUrban format and "Power 95" branding were replaced with a Hot AC format, trying to avoid the oncoming popularity of rap where it would be forced to play it as part of its format, while also excluding hard rock. In 1997, WAPE returned to the Top 40 format.

In 1998, the station was bought by Capstar, Inc., a forerunner of iHeartMedia, Inc. In 2000, WAPE-FM was acquired by Atlanta-based Cox Radio.

WAPE's alumni, from both AM 690 and FM 95.1, include Jay Thomas and Douglas "The Greaseman" Tracht.
