= WHJX =

Urban Adult Contemporary radio station in Ponte Vedra Beach–Jacksonville, Florida

- Ponte Vedra Beach, Florida; United States
- Broadcast area: Jacksonville metro area
- Frequency: 106.5 MHz (HD Radio)
- Branding: Hot 106.5

Programming
- Language: English
- Format: Urban adult contemporary

Ownership
- Owner: Cox Media Group; (Cox Radio, LLC)
- Sister stations: WAPE-FM; WEZI; WJGL; WOKV; WOKV-FM

History
- First air date: September 30, 1996; 29 years ago
- Former call signs: WPVJ (1994–1996); WTLK-FM (1996–1998); WBGB (1998–2006); WOKV-FM (2006–2013); WFYV-FM (2013); WHJX (2013–2015); WEZI (2015–2017); WXXJ (2017–2023)
- Call sign meaning: Hot in Jacksonville

Technical information
- Licensing authority: FCC
- Facility ID: 28894
- Class: A
- ERP: 6,000 watts
- HAAT: 100 meters (330 ft)
- Transmitter coordinates: 30.276°N 81.565°W

Links
- Public license information: Public file; LMS
- Webcast: Listen live Listen live (via Audacy)
- Website: www.hot1065fm.com

WHJX (106.5 MHz) is an FM radio station owned by Cox Media Group. It is licensed to Jacksonville, Florida, and serves the Jacksonville metropolitan area with an urban adult contemporary format. It brands as "Hot 106.5" and was previously heard on WOKV-HD2 and translator W258CN as "Hot 99.5".

WHJX broadcasts with 6,000 watts of both horizontal and vertical power, making it a class A station. The station's offices and studios are located at 8000 Belfort Parkway on the Southside of Jacksonville, and the transmitter tower is in the Arlington district.

== History ==
=== WTLK-FM ===
106.5 MHz was issued a construction permit as WPVJ in July 1994. The station signed on as call sign WTLK-FM on September 30, 1996, and was known as "Real Radio 106.5", with a Hot Talk format. The most notable event during this part of the station's history was the return of The Greaseman to Jacksonville's airwaves. (Ironically, the Greaseman's previous time in Jacksonville had been on WAPE when it was on AM 690 (the current home of WOKV)). The Greaseman Show aired 6-10 a.m. weekdays. Numerous nationally syndicated shows filled the 10 am-noon slot, including hosts Mike Walker, Alan Keyes and Bo Gritz. "The Judy Jarvis Show" aired between noon and 3 pm, The Don and Mike Show from 3-7 p.m., The Tom Leykis Show from 7-10 p.m., "Ferrall on the Bench" with Scott Ferrall from 10 p.m.-1 a.m. and Joey Reynolds aired overnights from 1-6. Weekend programming consisted of classic rock music provided by Westwood One's syndicated "Adult Rock & Roll" format.

=== WBGB ===
WTLK-FM flipped to classic rock at 3 p.m. on January 16, 1998, becoming known as "Big 106.5", and changed to the WBGB call sign in March 1998. At this time, the station was owned by Clear Channel Communications. The format change began with a 10,000 commercial-free song launch that ended on February 18, 1998. That morning, former WPLA and WNZS part-time air personality Randy Clemens became the first live local DJ on the station, with program director Steve Fox handling afternoon drive. The remaining dayparts were filled by Westwood One air talent, including Jeff Gonzer, Terry Gladstone, Tony Scott, Frazer Smith and Mackenzie Rae.

WBGB was divested by Clear Channel, along with sister stations WZNZ, WZAZ, and WJGR, in the fall of 1999 to Concord Media Group. From there, it came under the ownership of Jacor, who in turn sold the station to Caron Broadcasting (a division of Salem Communications) in 2003.

Caron then flipped WBGB to Contemporary Christian, branding the station as "106.5 The Promise". On July 6, 2006, Salem Communications entered into an agreement to sell WBGB to Cox Media Group for $7.7 million in cash. The last day the station broadcast as "The Promise" was September 18, 2006. The format then moved to non-commercial religious broadcaster WCRJ (88.1 FM), which adopted the "Promise" branding, as well as a number of on-air staffers.

On the afternoon of September 19, WBGB began stunting, letting listeners know that The Promise had moved to 88.1, and promising something "new and exciting" to come to 106.5 on Thursday, September 21. The new format of WBGB, a simulcast of talk station WOKV, was revealed on Cox's Investor Relations website on September 20.

=== WHJX ===
On May 1, 2013, the FM simulcast was transferred to 104.5 FM (formerly WFYV-FM). The move expanded its broadcast coverage area from Brunswick, Georgia, south to Daytona Beach, Florida, southwest to Gainesville, Florida, and west to Lake City, Florida. The simulcast on 106.5 FM continued for a short time as the station told listeners about the change. 106.5 FM officially dropped from the simulcast on May 23 at Midnight, and flipped to Urban AC as "Hot 106.5". The new format launched with a marathon playing of 10,000 songs in a row, which began with "P.Y.T." by Michael Jackson. The station changed its call sign to WHJX on the same day.

=== WEZI ===
On September 24, 2015, WHJX began simulcasting on translator W258CN (99.5 FM) as "Hot 99.5", and began redirecting listeners to the new frequency. On September 29, 2015, at Noon, 106.5 FM flipped to soft adult contemporary as "Easy 106.5", with the call sign already changed to WEZI five days prior. Core artists heard on WEZI include Elton John, Whitney Houston, Gloria Estefan and Billy Joel.

=== WXXJ ===
Previous logo

On November 20, 2017, WEZI and sister station WXXJ (102.9 FM) swapped formats, with WEZI becoming alternative rock-formatted "X106.5". The stations swapped call signs on November 26, 2017.

=== WHJX ===
On August 8, 2023, it was announced WXXJ would revert to the urban AC format and "Hot 106.5" branding (along with the return of the WHJX call letters), assuming it from W258CN (99.5 FM)/WOKV-FM-HD2, at 5 p.m. on August 31. The following week, it was announced and confirmed that "X106.5" and the alternative rock format would concurrently move to W258CN/WOKV-FM-HD2 on the same date and time.
