= Punjab National Bank =

Indian public sector bank

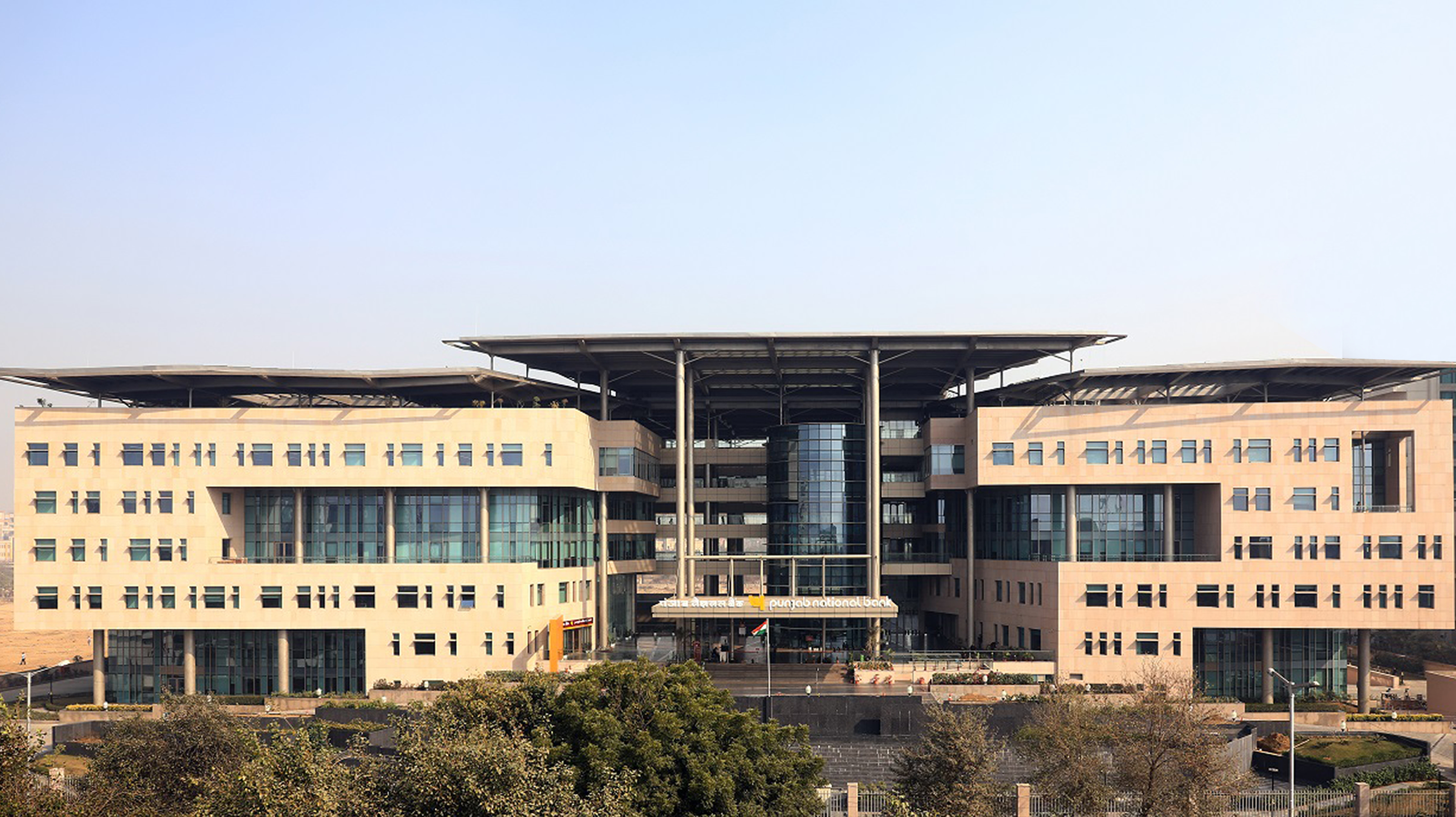
- Headquarters in Dwarka, Delhi
- Type: Public
- Traded as: BSE: 532461; NSE: PNB
- Industry: Banking, Financial services
- Founded: 19 May 1894; 132 years ago
- Founder: Dyal Singh Majithia; Lala Harkishen Lal
- Headquarters: Dwarka, Delhi, India
- Number of locations: 10,189 branches and 11,822 ATMs (2025)
- Key people: K G Ananthakrishnan (Non-Executive Chairman); Ashok Chandra (MD & CEO)
- Products: Retail banking; Corporate banking; Investment banking; Mortgage loans; Private banking; Wealth management; Asset management; Investment management; Credit cards; Insurance
- Revenue: ▲₹132,480 crore (US$14 billion) (2026)
- Operating income: ▲₹29,290 crore (US$3.0 billion) (2026)
- Net income: ▲₹16,904 crore (US$1.8 billion) (2026)
- Total assets: ▲₹1,765,400 crore (US$180 billion) (2026)
- Total equity: ▲₹126,380 crore (US$13 billion) (2026)
- Owner: Government of India (70.08%)
- Number of employees: 102,400 (2026)
- Subsidiaries: PNB MetLife India Insurance Company; PNB Housing Finance Limited; PNB Cards and Services Limited
- Capital ratio: 14.14% (2020)
- Website: pnb.bank.in; ibanking.pnb.bank.in

Punjab National Bank, also known as PNB, is an Indian public sector bank based in New Delhi. Founded in May 1894, the bank has 10,324 branches and 11,065 ATMs as of March 2026.

PNB has a banking subsidiary in the UK (PNB International Bank, with seven branches in the UK), as well as branches in Hong Kong, Kowloon, Dubai, and Kabul. It has representative offices in Almaty (Kazakhstan), Dubai (United Arab Emirates), Shanghai (China), Oslo (Norway), and Sydney (Australia). In Bhutan, it owns 51% of Druk PNB Bank, which has five branches. In Nepal, PNB owns 20% of Everest Bank, which has 122 branches. PNB also owns 41.64% of JSC (SB) PNB Bank in Kazakhstan, which has four branches.

== History ==
Punjab National Bank is a Public Sector Undertakings in India (PSU) working under the Government of India regulated by the Reserve Bank of India Act, 1934 and the Banking Regulation Act, 1949. It was registered on 19 May 1894 under the Indian Companies Act, with its office in Anarkali Bazaar, in pre-independent India (present-day Pakistan). The founding board was drawn from different parts of India professing different faiths and of varying backgrounds, with the common objective of creating a truly national bank that would further the economic interest of the country. PNB's founders included several leaders of the Swadeshi movement such as, Dyal Singh Majithia and Lala Harkishen Lal, Lala Lalchand, Kali Prosanna Roy, E. C. Jessawala, Prabhu Dayal, Bakshi Jaishi Ram, and Lala Dholan Dass. Lala Lajpat Rai was actively associated with the management of the Bank in its early years. The board first met on 23 May 1894. The bank opened for business on 12 April 1895 in Lahore.

PNB is the first Indian bank to have been started solely with Indian capital that survives to the present, as the earlier Oudh Commercial Bank, which was established in 1881, failed in 1958.

Mahatma Gandhi, Jawaharlal Nehru, Lal Bahadur Shastri, Indira Gandhi and the Jalianwala Bagh Committee have held PNB accounts.

=== Timeline ===
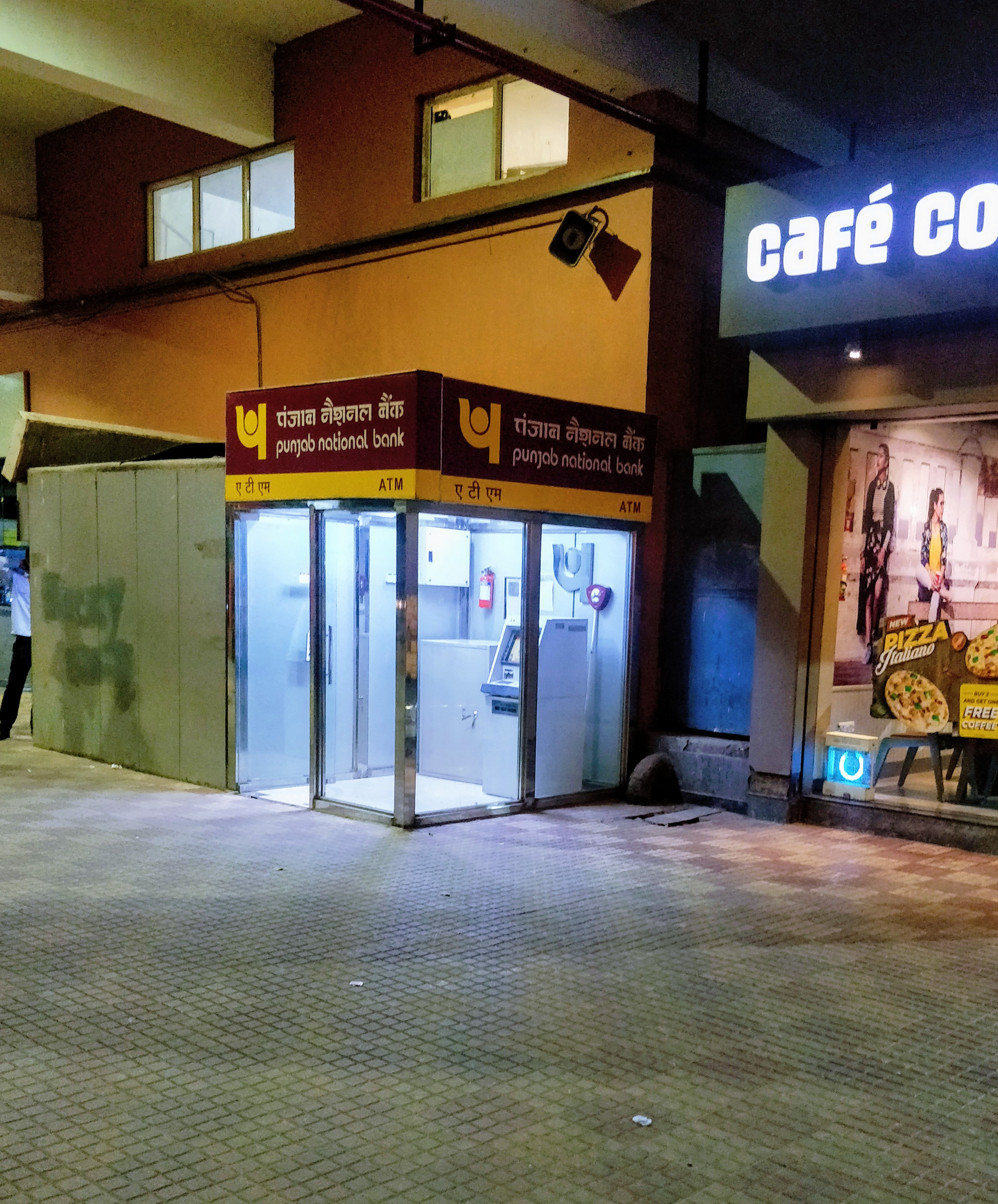
PNB ATM at Moolchand metro station of Delhi Metro, Delhi

In 1900, PNB established its first branch in modern-day Lahore, Pakistan. Branches in Karachi and Peshawar followed. The next major event occurred in 1940 when PNB absorbed Bhagwan (or Bhugwan) Dass Bank, which had its head office in Dehra.

After the Partition of India and the creation of Pakistan, PNB lost its premises in Lahore, but continued to operate in Pakistan. Partition forced PNB to close 92 offices in West Pakistan, one-third of its total number of branches, and which held 40% of the total deposits. PNB still maintained a few caretaker branches. On 31 March 1947, even before Partition, PNB had decided to leave Lahore and transfer its registered office to India; it received permission from the Lahore High Court on 20 June 1947, at which time it established a new head office at Under Hill Road, Civil Lines in New Delhi. Lala Yodh Raj was the Chairman of the Bank.

In 1951, PNB acquired the 39 branches of Bharat Bank (est. 1942). Bharat Bank became Bharat Nidhi Ltd. In 1960, PNB again shifted its head office, this time from Calcutta to Delhi. In 1961, PNB acquired Universal Bank of India, which Ramkrishna Dalmia had established in 1938 in Dalmianagar, Bihar. PNB also amalgamated Indo Commercial Bank (est. 1932 by S. N. N. Sankaralinga Iyer) in a rescue. In 1963, The Burmese revolutionary government nationalised PNB's branch in Rangoon (now Yangon). This became People's Bank No. 7. After the India–Pakistan war of 1965, the government of Pakistan seized all the offices in Pakistan of Indian banks in September 1965. PNB also had one or more branches in East Pakistan (now Bangladesh).

The government of India (GOI) nationalised PNB and 13 other major commercial banks, on 19 July 1969. In 1976 or 1978, PNB opened a branch in London. some ten years later, in 1986, the Reserve Bank of India required PNB to transfer its London branch to State Bank of India after the branch was involved in a fraud scandal. That same year, 1986, PNB acquired Hindustan Commercial Bank (est. 1943) in a rescue. The acquisition added Hindustan's 142 branches to PNB's network. In 1993, PNB acquired New Bank of India, which the GOI had nationalised in 1980. In 1998 PNB set up a representative office in Almaty, Kazakhstan.

In 2003, PNB took over Nedungadi Bank, the oldest private sector bank in Kerala. At the time of the merger with PNB, Nedungadi Bank's shares had zero value, with the result that its shareholders received no payment for their shares. PNB also opened a representative office in London. In 2004, PNB established a branch in Kabul, Afghanistan, a representative office in Shanghai, and another in Dubai. PNB also established an alliance with Everest Bank in Nepal that permits migrants to transfer funds easily between India and Everest Bank's 12 branches in Nepal. Currently, PNB owns 20% of Everest Bank. Two years later, PNB established PNBIL – Punjab National Bank (International) – in the UK, with two offices, one in London, and one in Southall. Since then it has opened more branches, this time in Leicester, Birmingham, Ilford, Wembley, and Wolverhampton. PNB also opened a branch in Hong Kong. In January 2009, PNB established a representative office in Oslo, Norway. PNB hopes to upgrade this to a branch in due course. In January 2010, PNB established a subsidiary in Bhutan. PNB owns 51% of Druk PNB Bank, which has branches in Thimphu, Phuntsholing, and Wangdue. Local investors own the remaining shares. Then on 1 May, PNB opened its branch in Dubai's financial center. PNB purchased a small minority stake in Kazakhstan-based JSC Danabank established on 20 October 1992 in Pavlodar. Within the year PNB increased its ownership till 84% of what has become JSC (SB) PNB, with its share currently decreased to 49%. The associate in Kazakhstan now called JSC Tengri Bank has branches in Almaty, Nur-Sultan, Karaganda, Pavlodar and Shymkent. September 2011: PNB opened a representative office in Sydney, Australia. December 2012: PNB signed an agreement with US based life Insurance company MetLife to acquire a 30% stake in MetLife's Indian affiliate MetLife India Limited. The company would be renamed PNB MetLife India Limited and PNB would sell MetLife's products in its branches.

== Mergers and acquisitions ==
Acquisition date	Company	Location	Ref.
1951	Bharat Bank Ltd.	New Delhi, India	
1961	Universal Bank of India	Dalmianagar, Bihar, India	
1962	Indo-Commercial Bank	India	
1986	Hindustan Commercial Bank	India	
1993	New Bank of India	New Delhi, India	
2003	Nedungadi Bank	Kozhikode, Kerala, India	
2020	Oriental Bank of Commerce	Gurgaon (Head Office)	
2020	United Bank of India	Kolkata (Head Office)	

=== Amalgamation ===
On 30 August 2019, Finance Minister Nirmala Sitharaman announced that the Oriental Bank of Commerce and United Bank of India would be merged with Punjab National Bank. The proposed merger would make Punjab National Bank the second largest public sector bank in the country with assets of ₹17.95 lakh crore (US$190 billion) and 11,437 branches. The Union Cabinet approved the merger on 4 March 2020. PNB announced that its board had approved the merger ratios the next day. Shareholders of Oriental Bank of Commerce and United Bank will receive 1,150 shares and 121 shares of PNB, respectively, for every 1,000 shares of they hold. On 1 April 2020, the merger came into effect. Post-merger, all customers of other two merging banks are now treated as the customers of PNB.

== Listings and shareholding ==
PNB's equity shares are listed on Bombay Stock Exchange and the National Stock Exchange of India. It is a constituent of the Nifty 50 index at the NSE. As of 30 June 2024, the shareholding structure of the bank is as follows.

Shareholder	Percentage
Promoters & Promoter Group	73.15
Domestic institutional investors	10.76
Foreign Institutional Investors	5.51
Public & Other	10.57

== Subsidiaries ==
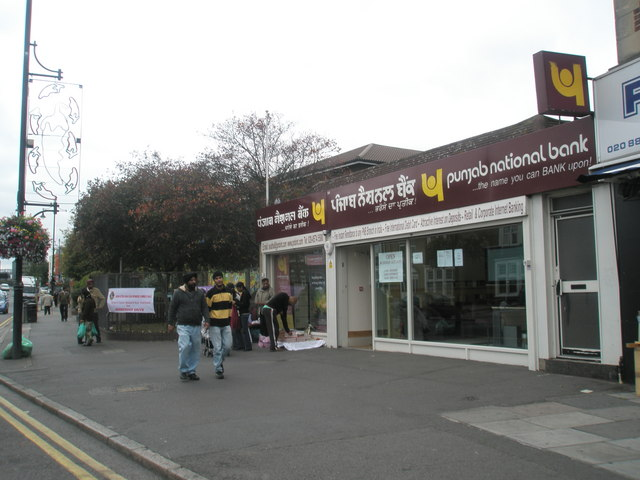
A Punjab National Bank branch in the United Kingdom.

=== Domestic subsidiaries ===
- PNB Gilts Ltd (74.07%)
- PNB Investment Services Ltd (100%)
- PNB Insurance Broking Services Ltd (non functional under winding up)
- PNB Cards and Services Ltd (100%)

=== International subsidiaries ===
- PNB International Ltd UK (100%)
- Druk PNB Bank Ltd Bhutan (51%)

=== Domestic associates ===
- Assam Gramin Bank (35%)
- Bihar Gramin Bank (35%)
- Haryana Gramin Bank (35%)
- Himachal Pradesh Gramin Bank (35%)
- Manipur Rural Bank (35%)
- Punjab Gramin Bank (35%)
- Tripura Gramin Bank (35%)
- West Bengal Gramin Bank (35%)
- PNB Housing Finance Limited (28.10%)
- PNB MetLife India Insurance Company (30%)
- Canara HSBC Life Insurance (23%)

=== International associates ===
- JSC Tengri Bank Kazakhstan (41.64%)

=== International joint venture ===
- Everest Bank Ltd Nepal (20.0249%)

== Employees ==
As of 31 March 2026, the bank had 103,184 employees. As of 31 March 2019, it also had 1,722 employees with disabilities on the same date (2.43%). The average age of bank employees on the same date was 39 years. The bank reported the business of ₹29.42 crore (US$3.1 million) per employee and net profit of ₹17.47 lakh (US$18,000) per employee during the FY 2025–26.

== Corporate social responsibility ==
The bank incurred ₹3.24 crore (US$340,000) on corporate social responsibility activities like medical camps, farmer training, tree plantations, blood donation camps etc. during the FY 2012–13.

For the financial year 2018–2019, PNB incurred a sum of ₹2,954.15 lakh (US$3.1 million) on CSR initiatives. Among many initiatives, one such effort is PNB Ladli, which started in 2014. The scheme initiated to promote education among girls of Rural / Semi-urban areas.

During the year 2018–19, PNB has also taken the initiative for donations to CM relief fund for Kerala and Kumbh Mela.

For the year FY25-26, PNB has initiated ₹1,294.71 for RSETIs.

To help young talents in India, the bank also initiated PNB Hockey Academy, one of the major efforts towards supporting the national games.

== Controversies ==
=== Punjab National Bank Fraud Case, 2018 ===
PNB disclosed in February 2018 that it detected fraudulent transactions of up to $1.77 billion.

Nirav Modi, along with his associates and related companies, was accused of organizing a major fraud. In 2018, Interpol issued a Red notice for Modi on charges including criminal conspiracy, breach of trust, cheating, corruption, and money laundering.

In March 2019, British authorities arrested Modi in central London.

=== Fake Currency Case, 2026 ===
In August 2026, counterfeit Indian currency notes with a face value of Rs. 17.29 crore were recovered from a PNB currency chest in Saharanpur, Uttar Pradesh. Following an initial investigation that led to the suspension of three bank officials, the NIA took over the probe in September 2026. The agency arrested the manager of the currency chest along with a contractual driver in connection with the alleged movement and substitution of the counterfeit notes.

=== ED raids in Telangana ===
On 23 October 2026, the Enforcement Directorate (ED) raided seven places in Telangana over Rs 326.49 crore bank fraud case. The areas involved Hyderabad, Secunderabad and Medchal-Malkajgiri.

== See also ==
- List of bank robbers and robberies § India
- Banking in India
- List of banks in India
- Indian Financial System Code
- List of largest banks
- List of companies of India
- Make in India
- Indian Financial System Code
- List of financial supervisory authorities by country
- Public sector banks in India
