= 690 AM =

AM radio frequency

The following radio stations broadcast on AM frequency 690 kHz: 690 AM is a Canadian and Mexican clear-channel frequency. CKGM Montreal and XEWW Tijuana share Class A status of 690 kHz.

== In Argentina ==
- LRA4 in Salta, Salta.
- LU19 in Cipolletti, Río Negro.

== In Canada ==
Stations in bold are clear-channel stations.

Call sign	City of license	Daytime power (kW)	Nighttime power (kW)	Transmitter coordinates
CBDM	Beaver Creek, Yukon	0.04	0.04	62.3808°N 140.885°W
CBES	Ignace, Ontario	0.04	0.04	49.4136°N 91.6625°W
CBKF-1	Gravelbourg, Saskatchewan	5	5	49.8711°N 106.473°W
CBU	Vancouver, British Columbia	25	25	49.138744°N 123.198774°W
**CKGM**	Montreal, Quebec	50	50	45.2953°N 73.7217°W

== In Colombia ==
- HJCZ: Bogota.

== In Mexico ==
Stations in bold are clear-channel stations.

- XEMA-AM in Buena Vista de Rivera (Fresnillo), Zacatecas
- XEN-AM in Mexico City
- XERG-AM in Guadalupe, Nuevo León
- **XEWW-AM** in Tijuana, Baja California - 77 kW daytime, 50 kW nighttime, transmitter located at 32.297778°N 117.03°W

== In the United States ==
Call sign	City of license	Facility ID	Class	Daytime power (kW)	Nighttime power (kW)	Critical hours power (kW)	Unlimited power (kW)	Transmitter coordinates
KAFN	Benton, Arkansas	4839	D	0.25	0.073			34.5325°N 92.571111°W
KCEE	Cortaro, Arizona	24590	D	0.25	0.003			32.253056°N 110.962222°W
KFXN	Minneapolis, Minnesota	10141	D	1.7	0.005			45.023611°N 93.382778°W
KGGF	Coffeyville, Kansas	34462	B	10	5			37.146389°N 95.478333°W
KHNR	Honolulu, Hawaii	16742	B				10	21.294722°N 157.863611°W
KOLT	Terrytown, Nebraska	67472	D	1	0.075			41.848611°N 103.667222°W
KPET	Lamesa, Texas	71649	B				0.25	32.7075°N 101.936389°W
KRCO	Prineville, Oregon	27171	D	1	0.077			44.341111°N 120.906667°W
KSTL	St. Louis, Missouri	73300	D	1	0.018			38.616944°N 90.171389°W
KTSM	El Paso, Texas	69561	B	10	10			31.969722°N 106.354167°W
KWRP	Pueblo, Colorado	69871	D	0.25	0.024			38.296667°N 104.646389°W
WADS	Ansonia, Connecticut	54481	D	3.2				41.346111°N 73.114167°W
WELD	Fisher, West Virginia	60923	D	3	0.014	0.5		39.052222°N 79.005833°W
WJOX	Birmingham, Alabama	16897	B	50	0.5			33.448889°N 86.921667°W (daytime); 33.450556°N 86.922222°W (nighttime)
WNZK	Dearborn Heights, Michigan	5348	B	2.5				42.098611°N 83.33°W
WOKV	Jacksonville, Florida	53601	B	50	25			30.132222°N 81.7°W (daytime); 30.307778°N 81.939722°W (nighttime)
WPHE	Phoenixville, Pennsylvania	58738	D	1				40.135556°N 75.560278°W
WQNO	New Orleans, Louisiana	74090	B	9.1	2.1			29.963333°N 89.958611°W
WVCY	Oshkosh, Wisconsin	69836	D	0.25	0.077			44.080833°N 88.564722°W
WZAP	Bristol, Virginia	55004	D	10	0.014			36.630833°N 82.159167°W

== In Uruguay ==
- CX 8 Radio Sarandí in Montevideo
