= WJKV =

- Jacksonville, Florida; United States
- Broadcast area: Jacksonville metropolitan area
- Frequency: 90.9 MHz (HD Radio)

Programming
- Language: English
- Format: Contemporary Christian
- Subchannels: HD2: Air1 (Contemporary worship music); HD3: Radio Nueva Vida (Spanish-language Christian); HD4: American Family Radio (WKTZ)
- Network: K-Love

Ownership
- Owner: Educational Media Foundation

History
- First air date: October 3, 1972 (53 years ago)
- Former call signs: WFAM (1972–1985); WKTZ-FM (1985–2015)
- Former frequencies: 91.1 MHz (1973–1980s)
- Call sign meaning: Jacksonville's K-love

Technical information
- Licensing authority: FCC
- Facility ID: 31936
- Class: C2
- ERP: 41,000 watts
- HAAT: 166 meters (545 ft)
- Transmitter coordinates: 30°16′36″N 81°33′47″W
- Translator: See § Translators

Links
- Public license information: Public file; LMS
- Webcast: Listen Live
- Website: klove.com

WJKV (90.9 FM) is a non-profit radio station in Jacksonville, Florida. It is owned by the Educational Media Foundation (EMF) and airs the national "K-Love" Christian contemporary music radio format.

WJKV broadcasts from a tower off Hogan Road in Jacksonville. In addition, programming on the station is also heard on two translator stations: W208AV 89.5 MHz, San Jose (a neighborhood in Jacksonville), and W252DJ 98.3 MHz, licensed to Jacksonville Beach.

WJKV has been observed with HD1, HD2 ("Air1") and HD3 services in December 2018.

== History ==
On October 3, 1972, the station signed on as WFAM, at 91.1 MHz. It was owned by Jones College. WFAM had a different radio format for each part of the day. In the morning it played classical music, afternoons it was Top 40 and in the evening it was Jacksonville's only jazz station. The students staffed the station as part of their classes in broadcasting. By 1983, it was all-jazz. In the 1980s, the station moved its frequency to 90.9 and also got a boost in power and coverage area.

In 1986, after easy listening station 96.1 WKTZ-FM switched to soft adult contemporary WLSC (now WEJZ), Jones College decided to acquire the intellectual property of WKTZ-FM and its call sign. The new 90.9 WKTZ-FM would continue playing its soft, instrumental music, but as a non-commercial, listener-supported radio station.

As one of the last remaining beautiful music stations, WKTZ-FM had a loyal and devoted audience, which grew nationally after the advent of streaming via the internet on its website. Its AM counterpart, 1220 WKTZ, was also acquired by Jones College. It carried a syndicated adult standards format.

Facing declining broadcast ratings and the aging of its audience (83 percent of their listeners were over age 55), the stations' licenses were sold to religious broadcaster EMF for $3.375 million. EMF announced plans to re-launch the stations with Christian formats. At 3:30 PM on November 6, 2014, both 90.9 FM and 1220 AM went dark, however the online stream of 90.9's former programming continued under the branding "Jones College Radio". A week later, WKTZ-FM and WKTZ returned to air as members of EMF's K-Love network. On July 21, 2015, WKTZ-FM changed its call letters to WJKV.

On August 1, 2018, EMF's Air1 network began airing on the HD2 subchannel. Air1 also airs on 89.5 FM W208AV.

In response to the sale, public radio station WJCT-FM added an easy listening format to one of its HD Radio subchannels, in an effort to placate WKTZ's former audience.

EMF does not usually operate AM stations; as such, AM 1220 WKTZ was spun off to the American Family Association which airs its national Christian radio format on the station.

== Translators ==
Broadcast translator for WJKV-HD2
| Call sign | Frequency | City of license | FID | ERP (W) | HAAT | Class | FCC info |
|---|---|---|---|---|---|---|---|
| W208DV | 89.5 FM | San Jose, Florida | 91917 | 99 | 181 m (594 ft) | D | LMS |

Broadcast translator for WJKV-HD3
| Call sign | Frequency | City of license | FID | ERP (W) | HAAT | Class | FCC info |
|---|---|---|---|---|---|---|---|
| W252DJ | 98.3 FM | Jacksonville Beach, Florida | 139399 | 110 | 0 m (0 ft) | D | LMS |
