= Jones College (Florida) =

Private college in Jacksonville, Florida (1918–2017)

Coordinates: 30.3278812°N 81.6097152°W

- Former name: Jones Business College
- Type: Private college
- Active: 1918–2017
- Accreditation: ACICS
- President: Mayra Nunez
- Provost: Katherine Dane
- Faculty: 50
- Students: 350
- Location: Jacksonville, Florida, United States
- Colors: White and Blue
- Website: jones.edu

Jones College was a private college in Jacksonville, Florida, United States. Founded in 1918, the college was non-profit and had an undergraduate body of roughly 350 students. It offered courses in business, education, management, medical assistant training, computer science and general studies. The school was not regionally accredited, although it was nationally accredited by the Accrediting Council for Independent Colleges and Schools (ACICS).

On December 12, 2016, John King Jr., the United States Secretary of Education, finalized the process of revoking the U.S. Department of Education's recognition of ACICS as an accreditor. Subsequently, Jones College announced it would close on December 31, 2017. Its last classes were held in August 2017.

== Campuses ==
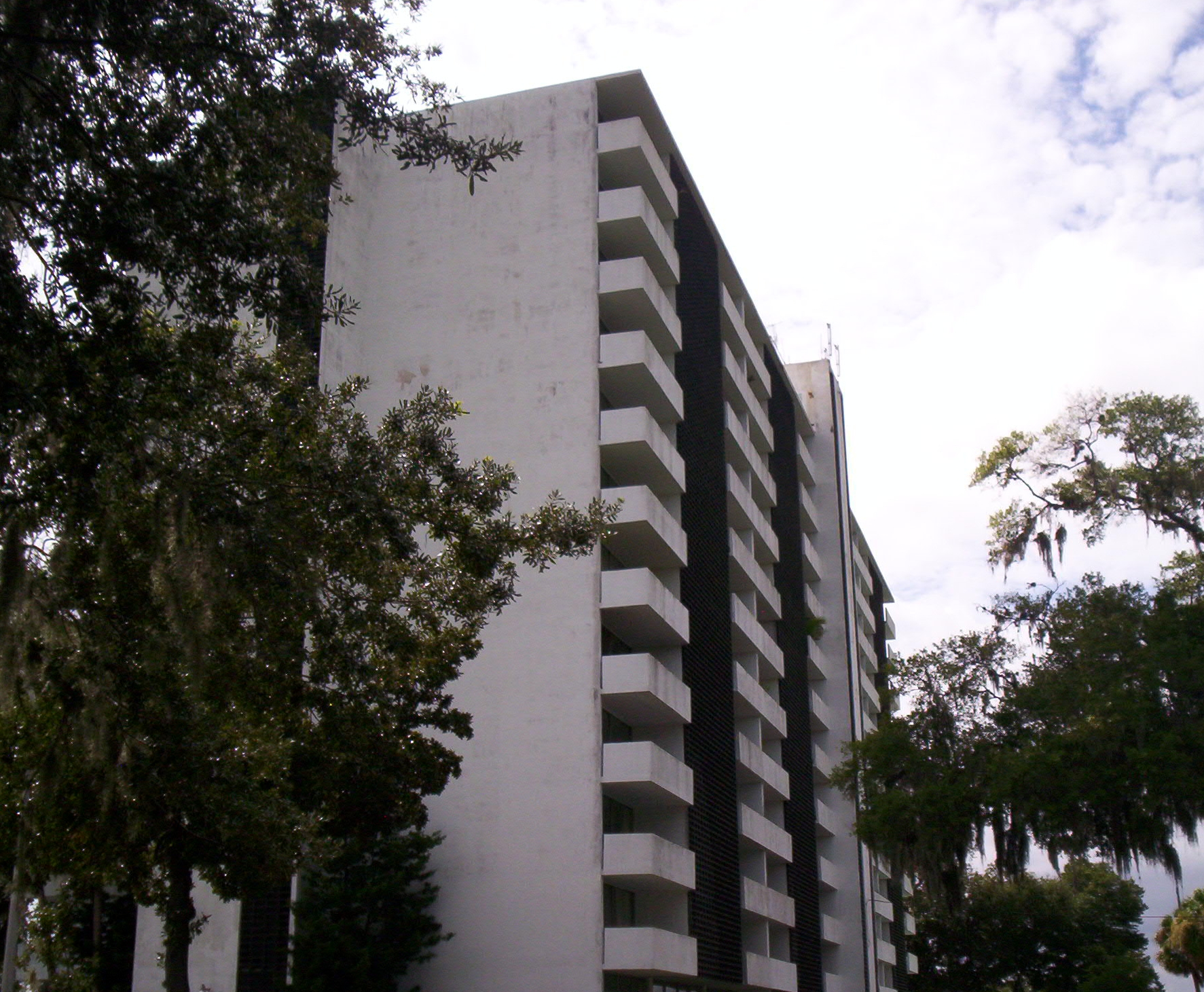
Main campus

The college's main campus was located in the Arlington neighborhood of Jacksonville at the foot of the Mathews Bridge. The school also offered distance learning, and had a student to faculty ratio of 12:1 in on-campus classrooms.

== History ==
Jones College, originally Jones Business College, held its first classes in a private home. It later became the first business college to have a student dormitory.

The school had national accreditation from the Accrediting Council for Independent Colleges and Schools (ACICS). It was certified to operate in Florida by the Commission for Independent Education (CIE) and approved by CIE to grant degrees at both the associate's level and the bachelor's level of academic study. By the end of its operation, Jones College offered degrees in business and information technology, as well as medical, legal and educational fields.

Jones College students were to transfer to Keiser University to complete their coursework.

== Radio ==
Jones College previously operated 2 Radio stations, WKTZ-FM (90.9 MHz) and WJAX (1220 AM). WKTZ-FM aired a beautiful music format, branded as "Jones College Radio", while WJAX aired syndicated programming from America's Best Music.

Both stations were sold to Educational Media Foundation in November 2014, and their formats were replaced with Religious programming.

After the sale, Jones College Radio continued to stream online until September 6, 2022.
