= WKTZ (AM) =

- Jacksonville, Florida; United States
- Frequency: 1220 kHz

Programming
- Format: Conservative Christian radio
- Affiliations: American Family Radio

Ownership
- Owner: American Family Association

History
- First air date: February 1958 (as WPEG)
- Former call signs: WPEG (1957–1960); WQTY (1960–1963); WDCJ (1963–1971); WKTZ (1971–1984); WRXJ (1984–1986); WKTZ (1986–1987); WJAX (1987–2014)

Technical information
- Licensing authority: FCC
- Facility ID: 31937
- Class: D
- Power: 1,000 watts day; 36 watts night
- Transmitter coordinates: 30°19′26.0″N 81°34′06.8″W
- Translator: See § Translator
- Repeater: 90.9 WJKV-HD4 (Jacksonville)

Links
- Public license information: Public file; LMS
- Website: www.afr.net

WKTZ (1220 kHz) is an American radio station licensed to serve Jacksonville, Florida, United States. Established in 1958, the station is owned and operated by the American Family Association, and is that organization's only station on the AM band.

The station was assigned the call sign "WJAX" by the Federal Communications Commission (FCC) on May 26, 1987 and then assigned the callsign WKTZ on November 5, 2014.

== Programming ==
Until November 2014, WJAX featured the syndicated America's Best Music format of adult standards and adult contemporary oldies music distributed by Westwood One, and streams online. Previously, the station aired Music of Your Life, which Jones Radio Networks distributed until January 19, 2008, and then aired Jones' Jones Standards format until it was discontinued in September 2008 and absorbed into America's Best Music following Triton Media Group's (owners of Westwood One's predecessor Dial Global) purchase of Jones.

== History ==
The station began broadcasting from a transmitter located at the water plant across from Confederate Park (now Springfield Park) near First and Main streets. The station was owned by the city government. WJAX was also an FM station on 95.1 and played album rock throughout the 1970s. The company that purchased WJAX-FM from the city in the early 1980s also owned WAPE on 690 AM, which is now WOKV. When the deal was done, the WAPE call sign took over 95.1 and for a short while simulcast their top 40 format on both AM and FM frequencies. The call sign languished unused for years, but made a comeback on the AM dial as a station owned and operated by Jones College. The original WJAX on 930 AM is now WFXJ. The WJAX call sign has been used by Jacksonville's CBS station WJAX-TV since 2014.

== Translator ==
| Call sign | Frequency | City of license | FID | ERP (W) | Class | FCC info |
|---|---|---|---|---|---|---|
| W270CD | 101.9 FM | Jacksonville Beach, Florida | 140687 | 120 | D | LMS |
