= WPDQ (FM) =

- Scottsville, Kentucky; United States
- Frequency: 91.3 MHz

Programming
- Format: Classic hits

Ownership
- Owner: Southern Wabash Communications of Middle Tennessee, Inc.

History
- Former call signs: WBGB (2008–2018); WPDQ (2018–2020); WNTC (2020–2021); WNTC-FM (June–October 2021)

Technical information
- Licensing authority: FCC
- Facility ID: 172966
- Class: A
- ERP: 1,600 watts
- HAAT: 72 meters (236 ft)
- Transmitter coordinates: 36°34′36.1″N 86°29′49.9″W

Links
- Public license information: Public file; LMS

WPDQ (91.3 FM) is a radio station licensed to serve the community of Scottsville, Kentucky. The station is owned by Southern Wabash Communications of Middle Tennessee, Inc. It airs a classic hits format.

== History ==
The station was assigned the call sign WBGB by the Federal Communications Commission on March 20, 2008, and received its license to cover on May 14, 2012. The station changed its call sign to WPDQ on March 23, 2018, to WNTC on June 25, 2020, and to WNTC-FM on July 22, 2021. It then became WPDQ again on October 7, 2021.
