= WOKV (AM) =

Sports radio station in Jacksonville, Florida, United States

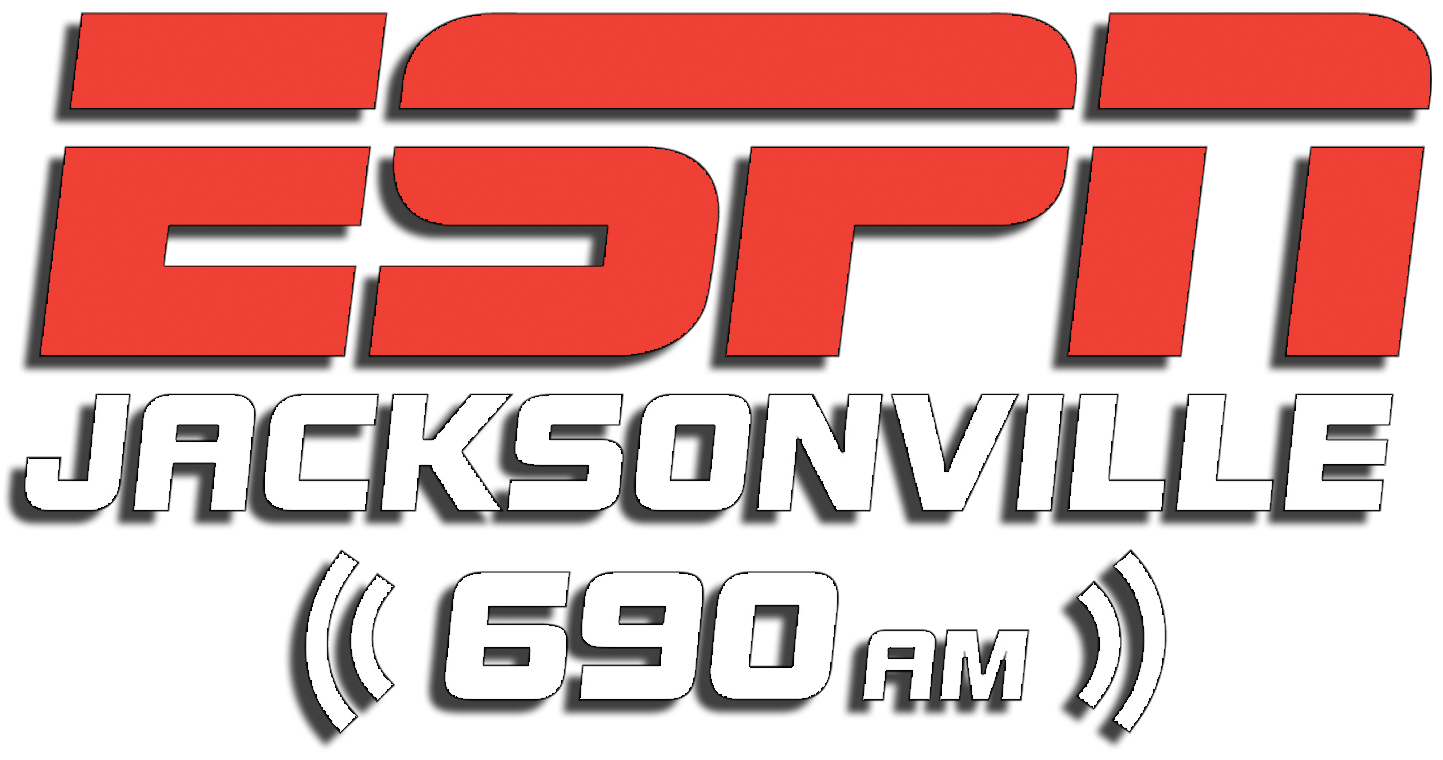
- Jacksonville, Florida; United States
- Broadcast area: Jacksonville metro area
- Frequency: 690 KHz
- Branding: ESPN 690

Programming
- Language: English
- Format: Sports
- Affiliations: ESPN Radio; Jacksonville Jumbo Shrimp

Ownership
- Owner: Cox Media Group; (Cox Radio, LLC)
- Sister stations: WAPE-FM; WEZI; WHJX; WJGL; WOKV-FM

History
- First air date: October 23, 1958; 67 years ago
- Former call signs: WAPE (1958–89); WJKF (1989); WPDQ (1989–94)
- Call sign meaning: "OK"

Technical information
- Licensing authority: FCC
- Facility ID: 53601
- Class: B
- Power: 50,000 watts day 25,000 watts night
- Transmitter coordinates: 30°07′56.9″N 81°41′59.3″W (day); 30°18′28.9″N 81°56′22.4″W (night)

Links
- Public license information: Public file; LMS
- Webcast: Listen live Listen live (via Audacy)
- Website: www.espn690.com

WOKV (690 kHz) is a commercial AM radio station licensed to Jacksonville, Florida, United States. WOKV is owned by Cox Media Group and broadcasts a sports format from studios in Jacksonville's Southside district and transmitters in Orange Park and Baldwin. WOKV-AM and sister station WOKV-FM both serve as the Primary Entry Point for the Emergency Alert System for the entire First Coast region and Greater Jacksonville metropolitan area.

AM 690 is a Canadian and Mexican clear-channel frequency, on which CKGM in Montreal, Quebec, and XEN-AM in Mexico City, Mexico, share Class A status.

== History ==
=== The Big Ape ===
AM 690 first signed on the air on October 23, 1958, as WAPE. It was a daytimer, owned by Brennan Broadcasting. WAPE originally broadcast with 25,000 watts and was required to be off the air at night. In 1963, the station got a boost to 50,000 watts by day and it also got nighttime authorization, running 10,000 watts after sunset; a previous attempt to add 25,000 watts of night power in 1960 was dismissed as contravening the North American Regional Broadcasting Agreement.

Ticket stubs for The Beatles tour stop at the Gator Bowl Stadium on September 11, 1964, which was presented by and hosted by WAPE's personnel.

For more than two decades, WAPE operated as a popular Top 40 station, known as "The Big Ape". Comic actor Jay Thomas started his professional career as the station's morning man. The Brennan family sold the station in 1970 to Stan and Sis Atlass Kaplan for $1.48 million.

Eastman Radio acquired WAPE in 1980. The next year, despite a rating increase, WAPE flipped to country. Several years later, it converted to a Christian radio format. In 1986, WAPE migrated to 95.1 MHz (which, at the time, aired a rhythmic contemporary as WJAX-FM) and relaunched its Top 40 format as WAPE-FM.

=== News/talk ===
In 1989, WAPE was bought by Genesis Communications, which changed the call sign to WJKF, and then to WPDQ, and switched the format to news/talk. The station carried a mix of local hosts and nationally syndicated shows, and was an affiliate of the ABC Information Network.

In 1993, Prism Radio Partners bought WPDQ for $400,000. The following year, Prism bought talk station WOKV (600 AM) and oldies station WKQL (96.9 FM) for $3.75 million. The company moved the talk programming and call letters of WOKV from 600 to 690.

Cox Radio acquired WOKV and several other Jacksonville-area stations in 2000. In 2006, Cox upgraded WOKV's nighttime signal to 25,000 watts after sunset, with a broader pattern, and also added an FM simulcast on 106.5 FM, formerly WBGB (now WHJX). This made WOKV one of only a few large-market news/talk radio stations at the time to simulcast on both AM and FM. In 2013, the FM simulcast was upgraded when WOKV moved the simulcast to the former WFYV-FM at 104.5, broadcasting with 100,000 watts; the 106.5 frequency returned to a music format, first as soft AC WEZI, then as alternative rock WXXJ, and now as urban adult contemporary WHJX.

WOKV was the flagship for the NFL's Jacksonville Jaguars from the team's inception in 1995 through 2013. WJXL took over that role in 2014.

In 2010, WOKV was added as a Primary Entry Point to the Emergency Alert System as part of a doubling of the number of designated PEP stations.

=== Flip to sports ===
On January 2, 2019, WOKV (AM) split from its simulcast with WOKV-FM and changed its format to sports, branded as "ESPN 690" with programming from ESPN Radio.

=== AM 690 facilities ===
WOKV has one of the strongest daytime AM signals in the Southeast. In addition to the Jacksonville metropolitan area, its non-directional 50,000–watt daytime signal covers the Atlantic coast, as far south as Melbourne, Florida, and as far north as Cape Hatteras, North Carolina, an area that includes Savannah, Georgia, and Charleston, South Carolina. At night, the station reduces power to 25,000 watts and uses a directional antenna to protect clear channel Class A station CKGM in Montreal as well as older, high-power stations on the 690 frequency, including XEWW in Baja California, Mexico, and CBU in Vancouver, British Columbia, Canada.

== Programming ==
WOKV AM 690's programming is made up primarily of ESPN Radio shows, with some live play-by-play coverage of sporting events.
