= American Red Cross Volunteer Life Saving Corps Station =

Historic Red Cross station in Florida, US

- U.S. National Register of Historic Places

- Location within Florida Location within the United States
- Location: Jacksonville Beach, Florida
- Coordinates: 30°17′22″N 81°23′23″W
- NRHP reference No.: 14000187
- Added to NRHP: May 5, 2014

American Red Cross Volunteer Life Saving Corps Station is a national historic site located at 2 Ocean Front North, Jacksonville Beach, in Duval County. As of 2014, the building is a part of to the National Register of Historic Places. The historic lifeguard station was donated to the city of Jacksonville Beach, the American Red Cross logos were removed, and the city continues to use it for lifeguards.

== Background ==
In Jacksonville, the American Red Cross Volunteer Life Saving Corps (ARCVLSC) is a non-profit organization made up of volunteer lifeguards. It is a division of the American Red Cross, which provides volunteer lifeguards to Jacksonville beaches and internationally through Lifeguards Without Borders.

In the summer of 1912, Lyman G. Haskell, a medical doctor in Jacksonville who also worked as the Physical Director of the YMCA, and Clarence H. MacDonald, Playground Director for the City of Jacksonville, conceptualized and founded a corps affiliated with the United States Volunteer Life Saving Corps at what was then called Pablo Beach, Florida. These men became the first Medical Officer and Captain, respectively. In 1914, the seventeen charter members of the Corps became part of the American Red Cross's national water safety program as the American Red Cross Volunteer Life Saving Corps, Coast Guard Division #1.

The building, constructed in 1947, is an example in the Art Moderne Style of local architect Jefferson Davis Powell.

It was added to the National Register of Historic Places on May 5, 2014.

== Volunteer Corps Station Now ==
The ARCVLSC volunteer ranks include more than 120 active members and hundreds of alumni of the Corps. In its 106 years of service, members of the Corps have recorded 1,430 lifesaving rescues, 1,753 assists to swimmers in distress, and more than 25,000 first aid cases ranging from jellyfish stings to broken limbs.

This service to the community has been accomplished through almost 1,300,000 hours of volunteer service by the 4,000 members and alumni of the Volunteer Life Saving Corps.

However, 102 years after its founding (in 2014), the Jacksonville Beach volunteer corps is the last of its kind in the country. The Life Saving Corps Station is listed in the National Register of Historic Places Program.
