= Freebird Live =

Music venue in Jacksonville Beach, Florida, US

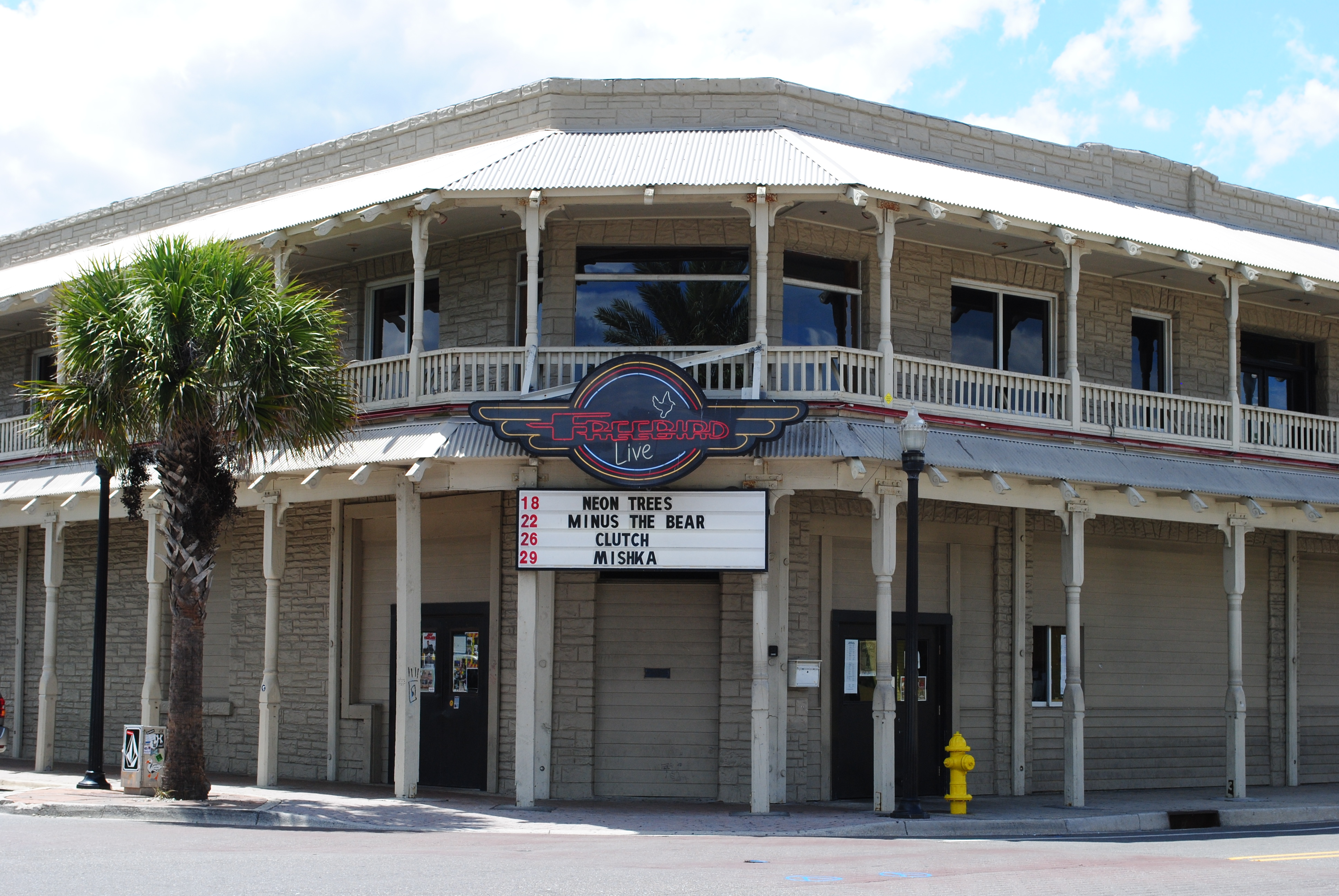
- Interactive map of Freebird Live
- Former names: Freebird Cafe (1999-2005)
- Address: 200 1st St N Jacksonville Beach, FL 32250
- Location: Downtown Jacksonville Beach
- Coordinates: 30°17′26″N 81°23′24.5″W
- Owner: Judy Van Zant-Jenness; Melody Van Zant
- Seating type: Standing-room only
- Capacity: 700

Construction
- Opened: September 8, 1999
- Renovated: 2008
- Closed: January 21, 2016

Website
- Venue Website

Freebird Live (originally Freebird Cafe) was a music venue located in Jacksonville Beach, Florida. They closed their doors with a final concert on January 21, 2016.

== Overview ==
The venue opened on September 8, 1999, with a concert by The Charlie Daniels Band. The cafe featured Lynyrd Skynyrd memorabilia, food and recorded music.

In 2005, the owners considered moving the venue location to accommodate a larger capacity and attract bigger acts. Buildings in Atlantic Beach, Florida, and Jacksonville, Florida, were considered. However, the owners decided to renovate its current location in lieu of moving.

Jacksonville bands that played at Freebird Live include the Gregg Allman Band (d.2017) in 2002, Dickey Betts & Great Southern in 2002, Yellowcard in 2002, Shinedown in 2003, Red Jumpsuit Apparatus in 2004, and Cold in 2010. Florida bands that played at Freebird Live include most of the famous Florida bands in the 00s including: Gainesville's Sister Hazel in 2008, Less Than Jake in 2005, and Against Me! in 2007; Orlando's Trivium in 2009, Tremonti (guitarist for Creed) in 2015, and Blood on the Dance Floor in 2012; Underoath in 2005, The Almost in 2007, Mayday Parade in 2011, Anberlin in 2012, Copeland in 2006, We the Kings in 2011, Nonpoint in 2010, New Found Glory in 2010, and Iron & Wine in 2005.

The venue closed its doors permanently following a performance from Galactic on January 20, 2016. The building is now occupied by Surfer the Bar.

== Performances at Freebird Live ==
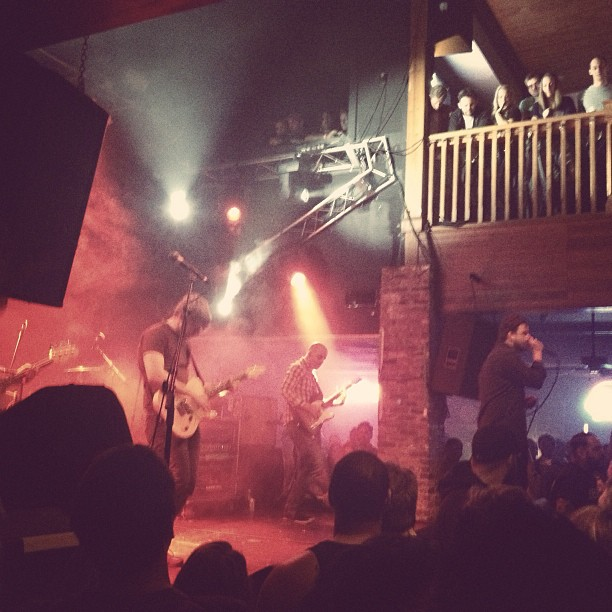
Circa Survive

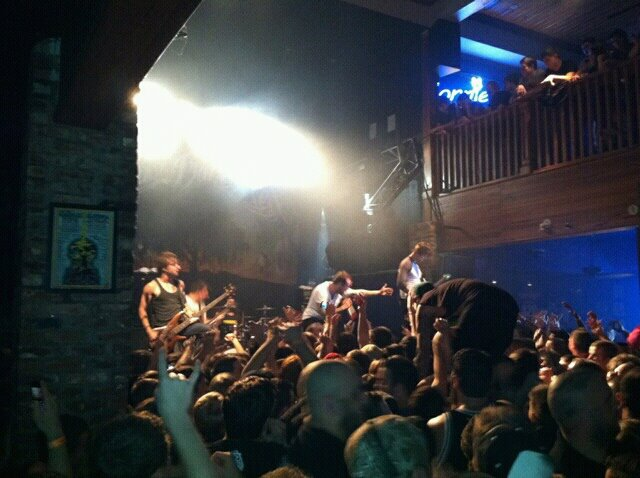
August Burns Red

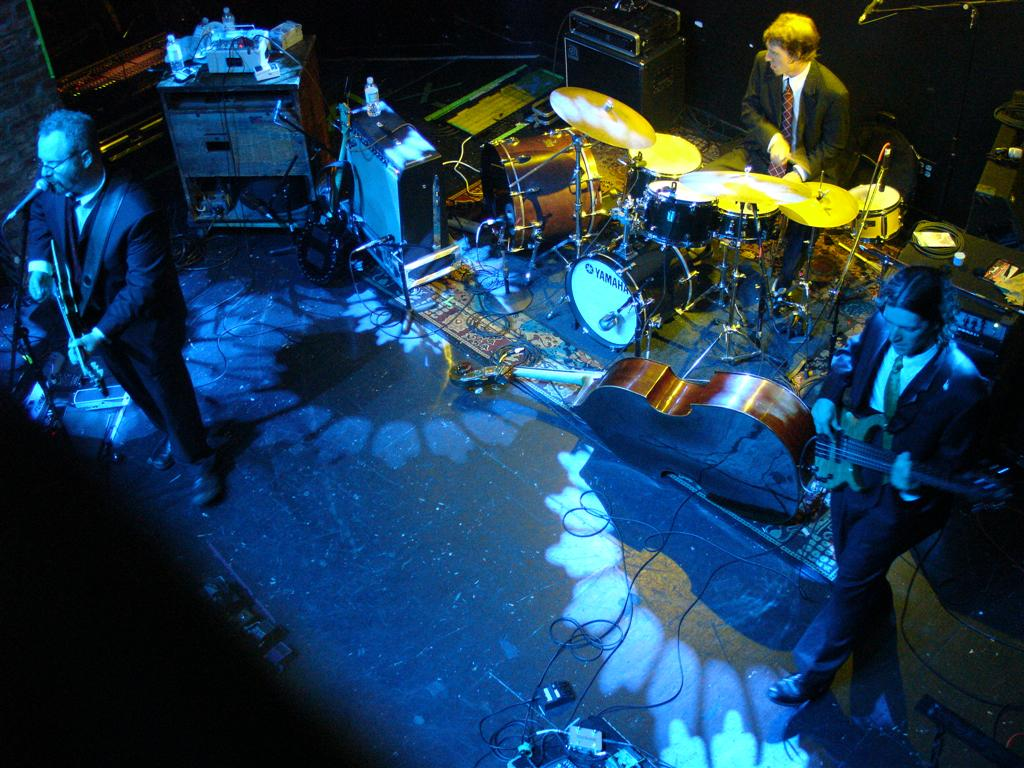
The Codetalkers from Savannah

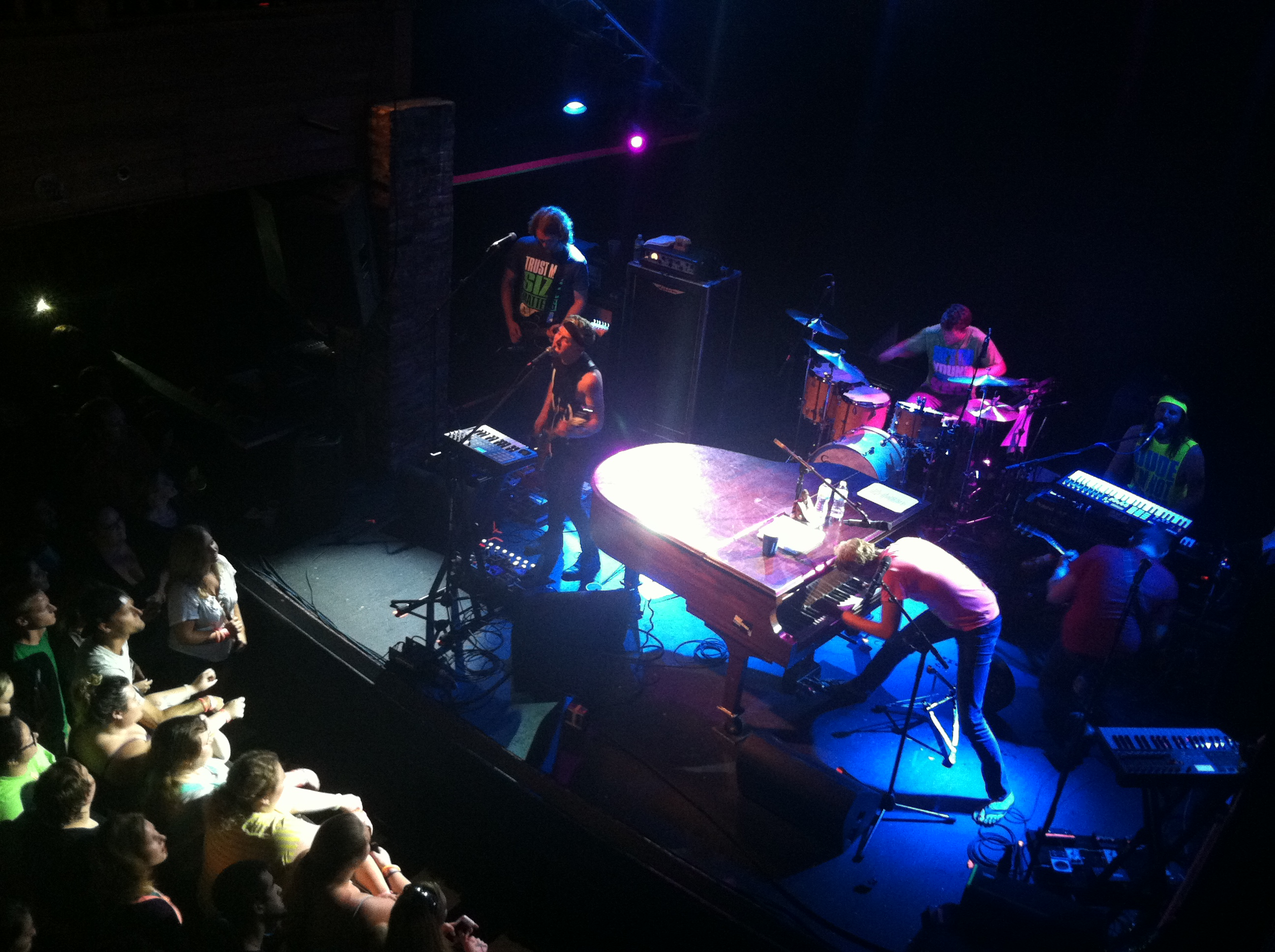
Andrew McMahon

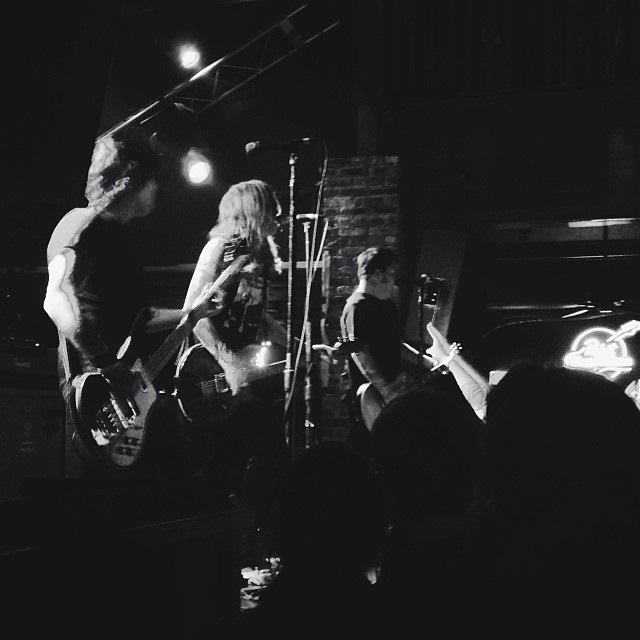
Against Me! from Gainesville in 2007

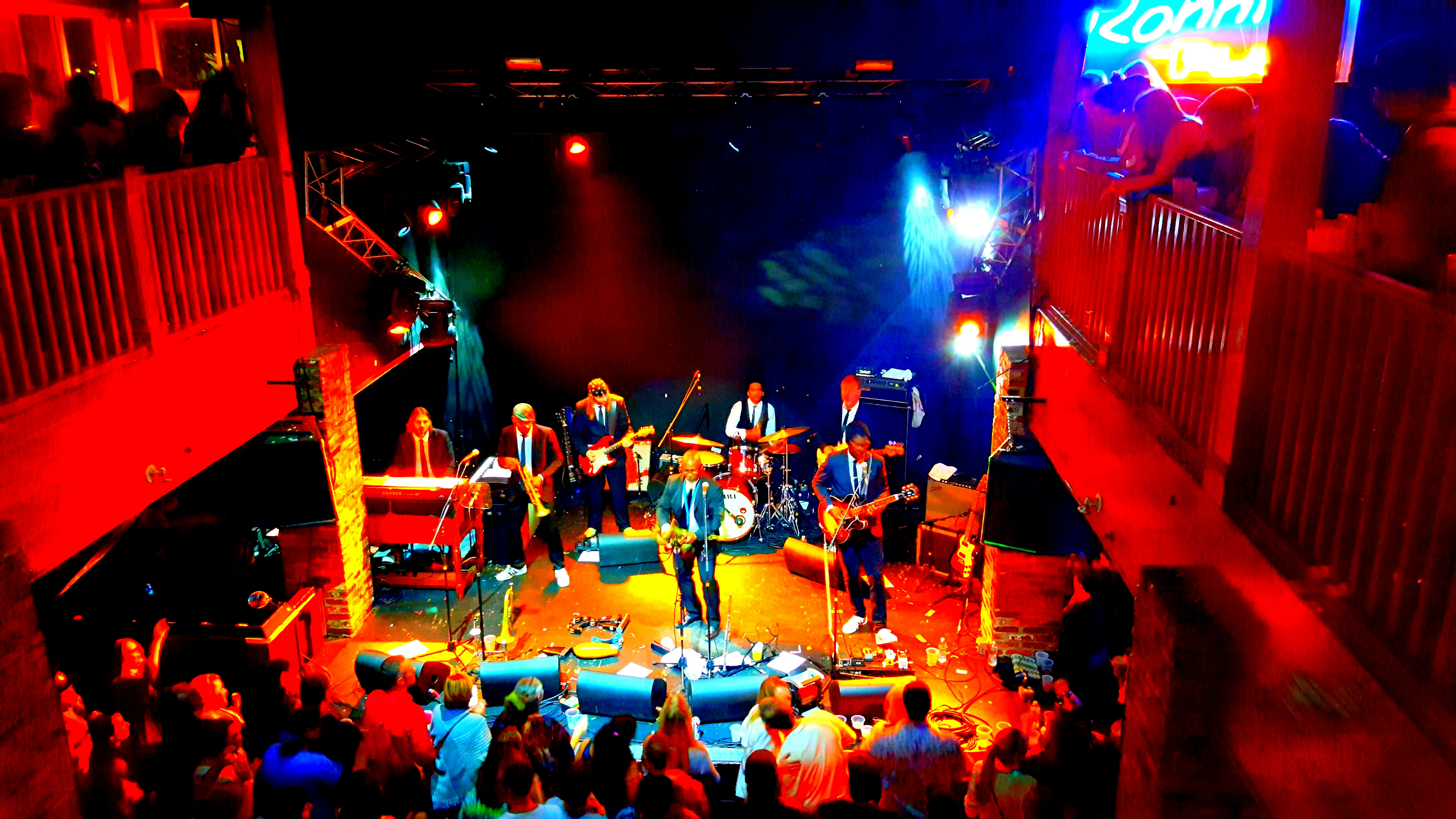
Karl Denson's Tiny Universe

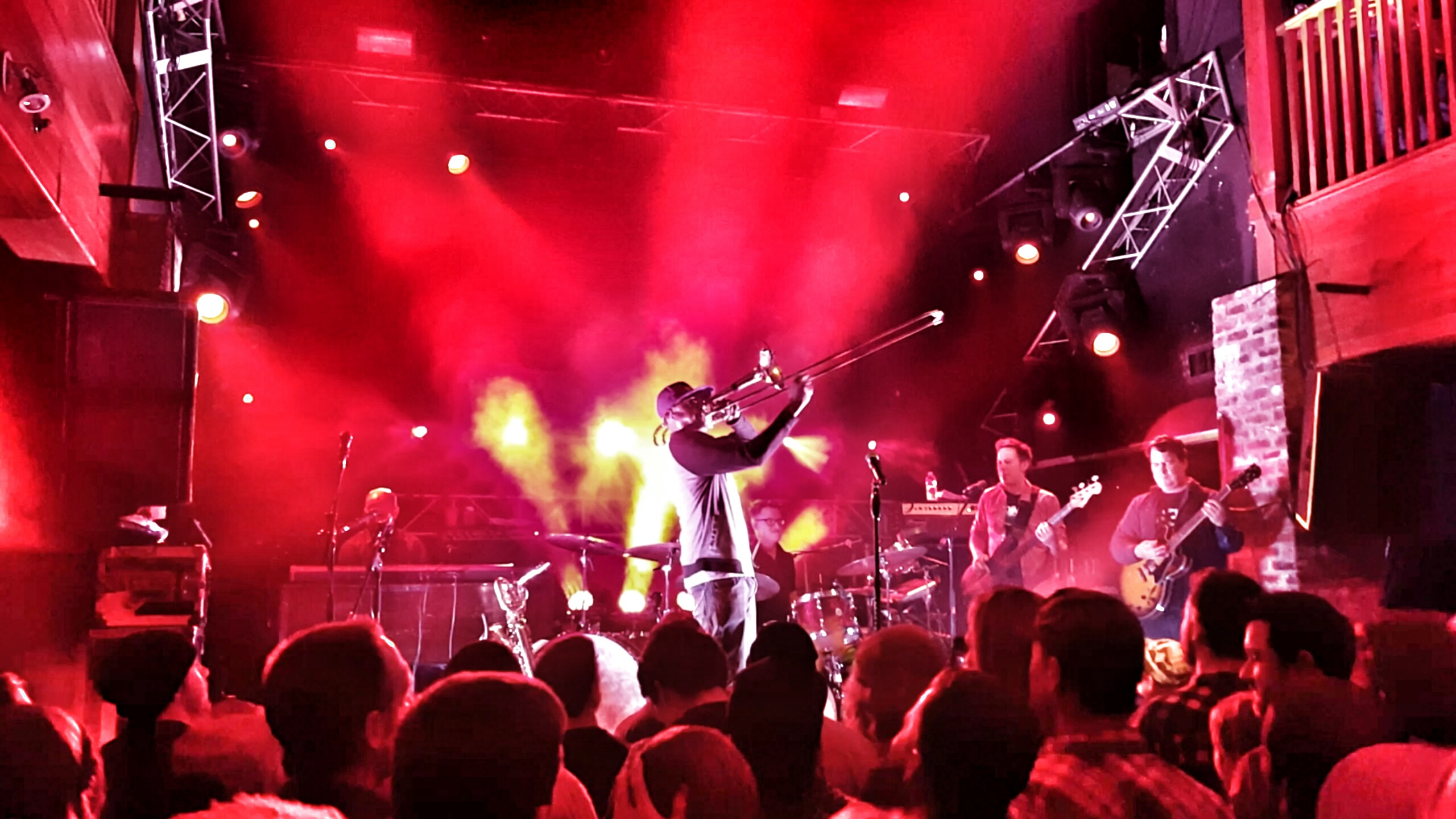
Galactic, the last show at Freebird Live
