= American Red Cross Volunteer Life Saving Corps =

Body of American red cross

Volunteer Life Saving Corps
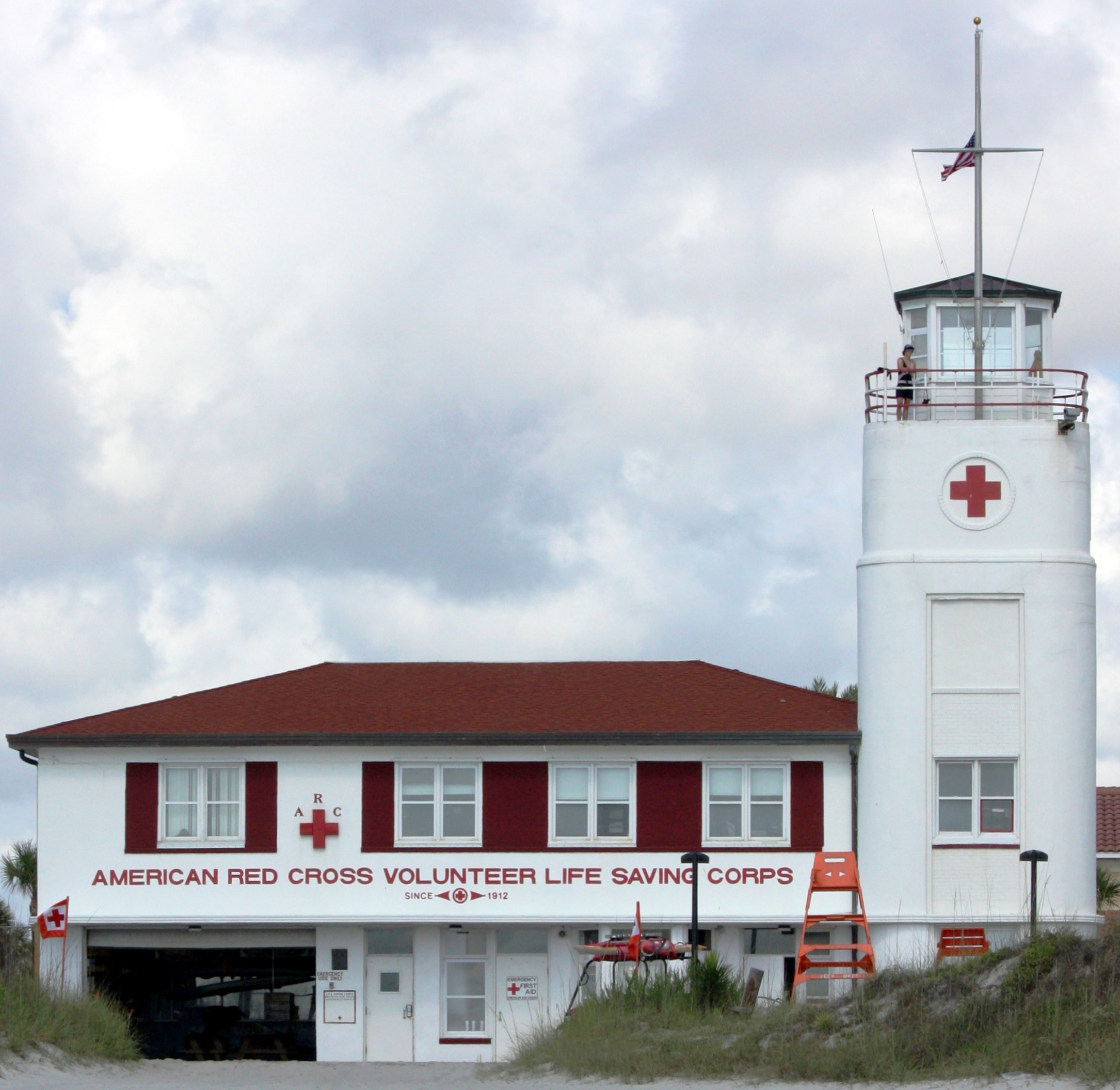
- American Red Cross Volunteer Life Saving Corps Station located at Jacksonville Beach.
- Industry: Lifeguarding
- Founded: 1912

The American Red Cross Volunteer Life Saving Corps, known as the Life-Saving Service of the American Red Cross, is the lifeguard body of the American Red Cross that began in 1912 as a response to the growing number of drowning deaths in the United States.

== History ==
Recognizing an epidemic of water-related deaths, Wilbert Longfellow, in 1912, presented a plan to the American Red Cross for improved water safety. The Red Cross adopted the nationwide plan in January 1914 and established the Red Cross Life Saving Corps. The corps is the forerunner of the present-day Red Cross water safety program. Longfellow organized the lifesaving program.

The Jacksonville Beach Volunteer Corps is the last of its kind in the country. The American Red Cross Volunteer Life Saving Corps Station is listed in the National Register of Historic Places Program.

== See also ==
- American Red Cross Volunteer Life Saving Corps Station
- https://jaxbeachlifeguard.org/
