= Casa Marina Hotel =

Hotel in Jacksonville Beach, Florida, US

- U.S. National Register of Historic Places
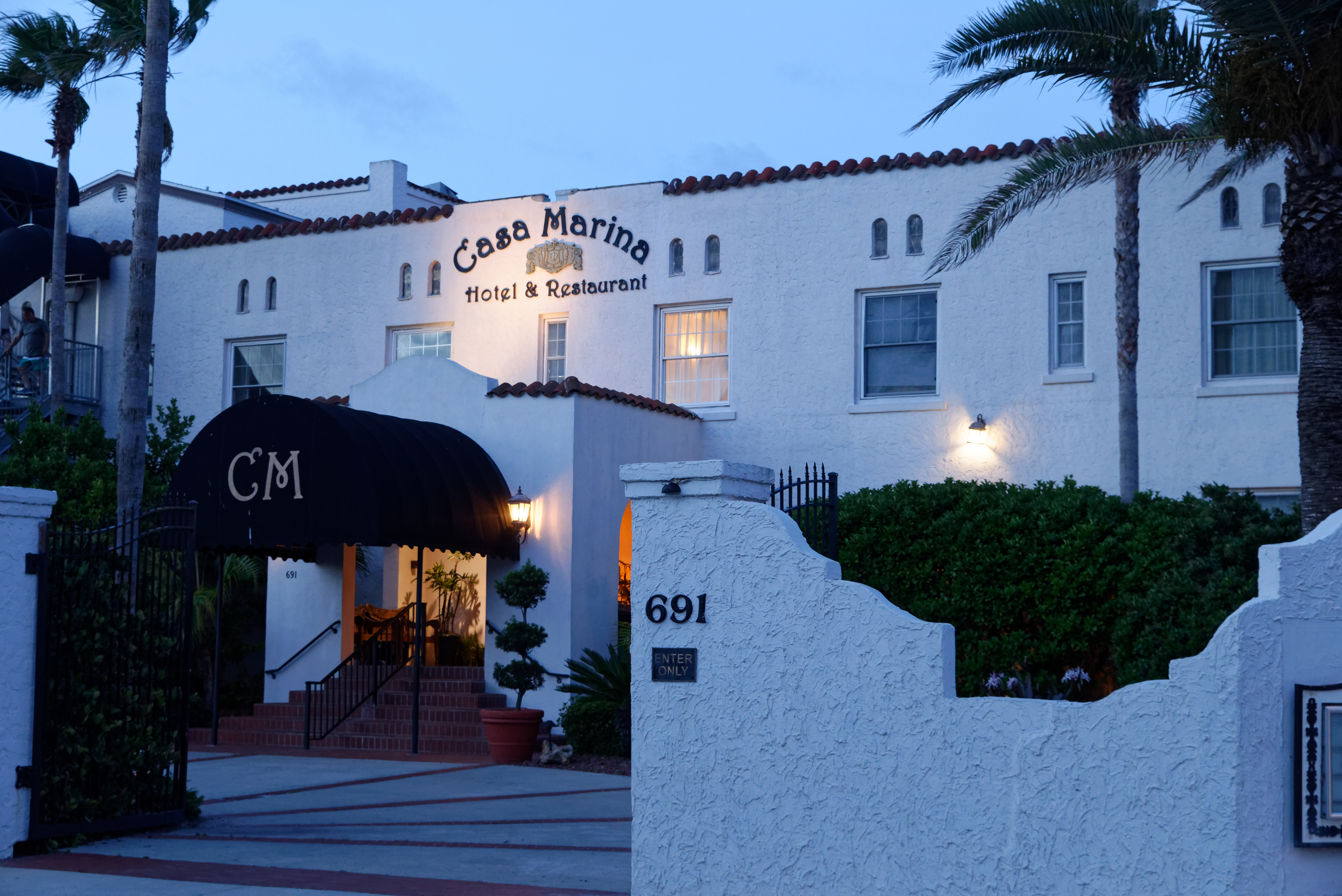

- Location within Florida Location within the United States
- Location: Jacksonville Beach, Florida
- Coordinates: 30.29476°N 81.39047°W
- Area: less than one acre
- Architectural style: Mission/Spanish Revival
- NRHP reference No.: 93000893
- Added to NRHP: 2 September 1993

The Casa Marina Hotel is a historic hotel in Jacksonville Beach, Florida. It is located at 12 Sixth Avenue, North. It was built in 1925. On September 2, 1993, it was added to the U.S. National Register of Historic Places. The National Trust for Historic Preservation has accepted the Casa Marina Hotel to be part of the Historic Hotels of America.
