= Wilbert E. Longfellow =

Water safety pioneer (1881–1947)

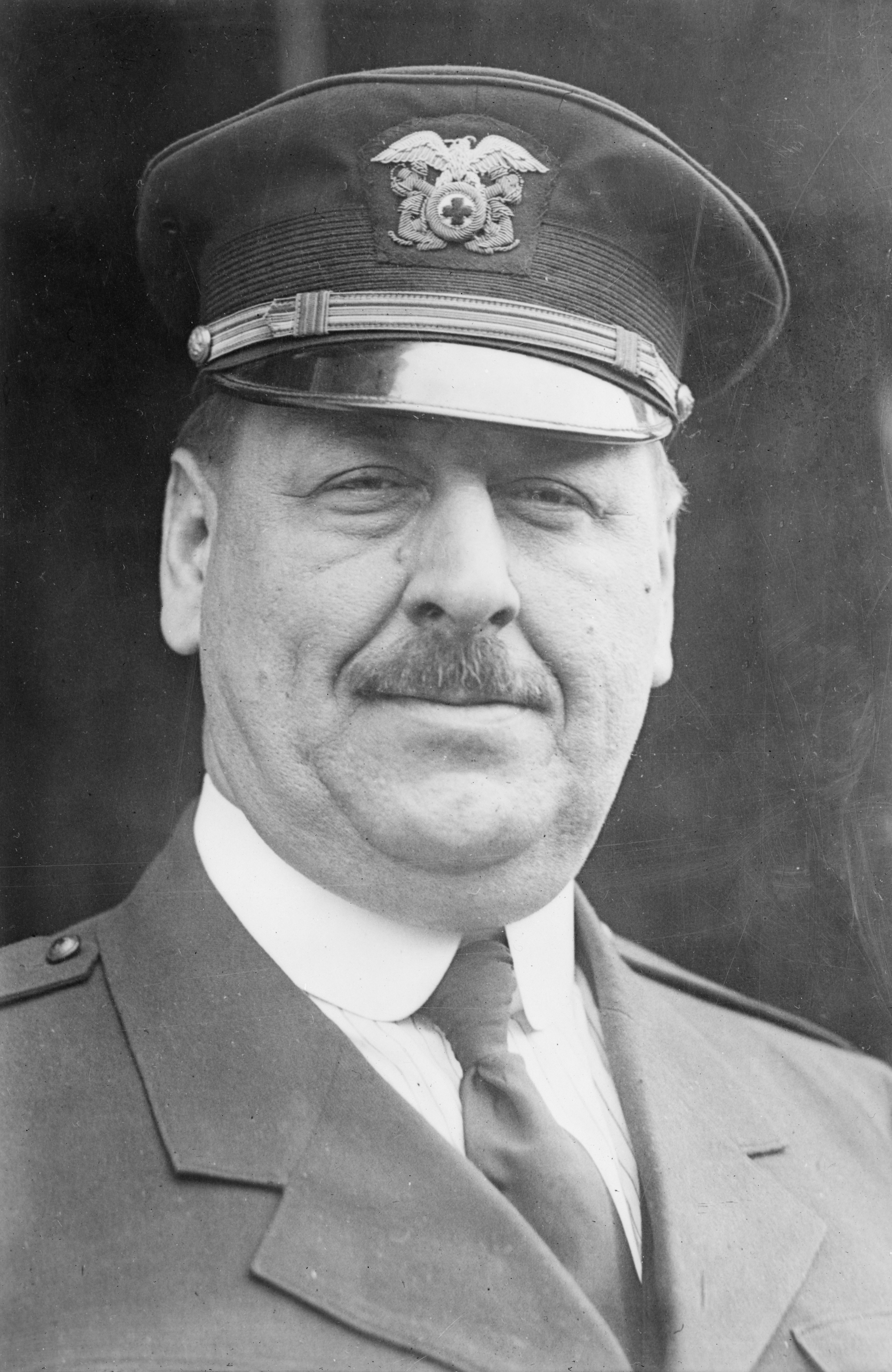
- Longfellow as Field Director of the Red Cross Lifesaving Corps
- Born: Wilbert E. Longfellow; May 7, 1881; Pawtuxet, Rhode Island, U.S.
- Died: March 18, 1947 (aged 65); Pawtuxet, Rhode Island, U.S.

Wilbert E. Longfellow (Note: His middle name is variously given as Edmond and Edmund.) (May 7, 1881 – March 18, 1947) was an American water safety instructor. Credited with halving the drowning rate in the United States, his mission was "the water-proofing of America."

Beginning around 1900, Longfellow worked his entire adult life promoting swimming education and water safety.

== Background ==
Working in his first job as a newspaper reporter in Providence, Rhode Island, Longfellow wrote many stories on local drownings. In his spare time, he began a one-man crusade to educate people on water safety with the U.S. Volunteer Life Saving Corps. This work led the US VLSC to appoint Longfellow as the organization's state superintendent in 1905 and bestow upon him the title of Commodore. In 1910, he became the organization's Commodore-in-Chief.

Longfellow lobbied the Rhode Island General Assembly to fund life saving equipment for Rhode Island beaches and for more swimming education. His success led him in 1914 to work with the American Red Cross. Upon his recommendation, the Red Cross took up water safety as one of its missions. In 1914, the organization hired Longfellow to organize the Volunteer Life Saving Corps. In 1917, Longfellow and the Red Cross began teaching swimming skills to U.S. soldiers and sailors preparing to fight in World War I.

With the Volunteer Life Saving Corps, Longfellow recruited and trained volunteers to perform rescues and teach water safety. His mission was to "Waterproof America", and his slogan became "Everyone a swimmer, every swimmer a Lifesaver". This later became the motto of early Red Cross swimming safety programs.

Longfellow worked for the Red Cross from 1914 to 1947, retiring shortly before his death. He is credited with halving the drowning rate in the United States, from 10.4 per 100,000 to 5.2.

== Awards and honors ==
- Silver Buffalo Award, Boy Scouts of America
- International Swimming Hall of Fame
