= Lifeguards Without Borders =

Non-profit organization

- Type: Non-profit
- Industry: Water Safety Awareness
- Founded: 2006
- Founders: Justin Sempsrott, Andrew Schimdt
- Headquarters: Jacksonville Beach, Florida
- Website: lifeguardswithoutborders.org

Lifeguards Without Borders is an international non-profit organization of volunteer lifeguards and health care professionals who promote training, program development, and research.

== History ==
Lifeguards Without Borders was founded by doctors Justin Sempsrott and Andrew Schmidt in 2006 in Jacksonville Beach, Florida. Sempsrott, the organization's executive director, had been a lifeguard since the mid-1990s. Schmidt is a doctor of osteopathic medicine and has a master's degree in public health. He is also an assistant professor at the University of Florida.

The organization began as part of the international division of the American Red Cross Volunteer Lifesaving Corps with the goal of sending volunteer lifeguards to regions with high drowning risk that lack access to lifeguards or information about drowning.

Lifeguards Without Borders projects have included lifeguard instructor training programs in Peru; teaching EMS, nursing and physician courses; performing medical research on drowning; donating whistles, buoys, and rescue boards; and providing additional lifeguards for large-scale events, such as Carnaval in Ecuador.

Lifeguards Without Borders partners with other international lifesaving and drowning prevention organizations to provide logistical, educational, and resource support. The organization also teaches other lifesaving techniques including in-water resuscitation, cardio-pulmonary resuscitation, spinal immobilization and wilderness medicine.

== Partnerships ==
- International Surf Lifesaving Association
- National Drowning Prevention Alliance (NDPA)

== Major projects ==
The primary focus of Lifeguards Without Borders is doing service projects worldwide, all of which are planned and coordinated together with the International Surf Lifesaving Association.

=== Jamaica 2005 ===
In 2005, a group of lifeguards visited Jamaica in 2005 to develop a water safety course for the national search and rescue Team. However, their objective changed when the group realized that many of the Jamaican participants did not know how to swim. Lifeguards Without Borders was then created to teach people how to save themselves and others.

=== Dominican Republic 2006 ===
In 2006, Lifeguards Without Borders team visited Juan Dolio beach in the Dominican Republic to train local lifeguards on rescuer safety, focusing on techniques such as the "Reach-Throw" lay-response.

=== Jacksonville 2008 ===
In 2008, the organization focused on teaching swimming to underprivileged children in Jacksonville, Florida. The team saw that many of the children lived near the beach but could not swim. The project included lessons, free cook outs, and donations from Sunrise Surf Shop, Surfman Monica Ruggerio, and the Wavemasters Society.

=== Peru 2008 ===
In 2008, Lifeguards Without Borders developed a course to train Peruvian lifeguards to become instructors. The course included lifeguards from the Peruvian National Lifeguards and Association of Volunteer Lifeguards.

=== Bangladesh 2009 ===
Sempsrott traveled to Bangladesh to join the Centre for Injury Prevention and Research to help campaign in drowning prevention. He also met with local lifeguards to help decrease the number of drownings.

=== Ecuador 2011 ===
Along with Paul Dunning, Lifeguards Without Borders helped prevent drowns in Ecuador during the Carnival holiday in the Santa Elena area. During the time there, they performed 1878 interventions and 55 rescues.

=== Vietnam 2011 ===
Members of the Lifeguard Without Borders attended the World Conference on Drowning Prevention in DaNang, Vietnam. Sempsrott and Schmidt presented a research "Systematic Review of Non-Ustein Style Drowning Terms", and members demonstrated proper CPR techniques.

=== Germany 2013 ===
The next Lifeguards with Borders Project was for Germany

== Drowning research and publications ==
The drowning research conducted by Lifeguards Without Borders also concluded that drowning is the tenth leading cause of death for people of all ages in the United States and is the cause of 1% of deaths worldwide.
