= Jacksonville Beach, Florida =

- City
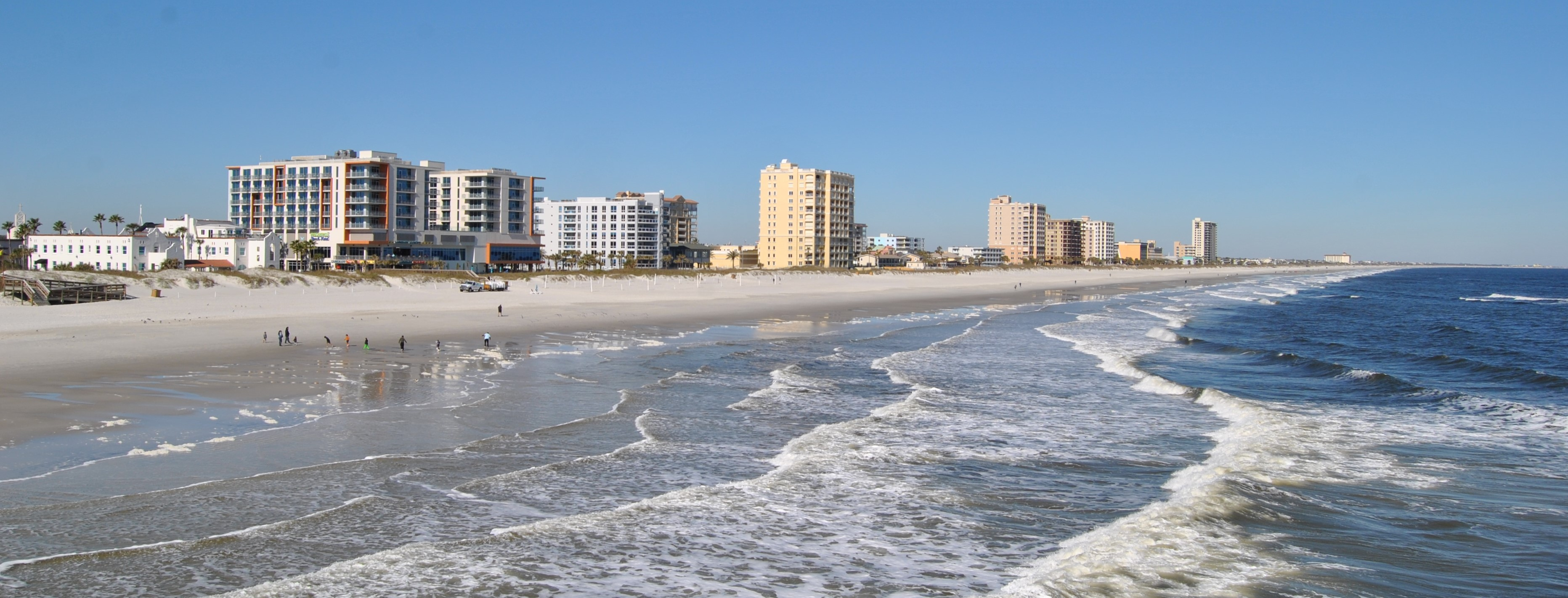
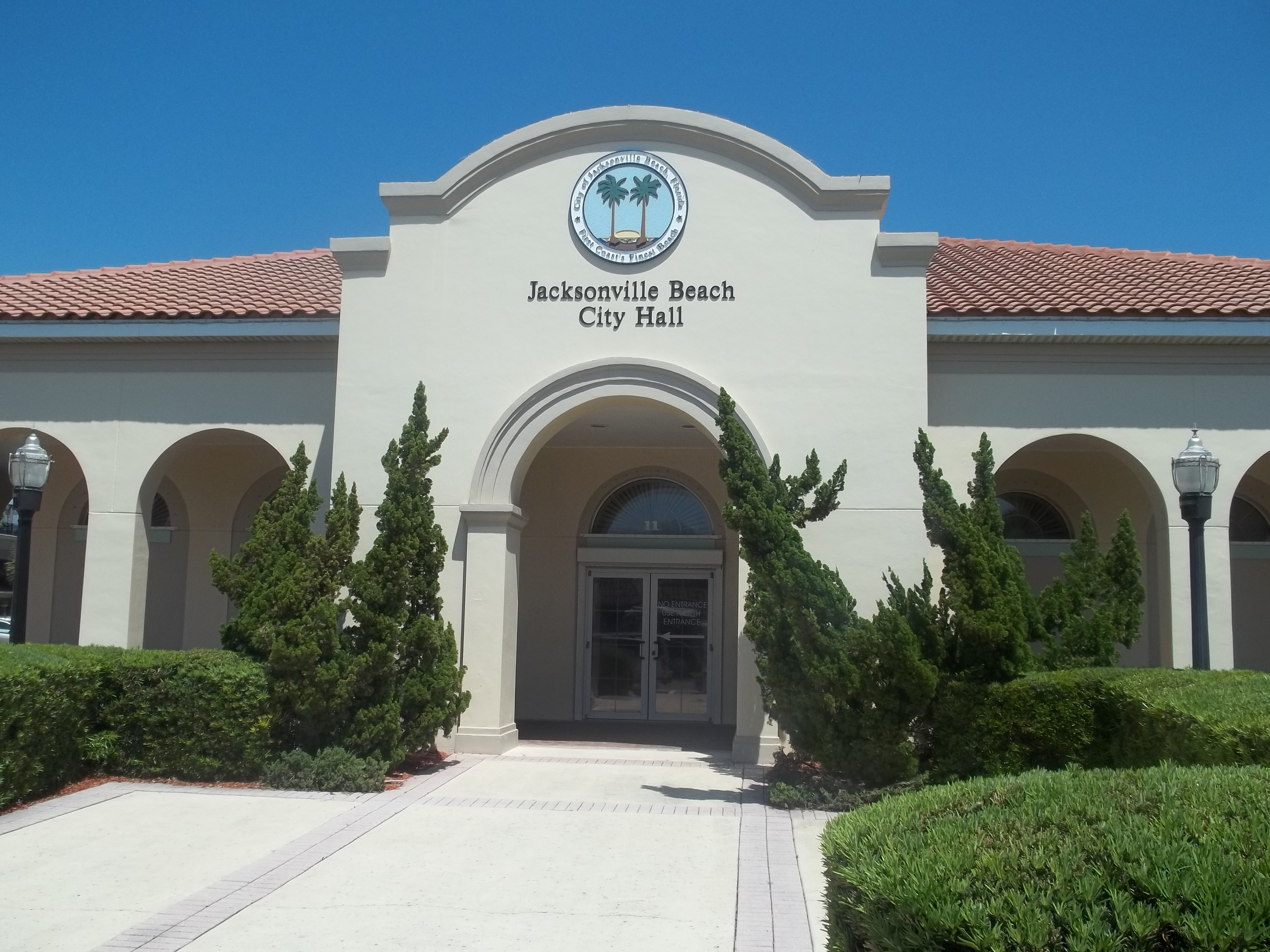
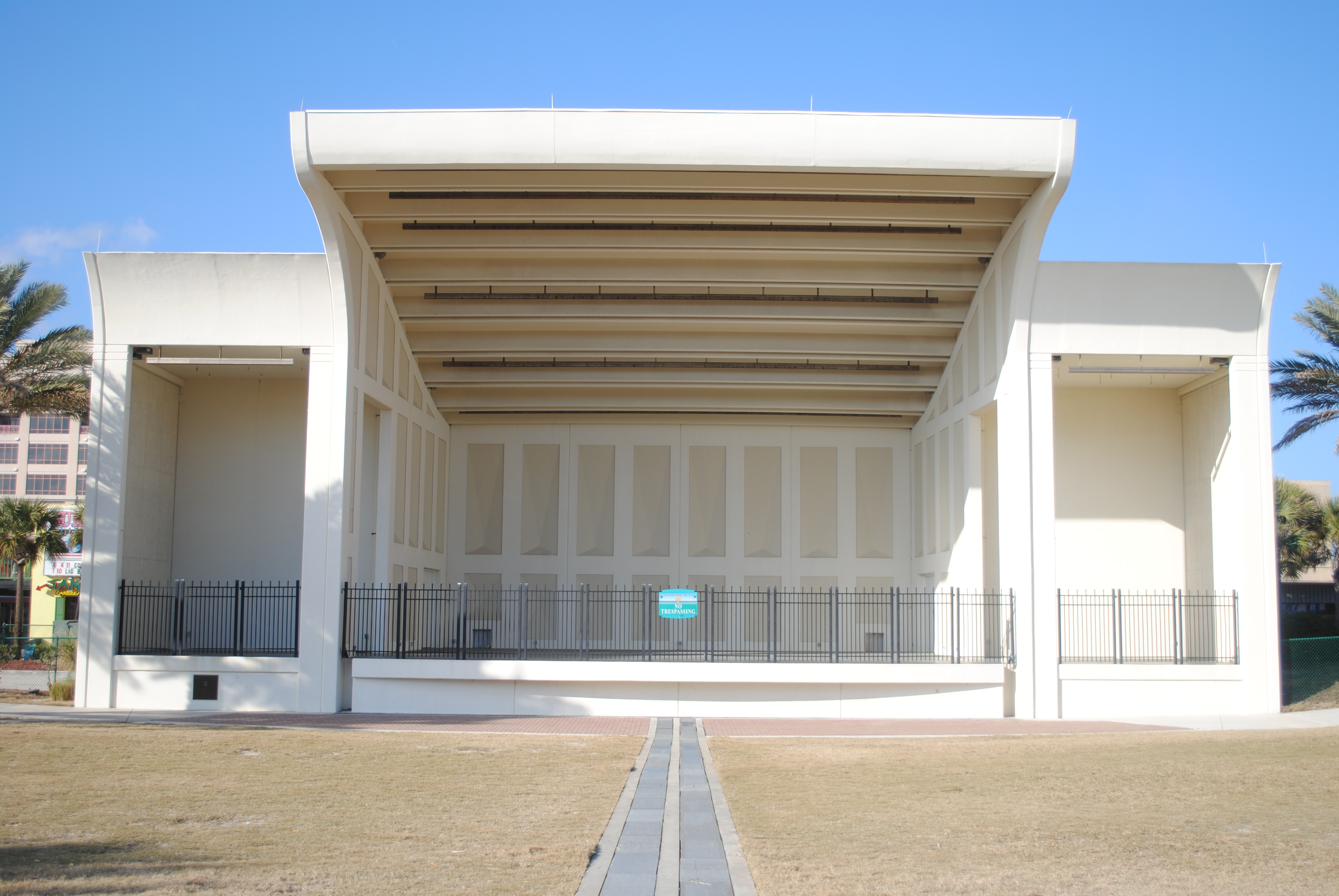
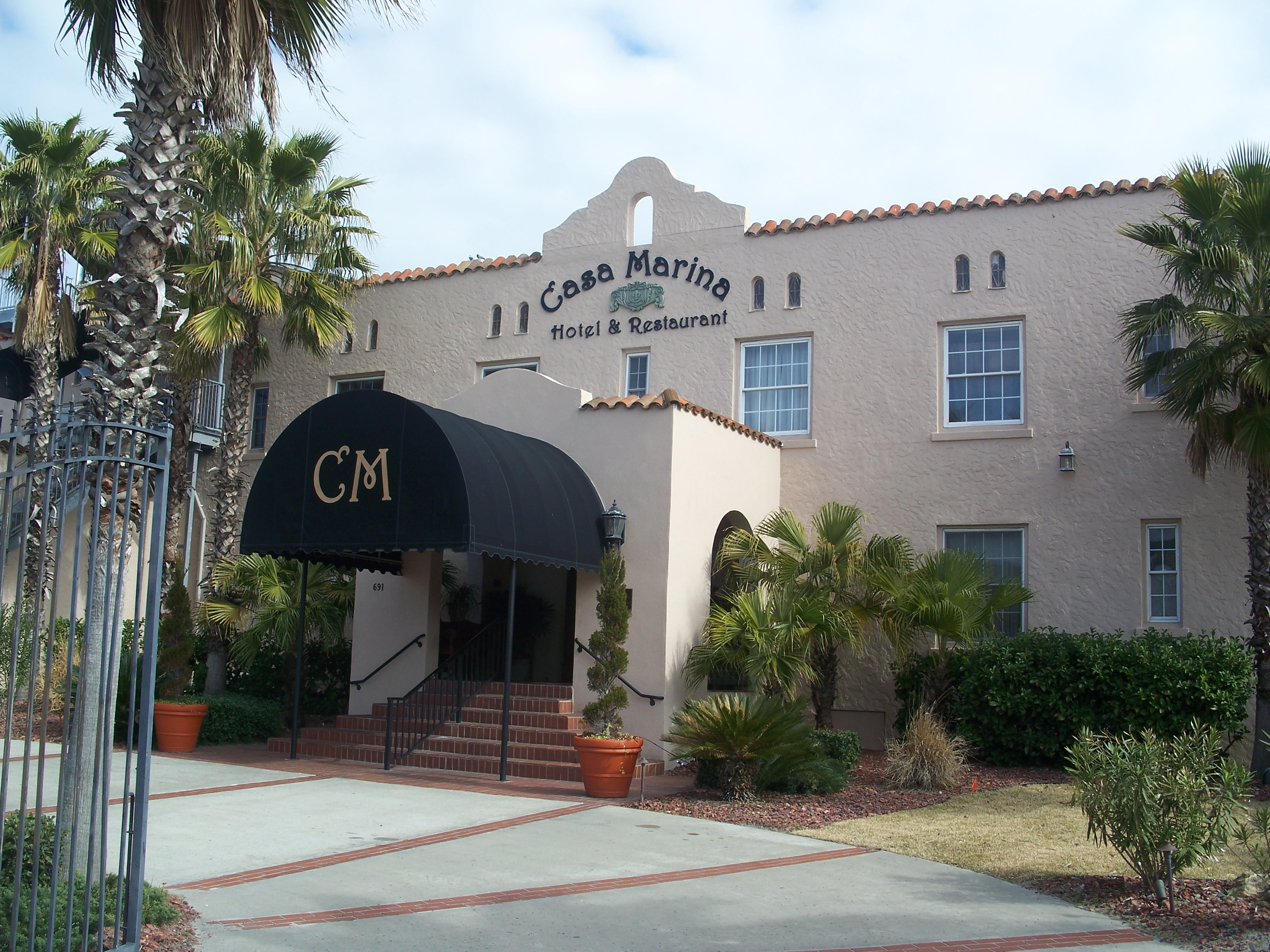
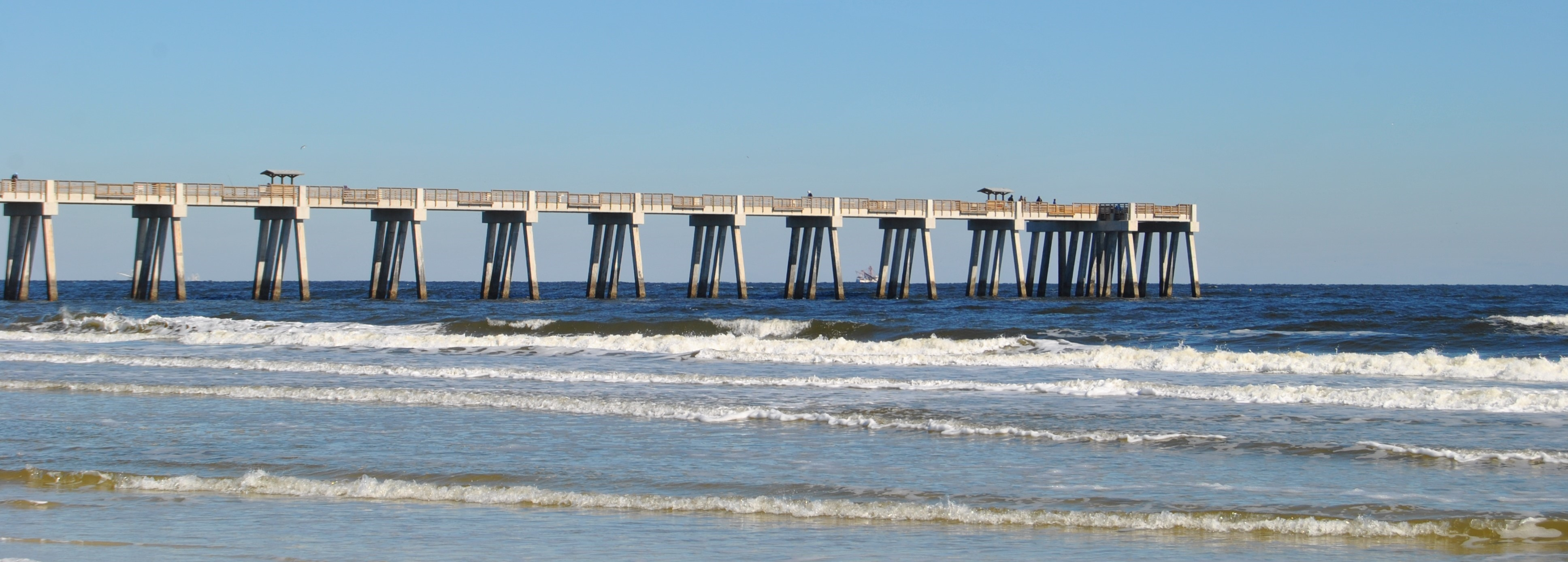
- Aerial view (2026) Jacksonville Beach view looking north Jacksonville Beach City Hall Seawalk Pavilion Casa Marina Hotel American Red Cross Volunteer Life Saving Corps Station Jacksonville Beach Pier

- Logo

- Location of Jacksonville Beach, Florida
- Coordinates: 30°16′46″N 81°23′15″W
- Country: United States
- State: Florida
- County: Duval
- Settled: 1831
- Incorporated as Pablo Beach: May 22, 1907
- Incorporated as Jacksonville Beach: 1925

Government
  - Type: Council–Manager

Area
  - City: 21.964 sq mi (56.886 km^{2})
  - Land: 7.316 sq mi (18.948 km^{2})
  - Water: 14.648 sq mi (37.939 km^{2})
- Elevation: 0 ft (0 m)

Population (2020)
  - City: 23,830
  - Estimate (2023): 23,447
  - Density: 3,203.8/sq mi (1,237.01/km^{2})
  - Urban: 1,247,374
  - Metro: 1,713,240
- Time zone: UTC−5 (Eastern (EST))
  - Summer (DST): UTC−4 (EDT)
- ZIP Codes: 32227, 32240, 32250
- Area codes: 904 and 324
- FIPS code: 12-35050
- GNIS feature ID: 2404785
- Website: jacksonvillebeach.org

Jacksonville Beach is a coastal resort city in Duval County, Florida, United States. The population was 23,830 at the 2020 census. It is part of the Jacksonville, Florida Metropolitan Statistical Area.

The city is part of a group of communities collectively referred to as the Jacksonville Beaches on the northern half of San Pablo Island. These communities include Mayport, Atlantic Beach, Neptune Beach, and Ponte Vedra Beach. When the city of Jacksonville consolidated with Duval County in 1968, Jacksonville Beach, together with Atlantic Beach, Neptune Beach, and Baldwin, voted to retain their own municipal governments. As a result, citizens of Jacksonville Beach are also eligible to vote in mayoral elections for the City of Jacksonville.

== History ==
It was incorporated on May 22, 1907, as Pablo Beach, and changed to Jacksonville Beach in 1925.

The area around present-day Jacksonville Beach was first settled by Spanish settlers. Spanish missions were established from Mayport to St. Augustine. Spain ceded Florida to Great Britain by treaty in 1763, only to have Spain regain it again, and then a final time in 1821 to the United States. American river pilots and fishermen came to Hazard, present-day Mayport, and established a port.

=== Pablo Beach ===
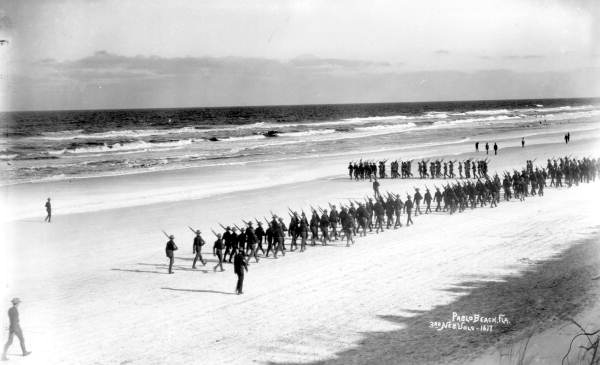
US Army volunteers marching on the beach during the Spanish–American War

In the late 19th century, developers began to see the potential in Duval County's oceanfront as a resort. In 1883 a group of investors formed the Jacksonville and Atlantic Railroad with the intention of developing a resort community that would be connected to Jacksonville by rail.

The first settlers were William Edward Scull, a civil engineer and surveyor, and his wife Eleanor Kennedy Scull. They lived in a tent two blocks east of Pablo Historical Park. A second tent was the general store and post office.

On August 22, 1884, Mrs. Scull was appointed postmaster. Mail was dispatched by horse and buggy up the beach to Mayport, and from there to Jacksonville by steamer.

The Sculls built the first house in 1884 on their tent site. The settlement was named Ruby for their first daughter. On May 13, 1886, the town was renamed Pablo Beach after the San Pablo River.

In 1885, the San Pablo Diego Beach Land Co. sold town lots ranging from $50 to $100 each along with 5 to 10 acres (2.0 to 4.0 ha) lots from $10 to $20 per acre within 3 miles (4.8 km) of the new seaside resort "Pablo Beach".

In September 1892, work on the wagon road to Pablo Beach (Atlantic Boulevard) was begun.

The first resort hotel, called the Murray Hall Hotel, was established in mid-1886, but on August 7, 1890, it was destroyed in a fire.

By 1900, the railway company began to have financial difficulties, and Henry Flagler took over as part of his Florida East Coast Railway.

In late 1900, the railway was changed to standard gauge and was extended to Mayport.

The Spanish–American War broke out in 1898. The 3rd Nebraska arrived July 22, 1898, for training and embarkation. They encamped at Pablo Beach. They were led by three-time presidential candidate, William Jennings Bryan. After flooding in the camp at Pablo Beach the 3rd Nebraska moved to downtown Jacksonville.

=== Jacksonville Beach ===
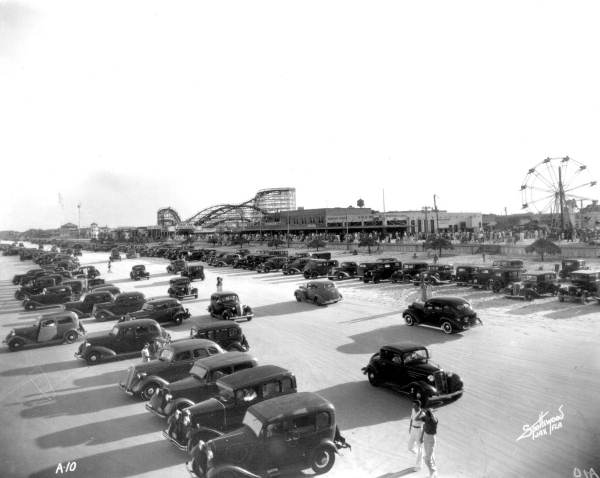
Ocean View Pavilion in 1936

The amusement park phase of Jacksonville Beach began in 1905 with the Pavilion, which was later expanded and called Little Coney Island. It was a popular tourist attraction with a dance floor, swim room, bowling alley, and roller skate rinks. An issue with contracting, and constant weathering of its wooden structure, aged Little Coney Island, causing it to be torn down in 1925.

On June 15, 1925, the name Pablo Beach was changed to Jacksonville Beach.

The Shad's Pier was created in 1922 by Charles Shad, with help by Martin Williams.

Around the same time, W. H. Adams Sr. created the Ocean View Pavilion amusement park on the former site of the Murray Hall Hotel. Adams wanted to create a larger roller coaster than the one at Little Coney Island. His vision resulted in a 93-feet high coaster. The location of the coaster by the beach made it vulnerable to damage, and it was eventually deemed unsafe. It was deconstructed to a smaller coaster, which hurt business at the amusement park.

By 1949, the Ocean View Pavilion was in decline, and a fire destroyed it a few years later. The boardwalk declined in the 1950s due to the crackdown on gambling and games of chance. Driving on the beach was prohibited in 1979. The last amusement park in Jacksonville Beach, Adventure Landing, closed permanently in October 2025.

Pablo Beach made aviation history on February 24, 1921. Lt. William DeVoe Coney, in a transcontinental flight from San Diego, California, landed at Pablo Beach, having made the flight in 22 hours and 17 minutes, beating the old record, set two years earlier, by 3 hours and 32 minutes. Coney's record was soon eclipsed on September 5, 1922, by Jimmy Doolittle piloting a De Havilland DH-4 biplane from Pablo Beach to San Diego in an elapsed time of 21 hours and 19 minutes.

In 1968, most residents of Duval County voted to approve consolidation between the county and the City of Jacksonville. Jacksonville Beach, together with Atlantic Beach, Neptune Beach, and the Westside community of Baldwin, voted to retain their own municipal governments. As such, they are not part of the City of Jacksonville, but receive county-level services from Jacksonville, and vote for Jacksonville's mayor and city council.

Judy Van Zant, widow of lead singer of Lynyrd Skynyrd Ronnie Van Zant, and her daughter Melody opened the Freebird Cafe in 1999. Freebird Live, as it later became known, was a popular music venue that was a staple for Jacksonville Beach for 16 years until its closure in 2016.

In September 1999, Hurricane Floyd destroyed the Jacksonville Beach Pier. Five years later the pier was rebuilt.

In October 2016, Hurricane Matthew forced a mandatory evacuation of Jacksonville Beach. The hurricane came 40 miles off the coast of Jacksonville Beach, causing major flooding. The Jacksonville Beach Pier was partially destroyed.

== Geography ==
According to the United States Census Bureau, the city has a total area of 21.964 square miles (56.89 km^{2}), of which, 7.316 square miles (18.95 km^{2}) is land and 14.648 square miles (37.94 km^{2}) (66.61%) is water.

Jacksonville Beach is the largest town in the Jacksonville Beaches community. It is the eastern terminus of U.S. Route 90, which ends at an intersection with State Road A1A three blocks from the Atlantic Ocean.

=== Cityscape ===
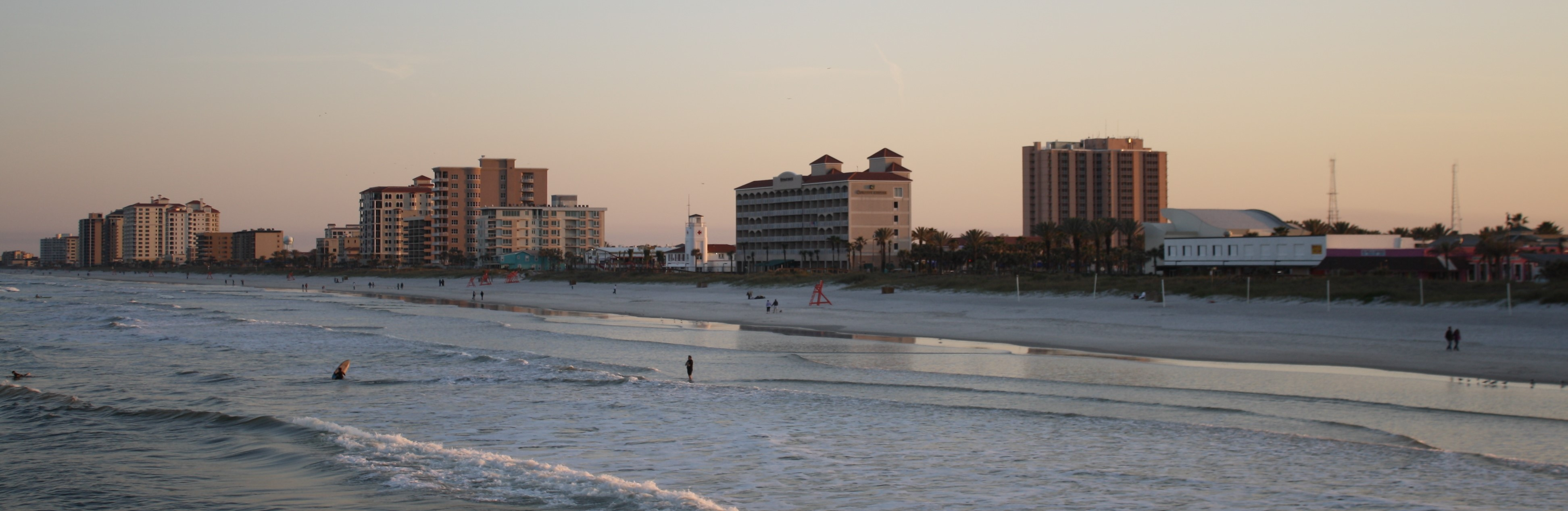
View of Jacksonville Beach from the pier
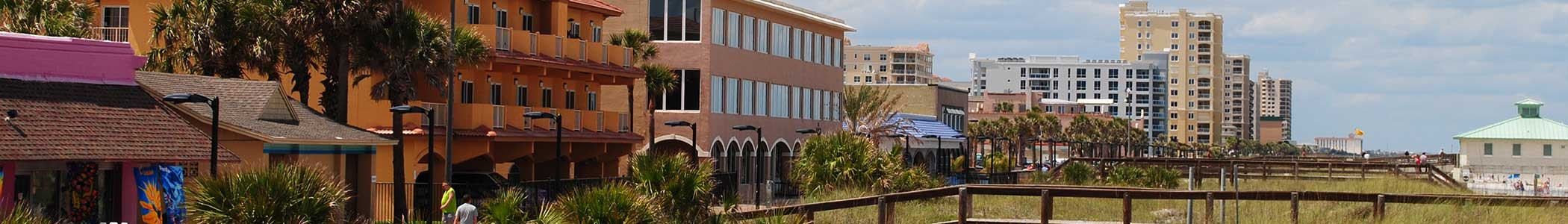
View of Jacksonville Beach Boardwalk

=== Architecture ===
The architecture of Jacksonville varies in style and is not defined by any one characteristic.

Designed by Marsh and Saxelbye, and completed in 1925, Casa Marina Hotel is a Mission-style hotel popular in the 1920s when Jacksonville's beaches were being developed. It was added to the National Register of Historic Places on September 2, 1993.

Constructed in 1947, the American Red Cross Volunteer Life Saving Corps Station is an Art Moderne-style lifeguard station designed by local architect Jefferson Davis Powell. It was added to the National Register of Historic Places on May 5, 2014.

Jacksonville Beach is also home to a notable collection of Mid-Century modern architecture. Perhaps the most notable of these were designed by architect William Morgan.

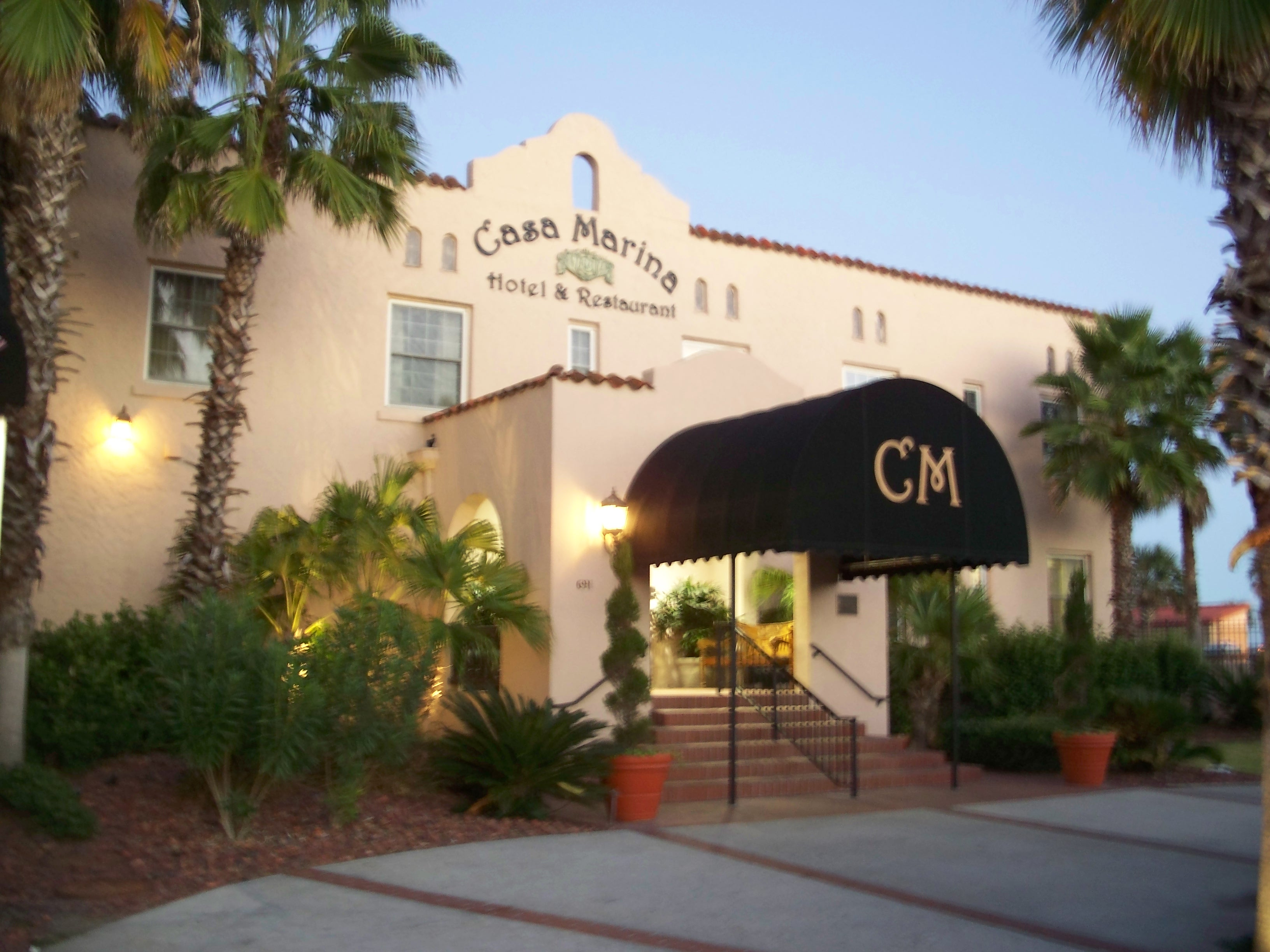
Casa Marina Hotel (1925)

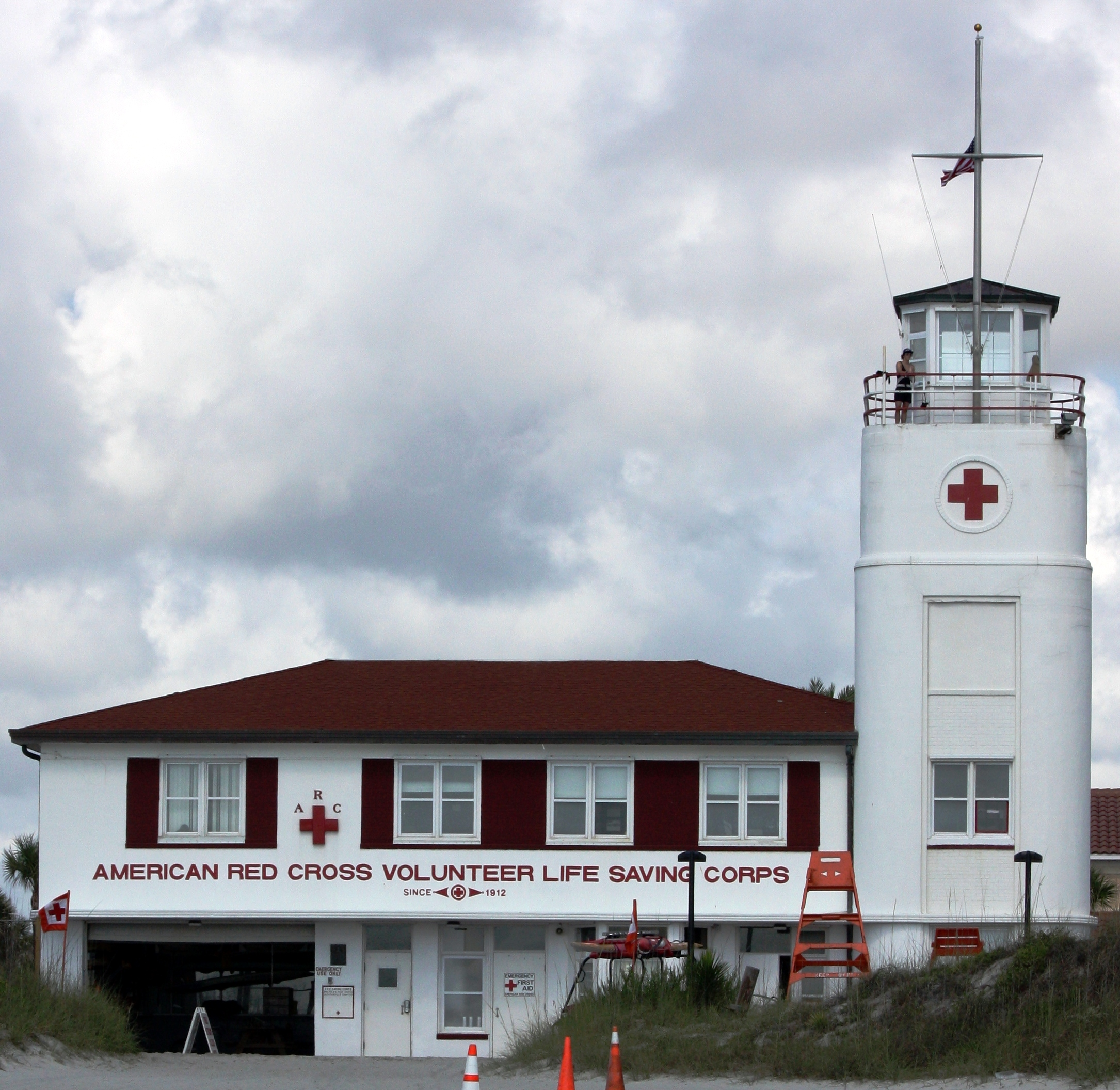
American Red Cross Volunteer Life Saving Corps Station (1947)

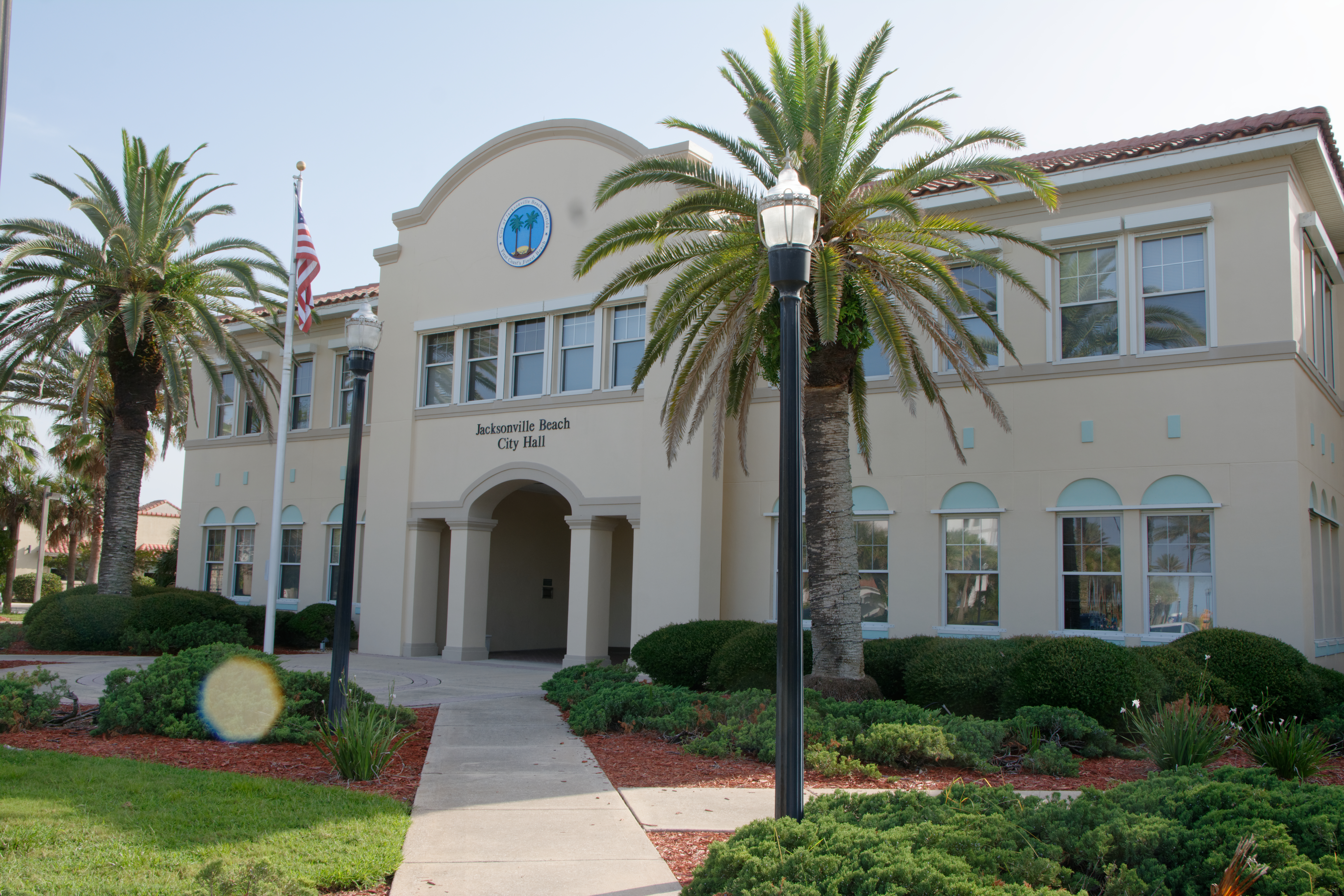
City Hall

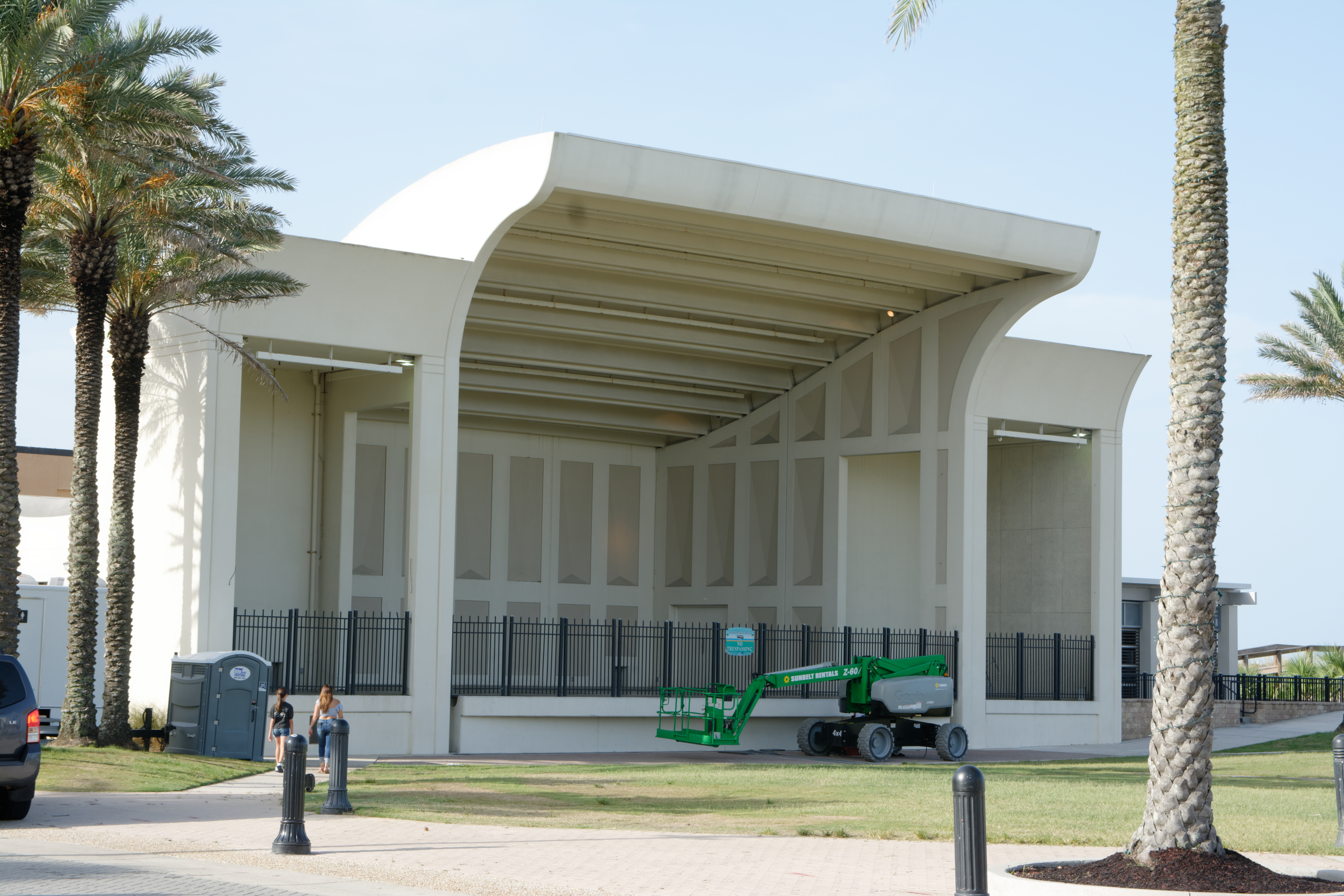
Seawalk Pavilion

=== Climate ===
Jacksonville Beach has a humid subtropical climate (Cfa).

Climate data for Jacksonville Beach, Florida, 1991–2020 normals, extremes 1944–present
Month	Jan	Feb	Mar	Apr	May	Jun	Jul	Aug	Sep	Oct	Nov	Dec	Year
Record high °F (°C)	88 (31)	90 (32)	94 (34)	94 (34)	98 (37)	102 (39)	103 (39)	102 (39)	98 (37)	95 (35)	95 (35)	85 (29)	103 (39)
Mean maximum °F (°C)	78.7 (25.9)	81.0 (27.2)	84.8 (29.3)	87.7 (30.9)	92.0 (33.3)	94.2 (34.6)	95.9 (35.5)	94.9 (34.9)	92.1 (33.4)	87.8 (31.0)	82.9 (28.3)	79.6 (26.4)	97.0 (36.1)
Mean daily maximum °F (°C)	64.8 (18.2)	67.6 (19.8)	72.4 (22.4)	77.3 (25.2)	83.1 (28.4)	87.0 (30.6)	89.3 (31.8)	88.6 (31.4)	85.9 (29.9)	80.4 (26.9)	73.0 (22.8)	67.2 (19.6)	78.0 (25.6)
Daily mean °F (°C)	57.1 (13.9)	59.8 (15.4)	64.6 (18.1)	70.2 (21.2)	76.6 (24.8)	81.0 (27.2)	82.9 (28.3)	82.8 (28.2)	80.8 (27.1)	74.7 (23.7)	66.3 (19.1)	60.1 (15.6)	71.4 (21.9)
Mean daily minimum °F (°C)	49.3 (9.6)	52.0 (11.1)	56.9 (13.8)	63.2 (17.3)	70.1 (21.2)	75.1 (23.9)	76.6 (24.8)	77.0 (25.0)	75.6 (24.2)	69.0 (20.6)	59.7 (15.4)	53.1 (11.7)	64.8 (18.2)
Mean minimum °F (°C)	29.9 (−1.2)	33.9 (1.1)	38.7 (3.7)	47.5 (8.6)	58.4 (14.7)	68.6 (20.3)	71.2 (21.8)	71.4 (21.9)	66.2 (19.0)	51.7 (10.9)	40.8 (4.9)	35.2 (1.8)	27.8 (−2.3)
Record low °F (°C)	14 (−10)	21 (−6)	24 (−4)	37 (3)	46 (8)	55 (13)	63 (17)	63 (17)	53 (12)	36 (2)	25 (−4)	15 (−9)	14 (−10)
Average precipitation inches (mm)	3.50 (89)	2.82 (72)	3.21 (82)	3.01 (76)	2.93 (74)	6.79 (172)	4.90 (124)	7.54 (192)	7.19 (183)	5.10 (130)	2.50 (64)	2.95 (75)	52.44 (1,332)
Average precipitation days (≥ 0.01 in)	10.2	9.2	8.0	7.0	7.6	12.7	12.7	14.3	13.1	9.5	8.3	9.3	121.9
Source: NOAA

=== Parks and recreation ===
Hanna Park is a 1.5-mile (2.4 km) public beach and city park located near Mayport in the Jacksonville Beaches area. It consists of 447 acres (1.81 km^{2}) of mature coastal hammock, and was formerly known as Manhattan Beach, Florida's first beach community for African Americans during the period of segregation in the United States.

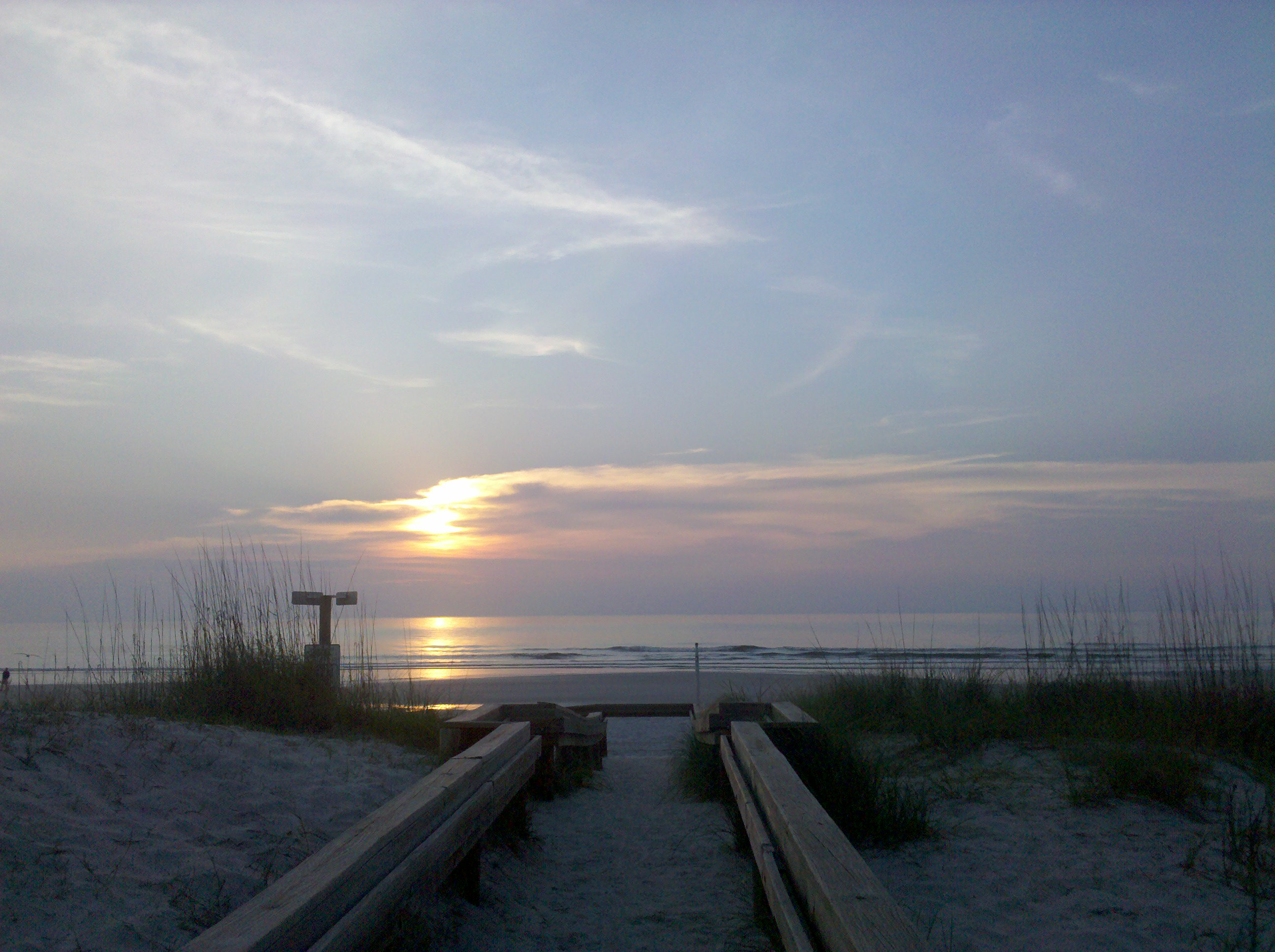
Beach access point

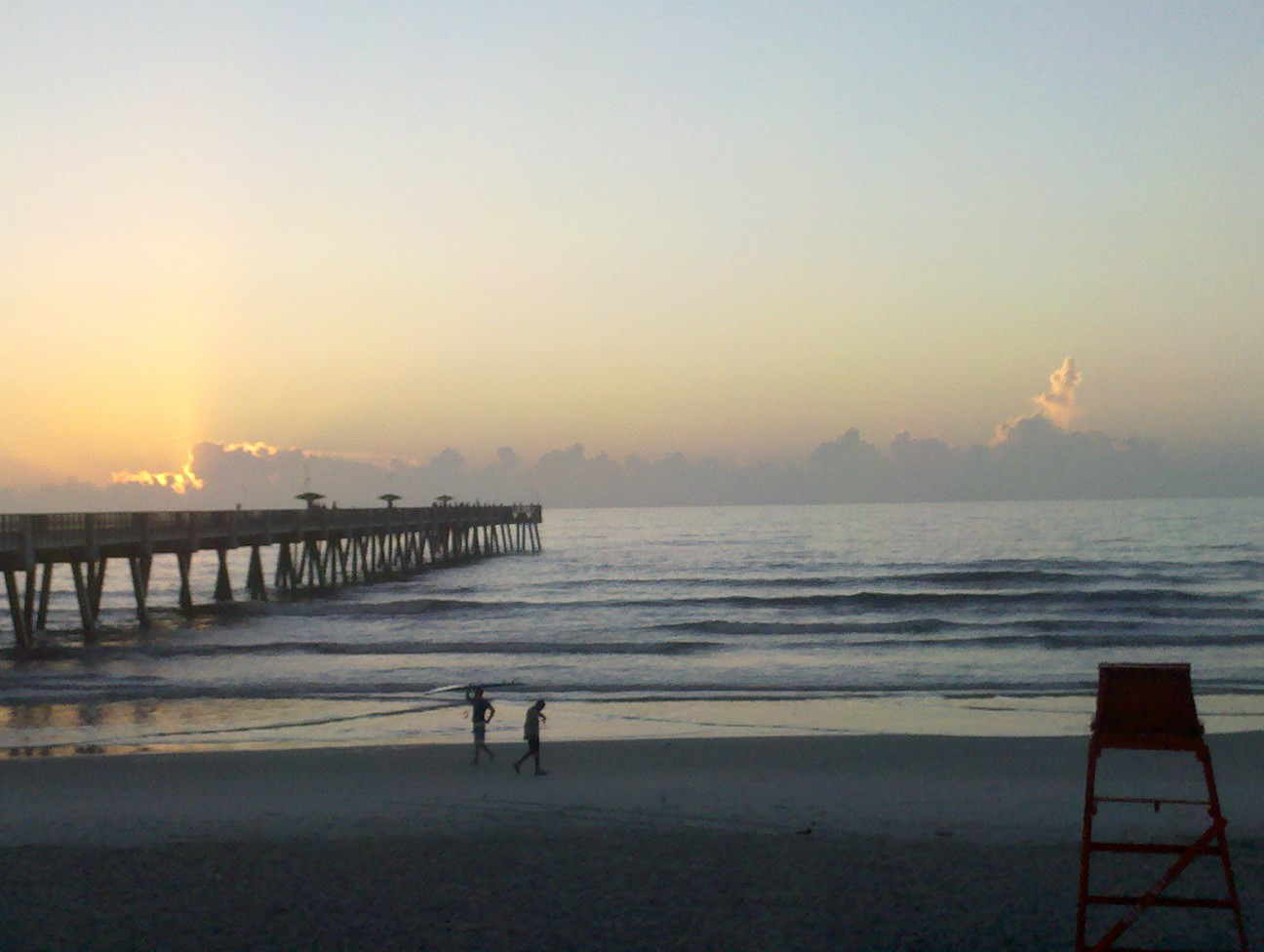
Jacksonville Beach Pier

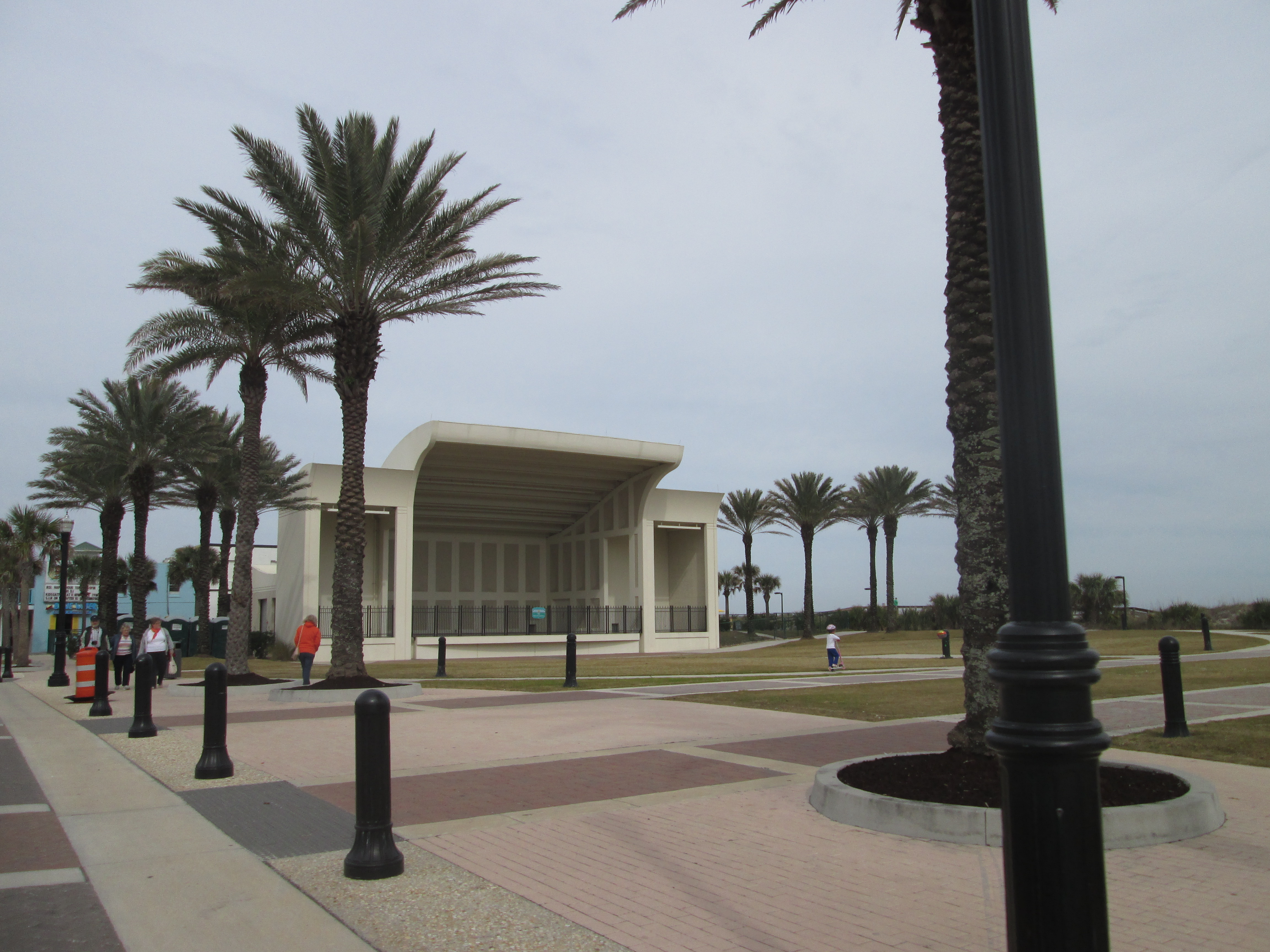
Sea Walk Pavilion

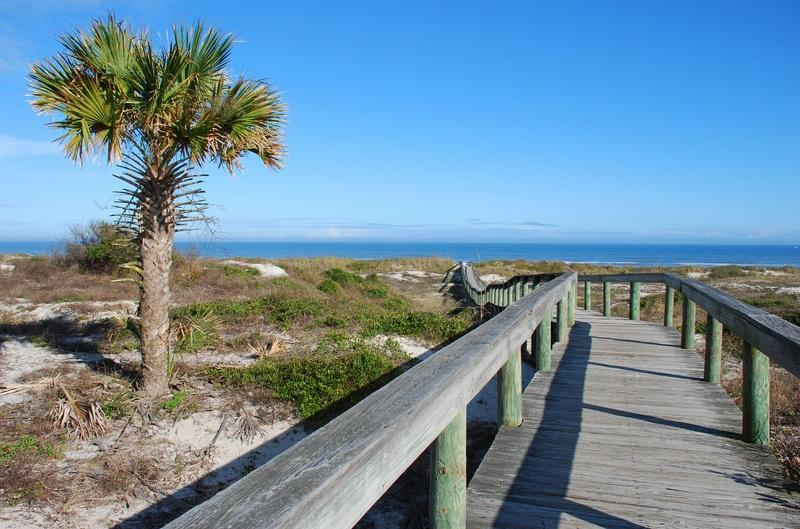
Hanna Park

== Demographics ==
Historical population
Census	Pop.	Note	%±
1910	249		—
1920	357		43.4%
1930	409		14.6%
1940	3,566		771.9%
1950	6,430		80.3%
1960	12,049		87.4%
1970	12,779		6.1%
1980	15,462		21.0%
1990	17,839		15.4%
2000	20,990		17.7%
2010	21,362		1.8%
2020	23,830		11.6%
2023 (est.)	23,447	▼	−1.6%
U.S. Decennial Census; 2020 Census

=== Racial and ethnic composition ===
Jacksonville Beach, Florida – racial and ethnic composition Note: the US Census treats Hispanic/Latino as an ethnic category. This table excludes Latinos from the racial categories and assigns them to a separate category. Hispanics/Latinos may be of any race.
Race / ethnicity (NH = non-Hispanic)	Pop. 2000	Pop. 2010	Pop. 2020	% 2000	% 2010	% 2020
White alone (NH)	18,675	18,784	20,261	88.97%	87.93%	85.02%
Black or African American alone (NH)	996	811	666	4.75%	3.80%	2.79%
Native American or Alaska Native alone (NH)	53	49	46	0.25%	0.23%	0.19%
Asian alone (NH)	341	358	467	1.62%	1.68%	1.96%
Pacific Islander alone (NH)	8	9	4	0.04%	0.04%	0.02%
Other race alone (NH)	21	21	116	0.10%	0.10%	0.49%
Mixed-race or multiracial (NH)	268	407	953	1.28%	1.91%	4.00%
Hispanic or Latino (any race)	628	923	1,317	2.99%	4.32%	5.53%
Total	20,990	21,362	23,830	100.00%	100.00%	100.00%

=== American Community Survey ===
As of the 2023 American Community Survey, there are 10,837 estimated households in Jacksonville Beach with an average of 2.16 persons per household. The city has a median household income of $115,825. Approximately 5.8% of the city's population lives at or below the poverty line. Jacksonville Beach has an estimated 73.8% employment rate, with 58.2% of the population holding a bachelor's degree or higher and 96.9% holding a high school diploma.

The top five reported ancestries (people were allowed to report up to two ancestries, thus the figures will generally add to more than 100%) were English (93.4%), Spanish (2.5%), Indo-European (3.1%), Asian and Pacific Islander (0.5%), and Other (0.3%).

=== 2020 census ===
As of the 2020 census, Jacksonville Beach had a population of 23,830 and 11,351 households, including 6,031 families. The population density was 3,256.4 inhabitants per square mile (1,257.3/km^{2}). The median age was 44.1 years; 3.1% of residents were under the age of 5, 14.4% were under 18, and 20.0% were 65 years of age or older. For every 100 females there were 97.6 males, and for every 100 females age 18 and over there were 96.3 males age 18 and over.

100.0% of residents lived in urban areas, while 0.0% lived in rural areas.

There were 11,351 households in Jacksonville Beach, of which 19.1% had children under the age of 18 living in them. Of all households, 41.1% were married-couple households, 22.9% were households with a male householder and no spouse or partner present, and 28.5% were households with a female householder and no spouse or partner present. About 35.4% of all households were made up of individuals and 13.1% had someone living alone who was 65 years of age or older.

There were 12,789 housing units at an average density of 1,748.1 per square mile (674.9/km^{2}), of which 11.2% were vacant. The homeowner vacancy rate was 1.2% and the rental vacancy rate was 6.4%.

Racial composition as of the 2020 census
Race	Number	Percent
White	20,655	86.7%
Black or African American	680	2.9%
American Indian and Alaska Native	59	0.2%
Asian	472	2.0%
Native Hawaiian and Other Pacific Islander	6	0.0%
Some other race	323	1.4%
Two or more races	1,635	6.9%

=== 2010 census ===
As of the 2010 census, there were 21,362 people, 10,040 households, and 4,987 families residing in the city. The population density was 2,913.2 inhabitants per square mile (1,124.8/km^{2}). There were 11,882 housing units at an average density of 1,621.0 per square mile (625.9/km^{2}). The racial makeup of the city was 90.94% White, 3.89% African American, 0.24% Native American, 1.73% Asian, 0.05% Pacific Islander, 0.91% from some other races and 2.24% from two or more races. Hispanic or Latino people of any race were 4.32% of the population.

=== 2000 census ===
As of the 2000 census, there were 20,990 people, 9,715 households, and 5,207 families residing in the city. The population density was 2,732.3 inhabitants per square mile (1,054.9/km^{2}). There were 10,775 housing units at an average density of 1,402.6 per square mile (541.5/km^{2}). The racial makeup of the city was 90.94% White, 4.82% African American, 0.27% Native American, 1.63% Asian, 0.04% Pacific Islander, 0.79% from some other races and 1.51% from two or more races. Hispanic or Latino people of any race were 2.99% of the population.

There were 9,715 households out of which 21.8% had children under the age of 18 living with them, 40.5% were married couples living together, 9.4% had a female householder with no husband present, and 46.4% were non-families. 34.6% of all households were made up of individuals and 9.2% had someone living alone who was 65 years of age or older. The average household size was 2.13 and the average family size was 2.78.

In the city, the population was spread out, with 18.0% under the age of 18, 8.7% from 18 to 24, 35.6% from 25 to 44, 24.7% from 45 to 64, and 13.0% who were 65 years of age or older. The median age was 38 years. For every 100 females, there were 100.7 males. For every 100 females age 18 and over, there were 99.7 males.

The median income for a household in the city was $46,922, and the median income for a family was $58,388. Males had a median income of $36,385 versus $30,055 for females. The per capita income for the city was $27,467. About 4.2% of families and 7.2% of the population were below the poverty line, including 8.2% of those under age 18 and 7.0% of those age 65 or over.

== Government ==
Since the 1968 consolidation between Duval County and the City of Jacksonville, Jacksonville Beach has been a separate municipality within the consolidated city of Jacksonville. As such, it has its own city manager, city council, and mayor, but it is subject to county-level governance by Jacksonville. The current mayor is Christine Hoffman, who was re-elected to a four-year term in November 2024.

== Transportation ==
Beach Boulevard (US 90) connects Jacksonville Beach to the Southside neighborhood of Jacksonville. It continues westward to downtown Jacksonville, via the Commodore Point Expressway and Hart Bridge. Butler Bouleveard (SR 202) begins in southeast Jacksonville at Philips Highway (US 1) and ends in southern Jacksonville Beach at 3rd Street South (SR A1A). SR A1A is a popular seaside scenic route extending from Fernandina Beach to Key West. In Jacksonville Beach it serves as the main commercial corridor, extending the length of the beachside community.

=== Major highways ===
- US 90
- SR A1A
- SR 202

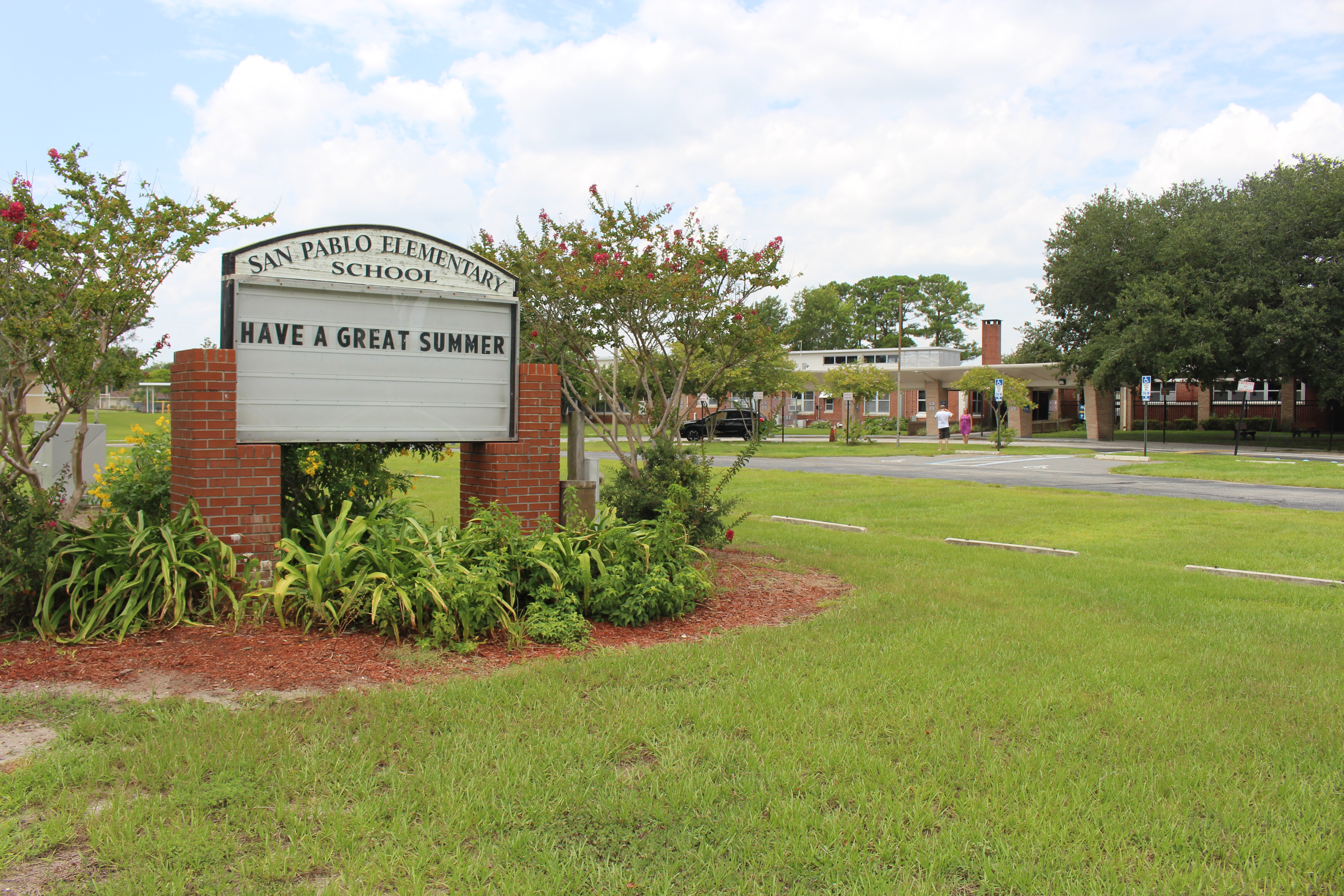
San Pablo Elementary School

== Education ==
The Duval County Public Schools district operates public schools, including San Pablo Elementary School, Jacksonville Beach Elementary, Seabreeze Elementary, and Fletcher Middle School in Jacksonville Beach.

== Notable people ==
- Jonas Blixt (born 1984), professional golfer
- Ben Cooper (born 1982), musician
- Matt Every (born 1983), professional golfer
- Billy Horschel (born 1986), professional golfer
- David Lingmerth (born 1987), professional golfer
- Donna Orender (born 1957), sports executive, former college and professional basketball player
- Francis E. Spinner (1802–1890), treasurer of the United States during the Civil War
- Tim Tebow (born 1987), professional baseball player, former professional football player

== See also ==
- Jacksonville Beaches
- Greater Jacksonville
- National Register of Historic Places listings in Duval County, Florida
