= First Coast News =

TV newsroom in Jacksonville, Florida

- The home page of First Coast News from September 18, 2024
- Website type: News website
- Available in: English; Spanish
- Owners: Tegna Inc., a subsidiary of Nexstar Media Group
- Website: www.firstcoastnews.com
- Commercial: Yes
- Registration: No

First Coast News is the newsroom of television stations WTLV (channel 12) and WJXX (channel 25), the NBC and ABC affiliates in Jacksonville, Florida, United States. It is owned with the stations by the Tegna subsidiary of Nexstar Media Group.

The First Coast News brand was first used by the stations on April 27, 2000, in the wake of Gannett's acquisition of WJXX the month before and consequent expansion of what had primarily been WTLV's news department. Immediately upon taking control, WTLV newscasts were simulcast on WJXX. Since the consolidation, First Coast News has generally remained in second place in the market behind WJXT (channel 4), the market news leader.

== History ==
=== Pre-FCN ===
When WTLV started as WFGA-TV in 1957, the station's first news director was Harold Baker, who had served in the same position at WSM radio and television in Nashville, Tennessee. Baker would anchor the station's 6 p.m. news for 17 years and direct the nascent channel 12 newsroom for 19 years in total, winning the station major national journalism awards. It became WTLV in 1971, and eventually settled in as a consistent second-place finisher to WJXT in local news, except for two brief periods in the early 1960s and 1975. While it was frequently well behind channel 4, channel 12 worked to close the gap, particularly after its acquisition by Gannett in 1988. In the early 1990s, WTLV mounted a strong challenge to WJXT, particularly in late news, only to slip when that station expanded its newscasts and increased its community involvement.

Meanwhile, in 1996, Allbritton Communications secured the ABC affiliation for the Jacksonville market from longtime third-rated station WJKS (channel 17), which it intended to use on WBSG-TV in Brunswick, Georgia. This station's signal barely reached into Florida. Initial plans for a new WBSG-TV tower at Kingsland, Georgia, were held up by objections, and station management was only able to obtain approval for upgrades to its tower site in Hickox, Georgia, west of Brunswick but not south. This signal did not cover all of Jacksonville, with no coverage south of Interstate 10.

Though WJKS and WBSG originally planned to switch in April 1997, these plans changed in January after the outgoing ABC affiliate unexpectedly began preempting more than half the network's prime-time lineup and any new shows the network offered. As part of its transition to becoming The WB affiliate for the First Coast, WJKS replaced the preempted ABC shows with The WB's programming and syndicated shows. This caused Allbritton and the network to examine more immediate options to bring ABC programs to Jacksonville. Allbritton leased and activated a dormant construction permit for channel 25 in Orange Park, a suburb of Jacksonville, which it built out and signed on as WJXX on February 9, 1997, with WBSG as its semi-satellite. For most of the rest of that year, technical and signal issues dogged the new ABC affiliate, weighing on its public perception. Due to the compressed timetable, WJXX operated from an interim transmitter facility until September; it would not offer a direct feed to the area's cable systems until December.

While the station had been airing a local newsmagazine program, it was not until WJXX opened a permanent studio facility in south Jacksonville that it began to produce a full local news service on December 15, 1997. While ABC 25 News was hailed as a superior product compared to WJKS, which had aired just two 30-minute newscasts on weekdays, Allbritton faced several overwhelming factors in establishing WJXX: in addition to the technical issues that alienated viewers and continued signal deficiencies in some areas, the market had historically been an underperformer for the ABC network, and WJXT and WTLV were entrenched in the market. Channel 17, now WJWB, surged past WJXX in the ratings.

=== Consolidation ===
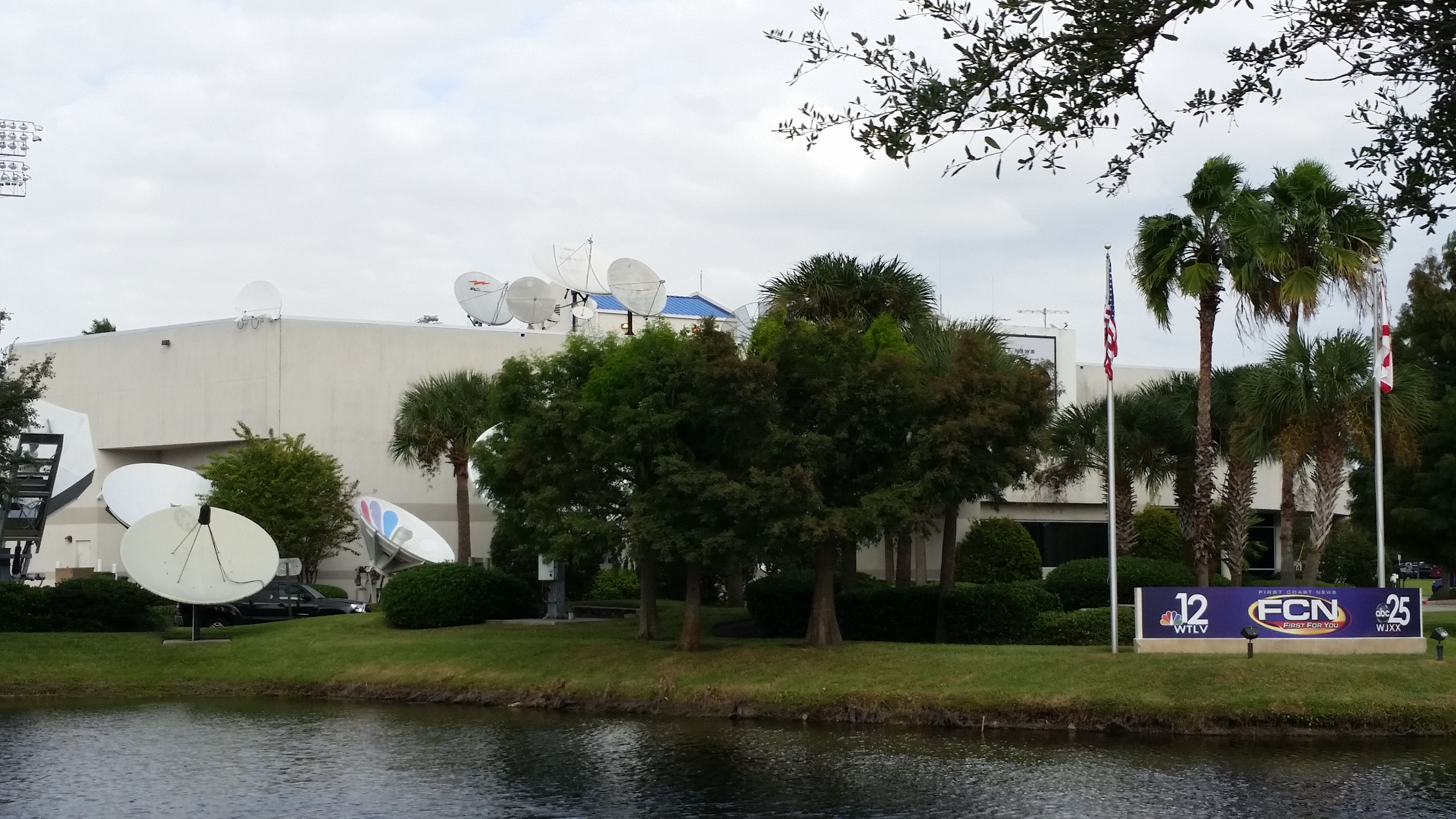
The WTLV–WJXX studios on Adams Street in Jacksonville

On November 15, 1999, the FCC legalized television station duopolies—the common ownership of two stations in one market. The next day, November 16, Gannett announced it would purchase WJXX from Allbritton. The deal was initiated after Allbritton approached Gannett about a possible sale. The new duopoly rules barred one company from owning two of the four highest-rated stations in a market, which would have normally had the effect of barring common ownership of two "Big Four" affiliates. However, WJXX's unusually low ratings for an ABC affiliate made the sale legal. For the next four months, planning was initiated on the eventual consolidation of the WTLV and WJXX news operations. While WJXX continued to produce newscasts during this time, it faced a growing exodus of newsroom staffers. The merged news department was to be dominated by WTLV holdovers.

The Federal Communications Commission approved the sale on March 16, 2000. Gannett consummated the purchase the next day and immediately implemented a simulcast of WTLV's newscasts on WJXX, while construction began at the WTLV studios on Adams Street—which had been enlarged in 1997—to prepare for a new combined news service under the name First Coast News, which debuted on April 27. Newscasts continued to be broadcast at the same time on each station, including the WJXX 7 p.m. newscast, which had no competition and was the station's lone successful news program. In total, 36 WJXX employees, including 13 in news, joined the WTLV operation.

=== A consistent second-place ===
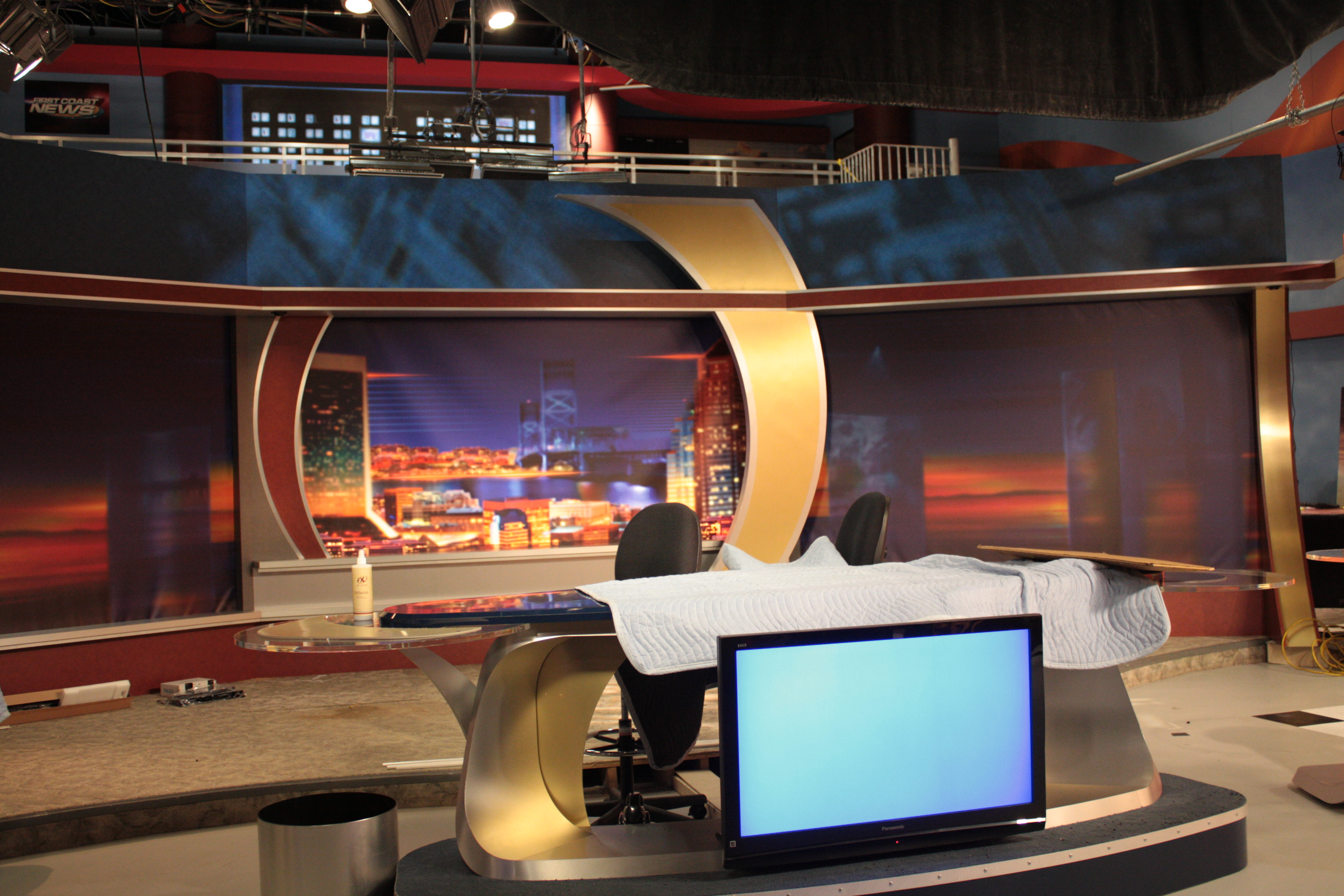
News set used by First Coast News in the 2010s

After the merger, continuing a trend already set by WTLV, the gap in viewership between First Coast News and market leader WJXT slowly closed to create tough competition in the Jacksonville market. The combination of WTLV and WJXX also surpassed WJXT in total revenue.

In 2002, the news department of Fox affiliate WAWS (channel 30) expanded to accommodate the move of the CBS affiliation to WTEV-TV (channel 47). The two stations rebranded as WFOX-TV and WJAX-TV and their news as Action News in 2014 as part of a wholesale change which included the firing of the previous main anchors. The Action News revamp improved ratings at the traditional third-place news operation in Jacksonville just as First Coast News remained without a news director for a year, causing a decline in viewership, and several key news personalities defected to Action News. Rob Mennie, who assumed the post of news director in 2014, noted of the newsroom as he encountered it, "This was a station ... I'll just use the word confused. They didn't know who they were. ... They were trying to figure out what makes us tick." In 2023, Action News edged out First Coast News at 11 p.m. in total households but not in viewers 25–54, with both newscasts behind WJXT, which has remained Jacksonville's news leader as an independent station.

Logo for First Coast News from 2017 to 2021

== Notable staff ==
* Victor Blackwell – anchor

- Jeannie Blaylock – anchor, since 1985
- Donna Deegan – anchor, 1988–2012 (known as Donna Clewis until 1990 and Donna Hicken until 2007)
- Curtis Dvorak – morning show contributor and co-host of First Coast Living
- Alan Gionet – anchor, 1998–2006
- Dan Hicken – sports anchor, 1986–2013
- Shannon Ogden – co-anchor, 2006–2016
