= WJXX =

Television station in Orange Park, Florida

- Orange Park–Jacksonville, Florida; United States
- City: Orange Park, Florida
- Channels: Digital: 10 (VHF); Virtual: 25
- Branding: WJXX ABC 25; First Coast News

Programming
- Affiliations: 25.1: ABC; for others, see § Subchannels

Ownership
- Owner: Tegna Inc., a subsidiary of Nexstar Media Group; (Multimedia Holdings Corporation)
- Sister stations: WTLV

History
- First air date: February 9, 1997
- Former channel numbers: Analog: 25 (UHF, 1997–2009)
- Call sign meaning: "Jax" (informal abbreviation for Jacksonville)

Technical information
- Licensing authority: FCC
- Facility ID: 11893
- ERP: 29.5 kW
- HAAT: 290.7 m (954 ft)
- Transmitter coordinates: 30°16′25″N 81°33′12″W

Links
- Public license information: Public file; LMS
- Website: www.firstcoastnews.com

WJXX (channel 25) is a television station licensed to Orange Park, Florida, United States, serving the Jacksonville area as an affiliate of ABC. It is owned by the Tegna subsidiary of Nexstar Media Group alongside NBC affiliate WTLV (channel 12). The two stations share studios on East Adams Street (near EverBank Stadium) in downtown Jacksonville; WJXX's transmitter is located on Anders Boulevard on the south side of the city.

Though plans for an Orange Park television station dated to 1977 and the construction permit to 1988, it took upheaval in the city's ABC affiliation to induce the construction of channel 25, which began broadcasting in February 1997. The launch was moved two months ahead of schedule after outgoing ABC affiliate WJKS-TV ceased airing more than half of the network's prime time lineup and intended ABC affiliate WBSG-TV was unable to adequately cover the market. Due to the compressed timetable, permanent transmission facilities were not built out for another seven months. The ensuing issues hampered WJXX's efforts to make a good impression with viewers in Jacksonville, a market that has been historically weak for the ABC network. Even though the founding owner, Allbritton Communications, built studios and started a local news team, WJXX made little headway in the ratings. The problems caused by the early launch proved insurmountable, leading Allbritton to sell WJXX to Gannett, owner of WTLV, just as common ownership of two stations in a market was permitted. Gannett merged the two stations at WTLV's studios in 2000 and began to simulcast nearly all local newscasts under the name First Coast News.

== History ==
=== Early years ===
In 1977, a group known as Clay Television, Inc., was formed and petitioned the Federal Communications Commission (FCC) to allocate channel 25 to Orange Park, a community in Clay County, Florida, 12 miles (19 km) south of Jacksonville. The FCC allocated the channel in January 1980, and in October, Clay filed an application for a construction permit to build the proposed station. Principals in Clay Television consisted of Richard Fellows, a former city manager in Green Cove Springs and Orange Park; his son; and three Clay County physicians and their wives. A second application was received for the channel in early 1981 from Orange Park Florida T.V., a company majority-owned by Malcolm Glazer.

In 1982, an FCC administrative law judge refused to grant the construction permit and returned both applications. Clay Television had experienced a cumulative change of 50 percent of ownership, which, per the judge, required refiling; Orange Park Florida T.V. was "basically and technically unqualified" because its antenna site did not meet minimum spacing requirements to other stations. The FCC then permitted Clay to cure the defect on its application, citing uncertainty about processing practices, and ultimately granted a construction permit in October 1982; the former action was vacated by the United States Court of Appeals for the District of Columbia Circuit in 1987 and remanded to the FCC. The FCC reviewed the action in 1988; deeming that continuing the lengthy comparative hearing was not in the public interest as Orange Park had continued to wait for new TV service, it upheld Clay's victory. As part of a sequential assignment of television station call signs across the United States in 1989, Clay Television received the call sign WYDP. (Note: Other stations assigned call signs that same day include WYDC in Corning, New York, and WYDO in Greenville, North Carolina.)

The station remained unbuilt due to financial difficulties. In December 1992, after offering WYDP to the Clay County school board, Clay Television filed to sell the construction permit to the University of North Florida. The university proposed to partner with public television station WJCT (channel 7) to build WYDP as a student-run TV station if the Florida Board of Regents would approve the financial outlay.

=== ABC upheaval ===
On February 16, 1996, Allbritton Communications Company announced it would purchase WBSG-TV (channel 21) in Brunswick, Georgia, north of Jacksonville in Glynn County, for $10.5 million. Allbritton simultaneously announced that its entire station group would either renew their existing ABC affiliations or—in the case of stations in Charleston, South Carolina; in and around Birmingham, Alabama; and WBSG-TV in Brunswick—switch to ABC. At the time, WBSG-TV operated as an affiliate of The WB and also had a news department producing local newscasts covering southeast Georgia, though it was not considered the WB affiliate of record in Jacksonville; the local newscasts had gone on the air with the station in April 1990 and been cut back to early and late evening airings by 1996. Allbritton announced that it would repurpose WBSG-TV as a full-market ABC affiliate for Jacksonville by building a full station facility there. The news blindsided WJKS (channel 17), which had served as the ABC affiliate for the First Coast from 1966 to 1980 and again since 1988. The switch was to occur on January 1, 1997, making the Jacksonville switch among the last in a years-long period of national affiliation realignment that had started in 1994.

However, WBSG-TV's transmission facility in Hickox, Georgia, did not provide sufficient coverage of Jacksonville, particularly homes south of Interstate 10. As a consequence, Allbritton filed to erect a new 2,000-foot (610 m) tower in Kingsland, Georgia. WJKS attempted to block this move by making its own application for a tower in Kingsland, though it retracted this request; the FCC rejected WBSG's Kingsland proposal, leading Allbritton to instead increase the height and power of the existing WBSG-TV facility, though this did little to expand coverage to the south. By August 1996, when the FCC approved the upgraded Hickox facility, the affiliation switch had been put off until at least February, and WJKS had given up its fight to remain with ABC.

We've been put in a position where we need to accelerate the process so we can get the people in Jacksonville the programs they want as quickly as possible.

— Leonard Firestone, general manager, WBSG-TV, on throwing forward the affiliation switch

A date of April 1, 1997, was eventually fixed for WBSG-TV to assume the ABC affiliation in Jacksonville. However, those plans changed in January 1997. With little warning, WJKS started extensive preemptions of ABC programs as part of its transition to become Jacksonville's affiliate of The WB. Of 22 prime time hours offered by ABC, WJKS refused to clear 12 1/2 hours as well as any new programs introduced by ABC. This included all of ABC's Sunday and Thursday night programming; the station had already preempted Dangerous Minds on Monday nights and the Saturday night movie. The schedule change was so abrupt that it came after The Florida Times-Union published its weekly television listings; viewers were told to consult the paper's daily program grids instead. Channel 17 continued to broadcast the network's five most popular shows, as well as ABC's network news and soap operas. The uncleared programs were replaced with syndicated shows and programming from The WB. Even though 70 percent of Jacksonville television households subscribed to cable, those that did not and could not receive WBSG-TV were at risk of losing all access to ABC network programming. The scramble to ensure the First Coast would retain access to ABC programming led ABC and Allbritton to agree to accelerate the switch from April 1 to February.

To make up for WBSG's coverage shortfall in the market, Allbritton reached a deal to activate the long-dormant WYDP construction permit, which had been sold in the interim to WRP L.P., under a local marketing agreement. The compressed timetable forced Allbritton to build an interim facility to provide network coverage to Jacksonville, particularly the southern and western portions of the market where WBSG could not be seen at all.

On February 9, 1997, channel 25 came to air under new WJXX call letters. It became the third station in Jacksonville to affiliate with ABC; WTLV had carried the network from 1980 to 1988. Simultaneously, WBSG-TV joined ABC as a semi-satellite of WJXX. For viewers in Georgia dependent on the WBSG-TV transmitter, the switch went well despite reports of "slightly grainy" reception; that station broke off from WJXX's feed to continue airing its regional newscasts. Viewers in the Jacksonville area relying on the interim WJXX installation from the final transmitter site, north of Lake Asbury, were greeted with a "patchy" signal; one cable company serving St. Augustine could not get a clean signal to feed to 24,000 subscribers. Even in cable households, picture quality left much to be desired; while its permanent studio was under construction, WJXX sent its signal to cable systems from its transmitters rather than via a direct fiber-optic link. Further problems came when MediaOne, the primary cable provider in Jacksonville, placed WJXX on channel 7 at Allbritton's request. However, this caused ingress issues with the over-the-air signal of WJCT on the same frequency; the problem was not alleviated until MediaOne moved the station to channel 5. Even then, WJXX did not provide a direct feed to MediaOne until December. Closed captioning was unavailable, even for ABC network programming, for nearly six months.

In April, Allbritton filed instead to buy WJXX outright while leasing WBSG-TV, paying $5 million for channel 25. The deal was concluded in September.

=== A dual construction project ===
The rush job of ensuring the partial continuity of ABC programming in the Jacksonville area was completed, leaving Allbritton with three remaining tasks: installing the permanent transmitter facility, constructing local studios, and hiring a news team. The former was finished first, but FCC authorization to activate the new antenna was delayed; pressure by local U.S. representative Tillie Fowler helped WJXX secure FCC authorization for its permanent facility in September, in time for the Jacksonville Jaguars' first home game on Monday Night Football. Even with WJXX at full power, several close-in suburbs such as Atlantic Beach needed cable to watch the station.

Meanwhile, Allbritton acquired a parcel of land on A. C. Skinner Parkway, visible from J. Turner Butler Boulevard, to build a 28,000-square-foot (2,600 m^{2}) studio facility. The site was designed to accommodate 100 employees, including a news staff of 60 to begin producing local newscasts for the First Coast. In the interim, a 7 p.m. magazine program, ABC 25 Tonight, began airing as the station's only local program.

On December 15, 1997, ABC 25 News debuted from the new studio with 4 1/2 hours each weekday of local news programming, most of it simulcast on WBSG-TV. Most of the anchors came from outside the market, having last worked in such markets as Orlando, Boston, and Atlanta; Donna Savarese moved from a job in Hartford, Connecticut, to work at WJXX. In March 1998, WBSG-TV ceased producing full-length 7 and 11 p.m. newscasts, with southeast Georgia news instead provided from Jacksonville as inserts into WJXX's newscasts; 11 jobs were lost.

In June 1998, ABC parent The Walt Disney Company entered into negotiations to purchase the eight Allbritton stations and the LMAs with WJXX and WJSU-TV, reportedly offering the company more than $1 billion to acquire them. The sale would have made WJXX the first commercial station in Jacksonville to be an owned-and-operated station of a network. Negotiations between Disney and Allbritton broke down when the former dropped out of discussions to buy the stations the following month.

Allbritton faced a tough task establishing WJXX in the market. Due to the affiliation switch and construction of WJXX being brought forward to prevent ABC from losing much of the Jacksonville market for a two-month period, attention was diverted to the installation of temporary facilities. The seven months of inadequate transmitter coverage of Jacksonville and the even longer stretch without a direct feed to cable providers confused and alienated viewers just as channel 25 needed to make a good first impression. Furthermore, historically, ABC had usually not performed well in the Jacksonville market. In 2003, Times-Union television editor Charlie Patton noted that "Jacksonville never acquired the ABC habit". Total-day ratings trailed the other major network stations in Jacksonville as well as WJKS—which had become WJWB, one of the nation's top WB affiliates—though they were on an upswing by the fall 1999–2000 television season. News ratings, despite a product considered superior to that WJKS had produced as an ABC affiliate, lagged longtime Jacksonville news leaders WJXT and WTLV; one bright spot was the market's only local newscast at 7 p.m.

=== Duopoly with WTLV ===
On November 15, 1999, the FCC legalized television station duopolies—the common ownership of two stations in one market. The next day, November 16, the Gannett Company, owner of WTLV, announced it would purchase WJXX from Allbritton. The deal was initiated after Allbritton approached Gannett about a possible sale. The new duopoly rules barred cross-ownership of two of the top four television stations in the same market, a restriction that typically prevented Big Four network affiliates from coming under common ownership. However, WJXX's fifth-place finish in total-day ratings, somewhat lower than most ABC affiliates, allowed the deal to go forward.

The news came as a surprise to channel 25's employees, who believed Allbritton was committed to building itself up in Jacksonville despite low ratings. It became apparent within a month that WTLV's recently expanded facilities and newsroom would form the core of the combined operation and that most of the combined operation's staffers would be WTLV holdovers. Staffers started to leave WJXX in sufficient numbers that WJXX's general manager, Lewis Robertson, warned that employees from other Allbritton stations might have to be seconded to Jacksonville to maintain station operations in the interim until Gannett took control.

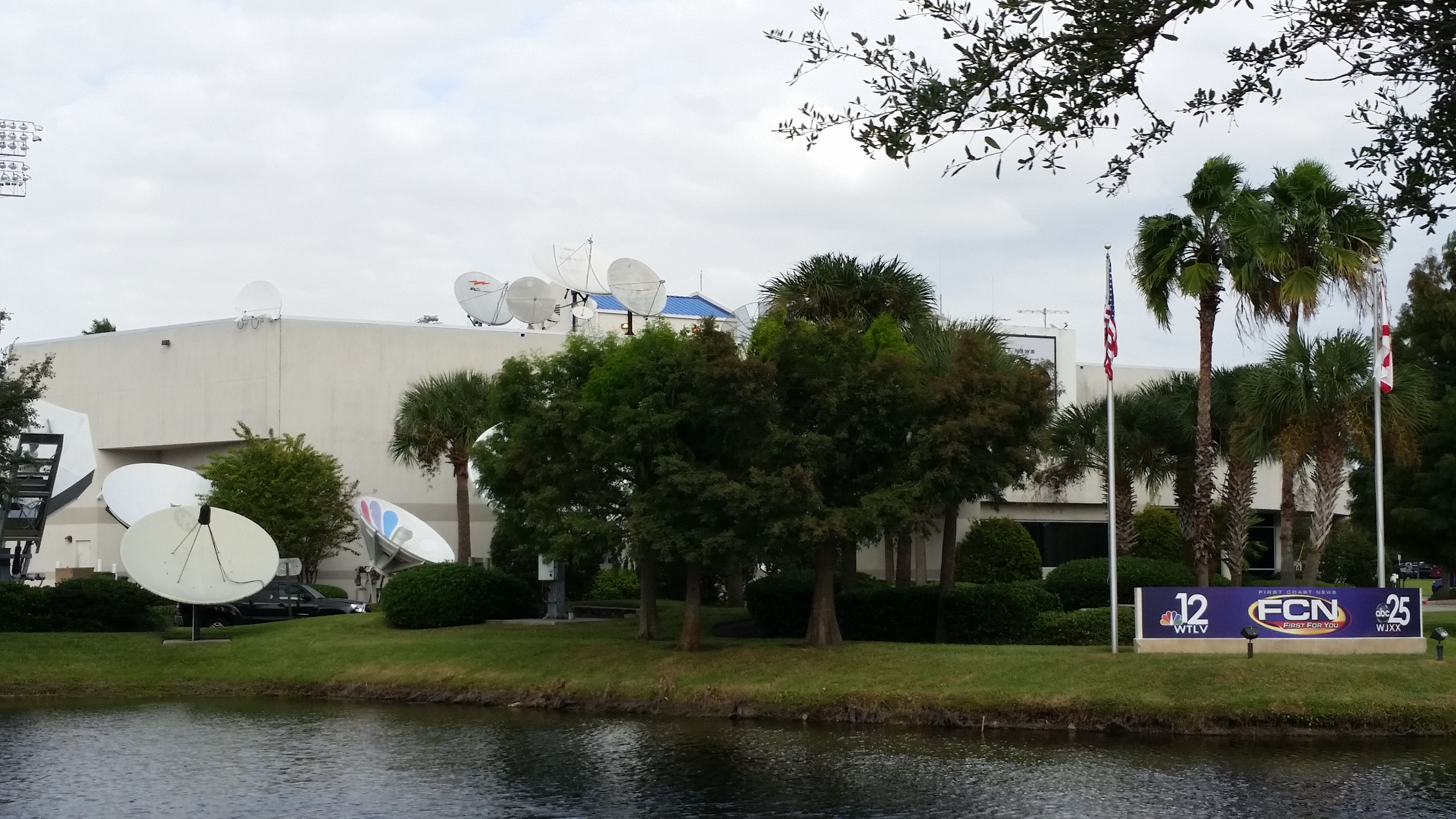
The WTLV–WJXX studios on Adams Street in Jacksonville

The FCC approved the purchase on March 16, 2000. Gannett took control the next morning, and about 36 WJXX employees—including 13 in news—joined the new combined WTLV operation, which immediately began simulcasting newscasts on both stations before relaunching on April 27 under the umbrella brand of First Coast News. Newscasts continued to be broadcast at the same time on each station, including the WJXX 7 p.m. newscast.

WBSG-TV was not included in the sale, and Allbritton converted it to programming from the Pax network. For a time, this left much of the Georgia side of the market without access to ABC programming; WJXX's signal was marginal to nonexistent in that portion even after activating its permanent facility. Some south Georgia cable companies supplemented the market with WJCL in Savannah after Pax network owner Paxson Communications Corporation purchased WBSG-TV later in 2000; that station is now WPXC-TV.

In a post-mortem that ran in the Times-Union a month after Gannett bought WJXX, a number of Jacksonville television veterans suggested that many of WJXX's problems were of its own making. WJWB general manager Mike Liff claimed Allbritton put too much emphasis on getting channel 25's new studios online, saying that a longstanding tenet of the television business called for "focus(ing) on your power, your programs, your promotion, and your people". He added that Allbritton was in "denial" over its problems for a long time. WJXT general manager Sherry Burns suggested that Allbritton made some "unfortunate missteps" in the early going and appeared to bring WJXX online "before they were ready". Former WTLV news director Jay Solomon said that WJXX's technical snafus hindered its ability to establish itself, despite Allbritton's efforts to produce a quality product. He added that channel 25 faced an uphill battle against long-established WJXT and WTLV, especially WJXT, whose primary anchor team had been together for over two decades at the time.

It took nearly two years for Gannett to dispose of the mothballed A. C. Skinner Parkway studio, with its prominent clock tower visible from Butler Boulevard. None of the other major stations in the market needed a new studio at the time. Two attempts to sell the property fell through before a consortium of investors acquired the building in 2002 and leased it to cellular company VoiceStream Wireless.

On June 29, 2015, the Gannett Company split into two separate companies, with one side specializing in print media and the other side specializing in broadcast and digital media. WJXX and WTLV—along with Gannett's other television station properties—were retained by the latter company, named Tegna. Nexstar Media Group acquired Tegna in a deal announced in August 2025 and completed on March 19, 2026.

== News operation ==
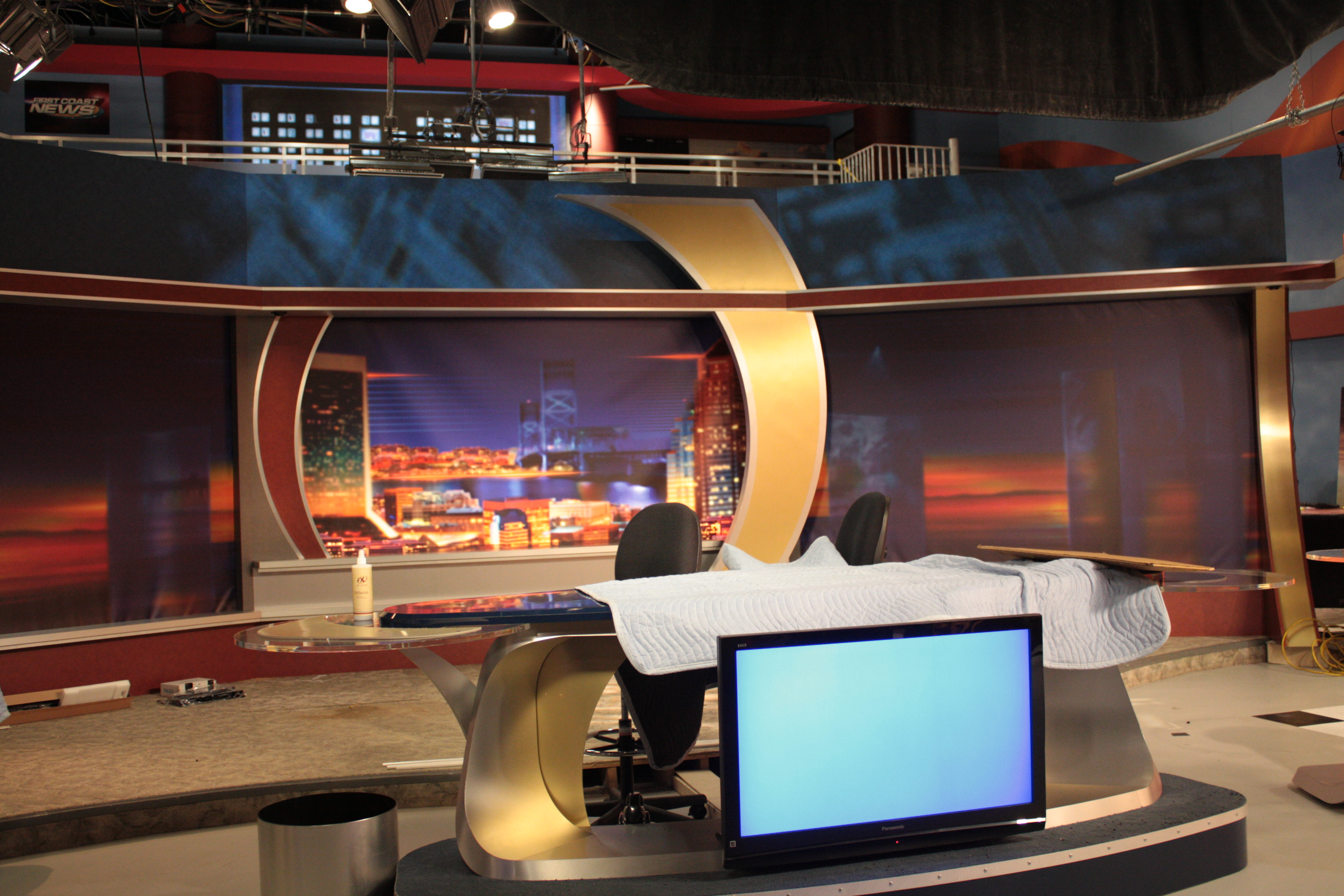
News set used by First Coast News in the 2010s

After the merger, continuing a trend already set by WTLV, the gap in viewership between First Coast News and market leader WJXT slowly closed to create tough competition in the Jacksonville market. The combination of WTLV and WJXX also surpassed WJXT in total revenue.

In 2002, the news department of Fox affiliate WAWS (channel 30) expanded to accommodate the move of the CBS affiliation to WTEV-TV (channel 47). The two stations rebranded as WFOX-TV and WJAX-TV and their news as Action News in 2014 as part of a wholesale change which included the firing of the previous main anchors. The Action News revamp improved ratings at the traditional third-place news operation in Jacksonville just as First Coast News remained without a news director for a year, causing a decline in viewership, and several key news personalities defected to Action News. Rob Mennie, who assumed the post of news director in 2014, noted of the newsroom as he encountered it, "This was a station ... I'll just use the word confused. They didn't know who they were. ... They were trying to figure out what makes us tick." In 2023, Action News edged out First Coast News at 11 p.m. in total households but not in viewers 25–54, with both newscasts behind WJXT, which has remained Jacksonville's news leader as an independent station.

The logo for WJXX, used until 2021.

=== Notable staff ===
* Victor Blackwell – anchor[59]

- Jeannie Blaylock – anchor, since 2000
- Donna Deegan – anchor, 2000–2012 (known as Donna Hicken until 2007)
- Curtis Dvorak – morning show contributor and co-host of First Coast Living
- Alan Gionet – anchor, 2000–2006
- Dan Hicken – sports anchor, 2000–2013
- Shannon Ogden – co-anchor, 2006–2016

== Technical information ==
=== Subchannels ===
WJXX's transmitter is located on Anders Boulevard on the south side of Jacksonville. The station's signal is multiplexed:

Subchannels of WJXX
Subchannel	Res.	Short name	Programming
25.1	720p	WJXX-HD	ABC
25.2	480i	WEATHER	Weather
25.3	480i	Quest	Quest
25.4	480i	Mystery	Ion Mystery
25.5	480i	NEST	The Nest
25.6	480i	NOSEY	Nosey
25.7	480i	OUTLAW	Outlaw
25.8	480i	365BLK	365BLK

=== Analog-to-digital conversion ===
WJXX began broadcasting a digital signal on April 15, 2002. On June 12, 2009, WJXX terminated its analog signal, on UHF channel 25, as part of the federally mandated transition from analog to digital television. The station's digital signal remained on its pre-transition VHF channel 10, using virtual channel 25.
