= WPXC-TV =

Television station in Brunswick, Georgia, United States

- Brunswick, Georgia; Jacksonville, Florida; United States
- City: Brunswick, Georgia
- Channels: Digital: 24 (UHF); Virtual: 21

Programming
- Affiliations: 21.1: Ion Television; for others, see § Subchannels

Ownership
- Owner: Ion Media; (Ion Media License Company, LLC)

History
- Founded: December 28, 1987
- First air date: April 2, 1990
- Former call signs: WBSG-TV (1990–2001)
- Former channel number: Analog: 21 (UHF, 1990–2009)
- Former affiliations: Independent (1990–1995); The WB (1995–1997); ABC (1997–2000)
- Call sign meaning: Paxson Communications (original name of current owner)

Technical information
- Licensing authority: FCC
- Facility ID: 71236
- ERP: 790 kW
- HAAT: 417 m (1,368 ft)
- Transmitter coordinates: 30°49′39″N 81°44′27″W

Links
- Public license information: Public file; LMS
- Website: iontelevision.com

WPXC-TV (channel 21) is a television station licensed to Brunswick, Georgia, United States, broadcasting the Ion Television network to the Jacksonville, Florida, area. It is the only major commercial station in the Jacksonville market that is licensed in Georgia. The station is owned by the Ion Media subsidiary of the E. W. Scripps Company and broadcasts from a transmitter in southwestern Camden County, Georgia, northwest of Kingsland.

Channel 21 began broadcasting as WBSG-TV on April 2, 1990. It was an independent station owned by Coastal Com, Inc., and had studios on Blythe Island Highway (State Route 303) in southwestern Brunswick, as well as a full local news department serving coastal southeastern Georgia. In 1995, WBSG-TV became the nearest affiliate of The WB to Jacksonville. Allbritton Communications purchased WBSG-TV in 1996 and immediately announced it would become the new ABC affiliate for Jacksonville, replacing WJKS-TV. An attempt to move the tower from its original location at Hickox south to Kingsland was delayed, but a height increase allowed the station to put a fringe signal into areas of Jacksonville north of Interstate 10. When WJKS-TV without warning preempted more than half of ABC's prime time shows beginning in January 1997, WJXX (channel 25) was rushed into service to fill the gap. WJXX soon became the primary station in the arrangement; the Brunswick news operation was closed in 1998.

When Allbritton sold WJXX to Gannett in 2000, WBSG-TV was not included. It immediately switched to programming from the Pax network, predecessor to Ion, and was sold outright to the network later that year.

== History ==
=== Establishment and early years ===
Plans for a commercial television station in Brunswick dated to 1979, when the Federal Communications Commission (FCC) allotted the city channel 21 at the request of COR Communications. COR then applied for the construction permit to build the proposed station. COR Communications was hopeful that their station could attract a national network affiliation. Two other groups—CMM, Inc., and Golden East Broadcasters—also applied for channel 21, and the FCC designated all three applications for comparative hearing in 1983. COR won the construction permit, but its station was never built, and an attempt to replace the construction permit was denied in September 1986.

In December 1986, Richard Huff applied for channel 21 through Coastal Com, Inc. Coastal Com and two other firms' applications were designated for comparative hearing in 1987, and in November, an FCC administrative law judge awarded Coastal Com the permit by summary decision. Coastal Com went public with its plans for WBSG-TV and broke ground on the studios on State Route 303 in August 1989; the station revealed its plans for a news department. The station was envisioned as filling a gap in programming and news coverage that stations in Jacksonville, Florida, and Savannah, Georgia, did not cover.

WBSG-TV began broadcasting on April 2, 1990. It offered news at 6 and 10 p.m. on weeknights and an hour-long local morning show. Because of its distance from Jacksonville and Savannah, the station was able to air some of the same syndicated programs as stations in those markets. WBSG later became an affiliate of The WB; by 1996, it employed 37, including a news staff of nine.

=== ABC affiliation ===
On February 16, 1996, Allbritton Communications announced it had agreed to purchase WBSG-TV from Coastal Com for $10.5 million and that the station would become the new ABC affiliate for the Jacksonville market in 1997 as part of a group affiliation agreement with the network. Allbritton announced it would build a new transmitter facility for WBSG, since its existing facility did not reach Jacksonville. It also planned to move the station's operations to new studio facilities in Jacksonville in much the same way that WESH, the NBC affiliate for the Orlando market, was nominally licensed to Daytona Beach while operating primarily from the Orlando suburbs. The news blindsided Jacksonville's existing ABC affiliate, WJKS-TV (channel 17).

To improve WBSG's coverage, Allbritton filed to build a new tower at a site near Kingsland. The site was roughly halfway between Brunswick and Jacksonville, and approximately 3 mi (4.8 km) from the Florida border. WJKS attempted to block this move by making its own application for a tower in Kingsland, though it retracted this request. The FCC rejected WBSG's Kingsland proposal, leading Allbritton to instead increase the height and power of the existing WBSG-TV facility, though this did little to expand coverage to the south. By August 1996, when the FCC approved the upgraded Hickox facility, the affiliation switch had been put off until at least February, and WJKS had given up its fight to remain with ABC. The outright acquisition was converted to a local marketing agreement in August 1996.

We've been put in a position where we need to accelerate the process so we can get the people in Jacksonville the programs they want as quickly as possible.

— Leonard Firestone, general manager, WBSG-TV, on throwing forward the affiliation switch

A date of April 1, 1997, was eventually fixed for WBSG-TV to assume the ABC affiliation in Jacksonville. However, in January 1997, with almost no advance warning, WJKS started extensive preemptions of ABC programs as part of its transition to become Jacksonville's affiliate of The WB. Of 22 prime time hours offered by ABC, WJKS refused to clear 12 1/2 hours as well as any new programs introduced by ABC. This included all of ABC's Sunday and Thursday night programming; the station had already preempted Dangerous Minds on Monday nights and the Saturday night movie. The schedule change was so abrupt that it came after The Florida Times-Union published its weekly television listings; viewers were told to consult the paper's daily program grids instead. Channel 17 continued to broadcast the network's five most popular shows, as well as ABC's network news and soap operas. The uncleared programs were replaced with syndicated shows and programming from The WB.

WJKS's increased preemptions upended ABC and Allbritton's timetable. WBSG alone would be nowhere near sufficient to cover the entire Jacksonville market; it could not be seen at all south of Interstate 10. Even though at least 70 percent of Jacksonville television households subscribed to cable, those that did not and could not receive WBSG-TV were at risk of losing all access to ABC network programming. The scramble to ensure the First Coast would retain access to ABC programming led ABC and Allbritton to agree to accelerate the switch from April 1 to February. To make up for WBSG's coverage shortfall in the market, Allbritton reached a deal to activate a dormant construction permit licensed to Orange Park, Florida—WYDP (channel 25)—under a local marketing agreement. The compressed timetable forced Allbritton to build an interim facility to provide network coverage to Jacksonville, particularly the southern and western portions of the market where WBSG could not be seen over the air. On February 9, 1997, channel 25 came to air as WJXX. It took over the ABC affiliation with WBSG-TV as a semi-satellite. Allbritton later bought WJXX, not WBSG-TV, outright. Allbritton's heavy investment in the combined operation suffered from substantial technical issues. Due to the rush to get WJXX on the air, it did not have a permanent transmitter facility in place for more than seven months, and cable channel placement issues in Jacksonville meant that cable viewers did not get a clear picture from the new station for most of 1997. These issues severely hindered WJXX's competitive position in the market.

WBSG continued to air southeast Georgia news at 6 and 11 p.m. from its transmitter only. After WJXX launched its Jacksonville-based news department in December 1997, the Brunswick news operation continued to operate with 7 and 11 p.m. newscasts until March 1998, when it was converted to a bureau for WJXX with 11 employees being laid off and the separate newscasts being converted into inserts.

=== Pax/Ion ownership ===
On November 15, 1999, the FCC legalized television station duopolies—the common ownership of two stations in one market. The next day, November 16, the Gannett Company, owner of Jacksonville NBC affiliate WTLV, announced it would purchase WJXX from Allbritton. The deal was initiated after Allbritton approached Gannett about a possible sale. The new duopoly rules barred cross-ownership of two of the top four television stations in the same market, a restriction that typically prevented Big Four network affiliates from coming under common ownership. However, WJXX's fifth-place finish in total-day ratings, somewhat lower than most ABC affiliates, allowed the deal to go forward. The FCC approved the purchase on March 16, 2000, and Gannett took control the next morning. While WJXX's news department was merged with WTLV's as First Coast News, WBSG-TV was not included in the sale, and Allbritton converted it to programming from the Pax network. This caused some viewers in Georgia to entirely lose ABC network service.

Paxson Communications Corporation, the owner of the Pax network, purchased WBSG-TV from Allbritton in September 2000. Until that time, the only source of Pax programming in Jacksonville had been a low-power station, WPXJ-LP, in downtown Jacksonville, which Paxson had purchased in 1997 and began broadcasting in 1998. In April 2001, Paxson and WJXT (channel 4) entered into a joint sales agreement by which WJXT sold channel 21's airtime and offered news rebroadcasts on the station. The station changed its call sign to WPXC-TV on July 17, 2001.

After canceling all of its joint sales agreements and changing its name to i: Independent Television in 2005, the network became known as Ion Television in 2007, following the 2006 name change of Paxson Communications Corporation to Ion Media Networks. The E. W. Scripps Company acquired Ion in a deal announced in 2020 and completed in 2021.

== Notable former on-air staff ==
- Jacque Reid – reporter
- Bill Shanks – sports director, 1993–1995

== Technical information ==
=== Subchannels ===
The station's signal is multiplexed:

Subchannels of WPXC-TV
| Subchannel | Res. | Short name | Programming |
|---|---|---|---|
| 21.1 | 720p | ION | Ion Television |
| 21.2 | 480i | CourtTV | Court TV |
| 21.3 | 480i | Mystery | Ion Mystery |
| 21.4 | 480i | Grit | Grit |
| 21.5 | 480i | Laff | Laff |
| 21.6 | 480i | IONPlus | Ion Plus |
| 21.7 | 480i | BUSTED | Busted |
| 21.8 | 480i | QVC | QVC |
| 21.9 | 480i | QVC2 | QVC2 |

=== Analog-to-digital conversion ===
On June 12, 2009, WPXC-TV terminated its analog signal, on UHF channel 21, as part of the federally mandated transition from analog to digital television. The station's digital signal remained on its pre-transition UHF channel 24.
