= Jeannie Blaylock =

American journalist

- Blaylock anchoring coverage of the third annual "26.2 with Donna" marathon
- Status: Married
- Occupation: Journalist
- Notable credit: Evening Anchor for WTLV/WJXX (Shannon Ogden)

Jeannie Blaylock is a weekday anchor, alongside Anthony Austin, on First Coast News at WTLV/WJXX in Jacksonville, Florida, United States. She is also the "Healthwatch" reporter. Blaylock co-anchors the weeknight 5 and 6 p.m. newscasts of First Coast News.

Blaylock graduated valedictorian from Cape Central High School in Cape Girardeau, Missouri. She holds a BA and triple major in English, communication, and art from William Jewell College in Liberty, Missouri. She graduated summa cum laude in 1982 and completed part of her undergraduate work at Oxford University in Oxford, England. She also studied at the BBC in London.

She started her career in 1982 at KTAB-TV, the CBS affiliate in Abilene, Texas. In 1985, Blaylock began working at WTLV.

She was a minor character in the 1997 film Gold Coast (based on the 1980 novel by Elmore Leonard).

== Awards and recognition ==
Blaylock has received many awards including twelve Emmys, two Edward R. Murrow Awards, and a Peabody. She earned her first Emmy for helping thousands of parents try to keep their children off drugs by showing the tricks her kids use to hide drug usage. She won the Peabody Award in 1994 for her contribution in the creation, in collaboration with Baptist Health, of "Buddy Check 12". She was the first person in Jacksonville to earn a Peabody.

== See also ==
- List of Peabody Award winners
