= WPXJ =

WPXJ may refer to:

- WPXJ-TV, a television station (channel 24, virtual 51) licensed to serve Batavia, New York, United States
- WPXJ-LP, a defunct low-power television station (channel 41) formerly licensed to serve Jacksonville, Florida, United States
