= Gionet =

Gionet is a surname. Notable people with the surname include:

- Alan Gionet, American journalist
- Anthime Joseph Gionet, better known as Baked Alaska (born 1987 or 1988), American influencer
- Edmond Gionet (1931–2019), American politician
- Samantha Leriche-Gionet (born 1985), French Canadian animator, illustrator, and comic strip author
- Simon Gionet, French Canadian film director
