= George Winterling =

American television meteorologist (1931–2023)

- Born: George Alfred Winterling; September 1, 1931; Pine Beach, New Jersey, U.S.
- Died: June 21, 2023 (aged 91); Jacksonville, Florida, U.S.
- Occupations: Meteorologist, teacher
- Notable credit: Evening weather anchor/chief meteorologist for WJXT
- Title: WJXT meteorologist emeritus
- Spouse: Virginia C. Winterling
- Children: 3

George Alfred Winterling (September 1, 1931 – June 21, 2023) was an American television meteorologist and the creator of the "heat index". Chief meteorologist for television station WJXT in Jacksonville, Florida for almost 50 years, Winterling helped develop modern forecasting.

== Education ==
Winterling was born in New Jersey, but moved with his family to Jacksonville at age 10. He graduated from Robert E. Lee High School in 1949 and joined the United States Air Force. After discovering that cadet training required two years of college, he chose meteorology and was sent to Weather Observers School at Chanute Air Force Base in Rantoul, Illinois. He was stationed for a year at Turner Air Force Base in Albany, Georgia, then attended Intermediate Meteorology School at Oklahoma A&M in Stillwater. He was posted to Shemya Air Force Base in the Aleutian Islands of Alaska where he observed storms in the Pacific Ocean.

After leaving the service in 1954, he attended Jacksonville Junior College (now Jacksonville University), transferred to Florida State University and earned a meteorology degree in 1957. He was initially employed by the United States Weather Bureau (now known as the National Weather Service) and stayed there for five years.

Hurricane Donna was a major hurricane which in 1960 made landfall at Marathon, moved into the Gulf of Mexico, came ashore north of Naples, crossed the state, and returned to the Atlantic Ocean at Daytona Beach before skirting the east coast to Canada. Over 17 days, the storm was responsible for over 350 deaths and $900 million in damages. The hurricane piqued Winterling's interest. It convinced him that "the media needed knowledgeable persons doing weathercasts in times of emergencies" such as hurricanes.

== Broadcasting ==
In 1962, Winterling approached WJXT management with a new idea: add a meteorologist to the news broadcast to present a weather forecast. The idea was accepted and he was hired for the job. Less than two years later, Winterling was the only local forecaster to warn Jacksonville residents that Hurricane Dora would make landfall on the First Coast.

Winterling had been a member of the American Meteorological Society (AMS) since 1963 and his broadcasts carried their Seal of Approval.

Before satellite pictures were available, he created and copyrighted the space-view maps to portray weather systems across the country, and began the practice of calculating rainfall probability. In 1969, Winterling was appointed to the Board of Radio and Television Weathercasting and redesigned the AMS Seal of Approval during 1973. He was employed by Jacksonville University as an adjunct professor beginning in 1975, teaching meteorology through 1994. To account for the combination of summer heat and humidity, he created the "humiture" calculation in 1978, which the National Weather Service adopted as heat index the following year.

Winterling received an outstanding service award from the AMS in 1984 for his use of animation to enable viewers to better understand weather phenomenon. He became a Certified Consulting Meteorologist after passing the AMS exam in 1989.

== Semi-retirement ==
Beginning in March 2009, the station began promoting "The Big Secret". On April 23, 2009, WJXT's general manager, Bob Ellis, revealed that Winterling was going into semi-retirement. While he would no longer appear on the daily newscasts, he would fill in when the station's other weatherpeople were on vacation and also serve as a severe weather expert during hurricanes. Winterling stated that he would have more time for community events and appearances at schools and civic organizations. He noted that in the early years, there were occasions when he needed to alert viewers to severe weather conditions, but the network's broadcast rules did not permit the interruption of programs. Television weather forecasting had advanced immeasurably from when his only tools were a rain gauge, thermometer, anemometer, and wind vane. Today, computers and satellites are the primary tools. Ellis commented, "George Winterling is as famous as it gets. He pioneered the way we do weather, he helped us understand how we can make it relevant to viewers.” May 20, 2009 was Winterling's last appearance as weather anchor on the 6:00 news show. On June 23, 2009, the Jacksonville City Council passed Resolution 2009-396-A, which honored Winterling for his tenure at WJXT.

Winterling returned to WJXT to broadcast the weather shortly after recovering from cardiac arrest for one broadcast during their morning show on November 21, 2011.

== Garden ==
Winterling was also known for his gardening skills. His interest in gardening began with his mother's victory garden during World War II. He maintained a garden at his home, and shared pictures and produce with other employees. WJXT's station manager suggested that he begin a garden at the station in 1991 and they created a weekly segment called George's Garden, which offered advice on when to plant, what to grow, watering, and fertilization. For nearly 12 years, Winterling delivered the 6:00 weather live from the garden each Thursday during the growing season.

== Personal life and death ==
Winterling and his wife Virginia were married in 1956 and had three children and several grandchildren. For their golden wedding anniversary, they traveled to Alaska to revisit the base where George was stationed in 1953. They resided in the Mandarin area of Jacksonville.

Winterling died June 21, 2023, at the age of 91.
