= WJHP-TV =

Television station in Jacksonville, Florida (1953–1957)

- Jacksonville, Florida; United States
- Channels: Analog: 36 (UHF)

Programming
- Affiliations: ABC; NBC

Ownership
- Owner: Jacksonville Journal Company

History
- First air date: December 13, 1953
- Last air date: October 25, 1957

Technical information
- ERP: 282 kW
- HAAT: 140 m (460 ft)
- Transmitter coordinates: 30°16′55″N 81°37′52″W

WJHP-TV (channel 36) was a television station in Jacksonville, Florida, United States. Owned by the Jacksonville Journal Company alongside WJHP (1320 AM) and the Jacksonville Journal newspaper, it was the city's second television station and broadcast from 1953 to 1957. The station struggled economically because it was on an ultra high frequency (UHF) channel, which meant reduced advertiser acceptance and potential audience. It left the air shortly after WFGA-TV began on very high frequency (VHF) channel 12, taking with it network programming and viability. WJHP-TV operated from studios on the Philips Highway.

== History ==
The interest of the Jacksonville Journal Company, known until 1952 as the Metropolis Company, in television had been made manifest as early as 1948. In May 1948, it applied for VHF channel 8 to go with its existing radio station holdings, WJHP-AM-FM, named for company owner John H. Perry. This application was granted by the Federal Communications Commission (FCC) on August 13, 1948.

However, the FCC's reallocation plan after the freeze removed channel 8 from Jacksonville. Instead, the Jacksonville Journal Company reapplied for UHF channel 36 on December 5, 1952. A second application was filed for the channel by WEAR in Pensacola, but a settlement agreement was reached in early June. The John H. Perry–owned station in Pensacola, WCOA, withdrew its request for channel 3 there, and WEAR in turn pulled out of the channel 36 fight in Jacksonville. This resulted in WEAR-TV being approved in Pensacola and WJHP-TV in Jacksonville.

With the construction permit awarded, work began on putting the new station on the air. In August, a subsidiary of the Jacksonville Journal Company purchased the former Peacock Club, a nightclub on Philips Highway, to be refitted as the home of its radio and television operations. The Peacock, a nightclub opened during World War II, had not performed as expected in spite of being among the "plushest" such establishments in northern Florida. WJHP-TV signed affiliation agreements with the NBC and ABC networks in November.

WJHP-TV began broadcasting a test pattern on November 30, 1953, and programming on December 13.

Over its history, ownership constantly fought for a VHF channel to be made available for their use. In 1955, the station and local educators made a proposal whereby the Duval County school system would receive the channel 36 facility for educational broadcasting if the reserved channel 7 were reclassified to permit commercial use. The Jacksonville Journal Company protested after the FCC awarded channel 12 to the Florida-Georgia Television Company in September 1956. It believed the FCC should have enacted "deintermixture"—the making of the Jacksonville market all-VHF or all-UHF—as it had in similarly situated markets such as New Orleans and Duluth, Minnesota, which had one VHF and one UHF outlet in operation and a final decision pending for a second VHF station. In the appeal, Perry Jr. indicated that from December 1953 to June 30, 1956, the station had incurred operating losses of $448,900 in addition to $561,575 in construction expenses, and NBC had become noncommittal as to continuing its affiliation with WJHP-TV; previously, NBC had told WJHP-TV that it would move to the new channel 12 whenever it was granted.

The appeals court upheld the channel 12 grant in May 1957. A second appeal to have channel 7 made commercial, or alternatively to change channel 12 to UHF channel 46, was denied. Florida-Georgia Television Company's station, WFGA-TV, began broadcasting as an NBC affiliate on September 1, 1957.

John H. Perry Jr. announced on October 15, 1957, that the station would leave the air on October 25, its problems having been exacerbated by WFGA-TV's debut. Perry believed that the only way that a third station in the market could be successful was the addition of a VHF channel to Jacksonville, and hoped that the FCC would provide relief. A country music program hosted by a young Johnny Tillotson, still attending the University of Florida at the time, moved from WJHP-TV to WFGA-TV after channel 36 folded.

Perry's desire for an additional VHF channel never came to pass, and in August 1960, the FCC deleted the WJHP-TV construction permit at the Jacksonville Journal Company's request. The channel was not used again. Rust Craft Broadcasting applied for channel 36 in 1963, but after obtaining the permit, it applied to switch to channel 17 in service of its efforts to obtain network affiliation. The FCC approved this request in August 1964, and Rust Craft put WJKS-TV on the air on February 19, 1966.
