= Jennifer Lopez (meteorologist) =

American meteorologist

Jennifer Lopez is an American on-camera meteorologist for WSB-TV in Atlanta, Georgia and The Weather Channel. She began her career in 1997 at WTLV-TV in Jacksonville, Florida, and joined The Weather Channel in 2000. She stayed there until 2008, while she started working at KXAS-TV in Dallas, Texas. She left KXAS-TV in 2012. She rejoined The Weather Channel in April 2013.

== Career ==
In September 1997, Lopez landed her first position as a weekend meteorologist for WTLV-TV in Jacksonville, Florida. She was also a weather producer and weekend meteorologist at WPTV-TV in West Palm Beach, Florida.

In May 2000, Lopez joined The Weather Channel as on-camera meteorologist. She became the co-host of the PM Edition, which was called Evening Edition at the time. In March 2002, she spoke at the 15th Annual Working Women's Survival Show, discussing her career as a meteorologist. She left the network in 2008.

In June 2008, she became the weekday morning on-camera meteorologist for KXAS-TV in Dallas, Texas after a nationwide search for a replacement for seventeen-year veteran Rebecca Miller. In 2009, NBC 5 Today, the morning news program for KXAS, and for which Lopez was the meteorologist, won a Lone Star Emmy Award. In November 2010, she participated in the Spokes for Hope charity event, where she helped build bicycles for underprivileged children. She left KXAS in March 2012.

On April 20, 2013, Lopez returned to The Weather Channel doing weather updates during taped programming and was an on-camera meteorologist on Weather Center Live.

Lopez is a member of the American Meteorological Society (AMS), where she holds the seal of approval in television.

== Personal life ==
Lopez graduated with a Bachelor of Science in telecommunications from University of Florida. Lopez's second degree was a Bachelor of Science in Meteorology from Florida State University. She and her husband, a Southwest Airlines pilot, have two daughters.
