= WCWJ =

Television station in Jacksonville, Florida

- Jacksonville, Florida; United States
- Channels: Digital: 20 (UHF); Virtual: 17
- Branding: CW17

Programming
- Affiliations: 17.1: The CW; for others, see § Subchannels

Ownership
- Owner: Graham Media Group; (Graham Media Group, Florida, Inc.)
- Sister stations: WJXT

History
- First air date: February 19, 1966
- Former call signs: WJKS-TV (1966–1997); WJWB (1997–2006)
- Former channel numbers: Analog: 17 (UHF, 1966–2009); Digital: 34 (UHF, 2002–2020)
- Former affiliations: ABC (1966–1980, 1988–1997); NBC (1980–1988); The WB (1997–2006)
- Call sign meaning: The CW Jacksonville

Technical information
- Licensing authority: FCC
- Facility ID: 29712
- ERP: 1,000 kW
- HAAT: 303.9 m (997 ft)
- Transmitter coordinates: 30°16′25″N 81°33′12″W

Links
- Public license information: Public file; LMS
- Website: www.news4jax.com/cw17

WCWJ (channel 17) is a television station in Jacksonville, Florida, United States, affiliated with The CW. It is owned by Graham Media Group alongside WJXT (channel 4), an independent station. The two stations share studios at 4 Broadcast Place on the south bank of the St. Johns River in Jacksonville; WCWJ's transmitter is located on Anders Boulevard on the south side of the city.

Built by Rust Craft Broadcasting, channel 17 began broadcasting as WJKS-TV on February 19, 1966. It was Jacksonville's ABC affiliate; previously, the city was the largest with only two commercial TV stations and had no exclusive ABC affiliate. From the outset, the station was a weak network affiliate that struggled to develop local news programming; it did not broadcast an early-evening local newscast until 1978. When ABC became the number-one network in the late 1970s, ABC moved to replace it with WTLV (channel 12), previously the NBC affiliate, setting up an affiliation switch that occurred in 1980. Media General, then primarily a newspaper publisher, acquired the station and in 1983 relaunched the news department with weekend reports and increased production values. In spite of the improvements, the station only briefly posed a ratings challenge to dominant WJXT or WTLV. The latter station suffered under its ABC affiliation and, after being acquired by Gannett, induced an affiliation switch back to NBC in 1988. Ratings for WJKS-TV slumped and remained in third place; its most-watched newscast by 1996 was the 10 p.m. news it produced for Jacksonville's Fox affiliate, WAWS.

Allbritton Communications agreed to buy WBSG-TV in Brunswick, Georgia, in February 1996 and simultaneously obtained the ABC affiliation for it, replacing WJKS-TV, in a group deal. Media General fought the change for months but gave up, shutting down the news department at the end of 1996. WJKS affiliated with The WB, and its preemption of more than half of ABC's prime time lineup prompted the affiliation switch to WBSG and WJXX to be hurried forward to February 9, 1997. Channel 17 changed its call sign to WJWB and emerged as one of The WB's strongest affiliates. When The WB and UPN merged in 2006, channel 17 became an affiliate of The CW and adopted its present WCWJ call sign. Nexstar Broadcasting Group bought the station in 2009, experimenting with several original local programs; Graham acquired WCWJ in 2017 as part of Nexstar's purchase of Media General.

== WJKS-TV ==
Jacksonville, Florida, only had two commercial television stations between 1957 and 1966: WJXT (channel 4) and WFGA-TV (channel 12, now WTLV). Briefly, the city had three stations, but WJHP-TV, an ultra high frequency (UHF) station that operated on channel 36, folded on October 25, 1957, shortly after WFGA-TV began broadcasting. Its owner, the Jacksonville Journal newspaper, cited the inability to obtain a very high frequency (VHF) channel, comparable to channels 4 or 12, for its use. By the mid-1960s, Jacksonville was the largest city with only two commercial TV stations.

=== Early years ===
On May 8, 1963, Rust Craft Broadcasting Company, a subsidiary of the Rust Craft Greeting Card Company, applied to the Federal Communications Commission (FCC) for permission to build a new TV station on channel 36. After obtaining the permit on September 11, 1963, it applied to switch to channel 17 in service of its efforts to obtain network affiliation, a request the FCC approved; previously, an applicant seeking the addition of VHF channel 10 to Jacksonville had told the FCC that ABC was unwilling to affiliate with a UHF station because not enough sets were converted to receive UHF in the area. A final revision to the technical plans was approved by the commission in June 1965, and WJKS-TV began broadcasting on February 19, 1966, with an episode of Porky Pig. WJKS-TV was affiliated with ABC, supplanting WJXT and WFGA-TV, which had previously split carriage of the network's programming. In 1969, the station built a new 1,050-foot (320 m) tower, the tallest structure in North Florida at that time.

When WJKS-TV signed on the air, it had no local programming. The station was airing limited local news with equally limited resources. In 1977, its 11 p.m. news had a measly 5% audience share, and one man—Mark Aldren—served as news director, anchor, and producer of the newscast. He was replaced by veteran newsman and former WFGA-TV employee Bert Roselle in January 1978; that August, the station debuted a feature-oriented 5:30 p.m. early newscast, designed to avoid competition with WJXT and WTLV at 6 p.m.

In June 1977, the Ziff Corporation, parent of magazine publisher Ziff-Davis, made a bid for Rust Craft, primarily seeking its six television stations. Ziff-Davis had previously hired I. Martin Pompadur, a former ABC executive, as part of the company's plan to acquire television stations. The Rust Craft board approved the sale that September for a total price of approximately $69 million, but booming prices for broadcast properties and an objection by two Rust Craft directors and shareholders, seeking more money, caused the deal to be delayed and its price to continue to balloon. The original bid had been $25 a share; the board approved at $26.50 a share. By October 1978, Ziff was offering $33.50 per share. The final sales price of $33.75 a share, or $89 million in total, was approved in February 1979; the transaction already had federal approval, so the new owners were able to take over the next month. After the ownership change, WJKS-TV increased its transmitter effective radiated power to 4.5 million watts in 1980.

=== Switch to NBC and Media General purchase ===
Beginning in 1977, speculation emerged that WTLV, Jacksonville's NBC affiliate, might switch its network affiliation from NBC to ABC. At the time, ABC had surpassed NBC in the national ratings and was seeking affiliate upgrades nationwide. Even though ABC had multiple shows at the top of the national ratings, Jacksonville did not reflect these viewing patterns; locally, ABC had none of the top 25 shows, with CBS and WJXT taking 23 of the top 25 slots. The rumors were further bolstered by remarks made by ABC network president Jim Duffy stating that he had talked with other Jacksonville stations. WTLV signed a two-year renewal with NBC for 1978 through 1980, pinning its hopes on new NBC chairman Fred Silverman, but less than a year after signing the renewal, on May 3, 1979, WTLV announced it would switch to ABC in 1980. While NBC's affiliation agreement did not expire until September 1, the switch was moved forward to March 31, 1980. This was done to allow NBC to air the 1980 Summer Olympics on channel 17, which was projected to benefit the new affiliate.

Ziff decided in 1981 to put the stations on the market, having already sold off the Rust Craft radio stations and its greeting card businesses, and focus on its publishing businesses. Though it attempted to sell all six stations as a package, WJKS-TV was the first to be sold. Media General, a Tampa-based publishing company, agreed to acquire channel 17 for $18 million in a deal announced November 24, 1981. At the time, Media General's only broadcasting holdings were WFLA radio and television in Tampa. While the WJKS purchase was pending, Media General sold off the WFLA radio stations and acquired WCBD in Charleston, South Carolina.

Media General promised major changes in the WJKS-TV news department, including the introduction of weekend news and the acquisition of microwave transmission capabilities for live reports in newscasts. The station introduced new anchors on its weeknight evening newscast at the end of April and its first weekend news programs a week later, as well as a new set and presentation elements as part of a $225,000 investment. In 1985, the station debuted a helicopter, branded "Sky 17", which independent station WAWS lampooned in a commercial depicting it being blown out of the sky by the Starship Enterprise. That year marked a high point for news ratings, which challenged WTLV for second place.

During this period, WJKS-TV was almost sold again. Media General announced its sale to New Jersey–based Gateway Communications, which owned stations and a newspaper in the Northeast, for $25 million in November 1984. However, Gateway became concerned that the station's position could be compromised. Days after the sale was announced, in Tampa, a channel swap agreement was revealed between WTOG-TV, a commercial UHF station like WJKS, and WEDU, the area's public TV station. Like in Tampa, Jacksonville's public TV station, WJCT (channel 7), operated on a VHF channel. Gateway fretted that one of Jacksonville's two other UHF stations, WAWS (channel 30) or WNFT (channel 47), could reach a deal with WJCT, move to channel 7, and take the NBC affiliation from WJKS on account of its stronger signal and lower channel number. As a result, no final purchase agreement was ever signed, nor was the transaction put to the FCC.

Not long after the 1980 switch, the ratings fortunes of NBC and ABC reversed. WTLV came to regret the switch. By 1986, the president of Harte-Hanks's broadcasting division, Bill Moll, estimated that WTLV could improve its revenues by 12 percent if it returned to NBC, and the company had been in open dialogue with NBC since 1981. Moll admitted that switching to ABC "was a short-term help, and it's not helping us now". In 1985, NBC pitched an affiliation switch to WTLV, with station management and ownership opting to remain with ABC; in 1986, NBC was also linked to talks with WJXT. By May 1987, WJKS had passed WTLV in the local total-day ratings, but speculation in national publications such as Electronic Media continued to link NBC to an affiliation switch in Jacksonville as it sought to improve its affiliate lineup nationwide. WTLV's general manager, Linda Rios Brook, later commented that the market had "never fully accepted" the 1980 affiliation switch.

=== Return to ABC ===
Gannett agreed to buy WTLV from Harte-Hanks in December 1987; the purchase reignited speculation about an affiliation change. The transaction was completed in February 1988; within two weeks of taking control, on February 17, Gannett announced that WTLV would return to NBC, replacing WJKS-TV and undoing the 1980 swap. The stations made the switch on April 3; the switch being set so soon was speculated to be a move by Media General to hinder NBC's position. After the switch, WTLV's news and non-news ratings saw immediate improvements from the replacement of low-rated ABC with higher-rated NBC. Meanwhile, Newswatch 17 expanded to 6:30 a.m. and noon newscasts in June 1988, and the newscasts were retitled 17 News that September. The morning and noon news expansion lasted less than a year; the programs were canceled in April 1989 amid low ratings against competition from WJXT and WTLV, with as many as 18 employees laid off and morning anchor Joyce Morgan and meteorologist John Gaughan assigned to the weeknight newscasts instead. In 1990, the station rebranded its news department as 17 First Coast News, but it was still well behind the pace in ratings and resources. While WJXT and WTLV each had news staffs of 50 or more people, WJKS employed 24 in news, opting to counterprogram the now-hour-long early-evening newscasts on those stations with a half-hour of hard news aired at 6 p.m.

On October 7, 1991, WJKS began producing a 10 p.m. newscast for WAWS, which had become a Fox affiliate. Fox 30 First Coast News at 10 was the first full-length prime-time newscast in the Jacksonville market and featured a dedicated producer, reporter, and videographer. WAWS hoped to attract advertisers that preferred newscasts, while WJKS hoped to use the 10 p.m. news as a platform to attract viewers to its other news offerings, such as the 11 p.m. newscast that only attracted 7% of the audience. The WAWS newscast came to draw more viewers than WJKS's 11 p.m. news, twice as many by May 1996; viewership remained flat for channel 17's own newscasts, which station officials and their competitors agreed was a result of viewers' ingrained habits in news and network programming.

=== Loss of ABC affiliation ===
On February 16, 1996, Allbritton Communications simultaneously announced an agreement to purchase WBSG-TV (channel 21) in Brunswick, Georgia, in the northern reaches of the Jacksonville media market, and a deal with ABC to make WBSG-TV the network's new affiliate for Jacksonville, replacing WJKS-TV effective January 1, 1997. The Allbritton–ABC pact moved ABC's affiliation to Allbritton stations in four markets, affecting not only WJKS-TV but Media General sister WCBD in Charleston, South Carolina. The news caught channel 17 management completely off guard and left the station with few options. Unlike in 1980 or 1988, no other major network was available. The biggest missing affiliation in the market was the much smaller WB Television Network, which had started in 1995; the network had no affiliate in Jacksonville proper. To make the move possible and improve its signal coverage in Jacksonville, WBSG-TV filed to move its tower south to a site near Kingsland, Georgia. In March, WJKS-TV filed to seek a tower in the same site and force the matter into hearing, delaying the proposed Kingsland tower for WBSG-TV and even threatening Allbritton's purchase of channel 21.

WJKS conceded defeat on August 6, 1996, after the FCC permitted WBSG-TV to double the height of its existing tower at Hickox, Georgia, to 2,000 feet (610 m) in lieu of a move to Kingsland. At that time, news employees were told the news operation would continue at least through December, because WJKS had to maintain a news department to meet its contractual obligations to WAWS. At this time, employees began to depart, with the sports director and lead female anchor announcing their departures within two months of the news. WJKS-TV's final local newscast aired December 29, 1996.

The end of the WJKS-TV news department spurred WAWS to launch its own on December 30, 1996, to fill the void created by the end of Fox 30 First Coast News at 10. After talks with WJKS about renting its existing facilities broke down when Media General opted to retain the equipment for use in other cities, WAWS hired several WJKS-TV news employees as part of its operation.

=== Notable on-air staff ===
- Doug McKelway – anchor, 1988–1989
- Sam Champion – weekend meteorologist, 1986–1987

== WJWB: From ABC to The WB ==
After ceasing to fight the loss of ABC affiliation, Media General began remaking channel 17. When the 1996–97 television season began, WJKS-TV preempted Dangerous Minds on Monday nights and the Saturday night movie. It then announced an affiliation with The WB to take effect April 1, 1997, with the possibility that some WB programs could appear sooner.

In January 1997, with little advance warning, WJKS started more extensive preemptions of ABC programs as part of its transition to The WB. Of 22 prime time hours offered by ABC, WJKS refused to clear 12 1/2 hours as well as any new programs introduced by ABC, including the entirety of ABC's Sunday and Thursday night lineups. The schedule change was so abrupt that it came after The Florida Times-Union published its weekly television listings; viewers were told to consult the paper's daily program grids instead. Channel 17 continued to broadcast the network's five most popular shows, as well as ABC's network news and soap operas. The uncleared programs were replaced with syndicated shows and programming from The WB.

This decision prompted ABC and Allbritton to take more immediate action. WBSG-TV alone would be insufficient to cover the entire Jacksonville market. Even though at least 70 percent of the market had access to cable, this would have left those without cable at risk of losing access to ABC programming. To make up for channel 21's shortfalls, Albritton reached a deal to activate a languishing construction permit licensed to Orange Park, Florida—WYDP (channel 25)—under a local marketing agreement. The compressed timetable forced Allbritton to build an interim facility to provide network coverage to Jacksonville, particularly the southern and western portions of the market where WBSG could not be seen at all. On February 9, 1997, channel 25 came to air as WJXX. It took over the ABC affiliation, with WBSG-TV as a semi-satellite. Days later, reflecting its new full-time WB affiliation, WJKS-TV became WJWB.

With WB programming instead of ABC, as well as a conversion to metered ratings, WJWB's ratings increased. In the May 1999 sweeps period, WJWB placed third in total-day ratings, ahead of Fox affiliate WAWS and ABC affiliate WJXX. In November 2001, it was the number-one WB affiliate in prime time nationwide; when it repeated this feat in November 2003 and February 2004, the network honored WJWB with its Froggy award. However, toward the end of the network's life, prime time ratings slipped to sixth.

WJWB began providing a digital signal on January 29, 2002, on channel 34. It ceased analog service on channel 17 on June 11, 2009, ahead of the June 12 digital television transition date. The station's digital signal remained on channel 34 until it was relocated to channel 20 on January 17, 2020, as a result of the 2016 United States wireless spectrum auction.

== WCWJ ==
The WB and its longtime rival, UPN, announced in January 2006 that they would merge into a new network, The CW. While UPN was not airing on a full-time affiliate—when WJXT became an independent station in 2002, new CBS affiliate WTEV dropped UPN and moved it to late-night hours on WAWS—the merged network had the option of affiliating with WJXT in lieu of WJWB. However, WJXT was not interested, and WJWB agreed to affiliate with The CW on March 28, 2006. Ahead of the network's September launch, WJWB changed call signs to WCWJ on May 26.

Media General put WCWJ and four other stations in mid-sized Southeastern markets up for sale in October 2007. It was the last of the five stations to find a buyer: Nexstar Broadcasting Group. The station was a rarity for Nexstar in that it did not have local news programming. Under Nexstar, the station experimented with several new local programs, including a local music program, YourJax Music; the locally produced sitcom In the Pits; Local Haunts, a paranormal activity show; and YourJax Roller Girls, featuring local roller derby. It also aired local sports including Jacksonville Sharks arena football, Jacksonville Suns baseball, and Jacksonville Armada soccer.

=== Duopoly with WJXT ===
Nexstar acquired Media General in 2016. To meet local and national ownership caps, it sold five stations, including WCWJ. It and WSLS-TV in Roanoke, Virginia, were sold to Graham Media Group—owner of WJXT—for $120 million. The deal closed in January 2017. Though WJXT had a large local news operation, Graham opted against bringing news to WCWJ to preserve the two stations' identities.

== Local programming ==
The station airs two unduplicated local programs: iKnowJax, a weekly entertainment and nightlife review hosted by Joe Talentino, and Inside Jacksonville, a monthly newsmagazine hosted by students at the University of North Florida. The station also rebroadcasts WJXT's 11 p.m. newscast and reairs of the station's This Week in Jacksonville and In the Game shows.

== Subchannels ==
WCWJ's transmitter facility is located on Anders Boulevard on the south side of Jacksonville. The station's signal is multiplexed:

Subchannels of WCWJ
Subchannel	Res.	Short name	Programming
17.1	720p	WCWJ-HD	The CW
17.2	720p	BOUNCE	Bounce TV
17.3	480i	Movies	Movies!
17.4	480i	GET TV	Great
4.1	720p	WJXT-HD	WJXT (Independent)
4.3	480i	START	Start TV (WJXT)

Broadcast on behalf of another station
