= WTLV =

Television station in Jacksonville, Florida

- Jacksonville, Florida; United States
- Channels: Digital: 13 (VHF), to move to 33 (UHF); Virtual: 12
- Branding: WTLV NBC 12; First Coast News

Programming
- Affiliations: 12.1: NBC; for others, see § Subchannels

Ownership
- Owner: Tegna Inc., a subsidiary of Nexstar Media Group; (Multimedia Holdings Corporation)
- Sister stations: WJXX

History
- First air date: September 1, 1957
- Former call signs: WFGA-TV (1957–1971)
- Former channel numbers: Analog: 12 (VHF, 1957–2009)
- Former affiliations: NBC (1957–1980); ABC (secondary 1957–1966, primary 1980–1988)
- Call sign meaning: "Television"

Technical information
- Licensing authority: FCC
- Facility ID: 65046
- ERP: 53.3 kW; 1,000 kW (application)
- HAAT: 290.7 m (954 ft); 290.4 m (953 ft) (application)
- Transmitter coordinates: 30°16′25″N 81°33′12″W

Links
- Public license information: Public file; LMS
- Website: www.firstcoastnews.com

WTLV (channel 12) is a television station in Jacksonville, Florida, United States, affiliated with NBC. It is owned by the Tegna subsidiary of Nexstar Media Group alongside Orange Park–licensed ABC affiliate WJXX (channel 25), a combination known as First Coast News. The two stations share studios on Adams Street in downtown Jacksonville; WTLV's transmitter is located on Anders Boulevard on the city's Southside.

Channel 12 in Jacksonville began broadcasting on September 1, 1957, as WFGA-TV. It was an NBC affiliate owned by the Florida-Georgia Television Company and, beginning shortly after its launch, one of two stations in the city. WFGA-TV spent most of its first 15 years on air embroiled in legal conflict stemming from an influence scandal involving a Federal Communications Commission (FCC) commissioner. The case was ultimately resolved in 1969 by an operating consortium comprising Florida-Georgia and three groups also seeking channel 12, which was enshrined as its regular ownership in 1971. Shortly after, the station changed its call sign to WTLV.

Harte-Hanks Newspapers acquired WTLV in 1975. In 1980, the station switched affiliations from NBC to ABC at a time when ABC was number-one nationally and NBC was stuck in third. ABC's ratings lead did not last, and by the middle of the decade, being an ABC affiliate was weighing on WTLV. In 1988, Gannett bought WTLV from Harte-Hanks and nearly immediately switched its affiliation back to NBC. Over the course of the 1990s, the station became more competitive and posed the most serious challenge yet to the traditional news ratings leader in Jacksonville, WJXT (channel 4).

In 1999, as the FCC legalized duopolies, Gannett agreed to buy WJXX from Allbritton Communications. WJXX—which had been established as the city's new ABC affiliate in 1997—had been such a ratings underperformer that the combination of the two major network affiliates was permissible. Upon taking control in March 2000, WJXX's operation was combined with WTLV's, with mostly WTLV personnel and in WTLV's studios, as First Coast News. The combined news operation remained the second-rated outlet in the market before slipping to third.

== History ==
=== Construction ===
In April 1952, the Federal Communications Commission (FCC) lifted a freeze on new TV station grants, opening the door to new TV stations in Jacksonville. Days after the freeze was lifted, the Florida-Georgia Television Company announced its intention to seek the channel. One of its stockholders was Harold Cohn, who owned Jacksonville radio station WRHC. His interest in television began in 1951, when a man told him he stopped listening to Cohn's radio station because he was watching more TV. That man was Alexander Brest, another stakeholder in the firm. Also represented was Miami movie theater operator Wometco Enterprises and its chairman, Mitchell Wolfson.

Florida-Georgia and two other groups sought channel 12: the city of Jacksonville, a broadcaster by its ownership of radio station WJAX, and the Jacksonville Broadcasting Company, owner of WPDQ (600 AM). These groups had each obtained pre-freeze construction permits they had not acted on. WJAX had previously held a permit for channel 2, and the FCC's final 1950 deletion of the permit was upheld in court in May 1951; WPDQ-TV's permit had been deleted in the same initial action. The FCC designated the three applications for hearing in January 1954, and FCC hearing examiner Charles J. Frederick delivered the initial decision in April 1955. It called for granting channel 12 to Jacksonville Broadcasting based on its superior integration of ownership and management—in other words, the participation of station owners in station operations.

The losing parties to the initial decision—Florida-Georgia and the city of Jacksonville—appealed the initial decision to the commission, which overturned it on August 31, 1956. In a 4–2 vote, the commission granted channel 12 to the Florida-Georgia Television Company. The two dissenters agreed with the original 1955 decision favoring WPDQ. Construction on channel 12's studios, on Adams Street near the Gator Bowl, began in January 1957, even as Jacksonville Broadcasting and the city of Jacksonville contested the award. On May 29, 1957, the appeals court upheld the award to Florida-Georgia and rejected a plea for denial by WJHP-TV (channel 36), an ultra high frequency (UHF) station that feared being driven out of business. By this time, the Adams Street studios were nearly complete, and foundations had been poured for the station's tower.

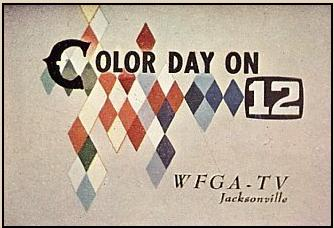
Early color television ID for WFGA-TV

WFGA-TV broadcast its first test pattern on August 14, 1957, with regular programming following on September 1. It was affiliated from the start with NBC. Management boasted that WFGA-TV was the first station designed and built with color telecasting in mind; the station had color as well as black and white studio cameras. WJHP-TV ceased telecasting on October 25, 1957, its problems having been exacerbated by WFGA-TV's debut; a country music program hosted by a young Johnny Tillotson, still attending the University of Florida at the time, moved from WJHP-TV to WFGA-TV after channel 36 folded. After it closed, ABC programming was split by WFGA-TV and Jacksonville's other commercial station, WMBR-TV/WJXT (channel 4). ABC represented about 25 percent of the network programming aired on channel 12. Jacksonville would not have a full-time ABC affiliate—or a third commercial station—again until WJKS-TV began on channel 17 in February 1966.

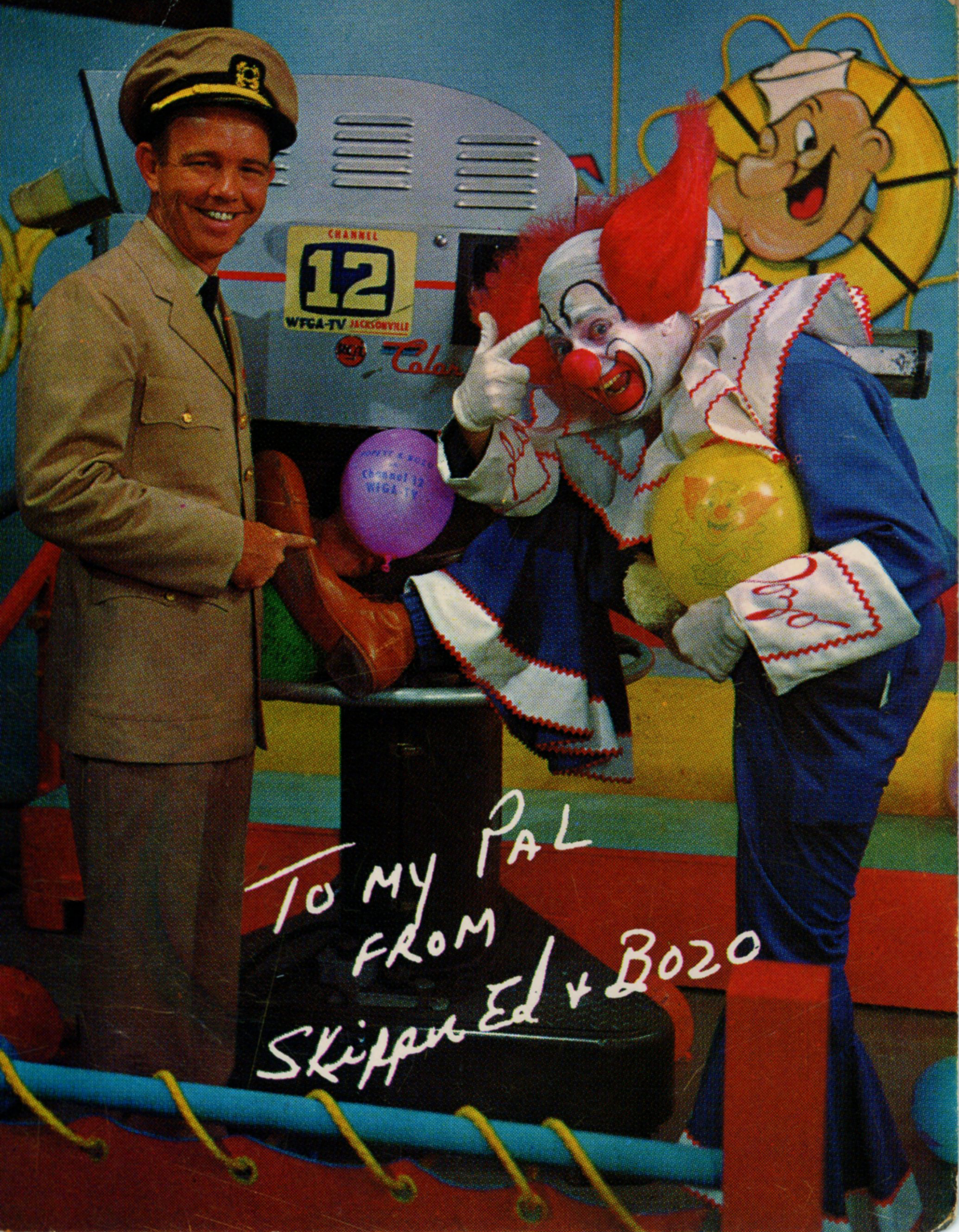
"Skipper Ed" and Bozo the Clown were among the children's shows on WFGA-TV

In addition to Tillotson, WFGA-TV brought a variety of local programs to Jacksonville screens in its early years. It produced the local version of children's television franchise Romper Room for 14 years from 1956 to 1970, with local schoolteacher Vivian Huff as "Miss Penny". For twelve years, from 1961 to 1973, "Skipper Ed" McCullers hosted cartoons; after the show ended, McCullers remained at channel 12 as public affairs director until 1988. Viewers across the country saw coverage of space launches at Cape Canaveral through WFGA-TV's cameras and facilities. Not only did WFGA-TV supply footage to NBC, but it often provided the press pool feed for other networks.

=== Ex parte influence scandal and assignment to Channel 12 of Jacksonville ===
As WFGA-TV was getting on the air, a scandal involving the FCC's decisions in several contested television station cases exploded into view. In January 1958, syndicated columnist Drew Pearson published a column alleging that FCC commissioner Richard Mack, a Florida native, had been influenced to switch the approval of channel 10 in Miami to a company affiliated with National Airlines. The resulting congressional investigation uncovered other cases of ex parte communications between attorneys and FCC commissioners on matters before the commission. Among the proceedings the committee investigated was that of channel 12 in Jacksonville. In April 1962, an FCC hearing examiner recommended the grant be voided because of Mack's involvement in the vote and found the other two applicants unqualified; the FCC overturned the initial decision in September 1963 and reaffirmed its original 1956 grant to Florida-Georgia, finding no improprieties on its behalf. It disqualified Jacksonville Broadcasting for its own ex parte contacts, while the city of Jacksonville application was denied as inferior to Florida-Georgia and not—as earlier proposed—for contacts made by one city commissioner.

In May 1965, a three-judge appeals court panel reversed most of the 1963 FCC ruling and concurred with the original April 1962 denial. It ordered the commission to open channel 12 to new applicants, as the city of Jacksonville had withdrawn from the proceeding and the judges upheld the disqualification of Jacksonville Broadcasting. Florida-Georgia survived the threat of disqualification on a 2–1 vote; in a partial dissent, Warren E. Burger said that both or neither of Jacksonville Broadcasting and Florida-Georgia should have been disqualified. The court rejected the two applicants' requests for rehearing, affirming the decision. In compliance with the court ruling, the FCC formally vacated the grants of WFGA-TV and WFTV in Orlando, which had a very similar ex parte–rooted case, in November 1965, though it allowed WFGA-TV to telecast in the interim.

With the channel 12 proceeding opened to all comers, the FCC began receiving bids from new applicants. The Community First Corporation, a consortium of local businessmen, had been formed in June 1960 to seek a proposed channel 10 drop-in, but that never materialized; five years later, it filed for channel 12. Florida Gateway Television was headed by former Florida governor C. Farris Bryant. New Horizons Telecasting was primarily owned by Frank Pellegrin, who had radio station interests in Tennessee and New Hampshire. These three competitors and Florida-Georgia were placed into comparative hearing status on July 7, 1967.

In September 1968, the Court of Appeals ordered the FCC to consider the interim operating authority requests from competing applicants for WFGA-TV and WFTV. These applications sought for groups to run the stations until a final decision was made on the underlying license. For WFGA-TV, proposals were received from Jacksonville University, St. John's Cathedral, and educational TV station WJCT. However, the appeals court rejected interim operators that were not seeking to run the stations on a full-time basis. With the shutdown of channel 12 the only other option, in January 1969, the FCC authorized all four pending applicants to join forces in an interim operator for WFGA-TV. Florida-Georgia agreed to lease the WFGA-TV facilities to the operator, and the existing staff was maintained except for the station president.

The hearing initially continued after the interim operation came into place. In 1970, the parties reached a settlement to assign the license to Channel 12 of Jacksonville, a permanent consortium of the four applicants and their stockholders. Channel 12 of Jacksonville consisted of 74 different stockholders, with the largest share being held by Wometco at 11 percent. The FCC approved in June 1971, and the new arrangement came into force on July 23. As part of a campaign to create a new image for the station, WFGA-TV changed its call sign to WTLV (for "television") on December 13, 1971. By 1974, Channel 12 of Jacksonville had received four offers for the station. One of the four, Harte-Hanks Newspapers of San Antonio, Texas, presented a buyout offer to the firm's stockholders. On September 30, Harte-Hanks announced it had secured a controlling 51-percent interest in Channel 12 of Jacksonville and would seek to purchase the remainder; the $10.5 million deal received FCC approval in March 1975.

=== 1980 affiliation switch to ABC ===
Beginning in 1977, speculation emerged that WTLV might switch its network affiliation from NBC to ABC. At the time, ABC had surpassed NBC in the national ratings and was seeking affiliate upgrades nationwide, but it was stuck in Jacksonville on WJKS-TV, a station that did not even air an early-evening newscast. The comments were further bolstered by remarks made by ABC network president Jim Duffy stating that he had talked with other Jacksonville stations. WTLV signed a two-year renewal with NBC for 1978 through 1980, pinning its hopes on new NBC chairman Fred Silverman, but less than a year after signing the renewal, on May 3, 1979, WTLV announced it would switch to ABC in 1980. While NBC's affiliation agreement did not expire until September 1, the switch was moved forward to March 31, 1980. This was done to allow NBC to air the 1980 Summer Olympics on channel 17, which was projected to benefit the new affiliate. WTLV began broadcasting stereo sound in 1984 and was the first Jacksonville station to do so. The next year, WJXT and WTLV jointly constructed a 1,000-foot-tall (305 m) tower along Anders Boulevard on Jacksonville's Southside, with WTLV switching to the new tower that December.

Not long after the 1980 switch, the ratings fortunes of NBC and ABC reversed. Harte-Hanks and NBC in 1981 began an open dialogue about WTLV switching back to NBC. In 1986, Bill Moll, the president of Harte-Hanks's broadcasting division, estimated that WTLV could improve its revenues by 12 percent if it returned to NBC. Moll admitted that switching to ABC "was a short-term help, and it's not helping us now". Harte-Hanks attempted to improve the station by dispatching management from WFMY-TV in Greensboro, North Carolina, a top-rated CBS affiliate, to WTLV. In 1985, NBC pitched an affiliation switch to WTLV, with station management and ownership opting to remain with ABC; in 1986, NBC was also linked to talks with WJXT. By May 1987, WTLV was a distant third in the local ratings. That year, ABC moved to reduce the network compensation it paid WTLV and 15 other affiliates that it deemed were being overpaid for their performance, many of whom had been lured to the network by high rates; channel 12 saw a 20- to 25-percent cut.

[I] marveled at how deep and wide the problems were. It has taken a year to get most of them fixed.

— Linda Rios Brook, general manager, WTLV, on the situation she encountered upon becoming general manager in 1986

In 1986, Harte-Hanks named Linda Rios Brook the general manager of WTLV. Rios Brook made aggressive syndicated program purchases to bolster a non-network inventory that was poorly performing in the ratings, especially in the afternoons; these included purchasing the rights to Jeopardy! and Wheel of Fortune from WJXT at prices that reportedly set market records. In October 1987, having been saddled with $700 million in debt from a 1984 leveraged buyout, Harte-Hanks sought to reduce its load by putting a number of its divisions up for sale, including three newspapers, seven cable systems, and WTLV and WFMY-TV. That December, Gannett agreed to buy the two TV stations for $155 million. The transaction was completed in February 1988.

=== 1988 return to NBC ===
The Gannett purchase reignited speculation about an affiliate change. On February 17, 1988, within two weeks of taking control, Gannett announced that WTLV would return to NBC, replacing WJKS-TV and undoing the 1980 swap. Rios Brook told The Florida Times-Union that the market had "never accepted" the 1980 switch, which instead favored WJKS. At the time, NBC was number-one and seeking to improve its affiliate lineup much as ABC had years prior. The stations made the switch on April 3; the switch so soon was speculated to be a move by WJKS owner Media General to hinder NBC's position. After the switch, WTLV's news and non-news ratings saw immediate improvements from the replacement of low-rated ABC with higher-rated NBC.

WTLV was the first local television rights partner for the expansion Jacksonville Jaguars of the NFL and spent six seasons, from 1995 through 2000, airing the team's preseason games and coaches' shows. During this time, WTLV sports director Dan Hicken served as the play-by-play announcer for the preseason telecasts and hosted a regular Monday night sports discussion show, Monday Night Live. The latter was co-hosted by several former players during its run on the air, including Tony Boselli, John Jurkovic, and Jeff Lageman. WTLV lost the rights to WJXT before the 2001 season.

=== Duopoly with WJXX ===
On November 15, 1999, the FCC legalized television station duopolies—the common ownership of two stations in one market. The next day, Gannett announced it would purchase WJXX, which had been Jacksonville's ABC affiliate since February 1997, from Allbritton Communications. The deal was initiated after Allbritton approached Gannett about a possible sale. The new duopoly rules barred cross-ownership of two of the top four television stations in the same market, a restriction that typically prevented Big Four network affiliates from coming under common ownership. However, WJXX's fifth-place finish in total-day ratings allowed the deal. WJXX had struggled in two and a half years of existence and just under two years of news production, owing to a rushed launch that forced Allbritton to divert its attention to the installation of temporary facilities and impeded the delivery of a quality signal. Furthermore, WJXX suffered from ABC's continued underperformance in the Jacksonville market; Charlie Patton, television editor for The Florida Times-Union, later noted that "Jacksonville never acquired the ABC habit". Channel 25's news ratings, despite a product considered superior to that WJKS had produced as an ABC affiliate, lagged WJXT and WTLV; one bright spot was the market's only local newscast at 7 p.m. It became apparent that the combination of WTLV and WJXX would rely heavily on the former's facility and personnel, causing WJXX staffers to begin to depart.

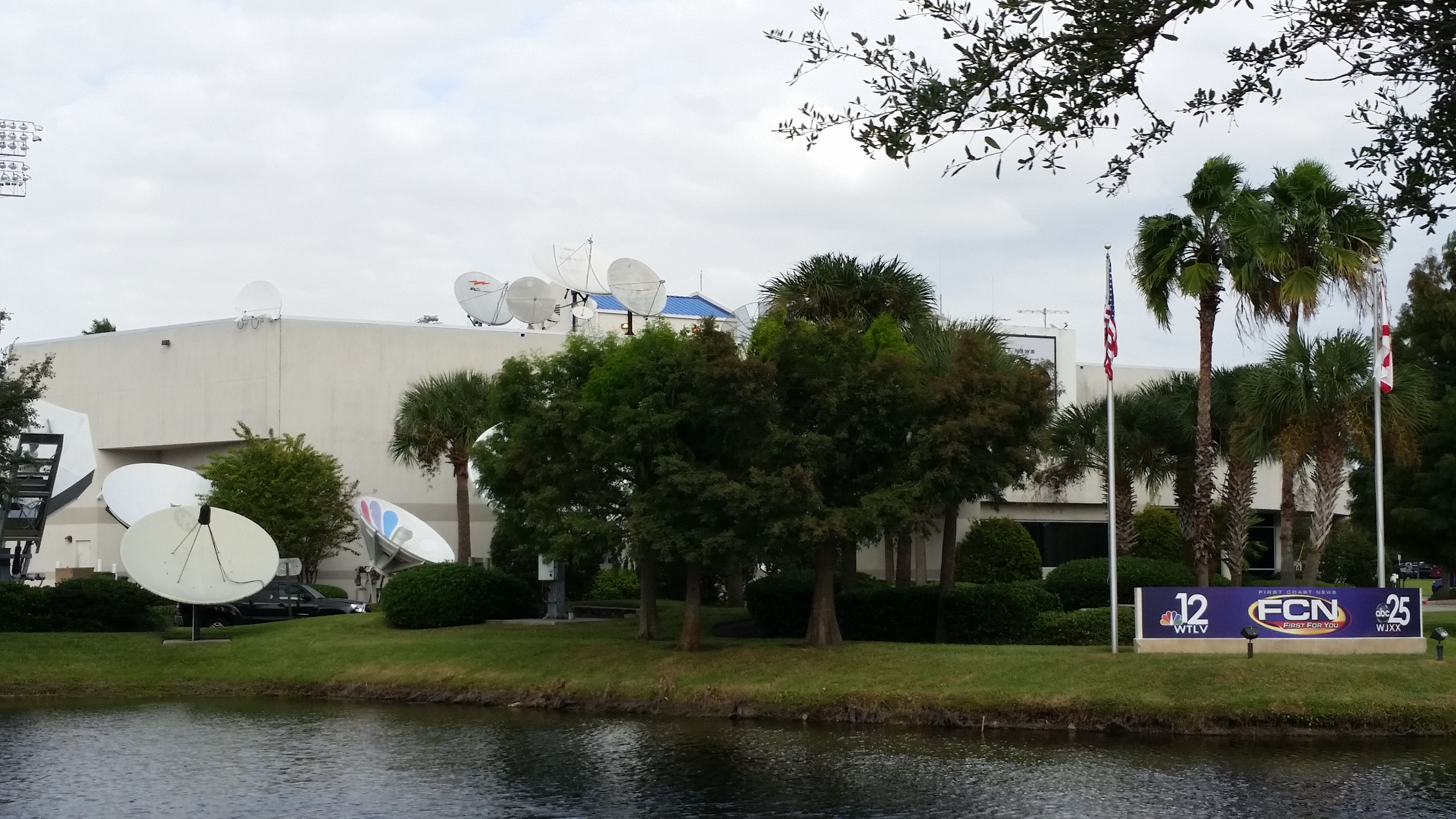
The WTLV–WJXX studios on Adams Street in Jacksonville

The FCC approved the purchase on March 16, 2000. Gannett took control the next morning, and about 36 WJXX employees—including 13 in news—joined the new combined WTLV-based operation, which immediately began simulcasting newscasts on both stations before relaunching on April 27 under the umbrella brand of First Coast News. Newscasts continued to be broadcast at the same time on each station, including the WJXX 7 p.m. newscast. On June 29, 2015, the Gannett Company split in two, with one side specializing in print media and the other side specializing in broadcast and digital media. WTLV and WJXX were retained by the latter company, named Tegna. WTLV was fined $55,000 by the FCC in 2017 for airing Jacksonville Jaguars promos that included the Emergency Alert System tones.

Nexstar Media Group acquired Tegna in a deal announced in August 2025 and completed on March 19, 2026.

== News operation ==
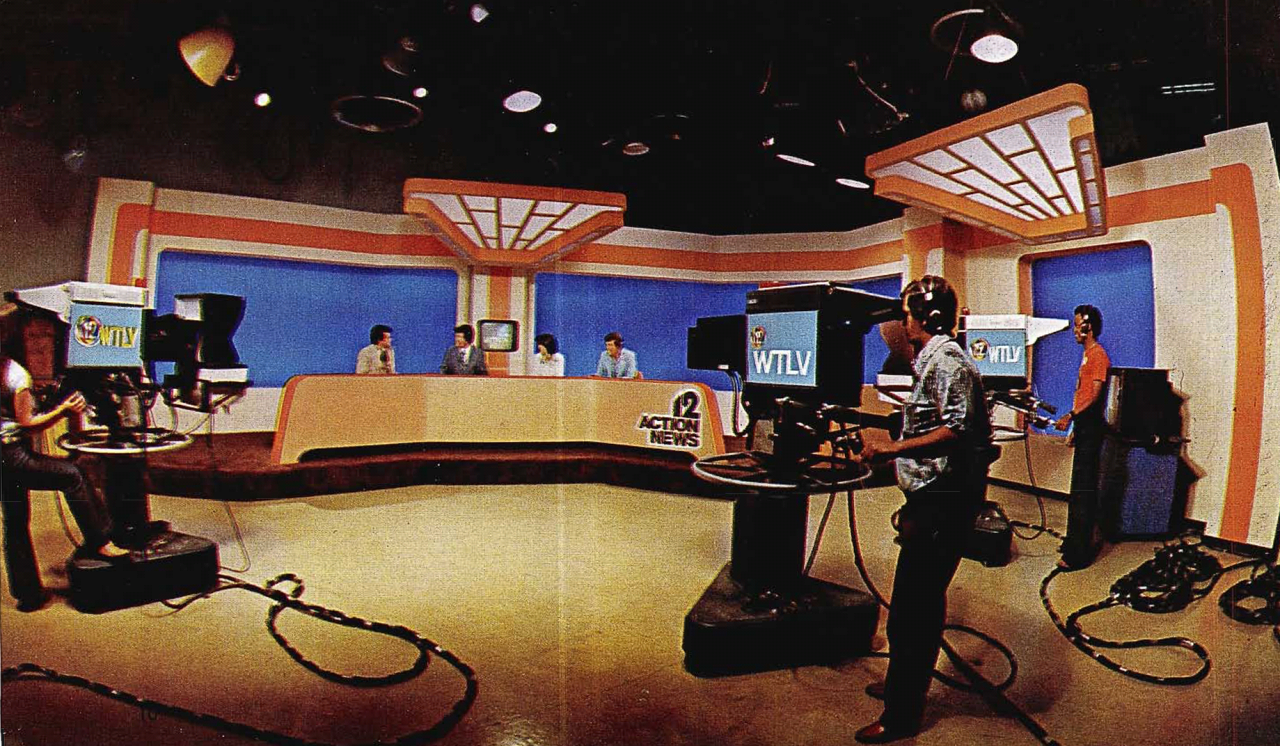
The news set of WTLV as it looked in the 1970s

When WFGA-TV launched, the station's first news director was Harold Baker, who had served in the same position at WSM radio and television in Nashville, Tennessee. Baker would anchor the station's 6 p.m. news for 17 years and direct the nascent channel 12 newsroom for 19 years in total, winning the station major national journalism awards. WTLV was Jacksonville's consistent second-place news station, finishing behind WJXT in the ratings, excluding a short period in the early 1960s under Baker when channel 12 surpassed WJXT and in 1975 when WTLV tied it in early evening news. Efforts to close the gap intensified after its 1988 acquisition by Gannett.

In 1973, the WTLV newscasts were retitled Action News. The station spent most of the 1970s and early 1980s continually revamping its news product to compete with WJXT, with regular changes in staff and format. WTLV launched the city's first morning newscast, Good Morning Jacksonville, in March 1982; conceived to complement ABC's Good Morning America, it offered news, features, and weather reports. Shortly before the program debuted, the station hired a second meteorologist, Tim Deegan. He stayed with the station and moved to evenings in 1986, where he spent 36 years appearing on the late news and continued to provide the weather in First Coast News's early-evening newscasts, until his retirement on May 30, 2025.

After years of stagnating ratings and a short-lived ratings surge from WJKS, WTLV relaunched its local newscasts in January 1986 with a new title, The News on 12, and new anchors, Lee Webb and Marcia Ladendorff. The changes were the latest for a station that already had a "revolving door" reputation with high turnover in anchors. On June 2, 1986, WTLV and WAPE-FM began jointly leasing a helicopter for traffic reports. Two weeks later, the helicopter was in the middle of a live report when it crashed near the downtown area, killing the pilot and reporter Julie Silvers and injuring a cameraman; the report reached an estimated tens of thousands of Good Morning Jacksonville viewers and radio listeners. The National Transportation Safety Board determined that a fatigued drive shaft in the helicopter's tail rotor broke, causing it to spin out of control and crash.

After Rios Brook became general manager, the station began a deeper reconstruction; with Gannett's acquisition, the situation of channel 12 was likened to KARE in Minneapolis, a longtime news underperformer that had become competitive after Gannett purchased the station and relaunched its news product. In the years following the switch back to NBC, WTLV mounted a strong challenge to WJXT, even beating it in the July 1991 sweeps at 11 p.m. by one percentage point of television viewers. Though WJXT continued to hold a commanding lead at 6 p.m., WTLV had leads among younger viewers and those newer to the market. The Webb–Ladendorff duo also provided WTLV with stability on its evening newscasts, which it had not typically enjoyed. However, after 1991, the station's late news ratings momentum plateaued. WJXT responded to WTLV by adding early evening newscasts and increasing its community involvement. That station rebounded as WTLV cooled, with channel 4 holding a 10-percentage-point lead at 11 p.m. by November 1993. The newscasts were retooled again; Ladendorff had left earlier in the year to become a college instructor, and Webb was dismissed at year's end. By February 2000, the last ratings survey before the launch of First Coast News, WTLV was within three percentage points of WJXT at 11 p.m. but much further behind in early evening news, where WJXT had double the viewers at 6 p.m.

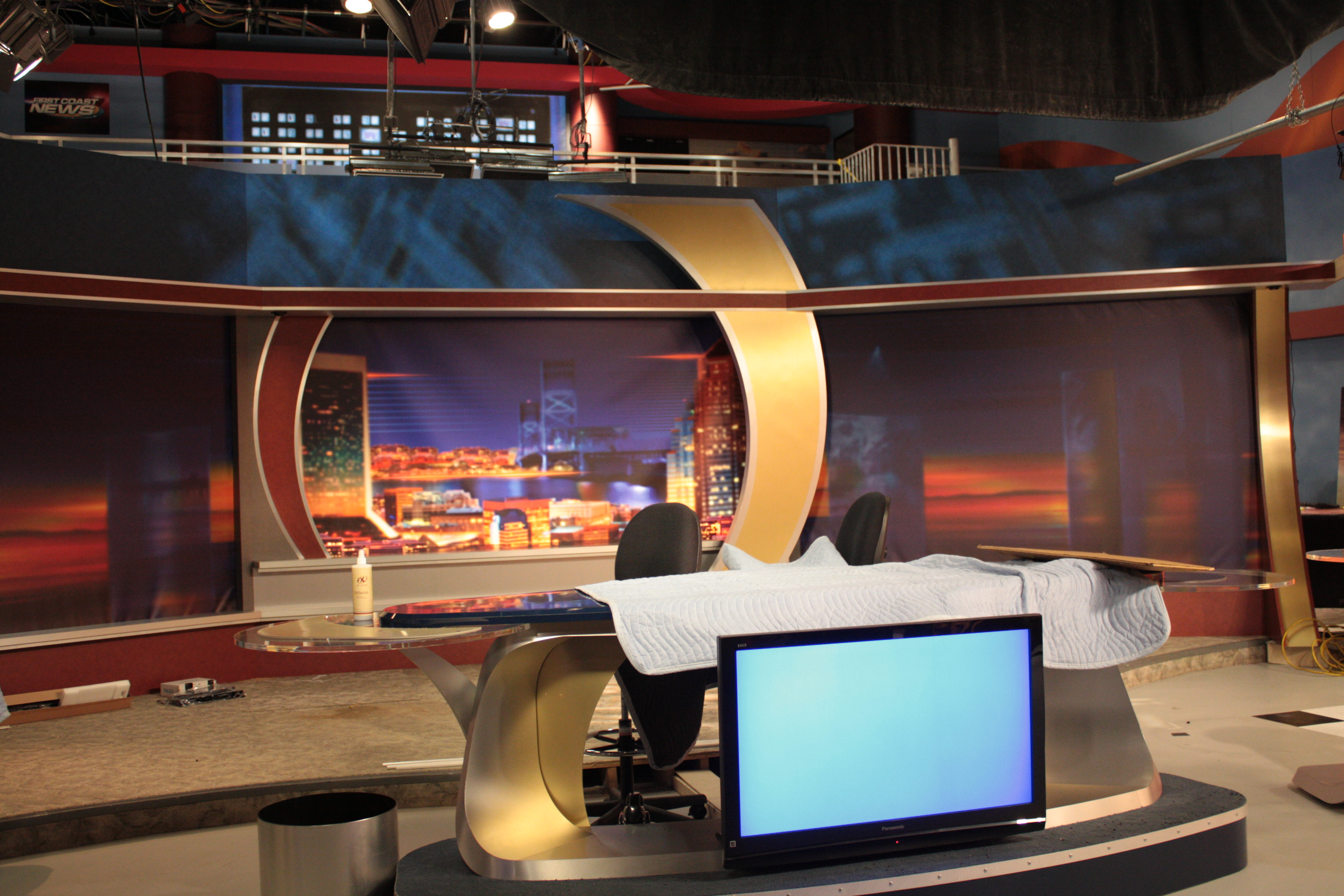
News set used by First Coast News in the 2010s

After the merger, continuing a trend already set by WTLV, the gap in viewership between First Coast News and market leader WJXT slowly closed to create tough competition in the Jacksonville market. The combination of WTLV and WJXX also surpassed WJXT in total revenue.

In 2002, the news department of Fox affiliate WAWS (channel 30) expanded to accommodate the move of the CBS affiliation to WTEV-TV (channel 47). The two stations rebranded as WFOX-TV and WJAX-TV and their news as Action News in 2014 as part of a wholesale change which included the firing of the previous main anchors. The Action News revamp improved ratings at the traditional third-place news operation in Jacksonville just as First Coast News remained without a news director for a year, causing a decline in viewership, and several key news personalities defected to Action News. Rob Mennie, who assumed the post of news director in 2014, noted of the newsroom as he encountered it, "This was a station ... I'll just use the word confused. They didn't know who they were. ... They were trying to figure out what makes us tick." In 2023, Action News edged out First Coast News at 11 p.m. in total households but not in viewers 25–54, with both newscasts behind WJXT, which has remained Jacksonville's news leader as an independent station.

=== Notable staff ===
* Victor Blackwell – anchor[120]

- Jeannie Blaylock – anchor, since 1985
- Donna Deegan – anchor, 1988–2012 (known as Donna Clewis until 1990 and Donna Hicken until 2007)
- Curtis Dvorak – morning show contributor and co-host of First Coast Living
- Alan Gionet – anchor, 1998–2006
- Dan Hicken – sports anchor, 1986–2013
- Shannon Ogden – co-anchor, 2006–2016
- Jack Diamond – part-time weekend weatherman and host of Good Morning Jacksonville for two months in 1986
- Nick Gregory – meteorologist, 1981
- Morris Jones – anchor, 1981–1983
- Jennifer Lopez – weekend meteorologist, 1997–2000
- Joan Lovett – co-host of Good Morning Jacksonville, 1986–1988
- Curt Menefee – weekend sports anchor, 1991–1992
- Lynne Russell – anchor, 1978–1979
- Roseanne Tellez – reporter and substitute anchor, 1988–1990
- Harmon Wages – sports anchor, 1986–1988
- Toni Yates – weekend anchor, 1986–1987

== Technical information ==
=== Subchannels ===
WTLV's transmitter is located on Anders Boulevard on the south side of Jacksonville. Its signal is multiplexed:

Subchannels of WTLV
Subchannel	Res.	Short name	Programming
12.1	1080i	WTLV-HD	NBC
12.2	480i	Antenna	Antenna TV (4:3)
12.3	480i	Crime	True Crime Network
12.4	480i	ROAR	Roar
12.5	480i	ShopLC	Shop LC
12.6	480i	HSN	HSN
12.7	480i	Comet	Comet
12.8	480i	Charge	Charge!

=== Analog-to-digital conversion ===
WTLV began broadcasting a digital signal on VHF channel 13 on April 17 or May 2, 2000, making it the first to do so in Jacksonville. On June 12, 2009, WTLV ended regular programming on its analog signal, on VHF channel 12, as part of the federally mandated transition from analog to digital television; for a short time thereafter, the analog signal broadcast a nightlight service to provide transition information. The digital signal remained on channel 13. In 2024, WTLV was approved to move its signal to the UHF band on channel 33.
