= Rust Craft Greeting Card Company =

American greeting card company

Coordinates: 42.2316°N 71.1690°W

The Rust Craft Greeting Card Company was an American greeting card and printing company and owner of television stations.

== Origins ==
The company was founded in a bookstore in Kansas City, Missouri, in 1906 by its owner, Fred Winslow Rust. The company's first Christmas card was printed on heavy tan paper and included a brief message in two colors. The success of the Christmas card grew into a business letters, postcards, and greeting cards with envelopes. Rust revolutionized the use of the "French Fold," which turned a single piece of paper into a card by folding it into quarters. They were the first company to sell greeting cards with a fitted envelope.

Rust was soon joined by his brother Donald. Fred then began to focus more on the creative and sales aspects of the company while Donald managed the manufacturing and finances. In time, the offerings grew to include cards for holidays including Valentine's Day, Easter, St. Patrick's Day, and Thanksgiving. In addition, cards were produced with bon voyage and travel messages, and even cards with messages in Braille.

== Move to Massachusetts ==
The brothers eventually retired from the book store and moved to Massachusetts to focus on the greeting cards. At first the company was located at 1000 Washington Street in Boston's South End neighborhood.

Needing more space, the company built a new facility on Rustcraft Road in nearby Dedham, Massachusetts, in 1954 at a cost of $3,500,000. An aerial photo of the 9,000 square foot facility on a nine acre lot ran in newspapers across the country following its grand opening on July 23, 1955. The grand opening celebrations included a "700-year-old 'Bless House'" ceremony that included authentically garbed musicians standing atop the clock tower. Six drummers with kettle drums and four trumpeters with four foot long heraldic trumpets facing the four cardinal directions warded off evil spirits and summoned good ones.

Father William Kenneally from St. Mary’s Catholic Church and Reverend Rudolph Roell from St. Paul’s Episcopal Church also blessed the building. At the time, it was the largest greeting card factory in the world.

Town officials gave Donald Rust a silk flag with the company's logo on it and a framed replica of the original deed by which the English settlers purchased the land from the indigenous peoples native to the area to welcome the company to Dedham. Members of the public were invited to tour the facility, and 10,000 people did. They were greeted by "Rustie", the company's goodwill ambassador, who the Dedham Transcript described as "a living greeting card herself, warm and friendly, lovely to look at, and with a cheery greeting for everyone".

The company was known officially as United Printers and Publishers until 1962, when with its purchase and founding of television stations and some radio station purchases beginning several years before, began to trade off the good will of its product trademarks, rebranding the card line to Rust Craft Greeting Card Company, with the television division known as Rust Craft Broadcasting.

== Sale and closure ==
The company remained in Dedham until 1980 when it was purchased by Ziff Davis the year before for $89 million, who also owned Norcross Greeting Card Company. The printing assets were secondary to Ziff Davis, which mainly wanted Rust Craft for its six small-market television stations. Rust Craft's manufacturing was moved to Norcross's existing facility in West Chester, Pennsylvania. Windsor Communications soon purchased Rust Craft and Norcross when Ziff Davis spun them off while retaining the broadcasting arm. Windsor spent $10 million in 1981 to close the Dedham plant, incentivize employees to stay on, and to move operations.

With the consolidation of the card industry around Rust Craft's original hometown rival, Hallmark Cards, along with American Greetings, the greeting card operation soon went bankrupt, as the combined Norcross-Rust Craft operation only held 6–7% market share. American Greetings then purchased the merged Norcross-Rust Craft assets out of the bankruptcy. At the time it went out of business in 1982, it had a Canadian affiliate, Rust Craft Ltd.

A collection of archived Rust Craft and Norcross cards, along with other archival materials dating back to pre-Declaration times in the mid-18th century, was donated to the Smithsonian Institution after the company went out of business.

The company's former Dedham headquarters, located near Massachusetts Route 128, would find new purpose, as it would be subdivided, and today the former factory is home to several commercial and industrial businesses taking advantage of fast access to what is also I-95, along with an American Red Cross blood donation facility.

== Former stations ==
- Stations are arranged within a sortable table, in alphabetical order by state and city of license .
- Two boldface asterisks appearing following a station's call letters (**) indicate a station built and signed on by Rust Craft.

Stations owned by Rust Craft
| Media market | State | Station | Purchased | Sold | Notes |
|---|---|---|---|---|---|
| Jacksonville | Florida | WJKS-TV ** | 1966 | 1979 | |
| Augusta | Georgia | WRDW-TV | 1960 | 1979 | |
| Saginaw–Flint | Michigan | WEYI-TV | 1972 | 1979 | |
| Rochester | New York | WROC-TV | 1964 | 1979 | |
| Chattanooga | Tennessee | WRCB-TV | 1961 | 1979 | |
| Wheeling | West Virginia | WSTV-TV ** | 1953 | 1979 | |

== Rust family ==
The Rust brothers were born in Belfast, Maine, but moved to Kansas City as boys. Fred wrote and published three volumes of poetry. He lived in Newton, Massachusetts, with his wife and son and had a summer house in Cohasset, Massachusetts. He died in 1949 at the age of 73. Donald had two sons with his wife, and later had four grandchildren. He died in 1961 at 84, having spent his final years in Cohasset.

== Works cited ==
- Dedham Historical Society (2001). Images of America: Dedham. Arcadia Publishing. ISBN 978-0-7385-0944-0.
