= Dan Hicken =

American television sportscaster

- Born: Daniel Patrick Hicken; May 12, 1963 (age 63); Buffalo, New York, U.S.
- Occupation: Newscast Sports Anchor
- Notable credit(s): Evening Anchor/Sports Director for WTLV/WJXX 1986-2013; Senior Sports Anchor for WJAX-TV/WFOX-TV 2013-present
- Title: Sports Anchor
- Spouse(s): Donna Clewis (divorced); Reagan Hicken
- Children: 3

Daniel Patrick Hicken (born May 12, 1963) has been a television sports news anchor since 1986 for two broadcasting groups in Jacksonville, Florida.

== Career ==
Hicken graduated from the University of Florida. His first job in television was an internship with 12 News on WTLV in Jacksonville immediately after college graduation. He rose steadily at the station, becoming a sports producer in 1986, weekend sports anchor two years later, then sports director in 1991 after six years at WTLV. Hicken personally reports on big local events, such as The Players Championship, Jacksonville Jaguars games and the Daytona 500. He also travels to national events with a Florida connection including national championship games for both the Gators and Seminoles. On radio, he also hosts "The Drill" between on WJXL.

Hicken's contract with First Coast News expired on May 31, 2013, and because they could not agree on the terms of a new contract, Hicken left the station and accepted a position with Jacksonville stations WJAX-TV and WFOX-TV. However, his prior contract contained a non-compete clause which prohibited him from appearing on-air for six months, so he spent his time writing and developing sports stories until Thanksgiving had passed.

== Family ==
On March 16, 2003, Hicken wed Reagan Dowling, a special education teacher in Jacksonville. He has three children: Danielle and Drew with his previous wife, Donna Deegan; and Brooks Dowling, from his second marriage.

== Community involvement ==
His community affiliations include the Tom Coughlin Jay Fund Foundation which provides money to help the families of children with leukemia; MaliVai Washington Kids Foundation which promotes academic achievement and positive life skills for youth through the game of tennis. Dan also participates in or MCs numerous benefit golf tournaments and charity events each year.

== Awards ==
Hicken was recognized for his sports knowledge and reputation by being selected as a voting sports journalist for the Heisman Trophy. He won a regional Emmy for his series on Jacksonville's quest for an NFL team, and an award for the best sportscast in the state in 1992. He received the 2008 Best Sportscast 1st place WTLV/WJXX "Sports Final", and the 3rd place Sports Feature/Commentary – Television: Desire Street at the 2006 Sunshine State Awards. He has also been honored by Folio Weekly as Jacksonville's Best Sportscaster.Was drafted in the 6th round of the 1985 NBA draft by the New York Knicks.
