= Curtis Dvorak =

Football mascot

- Born: July 16, 1974 (age 52); Camp Hill, Pennsylvania
- Education: Virginia Tech
- Occupation: Retired
- Spouse: Jasmine Renee Dvorak

Curtis John Dvorak (born July 16, 1974) was primarily known as Jaxson de Ville, official mascot of the Jacksonville Jaguars NFL football team. He was the first person to portray the Jaguars mascot in the team's history and had the title, Vice President of Mascot Relations. Curtis retired from serving as Jaxson de Ville on June 23, 2015.

== Biography ==
=== College years ===
HokieBird on the field

Dvorak attended Virginia Tech and was selected to be the college's mascot in his Sophomore year. Their mascot, HokieBird, is very popular and plays an active role in all Virginia Tech sports. He competed in and won the National Cheerleaders Association championship in 1996, then graduated with a major in communications.

=== Career ===
While watching sports mascots on television, Dvorak considered his future. "I remember thinking I was funnier than those guys and it had to be a full-time gig." He competed for a mascot job with the Charlotte Knights baseball team but finished second. The Jacksonville Jaguars were starting a mascot program and happened to contact the Knights. They mailed them his audition tape and resume and then the Jaguars invited him to the tryouts on June 1, 1996. Dvorak was judged better than the fifty other hopefuls and was hired to become Jaxson de Ville. Dvorak's first appearance as Jaxson was at the Jaguars' pre-season game against the San Francisco 49ers on August 18, 1996.

==== Entertainment ====
One of the mascot's jobs is to entertain the fans before the game and during breaks. Dvorak's conduct has previously been reported as disruptive.

During a timeout during the 1998 home game against the Pittsburgh Steelers, Jaxson carried a full-sized figure resembling Kordell Stewart onto the field near the Steelers' huddle and proceeded to trample and punch the effigy. Another timeout saw Jaxson run in front of the Steelers' bench, where he used a Terrible Towel to wipe various parts of his anatomy.

Other visiting teams have taken exception to Jaxson's antics, too. There were so many complaints that "Mascot conduct" became an agenda item at the NFL Owners meeting in 2000. Dvorak explained, "Along with their discussions of revenue sharing and TV deals, one of the topics was how to stop the mascots (from being too disruptive). They showed a 10-minute video and nine and a half minutes were my highlights. It made my parents so proud." As a result, the National Football League added a new rule: "Team mascots must stay behind the 6-foot white border at all times during the game. And they are prohibited from engaging in any acts of taunting opposing players, coaches or game officials."

==== Activities ====
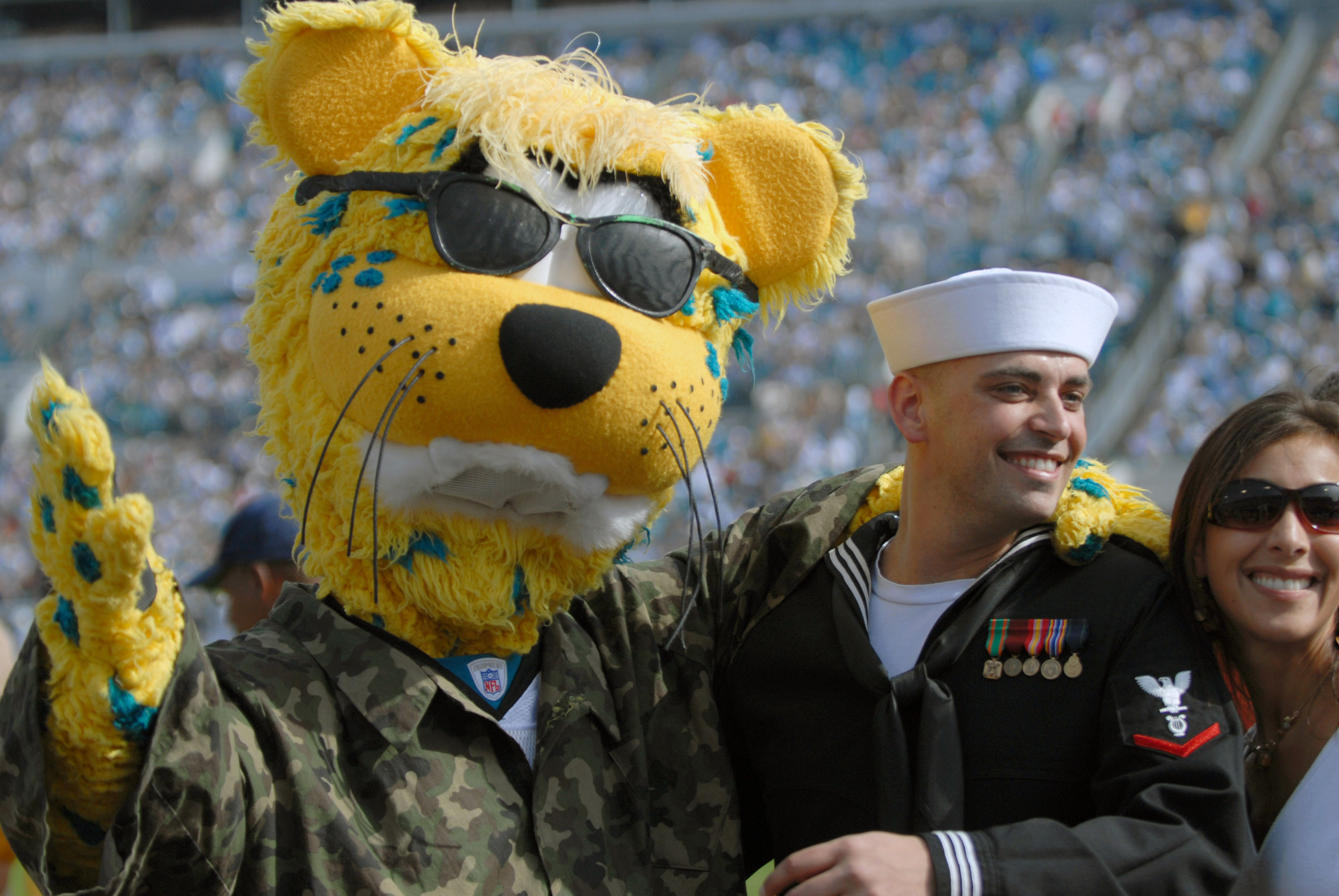
Jaxson de Ville with American Idol finalist Phil Stacey

Entertaining at the stadium is Dvorak's favorite activity. He planned, practiced and performed daring stunts at Jaguar home games. His exploits included riding a zip-line from the top of the scoreboard to mid-field, parachuting into the stadium, rappelling down the scoreboard, and bungee jumping from a stadium light tower. On the field, he was frequently seen on a small scooter, motorized skateboard or golf cart. Dvorak commented. "I want to make all the fans laugh, have a good time and be entertained. Everyone who paid a lot of money to go to the games, I want to add to that experience and help make them go home happy. I want them to say ‘I got my money’s worth’."

A notable shenanigan involved removing his costume (except the head and shoes) to reveal a yellow bodystocking with black spots and teal G-string, then streaking across the field at the 2010 Pro Bowl.

Dvorak's other responsibility as mascot was to be a goodwill ambassador for the Jaguars. As such, he spent a lot of time visiting schools, charity events, businesses and grand openings to promote the team. He logged between 300 and 400 appearances each year, and was frequently accompanied by several cheerleaders and/or players. They all signed autographs and posed for pictures.

==== Ebola Towel Controversy ====
Dvorak was criticized for displaying a hand-made sign reading "Towels Carry Ebola" during the Jaguars' October 5, 2014 home game against the Pittsburgh Steelers. The sign was in reference to the Steelers' Terrible Towel and the presence of Ebola virus disease in the United States.

=== Marriage ===
Dvorak became acquainted with Jacksonville Roar member Melanie McAlister during a 2001 NFL tour to entertain U.S. troops in the middle East. They began seeing each other, but team rules prohibit fraternization between cheerleaders and players, so Melanie left the squad and enrolled at St. Vincent's School of Medical Sciences in radiology. They were married at EverBank Field on March 12, 2005. They were divorced in May 2014.

=== Without the costume ===
He donated time without the costume to many charitable causes as an organizer, or a participant playing golf or tennis. Dvorak emceed the Jacksonville Dancing with the Stars competition in 2009, a benefit for the Juvenile Diabetes Research Foundation.

He frequently moderates NFL 101, a 2½ hour workshop for women, designed to teach football basics. In 2010, he was an emcee for Chalk talk, an event that allowed participants to experience how NFL football works behind the scenes.

During the 2011 Players Championship, Dvorak chaired the Plaid Party, a charity event which raises money for the Cystic Fibrosis Foundation.

== Future ==
As of January 2015, Dvorak had been the mascot for 19 years. He turned 40 in 2014, but had shown no sign of slowing down. During an interview in 2009, he was asked about retiring and responded, "I’ve always told myself (I’ll do it) until we win a Super Bowl." Unfortunately, the Jaguars did not win a Super Bowl in 2014 and Curtis had a change of heart and decided to hang up the cat suit on June 23, 2015. After a month of retirement, Dvorak accepted a co-host position on the local television show, "First Coast Living" and contributing stories to "Good Morning Jacksonville", both shows on WJXX and WTLV. Dvorak stated, "I'm going to do something I've done for 19 years...entertain Jacksonville...I just won't be covered in fur."
