= Shannon Ogden =

American news anchor

- Born: Jacksonville, Florida
- Status: Married
- Occupation: Journalist
- Spouse: Torrey Ogden
- Children: Daffodil Ogden
- Family: Yes

Shannon Ogden is an anchor at Denver7 in Denver, Colorado. Ogden co-anchors the weeknight 5, 6, and 10 p.m. newscasts. He joined Denver7 in 2016 and was named Best News Anchor by the Colorado Broadcasters Association in his first year.

Ogden was born and raised in Arkansas and Florida. He attended John Brown University, a non-denominational Christian college in Siloam Springs, Arkansas.

Ogden moved to Jacksonville's WTLV/WJXX in April 2006 from Boston, where he was an anchor/reporter at New England Cable News. After interning with CNN in Brussels, Belgium, his television career has taken him to his native Arkansas, Missouri, Utah, and most recently Massachusetts. While at NECN, Shannon co-anchored Good Morning Live (NECN's morning program from 6 to 9 a.m.), anchored a daily business broadcast, hosted Jay Carr's Screening Room (NECN's movie review program), and hosted a popular weekly home show.

Ogden has anchored some of the biggest national stories, including the September 11, 2001 attacks, the Rhode Island nightclub fire, and the Catholic Church sex abuse scandal.

== Awards and recognition ==
Shannon has won a national Gracie Award from the American Women in Radio and Television and a regional Emmy for coverage of the fatal crash of American Airlines Flight 1420 in Little Rock, Arkansas.
