= WJXT =

Television station in Jacksonville, Florida

ATSC 3.0 station
- Jacksonville, Florida; United States
- Channels: Digital: 18 (UHF); Virtual: 4
- Branding: Channel 4, News4JAX

Programming
- Affiliations: 4.1: Independent; for others, see § Subchannels

Ownership
- Owner: Graham Media Group; (Graham Media Group, Florida, Inc.)
- Sister stations: WCWJ

History
- First air date: October 16, 1949
- Former call signs: WMBR-TV (1949–1958)
- Former channel numbers: Analog: 4 (VHF, 1949–2009); Digital: 42 (UHF, until 2020)
- Former affiliations: CBS (1949–2002); DuMont (secondary, 1949–1955); NBC (secondary, 1949–1957); ABC (secondary, 1949–1966)
- Call sign meaning: "JXT" = Jax Television (sic) Jax being the common nickname for the city

Technical information
- Licensing authority: FCC
- Facility ID: 53116
- ERP: 670 kW
- HAAT: 303.9 m (997 ft)
- Transmitter coordinates: 30°16′25″N 81°33′12″W

Links
- Public license information: Public file; LMS
- Website: www.news4jax.com

WJXT (channel 4) is an independent television station in Jacksonville, Florida, United States. It is owned by Graham Media Group alongside CW affiliate WCWJ (channel 17). The two stations share studios at 4 Broadcast Place on the south bank of the St. Johns River in Jacksonville; WJXT's transmitter is located on Anders Boulevard in the city's Killarney Shores section.

== History ==
=== As a CBS affiliate ===
WJXT originally signed on the air on October 16, 1949, as WMBR-TV. It was Jacksonville's first television station, the second television station in Florida and a primary CBS affiliate on VHF channel 4 after WTVJ (also on channel 4, now an NBC owned-and-operated station on channel 6) in Miami–Fort Lauderdale. The station was co-owned alongside WMBR radio (1460 AM, now WQOP; and 96.1 FM, now WEJZ). Though the station was originally a primary CBS affiliate, it also maintained secondary affiliations with NBC, ABC and the DuMont Television Network. In 1953, the WMBR stations were purchased by The Washington Post Company. In 1954, the station became the first in the state of Florida to broadcast in color. WMBR-TV dropped the DuMont affiliation in 1955, less than a year before the network ceased operations. Since its only competition in the Jacksonville market came from UHF station WJHP-TV (which signed on in 1953 and went dark three years later), channel 4 had a virtual television monopoly in northern Florida until September 1957, when it lost the NBC affiliation to upstart WFGA (channel 12, now WTLV).

The Washington Post Company sold WMBR-AM-FM in July 1958, while it kept the television station, whose callsign it changed to the current WJXT. WJXT remained a primary CBS and secondary ABC affiliate until WJKS-TV (channel 17, now CW sister station WCWJ) took the ABC affiliation upon its sign-on in February 1966, leaving WJXT exclusively with CBS. For much of its tenure as a CBS affiliate, WJXT was the only station affiliated with the network that was located between Savannah, Georgia, and Orlando, Florida, and was thus carried on many cable systems between Jacksonville and Orlando.

In 1973, WJXT's FCC license renewal was challenged by supporters of President Richard Nixon following the Watergate coverage of his administration by The Washington Post, whose parent company owned the station. Robert W. Schellenberg, WJXT's general manager, successfully led the effort to defeat the opposition.

In 2001, WJXT was awarded the local broadcast rights to Jacksonville Jaguars preseason football games, replacing WTLV as the official station for the NFL franchise (WTLV had carried preseason games and Jaguars-related programs starting with the team's 1995 inaugural season); the deal also included carriage of the team's coaches show and other Jaguars-related television programs. The station had already been airing Jaguars games since 1998, when CBS gained the national broadcast rights to football games from the NFL's American Football Conference division. That year, speculation arose that WJXT would become an independent station after it had reached only a one-year affiliation renewal with the network, instead of the four- to eight-year affiliation agreement that stations usually obtain from the major broadcast networks.

=== Independence ===
During negotiations between Post-Newsweek Stations and CBS on a new affiliation agreement in early 2002, CBS supplied Post-Newsweek with a list of demands that would have resulted in WJXT no longer receiving monetary compensation for the carriage of the network's programming (CBS was moving toward a reverse compensation model for its affiliates during this time) and would have required the station to run the entire CBS network schedule in pattern without preemptions, except for extended local breaking news and severe weather coverage. Station and Post-Newsweek company management believed these stipulations would come at the expense of local programming. Rather than give in to CBS's demands, Post-Newsweek Stations announced on April 3, 2002, that it would not renew channel 4's affiliation agreement with CBS, which was set to expire on July 10.

UPN affiliate WTEV-TV (channel 47, now WJAX-TV)—at that time owned by Clear Channel Communications—subsequently signed an agreement with CBS to become the network's new Jacksonville affiliate two weeks after WJXT's disaffiliation announcement on April 23, 2002. The affiliation switch became official at 5 a.m. on July 15, 2002, ending WJXT's 53-year association with CBS. This also triggered an affiliation switch in Gainesville where WGFL became a CBS affiliate; that station was a primary affiliate of The WB at the time.

As an independent, WJXT expanded its news programming and began filling daytime, prime time and late night timeslots that were formerly occupied by CBS programs with additional syndicated programming, as well as replacing network sports coverage with SEC college football and basketball telecasts from the syndicated sports provider Jefferson Pilot Sports (later Raycom Sports). WJXT retained rights to Jaguars preseason games for one additional year following the switch, despite the fact that the AFC regular season and playoff football games had moved to WTEV due to national broadcast rights held by CBS and a contract stipulation that reserved the team the right to move local broadcasts of preseason games and other Jaguars programs to another station if WJXT changed its network affiliation. The team cut ties with WJXT after the 2002 NFL preseason and moved its preseason games to WTEV-TV in 2003.

WJXT does not entirely follow the same "Local" branding scheme as its Graham Media sister stations, although it uses the on-air slogan "The Local Station", and in 2014, the station adopted a slanted logo similar to Detroit NBC affiliate WDIV-TV, but with elements of its previous boxed 4, alongside changing its news branding to News4JAX.

On May 27, 2016, it was announced that CW affiliate WCWJ, along with WSLS-TV in Roanoke, Virginia, would be sold to Graham Media for $120 million as part of the station divestitures required as a result of the pending merger of the Nexstar Broadcasting Group, then-owners of WCWJ, and WCWJ's former owner Media General. The sale was approved by the FCC on January 11, 2017, and completed January 17, making WJXT part of a duopoly (Graham Media's first) with WCWJ.

In 2025, WJXT announced an agreement with Sporting Club Jacksonville of the USL Super League to broadcast seven matches.

== News operation ==
WJXT presently broadcasts 59 hours of locally produced newscasts each week (with 10 hours each weekday, 5 1/2 hours on Saturdays and 3 1/2 hours on Sundays); in regards to the number of hours devoted to local news programming, it is the third-highest newscast output among Florida's television stations, behind Fox stations WTVT in Tampa and WSVN in Miami (which respectively broadcast 72 1/2 and 63 1/2 hours of newscasts each week).

Because of the ownership structure of the Jacksonville market's Big Four network affiliates, WJXT is the only television station in the market whose news department operates independently of the other local stations (WTLV and WJXX have jointly produced their newscasts since WTLV owner Gannett's 2000 purchase of WJXX and the resulting consolidation of their news departments, and WAWS transferred production duties of its news department to SSA partner WTEV following that station's 2002 affiliation switch to CBS).

Channel 4 used the Eyewitness News format for its newscasts for 38 years from 1967 to 2005, when its newscasts were retitled as Channel 4 News. From 1997 until the station became independent in 2002, WJXT identified as News Channel 4 for general branding purposes, while the Eyewitness News title continued in use for its newscasts. This made for some rather verbose station announcements ("From WJXT News Channel 4 ... this is Eyewitness News"). Since 2014, it has been known as News 4 Jax, a nod to its longtime website URL.

WJXT has been the dominant news station in Jacksonville for almost half a century, a status it has retained even as an independent. This is in part because many of its personalities have been at the station for ten years or more, unusual given that Jacksonville has always been a medium-sized market. Its evening news team of anchors Tom Wills and Deborah Gianoulis, chief meteorologist George Winterling and sports director Sam Kouvaris were together for 22 years from 1981 until Gianoulis's retirement in 2003 – one of the longest-running anchor teams in the nation at the time. Upon losing its CBS affiliation, channel 4 rebranded as a news-intensive independent station. Following the example of a number of former Big Three affiliates that switched to Fox in the 1990s, it maintains a news schedule similar to its latter days as a CBS affiliate. It retained all existing newscasts, while tacking two additional hours onto its weekday morning program and adding a 6:30 p.m. newscast on weeknights (the former two replacing The Early Show and the CBS Evening News) and a 10 p.m. newscast seven nights a week (airing for an hour on weeknights and a half-hour on weekends).

On January 14, 2009, beginning with its noon newscast, WJXT became the first television station in the Jacksonville market to begin broadcasting its local newscasts in high definition (unlike most stations that transitioned their newscasts to HD, certain newscasts were not upgraded until later dates: the 5 and 6 p.m. newscasts would not upgrade to HD until two days later on January 16; the weekend newscasts on January 17 and the weekday morning, and 10 and 11 p.m. newscasts respectively upgraded to HD on January 26 and 28). The upgrade saw the introduction of new on-air graphics (opens were designed in-house at Detroit sister station WDIV-TV, while the graphics were designed at Miami sister station WPLG) and news music (commissioning an updated version of the "WJXT News Theme", a customized package that was originally used from 1992 to 1997, and was composed specifically for the station by Gari Media Group), as well as the upgrade to robotic and computer-operated cameras for studio segments within its newscasts, the automation of its control room using the Miranda Vertigo system and Ignite technology.

On April 23, 2009, George Winterling announced he would semi-retire after nearly 47 years as WJXT's chief meteorologist. On May 20, 2009, Winterling stepped down as meteorologist for the station's 6 and 6:30 p.m. newscasts.

On May 21, 2012, Metro Jacksonville, a news and discussion blog on local urban issues, announced that it would enter into a content partnership with WJXT. Under the agreement, Metro Jacksonville formatted content for WJXT's News4Jax.com website on a self-branded page. The mutually beneficial partnership provided WJXT with more web content and provided Metro Jacksonville with a wider audience. On October 28, 2013, WJXT expanded its weekday morning newscast to 5½ hours, with the addition of an hour to the program from 9 to 10 a.m.

=== Notable former on-air staff ===
- Bryan J. Kelly – traffic reporter (now announcer for the WWE as "Byron Saxton")
- Steve Kroft – investigative reporter, 1975–1977
- Mike Patrick – sports anchor, 1970–1974
- Randall Pinkston – reporter, 1974–1976
- George Winterling (AMS Certified Consulting Meteorologist Seal of Approval) – hurricane expert; chief meteorologist, 1962–2009
- Toni Yates – weekend anchor, 1990–1991

== Technical information ==
=== Subchannels ===
Subchannels provided by WJXT (ATSC 1.0)
Subchannel	Res.	Short name	Programming	ATSC 1.0 host
4.1	720p	WJXT-HD	Main WJXT programming	WCWJ
4.2	720p	DABL	Dabl	WJCT
4.3	480i	WJXT-D3	Start TV	WCWJ

=== Analog-to-digital conversion ===
On June 12, 2009, at 8:55 a.m. (during its broadcast of the weekday morning newscast The Morning Show), WJXT terminated its analog signal, on VHF channel 4, as part of the federally mandated transition from analog to digital television. The station's digital signal remained on its pre-transition UHF channel 42, using virtual channel 4.

WJXT anchor/reporter Melanie Lawson reported live from WJXT's Killarney Shores transmitter site as a veteran station technician pushed the "plate off" button in the building at the base of the transmitter. The WJXT analog signal had transmitted from that site for over two decades following a failure on the original transmitter tower at the station's 4 Broadcast Place studios. The station's digital transmitter also broadcasts from the same site, alongside the digital transmitters of NBC affiliate WTLV and ABC affiliate WJXX. Several monitors at WJXT's South Bank studios were reported by on-camera talent to have gone out upon the digital switchover.

=== ATSC 3.0 lighthouse service ===
On December 10, 2024, WJXT converted from an ATSC 1.0 signal to ATSC 3.0 (NextGen TV) broadcasting. The station's ATSC 1.0 subchannels were moved to other broadcasters for simulcasting, while WJXT became the "lighthouse" host for the ATSC 3.0 transmission of WJXT, WCWJ, and WJCT.

Subchannels of WJXT (ATSC 3.0)
Subchannel	Short name	Programming
4.1	WJXT-HD	Independent
7.1	WJCT	PBS (WJCT)
17.1	WCWJ	The CW (WCWJ)
17.2	Bounce	Bounce TV (WCWJ)
