= Alan Gionet =

American journalist

- Status: Married
- Occupation: Journalist

Alan Gionet is an American journalist reporting for KCNC-TV, the CBS owned-and-operated station in Denver. From 2010 to 2020, Gionet anchored the station's weekday morning and noon newscasts.

== Career ==
Gionet has been in news for more than thirty years. He started in the small market of Tupelo, Mississippi; he also anchored and reported in at WOOD-TV in Grand Rapids, Michigan. He worked as an investigative reporter in Providence, Rhode Island prior to his first stint at CBS 4.

He worked at KCNC CBS 4 from the early 1990s until leaving for Jacksonville in April 1998. Prior to joining CBS 4 for a second stint in 2006, Gionet was the main anchor and nightside managing editor at WTLV/WJXX in Jacksonville, Florida. While in Jacksonville, he logged many hours during hurricanes and the 2000 election controversy, when he revealed more than 20,000 over and under votes in Duval County. One of his most memorable stories was his reporting on the endangered North Atlantic right whales, bringing national focus to an unpopular species which has only an estimated 300 whales left.

Gionet studied broadcast journalism at Emerson College in Boston, Massachusetts. He also studied at Harvard Extension School and the University of Massachusetts Boston and Amherst.
