= Hickox, Georgia =

- Unincorporated community Census-designated place
- ÷ Hickox (the United States)
- Coordinates: 31°9′0″N 81°59′47″W
- Country: United States
- State: Georgia
- County: Brantley

Area
  - Total: 2.69 sq mi (6.96 km^{2})
  - Land: 2.68 sq mi (6.94 km^{2})
  - Water: 0.0039 sq mi (0.01 km^{2})
- Elevation: 65 ft (20 m)

Population (2020)
  - Total: 234
  - Density: 87/sq mi (33.7/km^{2})
- Time zone: UTC-5 (Eastern (EST))
  - Summer (DST): UTC-4 (EDT)
- ZIP Code: 31553 (Nahunta)
- Area code: 912
- FIPS code: 13-38292
- GNIS feature ID: 2812666

Hickox is an unincorporated community and census-designated place (CDP) in south-central Brantley County, Georgia, United States. It is on U.S. Route 301, 4 miles (6 km) south of Nahunta and 22 miles (35 km) north of Folkston. The 2020 census listed a population of 234.

== Demographics ==
Historical population
Census	Pop.	Note	%±
2020	234		—
U.S. Decennial Census; 2020

Hickox first appeared as a census designated place in the 2020 U.S. census.

Hickox CDP, Georgia – Racial and ethnic composition Note: the US Census treats Hispanic/Latino as an ethnic category. This table excludes Latinos from the racial categories and assigns them to a separate category. Hispanics/Latinos may be of any race.
Race / Ethnicity (NH = Non-Hispanic)	Pop 2020	% 2020
White alone (NH)	223	95.30%
Black or African American alone (NH)	1	0.43%
Native American or Alaska Native alone (NH)	1	0.43%
Asian alone (NH)	1	0.43%
Pacific Islander alone (NH)	0	0.00%
Some Other Race alone (NH)	0	0.00%
Mixed Race or Multi-Racial (NH)	5	2.14%
Hispanic or Latino (any race)	3	1.28%
Total	234	100.00%

In 2020, the CDP had a population of 234, and the majority of its population identified as non-Hispanic white (95.30%). Among the population, 2.14% were multiracial, 1.28% Hispanic or Latino of any race, 0.43% African American, 0.43% Native American, and 0.43% Asian alone.
