= List of comedy films of the 1960s =

A list of comedy films released in the 1960s.

Title	Director	Cast	Country	Subgenre/Notes
1960
The Apartment		Billy Wilder	United States	Comedy/Drama
The Bellboy		Jerry Lewis	United States	
Bells Are Ringing		Dean Martin	United States	Musical/Romantic Comedy
Cinderfella	Frank Tashlin	Jerry Lewis	United States	
Doctor in Love	Ralph Thomas	James Robertson Justice, Michael Craig, Leslie Phillips, Carole Lesley and Joan Sims	United Kingdom	
The Facts of Life			United States	Romantic Comedy
G.I. Blues		Elvis Presley	United States	Musical Comedy
It Started in Naples			United States	Romantic Comedy
The Little Shop of Horrors		Jonathan Haze as Seymour Krelborn	United States	Dark Comedy/Horror
North to Alaska			United States	Western Comedy
Ocean's Eleven			United States	
Please Don't Eat the Daisies			United States	
Stop! Look! and Laugh!			United States	
Visit to a Small Planet			United States	Sci-Fi/Comedy
The Wackiest Ship in the Army			United States	Comedy-Drama
Wake Me When It's Over			United States	
Where the Boys Are			United States	Romantic Comedy
The Wizard of Baghdad			United States	Fantasy/Comedy
Battle of the Sexes			United Kingdom	
Dentist in the Chair			United Kingdom	
Doctor in Love			United Kingdom	
Don't Panic, Chaps!			United Kingdom	
The Grass Is Greener			United Kingdom	Romantic Comedy
Light up the Sky			United Kingdom	Comedy-Drama
Make Mine Mink			United Kingdom	
The Millionairess			United Kingdom	Romantic Comedy
School for Scoundrels			United Kingdom	
The Pure Hell of St Trinian's			United Kingdom	
Two-Way Stretch			United Kingdom	
Watch Your Stern			United Kingdom	
1961
The Absent-Minded Professor			United States	Science Fiction/Comedy
All in a Night's Work			United States	Romantic Comedy
Bachelor in Paradise			United States	Romantic Comedy
Blue Hawaii			United States	Musical/Romantic Comedy/Drama
Breakfast at Tiffany's		Starring Audrey Hepburn	United States	Romantic Comedy
Cry for Happy			United States	
The Errand Boy			United States	
Gidget Goes Hawaiian			United States	Romantic Comedy
The Honeymoon Machine			United States	
The Ladies Man			United States	
The Last Time I Saw Archie			United States	
Lover Come Back			United States	Romantic Comedy
A Majority of One			United States	
The Marriage-Go-Round			United States	
On the Double			United States	
One Hundred and One Dalmatians			United States	Animated film
One, Two, Three			United States	
The Parent Trap			United States	
The Pleasure of His Company			United States	
Pocketful of Miracles			United States	
Romanoff and Juliet			United States	Romantic Comedy
Sail a Crooked Ship			United States	
Swingin' Along			United States	
Snow White and the Three Stooges			United States	
Tammy Tell Me True			United States	
Teenage Millionaire			United States	
The Two Little Bears			United States	
Dentist on the Job			United Kingdom	
In the Doghouse			United Kingdom	
Invasion Quartet			United Kingdom	Comedy-Drama
Nearly a Nasty Accident			United Kingdom	
The Rebel			United Kingdom	
Very Important Person			United Kingdom	
What a Carve Up!		Shirley Eaton	United Kingdom	Horror Comedy
What a Whopper!			United Kingdom	
A Woman Is a Woman			France	Romantic Comedy
1962
40 Pounds of Trouble			United States	
Bachelor Flat			United States	
The Bellboy and the Playgirls			United States	
Bon Voyage!			United States	
Boy's Night Out			United States	Romantic Comedy
Follow That Dream			United States	Musical Comedy
Girls! Girls! Girls!			United States	Musical Comedy
Hatari!			United States	Romantic Comedy
The Horizontal Lieutenant			United States	Romantic Comedy
If a Man Answers			United States	Romantic Comedy
It's Only Money			United States	
It Happened in Athens			United States	Comedy-Drama
Moon Pilot			United States	Sci-fi/Comedy
Mr. Hobbs Takes a Vacation			United States	
My Geisha			United States	Comedy-Drama
The Notorious Landlady			United States	Mystery Comedy
Period of Adjustment			United States	
The Pigeon That Took Rome			United States	
Safe at Home!			United States	
Saintly Sinners			United States	Comedy-Drama
The Road to Hong Kong			United States	Musical Comedy
The Three Stooges Meet Hercules			United States	
The Three Stooges in Orbit			United States	
Tonight for Sure			United States	Romantic Comedy
That Touch of Mink			United States	Romantic Comedy
When the Girls Take Over			United States	
Who's Got the Action?			United States	
Zotz!			United States	Fantasy/Comedy
Only Two Can Play			United Kingdom	
The Dock Brief			United Kingdom	
A Pair of Briefs			United Kingdom	
Twice Round the Daffodils			United Kingdom	
1963
4 for Texas			United States	Western Comedy
Beach Party			United States	
Call Me Bwana			United States	
Charade			United States	Romantic Comedy
The Comedy of Terrors	Jacques Tourneur	Vincent Price, Peter Lorre, Boris Karloff	United States	Horror comedy
Come Blow Your Horn			United States	
The Courtship of Eddie's Father			United States	Romantic Comedy-Drama
Critic's Choice			United States	
Donovan's Reef			United States	Comedy/adventure
Follow the Boys			United States	
Fun in Acapulco			United States	Musical Comedy
Gidget Goes to Rome			United States	Romantic Comedy
Irma la Douce			United States	Romantic Comedy
Island of Love			United States	
It's a Mad, Mad, Mad, Mad World			United States	
Love Is a Ball			United States	Romantic Comedy
The Man from the Diners' Club			United States	
McLintock!			United States	Western Comedy
Move Over, Darling			United States	
A New Kind of Love			United States	Romantic Comedy
The Nutty Professor			United States	
Palm Springs Weekend			United States	
Papa's Delicate Condition			United States	
The Pink Panther			United States	
The Prize			United States	
Promises! Promises!			United States	
Son of Flubber			United States	Science Fiction/Comedy
Soldier in the Rain			United States	
Sunday in New York			United States	Romantic Comedy
Take Her, She's Mine			United States	
The Three Stooges Go Around the World in a Daze		Moe Howard, Larry Fine, Joe DeRita	United States	
The Thrill of It All			United States	Romantic Comedy
Under the Yum Yum Tree			United States	Romantic Comedy
The Wheeler Dealers			United States	Romantic Comedy
Who's Been Sleeping in My Bed?			United States	
Who's Minding the Store?			United States	
The Young Swingers			United States	Musical Comedy
The Raven			United States	Horror Comedy
Billy Liar			United Kingdom	Comedy-Drama
Crooks in Cloisters			United Kingdom	
Ladies Who Do			United Kingdom	
The Punch and Judy Man			United Kingdom	
Nurse on Wheels			United Kingdom	
The Wrong Arm of the Law			United Kingdom	
1964
3 Nuts in Search of a Bolt			United States	
A Shot in the Dark			United States	
The Americanization of Emily			United States	
Bedtime Story			United States	
Bikini Beach			United States	
The Brass Bottle			United States	
3 Nuts in Search of a Bolt			United States	
Dear Heart			United States	Romantic Comedy
Diary of a Bachelor			United States	
Dr. Strangelove or: How I Learned to Stop Worrying and Love the Bomb			United States	
Ensign Pulver			United States	Comedy-Drama
Father Goose			United States	Romantic Comedy
For Those Who Think Young			United States	
A Global Affair			United States	
Good Neighbor Sam			United States	
Goodbye Charlie			United States	Fantasy Comedy
A Hard Day's Night			United States	Musical Comedy
Honeymoon Hotel			United States	Romantic Comedy
I'd Rather Be Rich			United States	Romantic Comedy
The Incredible Mr. Limpet			United States	Comedy/Fantasy/Live-action/animation
Kiss Me, Stupid			United States	
Kisses for My President			United States	
Man's Favorite Sport?	Howard Hawks	Rock Hudson, Paula Prentiss	United States	
McHale's Navy			United States	
The Misadventures of Merlin Jones			United States	Science Fiction/Comedy
My Fair Lady			United States	Musical/Comedy-Drama
Pajama Party			United States	Science Fiction/Comedy
The Patsy			United States	
Quick, Let's Get Married			United States	
Send Me No Flowers			United States	Romantic Comedy
Sex and the Single Girl			United States	
The Unsinkable Molly Brown			United States	Western/Musical Comedy
Viva Las Vegas			United States	Musical/Romantic Comedy
What a Way to Go!			United States	
A Hard Day's Night			United Kingdom	Musical Comedy
Hot Enough for June			United Kingdom	
Nothing But the Best			United Kingdom	Dark comedy
The World of Henry Orient			United States	Comedy-Drama
1965
The Art of Love			United States	
Beach Ball			United States	
Beach Blanket Bingo			United States	
Billie			United States	Musical Comedy
Boeing Boeing			United States	
Cat Ballou		Jane Fonda, Tom Nardini, Dwayne Hickman	United States	Western Comedy
Clarence, the Cross-Eyed Lion			United States	
Dear Brigitte			United States	
Do Not Disturb			United States	Romantic Comedy
Dr. Goldfoot and the Bikini Machine			United States	
The Family Jewels			United States	
That Funny Feeling			United States	
The Girls on the Beach			United States	
The Great Race			United States	
The Hallelujah Trail			United States	Western Comedy
Harum Scarum			United States	Musical Comedy
How to Murder Your Wife			United States	
How to Stuff a Wild Bikini			United States	Musical/Romantic Comedy
I'll Take Sweden			United States	
John Goldfarb, Please Come Home!			United States	
Lady L			United States	
Love and Kisses			United States	
The Loved One			United States	
Marriage on the Rocks			United States	
McHale's Navy Joins the Air Force			United States	
The Monkey's Uncle			United States	
Never Too Late			United States	
One Way Wahine			United States	
The Outlaws IS Coming			United States	
Promise Her Anything			United States	Romantic Comedy
The Rounders			United States	Western Comedy
Tickle Me			United States	Musical Comedy Western
Sergeant Deadhead			United States	Musical Comedy
Situation Hopeless... But Not Serious			United States	
Ski Party			United States	Musical Comedy
Strange Bedfellows			United States	Romantic Comedy
A Swingin' Summer			United States	
That Darn Cat!			United States	
That Funny Feeling			United States	Romantic Comedy
A Thousand Clowns			United States	Comedy-Drama
Tickle Me			United States	Musical/Western Comedy
A Very Special Favor			United States	Romantic Comedy
What's New Pussycat?			United States	
Wild on the Beach			United States	
Winter A-Go-Go			United States	Comedy-Drama
Zebra in the Kitchen			United States	
Carry On Cleo			United Kingdom	
Help!			United Kingdom	Musical Comedy
The Big Job			United Kingdom	
Those Magnificent Men in Their Flying Machines			United Kingdom	
You Must Be Joking!			United Kingdom	
1966
After the Fox			United Kingdom; Italy	
Any Wednesday			United States	Romantic Comedy
Birds Do It			United States	
Blindfold			United States	Romantic Comedy
Boy, Did I Get a Wrong Number!			United States	
Don't Worry, We'll Think of a Title			United States	
Dr. Goldfoot and the Girl Bombs			United States	
The Fat Spy			United States	
A Fine Madness			United States	Comedy-Drama
Follow Me, Boys!			United States	Comedy-Drama
The Fortune Cookie			United States	
Frankie and Johnny			United States	
A Funny Thing Happened on the Way to the Forum			United States	Musical Comedy
Gambit			United States	
The Ghost and Mr. Chicken			United States	Horror Comedy
The Glass Bottom Boat			United States	Romantic Comedy
How to Steal a Million			United States	
The Las Vegas Hillbillys			United States	
The Last of the Secret Agents?			United States	
Let's Kill Uncle			United States	
Lord Love a Duck			United States	Comedy-Drama
Mad in Paris			United States	Romantic Comedy
Munster, Go Home!			United States	
Murderers' Row			United States	
Not with My Wife, You Don't!			United States	
Our Man Flint			United States	Parody film
Out of Sight			United States	
The Pad (and How to Use It)			United States	
Paradise, Hawaiian Style			United States	Musical Comedy
Penelope			United States	
The Russians Are Coming, the Russians Are Coming			United States	
The Silencers			United States	
Spinout			United States	Musical Comedy
Texas Across the River			United States	Western Comedy
The Trouble with Angels			United States	Comedy-Drama
Three on a Couch			United States	
The Ugly Dachshund			United States	
The Unkissed Bride			United States	
Walk Don't Run			United States	
Way... Way Out			United States	
What's Up, Tiger Lily?			United States	
What Did You Do in the War, Daddy?			United States	
Wild Wild Winter			United States	
You're a Big Boy Now			United States	
Alfie			United Kingdom	Comedy-Drama
Doctor in Clover			United Kingdom	
Morgan!			United Kingdom	
The Great St. Trinian's Train Robbery			United Kingdom	
The Sandwich Man			United Kingdom	
The Spy with a Cold Nose			United Kingdom	
The Wrong Box			United Kingdom	
1967
The Adventures of Bullwhip Griffin			United States	Western Comedy
The Ambushers			United States	
The Ballad of Josie			United States	Western Comedy
Barefoot in the Park			United States	Romantic Comedy
The Big Mouth			United States	
Bikini Paradise			United States	
The Busy Body			United States	
The Caper of the Golden Bulls			United States	Action Comedy
Caprice			United States	Thriller/Comedy
Casino Royale			United States	
Catalina Caper			United States	Musical/Mystery Comedy
David Holzman's Diary			United States	
Divorce American Style			United States	
Don't Make Waves			United States	
Easy Come, Easy Go			United States	Musical Comedy
Eight on the Lam			United States	
Enter Laughing			United States	
The Fastest Guitar Alive			United States	Western/Musical Comedy
The Flim-Flam Man			United States	
Fitzwilly			United States	
Good Times			United States	Musical Comedy
The Gnome-Mobile			United States	Musical/Fantasy Comedy
The Graduate			United States	Comedy-Drama
Guess Who's Coming to Dinner			United States	Romantic Comedy-Drama
The Happening			United States	
How to Succeed in Business Without Really Trying			United States	Musical/Romantic Comedy-Drama
In Like Flint			United States	
It's a Bikini World			United States	Musical Comedy
Luv			United States	
Mars Needs Women			United States	
Monkeys, Go Home!			United States	
The Perils of Pauline			United States	
The President's Analyst			United States	
The Reluctant Astronaut			United States	
Rosie!			United States	
The Tiger Makes Out			United States	
Three Bites of the Apple			United States	Romantic Comedy
Who's Minding the Mint?			United States	
The Gruesome Twosome			United States	Comedy horror
Bedazzled			United Kingdom	
The Bobo			United Kingdom	
The Plank			United Kingdom	
The Fearless Vampire Killers			United States; United Kingdom	Horror Comedy
1968
Blackbeard's Ghost			United States	Fantasy Comedy
Buona Sera, Mrs. Campbell			United States	
Bye Bye Braverman			United States	
Candy			United States	
Chitty Chitty Bang Bang			United States	Musical Fantasy Comedy
Did You Hear the One About the Traveling Saleslady?			United States	
Don't Just Stand There!			United States	
Don't Raise the Bridge, Lower the River			United Kingdom	
A Flea in Her Ear			United States	
For Love of Ivy			United States	Romantic Comedy
Funny Girl			United States	Biography Musical Comedy
Greetings			United States	
The Horse in the Gray Flannel Suit			United States	
How Sweet It Is!			United States	
How to Save a Marriage and Ruin Your Life			United States	Romantic Comedy
I Love You, Alice B. Toklas			United States	Musical Comedy
The Impossible Years			United States	
Inspector Clouseau			United States	
Live a Little, Love a Little			United States	Musical Comedy
Never a Dull Moment			United States	
The Night They Raided Minsky's			United States	Musical Comedy
Nobody's Perfect			United States	
The Odd Couple			United States	
Paper Lion			United States	
The Private Navy of Sgt. O'Farrell			United States	
The Producers			United States	
The Secret Life of an American Wife			United States	
The Secret War of Harry Frigg			United States	
The Shakiest Gun in the West			United States	Western Comedy
Skidoo			United States	
Stay Away, Joe			United States	Western Comedy
What's So Bad About Feeling Good?			United States	Fantasy Comedy
Where Angels Go, Trouble Follows			United States	
Where Were You When the Lights Went Out?			United States	
The Wicked Dreams of Paula Schultz			United States	
With Six You Get Eggroll			United States	Romantic Comedy
Yours, Mine and Ours			United States	
Carry On Up the Khyber			United Kingdom	
1969
Angel in My Pocket			United States	
The April Fools			United States	Romantic Comedy
The Best House in London			United Kingdom	
Bob & Carol & Ted & Alice			United States	Comedy-Drama
Cactus Flower			United States	
The Comic			United States	Comedy-Drama
Don't Drink the Water			United States	
Hello, Dolly!			United States	Musical/Romantic Comedy
Hook, Line & Sinker			United States	
The Italian Job			United Kingdom	
The Love Bug			United States	
The Magic Christian			United Kingdom	
Otley			United Kingdom	
Putney Swope			United States	
The Reivers			United States	
Support Your Local Sheriff!			United States	Western Comedy
Take the Money and Run			United States	
The Trouble with Girls			United States	
The Wrecking Crew			United States	
