= Home (1988 TV program) =

- Also known as: The Home Show
- Genre: Talk show
- Starring: Robb Weller; Sandy Hill; Nancy Dussault; Gary Collins; Cristina Ferrare; Dana Fleming; Beth Ruyak; Hanala Stadner; Sarah Purcell
- Country of origin: United States
- Original language: English

Production
- Running time: 30 minutes (1988-1989); 60 minutes (1989-1991, 1992-1994); 90 minutes (1991-1992)
- Production companies: Woody Fraser Productions; Reeves Entertainment (seasons 1-6); MCEG Sterling Entertainment (season 7)

Original release
- Network: ABC
- Release: January 18, 1988 – April 8, 1994

Home, also referred to as The Home Show, is a daytime informational talk show that aired on ABC from January 18, 1988 to April 8, 1994.

The program was co-hosted by Robb Weller with Sandy Hill and Nancy Dussault rotating as co-hosts during the first season. Gary Collins hosted the show for the remainder of its run. Co-hosts included Cristina Ferrare, Dana Fleming, Beth Ruyak and Sarah Purcell.

The show featured several regular contributors:

- Fitness expert – Hanala Sagal
- Interior design and craft – Sally Marshall, Dian Thomas, Carol Duvall, and Kitty Bartholomew
- Technology – Marc Summers and Wil Shriner
- Medical expert – Art Ulene
- Handyman – Al Carell

The show's various directors were Arthur Forrest (who directed the pilot), Booey Kober, Bob Loudin, Jerry Kupcinet, Paul Forrest, and Bob Levy.

Mother Love joined the show as the announcer in the final season, replacing Bob Hilton.

== Broadcast history ==
The series began as a half-hour program on January 18, 1988; reruns of Mr. Belvedere filled the four-month long gap between the cancelation of game show Bargain Hunters and the premiere of Home. After a 60-minute trial run in September 1988, it expanded permanently to an hour in January 1989 (upon the cancellation of Ryan's Hope), with reruns of Growing Pains moving from 11:00 a.m. to noon Eastern Time. However, some affiliates elected to only carry one half-hour of the program (this practice would carry over later to its successor, Mike and Maty). Home later expanded to 90 minutes and took over the noon slot once Match Game was canceled in 1991. The show reverted to 60 minutes in 1992, after the network officially abandoned the noon time slot to give that half-hour back to local affiliates, which in most cases, preempted the final half-hour in favor of local news.

The series was set to be cancelled in 1993, but this decision was reversed after ABC affiliates expressed dissatisfaction with its planned replacement, the importation of The Shirley Show from Canada's CTV, hosted by Shirley Solomon (which would later find a home in American syndication). Several stations, however, eventually placed the series in late night timeslots due to ratings issues or giving priority to local lifestyle or talk shows, such as the (City)'s Talking format seen on several ABC affiliates owned by Hearst Television.

On September 24, 1993, as part of a flu prevention segment, Burbank-based physician Dr. Edward Gilbert gave flu shots to the co-hosts live on-air to encourage getting vaccinated for that season's variant. Gilbert, nervous during his first-ever television appearance, inadvertently administered Collins and Purcell's shots using the same syringe, not realizing his gaffe until just after administering Purcell's vaccine. Afraid the re-used and shared needle might have transmitted a disease between the two hosts, Collins underwent testing for HIV and hepatitis immediately after taping the broadcast as a precautionary measure, testing negative for both diseases.

On March 9, 1994, ABC's director of broadcast standards and practices, Susan Futterman, ordered the censorship of on-air remarks by pediatrician Dr. Jay Gordon in which Gordon warned about the marketing of drugs and alcohol to children. Gordon attributed the decision to Futterman. Executive producer Woody Fraser initially overrode the censorship, though the two had recurring disputes over editorial standards throughout the series' run. Fraser told the Los Angeles Times that content decisions on Home were shaped by its commercial relationships: "Susan Futterman never says to you directly it has anything to do with potential sponsor problems, but the Home show is considered to be an advertiser-friendly show. So we sell a lot of spots. We make a lot of money for the network."

Notwithstanding the temporary reprieve due to the network passing on Shirley, Home aired its last broadcast on April 8, 1994; its time slot would be taken over three days later by Mike and Maty, occupying the hour until its final broadcast on June 7, 1996, to be replaced on June 10 of that year by Caryl & Marilyn: Real Friends. After only a year, the latter series (following a nearly 2 1/2-month run of repeats) was replaced on August 11, 1997 by The View, which occupies the time slot to this day and eventually gained back all clearance from the network's affiliates at its proper time.

All times Eastern Time Zone

- January 1988 – September 1988, 11:30am–12:00pm
- September 1988, 11:00am–12:00pm
- September 1988 – January 1989, 11:30am–12:00pm
- January 1989 – July 1991, 11:00am–12:00pm
- July 1991 – August 1992, 11:00am–12:30pm
- August 1992 – April 1994, 11:00am–12:00pm

== Hosts ==
- Robb Weller (1988-1989)
- Sandy Hill or Nancy Dussault (1988-1989)
- Cristina Ferrare (1989)
- Gary Collins (1989-1994)
- Dana Fleming (1990-1991)
- Beth Ruyak (1991-1992)
- Sarah Purcell (1992-1994)
