= Jeanne Arnold =

Jeanne Arnold may refer to

- Jeanne Arnold (actress) (1921–1996), an American actress and singer
- Jeanne Arnold (archaeologist) (19??–2022), an American archaeologist who taught in the anthropology department at the University of California
