= Broadcast Standards and Practices =

Department in US television networks

In the United States, Standards and Practices (also referred to as Broadcast Standards and Practices or BS&P for short) is the name traditionally given to the department at a television network which is responsible for the moral, ethical, and legal implications of the program that the network airs. Standards and Practices also ensure fairness on televised game shows, in which they are the adjunct to the judges at the production company level. They also have the power to reprimand and recommend the termination of television network stars and employees for violations of standards and practices, performing the same role as that of an organizational ombudsman in other media industries, balancing the needs and requirements of the broadcaster, the creators, the viewing audience, and governmental authority in various federal bureaus.

== Examples of intervention ==
- The Standards and Practices department of NBC censored one of Jack Paar's jokes on the February 10, 1960, episode of The Tonight Show.

An English lady is visiting Switzerland. She asks about the location of the "W.C." The Swiss, thinking she is referring to the "Wayside Chapel", leaves her a note that said (in part) "the W.C. is situated nine miles from the room that you will occupy...It is capable of holding about 229 people and it is only open on Sunday and Thursday...It may interest you to know that my daughter was married in the W.C. and it was there that she met her husband...I shall be delighted to reserve the best seat for you, if you wish, where you will be seen by everyone."

Paar was so very taken aback by the network's decision to censor the joke, he walked off the live show the very next day. As he left his desk in the middle of the program, he said, "I am leaving The Tonight Show. There must be a better way of, uh, making a living than this." Paar reappeared on March 7, 1960, strolled on stage, struck a pose, and said, "As I was saying before I was interrupted ..." After the audience erupted in applause, Paar continued, "When I walked off, I said there must be a better way of making a living. Well, I've looked ... and there isn't." He then went on to explain his departure with typical frankness: "Leaving the show was a childish and perhaps emotional thing. I have been guilty of such action in the past and will perhaps be again. I'm totally unable to hide what I feel. It is not an asset in show business, but I shall do the best I can to amuse and entertain you and let other people speak freely, as I have in the past."

- During the production of Galactica 1980, Susan Futterman of ABC's broadcast standards department ruled that jokes referencing a fictional food called "Arnie's meatballs" were lewd. Rather than removing the references, executive producer Glen A. Larson incorporated additional references into the two-part episode "The Night the Cylons Landed," multiplying the content the department had sought to restrict. According to story editor Allan Cole, the decision was a direct and deliberate response to the ruling.
- In March 1994, ABC's broadcast standards department censored on-air remarks by pediatrician Dr. Jay Gordon on the daytime talk show Home, in which Gordon warned about the marketing of drugs and alcohol to children. The segment was scheduled for the March 9 broadcast. Home executive producer Woody Fraser publicly attributed the decision to commercial rather than editorial considerations: "Susan Futterman never says to you directly it has anything to do with potential sponsor problems, but the Home show is considered to be an advertiser-friendly show. So we sell a lot of spots. We make a lot of money for the network."
- Prior to filming the 2007 double-episode "The Gang Gets Whacked" of It's Always Sunny in Philadelphia, the network FX banned the actors from miming snorting cocaine or snorting another substance, but rather would be allowed to place the drug against their gums.

=== Animation ===
- In the late 1970s, ABC created a new position within its broadcast standards department specifically dedicated to children's programming and hired Susan Futterman to fill it — a role the network had not previously had. Among her early decisions were the removal of Bugs Bunny and Road Runner cartoons from the network's Saturday morning schedule and the refusal to carry Tom and Jerry, citing excessive violence. Both continued to air on competing networks at high ratings during the same period.
- X-Men: The Animated Series was heavily influenced by Fox Kids's BS&P, with characters not allowed to either come into mortal danger (save for Morph's presumed death) or engage in hand-to-hand combat.
- The CGI series ReBoot was heavily censored by ABC during its two-season run on the network. The network announced the show would be cancelled after its second season after it was purchased by The Walt Disney Company, which would make way for a schedule of all Disney-produced series. The writers wrote scripts for episodes that mocked ABC's S&P department due to it being cancelled, including the insertion of unnoticed profanity within a stream of binary numbers. ReBoot went on to produce another successful season and two made-for-TV movies on other networks which had less strict S&P departments and content standards.
- Episode 97 of Teenage Mutant Ninja Turtles (2003) was unaired in the United States until 2015 due to pressures from Fox Broadcast & Standards (although 4Kids Entertainment leased the time from the network for their FoxBox block and aired the series, it still had to meet Fox's broadcast standards). On the official TMNT website, Lloyd Goldfine states:

The final edited and mixed version of the notorious "Insane in the Membrane" was deemed unsuitable for air by Fox Broadcast Standards and Practices. Apparently, in between the time the episode was written, storyboarded, animated and edited (all stages approved by Fox BS&P), and the time the show was mixed for air, there was a change of personnel in the Fox BS&P offices, and no one involved in the original approvals was still employed at Fox. Upon seeing the episode, they were said to be "horrified" and that there was no way they could air the episode. I'm not sure I disagree with them—had there been BS&P comments earlier in the process, we certainly would have handled the show differently. But as it was approved at every stage, we went full steam ahead. In the end, I was told it was bad judgment on my part... so there you have it. I believe this episode will eventually be available, but plans have not been finalized.

The episode finally aired in the United States on August 2, 2015 on Nicktoons after Paramount purchased the rights to the TMNT franchise.

Cartoon Network and its Adult Swim programming block has had various instances of publicly disclosed Standards and Practices encounters:

- The final three episodes of the first season of Moral Orel were held back for various amounts of time by Standards and Practices due to being too dark and over the top sexually crude even for Adult Swim, despite regularly originating TV-MA content. Another episode entitled "God's Chef" was delayed for months before the Adult Swim network was able to show it. It has since been released uncensored, along with the rest of Season 1 and part of Season 2, on DVD.
- Adult Swim programming director Kim Manning revealed in the network's now-defunct online message boards that Adult Swim inquired into airing Elfen Lied in April 2006, but was rejected by its Standards and Practices department because the series contained graphic violence and nudity. The only way the department would approve its airing was to have it extensively edited, so the network ultimately decided not to broadcast at the expense of altering the original work at such a level. Manning stated in the same post that this was also the case with Gantz.
- In 2014, according to Rebecca Sugar, the creator of Steven Universe, Cartoon Network Standards and Practices Department informed her that Ruby and Sapphire, who fused together as Garnet, couldn't "kiss on the mouth." Even though, after March 2015, following the release of "Jail Break", fans picked up on the relationship between Ruby and Sapphire, and Pearl's love for Rose Quartz, the show's crew were prohibited from confirming these relationships. Sugar noted that, when she pitched the episode that would become "Reunited" in 2015, she was told that the International Standards and Practices Department of Cartoon Network might object to language about Garnet, and she pushed back more after Ian Jones-Quartey proposed to her. Sugar also noted that a signing card she would give out at San Diego Comic-Con in 2015 was deemed "too romantic", because some at Cartoon Network might become "upset" with the direction of the show. She also noted that after the September 2016 publication of The Answer, a children's book adaptation of the episode "The Answer", she was brought into a meeting and "asked to explain herself", noting that she would, in meetings like this, defend the show's stories and "audience of queer youth".

In June 2021, Abbey White of Insider argued that one of the reasons that children's animation were stymied in their attempts to be more inclusive for decades was due to Standards and Practices departments within networks, the latter which interpreted rating guidelines and definitions of profanity, indecency, and obscenity by the FCC, to guide their notes to crew working on various animated series. One former Cartoon Network executive quoted in the story, Katie Krentz, told the publication that these departments have "wide-ranging content guidelines" on hand, which regulate just about everything, "from characters' technology use to their diet." White noted that these departments, as do studio executives, determine whether words such as "pride" or "gay," or other LGBTQ terms, can be shown on onscreen or said by a character. According to White, this included an unnamed Cartoon Network series in the mid-2010s where writers had to refer to a character's same-gender parents singularly as "Mom" rather than "Moms." Even so, the story said that while these departments have a huge sway, the conservative pushback to certain shows have led to the removal of content, and said that top executives have the power to make changes to increase inclusion. Although streaming companies do not have such departments, Krentz argued that, as a result, decisions about LGBT representation in a show falls on the "belief system and background" of a single person, putting pressure on creative executives.

== Game show incidents ==
Resulting from the 1950s quiz show scandals, game shows have been closely monitored by network standards and practices departments for possible irregularities. Subsequent to the quiz show scandals, a detailed document is prepared for each show by the show's producers, which sets forth the exact rules of the game. This document is referred to as the "bible". The bible is then used as the definitive authority regarding game play. The contestant release form, which is executed by all contestants, contains language to the effect that decisions of the producer shall be final.

When an irregularity occurs, the most common remedy is to permit the contestant to appear and play the game again at a later date. Disclaimers are also a regular part of a closing credits roll, stating that dead portions of the game which had no ramifications were edited for time to meet final cut, and points/money are added/subtracted for a successful appeal of the correctness of an answer.

=== The Price Is Right ===
On rare occasions, contestants who have lost games because of procedural irregularities have been awarded the prizes. Irregularities have occurred when either the prize descriptions or prices displayed for the item in question have been incorrect, mechanical errors/malfunctions with certain pricing game props, or administrative errors by models, announcer, or the host (such as a misheard bid, models not doing what the contestant requested, or announcing the price of a prize when it was not supposed to be there). When such an error occurs, the contestant is awarded any prizes in question. If the error is discovered before the ensuing Showcase Showdown (on hour shows prior to 2024) or the conclusion of the sixth pricing game (since 2024 because of a procedural change where both Showcase Showdowns are recorded after the sixth pricing game), the host informs the contestant upon returning from commercial or before the Showdown, and the contestant is re-seeded for the Showcase Showdown based on the additional winnings. If the error is discovered after the ensuing Showcase Showdown or in post-production, either a disclaimer appears or is read by the announcer during the closing credits of the show.

If a contestant is discovered to be ineligible, the ineligible contestant will forfeit all prizes, and likewise a disclaimer appears or a statement is read by the announcer at the end of the show. If the ineligible contestant is found to have won a One Bid, the contestants on Contestants' Row at the time the ineligible contestant was playing and did not win a One Bid are entitled to return to the show immediately once the infraction is discovered, per game show regulations, as their appearance was compromised by an ineligible contestant, pursuant to all game show regulations. The ten-year rule (in which a contestant that gets called up on stage during the show may return if their last appearance on the show was at least 10 years to the day of airing) imposed in 2007 will not be in effect if a contestant lost a One Bid to an ineligible contestant and did not win a further One Bid during that episode.

One of the contestants on the original September 6, 1972 episode (the third show overall) was the common-law wife of a cameraman, and therefore ineligible to appear on any CBS game show. The episode never aired, but the other winners kept their prizes (a replacement show was taped and aired in its place).

Since Season 34 (September 2005), episodes may be delayed (but cannot be cancelled) because of crises beyond CBS or RTL Group control. A December 2004 episode was rebroadcast on September 8, 2005, where a featured prize was a trip to New Orleans. While trips to New Orleans and other tourism-based cities are common prizes on the show, the repeat aired less than two weeks following the city's destruction by Hurricane Katrina and many viewers found it tactless for CBS to air the episode; network executives quickly caught the mistake and pulled the episode from West Coast airings before its scheduled start time in those markets. During the investigation into the matter, CBS subsequently pulled two episodes that were taped in June (3342K) and July 2005 (3371K) which also featured trips to New Orleans (one of which was in the Showcase; both were won by their respective contestants) and aired them at the end of the season in late May and early June 2006, as the city's recovery from Katrina had progressed. Each such episode aired at the end of the season with a statement from either of Louisiana's two senators. Other contestants on the shows were offered their prizes shortly after the postponement was announced and a DVD was sent to each contestant.

A rule change in Season 48 (March 2020) allows trips to be taken within two years of broadcast, or later if government regulations necessitate, which was first officially posted during the Season 49 premiere in October 2020. CBS first used the new rule for Episode #9071K in March 2020 when a contestant had won a trip to the NCAA Final Four in Atlanta that was scrubbed days prior to broadcast (while CBS was not the broadcaster of the Final Four that year, they broadcast other rounds of the NCAA Tournament, and the network's game shows and daytime dramas are pre-empted for first-round games). Since CBS sponsored the prize (as trips to the Super Bowl or Final Four are sponsored by CBS as part of their rights deals), they could either pay a cash substitute or offer the contestant a trip to a future Final Four, which would have been to Indianapolis in 2021 (which the NCAA would have disallowed because of spectator restrictions still in effect) or to New Orleans in 2022. Similarly, a trip to the 2020 Stanley Cup Final offered on the April 15, 2020 episode was replaced with cash in the amount of the trip.

The 2023 Turkey–Syria earthquakes occurred on February 5, with the first tremor at 8:17 PM EST (5:17 PM PST), and a second tremor on February 6 at 5:24 AM EST (2:24 AM PST). Episode 0102L, which was scheduled to be broadcast 35 hours after the first earthquake on February 7, 2023, was pulled shortly after the news reports since the sixth pricing game had featured a trip to Istanbul, although it was unaffected by the earthquake as it is over 1,000 kilometres (620 mi) from Nurdağı, where the fault line was located. CBS pulled the broadcast, and delayed the broadcast indefinitely as Turkey was recovering. On the intended rescheduled broadcast date in August 2023, CBS was forced again to postpone because of Maui wildfires. The episode was burned off on November 24, 2023, in Season 52, but officially a Season 51 episode, the last Barker Studio broadcast. The same procedure was done where non-trip prizes offered were awarded based on the intended broadcast date. Trip prizes were governed by the 2020 rule change.

Multiple Season 53 episodes took more than one calendar year from taping to broadcast, all caused by Hurricane Helene. Episode 0744L, recorded on June 7, 2024, was scheduled for an October 25, 2024 broadcast and featured a vacation to Hendersonville, North Carolina sponsored by the Echo Mountain Inn as the prize in the fifth pricing game. The bed and breakfast was damaged by the storm on the month of intended broadcast. The broadcast was rescheduled to July 2, 2025, 390 days after taping. Episode 0774L, recorded on May 23, 2024, and scheduled for a November 15, 2024 broadcast, featured a trip to Asheville, North Carolina sponsored by the Princess Anne Inn in the Showcase, also affected by the storm. That episode was broadcast on August 7, 2025, 441 days after taping. CBS, RTL Group, and both sponsors agreed to the rebroadcast dates.

In a playing of Plinko taped July 22, 2008, a prop official forgot to remove a fishing line used in the taping of a previous promotion for the official Ludia video game (which guided the chip into a confined pattern leading into the $10,000 channel) before having it readied for game play. A contestant won $30,000 before the mistake was discovered by Associate Producer Adam Sandler (who is now the show's lead producer; not to be confused with the actor). The game was repaired by having the line removed, and the contestant started at $0. The contestant was allowed to keep the $30,000 because of the violation of procedure, plus the money won during the actual game; however, the $30,000 did not count towards the contestant's cumulative winnings on the show.

During a September 22, 2008 taping, contestant Terry Kneiss made a perfect Showcase bid. CBS Standards and Practices, host Drew Carey, and producer Kathy Greco became highly suspicious that another party in the studio audience had supplied Kneiss with the bid, which then resulted in taping being stopped while an investigation took place. Although the contestant was ultimately awarded the prizes, the show's air date was moved back from its original schedule. As a result of the incident, the show changed its practice regarding prizes, adding up to 30 new prizes which began appearing each taping week. Carey wrote on his blog before the 2009 season premiere that with so few prizes being offered, "It was possible, if one wanted, to watch the show for a while and memorize the price of almost every prize we offered." The show wanted to prevent a situation similar to 1984 Press Your Luck incident where contestant Michael Larson memorized the board's light pattern to land on the largest cash value space which offered an additional spin and was able to avoid a space with the show's signature villain, which served as a bankrupt space which would result in the forfeit of his winnings.

Since 2009, CBS Standards and Practices also requires a disclaimer mentioning Drew Carey's minority ownership of the MLS club Seattle Sounders FC any time a prize features Sounders game tickets, if a Sounders player makes an appearance to present a prize on the show, a contestant wears a Sounders shirt, or the club and its players are mentioned by the host or contestant. If a Sounders prize package is offered in a One Bid, pricing game or in the Showcase, Carey must also mention on-air his ownership stake during the bidding. Disclaimers may also be run if other MLS club kits are worn on-air.

In one instance, the host admitted to an error and it was reviewed by them and a staff member immediately. During the January 30, 2017 episode, a contestant played the Clock Game. Host Drew Carey made a mistake in giving "higher" and "lower" after the contestant's bids. Carey admitted to the mistake after the first prize was correctly guessed, then shown discussing the infraction with a camera operator. Instant replay review was called by officials, which led to six additional seconds added to the remaining time based on his mistake. The contestant won the second prize, and an additional bonus prize, with one second remaining after the adjustment.

In one situation, a theme week with rule changes caused a Standards and Practices violation. On April 23, 2013, during Big Money Week, a contestant played Grand Game for $100,000 instead of the normal prize of $10,000. The contestant lost at the third guess, which normally is $100, but was $1,000 for Big Money Week. When a contestant has three successful guesses, the contestant is asked if they are to risk their $1,000 for $10,000, but if they are wrong, they lose everything. If a contestant has one or two successful guesses, the wrong answer denotes the contestant retains what they had won in the game. The board operator flipped the game board to show loss at $1,000, where the game board displays 0 (Gas Money displays "0000" when a contestant loses the game; Grand Game displays 0 only if the contestant gambles and misses on the fourth guess). At the ensuing Showcase Showdown, host Drew Carey informed the contestant the official committed a Standards and Practices violation, and the contestant won $1,000, as was prescribed in the rules for two correct guesses but missing on the third (since the game started at $10 instead of $1 for this playing).

On an episode airing December 26, 2023, announcer George Gray accidentally revealed the price of a Nissan Frontier truck in his prize copy before Switcheroo, which is a game where the contestant is intended to guess the price of five different prizes, including the truck. The noise in the audience drowned out the accidental price reveal. Audience members who heard the price revealed assisted the contestant to win the truck, which would likely have been awarded had he lost the game because of a standards and practices violation by the announcer (similar to a situation where a model accidentally revealed the price of a car in Five Price Tags, in which the contestant automatically won the car).

Also, in compliance with Standards and Practices since the move to Haven Studios, audience attendance restrictions are now implemented as multiple shows are now taped in one day. One taping may offer prizes used in previous tapings that day (Season 52) or will be used in subsequent tapings that day (Season 53). That taping is restricted where in Season 52, no audience member from the two morning tapings could attend the late taping, or in Season 53, no audience member of the early taping can attend the middle or late taping.

=== Other game shows ===
Contestants on other game shows, such as Jeopardy! and Who Wants to Be a Millionaire?, have been brought back on later episodes after a judging error or an error related to question material had been discovered. Other contestants have had prize money awarded despite not seeing their episodes air due to circumstances beyond theirs or the show's control.

==== The Money Drop ====
On December 20, 2010, Million Dollar Money Drop contestants Gabe Okoye and Brittany Mayi lost $800,000 on a bad question:

- Which of these was sold in stores first?
1. Macintosh Computer
2. Sony Walkman
3. Post-it notes

They decided to risk $800,000 on the Post-it notes. According to the show, the Post-it notes were first sold in 1980 and the Walkman was first sold in 1979. The answer was flawed after Internet research indicated that the Post-its were first tested for sale in four cities in 1977 before their nationwide introduction in 1980. In a statement by executive producer Jeff Apploff, the information obtained by the show's research department was incomplete. Due to this research error, Gabe and Brittany were originally going to be invited back for a second chance to play the game, even though their question was not the deciding question in their game. The show was canceled before that could happen. A similar situation happened on the UK version in October 2010 on a Doctor Who question. (By rule, producers could have compensated the affected players.)

==== Press Your Luck ====
In an episode of Press Your Luck, the three players were asked a question regarding which cartoon character used the phrase "sufferin' succotash!" After the first contestant buzzed in with the answer "Sylvester", host Peter Tomarken gave two other choices of Goofy and Daffy Duck. The other two contestants all went with Sylvester, but Tomarken said the correct answer was Daffy Duck. In actuality, both Sylvester and Daffy Duck have said the phrase. During post-production of the episode the error was discovered and a taped segment, in which Tomarken got a "phone call" from Looney Tunes voice actor Mel Blanc (in the voice of Sylvester), explained the mistake and that all three contestants would be invited back on future episodes.

=== Sony Pictures Television game shows ===
These are incidents with the three game shows from Sony Pictures Television, Jeopardy!, Wheel of Fortune, and Who Wants to be a Millionaire (the last part of Sony since 2008).

- Standards and Practices will adjudicate special disclaimers broadcast in unique cases.
  - An answer will have a different correct question when the show was recorded compared to the time the show airs. During the 2014 summer Jeopardy! Teen Tournament first round match: the answer in the $400 clue in the My Present Government Job category in the Jeopardy! round was, "Kathleen Sebelius, Insuring America, one person at a time." The correct response was "What is the Secretary of Health and Human Services?" However, she had resigned from that position in April 2014, between the taping of the match in March 2014 and the July 22, 2014 broadcast. The show posted a disclaimer, "Recorded in March 2014," as the category was being read.
  - Current events between taping may also require the disclaimer. The death of Paul Walker occurred on November 30, 2013. The ensuing Monday (December 2, 2013), an episode of Wheel of Fortune filmed October 4, 2013 featured the toss-up puzzle "The Fast and the Furious" (the movie franchise which he played Brian O'Conner). Viewers complained to Sony about sensitivity in the wake of Walker's death days prior. Although the show is taped in advance, with no returning champions, Sony had already posted on Wheel's Web site that week's players and since the episode had been sent to the program's affiliates, it was impossible to pull the episode since each week's episodes are themed, and the themes are sent in advance after post production is finished. That night, Sony posted on Twitter condolences to the Walker family and a note of the program recording date.
  - The 2022 Russian invasion of Ukraine has affected Jeopardy! On March 4, 2022, days after the invasion, the quiz show broadcast the following answer: "The Kerch Strait -- Along with Serious Border Issues -- Separates Russia From This Country on The Black Sea." The correct question was "What is Ukraine?" Sony added to the broadcast when it was being sent, "Recorded on January 11, 2022," and posted on Twitter the date of recording before broadcast. Similarly, on the Polish version in 2022 (which has a Sony Pictures Television copyright and is legally governed by United States rules as the broadcast belongs to Sony in Culver City, not TVP in Warsaw), a player's misspelling of Volodymyr Zelenskyy in Final Jeopardy! was ruled incorrect for the answer, "On February 25, 2022, he said he needed ammunition, not a ride".
- In 1999, a Jeopardy! contestant who lost on a Jeopardy! Teen Tournament game on a questionable ruling during Final Jeopardy! was ordered to be brought back for the 2000 College Championship.
- In 2026, a Jeopardy! Champions Wildcard tournament featured an infraction when Stella Trout made a $11,200 wager on a Daily Double in the category Making Conservation. The answer was, "Within the Department of the Interior, this is the country's oldest conservation agency". Trout responded, "What is the National Park Service?", founded in 1916, which was ruled wrong (United States Fish and Wildlife Service, formed in 1940 by mergers but originally the United States Commission on Fish and Fisheries, founded in 1871, was ruled correct). Trout lost the Champions Wildcard tournament because of that infraction, because if she was ruled correct, she would have won the tournament. As the taping of the Champions Wildcard is taped prior to the Jeopardy! Honors, which is the night before Tournament of Champions tapings, Trout will be part of the Season 43 Tournament of Champions in February 2027.
- The September 11 through September 14, 2001 episodes of Jeopardy! aired only on a few stations in the United States due to continuous breaking news coverage of the September 11 attacks wholesale pre-empting the show throughout the United States and Canada outside of a few non-news carrying independent stations airing it. As Jeopardy! has rules where the funds for the cash prizes won by contestants on the series are only issued a set period after the episode has aired (and where the show's confidentiality agreement regarding the results of a game has not been breached), the program's Standards and Practices had to issue a one-time exception for those contestants (along with others who had won cash and prizes on sister series Wheel of Fortune on the same airdates [which also has the same policy regarding the timing of the awarding of cash and prizes]) due to the extraordinary circumstance where the results were unseen until cycled into the show's weekend rerun feed or aired on Game Show Network years later, while the four Wheel episodes aired in the Washington area late night Sunday, September 16, 2001, on WJLA-TV in a two-hour block.
- A January 30, 2008 episode of Jeopardy! resulted in Arianna Kelly being brought back on an episode on July 8, 2008, when officials found questionable calls during game play against her during that episode.
- In 2001, Who Wants to Be a Millionaire? contestant Ed Toutant was given the following question:

$16,000 (9 out of 15) - No time limit

Scientists in England recently altered what vegetable so it glows when it needs water?

1. Potato(correct answer)
2. Tomato(chosen; incorrect answer)
3. Cabbage
4. Carrots
  - Toutant selected Tomato, but the show said it was Potato. It was later found the answer was flawed after further research from Marc Knight, a professor at Oxford University Department of Plant Sciences. The glowing potato was, in fact, developed in Scotland; however, Knight had developed a glowing tomato in England. Therefore, Toutant's answer of tomato was correct. The $860,000 Skins Game jackpot was in use at the time, and he was allowed to play for the million and the skins game jackpot, which he eventually won.
- Patrick Hugh won $1,000 during a Season 7 (syndicated) episode, but a critical word in his $25,000 question was found to be misspelled. He was given the option of being awarded $25,000 "no questions asked" or to forfeit his winnings and return to the show and begin his game with a new $25,000 question with all four of his lifelines reinstated. Hugh chose the latter option, used two lifelines (Ask the Audience/Double-Dip) to correctly answer his new $25,000 question, and missed the $50,000 question after using his Phone-a-Friend and Ask-the-Expert lifelines, so he left with $25,000 this time.

== In other countries ==
- In the Philippines, the term network ombudsman (also referred to as office of the network ombudsman) is used for this department.
