= Richard Tyler (designer) =

Australian fashion designer

- Born: 22 September 1947 (age 78); Sunshine, Victoria, Australia
- Occupation: Fashion Designer
- Years active: 1960s–1990s

Richard Tyler (born 22 September 1947) is an Australian fashion designer.

== Early life ==
Tyler was born in the suburb of Sunshine in Melbourne (Australia). His mother, Topsie Tyler, was a steamstress who taught him to sew and tailor. In his teens, he worked as an apprentice pattern cutter.

== Career ==
Tyler began dressing musicians and other celebrities in the 1960s, including singer Billy Thorpe and Countdown host Molly Meldrum. In 1978, Tyler designed The Wiz press tour wardrobe for singer Diana Ross. In 1988, he opened the Tyler Trafficante boutique on Beverly Boulevard with Lisa Trafficante, who he married the following year. He was subsequently hired as head designer at Anne Klein.

Tyler won three awards from the Council of Fashion Designers of America, including "best new talent" in 1993 and Women's Wear Designer of the Year in 1994. He also won a Michelangelo Shoe Award. Among the celebrities who have dressed in Tyler's designs are Anjelica Huston, Julia Roberts, Diane Keaton, Dodi Fayed, Annie Flanders, Lou Adler, Daryl Hannah, Jack Nicholson, Felicity Huffman, and Marcia Cross.

As of 2025, Tyler is not active in fashion design.

=== In media ===
In the 1990s, Tyler's workshop was featured in an episode of Behind Closed Doors with Joan Lunden.

Part of his runway is shown in the 2001 movie Head over Heels.

In 2006, Tyler appeared as guest judge on the reality television program Project Runway.
