= Susan Futterman =

- Education: Mills College (BA); Harvard University (MEd)
- Occupation: Broadcast standards executive
- Employer: ABC (1976–2006)
- Known for: Director of Standards and Practices, ABC

Susan Futterman is an American broadcast standards executive who served as director of Standards and Practices at ABC from December 1976 to 2006. During a career spanning nearly three decades at the network, she oversaw content compliance for children's programming, live variety broadcasts including the American Comedy Awards, and the annual Academy Awards telecast. Her decisions generated documented disputes with television producers and writers, most notably with Glen A. Larson during the production of Galactica 1980 and with executive producer Woody Fraser over the censorship of medical commentary on the daytime program Home in 1994.

== Early life and education ==
Futterman earned a bachelor's degree in early childhood from Mills College and subsequently taught for the Head Start program in Harlem and Newark, New Jersey. She then received a master's degree in education from Harvard University and worked for the Center for Research in Children's Television. She also took courses in film-making and animation and, at the time she joined ABC, held a faculty position at Pacific Oaks College in Pasadena, California.

Before moving to network television, Futterman served as a consultant to Action for Children's Television (ACT). ACT founder and president Peggy Charren later described her function within the organization as that of a child development expert: "I never thought of Susan as an activist. She was a consultant to ACT. If we had questions about early-childhood development and how television relates to it, we asked her. Her credentials are excellent."

== Career ==
=== Children's programming (1976–1980) ===
Futterman joined ABC in December 1976 as manager of children's programs in the broadcast standards and practices department, a position the network created specifically for her. She told the Los Angeles Times in 1977 that working inside the network gave her leverage that external advocacy had not: "I agree [I spent] 13 years talking to people, being on panels, that kind of thing. Some of those people are more well-intentioned than others but even so, they never have an internal force to say, 'Change that or you're not going on the air.'" She also stated her belief that she was the only person with formal training in early childhood development to have been hired by one of the broadcast networks.

Among her early content decisions were the rejection of Tom and Jerry cartoons for excessive violence and the removal of Bugs Bunny and Road Runner cartoons from ABC's Saturday morning schedule. Both continued airing on competing networks at high ratings. Futterman required that crowd scenes in children's programs include minority representation: "They know I'm seat-belt happy and that I'm absolutely a stickler about minorities — even crowd scenes have to be mixed."

=== Galactica 1980 ===
During the production of Galactica 1980, Futterman clashed with series executive producer Glen A. Larson over the limits of acceptable broadcast content. According to story editor Allan Cole, Larson incorporated multiple references to a fictional food called "Arnie's meatballs" into the two-part episode "The Night the Cylons Landed" in direct response to Futterman's ruling that such references were lewd.

Cole and fellow story editor Chris Bunch were both critical of her involvement with the series. Cole described proposing that each episode open with an on-air address to viewers: "Why aren't you little bug snipes watching 60 Minutes?" He recalled that Futterman agreed with the suggestion.

=== American Comedy Awards (1987) ===
In May 1987, Futterman was assigned to manage content standards for the first American Comedy Awards broadcast, airing live from the Hollywood Palladium. Producer George Schlatter told the press that she would "be sitting in master control with a bleep button in her lap," given a lineup that included Robin Williams, Whoopi Goldberg, George Carlin, Sam Kinison, and Bobcat Goldthwait.

=== Home censorship controversy (1994) ===
In March 1994, Futterman's department censored comments by pediatrician Dr. Jay Gordon on the ABC daytime talk show Home, in which Gordon warned about the marketing of drugs and alcohol to children. The segment was scheduled for the March 9 broadcast. Gordon identified Futterman as responsible for the decision. Home executive producer Woody Fraser initially overrode her — one of several disputes between the two during the series' run.

Fraser told the Los Angeles Times that her content decisions followed commercial rather than editorial logic:

Susan Futterman never says to you directly it has anything to do with potential sponsor problems, but the Home show is considered to be an advertiser-friendly show. So we sell a lot of spots. We make a lot of money for the network.

— Woody Fraser, Los Angeles Times, March 19, 1994

=== Academy Awards ===
By 2005, Futterman held the title of director of broadcast Standards and Practices. In February of that year she oversaw the five-second delay on ABC's broadcast of the 77th Academy Awards, hosted for the first time by Chris Rock. At a pre-show production meeting, producer Gil Cates polled approximately 200 staff members on their tenure at the network; Futterman withdrew from the count at the 28-year mark — placing her, in Cates's informal terminology, in the "Class of 77." She told the Associated Press that she trained junior editors on delay-button protocol using tapes of Rock's cable specials: "You never trust comedians. The second people you don't trust are musicians."

== Personal life ==
A marriage announcement for Futterman appeared in the Mount Vernon, New York area press in July 1977. Her stepfather, Frank Perls, was a Beverly Hills art dealer whose clients included the printmaker Gustave Baumann. Perls's brother operated a separate gallery in New York.

Illusionist and author Jim Steinmeyer, who encountered Futterman through ABC's variety programming during the 1980s, described her in a 2022 retrospective as "stern and schoolmarm-ish, with her hair parted severely in the center and owlish horned-rimmed glasses."

Whoopi Goldberg, who hosted the Academy Awards on multiple occasions during Futterman's tenure, later noted that the two had become friends through those broadcasts.

Futterman retired from ABC in 2006 and took up art curation, which she attributed to her stepfather's career as an art dealer.
