= The Cara Williams Show =

- Genre: Sitcom
- Created by: Keefe Brasselle
- Starring: Cara Williams; Frank Aletter; Paul Reed
- Opening theme: "Cara's Theme"
- Composer: Kenyon Hopkins
- Country of origin: United States
- Original language: English
- No. of seasons: 1
- No. of episodes: 30

Production
- Running time: 30 minutes
- Production company: Richelieu Productions

Original release
- Network: CBS
- Release: September 23, 1964 – April 21, 1965

The Cara Williams Show is an American sitcom starring Cara Williams which centers on a married couple who try to conceal their marriage from their employer. Original episodes aired from September 23, 1964, until April 21, 1965 on CBS.

== Cast ==
- Cara Williams as Cara Bridges/Cara Wilton
- Frank Aletter as Frank Bridges
- Paul Reed as Damon Burkhardt
- Reta Shaw as Mrs. Burkhardt
- Jack Sheldon as Fletcher Kincaid
- Jeanne Arnold as Mary Hammilmeyer
- Audrey Christie as Agnes

== Synopsis ==
Clockwise from top: Cast members Frank Aletter, Cara Williams, and Paul Reed in a promotional photograph for The Cara Williams Show.

Cara and Frank Bridges were both divorced and co-workers at Fenwick Diversified Industries, Inc. — where Cara is a file clerk and Frank holds a management position as an efficiency expert — when they met, fell in love, and secretly got married. Although Cara's boss, Mr. Burkhardt, finds the scatterbrained Cara indispensable because only she can find anything in her incredibly complicated filing system, Fenwick Industries strictly prohibits its employees from marrying one another, so to keep their jobs the newlyweds conceal their marriage from Mr. Burkhardt. As part of the subterfuge, Cara uses her maiden name, Cara Wilton, in the office, but the couple also has to conceal the fact that they live at the same address, leading to many complicated and amusing situations for the Bridges both at work and at home. Mary Hammilmeyer is Mr. Burkhardt′s secretary. Fletcher Kincaid is a jazz trumpeter who is Cara and Frank′s next-door neighbor and friend.

Cara eventually tells Mr. Burkhardt that she and Frank are married. She convinces him that married couples are keeping Fenwick Industries in business, and he lets Cara and Frank keep their jobs.

== Production ==
Film and television actress Cara Williams had co-starred on television with Harry Morgan as Gladys Porter in the situation comedy Pete and Gladys from 1960 to 1962 and impressed CBS executives with her comic timing. Touting her as the next wacky redhead in the mold of Lucille Ball — a November 1964 TV Guide article described her as having a "feminine" comedy style like Ball′s that contrasted with the “masculine mannerisms” of Carol Burnett and Martha Raye, although Williams did not acknowledge any similarity to Ball — CBS returned her to prime-time television to star in her own show, the eponymous The Cara Williams Show, for the 1964–1965 season. In depicting a previously divorced, childless, two-income married couple, the show was ahead of its time when it premiered in September 1964.

Keefe Brasselle created and developed The Cara Williams Show and co-produced it with Phil Sharpe. Kenyon Hopkins wrote the show's theme song, "Cara's Theme."

== Broadcast history ==
The Cara Williams Show ran for a single season, airing on Wednesdays at 9:30 p.m. throughout its original September 1964–April 1965 run. Prime-time reruns of the show were broadcast on Fridays at 8:30 p.m. beginning in May 1965, the last of them airing on September 10, 1965.

== Episodes ==
| No. | Title | Directed by | Written by | Original release date |
|---|---|---|---|---|
| 1 | "Top Secret Groom" | Gene Reynolds | Larry Markes and Michael Morris | September 23, 1964 |
While arguing with a woman in a store, Cara mentions that she is married. The woman turns out to be Mrs. Burkhardt, who tells Mr. Burkhardt, who had thought Cara was single. After Cara conceals her marriage to Frank by making up a story about being married to a CIA agent named Tim Odair, Mr. Burkhardt mistakes Fletcher for Odair — and invites the "couple" over for dinner. The episode's opening and closing credits did not use the show's later theme song, "Cara's Theme."
| 2 | "From Cara With Love" | Unknown | Unknown | September 30, 1964 |
Cara and Frank plan a quiet evening at home alone to celebrate their anniversary, but the office staff is planning a surprise party to celebrate what they mistakenly believe to be Frank's birthday. Jacqueline Loughery guest-stars.
| 3 | "The Good Rumor Girl" | Howard Morris | Laurence Marks & Ed Jurist | October 14, 1964 |
Cara causes problems for Frank when she unwittingly starts a rumor that Fenwick Industries is moving. Ned Glass and Tim Graham guest-star.
| 4 | "Amelia Hofstetter, Please Go Home" | Alan Rafkin | Ed Jurist | October 21, 1964 |
Cara stumbles onto a hidden room at the office, where she finds a little old lady working who is mistakenly listed in the files as an office machine. Una Merkel guest-stars.
| 5 | "Cara Fiddles While Her Hero Burns" | Unknown | Unknown | October 28, 1964 |
A merger between Fenwick Industries and the Devereaux Glue Company may be in the offing, and Cara is assigned to escort Carter Devereaux of the Devereaux Glue Company around town. Jerry Van Dyke guest-stars as Carter Devereaux. Roxy Roth and Paul Dubov also guest-star.
| 6 | "The Wedding Rehearsal" | Unknown | Unknown | November 4, 1964 |
Cara and Frank recall how they first met at a wedding rehearsal in which they had helped to start a fight between the bride and the groom. Robert Easton, Nancy Hadley, Frank DeVol, and Barbara Perry guest-star.
| 7 | "Cool It Cara, Those Diamonds Are Hot" | Unknown | Unknown | November 11, 1964 |
Frank is entrusted with some industrial diamonds belonging to Fenwick Industries and when Cara stumbles across them, she believes that Frank has become a jewel thief. Ben Lessy guest-stars.
| 8 | "That Little Old Dressmaker, Me" | Murray Golden | Herbert Finn and Alan Dinehart | November 18, 1964 |
After Fenwick Industries develops a new miracle fabric for use in the spacesuits worn by astronauts, Cara thinks the company could earn a fortune making ladies' dresses out of it.
| 9 | "Get the Lead Out" | Gene Nelson | Ben Starr | November 25, 1964 |
With a top-secret business meeting coming up, industrial spies hide a miniature microphone in the unsuspecting Mr. Burkhardt's eyeglasses. Barbara Stuart, Norman Alden, and Del Erickson guest-star.
| 10 | "Help, I'm Being Held Prisoner By a Teenager" | Unknown | Unknown | December 2, 1964 |
Mr. Burkhardt's niece, Kasey, needs a place to stay, and she decides to stay with the supposedly single Cara. To conceal Cara and Frank's marriage from Kasey, Frank has to move in next door with Fletcher. Dave Willock, June Harding, and Karl Lukas guest-star.
| 11 | "Who Threw the Monkey Wrench in Cara Wilton′s Chowder?" | Unknown | Unknown | December 9, 1964 |
Cara organizes an employee boycott of the new food-vending machines at Fenwick Industries, unaware that installing them was Frank's idea. David Fresco, Vaughn Taylor, Larry Barton, and Wally Engelhardt guest-star.
| 12 | "Three on a Mismatch" | Unknown | Unknown | December 16, 1964 |
Cara uses a computer to find the ideal woman for Fletcher — and the computer identifies her fellow employee, Mary, as that woman. Paul Lynde guest-stars.
| 13 | "Cara, Girl Genius" | Unknown | Unknown | December 23, 1964 |
Fenwick's competitor mistakes Cara for Constance Hovac, a genius at chemistry whose services are being sought by other firms. Herbert Anderson, Danica d'Hondt, and John Banner guest-star.
| 14 | "The Pygmalion Touch" | Unknown | Unknown | December 30, 1964 |
Mr. Burkhardt thinks Frank's idea of subjecting the employees of Fenwick Industries to an efficiency study is a good idea — until he learns that he will be one of those studied. Alan Hewitt guest-stars.
| 15 | "Will Cara's Success Spoil Frank Bridges?" | Murray Golden | Laurence Marks | January 6, 1965 |
After Cara fills in for Fletcher's ailing regular vocalist during a recording session and sings "They Say It's Wonderful", her work performance falters as she daydreams about what her life would be like if she sang "You Made Me Love You (I Didn't Want to Do It)" to an adoring audience and became an internationally acclaimed singer and actress. Cliff Norton, Janet Hages, and Bobby Byles guest-star.
| 16 | "Cara Plays It Safe" | Unknown | Unknown | January 13, 1965 |
The office has just one day to go to complete a full year with no accidents, and Mr. Burkhardt wants to make sure the bumbling Cara does not ruin the record. Grace Albertson and Charles Davis guest-star.
| 17 | "Much a Glue About Nothing" | Unknown | Unknown | January 20, 1965 |
Cara ruins Mr. Burkhardt's desk with her homemade polish. Jack Searl and Bryan O'Byrne guest-star.
| 18 | "Anywhere I Hang My Hat Is Home" | Unknown | Unknown | January 27, 1965 |
Cara schemes to get Frank a better job with a rival firm. Sara Seegar, Roland Winters, and Sheila Bromley guest-star.
| 19 | "Cara, the Bird Woman of Fenwick" | Unknown | Unknown | February 3, 1965 |
Cara turns the Bridges home into a zoo when she brings home a chimpanzee and a talking myna bird she agreed to take care of for the weekend. Dave Willock, George Cisar, and John Alvin guest-star.
| 20 | "How to be Happy Though Married" | Unknown | Unknown | February 10, 1965 |
Cara is jealous when Frank's old girlfriend Bernice Tulip — the woman Frank claims he might have married if he hadn't met Cara — puts in an appearance. Melora Conway and Edward Everett Horton guest-star.
| 21 | "Cara, the Defiant One" | Unknown | Unknown | February 17, 1965 |
At the airport, Cara accidentally handcuffs herself to Mr. Burkhardt and his attaché case, which contains $500,000 in negotiable securities — and she can't find the key to free herself. Lewis Charles, Cliff Norton, and Alan Roberts guest-star.
| 22 | "An Ounce of Prevention" | Unknown | Unknown | February 24, 1965 |
Cara buys a beautiful dress that is two sizes too small for her. Determined to wear it, she goes on a crash diet. Frank Wilcox, Eleanor Audley, Dan Tobin, and Anthony Eustrels guest-star.
| 23 | "The Paint Job" | Unknown | Unknown | March 3, 1965 |
Cara's efforts to remove a spot of nail polish from Mr. Burkhardt's office wall makes things worse when the smudge begins to get bigger. Herbie Faye guest stars.
| 24 | "Variety Is the Spice of Wife" | Unknown | Unknown | March 10, 1965 |
Bored with the way she looks and constantly late for work because of the time she spends fixing her hair, Cara decides to solve the problem by buying a wig — and is upset that no one recognizes her when she wears it. Charles Lane, Peter Leeds, and Neil Hamilton guest-star.
| 25 | "Fletcher Succeeds in Business Without Really Trying" | Unknown | Unknown | March 17, 1965 |
After Fletcher takes a job at Fenwick Industries, his new boss mistakes him for Mr. Fenwick's playboy son — and treats him very well because of it. Bartlett Robinson, Arte Johnson, and Charles Davis guest-star.
| 26 | "A Pawn Ticket for a Ticker" | Unknown | Unknown | March 24, 1965 |
After Cara spends $200 on a wristwatch, she must find a hiding place for it so that Frank will not find out. Dabbs Greer, Ina Victor, Johnny Haymer, and Ben Lessy guest-star.
| 27 | "What Television Show Does Your Dog Watch?" | Howard Morris | Larry Tucker & Paul Mazursky | March 31, 1965 |
After Cara is involved in an automobile accident with television superhero Derek Jackson, she agrees to work off the damages by babysitting his dog. John Lupton guest-stars as Derek Jackson. Dee Hartford and Bern Hoffman also guest-star.
| 28 | "Cara's Private War Against Poverty" | Unknown | Unknown | April 7, 1965 |
Rumors spread among Cara and Frank's fellow employees that the two of them are in desperate need of financial help.
| 29 | "Paradise Freezes Over" | Unknown | Unknown | April 14, 1965 |
Part 1 of 2. Cara and Frank finally go on their honeymoon. They spend it a place called Paradise Lodge — which turns out to be a rundown rural resort. Pat Buttram guest-stars.
| 30 | "Paradise Lost and Found" | Unknown | Unknown | April 21, 1965 |
Part 2 of 2. On their honeymoon, Cara and Frank are getting ready to leave Paradise Lodge — until Frank hears that the fish are biting at a nearby lake. Pat Buttram and Hermione Baddeley guest-star.
