= Michael A. Krauss =

American television segment producer

Michael Arthur Krauss (born March 5, 1939, in Detroit, Michigan) is a former television segment producer and a radio interviewer. He was also a company president who headed numerous companies including Michael Krauss Productions and Group M Productions, the producer of "Mother's Minutes". The former husband of TV host Joan Lunden, he is a winner of the ACE Award in 1985 for his work as a creator and executive producer of Mother's Day. As a television segment producer, he helped to produce several shows including Good Morning America, The Mike Douglas Show, Mother's Day (Lifetime Television), Mother's Minutes, and Everyday With Joan Lunden. He is an experienced jazz and marching band drummer.

== Career ==
Krauss's first show was created as part of his graduation project for Wayne State University and was called Youth Must Know eventually aired locally on PBS. Krauss went on to segment produce the Morning Show in Detroit. After the Morning Show he segment produced The Other Side of the Stars before segment producing The Mike Douglas Show, where he claims he convinced John Lennon and Yoko Ono to cohost for 5 shows. Booking John and Yoko was an occasion and took the 14th spot on VH1's list of "100 Greatest Rock & Roll Moments on TV". He is now working on a table book about the shows with John Lennon.

After the Mike Douglas Show, Krauss went on to segment produce for ABC, where he met and married Joan Lunden of Good Morning America, and was nominated for two Emmys, including one for "Producer, Best Daytime Show". After Good Morning America, he created and segment produced Mother's Day with Joan Lunden, winning an ACE Award for Best Show in 1984. Mother's Day was also awarded the Parent's Choice Award. Day ran for years on the Lifetime channel. After Mother's Day, he produced the spin-off Mother's Minutes. "Minutes", hosted by Joan Lunden, were quick segments about taking care of children. Michael released a home video called My Newborn Baby: Everything You Need to Know about Lactation. TV Guide called this video and one about toilet training "some of the best instructional VHS home-video programs ever produced". The critical and commercial success of the home video led to a book version as well.

== Books ==
- Your Newborn Baby: Everything You Need To Know (1988) - ISBN 0-446-51374-1
- Joan Lunden's Mother's Minutes (1986) - ISBN 0-446-38257-4
