= Joseph Benti =

American former television news correspondent

Joseph Benti is an American former television news correspondent for CBS News who also served as anchor of the CBS Morning News from 1966 until 1970. Based in Los Angeles for most of his career, Benti later worked as a local anchor for KABC-TV and KNXT before retiring from journalism.

Benti, alongside CBS Evening News anchor Walter Cronkite and fellow CBS correspondent Mike Wallace, anchored the network's overnight coverage of the assassination of Sen. Robert F. Kennedy. He also interviewed Presidents Gerald Ford and Jimmy Carter.

== Early life and education ==
Born in 1932, Benti studied at Indiana State University. He received a Master's degree in journalism from the University of Iowa in 1962.

== Career ==
=== Early career ===
Benti's early career included serving as a newsman and straight man for WTHI-TV-10's "The Jerry Van Dyke Show" in Terre Haute, Indiana, alongside the actor. Benti also worked in Denmark for a while.

Benti then moved to Los Angeles in 1963, where he worked initially for KTLA. He was then hired as a correspondent by CBS News, eventually being chosen to replace Mike Wallace as CBS Morning News anchor in 1966. By 1969, the newscast had expanded to become television's first regularly scheduled hour-long broadcast.

=== National broadcasting ===
Benti co-hosted the CBS interview show Face the Nation with Martin Agronsky on December 15, 1966, when they interviewed Eugene Carson Blake, General Secretary of the World Council of Churches, and a close associate of Martin Luther King Jr.

When Senator Robert F. Kennedy was shot in Los Angeles shortly after midnight on June 5, 1968, Benti was at a nearby bar before preparing for his duties as CBS Morning News anchor. Benti was the first to announce the shooting on CBS and was the lead anchor in the early hours of the networks coverage of the assassination.

Benti interviewed President Gerald Ford in Sacramento on September 5, 1975, only hours after Manson family member Lynette "Squeaky" Fromme attempted to assassinate him. Ford discussed his stamina and his ability to deal with mental pressure.

On May 17, 1977, Benti and Connie Chung interviewed Jimmy Carter, four months after he became president.

=== Career changes ===
Benti eventually left CBS, and worked for a time as a local news anchor for KABC-TV in Los Angeles and KNXT (now KCBS-TV) in Los Angeles before leaving the latter station in April 1979. One of Benti's co-anchors on KABC-TV included John Schubeck and his co-anchors on KNXT included Sandy Hill and Connie Chung.

He became disillusioned with local television news in the Los Angeles market, commenting "I lost my interest and love for TV news in 1979," adding "it's all jockstraps and G-strings". Benti later would provide commentary in newspapers and on radio, which included a stint at KJOI-FM 98.7 (now KYSR), then hosting a special series for PBS member station KCET called "By the Year" in 1991.

== Other works ==
Benti was a close friend of science fiction author Ray Bradbury, and produced a documentary about him, Ray Bradbury: Writer, Storyteller, Dreamer. He also wrote a TV column for the Los Angeles Herald Examiner.

Benti also dabbled in acting, usually playing newscasters in films such as Perfect Gentlemen, St. Helens and Winchell.

== Personal life ==
Benti was a long time resident of the Studio City neighborhood of Los Angeles. He later moved to Camarillo, California.

He married his first wife, Rosalie Ammerman of Dana, Indiana, in 1955. They had three children and divorced in 1974.

Benti lived with TV anchor Christine Lund for several years in the late 1970s. He married fellow reporter Patty Ecker in 1980, and the couple had twins in 1982.

== Honors ==
In 1968, Benti was named to the University of Iowa's College of Liberal Arts and Sciences School of Journalism and Mass Communications Hall of Fame. At KNXT, Benti also won two Emmy Awards for a series he wrote and reported on pertaining to the Panama Canal.
