= Behind Closed Doors (1996 TV series) =

- Genre: Documentary
- Presented by: Joan Lunden
- Country of origin: United States

Original release
- Network: ABC; A&E
- Release: 1996 – 2001

Behind Closed Doors was a documentary series hosted by Joan Lunden that aired on the ABC and the A&E Network from 1996 to 2001. Lunden took cameras to places that normally were off limits to the general public.

Some places featured included:

- Up in the air aboard a U2 spyplane
- Betty Ford Center
- Behind the scenes of the New York City Subway
- The United States Mint and Treasury
- The WCW Powerplant
- The USS Key West (SSN-722) and Navy SEAL team
- The General Motors technical center in Warren, Michigan
- Richard Tyler workshop
