= Edward Faulkner =

American actor (1932–2025)

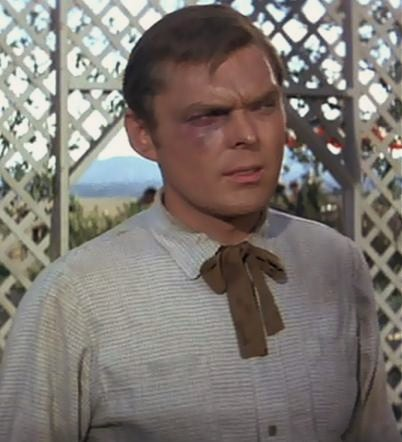
- Faulkner in McLintock! (1963)
- Born: February 29, 1932; Lexington, Kentucky, U.S.
- Died: August 26, 2025 (aged 93); Vista, California, U.S.
- Occupation: Actor
- Years active: 1959–2010
- Spouse: Barbara Faulkner (m. 1954)
- Website: edwardfaulkneractor.com

Fielden Edward Faulkner II (February 29, 1932 – August 26, 2025) was an American film and television character actor. He is most known for his roles in John Wayne films, including Hellfighters, The Green Berets, Rio Lobo, McLintock!, and The Undefeated.

== Biography ==
The youngest of two children, his father owned a building-supply company, and his mother, Ferie June, was a music teacher.

Faulkner partnered with a friend in a comedy song-and-dance act while at Henry Clay High School. He attended the University of Virginia and the University of Kentucky, acting in plays before graduating in 1954.

Faulkner served in the United States Air Force for two years as a fighter pilot, eventually leaving the service ranked first lieutenant.

Faulkner appeared in several episodes of Have Gun – Will Travel and Rawhide directed by Andrew V. McLaglen, as well as The Little Shepherd of Kingdom Come (1961).

He also played small roles on other films and TV series, including Dragnet and The Tim Conway Show.

Faulkner died in Vista, California, on August 26, 2025, at the age of 93.

== Filmography ==
- G.I. Blues (1960) – Red (uncredited)
- The Little Shepherd of Kingdom Come (1961) – Capt. Richard Dean (uncredited)
- The Horizontal Lieutenant (1962) – Officer at Welcome Party (uncredited)
- McLintock! (1963) – Young Ben Sage
- Kisses for My President (1964) – Secret Service Man (uncredited)
- How to Murder Your Wife (1965) – Club Member in Steam Room / Party Guest
- Shenandoah (1965) – Union Sergeant (uncredited)
- Tickle Me (1965) – Brad Bentley
- Sergeant Deadhead (1965) – Lt. Dixon
- The Navy vs. the Night Monsters (1966) – Bob Spaulding
- The Doomsday Flight (1966) – Reilly – Co-Pilot
- The Ballad of Josie (1967) – Juror-Livery Man (uncredited)
- Nobody's Perfect (1968) – John Abelard
- The Green Berets (1968) – Capt. MacDaniel
- The Shakiest Gun in the West (1968) – Marshal Sam Huggins
- Hellfighters (1968) – George Harris
- Daddy's Gone A-Hunting (1969) – Cop at Dixon's Party (uncredited)
- The Undefeated (1969) – Capt. Anderson
- Chisum (1970) – James J. Dolan
- Swing Out, Sweet Land (1970, TV Movie) – Bit (uncredited)
- Rio Lobo (1970) – Lt. Harris
- Triangle (1970)
- The Barefoot Executive (1971) – Reporter
- Scandalous John (1971) – Hillary
- Something Big (1971) – Capt. Tyler
- Now You See Him, Now You Don't (1972) – Mike Bank Guard (uncredited)
- The Man (1972) – Secret Service Man
- Toke (1973)
- Ride in a Pink Car (1974) – Frank Barber
- The Florida Connection (1976) – Mule Tucker
- Hard Ground (2003) – Warden

== Television ==
- Have Gun - Will Travel – 13 episodes (1958–1962)
- Rawhide – various (1959–1964)
  - (1959) – Brett Mason in "Incident of Fear in the Streets"
  - (1959) – Brett Mason in "Incident of the Shambling Man"
  - (1961) – Lobey in "The Long Shakedown"
  - (1962) – Rutledge in "The Deserters' Patrol"
  - (1962) – Carl Galt in "Incident of the Four Horsemen"
  - (1963) – Cryder in "Incident of the Gallows Tree"
  - (1964) – Pvt. Larson in "Incident at Gila Flats"
- Gunsmoke – 6 episodes – various (1959–1972)
- Bonanza – episode "The Friendship" – Bob Stevens (1961)
- The Lieutenant – episode 23 "Tour of Duty" – Lt. Shelby Logan, USN (1964)
- Bonanza – episode "No Less a Man" – Bank Robber in Green Shirt (1964)
- Wagon Train – episode "The Silver Lady" – Minister (1965)
- The F.B.I. – episode "Anatomy of a Prison Break" – Allen Wilson (1966)
- Bonanza – episode "Credit for a Kill" – Casey Rollins (1966)
- Laredo – episode "The Other Cheek" – Ed Garmes (1967)
- Gilligan's Island – episode "It's a Bird, It's a Plane" – Colonel – (1967)
- The Invaders – episode "Storm" – Alien #1 – (1967)
- Mod Squad – episode "When Smitty Comes Marching Home" – Griff (1968)
- Dragnet (1967 TV series) – episode "Public Affairs DR-12" – Agent Jim Shepheard (1968)
- It Takes a Thief – episode "The Blue, Blue Danube" – Wardlow (1969)
- The Men From Shiloh, the rebranded name of The Virginian – episode "With Love, Bullets and Valentines" – Leroy Plimpton (1970)
- O'Hara, U.S. Treasury – episode "Operation: Hijack" – Sgt. Wall and episode "Operation: Big Store" – Ike Carter (both 1971)
- Mod Squad – episode "Welcome to Our City" – Frank Dunn (1971)
- Bearcats! – episode "Assault on San Saba" – Mills (1971)
- Nichols – episode "Zachariah" - Randall (1972)
- Cannon – episode "The Island Caper" – Ferris (1972)
- Adam-12 – Sgt. Ed Powers (1972)
- Movin' On – episode "The Cowhands" – Elton Edwards (1974)
- Stowaway to the Moon - TV movie - Eli Mackernutter Sr. (1975)
- The Blue Knight – episode "The Candy Man" – Reverend Bob (1976)
- The Six Million Dollar Man – episode "Carnival of Spies" – Russian Agent (1977)
