= David Hartman (TV personality) =

American journalist and media host (born 1935)

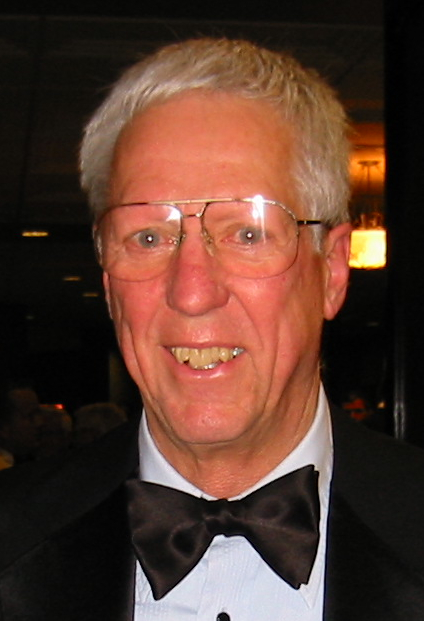
- Hartman at the Society of Experimental Test Pilots banquet in 2002
- Born: David Downs Hartman; May 19, 1935 (age 91); Pawtucket, Rhode Island, U.S.
- Occupations: Actor; Broadcaster
- Years active: 1964–present
- Spouse(s): Maureen Downey (m. 1974; died 1997) Mary Clark Putman (m. 2001)
- Children: 4

David Downs Hartman (born May 19, 1935) is an American journalist and media host who began his media career as an actor. He currently anchors and hosts documentary programs on History and PBS. Hartman is best known as the first host of ABC's Good Morning America, from 1975 to 1987. As an actor, he starred in the 1970s as a young resident, Dr. Paul Hunter, on The Bold Ones: The New Doctors and as a teacher in the series Lucas Tanner. He acted in the 1973 TV movie remake of Miracle on 34th Street.

== Early life ==
Hartman was born in Pawtucket, Rhode Island, the son of Fannie Rodman (Downs) and Cyril Baldwin Hartman.

== Acting career (1964–1975) ==
Hartman appeared in two Broadway shows: the original Hello, Dolly! in 1964, and The Yearling (1965). After working in films such as the Doris Day comedy The Ballad of Josie (1967), Nobody's Perfect (1968), and Did You Hear the One About the Traveling Saleslady? (1968) with Phyllis Diller, he refocused on television. He appeared in The Virginian in 1969 and won attention as a dedicated doctor on The Bold Ones: The New Doctors, earning a nomination for a Golden Globe award. Hartman played a lead role alongside Hal Linden in the industrial musical Diesel Dazzle (1966).

== News and broadcasting career (1975–present) ==
On November 3, 1975, Hartman became the original male co-host of ABC's new morning news show, Good Morning America (1975–1987). During his 11 years as a co-host, GMA would often be the highest-rated morning news program on network television. Although Hartman did not have a journalism background, he professionally conducted more than 12,000 interviews during his time on the show.

Hartman usually closed each Good Morning America broadcast with the same benediction: "Make it a good day today." In a statement that Hartman prepared for the 30th anniversary GMA broadcast in 2005, he explained, "My daily sign-off line, 'Make it a good day today,' reflected 'GMA's' values and the belief that each of us can affect our lives in a positive way, that our program was, we hoped, a public service."

Hartman has been an anchor and host of a series of documentaries on the Discovery Channel and PBS member station WNET in New York City. Produced by James Nicoloro, the PBS documentaries are a series of "Walk Through" documentaries about various communities around New York City, which include A Walk Down 42nd Street (August 1998), A Walk Up Broadway (March 1999), A Walk Through Harlem (December 1999), A Walk Around Brooklyn with David Hartman and Historian Barry Lewis (2000), A Walk Through Greenwich Village (2001), A Walk Through Central Park (2001), A Walk Through Newark (2002), A Walk Through Hoboken (2003), A Walk Through Queens (2004), A Walk Through the Bronx (2005), and A Walk Around Staten Island (2007).

Hartman was the 2017 recipient of the National Association of Broadcasters Distinguished Service Award.

== Personal life ==
Hartman was married to Maureen Downey from 1974 until her death on September 17, 1997. They had four children together. In 2001, he married Mary Clark Putman, a widowed homemaker.

== Filmography ==
Films
Title	Role	Director	Year	Notes #
The Ballad of Josie	Sheriff Fonse Pruitt	Andrew V. McLaglen	1967	Theatrical release
Nobody's Perfect	Boats McCafferty	Alan Rafkin	1968	Theatrical release
Did You Hear the One About the Traveling Saleslady?	Constable	Don Weis	1968	Theatrical release
The Virginian	David Sutton	Charles S. Dubin	1968	1968–1969 complete season 7 (26 episodes)
The Feminist and the Fuzz	Officer Jerry Frazer	Jerry Paris	1971	Made for television
I Love a Mystery	Doc Long	Leslie Stevens	1968	Unsold pilot filmed in 1966, later shown on NBC and in syndication
You'll Never See Me Again	Ned Bilss	Jeannot Szwarc	1973	Made for television
Miracle on 34th Street	Bill Schaffner	Fielder Cook	1973	Made for television
The Island at the Top of the World	Prof. Ivarsson	Robert Stevenson	1974	Theatrical release

Preceded by Position inaugurated	Good Morning America co-host November 3, 1975–February 20, 1987 with Nancy Dussault from 1975 to 1977, with Sandy Hill from 1977 to 1980, and with Joan Lunden from 1980 to 1987	Succeeded by Charles Gibson and Joan Lunden
