= Sandy Hill (television personality) =

American television journalist and Miss Washington

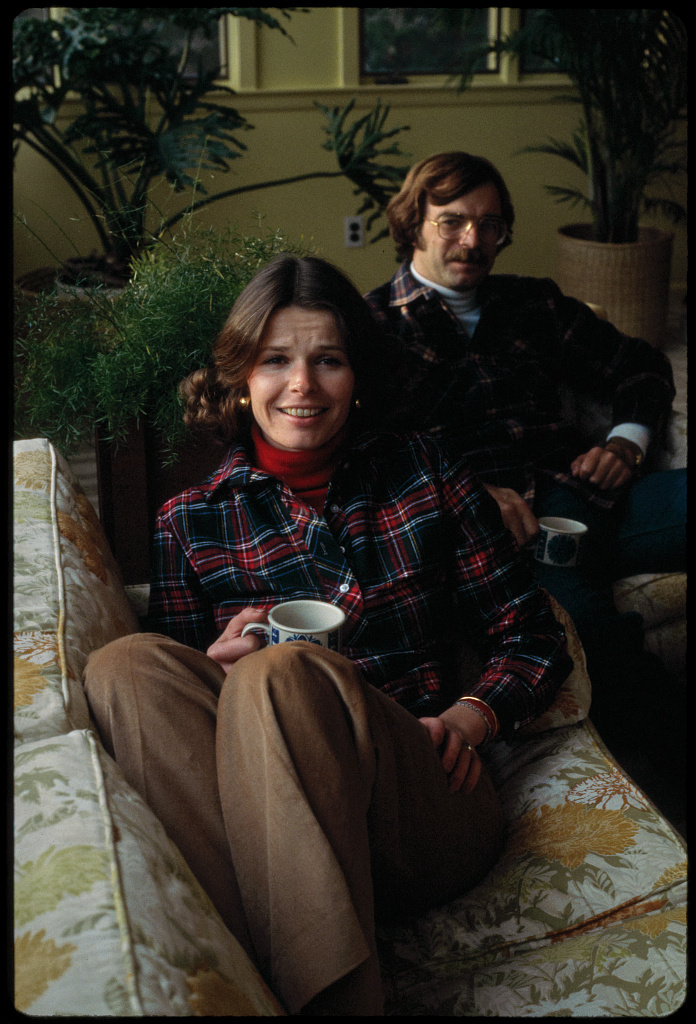
Hill with her husband Craig in the late 1970s

Sandra Marth Hill (born February 2, 1946) is an American television journalist and Miss Washington; she is also a writer and commercial real estate broker.

== Early life ==
Born Sandra Lee Marth in Centralia, Washington, she was raised on a farm there. Her father, John Marth, helped build the local Lutheran church. She was heavily involved with music and the church from an early age. She was smart and studious, graduating from Centralia High School near the top of her class. However, she was a self-proclaimed social outcast. That did not stop her from being crowned Miss Lewis County in 1965 and Miss Washington in 1966. She attended the University of Washington in Seattle on scholarship, where she studied Spanish and joined Kappa Alpha Theta sorority.

After college, Hill worked in human resources as an employment recruiter for Seattle First National Bank in Seattle, where she met Craig Hill, a junior banker at the time; the two married in 1969.

== News career ==
In the 1960s, women were virtually nonexistent in television news, with the exception of the occasional "weather girl." Hill had intended on going into international relations. By happenstance, Hill and her husband saw a newspaper advertisement looking for a women's editor on a local TV station. She applied and got the job three weeks later.

Hill began her career on air in 1969, by hosting a midday interview and news show on KIRO, the CBS affiliate in Seattle. Soon she doubled as a "street" reporter for the evening edition of KIRO's Eyewitness News. She earned a devoted following in the Pacific Northwest. During her tenure at KIRO, she won multiple local Emmy Awards for broadcasting; locals also still remember her for hosting the Big Money Movie in the afternoon.

Because of her success in Seattle, Hill was approached to co-anchor the Channel 2 News at CBS owned-and-operated KNXT (now KCBS-TV) in Los Angeles in 1974. When she accepted that position, she became the first female anchor in Los Angeles, working alongside Jerry Dunphy, Bill Stout and Joseph Benti. Unfortunately, due to poor results from a focus group, she and a number of her fellow anchors were dismissed from KNXT in 1976. She immediately received an offer from the ABC owned-and-operated station KABC.

Shortly after joining ABC, Hill was offered a national spot to join David Hartman as co-host of Good Morning America, where she debuted on April 25, 1977, as a replacement for Nancy Dussault. The format of the show was primarily driven by studio interviews in New York City led by Hartman, however, Hill successfully sought out her own interviews to conduct in the field. In 1980, Hill was replaced in the studio by Joan Lunden, but briefly stayed on GMA as a feature reporter; she went on to work for ABC Sports and Wide World of Sports.

In 1982, Hill was asked by CBS to return to KNXT in Los Angeles as an anchor for the 4:30 p.m. edition of Channel 2 News. She would later succeed Connie Chung (who went to NBC News in 1983) on KNXT's 11:00 p.m. newscast. Her co-anchors during her second stint at KNXT included Ralph Story, Jess Marlow and John Schubeck. However, in 1986, Hill was dismissed again by the station (which had changed its call letters to KCBS two years earlier), to the disappointment of her fans. Nevertheless, she returned as the co-host of The CBS Morning News later that year. Hill also would replace Mariette Hartley during the final weeks of CBS' short-lived The Morning Program In 1988, she started with Home on ABC. She also worked with the British government to create a travelog for Britain that eventually aired on PBS. In 1994, she made a cameo appearance playing a fictional version of herself in the opening minutes of the science fiction film Without Warning, which was formatted as a simulated news broadcast.

== Personal life ==
Along with her husband and son, Hill returned to their home state of Washington. She is a hobbyist author, but won the Literary Contest held by PNWA for her book, Dance While the Moon Shines. The book is a tribute to her family, and their moonshining roots. Her husband and son continue to encourage Sandy to write her own story as one of the first women in television news.

Preceded by Nancy Dussault as David Hartman's co-host from 1975 to 1977	Good Morning America co-host August 8, 1977–August 25, 1980 with David Hartman	Succeeded by Joan Lunden as co-host for David Hartman from 1980 to 1987 and with Charles Gibson from 1987 to 1997
