= Joan Lunden =

American television journalist

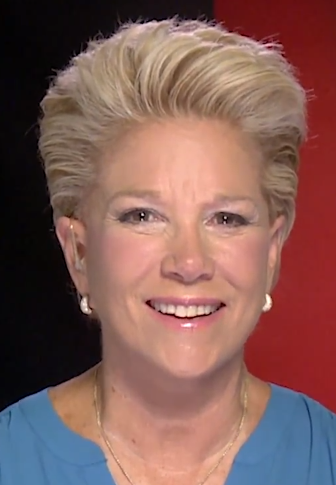
- Lunden in 2018
- Born: Joan Elise Blunden; September 19, 1950 (age 76); Fair Oaks, California, U.S.
- Education: California State University, Sacramento
- Occupation: Journalist
- Years active: 1973–present
- Spouses: Michael A. Krauss (m. 1978; div. 1992); Jeff Konigsberg (m. 2000)
- Children: 7

Joan Lunden (born Joan Elise Blunden, September 19, 1950) is an American journalist, author, and television host. Lunden was the co-host of ABC's Good Morning America from 1980 to 1997, and has authored over ten books. She has appeared on the Biography program and Biography Channel.

As of 2014, Lunden is a special correspondent for NBC's Today. In 2021, Lunden became host of the public television program Second Opinion.

== Early life and education ==
Joan Elise Blunden was born in Sacramento County, California, the daughter of Gladyce Lorraine (née Somervill) and Dr. Erle Murray Blunden. Her father was the chief of staff at American River Hospital and an amateur pilot with his own airport. She had a brother 8 months older than her named Jeff.

In 1964, her father and Dr. Byron E. Hall, a San Francisco physician, died in a plane crash in Malibu Canyon, California. They were returning from an American Cancer Society state board of directors meeting in Los Angeles.

Blunden graduated from Bella Vista High School in Fair Oaks, California at the age of 16 in 1967. She earned a Liberal Arts degree from California State University, Sacramento and studied abroad on World Campus Afloat (now Semester at Sea). Later she studied Spanish and anthropology at the former Mexico City campus of Universidad de Las Americas. She was a visiting instructor at Montclair State College in New Jersey, where she taught a course in broadcast journalism.

== Career ==
In 1973, she began her broadcasting career working as a trainee at (Channel 3) KCRA-TV in Sacramento, California. Within two years she was the co-anchor of the daily noon television news program. She produced the noon news broadcast and hosted KCRA's television specials.

=== Good Morning America ===
In 1975, Lunden moved to New York City and she found an apartment with the help of her childhood friend Jed Johnson and his longtime partner Andy Warhol. That year, she joined New York's WABC-TV Eyewitness News, at which time her name was changed to avoid being called "Blunder". A year later, she became co-anchor on the weekend newscasts. Lunden joined GMA in the fall of 1976 as a feature news/consumer reporter, and later became fill-in co-host when former co-host Sandy Hill left to work on ABC's coverage of the 1976 Winter Olympics.

Her popularity led to her quick promotion to co-host with David Hartman, the program's original host, in 1980. Later, she would spend the majority of her career hosting with ABC's Charlie Gibson. She reported from 26 countries, covered four presidents, five Olympic Games, and two royal weddings. Her popularity on the GMA program from the 1970s through the 1990s allowed her to interview U.S. Presidents and First Ladies Gerald and Betty Ford, Jimmy and Rosalynn Carter, Ronald and Nancy Reagan, George and Barbara Bush, Bill and Hillary Clinton, and also Texas Governor George W. Bush and Laura Bush prior to his election as president in 2000.

As the co-host of GMA, Lunden traveled the world, covering historic events, such as the 50th anniversary of VE Day (Victory in Europe) in 1995; the 50th anniversary of D-Day; the 1984 and 1988 Winter Olympic Games in Sarajevo and Calgary, respectively; and the wedding of Prince Charles and Diana, Princess of Wales. She covered the administrations and inaugurations of three presidents —Bill Clinton, George H. W. Bush, and Ronald Reagan. She was one of only three American journalists to interview Prince Charles during his 1983 visit to the United States.

Lunden was known for her willingness to take risks in her role as host. She climbed and rappelled Alaska's famed Mendenhall Glacier and bungee-jumped off a 143-foot bridge and paraglided off a 2,000-foot mountain during the program's highly rated trip to New Zealand. She navigated the whitewater rapids of a Georgia river for a GMA show in 1994.

While reporting on the TWA Flight 800 crash in 1996, Lunden spoke of her friendship with Jed Johnson who was a victim aboard the plane. She shared a photo of Johnson and his partner Alan Wanzenberg, and expressed her condolences. She referred to Wanzenberg as his domestic partner, which drew praise from Alan Klein, a spokesperson for Gay & Lesbian Alliance Against Defamation because Wanzenberg had been referred to as Johnson's "business partner" in initial reports. Klein said Lunden's actions were "life affirming" and partners of lesbians and gays are often ignored in news accounts of tragedies.

Lunden left GMA after 17 years as co-host with her last day being on September 5, 1997.

=== Hosting and other work ===
Lunden was a host on the A&E cable network program Behind Closed Doors (originally aired on ABC as occasional primetime specials; 1996–2001), an on-location, undercover reporter program. She also frequently guest hosted A&E's Biography, and hosted the Newborn Channel's Parenting Minutes. She has also hosted Taking Care With Joan Lunden on Retirement Living TV. In 2014, Lunden returned to morning television as a special correspondent for NBC's Today.

Her most recent television shows include hosting DirectTV's series Hometown Heroes and the Emmy-winning special America's Invisible Children. In 2021, Lunden took over as host of the public television program Second Opinion.

Lunden also hosts Health Corner, a Lifetime series sponsored by Walgreens. She is currently the spokesperson for A Place for Mom, a national senior care referral service.

She is also a public speaker in breast cancer awareness advocacy.

Lunden has guest-starred on episodes of Murphy Brown, Home Improvement and All My Children. She also made cameo appearances in the films What About Bob?, Free Willy 2: The Adventure Home, Conspiracy Theory and Thank You for Smoking.

== Career timeline ==
- 1973–1975: KCRA-TV
- 1975–2000: ABC News
  - 1975–1980: WABC reporter
  - 1976–1980: WABC anchor
  - 1976–1980: Good Morning America correspondent and fill-in anchor
  - 1980–1997: Good Morning America co-anchor
  - 1997–2000: ABC News correspondent
- 2007–2014: Retirement Living TV host/reporter
- September 30, 2014 – 2021: NBC Today Show special correspondent

== Activities ==
Lunden has earned numerous honors and awards, including the Spirit of Achievement Award from the Albert Einstein College of Medicine; National Women's Political Caucus Award; New Jersey Division of Civil Rights Award; Baylor University Outstanding Woman of the Year; and the YWCA Outstanding Woman's Award. The New York Association for Women in Communications honored Lunden with a Matrix Award for her outstanding contributions to the broadcasting field.

She was voted "Career Mother of the Year" by the National Institute of Infant Services, and in 1982–1983, honoring her dedication to motherhood, she was voted "Mother of the Year" by the National Mother's Day Committee. She has been a national spokesperson for Mothers Against Drunk Driving.

Lunden hosted ABC's broadcast of the Rose Parade in Pasadena, California, from 1989 to 1991, and from 1983 to 1996, she hosted the Walt Disney World Easter and Christmas Parades along with Alan Thicke and Regis Philbin.

In April 1991, Lunden was honored by New York Women in Communications with a Matrix Award for her "outstanding contributions to the broadcasting field." She also appeared on the cover of Woman's Day in 2004.

Lunden is involved in various personal projects, such as her Camp Reveille, a summer weekend getaway for women of all ages in Naples, Maine.

Lunden is on the board of PassportMD, an online personal health record system that uses Microsoft HealthVault, which allows families to maintain and organize their family health records.

On March 28, 2016, it was announced that Lunden would be presented the WWE's second annual Warrior Award at the 2016 WWE Hall of Fame Induction Ceremony on Saturday, April 2, 2016.

== Personal life ==
Lunden was a close friend of interior designer Jed Johnson. They met when she was in the fourth grade in Fair Oaks and he was her first boyfriend.

Lunden was married to television producer Michael A. Krauss from 1978 until their divorce in 1992. She had three daughters with Krauss: Jamie Beryl Krauss, born July 4, 1980; Lindsay Leigh Krauss; and Sarah Emily Krauss. Lunden converted to Judaism when she married Krauss.

Lunden was expecting her first child, Jamie when she began working at Good Morning America in 1980. She had enough "bargaining power" to have child-care provisions written into her contract. After an 8-week maternity leave, ABC provided facilities on set for her to breastfeed Jamie on set and on location for several months postpartum in 1980. Lunden said: "I felt that no matter how much money I was making, if I couldn't be near my baby I couldn't work". Lunden brought Jamie to work every day, until she was six months old. After that, Jamie stayed home with a housekeeper. Lunden said: "I feel pressured to run home to be with her. On the other hand, I have responsibilities to my job. There is always that tug-of-war between child and job" (p. 28).

Lunden married the owner of Camp Takajo, Jeff Konigsberg on April 18, 2000. They have four children, two sets of twins, Jack, Kim (born 2005), Kate and Max (born 2003), born with the help of a surrogate mother. Lunden has become a spokeswoman for surrogacy.

Lunden's brother Jeff Blunden died from Type 2 diabetes at age 57 in 2007. She took care of her mother Gladyce Blunden, who had dementia and became an advocate for A Place for Mom, an assisted living referral service. Her mother died at the age of 94 in 2013.

On June 24, 2014, Lunden revealed on Good Morning America that she had been diagnosed with breast cancer.

== Books ==
- Good Morning I'm Joan Lunden — ISBN 978-0399131264 (1986)
- Joan Lunden's Mother's Minutes — ISBN 978-0312458706 (1986)
- Your Newborn Baby — ISBN 978-0446513746 (1988)
- Joan Lunden's Healthy Cooking — ISBN 978-0316535885 (1996)
- Joan Lunden's Healthy Living — ISBN 978-0517708958 (1997)
- A Bend in the Road is not the End of the Road: 10 Positive Principles For Dealing With Change — ISBN 0-688-16083-2 (1998)
- Wake Up Calls: Making the Most Out of Every Day (Regardless of What Life Throws You) — ISBN 0-07-136126-X (2000)
- Growing Up Healthy: Protecting Your Child From Diseases Now Through Adulthood — ISBN 978-0743486149 (2004)
- Chicken Soup for the Soul: Thanks Mom: 101 Stories of Gratitude, Love and Good Times — ISBN 978-1935096450 (forward) (2010)
- Chicken Soup for the Soul: Family Caregivers: 101 Stories of Love, Sacrifice and Bonding — ISBN 978-1935096832 (2012)
- Had I Known: A Memoir of Survival — ISBN 978-0062404084 (2015)
- Why Did I Come into This Room?: A Candid Conversation about Aging — ISBN 978-1948677295 (2020)
- JOAN: Life Beyond the Script — ISBN 978-1637634929 (2026)

== Video ==
- Workout America (1994) (exercise video)

== Awards and honors ==
- WWE
  - WWE Hall of Fame (Class of 2016, Warrior Award)
- 2017 recipient of the National Association of Broadcasters Distinguished Service Award.

== See also ==
- New Yorkers in journalism

Preceded by Sandy Hill	Good Morning America co-host August 28, 1980–September 5, 1997 with David Hartman from August 28, 1980 to February 20, 1987, and Charles Gibson from February 23, 1987 to September 5, 1997	Succeeded by Lisa McRee
