= Paul Reed (actor) =

American actor (1909–2007)

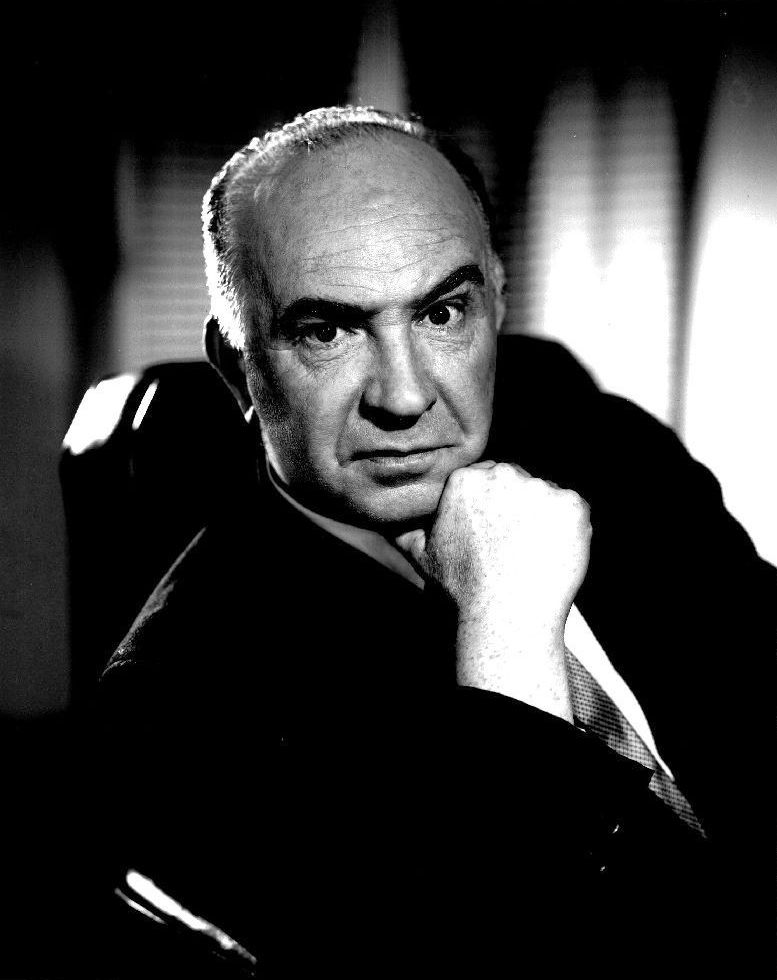
- Reed in The Cara Williams Show, 1964
- Born: Sidney Kahn; June 16, 1909; Highland Falls, New York, U.S.
- Died: April 2, 2007 (aged 97); Greenwich, Connecticut, U.S.
- Occupation: Actor
- Years active: 1925–1992
- Spouse: June MacLaren (m. 1950)
- Children: 1

Paul Reed (born Sidney Kahn; June 16, 1909 – April 2, 2007) was an American actor, known for his trademark "slow burn", which he made famous in his role as Captain Paul Block on Car 54, Where Are You?.

== Biography ==
Reed was born in Highland Falls, New York to a Russian-Jewish family. Orphaned at an early age and reunited with his family two years later in New York City, Reed started working Vaudeville Houses as a chewing gum peddler. In 1919, a performer carried him onto the stage and this began a career that would last until 1998. Reed was a performer and a singer on WOR Radio in New York City in the 1930s.

He appeared in numerous Broadway and Off-Broadway Productions from 1940 to 1972, including several Gilbert and Sullivan works and long runs with Up in Central Park, Guys & Dolls, The Music Man, How to Succeed in Business Without Really Trying, Here's Love and Promises, Promises. In 1956, his comedic talents came forward as a foil for Sid Caesar in Caesar's Hour. In 1958, he would appear on Sergeant Bilko with future Car 54, Where Are You? star Joe E. Ross.

In 1961, Reed was cast in the Nat Hiken situation comedy Car 54, Where Are You? as the beleaguered Captain Paul Block of the 53rd Precinct in the Bronx. Reed, a master of timing, was the perfect foil for the antics of the wacky police officers of the 53rd. His trademark on the show was the slow burn in which his reaction would go from restrained anger until he reached his boiling point and would explode. The show ended its run on September 8, 1963, after 60 episodes.

During the 1964–1965 season, Reed portrayed business executive Damon Burkhardt in The Cara Williams Show. He continued to work on Broadway and in sitcoms through the 1960s, appearing in various episodes of Bewitched, The Donna Reed Show, Beverly Hillbillies and I Dream of Jeannie. In 1965, he appeared with former Car 54, Where Are You? co-stars Fred Gwynne and Al Lewis in an episode of The Munsters. In later years, Reed was a staple in television commercials until the 1990s.

A book about his life and career titled You Grew Up, written by Paul Reed Jr. was released in 2010 and is available through Bear Manor Media.

== Death ==
Reed died on April 2, 2007, at age 97 in Greenwich, Connecticut. He was survived by his wife, June MacLaren Reed, son, Paul, Jr. daughter-in-law Leslie and granddaughter. He is buried in Pemaquid, Maine.

== Partial filmography ==
- The Phenix City Story (1955) - Policeman (uncredited)
- Ride to Hangman's Tree (1967) - Corbett
- Fitzwilly (1967) - Prettikin
- Did You Hear the One About the Traveling Saleslady? (1968) - Pa Webb (final film role)
