= Nobody's Perfect (1968 film) =

1968 film by Alan Rafkin

- 1968 Theatrical Poster
- Directed by: Alan Rafkin
- Written by: John D. F. Black
- Based on: The Crows of Edwina Hill by Allan R. Bosworth
- Produced by: Howard Christie
- Starring: Doug McClure; Nancy Kwan; James Whitmore; David Hartman; Gary Vinson; James Shigeta
- Narrated by: James Hong
- Cinematography: Robert Wyckoff
- Edited by: Gene Palmer
- Music by: Irving Gertz
- Distributed by: Universal Pictures
- Release date: January 12, 1968
- Running time: 103 minutes
- Country: United States
- Language: English

Nobody's Perfect is a 1968 American comedy film about the fictional USS Bustard and the antics of her crew. It is based on the novel The Crows of Edwina Hill, written by author of western novels and former Navy man Allan R. Bosworth.

== Plot ==
After World War II, four somewhat drunk US Navy sailors steal a Buddha statue from a Japanese village, but as they row back to their ship, they hear that the Navy is cracking down against such thefts, so they hide the statue in a cave. Three of the men are transferred, but the fourth, "Doc" Willoughby, sticks around aboard the submarine rescue vessel USS Bustard, based in Japan, much to the seeming exasperation of his captain, Mike Riley. (In reality, Riley thinks well of Willoughby, despite his occasional antics, and keeps persuading him to continue reenlisting.) Over the next 12 years, Willoughby gets promoted and demoted repeatedly, but eventually rises to the rank of chief petty officer.

While on liberty ashore, Willoughby falls for a seemingly demure Japanese girl in a kimono shop, who turns out to be a US Navy Nurse Corps officer of Japanese-American descent, Lieutenant Tomiko Momoyama (Kwan). She discovers she was betrothed as a child to a Japanese man named Toshi (Shigeta), who (after seeing her) fully intends to follow tradition. Toshi's uncle turns out to be from the village from which the statue was taken. Willoughby divides his time between trying to return the statue to the village and wooing Tomiko.

== Cast ==
- Doug McClure - HMC "Doc" Willoughby, USN
- Nancy Kwan - LTjg Tomiko Momoyama, NC, USN
- James Whitmore - LCDR Mike Riley, USN, Commanding Officer of USS Bustard
- James Shigeta - Toshi O'Hara
- Steve Carlson - Johnny Crane
- Jill Donohue - Marci Adler
- David Hartman - Boats McCafferty
- Gary Vinson - Walt Purdy
- George Furth - Hamner
- Keye Luke - Gondai-San
- Edward Faulkner as John Abelard
