= Loved Ones =

Loved Ones, Loved One, The Loved Ones, or The Loved One may refer to:

== Films ==
- The Loved One (1965 film), an American satire based on the Evelyn Waugh novel
- The Loved Ones (film), a 2009 Australian horror film by Sean Byrne
- The Loved One (2026 film), an upcoming Philippine romantic drama film

== Literature ==
- The Loved One (book), a 1948 short satirical novel by Evelyn Waugh
- Loved Ones (book), a 1985 selection of pen portraits by Diana Mitford

== Music ==
- The Loved Ones (Australian band), a 1960s Melbourne rock band
  - "The Loved One" (song), a 1966 song by the Australian band
- The Loved Ones (American band), a Philadelphia rock band
  - The Loved Ones (EP), a 2005 EP by the American band
- Loved Ones (album), a 1996 album by Ellis Marsalis and Branford Marsalis
- "The Loved Ones", a 1982 song by Elvis Costello and the Attractions from Imperial Bedroom
- "Loved Ones", a 2003 song by Starflyer 59 from Old
- "Loved Ones", an unreleased song by SZA and Kendrick Lamar
