= The Ballad of Josie =

1967 film by Andrew V. McLaglen

- Theatrical release poster
- Directed by: Andrew V. McLaglen
- Written by: Harold Swanton
- Produced by: Norman MacDonnell (Executive Producer) Martin Melcher
- Starring: Doris Day; Peter Graves; George Kennedy; Andy Devine; William Talman; David Hartman
- Cinematography: Milton R. Krasner
- Edited by: Fred A. Chulack; Otho Lovering
- Music by: Frank De Vol
- Production company: Universal Pictures
- Distributed by: Universal Pictures
- Release dates: December 22, 1967 (West Germany); February 1, 1968 (USA)
- Running time: 102 minutes
- Country: United States
- Language: English

The Ballad of Josie is a 1967 Technicolor American comedy Western film directed by Andrew V. McLaglen and starring Doris Day, Peter Graves, and George Kennedy. It humorously tackles 1960s themes of feminism in a traditional Western setting.

The film featured the last acting role for William Talman. It was filmed on two locations in Thousand Oaks, California: North Ranch and Wildwood Regional Park.

== Plot ==
Josie is a young woman living in the fictitious Arapahoe County, Wyoming. She accidentally kills her abusive alcoholic husband when she opens a bedroom door and knocks him backward down the stairs. She is put on trial for his death but is acquitted. Her father-in-law gets custody of her young son and takes him to Cheyenne to live while she tries to build a life as a rancher. Josie then incurs the annoyance of her male cattle rancher neighbors by raising sheep north of the Wyoming deadline) and setting up a women's suffrage movement.

== Cast ==
- Doris Day as Josie Minick
- Peter Graves as Jason Meredith
- George Kennedy as Arch Ogden
- Andy Devine as Judge Tatum
- William Talman as District Attorney Charlie Lord
- David Hartman as Sheriff Fonse Pruitt
- Guy Raymond as Doc
- Audrey Christie as Annabelle Pettijohn
- Karen Jensen as Deborah Wilkes
- Elisabeth Fraser as Widow Renfrew
- Linda Meiklejohn as Jenny McCardle
- Shirley O'Hara as Elizabeth
- Timothy Scott as Klugg The Sheepherder
- Don Stroud as Bratsch The Sheepherder
- Paul Fix as Alpheus Minick
- Harry Carey as Mooney, Meredith's Foreman
- John Fiedler as Simpson, general store owner
- Robert Lowery as Whit Minick, town drunk
- Teddy Quinn as Luther Minick, Josie's son
- Edward Faulkner as Juror/Liveryman

== See also ==
- List of American films of 1967
