= Second Opinion (TV series) =

- No. of seasons: 11
- No. of episodes: 139

Production
- Executive producer: Fiona Kay Willis
- Producers: WXXI Public Broadcasting Council & University of Rochester Medical Center
- Running time: approx. 30 min.

Original release
- Release: 2004 – present

Second Opinion, an American television series, is the only regularly scheduled health series on public television. Each week, series host engages a panel of medical professionals and patients in honest, in-depth discussions about life-changing medical decisions. Using intriguing, real-life medical cases, the specialists grapple with diagnosis and treatment options to give viewers the most up-to-date, accurate medical information. The series is produced for public television by WXXI-TV, the University of Rochester Medical Center and West 175 Productions. Second Opinion is made possible with support from the Blue Cross and Blue Shield Association.

== Synopsis ==
The goal of the series is to improve doctor/patient communication and empower viewers to take charge of their own healthcare, and in turn, help them navigate the medical system for better health outcomes. Second Opinion focuses on health literacy in a way that is relevant and accessible to both viewers and to physicians, in a format that engages and entertains viewers

In addition to presenting a medical case each week, which generates a discussion among the panel to debate the pros and cons of diagnostic testing, interpret test results, and prescribe the best course of action, the series includes two special segments. “Myth or Medicine” is a field segment where viewers can send in a health claim that they have heard, and Second Opinion’s doctors and producers get to work to find out if it is a medical myth or good medicine. “Second Opinion Five" is a short segment that allows a health care provider to speak directly to the audience, giving viewers the top five things they need to know about a topic (i.e.: Five ways to prevent skin cancer, five signs that you need to go to the ER after a head injury).

== Online offerings ==
In addition to the weekly broadcast, Second Opinion engages and educates viewers through a comprehensive web site. The site includes full episodes of recent seasons, medical information in the form of searchable video, resources and transcripts. Second Opinion can also be found on social media.

== Series producers ==
Second Opinion’s executive producer is Fiona Willis. Second Opinion is endorsed by both the American Hospital Association and the Association of Academic Health Centers. The series’ principal medical advisor is Dr. Roger Oskvig, an acknowledged leader in Gerontology and associate professor of medicine at University of Rochester Medical Center, and the inaugural recipient of the 2011 WXXI President’s Award.

== Episodes ==
=== 2004 ===
- (#101) Dementia
- (#102) Heart Failure
- (#103) Cervical Cancer and HPV
- (#104) Nutritional Supplements
- (#105) Hypertension
- (#106) Incontinence and Urine Leakage
- (#107) Breast Cancer
- (#108) Obesity
- (#109) Osteoporosis
- (#110) Heart Rhythm Disorder
- (#111) Antibiotic Use
- (#112) Menopause
- (#113) Heart Attack / Coronary Artery Disease

=== 2005 ===
- (#201) Depression
- (#202) Prostate Cancer
- (#203) Epilepsy
- (#204) Vision Correction
- (#205) Stroke
- (#206) Eating Disorders
- (#207) Joint Replacement
- (#208) Metabolic Syndrome
- (#209) Women's Cardiac Health
- (#210) Back Pain
- (#211) Colon Cancer
- (#212) Skin Cancer
- (#213) Asthma

=== 2006 ===
- (#301) Diabetes (Type 2)
- (#302) Heart Disease & Depression
- (#303) Lung Cancer
- (#304) Erectile Dysfunction
- (#305) Sleep Disorders
- (#306) Bariatric Surgery
- (#307) Flu
- (#308) Fertility
- (#309) Life after Breast Cancer
- (#310) Kidney Stones
- (#311) Longevity
- (#312) Chronic Pain
- (#313) End of Life

=== 2007 ===
- (#401) Tuberculosis
- (#402) Clinical Trials / Parkinson's Disease
- (#403) Macular Degeneration
- (#404) Gastroesophageal Reflux Disease
- (#405) Memory Enhancement
- (#406) Suicide
- (#407) Cardiac Breakthroughs
- (#408) Ovarian Cancer
- (#409) Addiction
- (#410) Migraine
- (#411) Breast Cancer Recurrence
- (#412) Osteoarthritis
- (#413) Inflammation

=== 2008 ===
- (#501) Coronary Microvascular Disease
- (#502) Hospital Acquired Infection
- (#503) Vaccines
- (#504) Hearing Loss
- (#505) Alzheimer's Disease
- (#506) Kidney Disease: Caring for Someone with a Chronic Disease
- (#507) Caregiver Burnout
- (#508) Non-Hodgkin Lymphoma
- (#509) Depression in Later Life
- (#510) Men's Health: Why Men Die Younger
- (#511) Hormone Replacement Therapy
- (#512) Hypothyroidism
- (#513) Mind/Body Connection

=== 2009 ===
- (#601) Stroke Intervention
- (#602) COPD (Chronic Obstructive Pulmonary Disease)
- (#603) Female Sexual Dysfunction
- (#604) Forever Young
- (#605) Anxiety Disorder
- (#606) Healthy Eating
- (#607) Leukemia (CLL)
- (#608) Hip Fracture
- (#609) Fibromyalgia
- (#610) Long QT Syndrome
- (#611) HIV in Middle Age
- (#612) Diabetes Prevention
- (#613) Art of Diagnosis
- H1N1 Special Edition Oct 09

=== 2010 ===
- (#701) Vitamin D
- (#702) Celiac Disease
- (#703) Multiple Sclerosis
- (#704) Bipolar Disorder
- (#705) Late Effects of Cancer Treatments
- (#706) Breast Reconstruction
- (#707) Racial Disparities in Cardiac Care
- (#708) Mammography
- (#709) Fecal Incontinence
- (#710) Heart Replacement
- (#711) HPV/Cervical Cancer
- (#712) Spinal Cord Injury
- (#713) Dizziness

=== 2011 ===
- (#801) Psoriasis
- (#802) Chronic Pain Management
- (#803) Medical Radiation
- (#804) The Aging Face
- (#805) Pelvic Organ Prolapse (POP)
- (#806) Sugar
- (#807) Pituitary Gland Tumor
- (#808) Living with Alzheimer's Disease
- (#809) Pneumonia Walking Pneumonia?
- (#810) Autism
- (#811) Colon Cancer II
- (#812) Mystery Diagnosis
- (#813) Cardiac Spouses
- (#810B) Autism-Extended Version

=== 2012 ===
- (#901) Grief
- (#902) Geriatric Oncology
- (#903) Foot Pain
- (#904) Foodborne Illness
- (#905) Breast Cancer in Young Women
- (#906) Conversion Disorder
- (#907) Lyme Disease
- (#908) Shingles
- (#909) ALS
- (#910) Irritable Bowel Syndrome
- (#911) Mystery Diagnosis
- (#912) The Future of Cancer Treatment
- (#913) Angina (Dec. 26, 2012)

=== 2013 ===
- (#1001) Melanoma (Oct. 17, 2013)
- (#1002) Concussion
- (#1003) Whooping Cough
- (#1004) Food Allergies
- (#1005) Teen Depression
- (#1006) High Risk Pregnancy
- (#1007) Hypertension
- (#1008) C. Difficile
- (#1009) Managing Diabetes
- (#1010) Reversing Heart Disease

=== 2014 ===
- (#1101) Hepatitis C
- (#1102) Addiction to Pain Medications
- (#1103) Sleep Apnea
- (#1104) Childhood Cancer
- (#1105) Advances in Alzheimer's Disease
- (#1106) Medical Marijuana
- (#1107) Knee Replacement
- (#1108) Food as Medicine
- (#1109) Mystery Diagnosis III (Dec. 18, 2014)
- (#1110) Sudden Cardiac Arrest
- (#1111) PTSD
- (#1112) Ebola
