= Jeanne Arnold (actress) =

American actress and singer (1921–1996)

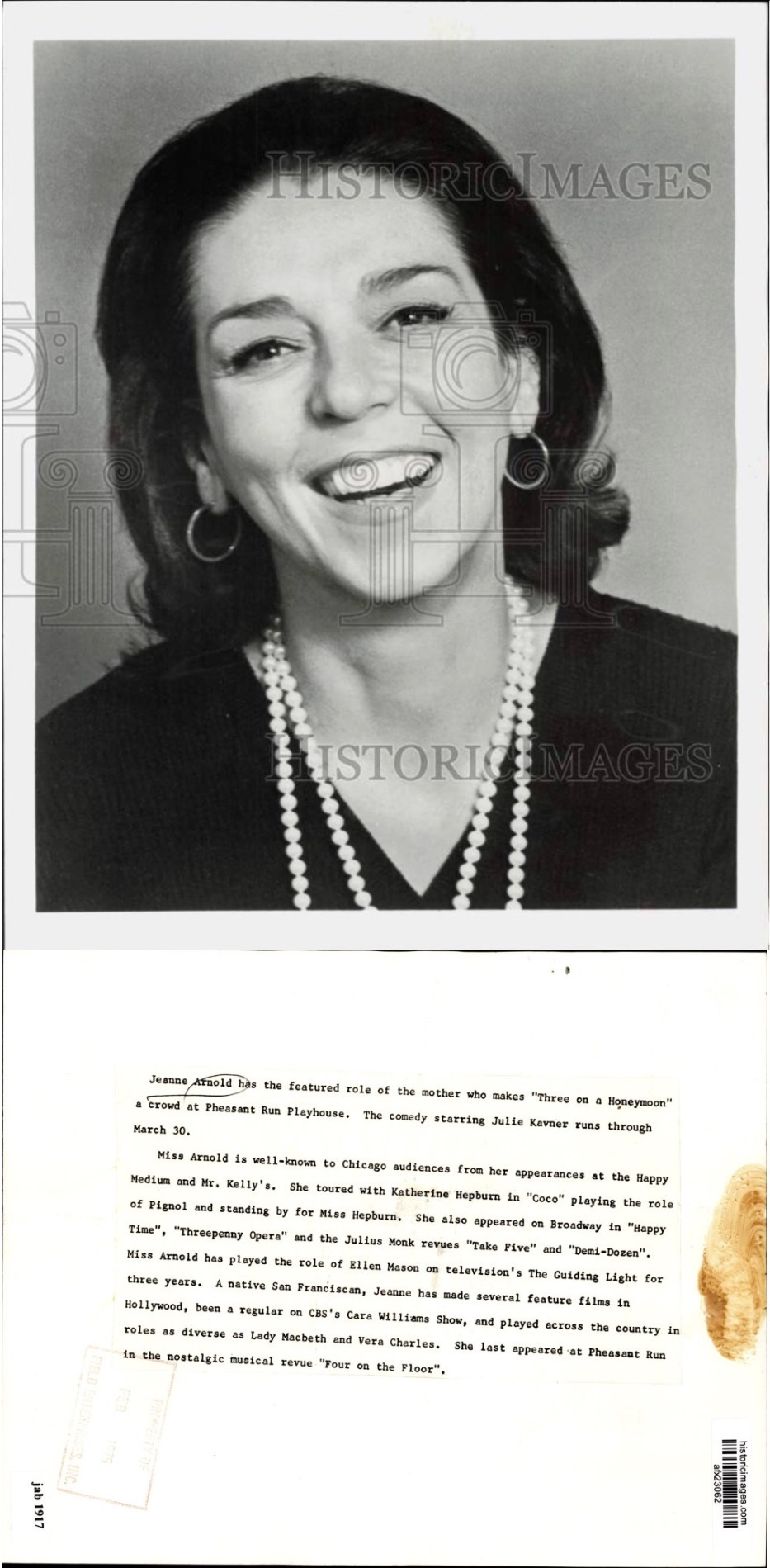
- Arnold in 1975
- Born: July 30, 1921; Berkeley, California, U.S.
- Died: September 20, 1996 (aged 75); Flint, Michigan, U.S.
- Education: University of California, Berkeley
- Occupations: Actress, singer
- Years active: 1943–1996
- Spouse: William C. Stevens (m. 1978)

Jeanne Arnold (July 30, 1921 – September 20, 1996) was an American actress and singer known for her work in Broadway and Off-Broadway theater, television, cabaret, and regional theater. She appeared in productions including The Threepenny Opera, Coco, The Happy Time, and the daytime soap opera Guiding Light. Later in her career she became associated with Michigan's Meadow Brook Theatre.

== Early life and education ==
Arnold was born on July 30, 1921, in Berkeley, California, the daughter of George Arnold and Agnes Kirkman Arnold, and was raised in San Francisco.

As a child she performed in school assemblies and theatrical activities. She attended a convent school and later studied acting at a Jesuit college before enrolling at the University of California, Berkeley, where she concentrated in speech and history and graduated in 1943.

Inspired by radio drama and 1930s films, particularly the performances of Spencer Tracy, Arnold moved to New York during World War II in hopes of entering professional theater and radio.

== Career ==
During World War II, Arnold worked with an Army Special Services troupe on a European tour. She later recalled auditioning for a USO entertainment unit while working as a tour guide at Rockefeller Center.

Following the war, she continued theatrical work in Germany and France before returning to California.

Arnold performed in theaters and nightclubs in New York, Los Angeles, Chicago, and San Francisco.

She first gained significant critical attention in New York for playing Lucy in a revival of The Threepenny Opera. She also appeared for two seasons at the New York cabaret venue Upstairs at the Downstairs.

Her Broadway and Off-Broadway credits included The Threepenny Opera, The Beggar's Opera, The Happy Time, and the musical Coco starring Katharine Hepburn.

Arnold also performed and recorded as a singer. Her best-known recording was the satirical song "Gristedes" from the album Take Five with Ronnie Graham.

In 1964 Arnold was cast in her first major television assignment, a regular featured role on the CBS sitcom The Cara Williams Show where she portrayed Mary Hamilmeyer, a secretary at Fenwick Industries.

She also became familiar to television audiences for her three-year portrayal of Ellen Mason on the soap opera Guiding Light during the late 1960s.

In 1974 she appeared in the educational children's television program Cozmics, portraying the eccentric science instructor Ms. Strator.

Arnold also appeared as a guest on the television talk program Girl Talk alongside Brenda Vaccaro and Virginia Graham.

Her film roles include an uncredited role as Rita in Dear Heart (which original title was "The Out-of-Towners"), Grace Munster in Munster, Go Home! (1966) and Gertrude in What's So Bad About Feeling Good? (1968).

Arnold became a prominent performer at Meadow Brook Theatre at Oakland University near Rochester, Michigan.

Her Meadow Brook performances included She Stoops to Conquer, Picnic, The Corn Is Green, Blithe Spirit, The Dining Room, Cat on a Hot Tin Roof, Deathtrap, and What I Did Last Summer.

Arnold frequently received favorable critical notices for her versatility and comic range.

She also performed one-woman musical and theatrical shows in Michigan, including Jeanne Arnold Sings!!! at Buckham Alley Theatre in Flint in 1992.

== Personal life and death ==
In 1978 Arnold married William C. Stevens, chairman of Henry H. Stevens Moving and Storage Company of Flint, Michigan, who she had 3 stepchildren.

In the 1990s she remained active in Flint civic and cultural events, serving as mistress of ceremonies for the Flint YWCA Women of Achievement Awards Dinner in 1995.

Arnold died of cancer in 1996 at the age of 75 in Flint, Michigan.

== Filmography ==
=== Film ===
Year	Title	Role	Notes
1964	Dear Heart	Rita	Uncredited
1966	Munster, Go Home!	Grace Munster	
1968	What's So Bad About Feeling Good?	Gertrude	
1971	Mr. and Mrs. Bo Jo Jones	Joan Hartlane	Television film
1971	The Pompeii Way	Senilita	Television film

=== Television ===
Years	Title	Role	Notes
1964	My Three Sons	Helen Powell	1 episode
1964–1965	The Cara Williams Show	Mary Hammilmeyer / Mary Hammiimeyer	16 episodes
1965	Camp Runamuck	Diana	1 episode
1965	I Spy	Mme. Chulock	1 episode
1965–1966	Please Don't Eat the Daisies	Mrs. Podesta	3 episodes
1966	The Farmer's Daughter	Jan Cummings / Ellen	2 episodes
1966	The Monkees	Maria	1 episode
1969–1973	Guiding Light	Ellen Mason	1266 episodes
1972	Bewitched	Maude Hickman / Martha Norton	2 episodes
