= Nancy Dussault =

American actress and singer (born 1936)

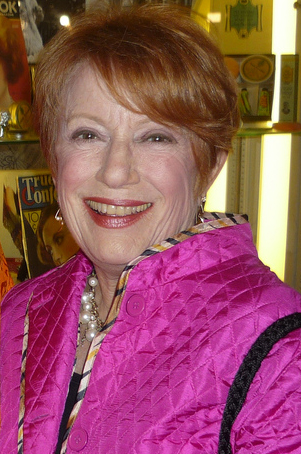
- Dussault in 2010
- Born: June 30, 1936 (age 90); Pensacola, Florida, U.S.
- Education: Northwestern University
- Occupations: Actress, singer
- Years active: 1961–present
- Known for: Too Close for Comfort; The New Dick Van Dyke Show
- Spouses: James Dunton Travis (m. 1958; div. 1982) Valentine Mayer (m. 1985)

Nancy Dussault (born June 30, 1936) is an American actress and singer.

She is best known for playing Muriel Rush in the sitcom Too Close for Comfort (1980–1987). In a career spanning over half a century, Dussault received two Tony Award nominations.

== Broadway ==
In 1962, Dussault stepped into the role of Maria in the Broadway production of The Sound of Music. She received a Tony Award nomination in 1961 for Best Featured Actress (Musical) for Do Re Mi and was nominated for her performance in Bajour (1965). Of her performance in Do Re Mi and later career, Bloom and Vlastnik wrote: "Confidently clowning alongside such pros as Phil Silvers and Nancy Walker...she never faded into the scenery. Equally comfortable as a pure soprano or a rangy high belter, her versatility was well captured on the...cast album...Well cast as a situation comedy wife, she spent much of the 1970s and 80s in California." Other stage shows included Quality Street in 1965 at the Bucks County Playhouse in Pennsylvania. In 1978 she played the title role in Peter Pan at the Meldoy Top Theatre in Wisconsin and Sacramento Music Circus. She also appeared in the City Center Gilbert & Sullivan NYC Company, directed by Dorothy Raedler, with such opera singers as Nico Castel, Muriel Costa-Greenspon, and Frank Porretta, Sr. Dussault took over as the Witch in Into the Woods on Broadway (1987–1989). She had appeared twelve years earlier in the revue Side by Side by Sondheim on Broadway. More recently she has appeared at The American Conservatory Theater in San Francisco as Mrs Peachum in "The Threepenny Opera" (1999) and as Toinette in Moliere's "The Imaginary Invalid" (2007)

== Film ==
In Arthur Hiller's 1979 film The In-Laws, she played Carol Kornpett, wife of Alan Arkin who played Sheldon S. Kornpett, D.D.S.

== Television ==
On television, Dussault made guest appearances (primarily as a vocalist and dancer) on variety shows of the 1960s, including The Ed Sullivan Show, The Carol Burnett Show, and The Garry Moore Show. She was a regular on the first two seasons of the 1970s series The New Dick Van Dyke Show and the long-running CBS game show Match Game. In 1973, Carl Reiner created "The Nancy Dussault Show" as a vehicle for Nancy, but the pilot never sold, and the show was shelved. Dussault played the pivotal character in the 1975 "The Courtesans" episode of Barney Miller (S1 E5), when creator/producer Danny Arnold threatened to quit his own show if network censors removed a risque line. The resulting publicity over the x-rated episode ensured the series ratings survival, according to Hal Linden.

Dussault guest-starred in an episode of the 1979 NBC anthology series $weepstake$. She also played Ted Knight's wife in the role of photographer Muriel Rush on the 1980s situation comedy Too Close for Comfort. She was part of the first anchor team of the ABC morning show Good Morning America, paired with David Hartman, when that show launched in 1975. Dussault was the first actress to portray the character of Theresa Stemple, the mother of character Jamie Stemple Buchman, in season one of the NBC TV series Mad About You. In January 1997, she played the mayor of Metropolis in Lois & Clark: The New Adventures of Superman ("Lethal Weapon" – Season 4, Episode 12).

== Awards and nominations ==
Year	Award	Category	Nominated work	Result	Ref.
1961	Theatre World Awards	—N/a	Do Re Mi	Won	
1961	Tony Awards	Best Supporting or Featured Actress in a Musical	Do Re Mi	Nominated	
1965	Tony Awards	Best Leading Actress in a Musical	Bajour	Nominated	

Preceded by None	Good Morning America co-host November 3, 1975–August 5, 1977 with David Hartman	Succeeded by Sandy Hill as David Hartman's co-host from 1977 to 1980
