= What's So Bad About Feeling Good? =

1968 film by George Seaton

- Directed by: George Seaton
- Screenplay by: George Seaton; Robert Pirosh
- Story by: George Seaton
- Based on: novel "I Am Thinking of My Darling" by Vincent McHugh
- Produced by: George Seaton
- Starring: George Peppard; Mary Tyler Moore
- Cinematography: Ernesto Caparrós
- Edited by: Alma Macrorie
- Music by: Frank De Vol
- Color process: Technicolor
- Production company: Universal Pictures
- Distributed by: Universal Pictures
- Release date: May 24, 1968 (New York City)
- Running time: 94 minutes
- Country: United States
- Language: English
- Budget: $2 million

What's So Bad About Feeling Good? is a 1968 American fantasy comedy film directed by George Seaton and starring George Peppard and Mary Tyler Moore.

The film opens with a former advertising executive who has become a misanthropic artist, following a Beatnik–Bohemian lifestyle in a commune which caters to the needs of melancholic people who are waiting for the end of the world. A toucan arrives in New York City as a stowaway in a Greek boat, enters the commune and spreads a contagious virus which causes intense feelings of giddiness, happiness, and kindness. The artist is infected and he feels a purpose in his life for the first time. He decides to infect his girlfriend, the entire commune, and most of the population of New York City. He unintentionally destroys the city's economy, because the infected residents suddenly stop buying alcohol, tobacco or drugs. New York's stock exchange and its business districts are about to collapse because the infected are not in the right state of mind to operate them. The political leaders approve an urgent vaccination program to turn New Yorkers back to their natural nasty behavior.

== Plot ==
Pete is a former advertising executive living a Beatnik–Bohemian life, as part of a commune in a New York City loft. Since living in the commune, Pete has turned into a cynical, misanthropic artist. The members of the commune are seemingly aimless, indolent or melancholy while waiting for the world to end; one member lives her life in a burlap sack, with only her bare feet protruding.

One day, a wayward toucan arrives at the loft. The toucan, which stowed away on a Greek banana boat from South America, carries a unique and highly contagious virus. The virus causes intense feelings of giddiness, happiness, and kindness in anyone affected by it.

Pete initially catches the virus and in an outbreak of euphoria, suddenly senses a purpose in his life. Pete's girlfriend Liz is initially horrified at his behavior change. When she learns from nearby police about the bird's virus, she tries to warn him, but he has already shaved his beard off and proposes marriage and conventional living. Pete plans to trick her and the other residents of his loft into getting infected, by pretending to be the nihilist German philosopher leader of a doomsday cult popular in the commune, and spreading it through close facial contact with them. In his disguise, he convinces Liz to let him kiss her, but he is soon revealed as himself.

The now upbeat collective keep the toucan, nicknaming it "Amigo". They then decide to spread the virus to as many people as they can in New York City, disguising themselves in conventional dress. Liz is physically immune, but the positivity she encounters from her friends leads her to respond in kind. When authorities show up to catch the bird, Pete and Liz spirit him away by Liz hiding him in her dress and pretending to be pregnant, though the ruse is complicated when "nice" police take the couple to a hospital to give birth.

The virus is quickly spread across New York City. Rude telephone clerks are suddenly polite and understanding. Those immune to the virus are also nice, as almost everyone else acts nice to them. Pete returns to his job as an advertising executive, but insists, however, that all the ads be honest. This initially gets him fired, but when his fellow executives are later infected, he is rehired and given a raise.

Government leaders determine that the spread of the virus threatens the economic lifeblood of New York City; residents suddenly stop buying alcohol, tobacco or drugs, and the stock exchange and business districts are threatened with collapse if everyone is happy and nice to one another.

J. Gardner Monroe is sent by the government to New York to stop the outbreak. He arrives wearing a space helmet. After several attempts, the toucan is intercepted and a cure is found. The vaccine is spread around the city via gasoline and industrial exhaust fumes. Cured New Yorkers return to their nasty ways, but those immune to the virus, and who only acted nice because others were, remain nice.

Pete, now "cured", returns to the loft, while Liz declares she can no longer live in such a way, and liked Pete better when he was "sick". Liz plans to return to her hometown and visits a zoo where the toucan is now caged to say goodbye. Pete shows up independent of Liz and almost misses connecting with her, but the bird escapes from its cage and as he follows it, is reunited with her. They catch the bird, Liz pretends to be pregnant again to rescue Amigo, and they all escape from the zoo.

== Cast ==
- George Peppard as Pete
- Mary Tyler Moore as Liz
- Dom DeLuise as J. Gardner Monroe
- John McMartin as The Mayor
- Nathaniel Frey as Conrad
- Charles Lane as Dr. Shapiro
- Jeanne Arnold as Gertrude
- George Furth as Murgatroyd
- Morty Gunty as Sgt. Gunty
- Thelma Ritter as Mrs. Schwartz
- Joe Ponazecki as Officer Ponazecki
- Frank Campanella as Captain Wallace
- Susan Saint James as Aida
- Don Stroud as Barney

== Production ==
The film was the first in a three-picture deal between Seaton and Universal. The script was written by Seaton and Robert Pirosh who had last worked together on A Day at the Races (1937). Filming was meant to start in 1966 but was pushed back until the following year. "For those of us who've been in analysis, it'll be a lot of fun," said George Peppard, who signed to play the male lead. His co-star was Mary Tyler Moore, then under long-term contract to Universal.

"This picture is now comedy, influenced by the new wave," said Seaton. "There's not so much emphasis on the story and everything tying in anymore. Sometimes there's a scene almost extraneous but if it is entertaining or extraneous audiences accept this. Today's comedy writing mirrors the times. It's much harder to make people laugh today because of the world conditions. The young certainly don't have much to laugh about. So humor in film has to be so wild, so outlandish, that you can't help but laugh. The sophisticated humor of 20 years ago, the Noël Coward type of thing is not today. Not now."

The film was shot entirely on location in New York. The cooperation of Mayor John Lindsay meant it was the first film to be shot in New York City Hall.

== Analysis ==
In a September 2020 episode, This American Life compares portions of the film with themes similar to the COVID-19 pandemic, such as a suggestion to wear masks to avoid airborne contagion, and economic impacts of a virus on tax revenue. However, the virus in the film causes only euphoria. The film has also earned comparisons to the Apple TV show Pluribus, particularly how the infected become happy and strive to share the virus with others against their will; in both medias, the infected transfer the virus through kissing, as well as certain humans being immune to its effects. However, in the film, the virus eventually wears off and does not create a homogenous hive mind such as in Pluribus.

== See also ==
- List of American films of 1968
