= Did You Hear the One About the Traveling Saleslady? =

1968 film

- Theatrical release poster
- Directed by: Don Weis
- Screenplay by: John Fenton Murray
- Story by: James Fritzell; Everett Greenbaum
- Produced by: Si Rose
- Starring: Phyllis Diller; Bob Denver; Joe Flynn; Eileen Wesson; Jeanette Nolan; Paul Reed; Bob Hastings; David Hartman
- Cinematography: Bud Thackery
- Edited by: Edward Haire; Dale Johnson
- Music by: Vic Mizzy
- Production company: Universal Pictures
- Distributed by: Universal Pictures
- Release date: July 14, 1968
- Running time: 96 minutes
- Country: United States
- Language: English

Did You Hear the One About the Traveling Saleslady? is a 1968 American comedy film directed by Don Weis and written by John Fenton Murray. The film stars Phyllis Diller, Bob Denver, Joe Flynn, Eileen Wesson, Jeanette Nolan, Paul Reed, Bob Hastings and David Hartman. The film was released on July 14, 1968, by Universal Pictures.

== Plot ==
Missouri, 1910: In town trying to sell player pianos, traveling saleslady Agatha Knabenshu doesn't have much luck. She lends $1,000 to struggling inventor Bertram Webb, whose new invention, a cow-milking machine, promptly causes $1,500 in damages.

With heartless banker Hubert Shelton about to foreclose on the Webb family's home, Bert has one last hope, a wood-burning automobile that he's created. At an auto race with a $1,500 first prize, Bert is unable to drive, so Agatha gets behind the wheel in his place and wins the race.

== Cast ==
- Phyllis Diller as Agatha Knabenshu
- Bob Denver as Bertram Webb
- Joe Flynn as Hubert Shelton
- Eileen Wesson as Jeanine Morse
- Jeanette Nolan as Ma Webb
- Paul Reed as Pa Webb
- Bob Hastings as Lyle Chatterton
- David Hartman as Constable
- George N. Neise as Ben Milford
- Anita Eubank as Young Girl
- Kelly Thordsen as Enoch Scraggs
- Jane Dulo as Clara Buxton
- Charles Lane as Mr. Duckworth
- Dallas McKennon as Old Soldier
- Herb Vigran as Baggage Man
- Lloyd Kino as Laundrey Man
- Warde Donovan as Salesman
- Eddie Quillan as Salesman
- Eddie Ness as Salesman
