= Jeanne Arnold (archaeologist) =

American archaeologist

Jeanne E. Arnold was an American archaeologist who taught in the anthropology department at the University of California, Los Angeles. Her fields of research covered many topics, but she specialized in the prehistoric and early contact era of the Pacific Coast of North America, in California and British Columbia. Her work in these areas was directed to resolving the economies and political evolutionary trajectories of complex hunter-gatherer groups. She died on November 27, 2022, following a long illness.

== Background ==
Arnold was born in northern Ohio and had an early start on her decision to pursue a career in archaeology and anthropology when she attended a National Science Foundation field school in western Pennsylvania during high school. Her B.A. in anthropology came from the University of Michigan in 1976. From there she attended graduate school at the University of California, Santa Barbara to receive her M.A. in 1979 and Ph.D. in 1983.

In the 1970s, she assisted on a University of Michigan project in the Netherlands investigating Neolithic and Mesolithic cultures and served as a field co-director in Michigan surveying the Raisin River region, but once attending graduate school in California, her work turned to the Pacific Coast. In 1980, she began her research in the Channel Islands of California, followed in the late 1980s and 1990s by several major National Science Foundation projects under her direction, analyzing the development of complex hunter-gatherer-fisher groups. Her excavations and research on the Chumash people of the Channel Islands have been continuous since then. Most recently, the Channel Islands Household Archaeology Project aims to understand household and community organization of maritime complex hunter-gatherers located along the Pacific Coast. Arnold has worked with students and colleagues to better understand these complex groups and their political economies. Many articles also detail maritime resources, the origins of ocean-going canoes, and their relation to emerging sociopolitical complexity. Arnold's work on the Fraser River Valley Project in British Columbia (2002–2006) has explored late pre- and post-contact village sites along one of the world's richest salmon rivers and enhanced knowledge about local Sto:lo First Nations culture.

Since 2001, Arnold has been a member of the UCLA Center on Everyday Lives of Families, directed by Elinor Ochs, participating in a long-term, systematic study of modern-day middle-class families and their built spaces in the Los Angeles area. Arnold designed the ethnoarchaeology part of the research. Using “systematic recording of each family member’s uses of home spaces at closely timed intervals, a digital archive of photographs of each home’s indoor and outdoor spaces, detailed floor plans of homes and yards, and self-narrated video home tours by parents and older children explaining their perceptions of their homes,” an analysis of modern American homes and their changes emerges.

== Career ==
Arnold was professor of anthropology at the University of California, Los Angeles, from 1988 and was Vice Chair from 2001–2007 and Associate Director of the Cotsen Institute of Archaeology at UCLA for 11 years. She was principal investigator for several excavation projects funded by the National Science Foundation on the Channel Islands. Also, she directed many archaeological field schools in California. She served as a Research Associate in Anthropology at the Santa Barbara Museum of Natural History since 1989.

== Awards and honors ==
In 2003, Arnold was commended by the U.S. Department of the Interior for her 14 years of serving on the Society for American Archaeology National Historic Landmarks Committee

== Key excavations ==
Excavations in the California Channel Islands have included extended fieldwork on Santa Cruz Island, CA, from 1980 through the present and direction of UCLA archaeological field classes from 1990-1998. She has also co-directed, along with colleagues from Simon Fraser University, University of British Columbia, and Sto:lo Nation, excavations in the Fraser River Valley in British Columbia, beginning in 2002.

== Research emphases ==
Arnold's research emphasizes the complex hunter-gatherer-fisher societies on the Pacific Coast of North America. She has examined the households and complex organization of the Chumash Indians as well as the Sto:lo people in British Columbia. Her findings highlight the importance of securing control over the labor of unrelated members of society by aspiring leaders in the emergence of these societies, using the Channel Islands data as a case study. Arnold's model suggests that emerging complex societies reorganize fundamental labor relations, often in the context of stressful social and/or ecological conditions. The research included analyzing the importance of various marine food resources and significant paleoclimatic shifts to these societies. Arnold has been working on the Channel Islands since 1980, most recently on well-preserved house remains and large-scale, specialized craft production industries of central importance to the Island Chumash such as shell-bead manufacturing. She has emphasized the daily lives of politically complex hunter-gatherer societies on the Pacific Coast and how technologies such as sophisticated boats and the reorganization of key production and trade systems led to their increasing complexity.

== Selected books and monographs ==
- 2001. Arnold, J.E. (Editor). The Origins of a Pacific Coast Chiefdom: The Chumash of the Channel Islands. University of Utah Press.
- 1996. Arnold, J.E. (Editor). Emergent Complexity: The Evolution of Intermediate Societies. International Monographs in Prehistory, Ann Arbor.
- 2004. Arnold, J.E. (Editor). Foundations of Chumash Complexity. Cotsen Institute of Archaeology, Los Angeles.
- 1987. Arnold, J.E. Craft Specialization in the Prehistoric Channel Islands, California. University of California Press, Berkeley.

== Selected papers ==
- 1992 Complex Hunter-Gatherer-Fishers of Prehistoric California: Chiefs, Specialists, and Maritime Adaptations of the Channel Islands. American Antiquity, 57:60-84.
- 1993 Labor and the Rise of Complex Hunter-Gatherers. Journal of Anthropological Archaeology, 12:75-119.
- 1995 Transportation Innovation and Social Complexity among Maritime Hunter-Gatherer Societies. American Anthropologist 97:733-747.
- 1995 Social Inequality, Marginalization, and Economic Process. In Foundations of Social Inequality, T.D. Price and G.M. Feinman (eds.), pp. 87–103. Plenum, New York.
- 1996 The Archaeology of Complex Hunter-Gatherers. Journal of Archaeological Method and Theory 3:77-126.
- 2000 Revisiting Power, Labor Rights, and Kinship: Archaeology and Social Theory. In Social Theory in Archaeology. M.B. Schiffer ed. University of Utah Press.
- 2000 The Origins of Hierarchy and the Nature of Hierarchical Structures in Prehistoric California. In Hierarchies in Action: Cui Bono? (M.W. Diehl, ed.), pp. 221–240. Center for Archaeological Investigations, Occasional Paper 27, Southern Illinois University, Carbondale.
- 2004 (w/ M. Walsh and S. Hollimon) The Archaeology of California. Journal of Archaeological Research 12:1-73
- 2004 A Transcontinental Perspective on the Evolution of Hunter-Gatherer Lifeways on the Plateau: Discussion and Reflection. In Complex Hunter-Gatherers: Evolution and Organization of Prehistoric Communities on the Plateau of Northwestern North America (W. Prentiss and I. Kuijt, eds.), pp. 171–181. University of Utah Press.
- 2005 (w/ J. Bernard) Negotiating the Coasts: Status and the Evolution of Boat Technology in California. World Archaeology 37:109-131.
- 2006 Households on the Pacific Coast: The Northwest Coast and California in Comparative Perspective. In Household Archaeology on the Northwest Coast (E. A. Sobel, D. A. Trieu Gahr, and K. M. Ames, eds.), pp. 270–285. International Monographs in Prehistory, Ann Arbor.
- 2007 Credit Where Credit is Due: The History of the Chumash Oceangoing Plank Canoe. American Antiquity 72:196-209.
