= Woody Fraser =

American television producer (1934–2024)

Woody Fraser (16 November 1934 – 21 December 2024) was an American television producer and director. He launched The Mike Douglas Show and Good Morning America.
