= Action News Jax =

Action News Jax is the branding used for the local news operations of these two television stations in Jacksonville, Florida:

- WFOX-TV, a Fox affiliate
- WJAX-TV, a CBS affiliate
