= Frank McGehee =

Frank Sutton McGehee, Sr. (August 15, 1928 – July 12, 2006) was a business and civic leader from Jacksonville, Florida, USA, who was on the boards of many non-profit entities and a generous supporter of the Bolles School.

== Early years ==
McGehee was born and raised in Jacksonville and graduated from the Bolles School. He attended the University of Alabama, earning a bachelor's degree in economics in 1950. He married Ann Whitehurst in 1949 and they had three children, Frank S. Jr. (Sutton), David S. and Ann.

== Business ==
His father, Clifford Graham McGehee, had founded the Jacksonville Paper Company in 1919, and after college, Frank went to work in the family business. By 1956, his brother Tom McGehee became president of the company, which was sold by the family in 1965. The brothers immediately started a new company, Mac Papers, to target the printing and graphics industries. The business was successful and expanded in eight southeastern states. In 2006, the firm recorded sales in excess of $500 million, employed 950 people and was one of the 50 largest private companies in the Greater Jacksonville Metropolitan Area.

== Television ==
The brothers founded Christian Television of Jacksonville. The non-profit purchased Channel 47 before it was launched in August 1980 and requested the call letters, WXAO. "XAO" stood for "Christ, the alpha and the omega" in Greek. Their intent was to be an alternative to commercial television's sex and violence by broadcasting programs from The PTL Club, Christian Television Network and Trinity Broadcast Network. The station was Jacksonville's first 24-hour station, but never generated a large viewership and was sold in 1990 for approximately $3 million.

== Community ==
McGehee was a founding member and long-time deacon at the San Jose Church of Christ. He was active in civic endeavors in Jacksonville and was as a trustee for Wolfson Children's Hospital, including a term as chairman. He was also Bolles School board chairman, a National Paper Trade Association director, president of the Georgia Christian School and Home in Valdosta, vice-president of the North Florida Council of the Boy Scouts of America and director of the now-defunct Flagship Banks of Jacksonville.

The McGehee Auditorium at the Bolles School was dedicated in 1976, a gift from Ann and Frank McGehee.

He and his wife established the Frank and Ann McGehee Endowment with the Community Foundation in Jacksonville to award grants to worthy non-profit organizations.

== Death ==
McGehee died in 2006 at the age of 77 after ten years with dementia.
