= Rubem Robierb =

Brazilian visual artist (born 1976)

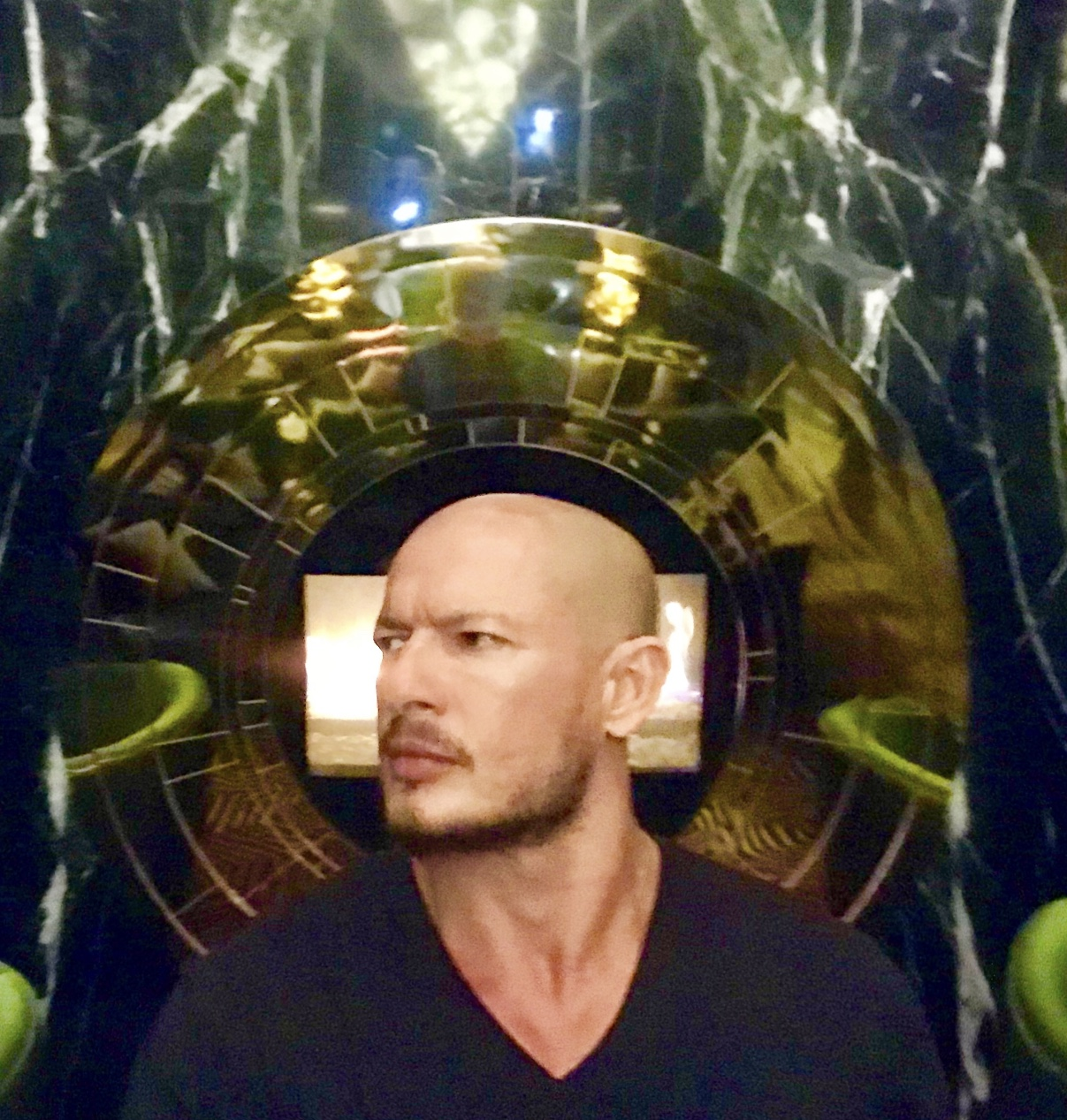
- Born: 1976; Bacabal, Maranhão, Brazil
- Known for: Sculpting, Photography and Painting
- Notable work: Climate Meltdown, Dandara
- Movement: Figurative painting
- Spouse: Sam Champion (m. 2012)
- Website: rubemrobierb.com

Rubem Robierb (born 1976) is a Miami, Florida-based visual artist, sculptor and photographer. His works have earned the attention of the media and art critics, been presented in exhibitions, at art galleries and museums around the world. The artist often uses metaphors to create overflowing images filled with hidden meanings for the viewer. His art is closely associated with the Pop art movement.

== Early life and education ==
Rubem Robierb was born in Bacabal, Maranhão, Brazil. As a child, he developed an early interest in poetry and photography and how images can affect the viewer in an emotional sense. At the age of twenty, Robierb moved to São Paulo to enroll in photography school but instead, he began to do commercial photography for fashion magazines. He later moved to the United States, where he is currently residing and working in his Miami Beach studio. According to Luxe Magazine, Robierb was inspired by works of Jean-Michel Basquiat and Andy Warhol.

== Career ==
Robierb's work first caught the attention of the Art et Partage Association, which in 2005 organized his first solo exhibition, Brezil Autrement (Another Brazil) in Aix-en-Provence, France. Subsequently, his photography work was exhibited in São Paulo, Zurich, Monaco, Paris and Milan galleries. In 2008, Robierb moved to Miami, where he opened a studio in Wynwood. In 2009 he took part in Red Dot (Art Basel) with Eros / Thanatos series, a group of images in which the artist researched the thin boundary that exists in human sexuality, between ecstasy and suffering. In 2011, he exhibited Show Me the Money series at Curators Voice Art Gallery in MIAMI, in which he crushed dollar bills and photographed then against a solid black background, creating deceptive images for viewer's perception by applying Hermann Rorschach's technique of inkblots. In 2012 Robierb had a debut exhibition in New York City art scene at Emmanuel Freming Gallery with Bullet-Fly Effect series, – a set of compositions that fused the body of a butterfly with war materials like bullets or machine guns. The main theme of the exhibition was criticism of war with allusion to the "butterfly effect" in the Chaos Theory. In 2013, he held the Bullets & Butterflies exhibition at Taglialatella Gallery on the same theme but this time with a series of paintings instead of photographs. In 2015, Robierb was commissioned by the city council of Fort Lauderdale to paint Metamorph-Us, a large mural in the downtown area.

On November 4, 2019, Robierb's sculpture Dandara (Dream Machines Series) went viral after it was unveiled in Tribeca Park, New York City. The sculpture was named after a 42-year-old transgender woman who two years earlier was brutally attacked and murdered in Brazil. As Forbes noted, "Robierb dedicated his latest sculpture to the transgender, gender non-conforming and non-binary community “in tribute to its strength and bravery." Dandara was featured in several notable media sources. His another artwork, "Climate Meltdown" also gained attention of the art critics and journalists in December 2019, after Robierb created a 36-foot display of "How Dare You" words carved out of two tons of ice that floated in water at a hotel's pool. As a number of sources stated, the artist had been inspired by the Swedish activist Greta Thunberg's notable speech at the UN, and later used the words "How Dare You" for his "Climate Meltdown" artwork. The work was also exhibited at Art Basel Miami Beach.

== Personal life ==
Rubem Robierb and Sam Champion, his partner of several years and a weather anchor for WABC-TV, Weather Channel and Good Morning America, married in 2012. Both Robierb and Champion have been strong advocates for equal marriage, actively supporting GLAAD, HRC (human rights campaign), Point Foundation and the LGBTQ Task Force, as well as Power my Learning, Big Brother Big Sisters and Best Buddies among others.

== Individual exhibitions ==
- 2019 "Climate Meltdown", Arte Fundamental Gallery (Miami, USA)
- 2018 "Metamosphosis", Sagamore Hotel (Miami, USA)
- 2018 "Metamosphosis", Taglialatella Galleries (New York, USA)
- 2018 "Metamosphosis", Taglialatella Galleries (Toronto, Canada)
- 2018 "Metamosphosis", Taglialatella Galleries (Paris, France)
- 2017 "And The Truth Will Set You Free", Arte Fundamental Gallery (Miami, USA)
- 2017 "Rubem Robierb New Works", Octavia Gallery (Houston, USA)
- 2017 "Rubem Robierb New Works", Octavia Gallery (New Orleans, USA)
- 2016 "Rubem Robierb New Works", Taglialatella Galleries (New York, USA)
- 2015 Metamorph-Us, Fort Lauderdale, USA 2015 "HeArt" Gallery 212 (Aspen, USA)
- 2014 "F-Light" (Atlanta, USA)
- 2013 "Bullets and Butterflies", Taglialatella Galleries (New York, USA)
- 2012 "Bullet-Fly Effect", Emmanuel Fremin Gallery (New York, USA)
- 2011 "Show Me the Money", Curators Voice Gallery, Miami, USA
- 2009 "Eros/Thanatos", Curators Voice Gallery (Miami, USA)
- 2006 "Brésil Autrement", Institute Alliance Française (São Paulo, Brazil)
- 2006 "Brésil Autrement", Ilana Gallery (Paris, France)
- 2006 "Brésil Autrement", The Image House Gallery (Zurich, Switzerland)
- 2006 "Brésil Autrement", Institute Alliance Française (São Paulo, Brazil)
- 2005 "Brésil Autrement", IBRIT Instituto Brasile-Italia (Milano, Italy)
- 2005 "Brésil Autrement", Space D´Art Sextius (Aix-en-Provence, France)

== Awards ==
- Eros/Thanatos in Category Fine Art – Nudes
- Pop Saints in Category Fine Art – Collage
- Show Me the Money in Category Fine Art – Still Life
- Bullet-Fly Effect in Category Fine Art – Collage
- Casa das Minas in Category People – Culture
- Casa das Minas in Category People – Lifestyle
- Centauro in Category People – Self-Portrait
- 2012 Honorable Mentions, International Photography Awards (Los Angeles, California 2012):
- Eros/Thanatos Serie – Category Fine Art: Nudes
- Pop Saints Serie – Category Fine Art: Collage
- Show Me the Money Serie – Category Fine Art: Still Life
- Bullet-Fly Effect Serie – Category Fine Art: Collage
- Casa das Minas Serie – Category People: Culture
- Casa das Minas Serie – Category People: Lifestyle
- See Serie – Category Fine Art: Portrait
- See Serie – Category People: Portrait
- Centauro – Category People: Self-Portrait
