= Dreams Come True (American non-profit) =

- Formation: 1984
- Type: NGO
- Legal status: Foundation
- Headquarters: (United States) Jacksonville, Florida
- Region served: Duval County, Florida
- Associate Director: Lauren Weedon Hopkins
- Main organ: Board of Directors
- Website: www.dreamscometrue.org

Dreams Come True (DCT) is a 501(c)(3) non-profit organization in Jacksonville, Florida, begun by Tom McGehee and his wife Delia, that grants the dreams (within certain parameters) of children with life-limiting illnesses. In 2009, according to their mainpage, the organization celebrated a quarter century of service and over 2,500 dreams fulfilled.

== History ==
In 1984, McGehee, co-founder of Mac Papers, learned about George Lee, a 17-year-old with cystic fibrosis. Lee's dream was to play with golfer Fred Couples, and the McGehees fulfilled George's dream. Lee died less than a year later, but was buried with a driver given to him by Couples. McGehee presented the idea of a charitable group that fulfills the wishes of children with terminal conditions to local business leaders, including Hugh Jones, chairman of Barnett Bank; Jay Stein and Jack Williams of Stein Mart; and Dr. Roy Baker, chairman of University Medical Center. They supported the concept, and Dreams Come True was created. At the time, McGehee owned television station channel 47, and the charity began work in an empty office there.

Laine Silverfield was the first employee, hired to work part-time in 1988. The budget was $30,000 and in the first four years, they arranged the dreams of about nine children per year. Over 20 years, she was named executive director, then later, president of the board of directors.

When Tom McGehee died in 2002, DCT had granted the dreams of 1,275 children. According to Suzanne Crittenden, former DCT associate director, "His promise to every child was that 'if you have a life-threatening illness, you will have a dream come true.' He left a big void, but he's charged Dreams Come True with quite a mission." In the next seven years, the organization nearly doubled the number of dreams fulfilled in the previous 18 years.

A new home built for the organization was dedicated on September 3, 2002, in honor of Tom McGehee. The 4,600-square-foot facility at Southpoint Parkway was virtually free of cost to the non-profit. The land, construction material and labor were donated by businesses.

Ms. Silverfield, who retired in 2008, had been the first director until she was named president following McGehee's death. Suzanne Crittenden replaced Silverfield as executive director and served until Florida Times-Union business writer Karen Brune Mathis replaced Ms. Crittenden in 2008. In 2010, Karen Brune Mathis returned to reporting as the managing editor for the Jacksonville Financial News and Daily Record. Currently Jimmy Kelly serves as executive director.

== Program ==
Dreams Come True is the only locally based nonprofit organization in Jacksonville, Florida, dedicated to fulfilling the dreams of local children battling life-threatening illnesses.

=== Eligibility ===
The organization serves children from 2 1/2 up to age 18 who have a life-threatening illness such as AIDS, cancer, cystic fibrosis, heart disease, leukemia, muscular dystrophy or kidney dysfunction. They must be referred by their physician and live in or be treated in northeast Florida or southeast Georgia.

=== Dreams ===
The most common dream for young children is going to Disneyworld. Other activities have included swimming with dolphins, meeting celebrities, big game fishing, seeing the volcanoes of Hawaii, a glacier in Alaska, going on a shopping spree, taking a cruise and touring Washington, D.C. or New York City. These days, an average dream costs $4,600.

Each child can only be granted one dream, but the organization invites past recipients to special events, such as their "Children of Christmas" Party. In 2009, the 19th annual celebration was held at a CiCi's Pizza and a large section of the parking lot was blocked off for a display of Jacksonville Sheriff's Office police cars and motorcycles; Jacksonville Fire and Rescue Department fire engines, rescue units and a mobile command center; but the highlight was the arrival of Shands Jacksonville's Trauma One helicopter

These special events are part of the organizations Special Times Program. Special Times provides the dream child and his or her family a time to momentarily forget the realities of life-threatening illnesses. It may be dinner at a favorite restaurant, tickets to a Jacksonville Jaguars game, a relaxing evening at the movies, a day of beauty, concert or theater tickets, a gift certificate to a store, new release DVDs or even a special holiday or birthday treat. Whatever the opportunity, Special Times reminds the children and their families that they are special and loved.

=== Purpose ===
Having a dream fulfilled gives a child and their family a reprieve from the necessary medical treatment that these children must endure. It can give hope and create memories that help carry them through difficult times. A child's attitude toward treatment can be dramatically impacted by having a dream fulfilled, according to medical professionals.

=== Performance ===
In 2009, Dreams Come True received Charity Navigator's highest 4-star rating for sound fiscal management for the fifth consecutive year. Only 4% of the nonprofits Charity Navigator rates have received at least 5 consecutive 4-star evaluations.

Charity Navigator evaluates non-profit performance and rates organizations.

== Kids Helping Kids ==
Kids Helping Kids is a special program that unites groups of young people with dream recipients. There have been more than 30 schools, clubs and youth groups from civic, religious and service organizations that raised and donated funds. After the group reaches their goal, a Celebration of Life dream party is held, where members of the group meet the dream child they sponsored. Many groups have continued to provide ongoing support for other dreams.

== Internal restrictions ==
The organization receives no funding from federal or state government agencies. The local United Way provides some support, but the majority comes from individuals, organizations and sponsoring businesses. DCT does not solicit contributions by telephone and it is against their policy to telemarket to raise funds.
