= Sam Champion =

American weather anchor

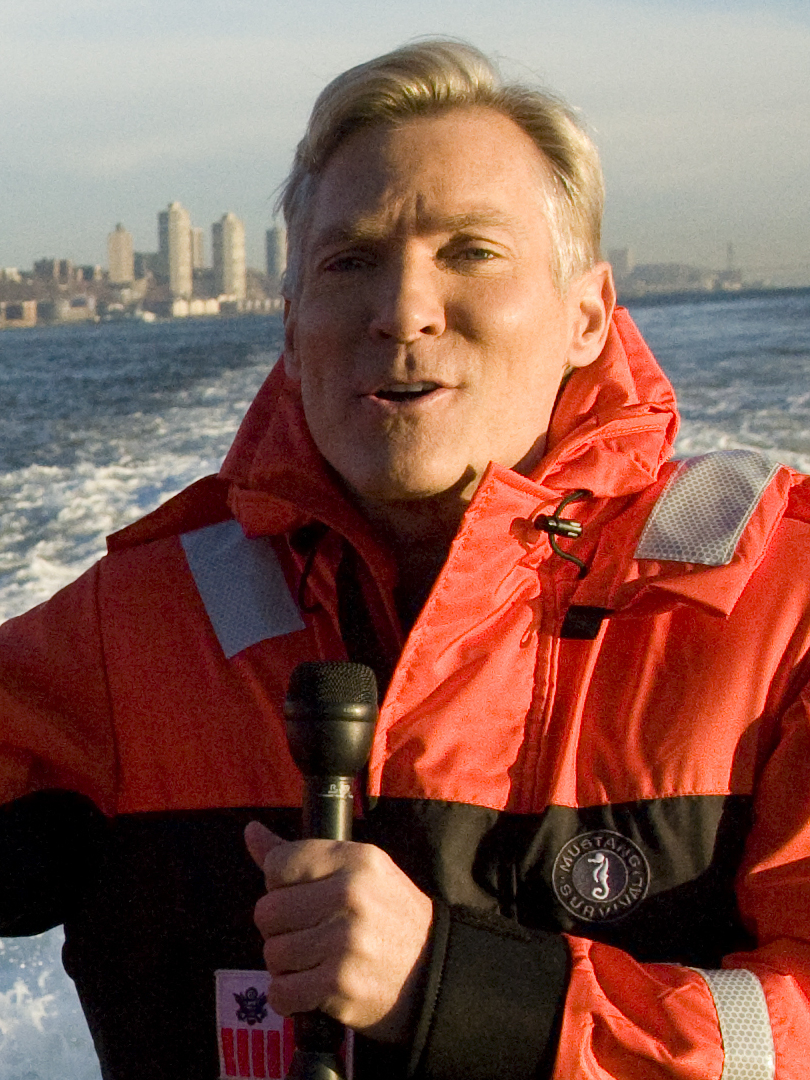
- Champion in 2012
- Born: Samuel James Champion; August 13, 1961 (age 65); Paducah, Kentucky, U.S.
- Education: Eastern Kentucky University (B.A.)
- Occupations: Weather Anchor, Television host
- Years active: 1988–present
- Title: Weather presenter
- Spouse: Rubem Robierb (m. 2012)

Samuel James Champion (born August 13, 1961) is an American weather anchor with WABC-TV and Good Morning America. He formerly co-anchored AMHQ: America's Morning Headquarters and 23.5 Degrees With Sam Champion on The Weather Channel.

After December 4, 2013, his final day with ABC, he became the managing editor of The Weather Channel, beginning on January 1, 2014. Champion also appeared on the Today show on NBC. After leaving NBC and the Weather Channel in 2016, he returned to ABC on a fill-in basis and returned to become the weekday morning weather anchor at WABC-TV in June 2019.

== Early life and education ==
Champion was born on August 13, 1961, in Paducah, Kentucky, to Sylvia and James H. Champion. He has one sibling, sister Teresa. His father, who died October 25, 2010, was a lieutenant colonel in the U.S. Marine Corps who served in Vietnam. Sam Champion graduated from Fairfax High School in Fairfax, Virginia in 1979. He has a B.A. in broadcast news from Eastern Kentucky University, and interned at WKYT-TV in Lexington, Kentucky.

== Career ==
Champion worked at WPSD-TV in Paducah, Kentucky, and WJKS (later WCWJ) in Jacksonville, Florida. He became a weather presenter for WABC-TV's Eyewitness News in New York City in 1988. During the Blizzard of '96, Champion received several name checks from David Letterman during the latter's CBS show. Shortly after joining WABC in 1988, he began filling in for Spencer Christian on Good Morning America, Champion also subbed for Tony Perkins and Mike Barz. Champion went on Good Morning America at a salary in 2004 of $1.5 million per year. On April 7, 2012, he debuted as host of Sea Rescue, an educational and informational program in Litton's Weekend Adventure that focuses on the rescue, rehabilitation, and in many instances release of animals back into wildlife.

In August 2006, Good Morning America announced Champion would join that show and ABC News, effective September 5, 2006. Champion announced his departure from ABC on December 2, 2013, to become an on-air presence at and managing editor of The Weather Channel. His last day on Good Morning America was December 4, 2013, with Ginger Zee moving from GMA's weekend shows to become his successor.

He had occasionally appeared on Live with Kelly and Ryan, the daily talk show produced by WABC-TV, and CNN's Larry King Live. He often begins his 30-second weathercasts by saying, "Let's get to the boards." His catchphrase when breaking for weather reports from local ABC stations is, "That's the weather around the nation. Here's what you can expect this morning."

Immediately following his departure from GMA, it was announced that Champion would join The Weather Channel to host his own morning show, titled America's Morning Headquarters which debuted on March 17, 2014. In September 2015, it was revealed that Champion would leave AMHQ to serve as a contributor to its primetime programs. In December 2016, Champion and The Weather Channel decided not to renew their contract. As a result, Champion left the company on December 27, 2016.

He returned to ABC as a fill-in Good Morning America meteorologist while Zee was on maternity leave in 2018. On May 22, 2019, it was announced that Champion would be returning to WABC-TV's morning and noon newscasts, and be a featured contributor to ABC News, beginning June 3, 2019. Champion continues to appear on Good Morning America occasionally as well as filling in for Zee.

On September 8, 2022, Champion was announced as a contestant on season 31 of Dancing with the Stars, partnered with Cheryl Burke. They were eliminated in week 4, placing 13th out of 16 contestants.

== Personal life ==
Champion is active in charitable organizations in the New York metropolitan area. He was the grand marshal of the Multiple Sclerosis Society Fall Bike Tour, the chairman of the 25th annual March of Dimes NYC WalkAmerica, and master of ceremonies of "Stopping AIDS Together," a part of Sunday by the Bay. He hosted the New York City Anti-Violence Project's 2002 "Courage Awards," along with movie critic Frank DeCaro.

In May 2010, Champion had a basal cell carcinoma removed from his skin while on air, after previous bouts with the disease. He said he wanted to raise awareness about skin cancer during Cancer Awareness Month.

Champion and his partner of several years, Rubem Robierb, were married on December 21, 2012.

== See also ==
- LGBT culture in New York City
- List of LGBT people from New York City
- New Yorkers in journalism
- NYC Pride March
