= Good Morning America =

American morning news television show

- Genre: Morning show
- Created by: Donald L. Perris; William F. Baker; Roone Arledge
- Presented by: Robin Roberts; George Stephanopoulos; Michael Strahan; Lara Spencer; Ginger Zee; Sam Champion; Rebecca Jarvis; (See full list)
- Theme music composer: Marvin Hamlisch (1975–1987); Frank Gari (1988–1992); Non-Stop Music (1992–1996); Michael Whalen (1997–1999); Desmond Child (1999–2004); VideoHelper (2004–2006); DreamArtists Studios (2007–present)
- Country of origin: United States
- Original language: English
- No. of seasons: 50

Production
- Executive producers: Simone Swink (2021–present); Michael Corn (2014–2021); Roxanna Sherwood (2017–2020); James Goldston (2011–2014)
- Production locations: ABC News Headquarters, New York City (1975–1999); Times Square Studios, New York City (1999–2025); Studio C, 7 Hudson Square, New York City (2025–present)
- Camera setup: Multi-camera
- Running time: 120 minutes
- Production company: ABC News Productions

Original release
- Network: ABC
- Release: November 3, 1975 – present

Related
- AM America; Good Morning America First Look

Good Morning America, commonly known as GMA, is an American morning television program that is broadcast on ABC. It debuted on November 3, 1975, and first expanded to weekends with the debut of a Sunday edition on January 3, 1993. The Sunday edition was canceled in 1999; weekend editions returned on both Saturdays and Sundays on September 4, 2004. The weekday and Saturday programs air from 7:00 a.m. to 9:00 a.m. in all United States timezones (live in the Eastern Time Zone and on broadcast delay elsewhere across the country, in markets that serve areas in both ET and CT such as Columbus, GA, the show airs at 6am CT). The Sunday editions are an hour long and are transmitted to ABC's stations live at 7:00 a.m. Eastern Time, although stations in some media markets air them at different times. Viewers in the Pacific Time Zone receive an updated feed with a specialized opening and updated live reports. A third hour of the weekday broadcast aired from 2007 to 2008, exclusively on ABC News Now.

The program features news, interviews, weather forecasts, special-interest stories, and feature segments such as "Pop News" (featuring popular culture and entertainment news, and viral video), the "GMA Heat Index" (featuring a mix of entertainment, lifestyle and human-interest stories) and "Play of the Day" (featuring a selected viral video or television program clip). It is produced by ABC News and broadcasts from Studio C at 7 Hudson Square in New York City's Hudson Square neighborhood. The primary anchors are Robin Roberts, George Stephanopoulos, and former New York Giants defensive end and former Live co-host Michael Strahan with Rebecca Jarvis Friday co-host, entertainment anchor Lara Spencer and weather anchor Ginger Zee.

Good Morning America has been the most watched morning show in total viewers and key demos each year since summer 2012. GMA generally placed second in the ratings, behind NBC's Today, from 1995 to 2012. It overtook its rival for a period from the early to mid-1980s with anchors David Hartman and Joan Lunden, from the late 1980s to the mid-1990s with Charles Gibson and Lunden, and in April 2012 with Roberts and Stephanopoulos.

Good Morning America won the first three Daytime Emmy Awards for Outstanding Morning Program, sharing the inaugural 2007 award with Today and winning the 2008 and 2009 awards outright.

== History ==
=== 1975: The inaugural year ===
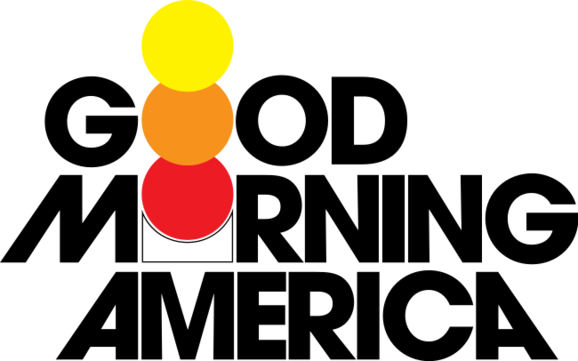
First logo for Good Morning America, used from 1975 to 1987

logo used from 2021 to 2022

On January 6, 1975, ABC launched AM America in an attempt to compete with NBC's Today. The program was hosted by Bill Beutel and Stephanie Edwards, with Peter Jennings reading the news (Jennings had been a replacement for Bob Kennedy, who had been scheduled to be the program's newsreader, but died two months before the premiere from bone cancer). Because the show could not find an audience against Today (and its anchor team of Jim Hartz and Barbara Walters), ABC sought a new approach. The network found that one of its affiliates, WEWS in Cleveland, Ohio, had been pre-empting AM America in favor of airing a locally produced show called The Morning Exchange.

Unlike AM America and Today, The Morning Exchange featured an easygoing and less dramatic approach by offering news and weather updates only at the top and bottom of every hour and using the rest of the time to discuss general interest/entertainment topics. The Morning Exchange also established a group of regular guests who were experts in certain fields, including health, entertainment, consumer affairs, and travel. Also unlike both the NBC and ABC shows, The Morning Exchange was not broadcast from a newsroom set but instead one that resembled a suburban living room.

In the process of screening the Cleveland morning program as a creative source, ABC also began looking at another local show, Good Morning!, which was produced by Boston ABC affiliate WCVB-TV. Good Morning! was very similar in format to The Morning Exchange, but with a lesser emphasis on news and weather. In fact, once the revamped ABC morning show took to the air late in 1975 under the title Good Morning America, WCVB station manager Bob Bennett accused ABC entertainment president Fred Silverman of deliberately stealing the title of Good Morning!; no legal cease and desist action was finalized against ABC in the matter, however. The launch of Good Morning America did result in the Boston morning show changing its name—to Good Day!. Currently, WCVB's morning news program is titled EyeOpener.

ABC took an episode of The Morning Exchange and used it as a television pilot. The format replaced AM America on Monday, November 3, as Good Morning America. The first cohosts were actor David Hartman and actress Nancy Dussault. Dussault was replaced on April 25, 1977, by Sandy Hill, previously at KABC-TV in Los Angeles. The show's title is taken from the beginning of the chorus of Steve Goodman's song "City of New Orleans" (made famous by Arlo Guthrie).

For the first seven years, weather forecasts were presented by John Coleman, former chief meteorologist for ABC owned-and-operated station WLS-TV in Chicago, who left GMA in 1982 to start The Weather Channel with Landmark Communications CEO Frank Batten. Dave Murray (later chief meteorologist at KTVI in St. Louis) provided the forecasts for both Good Morning America and ABC's early morning news program ABC News This Morning from 1983 to 1986. In August 1986, he was replaced by Spencer Christian, who worked at WABC-TV in New York City and served as fill-in meteorologist for both Coleman and Murray whenever they were away on vacation or assignment.

=== 1976–1989: Growth and change ===
The program's Nielsen ratings climbed slowly, but steadily throughout the 1970s and into the 1980s while Today experienced a slight slump in viewership, especially with Walters' decision to leave NBC for a job at ABC News. On August 30, 1976, Tom Brokaw began anchoring Today while the program began a search for a female co-host. Within a year, Today managed to beat back the Good Morning America ratings threat with Brokaw and new co-host Jane Pauley, featuring art and entertainment contributor Gene Shalit. Good Morning America continued to threaten Today's ratings dominance into the 1980s, especially after Brokaw left the latter program to become co-anchor of NBC Nightly News with Roger Mudd for 17 months before being named sole anchor of that program. For the first time, Good Morning America became the highest-rated morning news program in the United States as Today fell to second place.

At the outset, Good Morning America was a talk program with a main host, Hartman, who was joined by a sidekick co-host; Dussault and Hill were scripted as less-than-equal hosts. In 1980, an exasperated Hill left Good Morning America after run-ins with Hartman, who was said to have "had a problem with strong women". She was replaced by Joan Lunden, then a reporter at ABC's New York City flagship WABC-TV on August 28, 1980. Hartman and Lunden led the show through several years of success. Lunden's popularity led to her promotion to co-anchor in 1986, and to more equal footing with Hartman than any woman before her. The partnership ended on February 20, 1987, when Hartman retired after 3,189 broadcasts.

After Hartman's departure, Lunden was paired with ABC News correspondent Charles Gibson on February 23, 1987, which ultimately resulted in ratings for the program skyrocketing. The team of Lunden and Gibson became the most popular news partnership on television in the late 1980s and early 1990s, and for the first time Good Morning America regularly won the ratings against Today. At one point prior to Spencer Christian's arrival in 1986, forecasts on the program were provided by WXYZ-TV chief meteorologist Jerry Hodak via a split screen between the WXYZ studios in Detroit and the Good Morning America set in New York City.

=== 1990–1998: Rise and decline ===
Good Morning America entered the 1990s with continued overwhelming ratings success. Gibson and Lunden became a hard team to beat; however, the program stumbled from its top spot in late 1995, falling to second place behind Today (in what would begin a 16-year streak as the top-rated morning news program for that show, which began the week of December 11, 1995). Lunden began to discuss working less and mentioned to network executives that the morning schedule is the hardest in the business. ABC executives promised Lunden that a prime time program; Behind Closed Doors would premiere on the network in 1996.

On September 5, 1997, Lunden decided to step down as host of Good Morning America after 17 years and was replaced by ABC News correspondent Lisa McRee. The pairing of Gibson and McRee fared well in the ratings. However, ratings sharply declined when Gibson also left the show to make way for Kevin Newman on May 1, 1998. With McRee and Newman as anchors, longtime viewers of Good Morning America switched to Today, whose ratings skyrocketed.

=== January 1999 – May 2005: Gibson–Sawyer ===
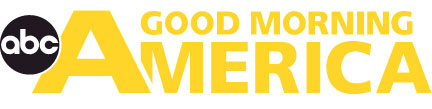
Logo used from 2002 to 2006

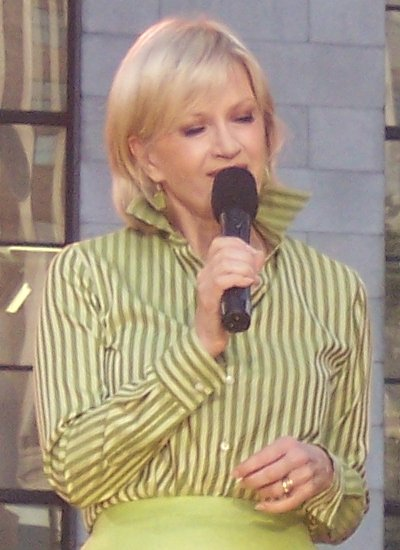
Diane Sawyer on set in 2004

To improve Good Morning America's ratings performance, which briefly fell to third place among the morning shows in January 1999, ABC News management selected Shelley Ross from the field of executive producer candidates. As part of Rossʼs proposed changes, Ross ousted the McRee-Newman team and lobbied to bring in Diane Sawyer and team her with Charles Gibson, who had been reluctant to return. On January 18, 1999, the Gibson-Sawyer team paired by Ross debuted on-air, which during the first full season resulted in a dramatic increase in viewership while all other network news franchises saw losses.

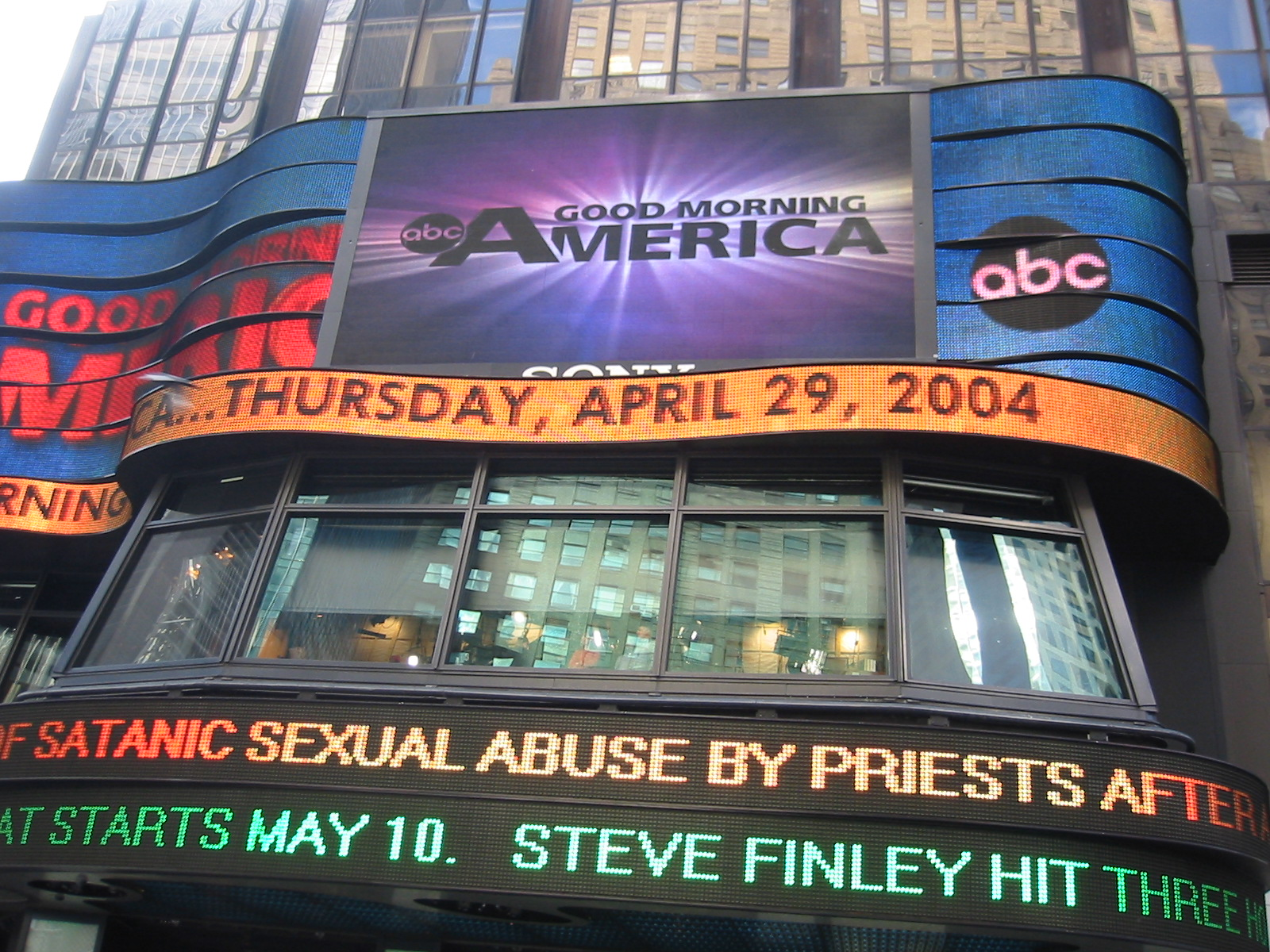
Outside of Times Square Studios in 2004

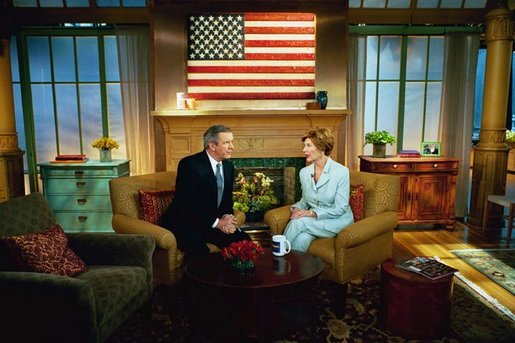
Charlie Gibson interviewing First Lady Laura Bush in 2004

The show moved from the ABC News headquarters in Manhattan's Lincoln Square district to its present home at the Times Square Studios on September 13, 1999. The new location made it possible for the program to feature a live audience inside the studio, similar to the "Window on the World" set used by Today. Under Ross, Good Morning America became a competitive 24/7 news operation with more exclusive bookings, news and live stock market updates for West Coast viewers and new on-screen graphics that included a news ticker. Good Morning America began originating entire shows from unique locations, which, according to Nielsen Media Research, resulted in more people watching the program and for longer periods of time. GMA became the first to originate a live show from an aircraft carrier during wartime (the USS Enterprise), from the White House (after the Columbine High School massacre), from The Pentagon (for the reopening of the wing damaged during the September 11 attacks in 2001), from The Vatican (for the 25th anniversary of Pope John Paul II's election as Pope), and from the Tower of London (on the 50th anniversary of Elizabeth IIʼs accession to the throne). Viewership during this time increased by nearly one million households, and revenue soared.

Although Today remained the top-rated morning news show, the Sawyer, Gibson and Ross team inched close, creating a viable rival. According to Linda McLoof, executive director of news research at ABC News from 2001 to 2009, "When Shelley left, her viewing momentum was initially sustained, but a season later, the audience began to decline. It is like passing the baton in a relay race." Antonio Mora served as newsreader for the program until March 18, 2002, when he left to become an anchor at CBS owned-and-operated station WBBM-TV in Chicago. He was replaced by former ESPN anchor and correspondent Robin Roberts.

=== May 2005 – June 2006: Gibson–Sawyer–Roberts ===
On May 23, 2005, ABC News announced that Robin Roberts would be promoted from newsreader to co-anchor of Good Morning America, joining Gibson and Sawyer. Roberts had previously served as a regular substitute for Gibson and Sawyer when either of them were on vacation or assignment. On November 3, 2005, Good Morning America celebrated its 30th anniversary with retrospectives on and clips from the show's history and by decorating Times Square. Former co-hosts Hartman and Lunden, along with former meteorologist Spencer Christian, were among the guests of honor. Hartman signed off the show that day with his trademark close: "From all of us, make it a good day." That same day, Good Morning America became the first network morning news program to begin broadcasting in high-definition television.

On December 2, 2005, weather anchor Tony Perkins left the program after six years. The last ten minutes of that day's edition were dedicated to Perkins, during which he gave thanks to one of the show's producers and a heartfelt goodbye to anchors Gibson, Roberts and Sawyer. Perkins left the program to return to his family in Washington, D.C., and join Fox owned-and-operated station WTTG, where he previously served as a weather anchor. He affectionately said to his young son on-air, "Connor, if you're watching, daddy's comin' home." Perkins was replaced by Mike Barz, former WGN Morning News sports anchor at WGN-TV in Chicago.

Gibson left Good Morning America for the second time on June 28, 2006. That day's edition was dedicated to his 19 years as anchor of the program and celebrated his new role as anchor of ABC World News Tonight. Gibson ended his tenure at GMA by stating, "For nineteen years, my mornings have been not just good—they've been great."

=== June 2006 – December 2009: Sawyer–Roberts ===
There had been speculation that Sawyer would leave Good Morning America when her contract expired in 2007 to assume the anchor position at ABC World News that was given to Gibson. In August 2006, Chris Cuomo was named news anchor while continuing his anchoring duties on the newsmagazine Primetime and serving as ABC News's senior legal correspondent. Meanwhile, Sam Champion, longtime evening meteorologist at WABC-TV, was named as the new weather anchor for the program and as weather editor for ABC News. Both Cuomo and Champion began their respective duties on the program on September 5, 2006, when Good Morning America instituted a new graphics package and new news area for Cuomo to report headlines. The following week, on September 13, 2006, the program introduced a new logo—this time with gold Avant Garde font on a blue background, which bears a resemblance to the original Good Morning America logo that was used up to early 1987.

On June 29, 2007, the program's longtime film critic Joel Siegel died of complications from colorectal cancer at age 63. The July 9 edition of GMA was dedicated to Siegel, with former hosts Hartman, Hill, Lunden, Newman, Christian, Perkins and Gibson all appearing to share their memories. One month later, on July 31, 2007, Robin Roberts announced that she had been diagnosed with breast cancer after discovering a lump in her breast during a self-examination while preparing the Siegel tribute episode. Roberts remained as anchor while undergoing chemotherapy and completed radiation treatments on March 28, 2008.

On October 22, 2007, Good Morning America introduced a new on-air graphics package. Using much of the design features of its former graphics, it went from a basic blue background to a more orangish-gold setting. The program's opening changed from the camera's zooming in on the hosts while introducing the host to an opening with new music (by the New York City-based music production company DreamArtists Studios) and a background with the Good Morning America logo descending onto the frame. It also changed its news ticker and time-and-temperature bug for the first time in years. The ticker featured an orange background with a modified ABC News logo as a breakpoint for each headline. The bug still featured the time and current local temperature to the left, but with an orange backdrop with an alternate "GMA" logo and the ABCNews.com logo to the right.

On January 15, 2008, during an interview with Diane Sawyer on the program, actress Diane Keaton commented on Sawyer's physical attractiveness, stating that if she had lips like Sawyer's, "then I wouldn't have worked on my [expletive] personality!" Keaton quickly apologized for the remark and Sawyer jokingly threatened to have her mother "work on your personality with soap in your mouth". Officials with the Federal Communications Commission declined to take action for the fleeting expletive. Following the death of Michael Jackson, Charles Gibson returned to the Good Morning America anchor desk with Roberts on June 26, 2009, while Sawyer was away.

In September 2008, Good Morning America's anchors rode an Amtrak train to tour the United States as part of ABC News's "50 States in 50 Days" event, for which the program was broadcast from different locations around the U.S. each day throughout that month. The tour's first telecast stop was in Stockbridge, Massachusetts and featured musical guest James Taylor

=== December 2009 – April 2014: Roberts–Stephanopoulos ===
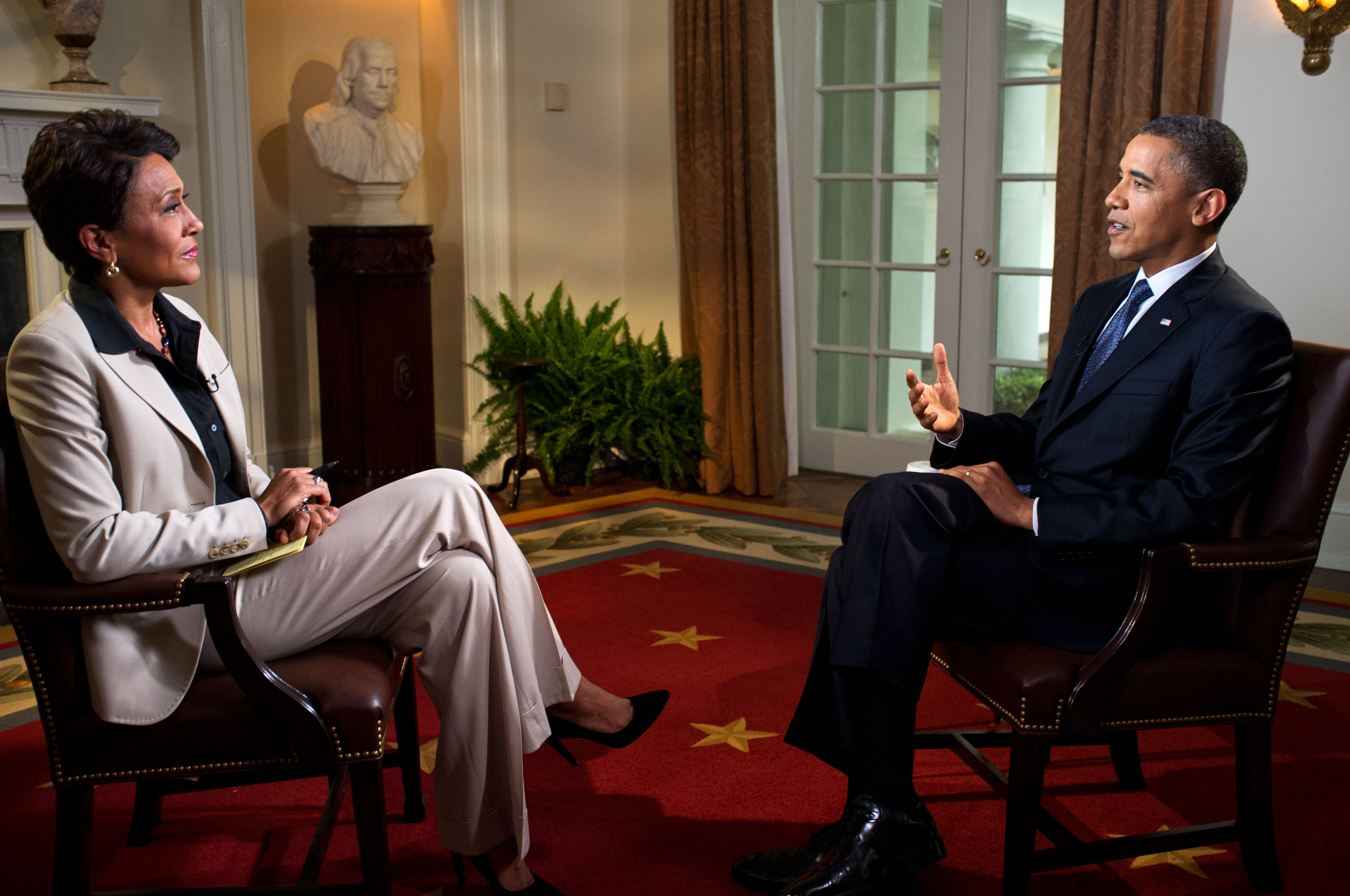
Robin Roberts interviewing President Barack Obama in the Cabinet Room of the White House, 2012

On September 2, 2009, ABC announced that Sawyer would replace Gibson as anchor of ABC World News at the end of that year. Speculation had abounded that either George Stephanopoulos, news anchor Chris Cuomo, weekend anchor Bill Weir, or World News Saturday anchor David Muir would replace Sawyer on the program. Representatives for ABC News stated that it wanted to return the show to the original male-female anchor format. On December 10, 2009, Stephanopoulos was announced as Sawyer's replacement, with Juju Chang replacing Cuomo as newsreader; the changes took effect four days later on December 14.

In April 2010, the anchor desk in the studio was relocated back in front of the window overlooking Times Square, where it had been when Good Morning America moved to the Times Square Studios facility in 1999; the news desk was also moved in front of a window. On May 3, 2010, the program debuted new "light blue and sunny" graphics, and new theme music by DreamArtists Studios. An entirely new set for the program was introduced on January 31, 2011; the monitor used for national weather segments (used mainly during the 7:00 a.m. hour only) was moved closer to the anchor desk while the news desk remained in the same place. This was the first major set change since the show upgraded to high definition in November 2005.

On February 25, 2011 James Goldston moved from Nightline to become Senior Executive Producer of GMA. On March 17, 2011, ABC News President Ben Sherwood announced that former GMA national correspondent Lara Spencer would be rejoining the program in May in a newly created lifestyle anchor position. On March 29, 2011, ESPN anchor Josh Elliott was named news anchor of the program following the departure of Juju Chang.

In the summer of 2011, Good Morning America decided to vacate the second floor of the Times Square studios, which overlooked Times Square, due to cost issues. On September 6, 2011, the program began broadcasting from an entirely new studio set located on the first floor (ground level) of the Times Square studios. The main "window" behind the presenters in the new set, which also shows a view overlooking Times Square from an above-ground level, is actually a back-projection, although there are several real windows used in other parts of the set.

Amid declining ratings at Today in the aftermath of reports of Matt Lauer's alleged role in Ann Curry's departure as co-host (though ratings had been in a steady decline for that program during Curry's co-hosting tenure), viewership for Good Morning America increased starting in 2012. The program beat Today for the first time in 16 years during the week of April 9, 2012, ending that program's streak of 852 consecutive weeks as the most-watched network morning news program, by a margin of 31,000 more viewers than the NBC program. Good Morning America beat Today once again during the week of April 16, 2012, by a much larger margin of 166,000 viewers.

During the week of April 1, 2012, ABC News special correspondent Katie Couric, who had recently joined the network as part of a deal to host a syndicated talk show distributed by corporate sister Disney–ABC Domestic Television, filled for Robin Roberts on Good Morning America. Couric had hosted the rival NBC morning program Today from 1991 to 2006; her Good Morning America stint marked her return to morning news after six years.

On August 30, 2012, Roberts went on medical leave after undergoing a bone marrow transplant (donated by her sister and fellow news anchor SallyAnn Roberts) following her diagnosis with myelodysplastic syndrome. GMA correspondent Amy Robach and 20/20 anchor Elizabeth Vargas served as the primary substitutes, typically alternating every other week. Others, including some celebrities, also served as special guest anchors during this time such as Kelly Ripa, Jessica Simpson, Barbara Walters and Elisabeth Hasselbeck. On January 14, 2013, Roberts announced that she hoped to return to the program sometime that February; Roberts performed dry run rehearsals during the week of January 21 in preparation for her return; she and her doctors evaluated her body's reaction to the makeup, the lighting, her hair, and the number of people she comes in contact with to avoid compromising her then-gradually-improving health. Roberts returned to Good Morning America part-time on February 20, 2013; she announced in August 2013 that she would return to full-time hosting duties on September 3 of that year.

In 2013, GMA won its first Nielsen ratings in 18 years. On December 4, 2013, weather anchor Sam Champion departed Good Morning America and ABC News after seven years on the program to join The Weather Channel, where he became primary anchor of the competing morning program America's Morning Headquarters (which debuted in March 2014). He was succeeded the following day by Ginger Zee, who had been serving as meteorologist for the weekend editions of GMA and was also appointed to Champion's former position as weather editor for ABC News.

On March 30, 2014, news anchor Josh Elliott left ABC News after three years as news anchor of GMA to become a correspondent for NBC Sports, amid reports that contract negotiations to increase his annual salary (from $1.2 million to $8 million) broke down; Elliott was replaced as news anchor by Amy Robach later that week. The program continued to dominate over the competition, even with the loss of two major co-hosts in Champion and Elliott.

In early April 2014, several media reports speculated that Michael Strahan would be joining GMA as a contributing anchor, while maintaining his co-host duties on Live! with Kelly and Michael (which is also syndicated by Disney–ABC Domestic Television). Strahan's new position was confirmed on April 15, 2014, when he was introduced to the audience as the new contributing anchor on the program.

=== April 2014 – September 2016: Roberts–Stephanopoulos–Spencer ===
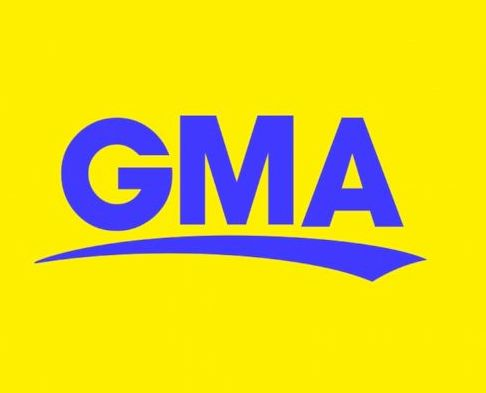
Logo used from 2006 to 2019

On April 18, 2014, Lara Spencer was promoted to co-anchor effective immediately, receiving top billing on the program alongside Roberts and Stephanopoulos.

In September 2014, former NFL player Tim Tebow was announced to be joining the program as a part-time correspondent to help launch the new segment, "Motivate Me Mondays". He made his debut on the program on September 15, 2014.

On November 19, 2015, the program celebrated its 40th anniversary, with all the main anchors and most of the news and weather anchors returning to join the celebration and share their stories. Clips from all 40 years were shown.

On April 19, 2016, Strahan announced that he would be leaving Live! with Kelly and Michael to join Good Morning America full-time.

=== September 2016–present: Roberts–Stephanopoulos–Strahan ===
On September 6, 2016, Michael Strahan began his run as official full-time co-anchor of the program along with Roberts, Stephanopoulos, and Spencer. A new title sequence was debuted not including Spencer's name. The first hour focuses on the news of the morning anchored by Roberts, Stephanopulos, and Strahan. Zee does segments of the weather and Robach reads the morning headlines. The second hour is in the second floor studio and is taped in front of a live studio audience. It focuses on "soft news" and entertainment. It is anchored by the three main co-anchors (including Spencer) and features guests and talk show panel discussion.

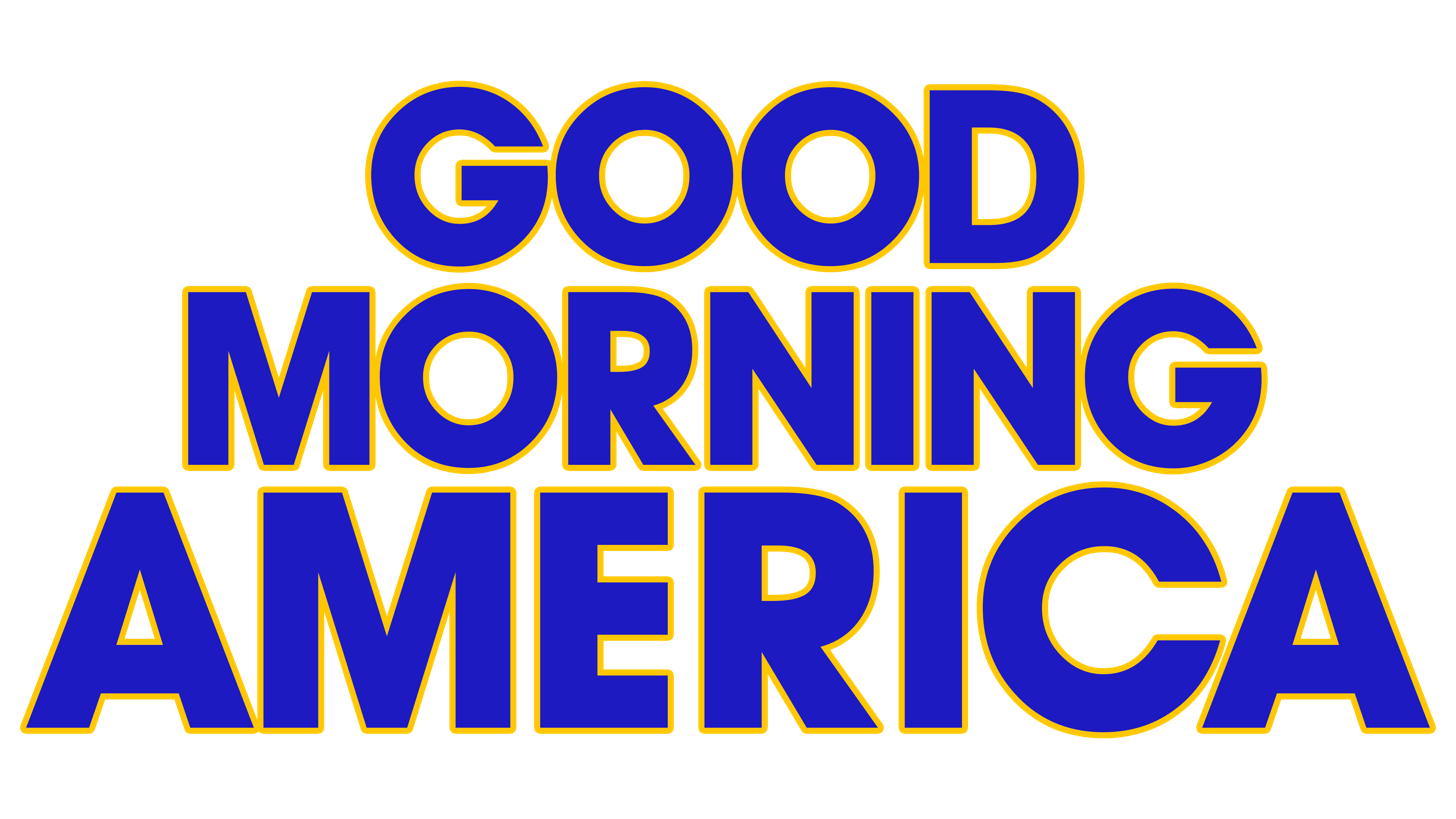
Logo used from 2022 to 2025

In April 2018, it was announced that Spencer would cut back on her hours on GMA from five days a week to three to focus on her own projects. On May 23, 2018, an afternoon extension of GMA (originally titled GMA Day, now known as GMA3) was announced as a replacement in the fall of 2018 for the cancelled cooking series The Chew in the 1:00 p.m. ET/noon CT timeslot.

In April 2022, Roberts celebrated her 20th anniversary with Good Morning America, during which an on-air celebration was held with Roberts being honored with a plaque featuring her name on the grounds of Times Square. An anthropomorphic show mascot, Ray, styled as a sun-like creature, was introduced to the viewers on September 7, 2023. In the first half of 2024, the show uncharacteristically struggled in the ratings race. It lost the demographic of adults under the age of 54 to the Today show for several months, and periodically lost the same demographic in that period to CBS Mornings.

In October 2023, it was announced that GMA (along with many of ABC News and WABC-TV's on-air studio operations) would relocate to a new Disney facility at 7 Hudson Square in Lower Manhattan. GMA officially moved on June 16, 2025, and began broadcasting out of Studio C in the new facility on the same day. As part of its relocation, a wholly new logo was unveiled for first time in 19 years that loosely resemblance to the 2002−06 Good Morning America. Additionally, a new graphics and new studios that artfully combines hard scenery, virtual set extensions and massive movable multipurpose LED units that move around on tracks was also unveiled, allowing the space to be reconfigured in a myriad of ways.

On November 3, 2025, the program celebrated its 50th anniversary. Many former anchors joined in the celebration.

== Spin-offs ==
=== Good Night America ===
Good Night America was a late night talk show/news magazine hosted by Geraldo Rivera in the 1970s as part of ABC's late night line up, also ABC's "Wide World Special". Though not exactly like GMA it was more of a talk show format, with guests and interviewing them and also topics of current events, with Rivera ending the show with commentary. After Good Night America went off the air, Rivera still worked for ABC eventually working for Good Morning America when it premiered in November 1975, while still working for ABC News and its other shows such as Nightline and 20/20.

=== Good Afternoon America ===
A special summer afternoon edition of Good Morning America, titled Good Afternoon America, premiered on July 9, 2012, as a temporary replacement for the canceled talk/lifestyle show The Revolution in the 2:00 p.m. Eastern Time weekday slot.

Good Afternoon America was taped immediately after the morning program and focused on lighter fare, with the exception of the July 20 edition, which provided live coverage of the 2012 Aurora theater shooting. Like its morning counterpart, Good Afternoon America originated from Times Square Studios. The limited-run program, which ended on September 7, 2012, was hosted by then Good Morning America news anchor Josh Elliott and lifestyle anchor Lara Spencer.

=== GMA Wake Up Call ===
GMA Wake Up Call is a pre-morning show hosted by Ginger Zee, which previews stories and features to be seen on the main show ahead for social media platforms, being posted in the half hour before broadcast.

=== GMA Lunch Break ===
GMA Lunch Break is a half-hour afternoon show airing on social media outlets between 12:00 p.m. and 1:00 p.m. also hosted by Zee. This focuses on a featured lunch recipe.

=== GMA Deals ===
GMA Deals airs on social media outlets on select days at 8:30 a.m. Hosted by Zee and Tory Johnson, it is an extension of the show's popular segment where influencers and other representatives of companies demonstrate products on-air and offer deal of the day on the offered product or service.

=== GMA3 ===
GMA3 is a spinoff/third hour of GMA that was originally hosted by Michael Strahan and Sara Haines. The show premiered on September 10, 2018, under the title of GMA Day, and later became known as GMA3 on January 28, 2019, with Strahan and Sara being the subtitle. On August 26, 2019, after filling in as a summer co-host during Haines' maternity leave, actress and singer Keke Palmer joined as a permanent third co-host and the show took the subtitle of Strahan, Sara and Keke until March 2020, when it became GMA3: What You Need to Know, an hour-long news program hosted by Amy Robach that originally covered the COVID-19 pandemic. Later in 2020, Palmer and industry insiders announced the Strahan, Sara and Keke incarnation of the program would not return and was, in effect, cancelled.

== Current on-air staff ==
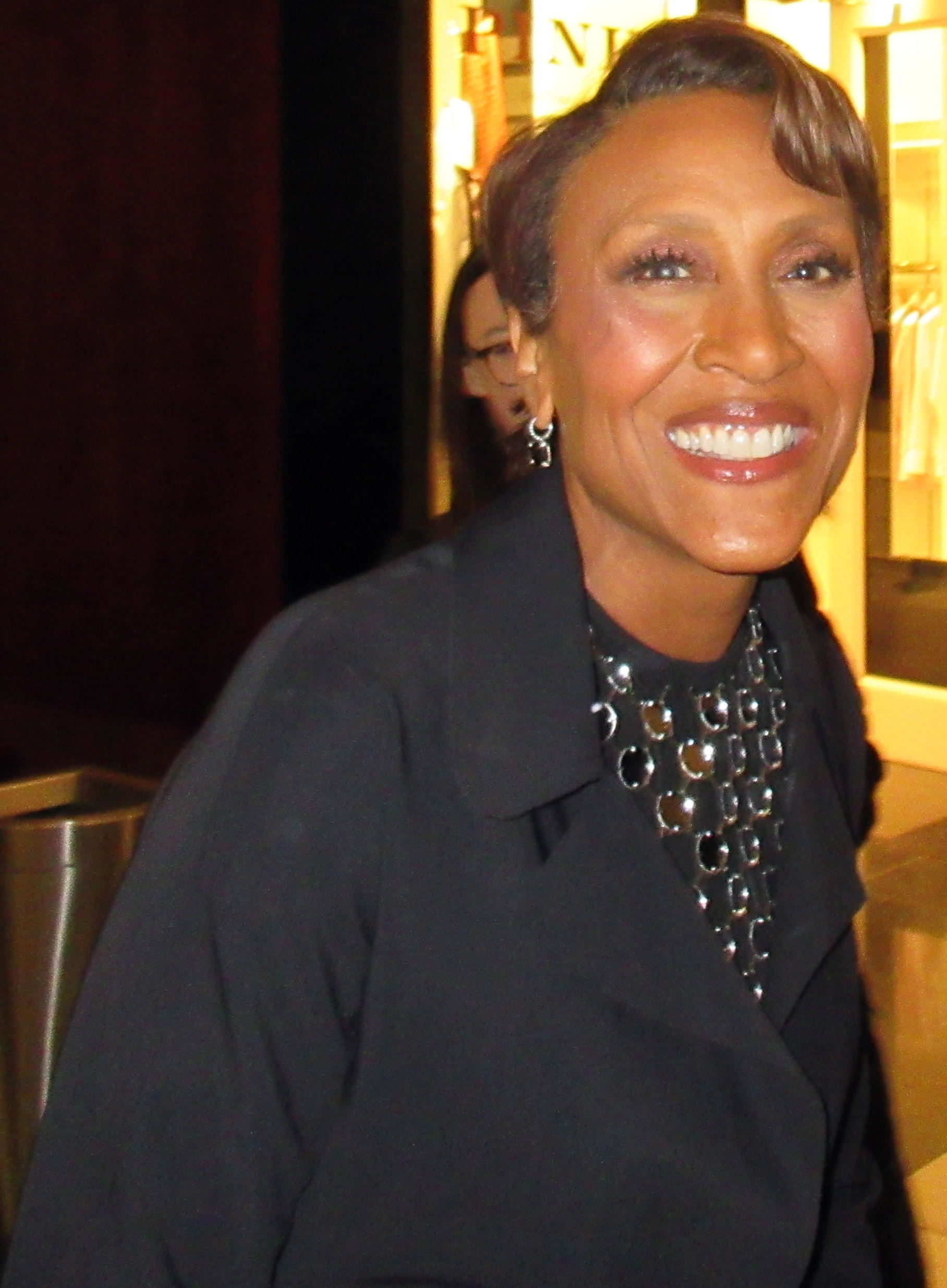
Robin Roberts
Co-Anchor; 2005–present (2002–2005 as News Anchor)

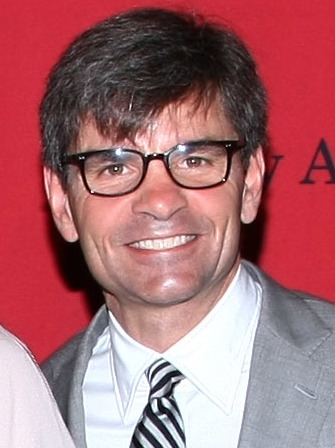
George Stephanopoulos
Co-Anchor; 2009–present

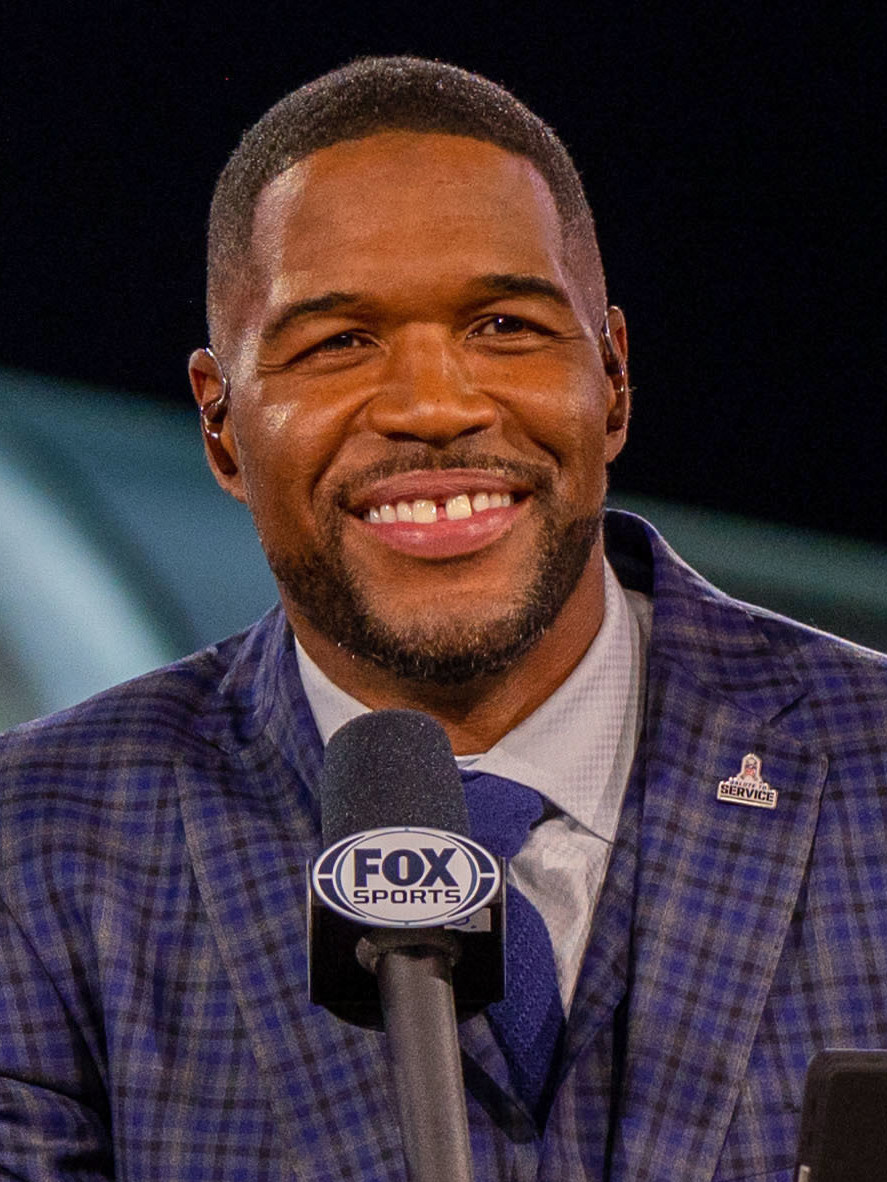
Michael Strahan
Co-Anchor; 2016–present

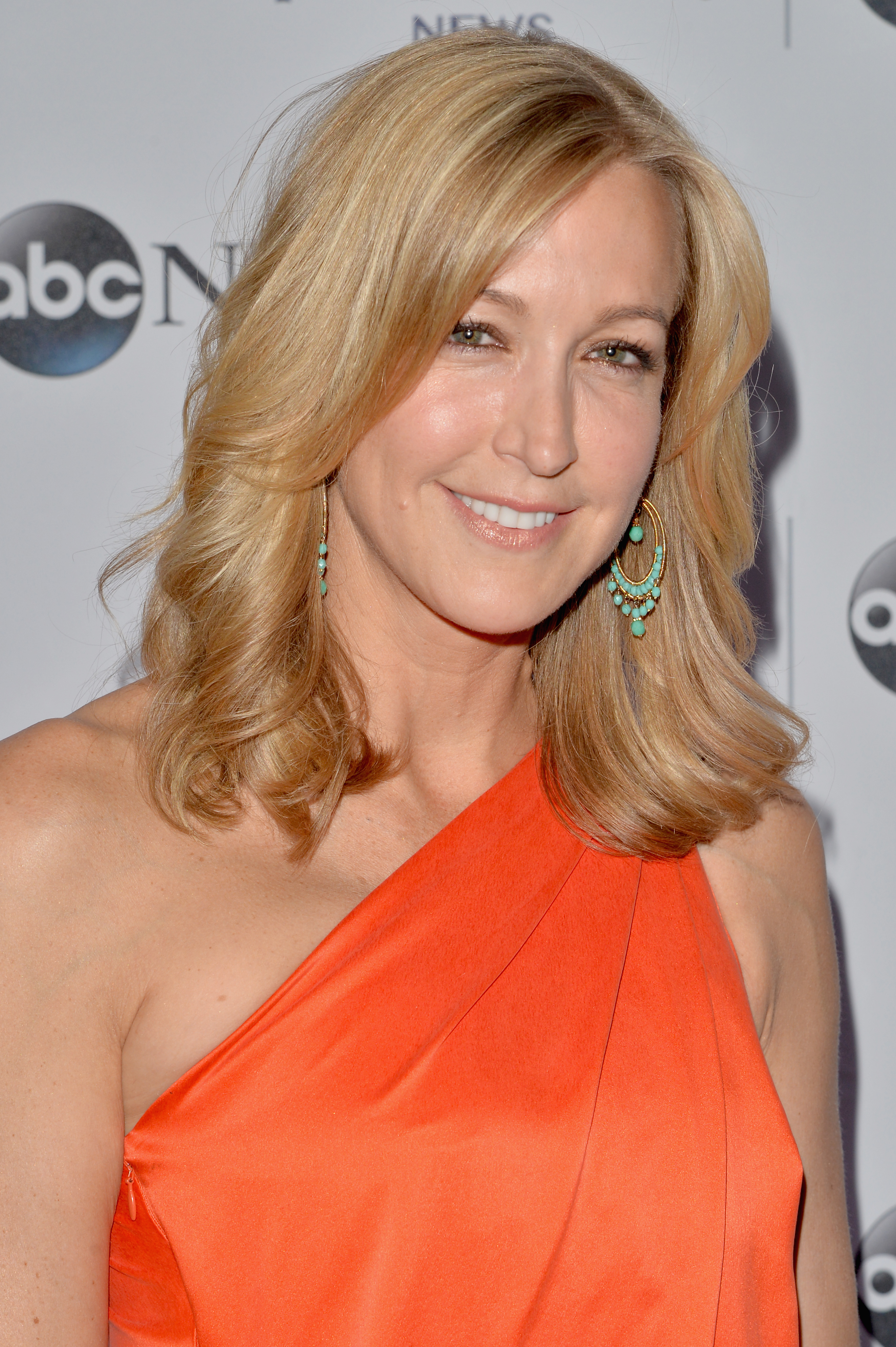
Lara Spencer
Contributor; 2018–present (Co-Host; 2011–2018) (1999–2004 as Reporter)

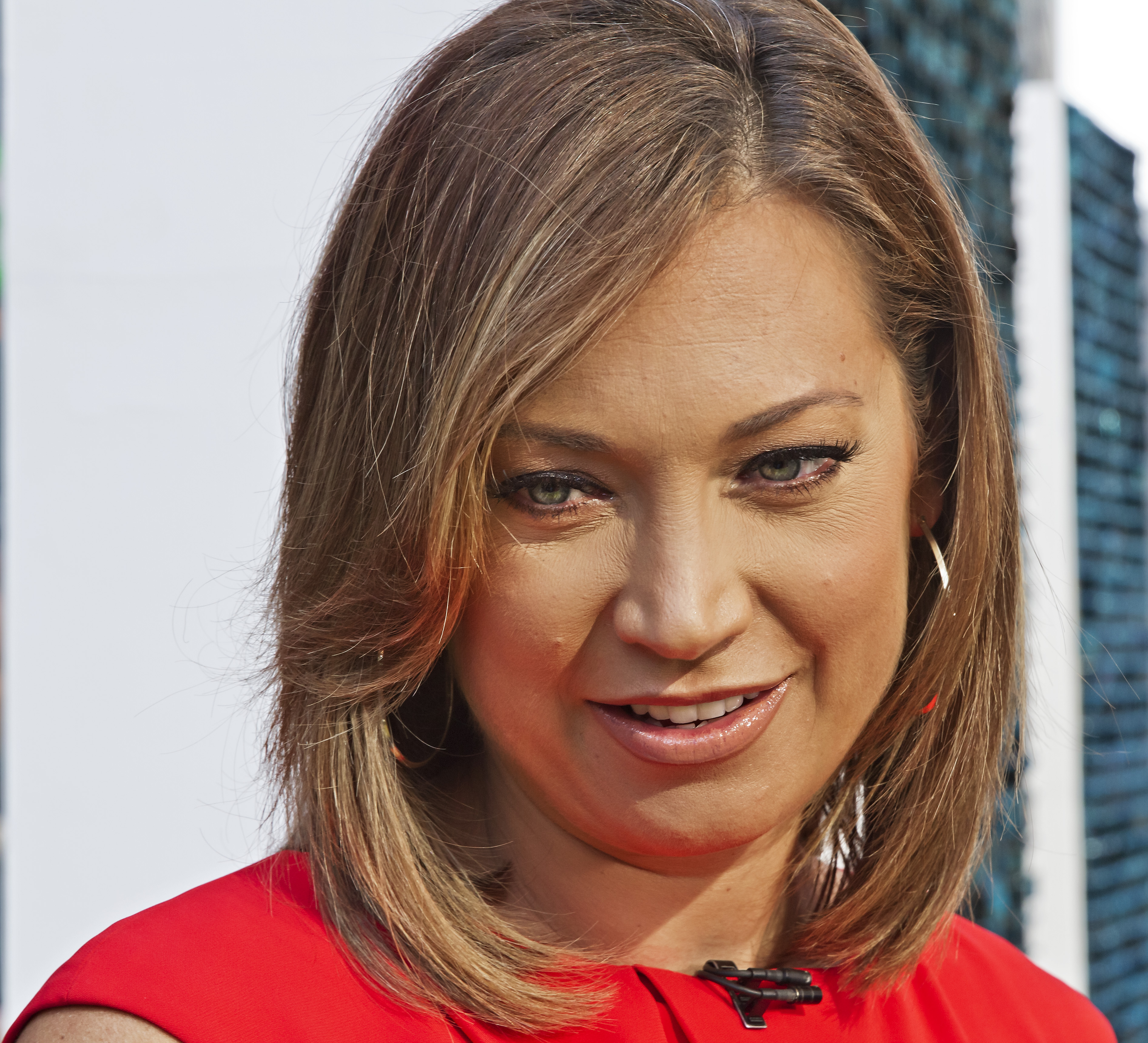
Ginger Zee
Co-Host/Chief Meteorologist; 2013–present

== Anchor/host chronology ==
				Years
David Hartman	Nancy Dussault			1975 – 1977
David Hartman	Sandy Hill			1977 – 1980
David Hartman	Joan Lunden			1980 – 1987
Charles Gibson	Joan Lunden			1987 – 1997
Charles Gibson	Lisa McRee			1997 – 1998
Kevin Newman	Lisa McRee			1998 - 1999
Charles Gibson	Diane Sawyer			1999 - 2005
Charles Gibson	Diane Sawyer	Robin Roberts		2005 - 2006
Robin Roberts	Diane Sawyer			2006 – 2009
Robin Roberts	George Stephanopoulos			2009 – 2014
Robin Roberts	George Stephanopoulos	Lara Spencer		2014 – 2016
Robin Roberts	George Stephanopoulos	Michael Strahan	Lara Spencer	2016–present

== Former anchors and hosts ==
=== Main hosts ===
- David Hartman (1975–1987)
- Nancy Dussault (1975–1977)
- Sandy Hill (1977–1980)
- Joan Lunden (1980–1997)
- Charles Gibson (1987–1998 & 1999–2006)
- Lisa McRee (1997–1999)
- Kevin Newman (1998–1999)
- Diane Sawyer (1999–2009)

=== News anchors ===
Name	Duration
Steve Bell	1975–1986
Kathleen Sullivan	1982–1987
Jed Duvall	1987–1988
Forrest Sawyer	1988–1989
Paula Zahn	1988–1990
Mike Schneider	1989–1993
Morton Dean	1993–1996
Elizabeth Vargas	1996–1997
Kevin Newman	1997–1998
Antonio Mora	1998–2002
Robin Roberts	2002–2005
Chris Cuomo	2006–2009
Juju Chang	2009–2011
Josh Elliott	2011–2014
Amy Robach	2014–2023

=== Weather anchors ===
Name	Duration
John Coleman	1975–1983
Dave Murray	1983–1986
Spencer Christian	1986–1998
Tony Perkins	1999–2005
Mike Barz	2005–2006
Sam Champion	2006–2013

=== Correspondents ===
- Joel Siegel: Entertainment Editor (1981–2007)
- Tony Reali (2014–2015 weekdays; 2015–2018 weekends)
- Tim Johnson (1975–2010)
- Stephen Colbert (1990s)

== International broadcasts ==
In Australia, the Nine Network broadcast Good Morning America on all its regional affiliates from 2016 to 2021. Nine Regional had begun broadcasting it before 2016. Since 2021, WIN Television, has broadcast it on a one-day delay every Tuesday through Friday from 3:30 to 5:00, Saturdays from 5:30 to 7:00, Sundays from 6:00 to 7:00 and Monday mornings from 4:00 to 5:00 a.m.

The Nine broadcasts featured a map providing forecasts for Australia in place of the national U.S. weather map. However, as of July 3, 2018, Nine no longer airs the show. Although it aired at the same time as Seven Network and Network 10's broadcasts of NBC's Today and CBS Mornings (including its predecessor, CBS This Morning), Good Morning America's broadcasts by Nine were unchallenged ratings-wise in some regions where other affiliates preempt their networks' American breakfast programs with paid and religious programming.

== Accolades ==
In 1993, Good Morning America won the Daytime Emmy Award for Outstanding Daytime Talk Series. In 21st GLAAD Media Awards, the program was nominated for a GLAAD Media Award for "Outstanding TV Journalism Segment" for the segment "Total Transformation: Why Chaz Bono Decided to Change". At the 32nd GLAAD Media Awards, the program was again nominated for the "Outstanding TV Journalism Segment" category for the segment "Dwyane Wade One-On-One: Basketball Legend Opens Up About Supporting Transgender Daughter".

== See also ==
- ABC News
- Breakfast television
- List of years in television
