= Mike Buresh =

American meteorologist

- Born: Michael Buresh; Iowa, United States
- Occupation: Broadcast Meteorologist
- Notable credit: Chief Meteorologist of Action News on WJAX-TV/WFOX-TV in Jacksonville, Florida
- Title: Chief Meteorologist

Michael Buresh is the Chief Meteorologist on Action News at WJAX-TV/WFOX-TV in Jacksonville, Florida. He broadcasts the weather on all evening newscasts (4, 6:30 and 10 p.m. on WFOX-TV and 5, 5:30, 6 and 11 on WJAX-TV and WFOX-TV).

Mike studied meteorology at the University of Oklahoma. He also chased storms and was employed by the National Weather Service while in college. He graduated from Iowa State University.

Shortly after graduating, Mike became a Certified Broadcast Meteorologist.

Mike has been employed by WHO-TV in Des Moines, Iowa and at WKRC-TV in Cincinnati, Ohio.
