= Mike Barz =

American broadcaster (born 1970)

Mike Barz (born Michael Barszcz; April 9, 1970) is an American broadcaster who was weekday morning news anchor at WFOX-TV and WJAX-TV in Jacksonville, Florida. He was a morning news anchor at WFLD, the Fox affiliate in Chicago, Illinois, from 2007 to 2009.

== Early life and education ==
Michael Barszcz was born in Los Angeles to a military family. He moved to the Midwest to attend Indiana University Bloomington, where he earned a bachelor's degree in 1993.

== Professional career ==
Early in his career, Barz adjusted his surname and began working as a news anchor at WHBF-TV in Rock Island, Illinois (1996–1997) and at WLUK-TV in Green Bay, Wisconsin, where he worked as a feature reporter and anchor. Barz left WLUK in 1998 to come to Chicago to take a job at WGN-TV as the sports anchor for the WGN Morning News, joining a morning news team with a controversially comedic bent.

In early May 2005, Barz received an early release from his contract at WGN-TV to become a full-time feature contributor at ABC News' Good Morning America (GMA). Barz anchored the GMA's weather segment after Tony Perkins' departure from the show in 2005 until September 5, 2006, when he was succeeded by Sam Champion.

In March 2007, Barz returned to Chicago as a co-anchor of WFLD-TV's "Fox News in the Morning," working alongside co-anchors Tamron Hall and David Novarro. Novarro subsequently was moved to a different WFLD newscast, and after Hall joined MSNBC in New York, Barz was joined by a new co-anchor, Jan Jeffcoat, in June 2007.

In July 2010, Barz was hired as a weekday morning news anchor at the Action News Jax stations, WAWS and WTEV-TV, in Jacksonville, Florida. His contract was not renewed in 2014 as part of a larger newsroom shakeup.

Barz was present at the 40th anniversary of Good Morning America on November 19, 2015.

In 2018, Mike Barz became WISH-TV’s evening news anchor for the 6pm, 10pm, and 11pm newscasts.

== Personal ==
Barz married former WFLD-TV reporter Tera Williams (a.k.a. Tera Barz), in 2010. She was his co-anchor at WFOX-TV, until June 2012. Barz and Williams divorced in October 2014.
