= Tom McGehee =

American businessman (1924–2002)

Thomas Rive McGehee, Sr. (12 July 1924 – 6 August 2002) was a Jacksonville, Florida, business and civic leader who served on the boards of over twenty entities and founded the charity, Dreams Come True.

== Early years ==
McGehee was born and raised in Jacksonville and served in the US Army during World War II. He was a corporal in the 8th Armored Division until his discharge in 1946, then attended Jacksonville University and the University of Alabama, graduating with a Bachelor of Science in chemistry. He married the former Delia Houser Crawford in 1950. and they had two children, Thomas R. Jr. (Mac), and Delia Houser, II (Dede).

== Business ==
Thomas's father, Clifford Graham McGehee, had founded the Jacksonville Paper Company in 1919, and after college, Thomas was dispatched to the company's mill in Louisiana to learn the paper manufacturing business. By 1956, he was president of the company, which was sold by the family in 1965. Tom and his brother Frank immediately started a new company, Mac Papers, to target the printing and graphics industries. The business was successful and expanded throughout 8 southeastern states. As of 2006, the firm recorded sales in excess of $500 million, employed 950 people and was one of the 50 largest private companies in the Greater Jacksonville Metropolitan Area.

== Television ==
Tom and Frank McGehee founded Christian Television of Jacksonville. The non-profit purchased Channel 47 before it was launched in August 1980 and requested the call letters, WXAO. "XAO" stood for "Christ, the alpha and the omega" in Greek. Their intent was to be an alternative to commercial television's sex and violence by broadcasting programs from The PTL Club, Christian Television Network, and Trinity Broadcast Network. The station was Jacksonville's first 24-hour station, but never generated a large viewership and was sold in 1990 for approximately $3 million.

== Community ==
McGehee was active in civic endeavors in Jacksonville, serving as president of United Way in 1964. He was a member of the board of Barnett Bank from 1961–1992 and served on the board of Jacksonville University from 1959 until the late 1990s, including a stint as chairman in 1992. McGehee volunteered to help neighborhood groups like Friends of Five Points as often as more visible organizations, such as the Chamber of Commerce.

In 1996, McGehee and his wife made a $1 million gift to the University of Florida veterinary school to build an Equine Reproduction Facility which was named in honor of their daughter Dede, a veterinarian and UF alumnae.

== Charitable foundation ==
Tom McGehee, along with J.J. Daniel, Robert Feagin, and Laurence Lee, Jr. started the Greater Jacksonville Area Community foundation in May 1964 as "a depository for the people of Jacksonville – both the large and small – the wealthy and the moderate, to be able to give for the betterment of their fellow man, not just today, but in a continuing way, through the principles of a foundation, for years to come", wrote McGehee. McGehee was so involved with the organization that many people thought that the Jacksonville Community Foundation was Tom McGehee's personal philanthropy, according to a consultant.

McGehee served as chairman for almost 20 years until he recruited his friend, Bob Shircliff, to become chairman and infuse new enthusiasm into the organization. Shircliff hired Andy Bell as executive director, but Shircliff and Tom McGehee supplemented Bell's salary for several years because the foundation couldn't afford what Bell was worth.

As of 2009, the Community Foundation in Jacksonville, as it is known today, is the oldest community foundation in Florida and counts more than 350 individual funds with over $125 million in assets. They have issued grants in excess of $140 million.

=== Grant a wish ===
In 1984, McGehee learned about George Lee, a 17-year-old from Jacksonville with cystic fibrosis. Lee's dream was to play with golfer Fred Couples, and McGehee and his wife, Delia, arranged to fulfill George's wish. Lee died less than a year later, and was buried with the driver given to him by Couples. McGehee presented the idea of a non-profit group that grants the wishes of children with life-threatening illnesses to several local business leaders who supported the concept, and Dreams Come True (DCT) was created. At the time, McGehee owned television station channel 47, and the charity began work in an empty office there, but grew. At the time of McGehee's death, it had granted the wishes of 1,275 children. According to Suzanne Crittenden, DCT Associate Director, "His promise to every child was that 'if you have a life-threatening illness, you will have a dream come true.' He left a big void, but he's charged us with quite a mission."

== Death ==
McGehee died in 2002 at the age of 78.
