= Mac Papers =

American paper products company

- Type: Private
- Industry: Paper and print, packaging, facilities supplies and office products
- Founded: 1965
- Headquarters: Jacksonville, Florida
- Key people: Sutton McGehee - CEO; David S. McGehee - President; Greg Gay - CFO; Mac McGehee - Executive VP
- Products: Printing papers, envelopes, wide format, packaging solutions, graphic supplies, facilities supplies and office products
- Revenue: ▲US$500 million
- Number of employees: 950

Mac Papers is an industrial distributor of paper and printing supplies, packaging materials and equipment, facility supplies, and office products headquartered in Jacksonville, Florida, United States. The company is the largest supplier of printing paper and envelopes in the Southeast United States, delivering 100,000 tons of paper each year. The company also provides graphic supplies, wide format media and equipment, packaging services, and office supplies, as well as custom product and logistics services.

== History ==
Clifford Graham McGehee founded the Jacksonville Paper Company in 1919. Frank McGehee and Tom McGehee, his sons, both worked in the family business, with Tom serving as president by 1956. The Jacksonville Paper Company was sold by the family in 1965, and the two brothers immediately started a new enterprise to target the printing and graphics industries. The brothers expanded the business throughout eight states in the southeast, establishing distribution centers and employing many family members. The company features products from the best paper manufacturers worldwide. Founder Tom McGehee died in 2002; brother Frank followed in 2006, but the company is still owned and operated by the McGehee family. Frank's son David is currently president and Sutton is CEO; Tom's son Mac is executive vice president. Five members of the third generation are currently working in the business.

When Mac Papers opened in 1965, its slogan was "paper is all we do." While the company remains committed to its paper business, Mac Papers has diversified its core business into four distinct segments: Paper & Print, Packaging, Facilities Supplies and Office Products.

On August 4, 2009, Mac Papers Envelope Converters, a subsidiary of Mac Papers, announced the acquisition of the envelope division of Cardinal Unjinx.

In 2015, the company launched a website to celebrate its 50th year in business.

== Community ==
The company donates 10% of pre-tax profits to charities and non-profit groups each year. Their employees and management also donate their time by serving as leaders of local organizations including churches, schools, the Chamber of Commerce, United Way and YMCA. The firm was named First Coast Company of the Year by the Jacksonville Business Journal in 1997. In 2003, Mac was again given the honor.
