= WFOX-TV =

Television station in Jacksonville, Florida

- Jacksonville, Florida; United States
- Channels: Digital: 14 (UHF); Virtual: 30
- Branding: Fox30; Action News Jax; Telemundo Jacksonville (30.4)

Programming
- Affiliations: 30.1: Fox; 30.2: MyNetworkTV/MeTV; 30.3: Heroes & Icons; 30.4: Telemundo

Ownership
- Owner: Cox Media Group; (Cox Television Jacksonville, LLC)
- Sister stations: WJAX-TV

History
- First air date: February 15, 1981
- Former call signs: WAWS-TV (February–October 1981); WAWS (October 1981–2014)
- Former channel numbers: Analog: 30 (UHF, 1981–2009); Digital: 32 (UHF, 2001–2020)
- Former affiliations: Independent (1981–1986); UPN (secondary, 2002–2006); MyNetworkTV (secondary, 2006–2007)
- Call sign meaning: Fox Broadcasting Company

Technical information
- Licensing authority: FCC
- Facility ID: 11909
- ERP: 663 kW
- HAAT: 289 m (948 ft)
- Transmitter coordinates: 30°16′51.9″N 81°34′12.2″W

Links
- Public license information: Public file; LMS
- Website: www.actionnewsjax.com

WFOX-TV (channel 30) is a television station in Jacksonville, Florida, United States, affiliated with Fox, MyNetworkTV, and Telemundo. It is owned by Cox Media Group alongside CBS affiliate WJAX-TV (channel 47). The two stations, whose combined news department is known as Action News Jax, share studios on Central Parkway and transmitter facilities on Hogan Road, both on Jacksonville's Southside.

Channel 30 began broadcasting as WAWS-TV on February 15, 1981. Constructed by a partnership of Crown Broadcasting and Malrite Communications, WAWS was the second new television station to start in Jacksonville within a year and the leading independent station in the market through the 1980s, remaining ahead of competition from channel 47 (first as WXAO-TV and later as WNFT). WAWS became Jacksonville's Fox affiliate when the network launched in 1986. Clear Channel Television acquired the station in 1989; under Clear Channel, the station began airing 10 p.m. local newscasts, first from WJKS-TV before starting its own news department in December 1996. It also began managing channel 47 under a local marketing agreement. That station was a UPN affiliate until it switched to CBS in 2002.

Clear Channel sold its stations to Newport Television in 2007; it could not own the channel 47 license but continued to operate the station under an agreement with a related company. The stations adopted the Action News brand for their newscasts in 2009. In 2012, Cox Media Group acquired WAWS. In 2014, WAWS and WTEV became WFOX-TV and WJAX-TV as part of a station overhaul; by 2023, Action News had moved into second place in the local TV news ratings.

== History ==
=== Early years ===
In 1977, interest began to increase in the unused channel 30 allocation to Jacksonville. Three groups applied for the channel: Malrite Communications; Crown Broadcasting, headed by Martin Stein, the founder of Jacksonville's Regency Square shopping center; and Springfield Television. As a result, Malrite shifted its application to channel 47, also sought by Christian Television of Jacksonville. Springfield withdrew its application in an agreement to buy 25 percent of Crown's stock, clearing the way for Crown to receive a construction permit on November 2, 1978. After a split between Crown and Springfield, the station was still unbuilt by 1980, when Malrite, which had withdrawn its channel 47 application in 1978, agreed to buy 51 percent of Crown's permit.

From studios on Hogan Road, channel 30 began broadcasting as WAWS-TV on February 15, 1981. It was an independent station whose programming consisted of movies, classic TV series, and children's programs, including a local version of TV Powww. Named for Ashley Wellhouse Stein, granddaughter of Martin Stein, it was the second new television station for Jacksonville in six months; channel 47 had debuted on August 1, 1980, as WXAO-TV. Even though channel 30 was the second of the two stations to come on air, it quickly drew a larger audience than WXAO-TV, which in its early years was a Christian-oriented station. A May 1981 ratings survey from the Nielsen Company measured total-day viewership for WXAO at 5,000 viewers and WAWS at 19,000. Malrite became the sole owner of WAWS in 1984, when it agreed to acquire Crown Broadcasting's 49-percent stake.

WAWS remained Jacksonville's leading independent station through the 1980s, in spite of increased competition from channel 47, which shed its Christian orientation and became a secular independent as WNFT in 1983. In 1986, WAWS joined the new Fox network at its launch.

Malrite put WAWS up for sale in early 1989 and negotiated with NewSouth Broadcasting, owners of WTSG-TV in Albany, Georgia, as to a possible purchase. After negotiations with NewSouth, which was speculated to have been disfavored by program syndicators, fell through, Clear Channel Television agreed to acquire the station for $8.1 million in a deal announced in late June. Clear Channel expanded its Jacksonville operations in 1995, when WNFT—by that time a UPN affiliate—was acquired by RDS Broadcasting. RDS signed a local marketing agreement for Clear Channel to manage most station operations with its own staff, with RDS employing a general manager and chief engineer. The WNFT programming lineup was changed to prevent it from competing with WAWS's higher-rated selections of children's programs and situation comedies. In March 1996, that station changed its call sign to WTEV-TV.

=== Entering the news business ===
Under Clear Channel, WAWS gained a news presence. The station contracted with Jacksonville's ABC affiliate, WJKS (channel 17), to produce a 10 p.m. local newscast. Fox 30 First Coast News at 10 debuted on October 7, 1991; it was the first full-length prime time newscast in the Jacksonville market and featured a dedicated producer, reporter, and videographer. WJKS was the third-rated news operation in Jacksonville at the time, and the newscast it produced for WAWS came to draw more viewers than WJKS's 11 p.m. news, twice as many by May 1996.

In 1996, WJKS lost its ABC affiliation to WBSG-TV (channel 21) in Brunswick, Georgia, beginning in 1997. WJKS's owner, Media General, gave up the fight to retain the network affiliation that August; at that time, channel 17's news employees were told the news operation would continue at least through December, because WJKS had to maintain a news department to meet its contractual obligations to WAWS. Employees began to depart WJKS, with the sports director and lead female anchor announcing their departures within two months of the news. WJKS-TV's final local newscast aired December 29, 1996. The end of the WJKS-TV news department spurred WAWS to launch its own to fill the void created by the end of Fox 30 First Coast News at 10. After talks with WJKS about renting its existing facilities broke down when Media General opted to retain the equipment for use in other cities, the WAWS news department debuted on December 30, 1996, with the launch of half-hour 10 and 11 p.m. newscasts. Most of the news staff, except for several WJKS-TV news employees, came from outside of the Jacksonville market.

With the consolidation of WTEV into WAWS and the launch of a local news operation and increased staffing for the latter, Clear Channel needed new studio space. The company purchased a building in the EastPark area of south Jacksonville and moved operations there in August 1997. The next month, the WAWS news department was extended to WTEV with the launch of UPN47 News at 6:30; at the same time, the 11 p.m. newscast was dropped to create an hour-long 10 p.m. newscast instead. Clear Channel acquired WTEV outright from MGA Broadcasting after the Federal Communications Commission (FCC) legalized duopolies—the outright ownership of two broadcast licenses in a market—in 1999.

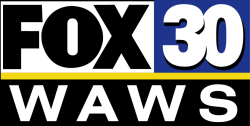
Former logo used from 2001 to April 12, 2009.

On July 15, 2002, WTEV-TV assumed the CBS affiliation for Jacksonville from WJXT (channel 4), which had been in a dispute with the network over compensation and opted not to continue with the network. On April 22, WTEV-TV announced it would become the new CBS affiliate on July 15. UPN programming moved from WTEV to a secondary affiliation on WAWS. The conversion to CBS brought with it an expansion of the news department. The morning newscast moved entirely to WTEV, while new newscasts were added for WTEV at 5:30, 6, and 11 p.m. on weeknights as well as weekend evenings. At the outset, newscasts on WTEV had a separate anchor team, but shared reporters, weather, and sports with WAWS; 17 employees were hired to support the expanded operation. A new dual-purpose news set was built with a skyline and newsroom backdrop for WTEV and a blue background for WAWS.

UPN and The WB announced in January 2006 that they would merge into a new network, The CW. The former WB affiliate, WJWB (the former WJKS), agreed to affiliate with The CW on March 28, and WAWS became a secondary affiliate of MyNetworkTV, a new network set up by Fox Television Stations to serve stations not chosen for The CW. WAWS placed MyNetworkTV programming on its second subchannel, known as the Variety Channel, when it launched in January 2007.

=== Newport Television ownership ===
Clear Channel announced the sale of its television station portfolio to Newport Television, controlled by Providence Equity Partners, for $1.2 billion (equivalent to $1.74 billion in 2025) on April 20, 2007. The sale was made so Clear Channel could refocus around its radio, outdoor advertising and live event units. The sale received FCC approval on December 1, 2007; after settlement of a lawsuit filed by Clear Channel owners Thomas H. Lee Partners and Bain Capital against Providence to force the deal's completion, consummation took place on March 14, 2008. When the FCC approved the transaction, it forced Newport to immediately divest itself of either WAWS or WTEV within six months of completing the purchase. Though their ownership had previously been permissible, now that they were both among the four highest-rated TV stations in the Jacksonville market, they could not be sold to the same buyer. The FCC at the time did not permit the common ownership of "top four" stations. WTEV-TV and five other stations which Newport could not own, in some cases because of Providence Equity Partners's stake in the Spanish-language network Univision, were sold to High Plains Broadcasting, owned by Jim Martin, though Newport continued to control station operations through agreements.

On April 13, 2009, the news operation of WAWS and WTEV was restructured to bring all newscasts under the common brand of Action News. Coinciding with the changes, news anchor assignments were reorganized so that one anchor team—Paige Kelton and Mark Spain—served as the main anchors of all weeknight Action News broadcasts across WAWS and WTEV. The use of a common news brand for two stations had precedent in Jacksonville, as WTLV and WJXX (channel 25) had shared newscasts known as First Coast News since 2000.

=== Cox Media Group ownership ===
In March 2012, Providence Equity Partners announced it was seeking a buyer for the Newport Television stations. Four months later, it announced the sale of most of the stations, with Cox Media Group acquiring WAWS and WTEV as well as Newport's stations in Tulsa. Unable to own the WTEV-TV license outright, Cox assigned it to Bayshore Television, owned by Bruce Baker, a former Cox Television president, but continued to program the station. (Note: In 2018, Bill Hoffman of Vero Beach, a retired president of Cox Media Group, acquired the channel 47 license for $12.17 million (equivalent to $14.9 million in 2025). The change in ownership did not affect station operations.)

Action News was aggressively overhauled in 2014 with the non-renewal of the contracts of five anchors, including Kelton, who stayed on in another capacity, and Mike Barz. Twenty positions were added, mostly in the newsroom; weekend early morning newscasts were launched; and the news product was reoriented around a faster pace. New main news anchors, John Bachman and Tenikka Smith-Hughes, were hired from other Cox stations in Atlanta and Charlotte. The relaunch also included changes in call sign for WAWS and WTEV. On August 26, 2014, Cox announced their intention to change WAWS's call sign to WFOX-TV, contingent on FCC approval, through a request made in July. In an email to The Florida Times-Union, general manager Jim Zerwekh stated that the change would better associate the station with the Fox network. Concurrently, sister station WTEV-TV was renamed WJAX-TV. The change took effect on September 7, 2014.

Shortly after the call sign changes, Action News introduced weekend morning newscasts on WFOX: a three-hour Saturday broadcast from 6 to 9 a.m., and a two-hour Sunday broadcast from 6 to 8 a.m. On January 11, 2016, WFOX began airing the 6 p.m. news already seen on WJAX and debuted an exclusive 6:30 p.m. newscast, airing while WJAX presents the CBS Evening News. In 2017, the Action News Jax stations became the official preseason broadcasters of Jacksonville Jaguars football.

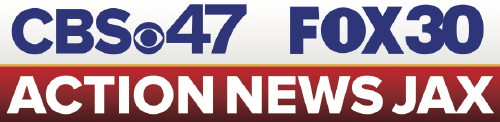
Action News Jax logo

Cox Media Group was acquired in 2019 by Apollo Global Management. In 2023, Action News edged out First Coast News at 11 p.m. in total households but not in viewers 25–54, with both newscasts behind WJXT, which has remained Jacksonville's news leader as an independent station.

On November 19, 2025, Cox filed to acquire WJAX from Hoffman Communications, creating a legal duopoly with WFOX. The sale was completed on April 7, 2026.

== Notable on-air staff ==
=== Current ===
- Mike Buresh – chief meteorologist, since 2002

=== Former ===
- Mike Barz – anchor, 2010–2014
- Juliet Huddy – reporter, to 1998

== Technical information and subchannels ==
WFOX-TV's transmitter facility is located on Hogan Road on Jacksonville's Southside. The station's signal is multiplexed:

Subchannels of WFOX-TV
Subchannel	Res.	Short name	Programming
30.1	720p	WFOXHD	Fox
30.2	480i	WFOXMY	MyNetworkTV & MeTV
30.3	480i	WFOXHI	Heroes & Icons
30.4	720p	WFOXTM	Telemundo

=== Analog-to-digital conversion ===
WAWS began providing a digital, high-definition signal on October 29, 2002, on channel 32. The station ceased analog programming on June 12, 2009, as part of the digital television transition. The digital signal remained on channel 32, using virtual channel 30. WFOX-TV relocated its signal from channel 32 to channel 14 on August 25, 2020, as a result of the 2016 United States wireless spectrum auction.
