= WGN Morning News =

American local morning TV news program

- Opening theme: "Chicago's Very Own" by 615 Music
- Country of origin: United States
- Original language: English

Production
- Executive producer: Aline Cox
- Production locations: WGN-TV Studios, 2501 W. Bradley Place, Chicago, Illinois
- Camera setup: Videotape; Multi-camera
- Running time: 720 minutes
- Production company: Nexstar Media Group

Original release
- Network: WGN-TV
- Release: September 6, 1994 – present

Related
- WGN Saturday Morning News (1992–1998); WGN Sunday Morning News (1992–1994); WGN Weekend Morning News (2011–present)

The WGN Morning News is an American morning television news program airing on WGN-TV (channel 9), a CW owned-and-operated television station and former national superstation in Chicago, Illinois owned by Nexstar Media Group. The program is broadcast each weekday from 4:00 to 10:00 a.m. Central Time; weekend editions (under the title WGN Weekend Morning News) are broadcast on Saturdays from 7:00 to 10:00 a.m. and Sundays from 7:00 to 9:00 a.m. Central Time.

The program is formatted as a newscast with a somewhat less serious tone than WGN-TV's other local news programs and is known for its fun and rambunctious nature, with the anchors and reporters often shown more relaxed on-air, often pulling on-air pranks and practical jokes. The 4:00–6:00 a.m. portion of the newscast is more staid in tone to some extent and is a more generalized news/weather/sports/traffic format, while the 6:00–10:00 a.m. portion incorporates feature segments, interviews and includes some humorous elements.

Following a previous attempt that ran from 1991 to 1998, WGN-TV expanded its morning newscasts to weekends in August 2014, originally maintaining a one-hour format (running from 6:00 to 7:00 a.m.), similar in structure to the station's midday and evening newscasts with a general news/weather/sports format, although utilizing a single-anchor format. The weekend editions were eventually expanded to three hours on Saturdays (from 7:00 to 10:00 a.m.) and two hours on Sundays (from 7:00 to 9:00 a.m.) on the weekend of September 10–11, 2016, and switching to a two-anchor format (with original anchor Sean Lewis and meteorologist Mike Hammernik being joined by longtime assignment reporter Tonya Francisco as co-anchor) in alignment with the station's other newscasts.

== History ==
Prior to the program's launch, WGN-TV had already carried morning newscasts; the station ran five-minute news briefs following its morning movie showcases on weekdays from the 1970s through the early 1990s. An attempt was made at a full-fledged morning newscast in May 1984, titled Chicago's First Report; replacing the agriculture-focused Top 'o' the Morning, First Report was canceled by December of that year due to low viewership. The station would later debut conventional hour-long newscasts (under the title Chicago's Weekend Morning News) on Saturdays and Sundays at 8:00 a.m. in January 1992, predating the premiere of the weekday WGN Morning News in an unusual occurrence of a television station carrying a local weekend morning newscast absent a companion Monday–Friday morning program. At the time the weekend morning broadcasts debuted, WGN-TV ran the long-running Chicago television staple The Bozo Show on weekday mornings.

By 1994, WGN station management decided to get out of the weekday children's television business and moved The Bozo Show to Sunday mornings, revamping it as The Bozo Super Sunday Show on September 11 of that year. In its place, the station decided to launch a new weekday morning newscast; the WGN Morning News made its debut on September 6, 1994 (debuting on a Tuesday as the station carried The Jerry Lewis MDA Labor Day Telethon the previous day in the timeslot) as an hour-long newscast from 7:00-8:00 a.m.; it was originally anchored by Dave Eckert and Sonja Gantt, alongside meteorologist Paul Huttner. Concurrent with the move of Bozo to Sundays, the Sunday morning newscast was cancelled.

Within a year-and-a-half of its debut, the WGN Morning News was gradually expanded in length: first to two hours (retaining its 7:00 a.m. start time) in January 1996, followed eight months later by an additional one-hour extension at 6:00 a.m. that August. That year, Larry Potash (who remains on the newscast to this day as anchor of the 6:00-10:00 a.m. block) replaced Eckert as co-anchor of the program. While the weekday morning newscast gained an audience, WGN-TV would eventually cancel its more conventional Saturday morning edition—its lone remaining weekend morning newscast—in December 1998, leaving only the flagship 9:00 p.m. newscast as WGN's only news program on weekends (outside of public affairs programs People to People, Adelante, Chicago and the since-discontinued Minority Business Report) for the next twelve years. In January 2001, the weekday newscast was expanded to 3½ hours, adding a half-hour at 5:30 a.m. and in January 2004, it was expanded to four hours starting at 5:00 a.m.

On August 16, 2010, WGN-TV added an additional half-hour to the newscast, which expanded to 4:30-9:00 a.m.; with the expansion into the 4:30 timeslot, WGN-TV became the third Chicago station to begin its morning newscast at that time, along with NBC-owned WMAQ-TV (which debuted the current incarnation of its 4:30 a.m. show in 2009, although it had an earlier newscast at that time as Barely Today in 2007), and ABC-owned WLS-TV (which debuted a newscast in that timeslot two weeks earlier). On October 2 of that year, WGN-TV re-entered into weekend morning news, with the launch of two one-hour newscasts on Saturday and Sunday mornings from 6:00 to 7:00 a.m. (the Saturday newscast airs in the early time slot for one hour due to The CW's morning animation block). The addition made WGN-TV the second Tribune-owned station to carry a weekend morning newscast (though the first chronologically due to its earlier weekend morning shows in the 1990s; Fox affiliate WXIN/Indianapolis debuted weekend morning newscasts in August 2010; Fox affiliate WTIC-TV/Hartford and fellow CW affiliate KTLA/Los Angeles would later join them in January and April 2011, respectively).

On July 11, 2011, the weekday edition of the WGN Morning News expanded once more with the addition of a half-hour at 4:00 a.m., bringing the program to a five-hour time length. This made it the first station in the Chicago market and the third Tribune station (after WPIX/New York City and WXIN) to have its weekday morning newscast start at 4:00 a.m. In March 2013, reports surfaced that WGN station management was considering expanding the weekday edition of the WGN Morning News to six hours – with an additional hour of the newscast being added from 9:00 to 10:00 a.m., once Live! with Kelly and Michael (which had aired locally on WGN-TV since September 2002) moved to WLS-TV in September. The news of this expansion was confirmed on June 20, 2013 through a report by media columnist and former Chicago Sun Times reporter Robert Feder on his Facebook page.

== National carriage ==
From 1996 to 2014, the WGN Morning News did not regularly air on WGN-TV's national superstation feed WGN America, reportedly because certain segments of the newscast were not allowed to air outside of Chicago due to syndication exclusivity rules on segments within the newscast. The only instance where the WGN Morning News was carried nationally on WGN's superstation feed during this period was on September 12, 2001 as part of special coverage of the September 11th terror attacks on New York City and Washington, D.C. All of WGN's news programming (including the SyndEx-restricted segments, but excluding the video portions of highlight footage during sports segments) is streamed over the station's website and through WGN's smartphone applications.

WGN America restored a simulcast of the WGN Morning News to its schedule on February 3, 2014, airing only the first two hours of the broadcast, which replaced paid programming that occupied the 5:00–7:00 a.m. ET timeslot on the superstation feed (the addition concurred with the removal of the simulcast of WGN's 9:00 p.m. newscast, which was replaced by syndicated programming in that timeslot four days prior). WGN America restricted carriage of the program on December 15, 2014 to certain markets, with paid programming as a substitution in most others as a result of its transition to a basic cable network; because of this, WGN-TV's newscasts are now available worldwide only through the station's website, www.wgntv.com, and on television outside of the Chicago market via Canadian cable and satellite providers that carry the WGN-TV Chicago broadcast signal (WGN-TV is authorized for carriage in Canada by the Canadian Radio-television and Telecommunications Commission).

== Segments ==
- The 6 @ 6 – a rundown of six top stories of the morning, airs daily at the top of the 6:00 a.m. hour
- The 9 @ 9 – a rundown of nine top stories of the morning, airs daily at the top of the 9:00 a.m. hour
- And Now For Something Completely Hoover (Mondays)
- Around Town – daily on-location feature reports on events around Chicagoland, reported by Ana Belaval
- Bozo's Flashback – retro clips from The Bozo Show and its iterations
- Courtesy Desk - Paul Konrad reads and responds to viewer text messages, emails, and questions, sometimes featuring other WGN team members
- Dean Cooks – former weekly food segment presented by Dean Richards; airs Wednesdays
- Dean’s Buzz (or The Buzz on days when Richards is absent) – former entertainment news segment presented by Dean Richards
- Friday Forecaster – segment featuring Chicago-area children helping present a weather segment (usually runs during the school year)
- I Want Your Text - Paul Konrad and Pat Tomasulo read and respond to viewer texts, airs around 9:55 a.m., with Mike Toomey as the main back-up host
- The List - daily segment where a member of the news team shares a fun, quirky, or surprising trivia list on a pop culture or news topic.
- Robin Cooks Retro - Robin Baumgarten prepares unusual or nostalgic mid-century and vintage recipes, with Paul Konrad as the taste tester.
- Trending with Marcus – segment hosted by Marcus LeShock, focusing on stories trending on social media
- Voicemail & Other Stuff – weekly viewer feedback segment
- Weather in a Minute – brief weather segment, usually shown at the end of each hour
- What We Did This Weekend - the anchors, Mike Toomey, and a designated WGN staffer share highlights from their weekends (Mondays)
- What’s Happening

== Notable on-air personalities ==
=== Current personalities ===
- Dan Ponce – WGN Early Morning News co-anchor (4:00–6:00 a.m.)
- Lauren Jiggetts - WGN Early Morning News co-anchor (4:00–6:00 a.m.)
- Morgan Kolkmeyer – WGN Early Morning News weather anchor (4:00–6:00 a.m.)
- Marcus Leshock – "Trending" reporter (4:00-10:00 a.m.)
- Larry Potash – WGN Morning News co-anchor (6:00–10:00 a.m.)
- Robin Baumgarten – WGN Morning News co-anchor (6:00–10:00 a.m.)
- Paul Konrad – WGN Morning News weather anchor (6:00–10:00 a.m.)
- Pat Tomasulo – WGN Morning Newa sports anchor/reporter (6:00–10:00 a.m.)
- Ana Belaval – "Around Town" reporter (7:00-10:00 a.m.)
- Brhett Vickery - Traffic Reporter (4:00-9:00 a.m.)
- Mike Toomey -announcer for the show (9:00-10:00 a.m.)

The 4:00–6:00 a.m. anchor staff are humorously referred to in-show as "The B Team".
The 6:00-10:00a.m. anchor staff are humorously referred to in-show as "The A Team".

=== Former personalities ===
- Mike Barz – sports anchor (now at WISH-TV in Indianapolis)
- Sonja Gantt - co-anchor (later at WCNC-TV in Charlotte, now retired)
- Paul Huttner - meteorologist (now chief meteorologist at Minnesota Public Radio)
- Sarah Jindra – traffic anchor (now co-host of Spotlight Chicago)
- Randy Salerno – reporter/substitute anchor (later at WBBM-TV in Chicago, died in 2008)
- Dean Richards - entertainment reporter/film critic
- Roseanne Tellez – co-anchor (later at WBBM-TV; now co-anchor at WFLD)
- Valerie Warner – early morning co-anchor/reporter (now host of WLS-TV's "Windy City Live")
- Bill Weir – sports anchor (now at CNN)

== See also ==
- KTLA Morning News - a morning news and entertainment program on sister station KTLA in Los Angeles.
