= Tony Perkins (news anchor) =

American broadcast journalist

- Born: Anthony Perkins; August 25, 1959 (age 67); New York City, NY, United States
- Education: American University (B.A.)
- Occupations: Journalist, Radio personality
- Years active: 1983-present
- Television: WRC-TV anchor (2023–Present); WUSA; Get Up DC! anchor (2020–2023); WTTG; Anchor (2012–2019) (1998–1999); Weekday morning meteorologist (2005–2012) (1993–1998); ABC News; Good Morning America weekday meteorologist (1999–2005); WDCA; Host/producer (1986–1988)
- Spouse: Rhonda Perkins
- Children: 1
- Parent: Constance Bellamy (mother) Tommy Perkins (father)
- Relatives: Scott Perkins (brother)
- Awards: Emmy Awards (2)

Anthony Perkins (born August 25, 1959) is an American broadcast journalist, radio personality, and former weathercaster, best known for his work on ABC's Good Morning America as the primary weather anchor from 1999 to 2005. Perkins joined CBS affiliate WUSA in Washington, D.C., for six weeks, beginning October 21, 2019, for the station's morning show, Get Up DC!, which became a full-time assignment when he was named full-time anchor of the show in January 2020.

== Early life and education ==
Perkins was born on August 25, 1959, in New York City to Constance Bellamy (1938-2018) and Tommy Perkins (d. 1992). His parents had met when his father was working at a shoe store in New York. Together, the family lived in the South Bronx until moving to Washington, D.C., when he was five years old. His parents divorced when he was 11, and his mother worked as a telephone operator and night clerk to raise the family. He attended elementary school in Washington, D.C., junior high in Maryland and Virginia, and graduated from Mount Vernon High School in Alexandria, Virginia, in 1977. In high school, Perkins had a good academic record and was involved in many extracurricular activities, including becoming the first black editor-in-chief of his school's student newspaper.

He received his Bachelor of Arts degree from American University's School of Communication in 1981. There, he worked with the campus radio station and the black student newspaper, and helped found the campus television station.

Perkins comes from a line of family members involved in the radio business, including his father, who had worked at WOL and WOOK, and his uncle, who worked at WFIL as a radio engineer.

Perkins has a younger brother, Scott, who worked as an art director for CNN.

== Career ==
Before becoming a journalist, Perkins was a professional stand-up comedian from 1983 to 1993, appearing at clubs and colleges across the country, which helped him meet and come to work for Donnie Simpson as an off-air producer. He had also been working in radio for Cathy Hughes at WOL.

Throughout his career, Perkins has continued to support his alma mater and is an active member of the American University School of Communication's Dean Council.

=== Television ===
Perkins began his broadcast career as a desk assistant for the ABC News Washington, D.C., bureau in the early 1980s. From 1986 to 1988, he hosted and produced DC20 Breakaway for WDCA. From 1993 to 1998, he served as a weather forecaster at Fox station WTTG in Washington, D.C., and co-anchored the station's Fox Morning News from 1998 to 1999.

After six years at WTTG, Perkins joined ABC's Good Morning America on March 8, 1999 as the program's weekday morning weather forecaster and features reporter, where his catchphrase to turn it over to the local weather was "the weather in your neighborhood." He succeeded his longtime friend Spencer Christian on Good Morning America, who had moved to San Francisco to become a weather anchor for KGO-TV in 1999. During Perkins's time together with Robin Roberts, Diane Sawyer, and Charles Gibson, they were able to help Good Morning America bounce back in its television ratings against its morning show competitors after it experienced a slump in the mid-to-late-1990s. Perkins also co-hosted "Stealing Scenes," an entertainment-focused show for ABC News Now. In 2004, Perkins made a cameo on the ABC sitcom, Less than Perfect. That same year, he was also invited onto Jimmy Kimmel Live! as a guest.

On December 2, 2005, Perkins left Good Morning America to return to WTTG and was succeeded by Mike Barz. During his second stint on WTTG, Perkins continued as morning weather anchor and gradually transitioned to become the main anchor for the weekday morning newscast alongside Allison Seymour in July 2012. He was later transferred to the evening 5:00PM newscast with Laura Evans and 10:00 pm newscast with Shawn Yancy on October 28, 2013.

On January 19, 2019, Perkins departed WTTG to spend more time on his radio commitments.

On October 21, 2019, he joined CBS affiliate WUSA in Washington, D.C. for six weeks to be a part of the station's Get Up DC! morning show, together with Reese Waters and Annie Yu.

On January 7, 2020, just under a year after he left WTTG, it was announced that Perkins was returning to WUSA to anchor Get Up DC! full-time. The assignment allows him to continue hosting his radio show on WMMJ in the afternoons.

On March 3, 2023, it was announced that Perkins was joining WRC in Washington, D.C., to co-anchor News4 Today, the station's morning news program. Pat Lawson Muse, a member of WRC for over 40 years and co-anchor of the evening newscast, retired March 24, 2023. Eun Yang, News4 Today co-anchor, filled the vacancy left by Lawson Muse. Perkins filled the open chair on the morning news program left by Yang.

=== Radio ===
From 1985 to 1992, while working as a comic, Perkins also served as a writer, producer, and on-air contributor to The Donnie Simpson Show on WKYS-FM. He later co-hosted The Morning Crew on WKYS-FM from 1992 to 1993.

Perkins was an occasional in-studio guest on the Don and Mike Show, and its successor, the Mike O'Meara Show. From 2014 to 2018, he also hosted his own weekly comedy and entertainment podcast with co-host Gary Stein, the Tony Perkins Show featuring Gary Stein.

On December 18, 2017, Perkins announced that he would be returning to WMMJ-FM 102.3 Majic with Donnie Simpson as the afternoon drive host for a reboot of The Donnie Simpson Show on weekdays from 3:00 pm to 7:00 pm. To accommodate the schedule, he moved his anchoring schedule on WTTG from weeknight evenings to Friday and Saturday morning shows.

=== Awards and accomplishments ===
Perkins earned an Emmy Awards in 1988 for his work on DC20 Breakaway. He has also earned an additional Emmy Award.

== Personal life ==
Perkins is married to Rhonda Perkins, who worked as a social services administrator, and has a son named Connor (b. September 2003).
