= WJAX-TV =

Television station in Jacksonville, Florida

- Jacksonville, Florida; United States
- Channels: Digital: 19 (UHF); Virtual: 47
- Branding: CBS 47; CBS 47 Action News Jax

Programming
- Affiliations: 47.1: CBS; for others, see § Technical information and subchannels

Ownership
- Owner: Cox Media Group; (Cox Television Jacksonville, LLC)
- Sister stations: WFOX-TV

History
- First air date: August 1, 1980
- Former call signs: WXAO-TV (1980–1983); WNFT (1983–1996); WTEV-TV (1996–2014)
- Former channel numbers: Analog: 47 (UHF, 1980–2009)
- Former affiliations: Independent (1980–1995); UPN (1995–2002)
- Call sign meaning: "Jax", a shorthand for Jacksonville

Technical information
- Licensing authority: FCC
- Facility ID: 35576
- ERP: 1,000 kW
- HAAT: 291 m (955 ft)
- Transmitter coordinates: 30°16′51.9″N 81°34′12.2″W

Links
- Public license information: Public file; LMS
- Website: www.actionnewsjax.com

WJAX-TV (channel 47) is a television station in Jacksonville, Florida, United States, affiliated with CBS. It is owned by Cox Media Group alongside Fox affiliate WFOX-TV (channel 30). The two stations, whose combined news department is known as Action News Jax, share studios on Central Parkway and transmitter facilities on Hogan Road, both on Jacksonville's Southside.

Channel 47 went on the air on August 1, 1980, as WXAO-TV, the first new television station in the city since 1966. It was originally a Christian-oriented independent station with a mix of religious and family-friendly secular programs. Channel 30 launched as WAWS-TV six months later and remained the higher-rated independent in the Jacksonville market. Beginning in 1982, the station actively shed its religious image and programming, culminating in a call sign change to WNFT in 1983. Despite improvements in programming and facilities, WNFT remained behind WAWS in the ratings. In 1990, Krypton Broadcasting acquired WNFT. The station lost money every year under the firm's ownership, which culminated in a bankruptcy filing in 1993 and the station's operation under a court-appointed receiver. RDS Broadcasting won the bankruptcy auction for WNFT, which in 1995 affiliated with UPN and entered into a local marketing agreement with WAWS and its then-owner, Clear Channel Television. The call sign was changed to WTEV-TV in March 1996. The stations moved into their present studios, and WAWS's news department was extended to WTEV with the launch of 6:30 p.m. and 11 a.m. newscasts. Clear Channel acquired WTEV-TV outright in 1999 after the Federal Communications Commission (FCC) permitted duopoly ownership of TV stations.

In 2002, CBS and its longtime Jacksonville affiliate, WJXT (channel 4), ended their relationship after 53 years. WTEV-TV became the new Jacksonville CBS affiliate on July 15 of that year; the news department was expanded to produce additional daily newscasts for channel 47. Ratings for CBS network programming were generally unchanged as a result of the switch. Clear Channel sold its stations to Newport Television in 2007; because WTEV's ratings increase as a CBS affiliate made it one of the four highest-rated stations in the market, Newport was forced to divest the channel 47 license and operate the station under agreement. The stations adopted the Action News brand for their newscasts in 2009. In 2012, Cox Media Group acquired channel 30; from then until 2026, the channel 47 license was owned by former executives of Cox. In 2014, WAWS and WTEV became WFOX-TV and WJAX-TV as part of a station overhaul; by 2023, Action News had moved into second place in the local TV news ratings.

== As an independent station and UPN affiliate ==
=== WXAO: Christian TV for Jacksonville ===
In February 1978, Christian Television of Jacksonville, a non-profit corporation, announced it would apply to the Federal Communications Commission (FCC) to build a non-commercial television station on channel 47 in Jacksonville. The group of local businessmen was headed by Tom McGehee and the second to apply for the channel, after Malrite Communications; Malrite had filed for channel 47 when two other groups joined it in filing for channel 30.

Malrite withdrew in a settlement agreement reached in 1978, and Christian Television of Jacksonville was awarded the construction permit on June 22, 1979. However, facing financial difficulties as well as lower-than-expected contributions from potential viewers, it sold the permit to American Standard Leasing Corporation, a firm owned by Tom McGehee and his brother Frank. The new ownership meant the station would be operated on a commercial instead of noncommercial basis.

WXAO began broadcasting on August 1, 1980, as the first new television station in Jacksonville since WJKS (channel 17) began in 1966. The station's call sign, WXAO, represented "Christ, the Alpha and the Omega". WXAO aired religious programming as well as family-friendly secular series. Its manager, George Ivey, came from the Christian Broadcasting Network–owned WANX in Atlanta. Within months, Jacksonville went from having no independent stations to having two, as channel 30—a majority share in the permit having been acquired by Malrite—began broadcasting on February 15, 1981, as WAWS. That station quickly attracted a larger audience from sign-on to sign-off; a May 1981 ratings survey from the Nielsen Company measured total-day viewership for WXAO at 5,000 viewers and WAWS at 19,000.

=== WNFT: Second-rated independent ===
Jim Kontoleon, a former general manager of WTLV (channel 12), joined the staff as a consultant at the start of 1982 before becoming general manager. Under Kontoleon, management consciously began uncoupling channel 47 from its religious image and programming. Christian Television of Jacksonville, which had continued to exist as a producer of religious programming for WXAO, shut down that May. The station briefly aired an 11 p.m. newscast from April 1982 to January 1983 but it suffered from low ratings. In February 1983, most of the prime time religious programming was removed from the station's lineup, with The 700 Club moving to the 10 p.m. hour. The station added more children's programming, including the syndicated TV Powww, which moved from WAWS. On August 8, it adopted a new call sign, WNFT (for North Florida Television). Kontoleon, who was known on-air for frequent editorials and a string of promotional gimmicks, departed WNFT in late 1983 to run WTWS in New London, Connecticut.

With Kontoleon out, the McGehees invested in new programming and a signal upgrade; the station's antenna had been damaged in May 1982, affecting its signal, but this was not known for more than a year. The relaunch gave WAWS stiffer competition. However, the gap between the two stations widened again after WAWS became the Jacksonville affiliate of the startup Fox network. In 1988, the station increased its effective radiated power to 5 million watts. In spite of the increase, WNFT continued to struggle to shed the image it had earned in its early years as a "small-time" Christian station, and WAWS continued to lead WNFT in sign-on-to-sign-off ratings.

=== Krypton Broadcasting ownership and receivership ===
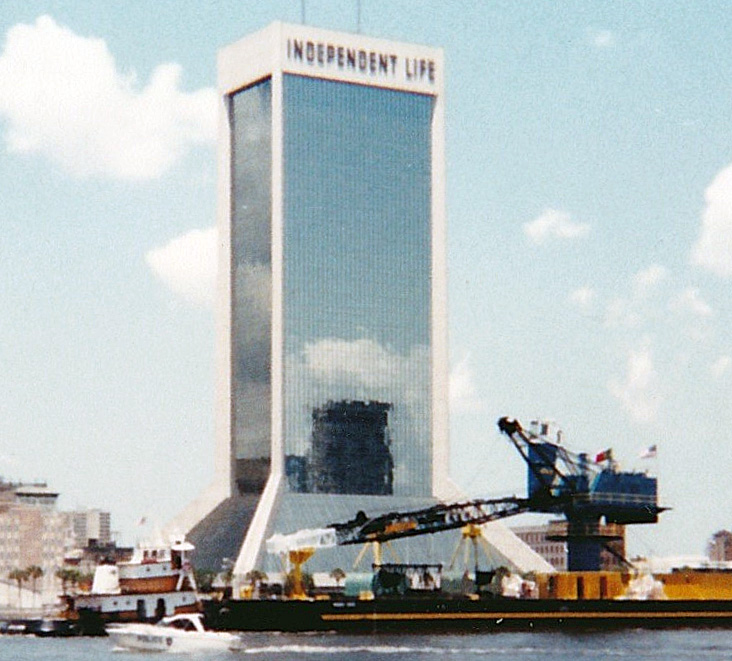
From 1990 to 1997, WNFT/WTEV-TV had studios in Jacksonville's Independent Life Building.

On March 30, 1990, McGehee announced that he had agreed to sell WNFT to Krypton Broadcasting of Jacksonville, a subsidiary of Krypton International Corporation of Palm Beach. McGehee cited his age at the time; in a 2002 interview, his son Thomas McGehee Jr. noted that the family was glad to have returned to its primary industry: paper. The sale price of $3 million (equivalent to $6.35 million in 2025) was seen as a bargain by Feltner and other local broadcasters; WAWS had been sold the year before for $8.1 million. Krypton, which also owned a library of motion pictures and the Palm Beach Stingrays of the United States Basketball League, was owned by Elvin Feltner and named for the community in Kentucky where he was born. Feltner intended for WNFT to be the first of up to 12 Krypton-owned stations. Seeking higher visibility, Feltner moved WNFT from its original studios on University Boulevard to facilities on the mezzanine level of downtown Jacksonville's Independent Life Building. The move more than doubled the station's rent and equipment costs.

Krypton, which later bought WTVX in Fort Pierce, serving West Palm Beach, and WABM in Birmingham, Alabama, soon found itself in financial trouble. In 1991, WNFT's losses widened over the previous year. In January 1992, Krypton missed a payment on a $19 million loan it had received two years prior from Dutch bank Internationale Nederlanden Bank N.V., and in June, the bank sued, seeking its money. While Krypton was attempting to buy a fourth station, WQTV in Boston in 1993, several program suppliers asked a federal court to order WNFT and WTVX into bankruptcy. By August 1993, 26 cases had been filed against Feltner for debts owed, ranging from the 1990 loan to $1,300 in condominium association fees. WTVX owed $3.3 million to program distributors, including Columbia Pictures, MCA Television, Warner Bros., Paramount Television, and 20th Century Fox, while former WTVX employees recalled that tapes of programs they no longer had rights to air were being shipped from Jacksonville to Fort Pierce to air on that station before the companies obtained an injunction against such activity. In August, the Alabama station joined its Florida sisters in bankruptcy.

In a court-ordered settlement in October 1993, Feltner relinquished all day-to-day control of WTVX and WNFT. A December report from a federal examiner, Soneet Kapila, suggested turning over their operations to a trustee. Kapila noted that Feltner had spurned an offer from Paxson Communications Corporation, which at the time was pursuing an entrance into television, for all three stations. He found that the Krypton stations needed an infusion of new capital and that they could not be sold if Feltner was still involved.

Even though Feltner was able to settle the suit filed by Internationale Nederlanden Bank in March 1994, and Feltner sued the syndicators alleging a conspiracy to hurt his stations, it was not enough. Columbia Pictures won an $8.8 million claim in the WTVX–WNFT case in July, when a federal judge found the stations had committed willful copyright infringement (in 1995, MCA won a $9 million judgment upheld in 1997), and in September, the stations were ordered to auction in October.

RDS Broadcasting submitted the highest bid at $10 million and was approved by the bankruptcy judge in October 1994. While the sale was pending, WNFT affiliated with UPN, a new national TV network that launched in January 1995. After ten months, the FCC approved RDS's purchase of WNFT in August 1995.

=== WTEV-TV: UPN affiliation and common operation with WAWS ===
From the outset, RDS Broadcasting intended to reach a joint sales agreement with Clear Channel Television, owner of WAWS, to market the two stations jointly. RDS's other station, KTFO in Tulsa, Oklahoma, was similarly operated in tandem with a Clear Channel station there. Under the agreement, Clear Channel assumed programming and most operational duties of the station, while RDS employed a general manager and chief engineer dedicated to WNFT; 14 employees of channel 47 were fired. The WNFT programming lineup was changed to prevent it from competing with WAWS's higher-rated selections of children's programs and situation comedies. The call sign was changed to WTEV-TV on March 4, 1996; the new designation, which sounded like "TV" when said out loud, was intended to symbolize a fresh start and emerged from a contest among station employees.

With the consolidation of WTEV into WAWS and the launch of a local news operation and increased staffing for the latter, Clear Channel needed new studio space. The company purchased a building in the EastPark area of south Jacksonville and moved operations there in August 1997. The next month, the WAWS news department was extended to WTEV with the launch of UPN47 News at 6:30, inspired by the success of a similar program at WNUV in Baltimore.

MGA Broadcasting, a company owned by Van H. Archer III, acquired WTEV and KTFO from RDS for $825,000. In 1999, the FCC legalized duopolies—the outright ownership of two broadcast licenses in a market—and Clear Channel acquired WTEV from MGA. In 2000, Clear Channel named Susan Adams Loyd as general manager and began to target WTEV toward Jacksonville's African American community, which it believed to be underserved. Clear Channel expanded the EastPark facility between 2000 and 2001 to house its radio stations and its outdoor advertising operation. An 11 a.m. newscast had been added to WTEV's lineup by 2002, and by the 2001–2002 TV season, WTEV was the seventh-highest-rated UPN affiliate in the country. It attracted a large audience among viewers aged 25–54, older than the target UPN audience and unusual for an affiliate of the network.

== Becoming a CBS affiliate ==
Jacksonville's historic CBS affiliate, WJXT (channel 4), was one of its strongest affiliates and the market leader. However, Post-Newsweek Stations and the network entered into a dispute in 2001 over compensation. WJXT renewed its affiliation agreement for one year and increased its purchases of syndicated programming, which observers, including managers at competing stations, interpreted as preparations for a possible change to independent status. Clear Channel Jacksonville president Josh McGraw told The Florida Times-Union, "I would be very surprised if it ever came to be. But you never know." It came to be on April 3, 2002, when WJXT announced it would no longer be Jacksonville's CBS affiliate. On April 22, WTEV-TV announced it would become the new CBS affiliate on July 15. UPN programming moved to a secondary affiliation on WAWS.

The conversion to CBS brought with it a full schedule of newscasts, airing at 5:30 a.m. (previously seen on WAWS), noon, and 5:30, 6, and 11 p.m. on weeknights as well as weekend evenings. At the outset, newscasts on WTEV had a separate anchor team but shared reporters, weather, and sports with WAWS; 17 employees were hired to support the expanded operation. A new dual-purpose news set was built with a skyline and newsroom backdrop for WTEV and a blue background for WAWS. Unlike in prior affiliation switches, after the switch, ratings for CBS programs remained unchanged. WTEV's revenues nearly doubled in 2003 after converting from UPN to CBS, rising to second behind WTLV. Ratings for WTEV's 6 and 11 p.m. newscasts landed in third place with audience shares of 9% at 6 p.m. and 11% at 11 p.m. In 2007, the station debuted a 5 p.m. newscast.

As a CBS affiliate, WTEV became the primary broadcaster of Jacksonville Jaguars football games. The team's local preseason coverage initially remained with WJXT after the switch, but an out clause in the agreement between WJXT and the Jaguars allowed the team to opt out of the agreement if that station were to lose its affiliation. As a result, the Jaguars moved their preseason games and other programming to WTEV in 2003.

Clear Channel announced the sale of its television station portfolio to Newport Television, controlled by Providence Equity Partners, for $1.2 billion (equivalent to $1.74 billion in 2025) on April 20, 2007. The sale was made so that Clear Channel could refocus around its radio, outdoor advertising and live event units. The sale received FCC approval on December 1, 2007; after settlement of a lawsuit filed by Clear Channel owners Thomas H. Lee Partners and Bain Capital against Providence to force the deal's completion, consummation took place on March 14, 2008. When the FCC approved the transaction, it forced Newport to immediately divest itself of one of WAWS or WTEV within six months of completing the purchase. Though their ownership had previously been permissible, now they were both among the four highest-rated TV stations in the Jacksonville market and could not be sold to the same buyer. The FCC at the time did not permit the common ownership of "top four" stations. WTEV-TV and five other stations which Newport could not own, in some cases because of Providence Equity Partners's stake in the Spanish-language network Univision, were sold to High Plains Broadcasting, owned by Jim Martin, though Newport continued to control station operations through agreements.

On April 13, 2009, the news operation of WAWS and WTEV was restructured to bring all newscasts under the common brand of Action News. Coinciding with the changes, news anchor assignments were reorganized so that one anchor team—Paige Kelton and Mark Spain—served as the main anchors of all weeknight Action News broadcasts across WAWS and WTEV. The use of a common news brand for two stations had precedent in Jacksonville, as WTLV and WJXX (channel 25) had shared newscasts known as First Coast News since 2000. By 2012, WTEV had the number-one 11 p.m. local newscast in the market.

=== Cox Media Group operation ===
In March 2012, Providence Equity Partners announced it was seeking a buyer for the Newport Television stations. Four months later, it announced the sale of most of the stations, with Cox Media Group acquiring WAWS and WTEV as well as Newport's stations in Tulsa. Unable to own the WTEV-TV license outright, Cox assigned it to Bayshore Television, owned by Bruce Baker, a former Cox Television president, but continued to program the station.

The WJAX-TV Action News logo

Action News was aggressively overhauled in 2014 with the non-renewal of the contracts of five anchors, including Kelton, who stayed on in another capacity, and Mike Barz. Twenty positions were added, mostly in the newsroom; weekend early morning newscasts were launched; and the news product was reoriented around a faster pace. New main news anchors, John Bachman and Tenikka Smith-Hughes, were hired from other Cox stations in Atlanta and Charlotte. The relaunch also included changes in call sign for WAWS and WTEV. On August 26, 2014, Cox announced their intention to change WTEV's call sign to WJAX-TV, contingent on FCC approval, through a request made in July. In an email to The Florida Times-Union, general manager Jim Zerwekh stated that the change would better associate the station with Jacksonville. The WJAX call sign had previously been used in Jacksonville on 1220 AM, owned by Jones College. Concurrently with the change to WJAX-TV, sister station WAWS was renamed WFOX-TV. The change took effect on September 7, 2014.

WTEV lost the Jaguars preseason rights to WJXT in 2014 but regained them in 2017 as part of a package involving both Action News Jax stations. In 2018, Bayshore sold the WJAX-TV license to Bill Hoffman of Vero Beach, a retired president of Cox Media Group, for $12.17 million (equivalent to $14.9 million in 2025). The change in ownership did not affect station operations. Cox Media Group was acquired in 2019 by Apollo Global Management. In 2023, Action News edged out First Coast News at 11 p.m. in total households, but not in viewers 25–54, with both newscasts behind WJXT, which has remained Jacksonville's news leader as an independent station.

The 2025 federal appeals court decision Zimmer Radio of Mid-Missouri v. FCC struck down limitations on one company owning two of the top four stations in a market. This removed the legal impediment for Cox to own the WFOX-TV and WJAX-TV licenses. Cox filed on November 19, 2025, to buy WJAX-TV outright from Hoffman and completed the transaction on April 7, 2026.

== Notable on-air staff ==
=== Current ===
- Mike Buresh – chief meteorologist, since 2002

=== Former ===
- Mike Barz – anchor, 2010–2014

== Technical information and subchannels ==
WJAX-TV's transmitter facility is located on Hogan Road on Jacksonville's Southside. The station's signal is multiplexed:

Subchannels of WJAX-TV
Subchannel	Res.	Short name	Programming
47.1	1080i	WJAXHD	CBS
47.2	480i	WJAXTN	Action Sports Jax TV
47.3	480i	WJAXCC	Catchy Comedy
47.4	480i	WJAXCZ	Cozi TV

=== Analog-to-digital conversion ===
WTEV-TV began providing a digital, high-definition signal on October 29, 2002, on channel 19. The station ceased analog programming on June 12, 2009, as part of the digital television transition. The digital signal remained on channel 19, using virtual channel 47.
