= 46th Daytime Emmy Awards =

- Awarded for: Outstanding achievement in daytime television
- Date: May 5, 2019
- Location: Pasadena Civic Auditorium; Pasadena, California, U.S.
- Country: United States
- Presented by: NATAS; ATAS
- Hosted by: Mario Lopez; Sheryl Underwood

Highlights
- Outstanding Drama Series: The Young and the Restless
- Outstanding Game Show: Family Feud
- Website: theemmys.tv/daytime

The 46th Daytime Emmy Awards, presented by the National Academy of Television Arts and Sciences (NATAS), honored the best in U.S. daytime television programming in 2018. The ceremony was held on May 5, 2019, at the Pasadena Civic Auditorium in Pasadena, California. Actors and television hosts Mario Lopez and Sheryl Underwood hosted the ceremony for the third consecutive time.

The drama pre-nominees were announced on January 24, 2019, and the standard nominations were announced on March 20, 2019.

== Rule changes ==
Changes were made to the Daytime Emmys rules and procedures to avoid a repeat of the previous year when the NATAS had to rescind the awarding of the Outstanding Guest Performer in a Digital Daytime Drama Series Emmy to Patrika Darbo, after it was determined that she appeared in a prior season of The Bay and entered scenes from multiple episodes for judging, both violations of the submission guidelines. The four network daytime dramas (The Bold and the Beautiful, Days of Our Lives, General Hospital, and The Young and the Restless) had threatened a boycott if no changes to the rules were made.

== Winners and nominees ==
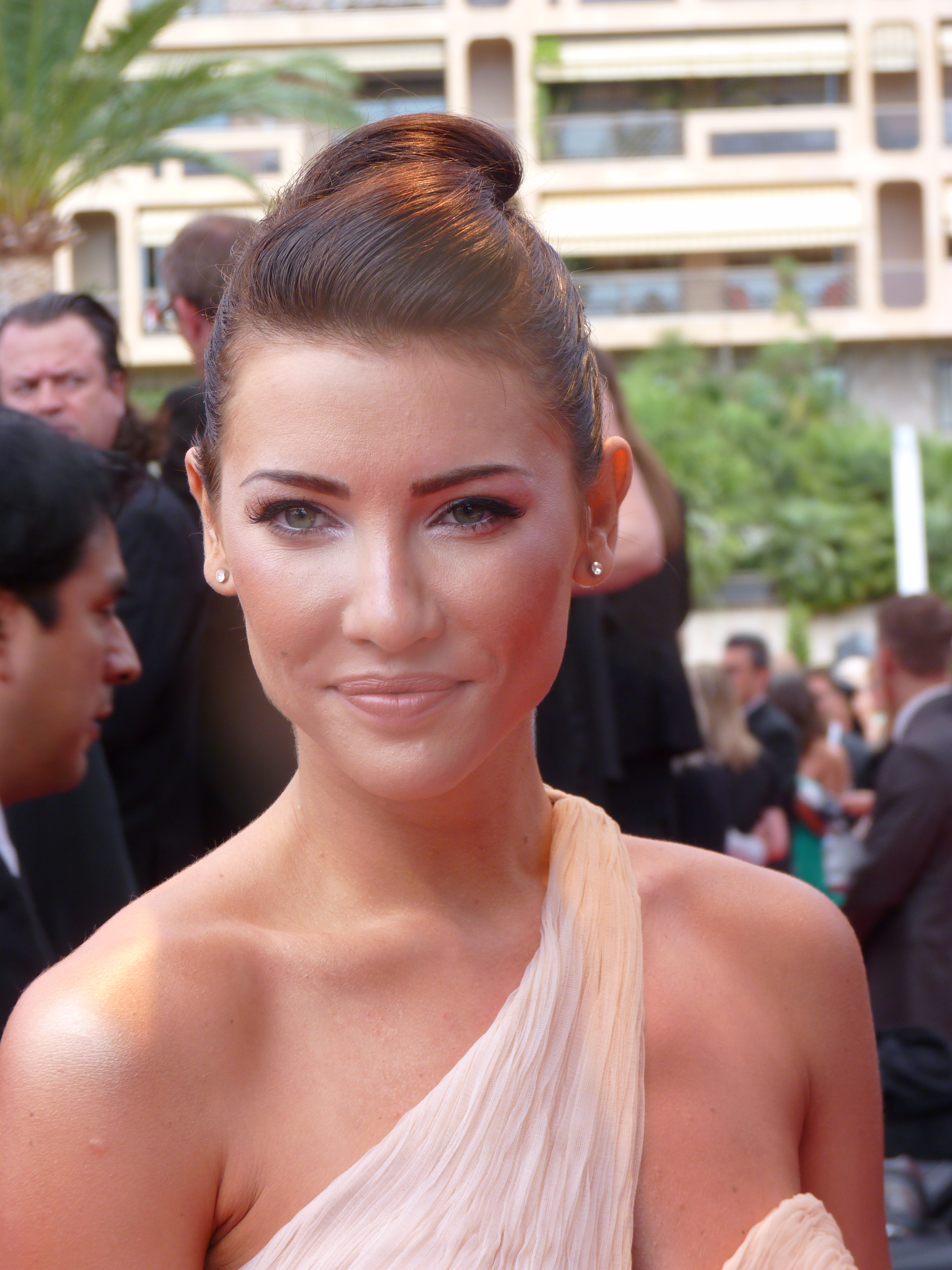
Jacqueline MacInnes Wood, Outstanding Lead Actress in a Drama Series winner

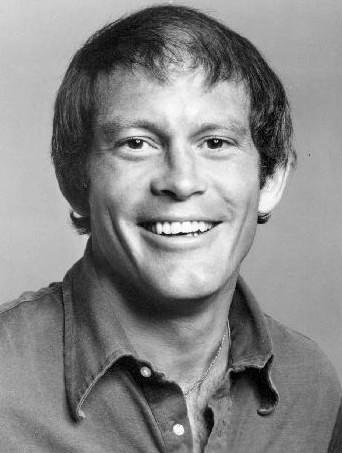
Max Gail, Outstanding Supporting Actor in a Drama Series winner.

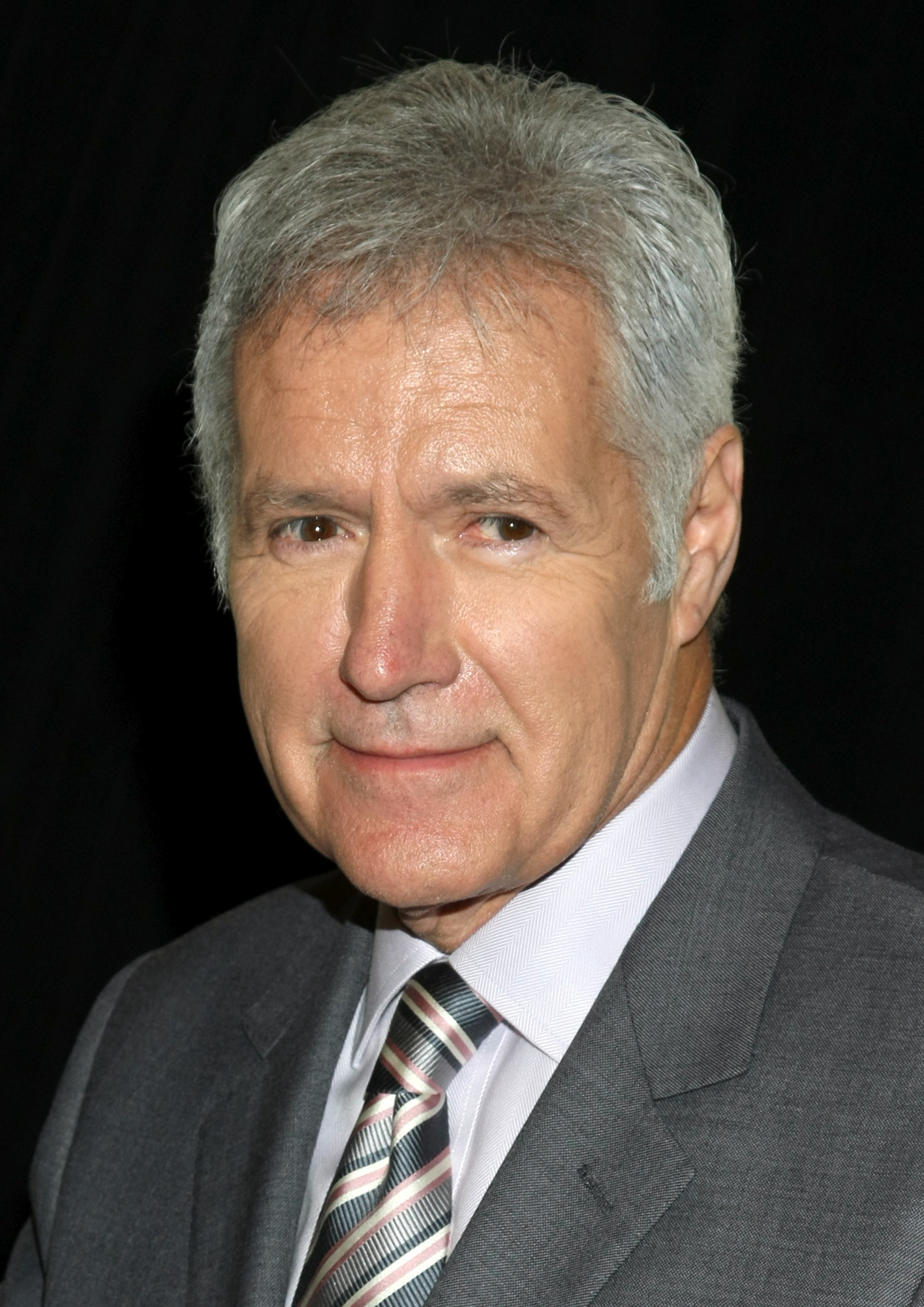
Alex Trebek, Outstanding Game Show Host winner

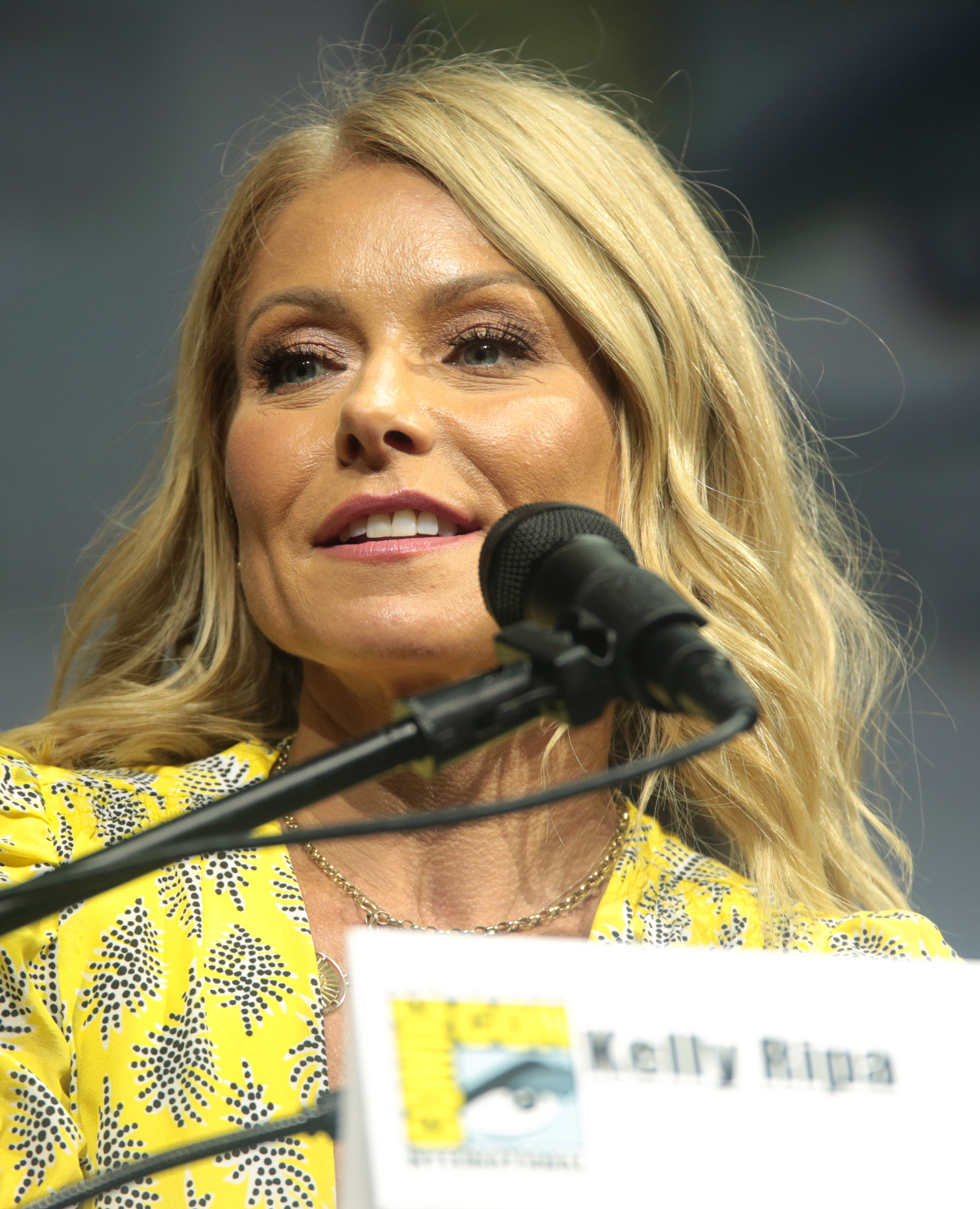
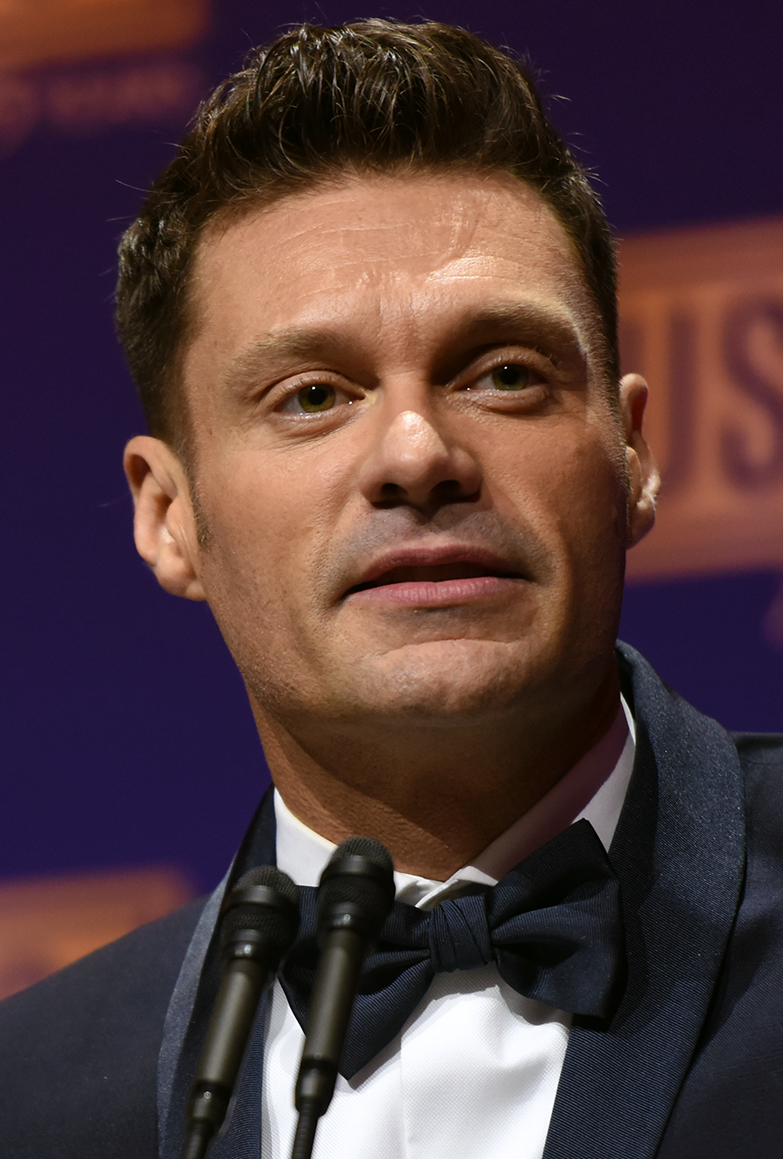
Kelly Ripa (top) and Ryan Seacrest (bottom), Outstanding Entertainment Talk Show Host winners
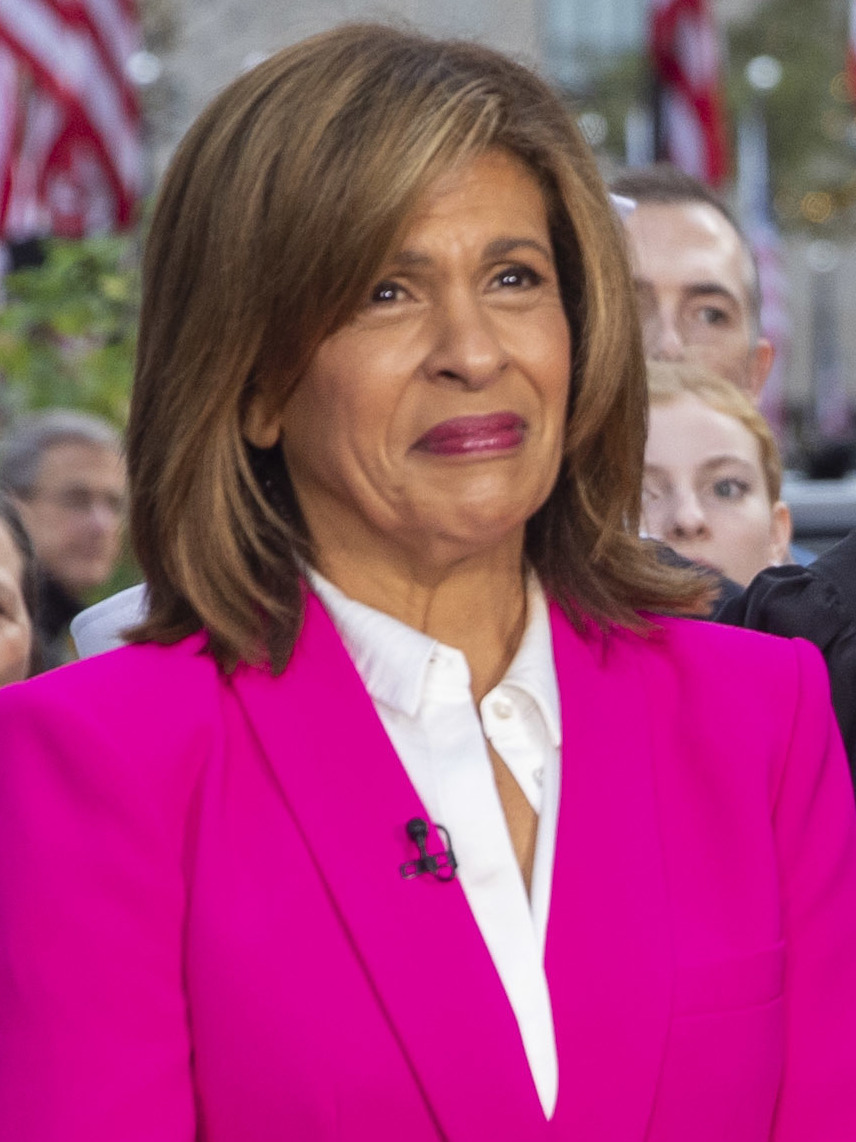
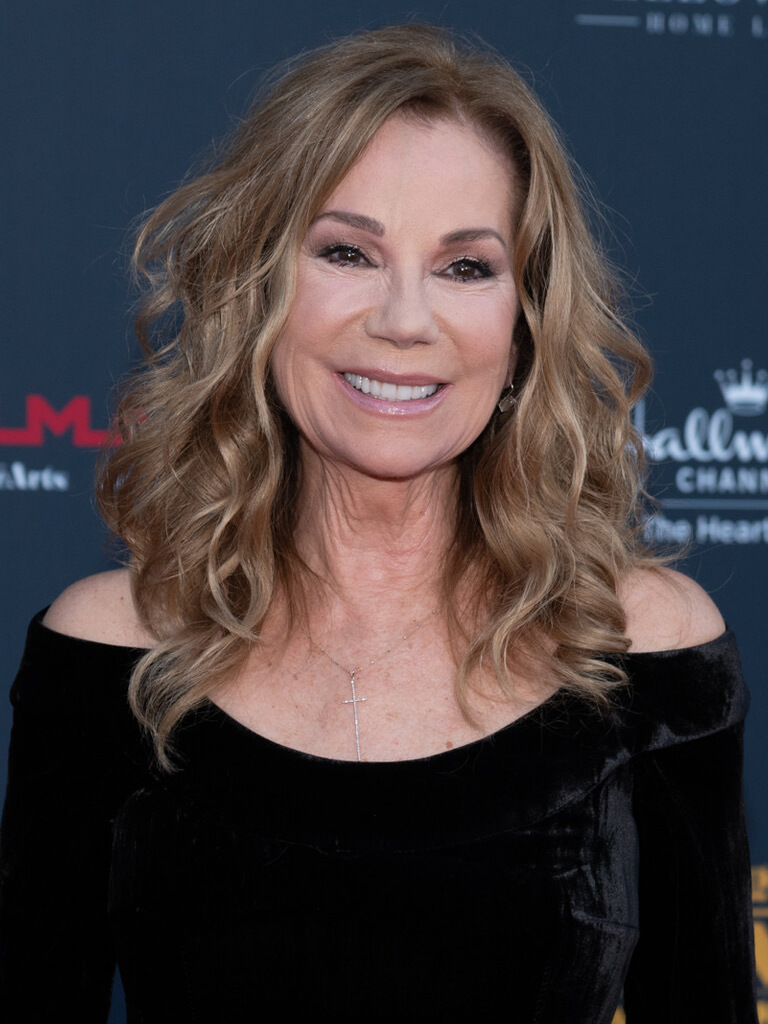
Hoda Kotb (top) and Kathie Lee Gifford (bottom), Outstanding Informative Talk Show Host winners.

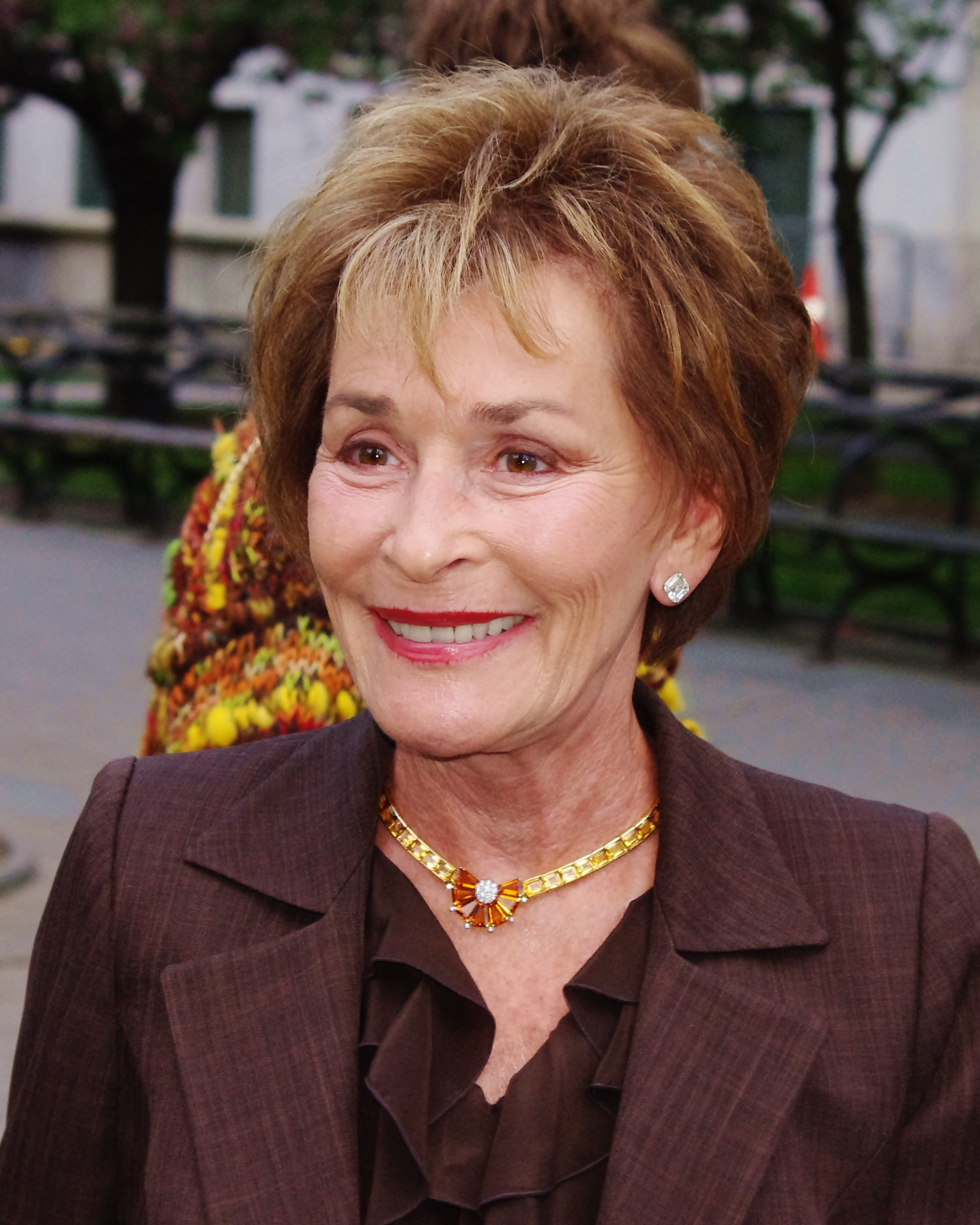
Judy Sheindlin, Lifetime Achievement Award winner

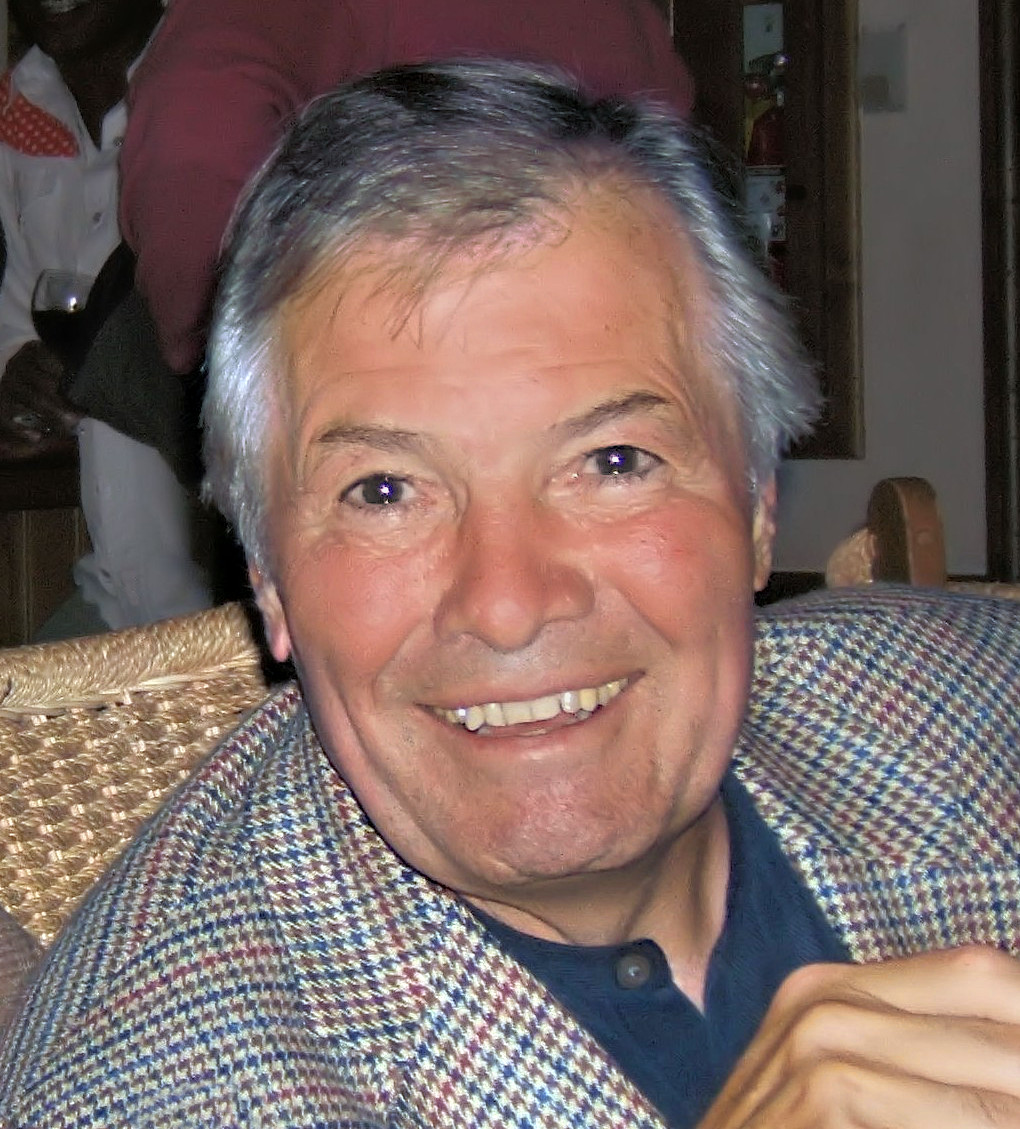
Jacques Pépin, Lifetime Achievement Award winner

Nominations were announced on March 20, 2019. Winners in each category are listed first, in boldface.

**Outstanding Drama Series**: **The Young and the Restless** (CBS); Days of Our Lives (NBC); The Bold and the Beautiful (CBS); General Hospital (ABC)	**Outstanding Digital Daytime Drama Series**: **After Forever (Amazon Studios)**; The Bay: The Series (Amazon Studios); Giants (YouTube TV); The New 30 (YouTube TV); Youth & Consequences (YouTube Premium)
**Outstanding Game Show**: **Family Feud (Syndication)**; The Price Is Right (CBS); Jeopardy! (Syndication); Let's Make a Deal (CBS); Who Wants to Be a Millionaire (Syndication)	**Outstanding Morning Program**: **CBS Sunday Morning (CBS)**; Good Morning America (ABC); CBS This Morning (CBS); Today (NBC)
**Outstanding Talk Show/Informative**: **Rachael Ray (Syndication)**; Access Live (NBC); The Dr. Oz Show (Syndication); Red Table Talk (Facebook Watch); Today Show with Kathie Lee & Hoda (NBC)	**Outstanding Talk Show/Entertainment**: **The Ellen DeGeneres Show** (Syndication); The Talk (CBS); The Real (Syndication); The View (ABC); A Little Help with Carol Burnett (Netflix)
**Outstanding Entertainment News Program**: **Daily Mail TV** (Syndication); Entertainment Tonight (Syndication); Access (Syndication); Inside Edition (Syndication); Extra (Syndication)	**Outstanding Lead Actress in a Drama Series**: **Jacqueline MacInnes Wood as Steffy Forrester, The Bold and the Beautiful (CBS)**; Marci Miller as Abigail Deveraux DiMera, Days of Our Lives (NBC); Heather Tom as Katie Logan, The Bold and the Beautiful (CBS); Maura West as Ava Jerome, General Hospital (ABC); Laura Wright as Carly Corinthos, General Hospital (ABC)
**Outstanding Lead Actor in a Drama Series**: **Maurice Benard as Sonny Corinthos, General Hospital (ABC)**; Peter Bergman as Jack Abbott, The Young and the Restless (CBS); Tyler Christopher as Stefan DiMera, Days of Our Lives (NBC); Billy Flynn as Chad DiMera, Days of Our Lives (NBC); Jon Lindstrom as Ryan Chamberlain/Kevin Collins, General Hospital (ABC)	**Outstanding Supporting Actress in a Drama Series**: **Vernee Watson as Stella Henry, General Hospital (ABC)**; Kassie DePaiva as Eve Donovan, Days of Our Lives (NBC); Linsey Godfrey as Sarah Horton, Days of Our Lives (NBC); Martha Madison as Belle Black, Days of Our Lives (NBC); Beth Maitland as Traci Abbott, The Young and the Restless (CBS); Mishael Morgan as Hilary Curtis, The Young and the Restless (CBS)
**Outstanding Supporting Actor in a Drama Series**: **Max Gail as Mike Corbin, General Hospital (ABC)**; Bryton James as Devon Hamilton, The Young and the Restless (CBS); Eric Martsolf as Brady Black, Days of Our Lives (NBC); Greg Rikaart as Leo Stark, Days of Our Lives (NBC); Dominic Zamprogna as Dante Falconeri, General Hospital (ABC)	**Outstanding Younger Actress in a Drama Series**: **Hayley Erin as Kiki Jerome, General Hospital (ABC)**; Olivia Rose Keegan as Claire Brady, Days of Our Lives (NBC); Victoria Konefal as Ciara Brady, Days of Our Lives (NBC); Chloe Lanier as Nelle Benson, General Hospital (ABC); Eden McCoy, as Josslyn Jacks, General Hospital (ABC)
**Outstanding Younger Actor in a Drama Series**: **Kyler Pettis as Theo Carver, Days of Our Lives (NBC)**; Lucas Adams as Tripp Dalton, Days of Our Lives (NBC); William Lipton as Cameron Webber, General Hospital (ABC); Garren Stitt as Oscar Nero, General Hospital (ABC); Zach Tinker as Fenmore Baldwin, The Young and the Restless (CBS)	**Outstanding Guest Performer in a Drama Series**: **Patricia Bethune as Nurse Mary Pat, General Hospital (ABC)**; Philip Anthony-Rodriguez, as Miguel Garcia, Days of Our Lives (NBC); Wayne Brady as Dr. Reese Buckingham, The Bold and the Beautiful (CBS); Kate Mansi as Abigail Deveraux, Days of Our Lives (NBC); Thaao Penghlis as Andre DiMera, Days of Our Lives (NBC)
**Outstanding Game Show Host**: **Alex Trebek, Jeopardy! (Syndication)**; Wayne Brady, Let's Make a Deal (CBS); Chris Harrison, Who Wants to Be a Millionaire (Syndication); Pat Sajak, Wheel of Fortune (Syndication); John Michael Higgins, America Says (Game Show Network)	**Outstanding Informative Talk Show Host**: **Kathie Lee Gifford and Hoda Kotb, Today Show with Kathie Lee & Hoda (NBC)**; Steve Harvey, Steve (Syndication); Dr. Mehmet Oz, The Dr. Oz Show (Syndication); Kellie Pickler and Ben Aaron, Pickler & Ben (Syndication/CMT); Rachael Ray, Rachael Ray (Syndication)
**Outstanding Entertainment Talk Show Host**: **Kelly Ripa and Ryan Seacrest, Live With Kelly and Ryan (Syndication)**; Adrienne Houghton, Loni Love, Jeannie Mai and Tamera Mowry-Housley, The Real (Syndication); Wendy Williams, The Wendy Williams Show (Syndication); Whoopi Goldberg, Joy Behar, Sara Haines, Sunny Hostin, Meghan McCain, and Abby Huntsman, The View (ABC); Julie Chen, Sara Gilbert, Sharon Osbourne, Eve, Carrie Ann Inaba, and Sheryl Underwood, The Talk (CBS)	**Outstanding Drama Series Writing Team**: **The Young and the Restless** (CBS); Days of Our Lives (NBC); The Bold and the Beautiful (CBS); General Hospital (ABC)
**Outstanding Drama Series Directing Team**: **The Young and the Restless** (CBS); Days of Our Lives (NBC); The Bold and the Beautiful (CBS); General Hospital (ABC)	**Outstanding Legal/Courtroom Program**: **Lauren Lake's Paternity Court** (Syndicated); Judge Mathis (Syndicated); Couples Court With The Cutlers (Syndicated); The People's Court (Syndicated); Judge Judy (Syndicated)

== Lifetime Achievement Awards ==
- Judge Judy Sheindlin, Judge Judy
- Jacques Pépin

== Presenters and performances ==
The following individuals presented awards or performed musical acts.

=== Presenters (in order of appearance) ===
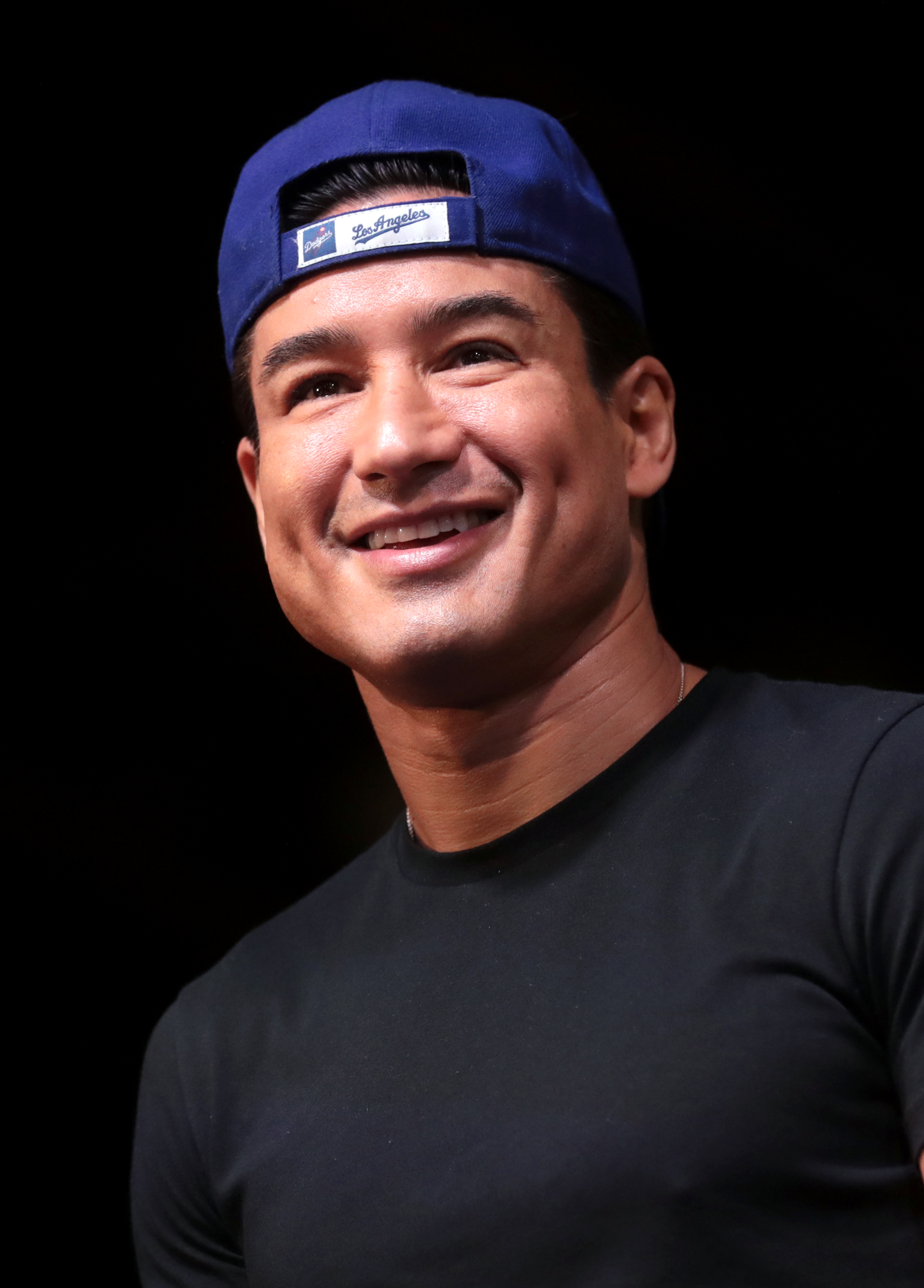
Mario Lopez served as one of the hosts and a presenter during the ceremony

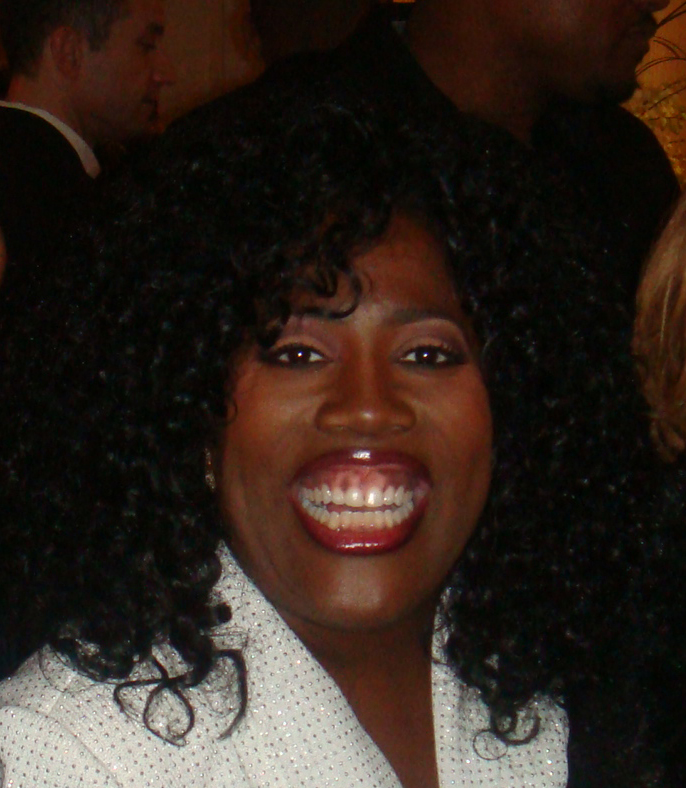
Sheryl Underwood served as one of the host and a presenter during the ceremony

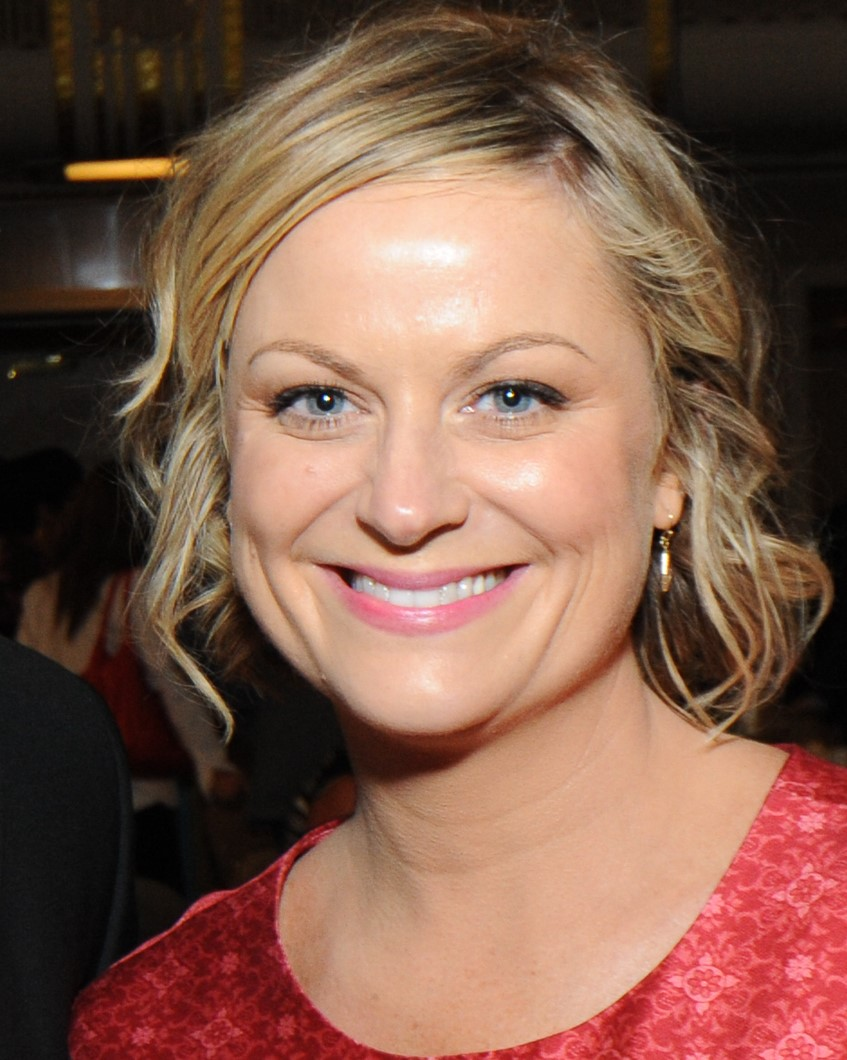
Amy Poehler was a surprise presenter for the ceremony, as she had asked to keep her appearance a secret.

Name	Role
Christian Lanz	Announcer for the 46th Annual Daytime Emmy Awards
John Michael Higgins	Presenter of the award for Outstanding Younger Actor in a Drama Series
Debbie Matenopoulos; Cameron Mathison	Presenters of the award for Outstanding Talk Show/Informative
Mario Lopez; Camila Banus	Presenters of the awards for Outstanding Entertainment Program in Spanish, Outstanding Morning Program in Spanish, and Outstanding Daytime Talent in a Spanish Language Program
Don Diamont; Darin Brooks	Presenters of the awards for Outstanding Drama Series Writing Team and Outstanding Drama Series Directing Team
Lou Diamond Phillips	Presenter of the award for Outstanding Guest Performer in a Drama Series
Terry O'Reilly (NATAS Chairman)	Special presentation highlighting the benefits of daytime television and diversity
Amy Poehler	Presenter of the Lifetime Achievement Award to Judge Judy Sheindlin
Alex Trebek	Presenter of the award for Outstanding Younger Actress in a Drama Series
Adrienne Houghton; Loni Love; Jeannie Mai; Tamera Mowry-Housley	Presenters of the award for Outstanding Legal/Courtroom Program
Rachael Ray	Presenter of the award for Outstanding Culinary Program
Mario Lopez; Sheryl Underwood	Tribue to Daytime Television Bloopers
Robin Givens; Scott Evans	Presenters of the award for Outstanding Supporting Actor in a Drama Series
Sara Gilbert; Sharon Osbourne; Eve; Carrie Ann Inaba; Sheryl Underwood	Special tribute to Kathie Lee Gifford
AJ Gibson; Mo Rocca	Presenters of the award for Outstanding Culinary Show Host
Wink Martindale; Anita Gillette	Presenters of the award for Outstanding Game Show Host and Outstanding Game Show
Kristos Andrews; James Bland	Presenters of the award for Outstanding Informative Talk Show Host
Billy Flynn; Kate Mansi; Marci Miller	Presenters of the award for Outstanding Supporting Actress in a Drama Series
David Osmond; Joely Fisher	Introducers of Roslyn Kind and In Memoriam tribute
Lee Cowan	Special tribute of the 40th anniversary of CBS Sunday Morning
Abby Cadabby; Elmo; Mario Lopez; Sheryl Underwood; Alan Muraoka	Special tribute to the 50th anniversary of Sesame Street
Mario Lopez; Nico Lopez; Abby Cadabby; Elmo; Alan Muraoka	Presenters of the award for Outstanding Morning Program
Steve Burton; Ingo Rademacher	Presenters of the award for Outstanding Lead Actress in a Drama Series
Jesse Palmer; Brandon McMillan	Presenters of the award for Outstanding Entertainment Talk Show Host
Kellie Pickler; Ben Aaron	Presenters of the award for Outstanding Digital Daytime Drama Series
Mario Lopez; Dayna Devon; Charissa Thompson	Special tribute to the 25th anniversary of Extra
Kevin Frazier; Nancy O'Dell	Presenters of the award for Outstanding Lead Actor in a Drama Series
Daniel Goddard; Melissa Ordway	Presenters of the award for Outstanding Talk Show/Entertainment
Shemar Moore	Presenter of the award for Outstanding Drama Series

=== Performers ===
Name(s)	Role	Performed
The Caleb Martin & Daytime Band	Music Director	Band
Alan Muraoka; Joely Fisher; David Osmond; Others	Performers	"Sing" and "Can You Tell Me How to Get to Sesame Street?" as the opening act and as part of the 50th Anniversary tribute of Sesame Street
Roslyn Kind	Performer	"How Do You Keep the Music Playing?" during the annual In Memoriam tribute

== In Memoriam ==
- Bob Phillips Jr.
- Frank Parker
- Maureen Heaton
- Ken Kercheval
- Tommie Skinner
- Harding Lemay
- Joseph Campanella
- Rick Pessagno
- Stephen Hilleburg
- Carol Channing
- Peggy McCay
- Michael Dimich
- Barbara Claman
- Schafer "Scha" Jani
- Donna Messina
- Burt Reynolds
- Gary Schaub
- Elizabeth Sung
- Aretha Franklin
- Jed Allan
- Robert Mandan
- Christopher Kennedy Lawford
- Carol Hall
- Susan Brown
- Ernie Dellutri
- Charlotte Rae
- Luke Perry
- Kristoff St. John
