= Love Games: Bad Girls Need Love Too season 1 =

Love Games: Bad Girls Need Love Too
- Season 1
- No. of episodes: 8

Release
- Original network: Oxygen
- Original release: March 16 – May 4, 2010

Season chronology
- Next → Season 2

The first season of Love Games: Bad Girls Need Love Too premiered on March 16, 2010, after the fourth season Bad Girls Club reunion. It is the second spin-off to Bad Girls Club. The first season ran for eight episodes and is hosted by Bret Ernst.

== Format ==
Alumni from previous seasons of Bad Girls Club are "looking for the man of their dreams." It takes place in one of the original "Bad Girl" houses used to film previous seasons. Three "bad girls" have a choice of 13 bachelors to explore love, friendships, etc. Competing in love games with thirteen eligible bachelors to find their perfect match and prove they are the best of the bunch. Each weeks features a variety of challenges and group dates. As the show goes on, the dates become more solo while the girls "pick the man of their dreams."

== Premise ==
Love Games features three former "bad girls" from Bad Girls Club— Amber Meade and Sarah Michaels, both of season three, and Kendra James of season four. The show revolves around the three girls trying to find the right man out of thirteen bachelors. Each week features challenges for the bachelors and group dates.

Bret Ernst hosts the eight one-hour episode season. It premiered after The Bad Girls Club's season four first two-part reunion special on March 16, 2010, at 11 p.m. ET/PT. It moved to its regular timeslot on March 30 at 10 p.m. ET/PT. The season finale aired on May 4, 2010.

== Cast ==
=== "Bad Girls" ===
Name	BGC season	Eliminated
Sarah Michaels	Season 3	Winner
Kendra James	Season 4	Runner-up
Amber Meade	Season 3	Episode 7

=== Contestants ===
Name	Hometown	Age	Nickname	Eliminated
Nick Christensen	San Diego, California	23	The Scarred Lover	Winner (chosen by Sarah)
Matt Cosmos	Middlebury, Connecticut	26	The Rowdy Athlete	Runner-up (chosen by Kendra)
Tim Holloway	Pevely, Missouri	21	The Businessman	Episode 8
Justin Redd	Fullerton, California	29	The Player	Episode 8
Joe Piccirello	Glendale, Arizona	21	The Guy Next Door	Episode 7
Dan Michael	Seattle, Washington	24	The Hopeless Romantic	Episode 6
Devan Greene	Sherman Oaks, California	30	Mister Universe	Episode 5
Akoni Clubb	Makawao, Hawaii	24	Lei’d Back Surfer	Episode 4
Michael Hopkins	Syracuse, New York	27	The Intellect	Episode 3
Dante Ross	Barrington, New Jersey	29	The Jersey Chef	Episode 2
Kyle Tosh	Cleveland, Ohio	30	Small Town Thrill Seeker	Episode 1
Dathan Brown	Albuquerque, New Mexico	22	The Devout Christian	Episode 1
Joey Malloque	Gig Harbor, Washington	24	MILF Hunter	Episode 1

== Elimination chart ==
	Episode 1		Episode 2	Episode 3	Episode 4	Episode 5	Episode 6	Episode 7	Episode 8
Trophy Winner	Devan	None	Akoni	Nick	Devan	Devan	Justin	Nick	Nick
Bottom Three	Dan; Joey	Akoni; Dan; Kyle	Tim; Devan; Dante	Dan; Devan; Michael	Nick; Justin; Akoni	Matt; Joe; Devan	Tim; Nick; Dan	Tim; Matt; Joe	
Matt	Safe	Safe	Safe	Safe	Safe	Bottom 3 (Kendra)	Safe	Bottom 3 (Sarah)	Winner (Kendra)
Justin	Safe	Safe	Safe	Safe	Bottom 3 (Amber)	Safe	Trophy	Safe	Eliminated (Episode 8)
Tim	Safe	Safe	Bottom 3 (Kendra)	Safe	Safe	Safe	Bottom 3 (Amber)	Bottom 3 (Amber)	Eliminated (Episode 8)
Joe	Safe	Safe	Safe	Safe	Safe	Bottom 3 (Sarah)	Safe	Bottom 3 (Kendra)	Eliminated (Episode 7)
Dan	Bottom 2	Bottom 3 (Sarah)	Safe	Bottom 3 (Amber)	Safe	Safe	Bottom 3 (Sarah)	Eliminated (Episode 6)	
Devan	Trophy	Safe	Bottom 3 (Sarah)	Bottom 3 (Kendra)	Trophy	Trophy (Amber)	Eliminated (Episode 5)		
Akoni	Safe	Bottom 3 (Amber)	Trophy	Safe	Bottom 3 (Sarah)	Eliminated (Episode 4)			
Michael	Safe	Safe	Safe	Bottom 3 (Sarah)	Eliminated (Episode 3)				
Dante	Safe	Safe	Bottom 3 (Amber)	Eliminated (Episode 2)					
Kyle	Safe	Bottom 3 (Kendra)	Eliminated (Episode 1)						
Dathan	Safe	Safe	Expelled (Episode 1)						
Joey	Bottom 2	Eliminated (Episode 1)							
Notes	See note 1	See note 2	none			See note 3	none	See note 4	none

=== Notes ===
- ^Note 1: In Episode 1, Joey was eliminated for being ranked last in the challenge.
- ^Note 2: In Episode 1, Dathan was expelled from the house by Kendra, Amber, and Sarah for having a current girlfriend.
- ^Note 3: In Episode 5, Devan was eliminated despite winning the Trophy Challenge.
- ^Note 4: In Episode 7, Amber was also eliminated.

== Episodes ==
No.	Title	Original release date
1	"What a Girl Wants!"	March 16, 2010
Three original "bad girls", Amber Meade, Kendra James, and Sarah Michaels, from previous seasons of Bad Girls Club are searching for the "man of their dreams" out of thirteen bachelors. It features challenges, dates, eliminations, etc. The season started out with all thirteen bachelors walking up the drive-way of Bad Girls Club Season 4 mansion. The mansion has been remodeled to make the room where Kate, Kendra, and Amber slept into a masculine room for the bachelors. There are thirteen beds, one for each bachelor with a moose head mounted above the fireplace. Other rooms in the house were redecorated like the pool-room, kitchen, and where the phone room was in Season 4 to a bed hanging by chains. Three bachelors are removed/eliminated in this episode/ Notes: Joey is eliminated. Dathan is removed. Kyle is eliminated.
2	"Fired Up"	March 23, 2010
The guys faced a challenged for cooking for the three "bad girls." With the girls able to pick two bachelors for their date, Sarah only picked Tim because he was the only one who cooked for her. Sarah and Tim make a connection with each other. There's tension between Dante and Dan. Notes: Dante is eliminated.
3	"Rhythm Method"	March 30, 2010
The bachelors faced a challenge to sing to the girls. In each box they had to wrap was a genre of music they would have to sing. Amber, Kendra, or Sarah will get the gift. The bachelor who wrapped the present one of the girls picked had to create a song to serenade to whoever opened the present. Tensions flare up between Tim and Nick for Sarah's love. Notes: Michael is eliminated.
4	"Shop or Be Dropped"	April 6, 2010
The bachelors had to face a challenge of buying dresses an accessories for the girls. There were two teams of four bachelors. At the club, Nick tried to get Sarah jealous by flirting with Kendra. Amber opened herself to new men, including Dan. Kendra is confused on which men to focus on. Notes: Akoni is eliminated.
5	"Hang Tough"	April 13, 2010
The bachelors faced a challenge of athletics. The guys had to swim and save the sex toy doll, race, and carry the girls across the beach with dropping her. Shannon makes another connection with Tim. Notes: Devan is eliminated.
6	"Kicked to the Curb"	April 20, 2010
Two groups of the bachelors scatter the streets of L.A. to find items on a certain list. The winning group had to go on another scavenger hunt with the ladies on finding romantic and sexual sentences of other languages. The first bachelor and "bad girl" back got to have special time together on top of the double-decker bus. Notes: Dan is eliminated.
7	"Couple Up"	April 27, 2010
Tanisha Thomas from season 2 of Bad Girls Club guest stars. The guys had to face the challenge on devoting their love to the "bad girl" they're focusing on in an unusual way. At elimination, host Bret Ernst tells the girls shocking news that they have to also eliminate one of the "bad girls." Notes: Joe and Amber are eliminated.
8	"Last Man Standing"	May 4, 2010
The "bad girls" have the final decision to what bachelor they would pick. Each bachelor gets to have a solo date with the "bad girl" they were focusing on. At the end, Kendra and Sarah pick which bachelor they want to be with. At the end, Amber picks who the winning couple is. Notes: Justin and Tim are eliminated. Kendra picks Matt; Sarah picks Nick. Nick and Sarah are the winning couple.
