= Tanisha Thomas =

American reality television personality

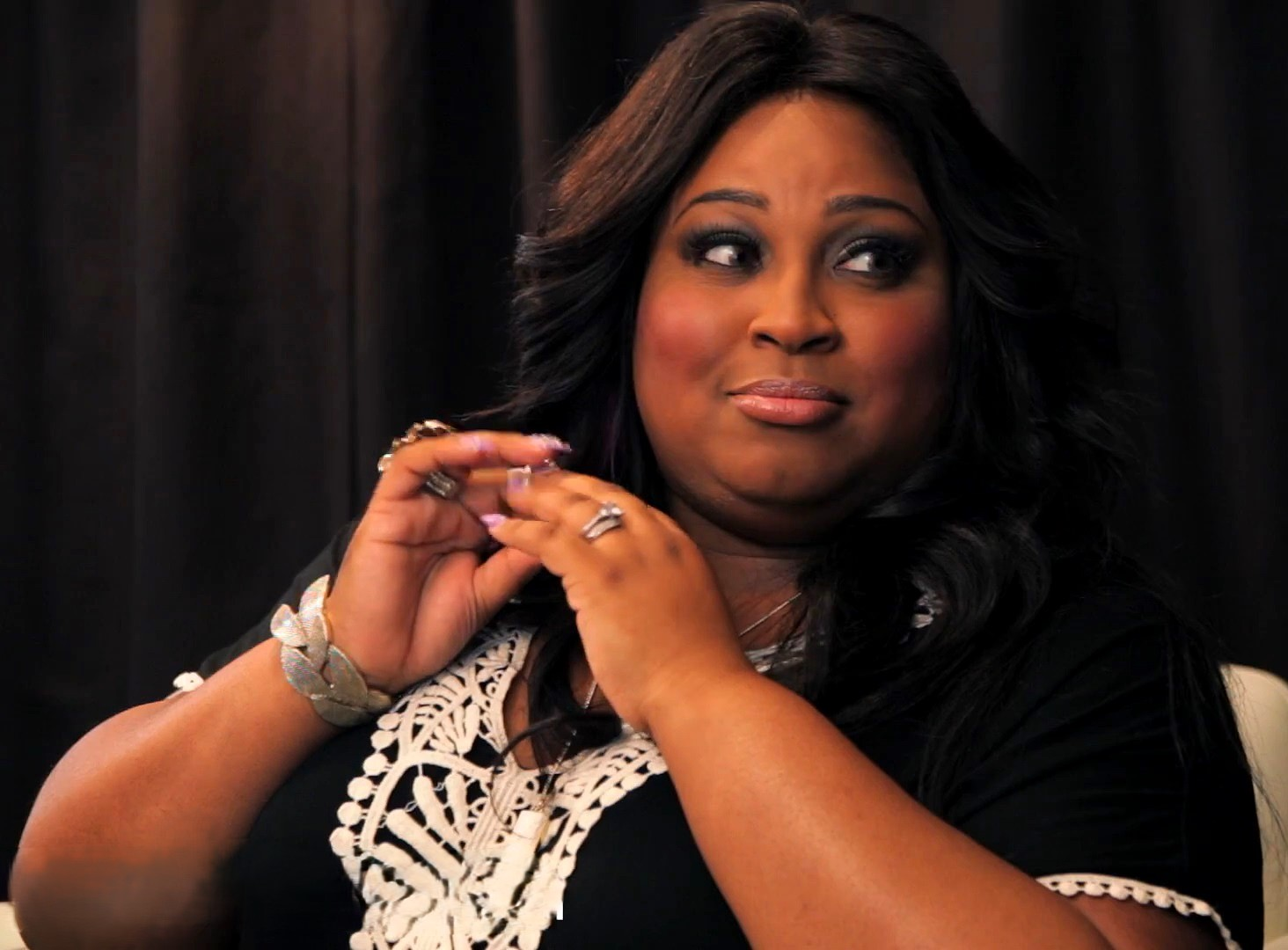
- Thomas in 2012
- Occupations: Television producer; television presenter
- Years active: 2007–present
- Television: Bad Girls Club, Baddies, House of Villains
- Spouse: Clive Muir (m. 2011; div. 2014)
- Children: 1

Tanisha Thomas is an American reality television producer. She is best known for her appearance on the second season of the Oxygen Network series Bad Girls Club. In 2023, Thomas became the winner of the first season of E! Network's reality competition show House of Villains.

== Television career ==
In 2007, Thomas sent a casting tape to the casting directors of the Bad Girls Club. Thomas was chosen as one of the seven "bad girls" for the second season. The season took place in Los Angeles. Thomas quickly became a fan favorite. Her most famous moment from the show came from Thomas banging pots and pans, yelling, "I ain't get no sleep cuz' of y'all! Now y'all not gonna get no sleep cuz' of me!", due to her fellow cast members keeping her awake late during the night.

In 2015 the pots and pans clip resurfaced on social media platform Vine, with the clip gaining over seven million views. It became a meme with fans remixing it in to real songs, most notably Fifth Harmony's Worth It. During the show, Thomas feuded with fellow cast member Jennavecia Russo, ultimately ending in Thomas and Russo getting in to a physical altercation due to Russo filling Thomas' juice with tabasco sauce. During the reunion special, Thomas almost got into a physical altercation with fellow cast member Lyric Greene, after Greene claimed Thomas was a cheeseburger away from being obese.

In 2008, Thomas was a guest on The Tyra Banks Show, with the rest of her cast members from the Bad Girls Club. She made a cameo appearance in an episode of Kathy Griffin: My Life on The D-List. In 2009, Thomas made a brief cameo in the third season of the Bad Girls Club, by pranking the new set of cast members pretending to be a replacement bad girl.

In 2010, Thomas was a contestant on VH1's Celebrity Fit Club. Thomas was a part of the blue team alongside; High School Musical actress Kaycee Stroh, Britney Spears' ex-boyfriend Kevin Federline and Skid Row front man Sebastian Bach. The blue team won the competition, Thomas lost a total of 24lbs. Thomas co-hosted Bad Girls Club special, Bad Girls Club Top 10 OMG Moments 1-5, alongside season 1 cast member; Aimee Landi, season 3 cast member; Amber Meade and season 4 cast members; Florina Kaja and Natalie Nunn.

In January 2011, Oxygen Network released OxygenLive!, an online talk show hosted by Thomas. Thomas attended the Bad Girls Club season 6: Hollywood reunion as a special guest alongside season 3 cast member; Amber Meade and season 5 cast member; Kristen Guinane. Thomas made a guest appearance during a challenge on the first season of Bad Girls Club spin-off; Love Games: Bad Girls Need Love Too. Thomas was the official host for the second, third and fourth seasons of the show. Thomas also featured in Bad Girls Club special, Bad Girls Club: Flo Gets Married.

In 2011, American television producer SallyAnn Salsano wanted to film Thomas' upcoming wedding and wedding planning with her fiancé. Salsano alongside Joel Zimmer, held a press conference to present Thomas with the documentary idea, Thomas ultimately agreed and filming began shortly after. The documentary was titled Tanisha Gets Married, it consisted of seven one-hour episodes airing Monday nights on the Oxygen network. The show debuted with 1,073,000 viewers, becoming Oxygen's best ever docu-series premiere according to TV by the Numbers. Compared against Oxygen's time slots in April 2012, Tanisha Gets Married was a 96% increase in all of Oxygen's key demos. According to SocialGuide, Tanisha Gets Married ranked number four on the most social series amongst all cable series.

Thomas became the official host of the Bad Girls Club reunions. Her first reunion special would be for Bad Girls Club season 8: Las Vegas, she would be the reunion host until the shows final season, Bad Girls Club season 17: East Meets West. Thomas was also the reunion host for the spin-off Bad Girls All-Star Battle. In 2013 Thomas starred in a Smurfs 2 commercial alongside former Bad Girl alumni, Camilla Poindexter. In 2014, Thomas and her then-husband, Clive Muir, appeared as contestants on We TV's, Marriage Boot Camp Reality Stars season 1. Between 2014-2015, Thomas made several guest appearances on shows such as; Love & Hip Hop: New York, Girlfriend Intervention, David Tutera's CELEBrations, Maury and Love & Hip Hop: Atlanta.

In 2015, Thomas became the co-host on the short lived NBC comedy talk show, Crazy Talk, alongside comedian Ben Aaron. Thomas was the co-host for eighteen episodes before leaving the show. Between 2015-2016, Thomas appeared as a guest on multiple episodes of the Steve Harvey show.

In 2021, Thomas was featured in E! networks docu-series, For Real The Story of Reality TV. Highlighting her time on the Bad Girls Club. Thomas took part in Zeus network's, reality series, Baddies ATL. Thomas secured a role as executive producer as well as a cast member. Thomas did not return for the second season as a cast member or executive producer.

In 2023, Thomas was a contestant on E! networks reality competition show, House of Villains. Thomas was the winner of the first season defeating Johnny Bananas in the finale winning the $200,000 cash prize and title of America's ultimate supervillain.

== Personal life ==
Thomas was born and raised in Flatbush, Brooklyn.

Thomas married Clive Muir at the Thatched Cottage in Long Island, New York, on December 4 2011. In 2014, the couple separated and divorced. In 2016, she began dating Carey St. Hilaire. In October 2017, Thomas announced that she and St. Hilaire were expecting their first child together. On March 7, 2018, she gave birth to a boy.

Thomas is good friends with Barbadian singer Rihanna. Thomas attended her baby shower in 2022.

== Filmography ==
=== Film and television ===
Year	Title	Role	Notes
2007	Bad Girls Club season 2	Self; original cast	24 episodes
2008	The Tyra Banks Show	Self; guest	1 episode
2008	Kathy Griffin: My Life on the D-List	Self; guest	1 episode
2009	Bad Girls Club season 3	Self; guest	1 episode
2010	Celebrity Fit Club: Boot Camp 2 season 7	Self; contestant	Winner, 10 episodes
2010	Love Games: Bad Girls Need Love Too season 1	Self; guest	1 episode
2010	Bad Girls Club Top Ten OMG Moments 1-5	Self; co-host	TV special
2010	Undatable	Self; contestant	4 episodes
2011	Bad Girls Club season 6: Hollywood	Self; reunion audience member	2 episodes
2011	OxygenLive!	Self; host	
2011	Bad Girls Club: Flo Gets Married	Self; guest	TV special
2011-2013	Love Games: Bad Girls Need Love Too season 2-4	Self; host	25 episodes
2012	Tanisha Gets Married	Self	TV special
2012-2017	Bad Girls Club	Self; reunion host	26 episodes
2012	Bad Girls Club Double Trouble: The Twins Speak	Self; host	TV special
2013-2014	Bad Girls All-Star Battle	Self; reunion host	6 episodes
2013	The Real Housewives of Atlanta	Self; guest	1 episode
2014	Marriage Boot Camp: Reality Stars	Self; contestant	8 episodes
2014	Girlfriend Intervention	Self; guest	1 episode
2014	David Tutera's CELEBrations	Self; guest	1 episode
2014	Bad Girls Club: Funniest Bad Girls of All Time	Self; co-host	TV special
2014	Maury	Self; audience member	1 episode
2014	Love & Hip Hop: Hollywood	Self; guest	1 episode
2015	Marriage Boot Camp Reality Stars: Where Are They Now?	Self	TV special
2015	Love & Hip Hop: Atlanta	Self; reunion audience member	1 episode
2015	Dish Nation	Self; guest	1 episode
2015	Crazy Talk	Self; co-host	18 episodes
2015-2016	Steve Harvey	Self; guest	4 episodes
2016	Tanisha The Diva	Self; host	
2018	Little Annie Beth	Cameo	Short film
2021	For Real: The Story of Reality TV	Self; guest	Documentary
2021	Baddies ATL	Self; executive producer	Web series, 12 episodes
2022	The Clown Killers	Sasha	
2023	House of Villains season 1	Self; contestant	Winner, 10 episodes
2023	Entertainment Tonight	Self; guest	1 episode
2025-2026	Baddies USA	Self; recurring	Web series, 3 episodes
2026	Bad Girls Club: Unfinished Business	Self; host, Executive Producer	Currently filming
