= Love Games: Bad Girls Need Love Too season 2 =

Love Games: Bad Girls Need Love Too
- Season 2
- No. of episodes: 8

Release
- Original network: Oxygen
- Original release: April 18 – June 13, 2011

Season chronology
- ← Previous; Season 1 Next → Season 3

The second season of Love Games: Bad Girls Need Love Too premiered on April 18, 2011, with Bad Girls Club alumni Tanisha Thomas as the host.

== Format ==
Alumni from previous seasons of The Bad Girls Club are "looking for the man of their dreams." The show is set in the Canfield-Moreno Estate. Three "bad girls" have a choice of 15 bachelors to explore love, friendships, etc. Each week features a variety of challenges.

The "bad girls" battle it out and compete to be the "HBIC" - Tanisha Thomas says that it stands for not Head Bitch In Charge, but instead Head Badgirl in Charge. Instead of season 1 with each "bad girl" choosing who is up for elimination, the "HBIC" chooses who is up for elimination.

== Cast ==
=== "Bad Girls" ===
Name	Season	Rank
Lea Beaulieu	Season 5	Winner
Natalie Nunn	Season 4	Runner–up
Amber Buhl	Season 3	Episode 7

=== Contestants ===
Name	Age	Hometown	Title name	Eliminated
Robert	21	Miami, FL	"The Boy Toy"	Winner
Benz	23	Boston, MA	"The Smooth Operator"	Episode 8, runner-up
Nick	24	Honolulu, HI	"The Sly One"	Episode 8
Corey B.	22	Chicago, IL	"The Nice Guy"	Episode 8
Taylor	25	Tuscaloosa, AL	"The Preppy"	Episode 8
Jason	22	Oakland, CA	"The Troublemaker"	Episode 7
Bruno	26	Dallas, TX	"The Prankster"	Episode 6
Emilio Masella	27	East Haven, CT	"Mr. Snooki"	Episode 5
John	24	Kansas City, MO	"The Gentle Giant"	Episode 5 (quit)
Ryan	22	Jersey City, NJ	"The Tatted Guy"	Episode 4
Corey W.	29	Seattle, WA	"The Player"	Episode 3
Matthew	21	Los Angeles, CA	"The Romantic"	Episode 3
Robert A.	23	San Francisco, CA	"The Lap Dog"	Episode 2
Eduardo	22	Bronx, NY	"The Bronx Guy"	Episode 2
Greg	23	Chicago, IL	"The Promoter"	Episode 1

== Elimination chart ==
	Episode 1	Episode 2	Episode 3	Episode 4	Episode 5	Episode 6	Episode 7	Episode 8
H.B.I.C.	Lea	Amber	Amber	Natalie	Amber	Natalie	Natalie	(none)
Bottom Three	Greg; Eduardo; Matthew	Eduardo; Robert A. Taylor	Matthew; Corey W. Benz	Ryan; Robert R. Benz	Emilio; Bruno; Jason	Bruno; Benz; Robert R.	Jason; Corey B. Nick	(none)
Bad Girl Eliminated	N/A						Amber	Natalie
Lea	HBIC	Lose	Lose	Lose	Lose	Lose	Lose	
Natalie	Lose	Lose	Lose	HBIC	Lose	HBIC	HBIC	
Amber	Lose	HBIC	HBIC	Lose	HBIC	Lose	Lose	
Robert R.	Safe	Safe	Safe	Bottom 3	Safe	Bottom 3	Safe	Winner (Lea)
Benz	Safe	Safe	Bottom 3	Bottom 3	Safe	Bottom 3	Safe	Eliminated (Episode 8)
Nick	Safe	Safe	Safe	Safe	Safe	Safe	Bottom 3	Eliminated (Episode 8)
Corey B.	Safe	Safe	Safe	Safe	Safe	Safe	Bottom 3	Eliminated (Episode 8)
Taylor	Safe	Bottom 3	Safe	Safe	Safe	Safe	Safe	Eliminated (Episode 8)
Jason	Safe	Safe	Safe	Safe	Bottom 3	Safe	Eliminated (Episode 7)	
Bruno	Safe	Safe	Safe	Safe	Bottom 3	Eliminated (Episode 6)		
Emilio	Safe	Safe	Safe	Safe	Eliminated (Episode 5)			
John	Safe	Safe	Safe	Safe	Quit (Episode 5)			
Ryan	Safe	Safe	Safe	Eliminated (Episode 4)				
Corey W.	Safe	Safe	Eliminated (Episode 3)					
Matthew	Bottom 3	Safe	Eliminated (Episode 3)					
Robert A.	Safe	Eliminated (Episode 2)						
Eduardo	Bottom 3	Eliminated (Episode 2)						
Greg	Eliminated (Episode 1)							
Notes	none			See note 1	none	See note 2	See note 3	See note 4 See note 5

- ^Note 1: In Episode 5, John quit after realizing he had stronger feelings for his current girlfriend Johanna and not the other girls.
- ^Note 2: In Episode 7, Amber was also eliminated.
- ^Note 3: In Episode 8, the guys got to choose which girl to eliminate. Tanisha informed the guys that chose the eliminated girl would be automatically eliminated. In the end, Lea had enough votes to stay, thus winning Love Games. Natalie was eliminated along with Corey B. and Taylor.
- ^Note 4: In Episode 8, after the second Bad Girl went home, Lea eliminated Nick.
- ^Note 5: In Episode 8, Lea eliminated Benz before the Final Elimination, because Benz told Lea to pick Robert while on their date together.

== Episodes ==
No.	Title	Original release date
1	"Game On"	April 18, 2011
Three former Bad Girls and 15 hot guys move into a swanky mansion looking for love. But when the games start, there is no stopping them. Let the backstabbing begin!
2	"Punch Drunk Love"	April 25, 2011
Fresh off of losing some serious ground in the game, a scorned Natalie takes matters into her own hands — and those hands turn into fists.
3	"Whatever It Takes"	May 2, 2011
Amber begins to seriously play the field in an attempt to find guys she can count on to help her win the competition. However, not everyone is playing straight with her.
4	"And In This Corner"	May 9, 2011
Natalie uses some fancy footwork to gain the upper hand, but all the power goes to her head when she drops a bomb on an unsuspecting guy and causes World War III in the house.
5	"Guess Who's Coming to Love Games"	May 16, 2011
Surprise visitors to the Love Games house are a welcomed distraction. However, too much jealousy sparks some serious in-fighting between some of the guys.
6	"Lewd, Prude and Otherwise"	May 23, 2011
Amber's teasing causes the guys to question her intentions as she risks losing her already shaky position in the game.
7	"And Then There Were Two"	June 6, 2011
The allegiance between the girls and their stable of guys is put to the ultimate test with a series of ever increasingly outrageous dares; one Bad Girl will go home for good.
8	"Last Bad Girl Standing"	June 13, 2011
The Love Game reaches new heights and tables are turned when the guys decide which Bad Girl will survive the final elimination
