= Crazy Talk =

American talk show (2015–2016)

- Genre: Comedy; Reality talk
- Created by: Paul Faulhaber
- Presented by: Ben Aaron; Tanisha Thomas (September–December 2015)
- Country of origin: United States
- Original language: English
- No. of seasons: 1
- No. of episodes: 60

Production
- Executive producer: Paul Faulhaber
- Production locations: Stamford Media Center, Stamford, Connecticut
- Running time: 22 minutes
- Production company: Faulhaber Media

Original release
- Release: September 14, 2015 – March 2016

Crazy Talk is an American comedy/talk show that debuted in first-run syndication in the United States and Canada on September 14, 2015 hosted by comedian Ben Aaron and reality personality Tanisha Thomas. The series ended in first-run form in late March 2016, with repeats airing until September 9, 2016.

== Details ==
The series acted as a compilation of outrageous moments contained on conflict talk shows, some court shows, and various reality television programs in the vein of E!'s The Soup, but in a daily format with a surrounding studio audience and the hosts giving comedic commentary. The hosts occasionally talked to guests and participants about their behind-the-scenes experiences and sharing and commenting on clips.

The half-hour show was created and produced by Maury executive producer Paul Faulhaber, and taped at the Rich Forum in Stamford, Connecticut, which is alternately known as the Stamford Media Center, where other shows are produced, including the NBCUniversal triad of conflict talk shows, which includes Jerry Springer, Maury and The Steve Wilkos Show. As such, the program also served as a companion to the aforementioned conflict talkers, though on many stations was a late-night extension scheduled separately from them.

The show premiered with Bad Girls Club alum Tanisha Thomas as a co-host with Aaron, but she departed the series before the program went on hiatus for the holidays in 2015, and it became a program solely hosted by Aaron.

According to a ratings rundown in March 2016, the program ended production as of that month (it also timed out to Aaron temporarily moving to the West Coast to support his wife Ginger Zee during her run on season 22 of Dancing with the Stars).
