= Love Games: Bad Girls Need Love Too =

2010 American reality television series

- Genre: Dating game show
- Presented by: Tanisha Thomas
- Country of origin: United States
- Original language: English
- No. of seasons: 4
- No. of episodes: 33

Production
- Executive producers: Gil Goldschein; Jonathan Murray; Rick DeOliveira
- Running time: 40-44 minutes
- Production company: Bunim/Murray Productions

Original release
- Network: Oxygen
- Release: March 16, 2010 – January 15, 2013

Related
- Bad Girls Road Trip

Love Games: Bad Girls Need Love Too is an American reality television dating game show that premiered on Oxygen on March 16, 2010. It is the second spin-off of Bad Girls Club. Three "bad girls" from previous seasons of Bad Girls Club are "looking for the man of their dreams" out of thirteen eligible bachelors. Comedian Bret Ernst hosted the first season.

The show was renewed for its third season, which premiered December 5, 2011. Tanisha Thomas from season 2 of Bad Girls Club has hosted from season 2 onwards.

== Series overview ==
| Season | Episodes | Originally released | | Winners |
| Season | Episodes | First released | Last released | Winners |
|---|---|---|---|---|
| 1 | 8 | March 16, 2010 | May 4, 2010 | Sarah Michaels & Nick Christensen |
| 2 | 8 | April 18, 2011 | June 13, 2011 | Lea Beaulieu & Robert Riva |
| 3 | 8 | December 5, 2011 | January 23, 2012 | Judi Jai & Matthew Goodman |
| 4 | 9 | November 5, 2012 | January 15, 2013 | Amy Cieslowski & Joey Paggi |

== Format ==
Alumni from previous seasons of Bad Girls Club are "looking for the man of their dreams." It takes place in one of the original "Bad Girl" houses used to film previous seasons. Three "bad girls" have a choice of several bachelors to explore love, friendships, etc. Each week features a variety of challenges and group dates. As the season goes on, the dates become more solo while the girls "pick the man of their dreams."

In season 1, thirteen bachelors compete for the love of three "bad girls." They competed in a series of challenges to be deemed "trophy winner." As "trophy winner," the bachelor could pick dates, have invulnerability from elimination, alone time with a "bad girl," etc. Elimination took place at the "Bad Girls VIP Room" at a local club. During elimination, all three "bad girls" choose one bachelor each that they think to be reckless, lack of interest, etc. The bachelors would "sell" themselves to the "bad girls" on why they should remain in the competition. The "bad girls" then deliberate and pick which bachelor to go.

Introduced in season 2, bad girls compete to be "HBIC (Head Bad Girl in Charge)." The "HBIC" puts the bachelors up for eliminations and picks the dates of the other girls. The other two "bad girls" have to vote on which bachelor leaves. If there is no agreement, the "HBIC" gets to pick which bachelor is eliminated.

Amy Introcaso-Davis, former vice president of Oxygen, stated, "Over the successful run of the Bad Girls Club series, the show’s die-hard fan base has demonstrated an insatiable interest in the dating lives of these flirty and outrageously energetic girls. Love Games gives our avid viewers the opportunity to watch their favorite "Bad Girls " find love in a fun and wildly entertaining way."
