= Ginger Zee =

American meteorologist and television personality

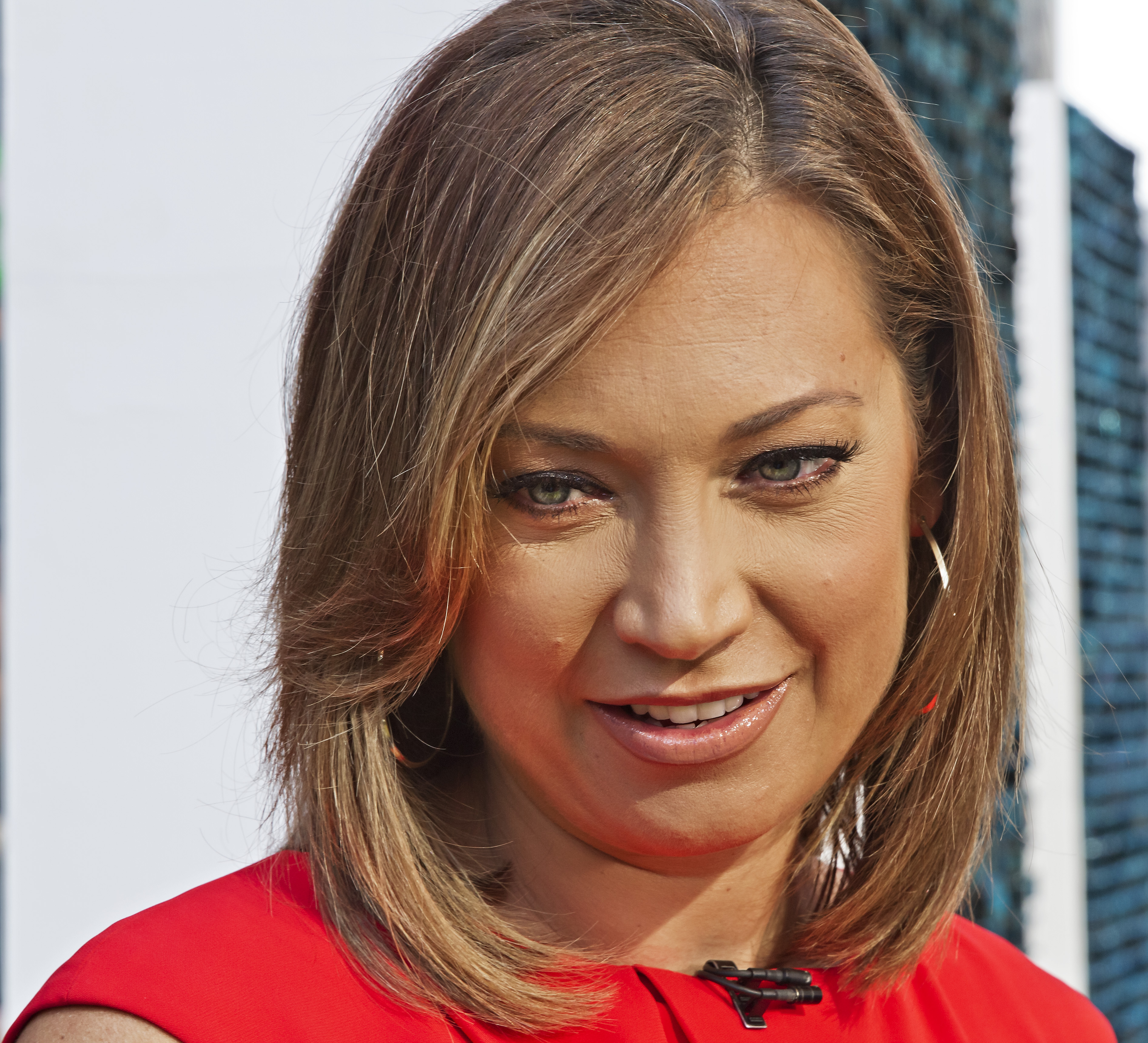
- Zee in 2015
- Born: Ginger Renée Zuidgeest; January 13, 1981 (age 45); Orange, California, U.S.
- Other name: Ginger Colonomos
- Education: Valparaiso University (B.S.)
- Years active: 2004–present
- Known for: Broadcast meteorologist
- Spouse: Ben Aaron (m. 2014)
- Children: 2

Ginger Renée Colonomos (née Zuidgeest; born January 13, 1981), known by her pseudonym Ginger Zee, is an American television personality. She is the chief meteorologist for ABC News, after having been the network's weekend meteorologist.

== Early life and education ==
Zee was born Ginger Renee Zuidgeest on January 13, 1981, in Orange, California, the daughter of Dawn Zuidgeest-Craft and Robert Zuidgeest. The family moved to Michigan before she was 1 year old. Zee was named after "Ginger" from Gilligan's Island by her Dutch father, due to his love of the show.

In her extended family, Zee has a stepfather named Carl Craft, and two half-sisters, Adrianna and Elaina Craft. Zee's paternal grandparents are Adriaan Cornelis "Adrian" or "Arie" Zuidgeest and Hillegonda "Hilda" Zuidgeest (née VanderShoor), who both immigrated to the United States from the Netherlands. Zee's maternal grandfather is George Joseph Hemleb and grandmother Paula Adeline Wesner.

Zee said she chose to be a meteorologist because "I saw a waterspout on Lake Michigan when I was eight... I was mesmerized. I really thought it was the coolest thing I had ever seen." In 1999, Zee graduated from Rockford High School in Rockford, Michigan. After that, Zee went on to Valparaiso University, where she obtained a Bachelor of Science degree in meteorology as well as a major in both mathematics and Spanish. Her goal at graduation was to be a meteorologist on The Today Show by age 30.

== Career ==
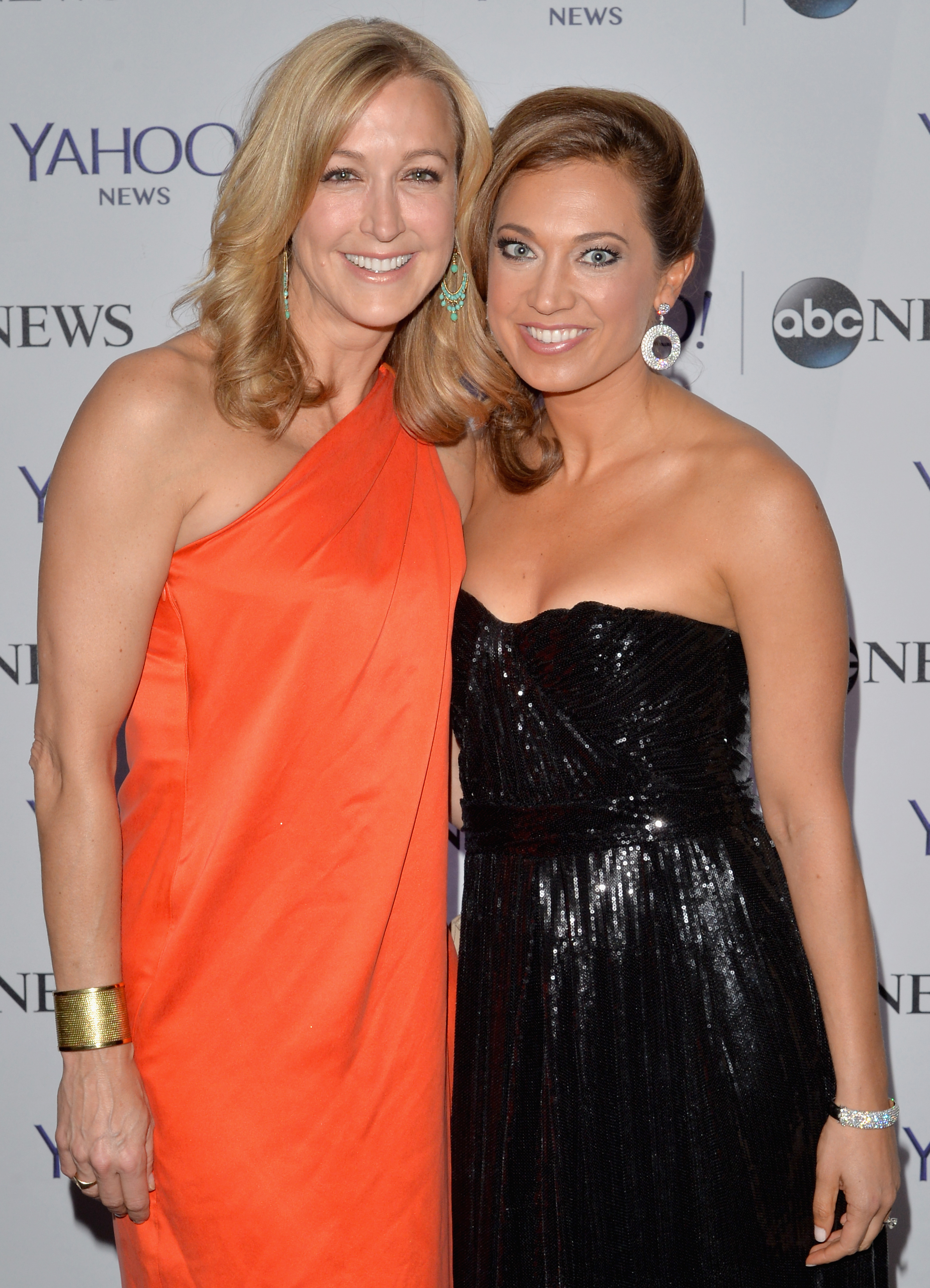
Lara Spencer (left) and Zee at the 2014 Pre-White House Correspondents' Dinner Reception Pre-Party

After graduating from college, Zee worked for various media outlets such as WEYI-TV in Clio, Michigan, WYIN-TV in Merrillville, Indiana, WLAV-FM and WOOD-TV both in Grand Rapids, Michigan, WBMA-LD ABC 33/40 in Birmingham, Alabama as an intern under chief meteorologist James Spann, and WMAQ in Chicago, Illinois, an NBC owned and operated station. While working at WMAQ from 2006-2011, Zee was once asked to fill in as a guest meteorologist on the weekend edition of The Today Show, and this fulfilled her high school goal. In addition, Zee is an AMS Certified Broadcast Meteorologist.

Zee reached national prominence when she joined Good Morning America Weekend on November 12, 2011. Zee occasionally appears on other ABC programming such as Nightline and ABC World News Tonight.

On December 2, 2013, ABC News announced that Zee would become Chief Meteorologist for Good Morning America and weather editor for ABC News, succeeding Sam Champion, who took a job with The Weather Channel.

In 2015, she competed in an episode of Celebrity Jeopardy! against Bellamy Young, who won, and Josh Gad.

On March 4, 2016, Zee was announced as a celebrity competitor on the 22nd season of ABC's Dancing with the Stars. She was paired with professional dancer Valentin Chmerkovskiy. The couple finished in third place behind Paige VanZant in second and Nyle DiMarco in first.

== Personal life ==
At age 21, Zee was diagnosed with narcolepsy. In August 2013, Zee became engaged to WNBC personality Benjamin Aaron Colonomos, known as Ben Aaron. The couple wed on June 7, 2014. Their first child together, a son, was born in December 2015 in Petoskey, Michigan. On August 14, 2017, she announced on Good Morning America she was pregnant with her second child. In February 2018, she gave birth to another son. The family lives in Rockland County, New York.

== See also ==
- Broadcast journalism
- New Yorkers in journalism
