= Pickler & Ben =

- Genre: Talk show
- Presented by: Kellie Pickler; Ben Aaron
- Country of origin: United States
- Original language: English
- No. of seasons: 2
- No. of episodes: 261

Production
- Production locations: Skyway Studios; Nashville, Tennessee
- Running time: 60 min. with advertising
- Production companies: E. W. Scripps Company; Happy Street Entertainment; Sandbox Entertainment

Original release
- Network: Syndication
- Release: September 18, 2017 – May 22, 2019

Pickler & Ben is an American syndicated daytime talk show hosted by country singer Kellie Pickler and media personality Ben Aaron, focusing on lifestyle, beauty, celebrity and advertorial segments, along with the subjects of human interest stories. The series premiered on September 18, 2017. The series also had a "shop the show" advertorial segments tying into merchandise featured by cable shopping network HSN and its website. In March 2019, it was announced that Pickler & Ben was canceled after two seasons. The final episode aired on May 22, 2019.

== Production ==
Pickler & Ben launched on September 18, 2017, being exclusive in that season to the stations of the producing television station group E. W. Scripps Company, along with a late night cable replay on CMT for nationwide coverage of the series. The show is recorded in Nashville and hosted by Scripps' CBS affiliate WTVF, and is recorded with a live audience at Skyway Studios, the former north Nashville studio facility of the Christian Broadcasting Network. Multiple episodes are taped throughout a period of days each month, with Ben Aaron flying into Nashville from his New York home.

On January 16, 2018, it was announced that Pickler & Ben was renewed for season 2. The renewal came with much-wider distribution, as Disney–ABC Domestic Television now distributes the series to a wider base of affiliates outside of Scripps, including ABC's large-market base of O&O stations (with CMT not carrying it in subsequent seasons). Season 2 premiered on September 17, 2018.

On March 1, 2019, it was announced that the show would not be picked up for a third season and, thus, ended its run in May 2019, mainly due to potential time slots being blocked out in major markets by ABC O&O stations and NBC Owned Television Stations for new talk shows hosted by Tamron Hall and Kelly Clarkson, including New York, Los Angeles, Chicago, Philadelphia, Dallas-Fort Worth and others; this would have left Pickler & Ben in undesirable late night slots in the future. Aaron is now a featured reporter for WPIX and their morning newscasts.

Repeats of Pickler & Ben aired until February 2020 on the Live Well Network, a digital subchannel network on ABC's owned-and-operated stations, after which it was converted to a new concept, Localish.
