= Ben Aaron =

American media personality (born 1981)

- Born: Benjamin Aron Colonomos; September 10, 1981 (age 45); New York, U.S.
- Education: Emerson College
- Years active: 1999 – present
- Known for: Co-host for Crazy Talk and Pickler & Ben
- Spouse: Ginger Zee (m. 2014)
- Children: 2

Benjamin Aron Colonomos (born September 10, 1981), known professionally as Ben Aaron, is an American media personality, based in New York City, United States. At the start of 2020, he became a features reporter for the PIX11 Morning News on WPIX-TV in New York.

He was formerly with NBCUniversal's LXTV and WNBC's New York Live, and the nationally syndicated Crazy Talk television series. From 2017 to 2019, he co-hosted the nationally syndicated television talk show Pickler & Ben with country artist Kellie Pickler.

== Early life and education ==
Benjamin Aron Colonomos was born on September 10, 1981, in New York to Janis Yudelson Salerno and Mark Colonomos of Jewish heritage. He grew up in Piermont, New York, and graduated from Emerson College, in Boston, Massachusetts.

== Career ==
Aaron started his journalism career on radio in 1999 at 18 years old working for Radio Disney. After a brief period hosting a radio show in Tucson, Arizona, he moved to Los Angeles and obtained an on-air television hosting job for Daybreak OC, an Orange County-based morning lifestyle/news show serving all of Los Angeles. From there he went to KSWB in San Diego continuing his work as a features reporter until WNBC in New York hired him. He worked for NBCUniversal at WNBC as its host of New York Live. There, he received three consecutive Emmy Awards for "Best Features Reporter".

He was a co-host of the nationally syndicated television program, Crazy Talk as well as being a correspondent for Extra.

In September 2017, Aaron began co-hosting Pickler & Ben, a syndicated talk show, with country star Kellie Pickler, produced in Nashville, Tennessee. After that talk show's cancellation in summer 2019, he returned to New York City, working for WPIX-TV as a morning features reporter beginning at the start of 2020.

== Personal life ==
In August 2013, Aaron became engaged to ABC News chief meteorologist Ginger Zee. The couple wed on June 7, 2014. Their son, Adrian Benjamin Colonomos, was born in December 2015. in Petoskey, Michigan. On August 14, 2017, Zee announced on Good Morning America that she was pregnant with the couple's second child. On February 9, 2018, she gave birth to a boy, named Miles Macklin. The family lives in Rockland County, New York.

== See also ==
- List of Emerson College people
- List of Jewish-American journalists
- List of people from Manhattan
- New Yorkers in journalism
