= Bad Girls Club season 2 =

Bad Girls Club
- Season 2
- The original seven "bad girls" of season two: Jennavecia, Darlen, Lyric, Cordelia, Neveen, Tanisha, and Hanna (from left to right)
- No. of episodes: 24

Release
- Original network: Oxygen
- Original release: December 4, 2007 – May 20, 2008

Season chronology
- ← Previous; Season 1 Next → Season 3

The second season of Bad Girls Club premiered on December 4, 2007, on Oxygen. Production of the season began in June 2007, and was located in Los Angeles, California. This season was the last to air 30 minute episodes, and its reunion is hosted by Star Jones. Season 2 is also the first Oxygen original series to ever break the one million viewer mark.

== Cast ==
The season began with seven original bad girls, of which one left voluntarily and one was removed by production. One replacement bad girl was introduced in their absences later in the season.

Name	Age (Note: Age at time of filming)	Hometown	Replaced
Sarah "Cordelia" Carlisle	22	Wallingford, Connecticut	—N/a
Darlen Escobar	24	Austin, Texas	—N/a
Hanna Thompson	22	Brooklyn, New York	—N/a
Jennavecia Russo	26	Las Vegas, Nevada	—N/a
Melissa "Lyric" Greene	22	Phoenix, Arizona	—N/a
Neveen Ismail	24	Portland, Oregon	—N/a
Tanisha Thomas	21	Flatbush, New York	—N/a
Andrea Sharples	22	Portland, Oregon	Melissa

=== Duration of Cast ===
Bad Girl	Episodes																						
Bad Girl	1	2	3	4	5	6	7	8	9	10	11	12	13	14	15	16	17	18	19	20	21	22	23
Cordelia	Featured																						
Darlen	Featured																						
Hanna	Featured																						
Neveen	Featured																						
Tanisha	Featured																						
Andrea													Entered (Note: Andrea replaced Lyric.)	Featured							Left (Note: Andrea left the house voluntarily after a heated altercation with Tanisha, Hanna and Neveen and multiple arguments with Cordelia.)		
Jennavecia	Featured													removed (Note: Jennavecia was forced to leave the house by production after quitting a mandatory job that was assigned to her.)									
Melissa	Featured							Left (Note: Melissa left the house voluntarily for feeling her roommates' negative behavior was affecting her badly.)															

== Episodes ==
No. overall	No. in season	Title	Original release date	Prod. code
23	1	"Bad Company"	December 4, 2007	201
Lyric, Hannah, Cordelia, Tanisha, Neveen, Jennavecia, and Darlen are the newest girls to join the Bad Girls Club. Cordelia quickly breaks down when Darlen says a false remark of her past life which leads Tanisha to defend her.
24	2	"Battle Lines"	December 11, 2007	202
Darlen and Jennavecia start trouble with Tanisha and Cordelia. Lyric tries to boost her music career.
25	3	"Spilled Milk"	December 18, 2007	203
The girls try to get along but two bad girls start to argue. Neveen starts making comments about Cordelia's past which leads Neveen throwing a gallon of milk on Darlen.
26	4	"Music and Lyric"	January 1, 2008	204
Lyric proves to the girls that she is on her own and doesn't need friends. Tanisha and Cordelia become enemies and Darlen and Neveen makeup. Lyric tries to start her music career.
27	5	"Pop Off!"	January 8, 2008	205
Tanisha continually puts Cordelia down, but things become more tense when Cordelia regains her confidence.
28	6	"Prank Wars Part 1: Party Girls Strike Back"	January 15, 2008	206
A battle rages as two household groups, the Hyenas and the Party Girls, start playing pranks on each other. Meanwhile, Cordelia's flirting with another man are causing issues with her fiancé.
29	7	"Prank Wars Part 2: Mark Your Territory"	January 22, 2008	207
After discovering that the other girls took apart "Clay Boy," Tanisha decides to fight in the Prank War back along with Neveen and Hanna.
30	8	"Prank Wars Part 3: Phat Lady"	January 29, 2008	208
Tanisha decides to take over the house and show the real her which bothers Lyric. Tanisha and Lyric get into a heated argument and Jennavecia tries to mess with Tanisha. Meanwhile, Lyric decides to leave the house. Note: Melissa voluntarily leaves the house.
31	9	"Love Conquers All"	February 5, 2008	209
To help her cope with a shattered romance, Cordelia hits the bottle. Meanwhile, the other roommates offer support to Darlen as her drinking intensifies.
32	10	"Return of the Juice, Death of the Truce"	February 12, 2008	210
Tanisha and Jenna use pranks to climb their way to the top, which causes a huge brawl between the two. Darlen contemplates her status in the Party Girls after having received a sobriety award.
33	11	"Sucker Punched"	February 19, 2008	211
Tension erupts between Tanisha and Jennavecia, after Tanisha discovers that it was Jennavecia who put hot sauce in her juice, leading to a physical brawl.
34	12	"Taken for a Ride"	February 26, 2008	212
Tanisha and Jennavecia take responsibility for their actions. Meanwhile, Cordelia is fed up with Scott and worries that dumping Taylor was a mistake.
35	13	"Cordelia and the Chamber of Secrets"	March 4, 2008	213
Jennavecia fakes being sick to get out of going to a meeting with Craig. She quits her job. Cordelia misses her boyfriend and regrets her decision to break up with him. Meanwhile, new roommate Andrea arrives. Note: Andrea replaces Melissa.
36	14	"Bad Riddance"	March 11, 2008	214
Jennavecia quits her job and is forced leave the house. Cordelia emerges as the new leader of the Party Girls. Note: Jennavecia is forced to leave the house.
37	15	"With Friends Like These..."	March 18, 2008	215
An ex-roommate badmouths Cordelia to Scott and Cordelia is looking for someone to blame.
38	16	"Threesome and Then Some"	March 25, 2008	216
Cordelia and Andrea's friendship is taken to the next level when a male visitor arrives at the house. Meanwhile, the girls throw a lingerie bash.
39	17	"Disorderly Conduct"	April 1, 2008	217
Darlen grows jealous of Andrea's growing friendship with Cordelia. Meanwhile, Tanisha throws a slumber party in attempt to reunite the girls.
40	18	"The Ugly Drunkling"	April 8, 2008	218
Drunken Cordelia becomes an emotional wreck and vocalizes her deep-seated "ugly girl" complex. Cordelia tries to apologize to the girls for her sloppy behavior the past few days. Tensions continue to rise between Cordelia and Andrea, and Cordelia's past is revealed to the Hyenas, who use every opportunity to exploit it, forcing Cordelia to alienate the other girls. Andrea vents via an online blog that may come back to haunt her.
41	19	"Ghouls Gone Wild"	April 15, 2008	219
Darlen's frustration in the house is released on a club patron on the street. Meanwhile, Cordelia decides to stop drinking and seeks help from her housemates.
42	20	"Three's a Crowd"	April 22, 2008	220
Andrea's boyfriend Josh visits the house and repulses all the girls, especially jealous Cordelia. When one of the girls leaves her MySpace blog unattended, the stage is set for a colossal confrontation.
43	21	"Happy Trails"	April 29, 2008	221
Andrea gets upset after the other girls give her a hard time for what she wrote in her diary and decides to leave the house. Meanwhile, the girls go out to a bar and get in a bar fight and Tanisha gets arrested. Note: Andrea voluntarily leaves the house.
44	22	"Pimp Down"	May 6, 2008	222
Cordelia consoles Tanisha over the phone during Tanisha's time in jail. Meanwhile, When Tanisha arrives back from jail, and heated argument occurs between her and Neveen.
45	23	"All BAD Things Must Come to an End"	May 13, 2008	223
Tanisha is still angry with the other girls about her stay in jail. All 5 originals say a tearful good-bye at the airport.
46	24	"Unfinished Business"	May 20, 2008	224
Star Jones hosts the Bad Girls Club reunion this season. Jennavecia finally confronts Cordelia and the Hyenas, Andrea faces off with Darlen and Lyric returns to the stage and gets into a heated argument with Tanisha.
