= Bad Girls Club season 3 =

Bad Girls Club
- Season 3
- The original seven "bad girls" of season three. Whitney, Amber M., Kayla, Amber B., Ailea, Tiffany, and Sarah (from left to right)
- No. of episodes: 15

Release
- Original network: Oxygen
- Original release: December 2, 2008 – March 31, 2009

Season chronology
- ← Previous; Season 2 Next → Season 4

The third season of Bad Girls Club premiered on December 2, 2008, on Oxygen. It is the first season to expand from a half-hour to one-hour format. Production of the season began in June 2008, in Los Angeles, California. It was the first season to feature the girls taking a vacation.

At the time of its premiere, the third season was the network's highest-rated and most-watched season premiere ever. It acquired a 0.8 household rating, averaging 807,000 total viewers. Among viewers 18–49, it acquired 568,000 viewers. 405,000 viewers were women 18–49 and 337,000 were women 18–34. These ratings were later surpassed by future seasons.

== Cast ==
The season began with seven original bad girls. One left voluntarily, one was removed by production, and one was kicked out by another cast member. One replacement bad girl was introduced in their absences later in the season.

Name	Age (Note: Age at time of filming)	Hometown	Nickname	Replaced
Ailea Carr	21	Buford, Georgia	The Instigator	—N/a
Amber Buell	23	Pittsburgh, Pennsylvania	The Narcissist	—N/a
Amber "Cookie" Meade	25	Montevideo, Minnesota	The Firecracker	—N/a
Kayla "KC" Carter	23	Compton, California	The Loose Cannon	—N/a
Sarah Michaels	23	Milwaukee, Wisconsin	The Party Girl	—N/a
Tiffany Torrence-Davis	24	East Side, Illinois	The Warden	—N/a
Whitney Collings †	21	Lynnfield, Massachusetts	The Straight Shooter	—N/a
Ashley Weaver	21	Seattle, Washington	The Femme Fatale	Kayla

=== Duration of Cast ===
Bad Girl	Episodes												
Bad Girl	1	2	3	4	5	6	7	8	9	10	11	12	13
Amber B.	Featured												
Amber M.	Featured		Featured (Note: Amber M left voluntarily left the house to attend her friend's wedding in episode 3 and returned in episode 4.)		Featured								
Sarah	Featured												
Tiffany	Featured												
Ashley							Entered (Note: Ashley replaced Kayla.)	Featured					
Ailea	Featured											Kicked (Note: Ailea was kicked out of the house by Amber M after getting involved in the physical altercation with her and Whitney.)	
Whitney	Featured											removed (Note: Whitney was removed from the house after starting a physical altercation with Amber M.)	
Kayla	Featured				removed (Note: Kayla was removed from the house after starting a physical altercation with Amber M.)					Appeared (Note: Kayla made an appearance for a photoshoot with Oxygen.)			

== Episodes ==
No. overall	No. in season	Title	Original release date	Viewers (millions)
47	1	"Breaking and Entering"	December 2, 2008	0.807
The season begins with Sarah packing and arriving at the mansion. She cannot enter the mansion yet, because it appears to be locked so she has to wait outside. Amber B. arrives shortly after, and the two become close friends, having mutual interests. Whitney and Tiffany are the next to appear. Amber M. and Ailea arrive afterwards, and Kayla is the last to pull up. Since no one seems to have the key, the girls start looking for it all around the place, which quickly sets Amber B. in bad mood. She takes a stick and breaks a glass door at the back of the mansion. The gang enter the luxurious mansion in awe and everyone quickly spots their new bedrooms. Amber M. is a bit unsatisfied because no shoes fit her. Eventually, the girls head to a bar to celebrate their new home, but they get kicked out of several places for fighting with Kayla being the core of trouble. The next day, Amber M. accidentally offends Ailea who later instigates a huge scandal against Amber. She apologizes, and everything is forgiven for the first time. Not wanting any drama this time, the girls go out to dinner. There, strangers start making comments that upset Kayla. She quickly gets angry and throws a drink, which leads to her getting kicked out.
48	2	"I Got Your Backbone"	December 9, 2008	1.012
The episode continues from where the last one ended. Kayla, still mad about the situation, is standing outside of the restaurant and shouting, which embarrasses all girls and especially Tiffany, when Kayla calls her out for not having her back. The girls get home, where Kayla bursts into tears while explaining why she blew up. She also opens up about her tough childhood, but Tiffany and Whitney console and ensure her that they are true friends from now on. The next day, the separation in the house becomes somewhat defined: the Ambers set up 'The Amber Show', where they gossip about the girls in the confessional, especially Ailea. Sarah longs for men and she encourages the girls to go on speed dating. Ailea decides to go, but she is nervous as she has been dating online for a long time. While thinking of question for the event, Kayla and Ailea sit in the kitchen and Ailea tells Kayla that they might be talking about her, which quickly sets Kayla off. This all leads to a huge argument between her and Tiffany. Ailea is considered the cause of Kayla getting mad, so a meeting is held, where she explains herself. The girls go speed dating later. Almost everyone finds men for the evening, with Sarah being one of the exceptions which largely disappoints her.
49	3	"Boston Tea Party"	December 16, 2008	1.129
Amber M. has to leave the house temporarily to celebrate her friend's wedding in Minnesota. Sarah and Amber B. get into a little misunderstanding with a hook-up Sarah met which makes her reconsider their friendship. Amber B. hooks up a local, Greg, at a club, and later invites him into the house, which makes Sarah annoyed. Going out in the evening, Kayla irritates Whitney by making lesbian jokes. Whitney wants her to say sorry, but Kayla refuses. Getting mad, they clash in the kitchen and start throwing tableware at each other in rage, which destroys their friendship. Later, all girls head to a stripper club to earn money. Kayla is nervous so she starts drinking non-stop, leading to her fall unconscious. Tiffany sees her off to hospital, and the episode cuts off on the cliff-hanger. Note: Amber M. temporarily leaves the house.
50	4	"The Naked Truth"	January 6, 2009	0.862
Kayla returns from the hospital safe. She opens up about her previous relationship, which influenced her insecurity. Tiffany invites Marcus, her new hook-up, home. Later, Kevin, Ailea's online hook-up, invites all the girls to eat out, where the Ambers, who obviously disapprove of Kevin as he is too old for Ailea, make silly comments, which greatly upsets Ailea. Amber M. and Ailea have a conversation which sets Ailea in rage. Later on, Amber B. discovers that Greg lied to her and decides to break their relationship at a club. Meanwhile, Kayla's dress tears and she gets upset. Tiffany is tired of Kayla's constant complaints and scenes and shouts at her. The argument takes from the limo to the house when Tiffany heard Kayla and Amber B. talking, resulting in a quarrel. Note: Amber M. returns to the house.
51	5	"The Tipping Point"	January 13, 2009	1.314
The girls head to a lingerie shop to give away leaflets in underwear for money. Kayla is low on money so she wants to by any means earn as much as she can and she is buying extra underwear for a bonus. Amber M. decides to get the bonus herself so she pays more, depriving Kayla of it and upsetting her. In the evening, the girls go out. The Ambers get into an altercation with locals in a bathroom and tell the girls about it. This escalates into a huge street fight. Tiffany gets especially mad, and shouts at the enemies from the top of the limo. Embarrassed by her behavior later on, Tiffany vows to never act like that anymore. Influenced by the latest events, the girls want no more drama. Therefore, Whitney, Tiffany, Sarah and Ailea go to a bar to have fun, while the Ambers and Kayla go to a quiet restaurant. Drama doesn't let the latter move around, though, because Kayla refuses to give a lot of tips. Amber M. and Kayla argue and consequently fight in the car, making Amber B. pull over. The fight goes on outside, involving the girls even choking each other. At home, the girls start discussing the situation and all come to the agreement that Kayla should leave the house due to her starting the fight. So Kayla listens to the other girls and leaves the house. Note: Kayla voluntarily leaves the house.
52	6	"Popping In!"	January 20, 2009	1.207
After Kayla leaves, the Ambers become quite separated from the rest of the girls, and their actions only keep the fire alight. At a surfing event, Amber M. constantly flirts with the surf trainer, which ticks everyone else off. Later on, bored with the rest of the girls, the Ambers discover that Tanisha is currently in the city and they decide to prank the girls by making them believe that Tanisha is going to be the new roommate. They find Tanisha and wreck her radio program, introducing themselves and making her support their idea. Tanisha agrees and plays everything out just as the Ambers wanted, intimidating and confusing the rest of the girls. She revealed that it was just a prank then and left. Later on, the girls go out. There, Amber B. gets too drunk to even move, and Amber M. makes out with the surf trainer, which disgusts the girls. In the limo, Whitney and Amber M. get into a heated argument, which resulted in a fight between the two. Back home, the girls spot the new girl's portrait under a sheet. They tear it off and are shocked to see their future roommate's face.
53	7	"Who Is This B..."	January 27, 2009	1.333
The girls decide to make the newbie feel unwanted and destroy her portrait. The next day, the phone rings and the new girl, Ashley, warns Ailea that she will arriving in a few minutes. Whitney gets angry with her attitude. All the girls lock the doors not to let Ashley get inside. When she pulls up, she enters the house from the backyard. The girls decide not to be too talkative and Amber M. is the one to show Ashley her room and wardrobe. This way, Ashley quickly forms an alliance with both Ambers, while the rest of the girls still remain bitter. When going out, Ashley clearly stated that she wanted to be friends with everyone, but she and the rest didn't seem to come to a conclusion. To put off the tension, the girls decide to organize a gambling event, inviting croupiers with toy money and chips. Ashley gets influenced by the whole event and proposes that they go to Las Vegas the next day. Note: Ashley replaces Kayla.
54	8	"What Happens In Vegas...Airs on TV"	February 3, 2009	1.198
The girls take the cars and go to Las Vegas. When they arrive, they rush to their hotel only to see that there are not enough beds for the seven of them. Annoyed, the girls draw lots to determine who is going to sleep on the couch. Later, everyone goes to a strip performance, Australia's Thunder Down Under, and Ashley and Amber B. have fun on the stage. The girls stay for the afterparty and Ashley gets angry at Amber B. for "stealing" her stripper. Next, the Ambers decide to get married as prank, but it isn't appreciated much. Still, everyone goes to celebrate it a bit at a club. Ashley starts to merge in with the Fab 4, making it a Fab 5, because she feels like she has little in common with the Ambers. Later on, the girls are met at a club and are asked to make a cameo performance in a Fantasy show. They do not dance that well, but still receive ovations. On their last day in Vegas, the Ambers and the rest go to an actual chapel to get married, Vegas-style. They start acting silly and therefore are denied with their marriage. This makes everyone laugh and make fun of the whole wedding process.
55	9	"This Is NOT The Amber Show"	February 10, 2009	0.874
On the way back home, everyone including Ashley gets annoyed with the Ambers. The situation in the house gets tense. When the girls go out, Ashley doesn't find her purse and gets mad. Amber B. took her purse without letting her know, so Ashley lashes at her, which fuels the tension even more. Later, all the girls but Amber B. get sick, so she goes to buy them medicine. Because she is late, Sarah gets upset and blames it all on her, which results in scandal between the two. Meanwhile, Sarah gets closer with Noah and Ailea prefers Fazil to Kevin. Ashley gets to know that the Ambers had been gossiping about her, demolishing their friendship. At night, the girls go to a club to see the Steel Panthers, who invited the girls to their performance. In the midst of the performance, the Fab 5 get involved into a huge brawl in the crowd, getting kicked out eventually. Back at the house, the Fab 5 members decide to discover who was the center of all the gossips, and since Amber M. doesn't want to betray Amber B., the situation results in a huge confrontation.
56	10	"Ailea of the Storm"	February 24, 2009	1.201
The Fab 5 agree on not being nice to the Ambers anymore. Amber B.'s clothes get thrown on the roof and her shoes are set afloat on the pool, which makes her burst into tears. Later on, the girls have to attend the photoshoot for Oxygen. Kayla returns, and the Ambers are very happy to see her once again. The Fab 5 keep to themselves and dislike the way the Ambers are acting. Back home, the girls have a spiritual seance, which put all the drama off and relieves the stress in the house. Later on, Jesse Jane, a pornstar, invites the girls to her premiere movie. The girls get pleased and also stay for the after party. The other evening, Jessie Jane brought the girls a present for seeing her movie, sending them all to Cancun for a week. Note: Kayla makes an appearance.
57	11	"Make a Run For the Border"	March 3, 2009	1.230
The girls are packing up for Cancun and everyone is very excited. Upon arrival, they are treated with free shots and other means of fun. Amber B. gets mad, however, as Whitney spilled a drink on her expensive purse. Once again, misunderstanding rises between the girls, bringing the grudges up. The girls arrive in a hotel to receive their suite. It appears to be a two-storey, luxurious suite with a pool atop and a nice view on the city. The next day the Ambers go to explore the city, while the Fab 5 lie on the beach and meet locals. By dinner, the company gets back together and tension, once again, is brought up because Amber M. wants to make it clear why the girls dislike her and Amber B. so much, but no one is in the mood to talk about it. Whitney warns everyone that she will flip out if everyone goes on talking about the situation non-stop. Tiffany gets mad at Amber M. for trying to wreck their dinner and throws some harsh words and leaves with Sarah and Ashley. In the evening, all girls head to a bikini contest. Ashley and Sarah are willing to win, while Ailea and the Ambers only participate for fun. Sarah gets shocked when her and Ashley lose to a local girl. Tiffany also gets upset because the MC blamed her for throwing ice, which she did not do. Whitney tries to find the MC to apologize to Tiffany, but to no avail. The situation is only fueled when Amber M. is somewhere on the stage, unaware of the drama going on with the Fab 5, while Amber B. is avoiding them. Outside of the club, tensions reach the limit and Whitney, along with Ailea, start screaming at Amber M. and blaming her for the contest drama. Amber M. goes from confused to angry to furious in no time and screams back at Whitney, who threatens her before Amber M. takes off her shoe and yells that she will hit Whitney with it if she bothers them. Whitney charges in and grabs a screaming Amber M.'s hair. Ailea cheers her on and Tiffany's expression turns to horror at what is happening. Ashley and Sarah are on the fringe, not attacking Amber M. but not holding back Whitney, while Amber B. is shown taking care of a bigger priority than helping her friend: finding a shoe she lost while running around outside the club. The fight is worsened when Amber hits Tiffany, who was trying to help, and falls onto the ground, getting kicked by Ailea and Whitney.
58	12	"The Cookie Crumbles"	March 10, 2009	1.620
The fight is broken up and a shocked, injured Amber M. is taken back to the hotel and given her own room; Amber B. is horrified that she didn't help her friend or have any idea what happened, and forgets about her stupid shoe in order to rush over and stay by Amber M.'s side. The Fab 5 return home shortly after and look for Amber everywhere, as a delusional, enraged Whitney rewrites the history of the fight and smiles savagely as she tells everyone she's not done kicking Amber M.'s ass. Whitney waits by the door for Amber M., but finally gives up and goes to sleep. The Fab 5 talk about the fight at breakfast the next day: Ailea lies that she kicked Amber M. herself, which the video footage disproves, and the group cackles that maybe the show will let them send the Ambers home. Tiffany's sober, deflated comments make it clear she's the one part of her group who is aware they're going to pay a price for their actions. Amber M. gets some pain pills, she has some bruises but no broken bones, while the police appear that night to talk to Ailea about what went down. She throws Whitney under the bus, and in a separate interview Amber M. also ID's Whitney as her attacker, but also says she doesn't want Whitney to be jailed. The cops tells Whitney she should leave Cancun, but the producers show up before that and tell her that her actions mean she has to end her vacation and fly home, and leave the house, as she's being expelled from it. Whitney leaves, and the girls go out to supperlater on. Amber M. picks up on Sarah and Ashley's deliberate lack of support and leaves the table sobbing. Amber B. goes to be with her, and Tiffany breaks ranks by responding to Ailea's insults of Amber M. by telling her to shut up, and saying she's going to go help Amber M. They convince her to have a good time during the remaining time in Cancun. When the girls get back, a house meeting is held because Tiffany is done with Ailea's shitty attitude. Amber M. asks Ailea why she attacked her for no reason, and Ailea pathetically says that she has reasons but isn't willing to talk about them and would be happy to expand on why she did that later on. Ailea says in an interview her "apology" was insincere and in the meeting, Amber M. tells Ailea she's full of it and doesn't believe anything she says. Amber M. then tells Ailea to leave both the vacation and the show for good, and Ailea packs up her stuff and departs. Notes: Whitney is removed from the house. Ailea is kicked out of the house.
59	13	"This is the Amber Show"	March 17, 2009	1.009
The Amber's hosts a clip of unseen footages of the season.
60	14	"All's Well That Ends Bad"	March 24, 2009	1.446
The girls arrive at the mansion to find Whitney's wishes to all members of the Fab 5. The house feels empty and the girls look for something to do. Going out, Sarah lets out that she was unfaithful to Noah, which destroys their relationship. The next day, the remaining girls board a motor ship to celebrate their last day in the house. Everyone is getting along, dancing, taking pictures and having fun. Back at the house, Tiffany invites her brother to come. Amber M. wants to get to know him. When he comes, she falls asleep and lets him touch her. Later, when he is gone, professional chefs come into the house to cook exotic food as the last supper together. Amber M. comes up to Tiffany to say that she took her brother's actions offensively. Tiffany gets upset and then blows up at the supper because Amber M. cannot say correctly where he touched her. The supper is wrecked. The next day, Tiffany and Amber M. make up and forget all their grudges. Since it is the last day, the girls decide to destroy the house. They throw all their furniture into the pool, shatter a glass chandelier and spray paint on walls.
61	15	"Unresolved Issues"	March 31, 2009	1.570
All the eight girls of season three gather to discuss their behavior with the host, Perez Hilton. Amber M. states that it was difficult to stay the whole season and quickly gets into an argument with Tiffany, who doesn't believe that Amber knew what the show was about and went on it, all the while Ashley gets into an argument with the other Amber. Amber B. says that she is not going to assault anyone on the Reunion. The girls revisit the drama of the last days and Amber M. and Tiffany argue even more. Afterwards, Ailea and Whitney come up onto the stage and Amber M. and Whitney argue about the Ambers secluding themselves. The Cancun fight is brought up and Perez disagrees with the Fab 5 who think it wasn't that bad, as he specifically tells Ailea she's disgusting and her behavior made him sick. Perez asks the purpose of The Amber Show, and Amber M. reveals that it definitely wasn't made to make everyone else angry. Amber B. apologizes to Ailea for talking about Kevin badly. Kayla then comes up onto the stage and quickly gets into a heated argument with Ashley who found her comment to be racially insensitive, which leads to a screaming match and then even a fight between the two. Later on, Perez brings up all the dates the girls had had. Noah is ready to be back with Sarah and Greg revisits his and Amber B.'s relationship, confirming that they did have sex. The girls get to say last few words about what's going on with their lives right now and leave the stage. Tiffany and Amber M. share a hug to stay friends. Ailea stupidly goes over to get a hug from Perez, and he bluntly tells her that he meant everything he said about her, that he will not give her a hug, and for her to get away from him and stay away.
