= WEAU =

Television station in Eau Claire, Wisconsin

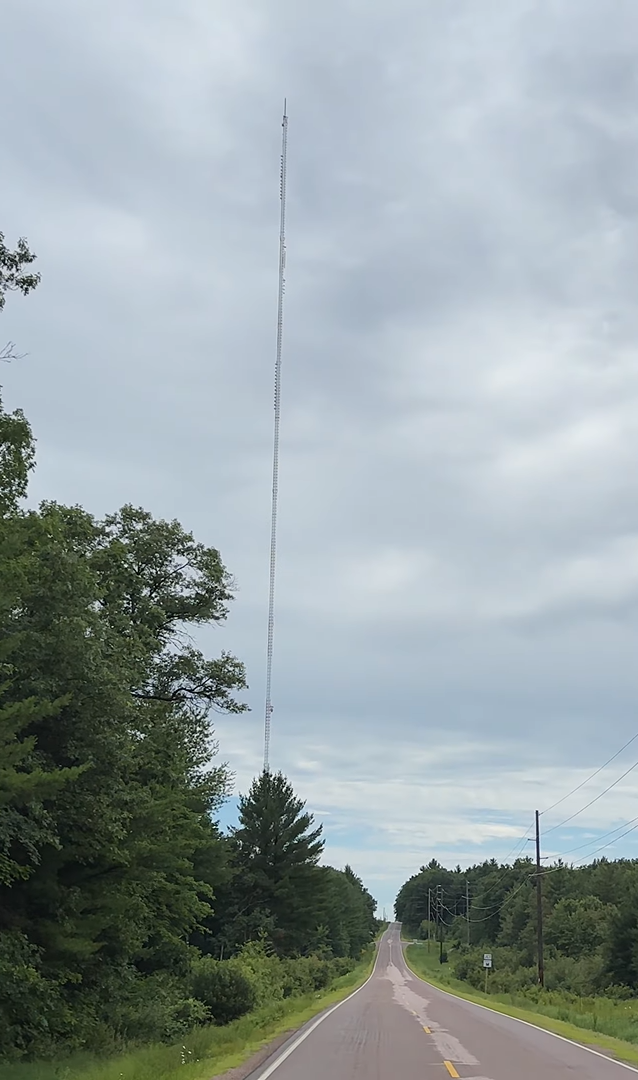
- The WEAU tower in Fairchild, Wisconsin, pictured in July 2024, from a distance of approximately 3,500 feet (1,100 m)
- Eau Claire–La Crosse, Wisconsin; United States
- City: Eau Claire, Wisconsin
- Channels: Digital: 17 (UHF); Virtual: 13
- Branding: WEAU 13; CW Eau Claire La Crosse (on 14.10)

Programming
- Affiliations: 13.1: NBC; 14.10: CW+; for others, see § Subchannels

Ownership
- Owner: Gray Media; (Gray Television Licensee, LLC)

History
- First air date: December 17, 1953
- Former call signs: WEAU-TV (1953–2012)
- Former channel numbers: Analog: 13 (VHF, 1953–2009); Digital: 39 (UHF, 2002–2009), 13 (VHF, 2009–2011), 38 (UHF, 2011–2020)
- Former affiliations: All secondary: DuMont (1954–1956); CBS (1954−c. 1958); ABC (1954−1970); NTA (1956–1961)
- Call sign meaning: Eau Claire

Technical information
- Licensing authority: FCC
- Facility ID: 7893
- ERP: 740 kW
- HAAT: 615.5 m (2,019 ft)
- Transmitter coordinates: 44°39′50″N 90°57′41″W
- Translator(s): see § Translators

Links
- Public license information: Public file; LMS
- Website: www.weau.com

WEAU (channel 13) is a television station licensed to Eau Claire, Wisconsin, United States, serving the La Crosse–Eau Claire market as an affiliate of NBC and The CW Plus. The station is owned by Gray Media, and maintains studios on South Hastings Way / US 53 Business in Altoona (with an Eau Claire postal address); its transmitter is located north of Fairchild, near the Eau Claire–Clark county line.

== History ==
WEAU-TV signed-on December 17, 1953, under the ownership of Central Broadcasting Company. This ownership group was led by Morgan Murphy Stations, the broadcasting division of the Evening Telegram Company of Superior, Wisconsin, and also included the Eau Claire Leader-Telegram along with WEAU radio (790 AM, now WEAQ at 1150 AM, and 94.1 FM, now WIAL). It has always been a primary NBC affiliate but initially carried programs from CBS, ABC, and DuMont. The station later lost DuMont following that network's shutdown in 1956, CBS when La Crosse and Eau Claire were mixed into one giant market in 1958 (with La Crosse's WKBT becoming the market's CBS affiliate), and ABC when WXOW (channel 19) signed on in 1970. During the late-1950s, the station was also briefly affiliated with the NTA Film Network. One of the first well-known personalities on WEAU was "Sheriff Bob" Dawson who hosted a children's show during the 1950s and 1960s.

The station initially broadcast from a tower immediately behind the WEAU studios on South Hastings Way in Eau Claire. A new tower, approximately 1,000 feet (300 m) tall, was built in the same location in 1956 44°39′50″N 90°57′41″W before an approximately 2,000-foot (610 m) tower was constructed near Fairchild in 1966. The tower in Eau Claire is now topped by the digital transmitter of rival ABC affiliate WQOW (channel 18).

Morgan Murphy sold off WEAU radio in 1959; in 1962, it sold WEAU-TV to The Post Corporation of Appleton (Morgan Murphy would later purchase rival WKBT, channel 8). WEAU's departure from radio proved short-lived as The Post Corporation purchased Chippewa Falls radio station WAXX (1150 AM) in 1963, and two years later, established a new WEAU-FM at 100.7 (moving to 104.5 when the Fairchild tower was built) which largely simulcasted WAXX's country music format. WEAU-FM's call letters were switched to WAXX-FM in 1977, and in 1978, the country format was moved exclusively to WAXX-FM with the AM station becoming WAYY (which later moved to 790 AM in a swap with WEAQ).

In 1984, Racine-born George N. Gillett Jr. purchased the Post Corporation stations, including WEAU-TV, making it a sister station to Milwaukee's WITI for a short time. WAXX and WAYY were spun off to Central Communications at the same time, and in 1985, the two radio stations moved out of the WEAU building to a new facility behind its parking lot. Despite being under separate ownership, WEAU continued to provide weather forecasting services for WAXX and WAYY as well as other stations purchased by Central Communications (which included WEAU's original radio properties, WEAQ and WIAL, in addition to WECL and WDRK) until December 31, 2001. WEAU resumed providing weather services to those same six stations, now under the ownership of Maverick Media, on September 11, 2006.

After Gillett bought Storer Communications in 1987, he had to sell off at least two stations to get under the then-FCC limit of 12 stations per owner. Later that year, he sold WEAU and four of his other smaller-market stations to Busse Broadcasting, headed by former WEAU general manager Lawrence Busse. Also included in the sale were KOLN in Lincoln, Nebraska (and satellite KGIN in Grand Island, Nebraska), WWMT in Kalamazoo, Michigan and KOKH-TV in Oklahoma City) In 1998, Gray Communications Systems (which was subsequently renamed Gray Television) and Cosmos Broadcasting (the broadcasting division of the Liberty Corporation which was later merged into Raycom Media and itself sold to Gray) teamed up to purchase the Busse stations with WEAU going to Cosmos and KOLN/KGIN going to Gray. Cosmos then traded WEAU back to Gray in exchange for WALB (Gray's original flagship station) in Albany, Georgia (that station returned to Gray in 2019 after WALB's last owner Raycom merged with Gray). Technology was the highlight of the following decade as WEAU-DT, which originally transmitted on channel 39, signed-on April 30, 2002, with the digital transmitter located at the top of the tower in Fairchild.

The station turned off its analog transmitter at 12:30 p.m. on February 16, 2009. At around 1 p.m., WEAU's digital signal relocated from channel 39 to channel 13. On October 1, 2012, WEAU dropped the "-TV" suffix from its call sign. The transmission tower for WEAU was the tallest structure in the state of Wisconsin topping out at 2,000 feet (610 m), or over 500 feet (150 m) taller than the Empire State Building. The tower was shared with former sister radio station WAXX. On March 22, 2011, this tower collapsed during an intense winter storm that brought a mixture of terrible weather conditions. A replacement tower was completed by December 15, 2011, and broadcasts resumed on UHF channel 38 in late December.

In 2024, WEAU and WECX-LD aired 10 Milwaukee Bucks games as part of an agreement with Weigel Broadcasting.

== News operation ==
WEAU tends to focus its local news coverage on Eau Claire and the Chippewa Valley, with a secondary emphasis on La Crosse.

WEAU constructed its own Doppler weather radar in 1979, becoming the first television station in the market to have its own device and no longer rely on delayed data from the National Weather Service. It premiered a 5 o'clock weeknight newscast on September 14, 1981. A satellite truck to provide live remote broadcasts came into use by 1983. The station was met with tragedy in September 1991 when weeknight news anchor Cindy Schott died unexpectedly. Her death was later the subject of a story on Real Life with Jane Pauley and Dateline NBC. WEAU resorted to a solo anchor format for the 6 and 10 p.m. news (John Froyd) following Schott's death but returned to a co-anchor format for their weeknight 10 o'clock program (Pat Kreitlow and Judy Clark) in August 1998 upon Froyd's retirement.

On August 28, 2006, WEAU entered into a news share agreement with Fox affiliates WLAX/WEUX (then owned by Grant Broadcasting System II). The arrangement resulted in those stations airing a weeknight prime time newscast produced by this NBC outlet. Known as Fox 25/48 News at 9, the half-hour broadcast would eventually be expanded to weekends starting January 20, 2007.

WLAX/WEUX features a majority of WEAU's on-air team except for maintaining a separate weeknight meteorologist and weekend news anchor (although they can fill in on the NBC outlet when needed). Fox 25/48 News at 9 originates from a secondary set at WEAU's studios and is fed to the WLAX/WEUX facility through a fiber-optic link. On August 5, 2011, WEAU upgraded its newscasts to high definition level. However, the WLAX/WEUX newscasts were not included in the change because they were produced from a secondary set that lacked HD cameras. As of fall 2015, Fox 25/48 News is broadcast in high definition.

=== Notable former on-air staff ===
- Craig Coshun – reporter/anchor (1988–1990)
- Pat Kreitlow – reporter/anchor (mid 1990s–2005)
- Cameron Sanders – reporter (1979–1980)

== Technical information ==
=== Subchannels ===
The station's digital signal is multiplexed:

Subchannels of WEAU
Subchannel	Res.	Short name	Programming
13.1	1080i	WEAUHD	NBC
13.2	480i	COZI	Cozi TV
13.3	480i	METV	MeTV
13.4	480i	MOVIES	Movies!
13.5	480i	IonPlus	Ion Plus
13.6	480i	OUTLAW	Outlaw
14.10	480i	WECXSD	The CW Plus (WECX-LD)

Simulcast of subchannels of another station

Subchannels of WECX-LD
Subchannel	Res.	Short name	Programming
14.1	720p	WECX-HD	The CW Plus
14.2	480i	HandI	Heroes & Icons
14.3	480i	StartTV	Start TV
14.4	480i	METV	MeTV
13.10	1080i	WEAU-HD	NBC (WEAU)

Simulcast of subchannels of another station

=== Translators ===
City of license	Callsign	Translating	Channel	ERP	HAAT	Facility ID	Transmitter coordinates
Eau Claire	WECX-LD		14	10.1 kW	474.9 m (1,558 ft)	185705	44°39′50″N 90°57′41″W
Eau Claire	W26FG-D	WEAU 13.1	26	0.1 kW	6 m (20 ft)	186476	44°48′0.0″N 91°27′57.0″W
Eau Claire	W33DH-D	WECX-LD	33	15 kW	123.5 m (405 ft)	184506	44°48′0.0″N 91°27′57.0″W
La Crosse	W34FC-D	WECX-LD	34	15 kW	327 m (1,073 ft)	35676	43°48′23″N 91°22′3″W

From July 2020 to September 13, 2021, WEAU was rebroadcast via a Digital Replacement Translator in the La Crosse area on RF channel 30.
