= WGNW =

Coordinates: 45.1227°N 91.4065°W

- Cornell, Wisconsin; United States
- Broadcast area: Eau Claire, Wisconsin
- Frequency: 99.9 MHz
- Branding: 99.9 The Family

Programming
- Format: Contemporary Christian Music

Ownership
- Owner: The Family Radio Network, Inc.

History
- First air date: August 2001
- Former call signs: WDRK (2001–2020)

Technical information
- Licensing authority: FCC
- Facility ID: 82292
- Class: C3
- ERP: 25,000 watts
- HAAT: 100 m (328 ft)

Links
- Public license information: Public file; LMS
- Webcast: Listen live

WGNW (99.9 FM) is a radio station serving the Eau Claire region of Wisconsin. The transmitter is located six miles northeast of Bloomer, Wisconsin.

== History ==
The station was initially licensed to Lawrence Busse as WDRK. Central Communications purchased the license from Busse in 2001. WDRK started with an 1980s music format when it signed on in mid-August 2001, then officially debuted itself on August 20, 2001, as "99.9 The Carp" with an active rock format.

WDRK and sister stations WAXX, WAYY, WIAL, WEAQ and WECL were sold to Maverick Media, LLC in 2003.

WDRK began broadcasting live 24 hours a day on the Internet in April 2006. The station's URL changed from 999thecarponline.com to thecarprocks.com in 2006.

The station switched to a Christmas music format on August 1, 2009. On August 4, 2009, the station became adult hits station "Bob 99.9".

WDRK and its Eau Claire sister stations, along with Maverick Media's stations in Rockford, Illinois, were sold to Mid-West Family Broadcasting for $15.5 million. The purchase of the Eau Claire stations was consummated on October 1, 2013, while the Rockford station purchases were consummated on June 1, 2014.

On June 29, 2016, WDRK began stunting with snippets of 1960s, 1970s and 1980s hits. Effective June 30, 2016, Mid-West Family Broadcasting consummated the donation of WDRK's broadcast license to Blugold Radio LLC. On July 1, 2016, the classic hits programming that had been on WDRK switched to WISM-FM upon that station's acquisition by Mid-West Family Broadcasting; simultaneously, Blugold Radio 99.9 FM was debuted on WDRK by Blugold Radio LLC.

On July 3, 2018, WDRK rebranded once again as "Converge Radio 99.9", while maintaining its indie rock format. The station's original rebranding was to be "Verge Radio 99.9" and while it had some positive feedback, they received critical comments as well. Its mission statement behind the rebranding is "to create and multiply personal, positive connections around music, the arts, and our community".

On December 8, 2020, WDRK went silent, in preparation for the closing of the station's sale and the format moving to another station. Effective December 11, 2020, Blugold Radio sold WDRK to Appleton, Wisconsin–based The Family Radio Network, Inc. for $280,300. The new owners simultaneously changed the station's call sign to WGNW. WGNW began broadcasting a contemporary Christian Music format on December 15, 2021.
