= KXPA =

American radio station in Bellevue, Washington

Coordinates: 47°35′29″N 122°10′56″W

- Bellevue, Washington; United States
- Broadcast area: Seattle metropolitan area
- Frequency: 1540 kHz
- Branding: Multicultural Radio Seattle

Programming
- Format: Brokered Time Ethnic (days and evenings); Adult Standards (late nights)

Ownership
- Owner: Multicultural Broadcasting; (Multicultural Radio Broadcasting Licensee, LLC)

History
- First air date: 1969 (as KFKF)
- Former call signs: KFKF (1969-1972); KBES (1972-1974); KZAM (1974-1981); KJZZ (1981-1984); KLSY (1984-1992); KBLV (1992-1997)

Technical information
- Licensing authority: FCC
- Facility ID: 11752
- Class: B
- Power: 5,000 watts

Links
- Public license information: Public file; LMS
- Webcast: Listen Live
- Website: KXPA.com

KXPA (1540 kHz) is a commercial AM radio station licensed to Bellevue, Washington, United States, serving the Seattle metropolitan area. It is part of the nationwide Multicultural Radio Broadcasting network, one of 30 stations owned by Arthur Liu, which cater to minority and immigrant communities with programs in their native languages.

The transmitter is located off 118th Avenue SE in Bellevue, near Kelsey Creek. KXPA is powered at 5,000 watts. But at night, to avoid interfering with other stations on 1540, KXPA uses a directional antenna, with much of the signal pointed west over Seattle and Puget Sound.

== Programming ==
KXPA airs brokered ethnic programming days and evenings, with adult standards from the "Music of Your Life" Network heard late nights. Clients buy blocks of time on KXPA and host shows in their native language, supported by advertisers targeting those communities.

Languages include Spanish, Russian, Mandarin and Vietnamese.

== History ==
During the early 1950s, the frequency was occupied by KGIB, located in Bremerton, which Operated with 1 kilowatt of power during daytime hours and owned by Kitsap GI Broadcasters Inc.

KXPA is derived from two radio stations. The AM 1540 station signed on the air in March 1964 as KBVU. It was owned by Birch Bay Broadcasting, powered at 1,000 watts. KBVU aired a jazz format, but went dark in 1967.

Another station in Bellevue, KFKF, had signed on the air in March 1958 at AM 1330. It was a 1,000-watt daytimer, required to go off the air at sunset. In 1969, Kemper Freeman, who owned KFKF, purchased the license for AM 1540 so he could move his station there and make it a round-the-clock operation. AM 1540 then became KFKF, a completely brand new radio station.

Stewart Ballinger bought KFKF in August 1972, switching the call sign to KBES, with a middle of the road (MOR) format. KBES was co-owned with 92.5 KFKF-FM (now KQMV). The two simulcast most of their programming.

In November 1974, when 92.5 FM flipped to progressive rock as KZAM-FM, the AM followed suit and became KZAM, still simulcasting. On May 19, 1978, after Sandusky Broadcasting bought the stations, KZAM adopted a "Rock of the ‘80s" new wave format, the first of its kind in the Seattle market. The FM continued to air album rock until July 1983, when it flipped to adult contemporary music.

Due to poor ratings, on February 23, 1981, KZAM went back to simulcasting the FM until July 15 of that year, when the AM became all-jazz KJZZ. On December 17, 1984, it became KLSY, with an automated hot adult contemporary sound. It became a complete simulcast of its FM sister a year later.

In January 1992, due to Sandusky's purchase of AM 880 KIXI, the Federal Communications Commission's ownership limits put Sandusky over the maximum number of stations in the Seattle area. KLSY was spun off to new owners and became KBLV, with a classic country format known as "Country Gold." KBLV formed a network by simulcasting with KJUN and KJUN-FM in Tacoma, KENU in Enumclaw, KTOL in Olympia, and KWYZ in Everett.

In early 1996, the Country Gold Network discontinued operations due to financial problems, with all stations being put up for sale. KBLV was sold to new owners and flipped to an Urban Adult Contemporary format that year. The format didn't last long. In late 1996, after the station was sold to Personal Achievement Radio, 1540 AM adopted an all-talk format, offering advice on business and life, from the "Motivation Talk Network." The station took the KXPA call letters on January 31, 1997.

It was later sold, and flipped first to the "Z-Spanish" radio network. In October 2000, it was sold to Arthur Liu, for its current multicultural format.

== See also ==
- KQMV
