= WMEQ =

WMEQ may refer to:

- WMEQ (AM), a radio station (880 AM) licensed to Menomonie, Wisconsin, United States
- WMEQ-FM, a radio station (92.1 FM) licensed to Menomonie, Wisconsin, United States
