= WBIZ =

WBIZ may refer to:

- WBIZ (AM), a radio station (1400 AM) licensed to Eau Claire, Wisconsin, United States
- WBIZ-FM, a radio station (100.7 FM) licensed to Eau Claire, Wisconsin, United States
