= KQMV =

Radio station in Bellevue–Seattle, Washington, United States

Coordinates: 47°30′17″N 121°58′09″W

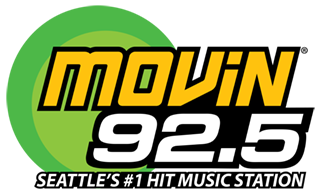
- Bellevue, Washington; United States
- Broadcast area: Seattle-Tacoma-Puget Sound
- Frequency: 92.5 MHz (HD Radio)
- Branding: Movin' 92-5

Programming
- Format: Contemporary hit radio; HD-3: Saigon Radio (Vietnamese)
- Affiliations: Premiere Networks

Ownership
- Owner: Hubbard Broadcasting; (Seattle FCC License Sub, LLC)
- Sister stations: KPNW-FM, KRWM, KIXI, KKNW

History
- First air date: November 20, 1961
- Former call signs: KZAM (1961–1966); KFKF-FM (1966–1972); KBES-FM (1972–1974); KZAM (1974–1975); KZAM-FM (1975–1983); KLSY (1983–2006)
- Call sign meaning: MV from "Movin"

Technical information
- Licensing authority: FCC
- Facility ID: 4630
- Class: C
- ERP: 56,800 watts 60,000 with beam tilt
- HAAT: 698 meters (2290 ft)

Links
- Public license information: Public file; LMS
- Webcast: Listen Live
- Website: movin925.com

KQMV (92.5 FM, "Movin' 92-5") is a commercial radio station licensed to Bellevue, Washington, and serving the Seattle-Tacoma-Puget Sound radio market. The Hubbard Broadcasting, Inc. outlet airs a contemporary hit radio radio format.

KQMV has an effective radiated power (ERP) of 56,800 watts (60,000 with beam tilt). The transmitter is located in Issaquah on Tiger Mountain. The studios and offices are located at Newport Corporate Center in Bellevue.

KQMV was the flagship station of the syndicated show "Brooke & Jubal in the Morning", hosted by Brooke Fox, Jubal Fresh, José Bolanos and Lydia Cruz. The show was later replaced by "Brooke & Jeffrey in the Morning", with Jeffrey Dubow taking the place of Fresh after he decided to leave the station. Jeffrey Dubow, Brooke Fox, Jose Bolanos and Alexis Fuller all host the show currently. The show is distributed by Premiere Networks.

== History ==
=== Urban KZAM (1961–1964) ===
KZAM began broadcasting on November 20, 1961. The Seattle-licensed station had an urban contemporary format, the first FM station in Seattle and the Pacific Northwest to target the African American community. It was owned by Monte Strohl's Foremost Broadcasting.

=== MOR KFKF-FM (1964–1974) ===
In January 1964, KZAM was placed into receivership; the month prior, it left the air. It was acquired by Bellevue Broadcasters, a limited partnership led by Kemper Freeman. Bellevue, which owned KFKF 1540 AM in that city, relocated the station facilities and license from Seattle to Bellevue in January 1966, and later that year, KZAM became KFKF-FM. The two stations simulcasted a middle of the road (MOR) format.

In August 1972, Freeman sold the stations to a partnership headed by Stewart Ballinger, with the station changing its call sign to KBES (reflecting the new licensee, Bellevue/Eastside Radio), but retaining the MOR format.

=== Progressive KZAM-FM (1974–1983) ===
92.5 flipped to progressive rock and became KZAM on December 16, 1974 (changing to KZAM-FM shortly thereafter), with the full format launching April 1, 1975. In May 1978, Sandusky Newspapers bought the stations (1540 AM would be sold in January 1992 to different owners due to Sandusky's acquisition of AM 880 KIXI from Sunbelt Communications). KZAM was also noteworthy for the number of women on its airstaff and its stronger-than-usual performance with women in the market. The decision to put women on the air was part of a deliberate effort to build a new audience counter-programming against then-dominant "high-testosterone" rock music stations. However, particularly after the Sandusky sale, the staff that had started the station began to leave.

=== KLSY Adult Contemporary (1983–2002) ===
KZAM flipped on July 18, 1983 to adult contemporary as "Classy" KLSY. The station saw its ratings increase, but it was challenged several times by other AC stations in the mid-1980s, and became the sister station of similarly formatted KRWM in 1996. From 1988 to December 2003, mornings on KLSY were hosted by Bruce Murdock, Tim Hunter and Alice Porter.

=== Adult Top 40 (2002–2006) ===
On February 1, 2002, at 9 a.m., the station altered its format to Adult Top 40 as "Mix 92.5" but retained the KLSY calls. In December 2003, the longtime morning team of Murdock, Hunter and Porter left the station; Mitch Elliot and Lisa Foster, who hosted afternoons, were moved to mornings.

=== Rhythmic AC (2006–2010) ===
On May 1, 2006, at 11 a.m., after playing "Closing Time" by Semisonic, KLSY began stunting with songs that had a "goodbye" or "farewell" theme, as well as playing slogans from various radio stations around the country (i.e. "The Best Songs of the 70s, 80s, 90s, and Today"). At noon, the station flipped to rhythmic AC as "MOViN 92.5", giving Seattle its first adult-targeted rhythmic station in four years since the demise of KBTB (now KJEB) in 2002. (This format also aired on KBKS from 1996–1997.) The first song as "MOViN" was The C+C Music Factory's "Gonna Make You Sweat (Everybody Dance Now)".

KQMV was the first station to use the "MOViN" branding, from the consultant firm Alan Burns & Associates. KLSY changed call letters to KQMV on May 8, 2006, to match the new branding. Unlike KBKS' AC-leaning direction and KBTB's Rhythmic oldies approach, KQMV featured a mix of rhythmic pop/dance currents, old-school hip hop and R&B, and disco and classic dance hits in a Top 40-like presentation, targeting females 25-44, and positioning itself to compete with rhythmic Top 40 KUBE and Mainstream Top 40 KBKS. Over the years, KQMV slowly dropped most disco tracks and began emphasizing more currents and old-school Hip Hop, R&B, and Dance tracks from artists like Prince, Destiny's Child, and Janet Jackson.

Beginning in September 2009, the station began tightening its playlist by dropping most old-school tracks, and shifted towards an adult-oriented rhythmic CHR format, though not moving all the way to Rhythmic AC, as it had been. The amount of currents was heavily increased, though the station did retain some old-school titles. As of November 18, 2010, KQMV completed its shift towards a conventional rhythmic contemporary direction, with emphasis on current rhythmic pop/R&B hits. As a result of this shift, KQMV was added to the Mediabase Rhythmic panel.

=== Top 40/CHR (2010–present) ===
As of November 2010, Mediabase added KQMV to the CHR panel, making it a rival to KBKS and KUBE. On the BDS overall Top 40/CHR panel, KQMV did not contribute its playlist to BDS' monitored chart until 2012 (it also contributes to the Dance/Mix Show Airplay chart) because of the station's rhythmic-heavy playlist. It initially avoided playing any Mainstream Pop/Rock crossovers to avoid overlapping with modern AC sister KLCK-FM.

Within three years, KQMV became the highest-rated CHR station in the market, and one of the top radio stations overall. KQMV's success with the format would cause changes at KBKS and KUBE in January 2016: KUBE would move its Rhythmic format to co-owned 104.9 FM, with KUBE's former frequency of 93.3 FM relaunching as Mainstream Top 40 "Power 93.3", while KBKS switched to a Hot AC format and retained the "Kiss FM" branding; however, in May 2018, the KUBE call letters and Rhythmic format returned to 93.3, while KBKS dropped Hot AC and returned to Top 40/CHR.

In July 2013, Sandusky announced it would sell its radio holdings in Seattle and Phoenix to Hubbard Broadcasting, based in St. Paul, Minnesota. The sale was completed that November. Hubbard's Seattle cluster now includes KQMV as well as KPNW-FM, KRWM, KIXI and KKNW.

== HD radio ==
- KQMV-HD1 carries the analog format ("MOViN 92.5") from the standard 92.5 FM frequency.
