= KGNW =

Coordinates: 47°26′00″N 122°28′02″W

- Burien, Washington; United States
- Broadcast area: Seattle metropolitan area
- Frequency: 820 kHz
- Branding: 820 AM The Word

Programming
- Format: Christian talk and teaching
- Network: SRN News

Ownership
- Owner: Salem Media Group; (Inspiration Media, Inc.)
- Sister stations: KKOL

History
- First air date: October 10, 1970 (as KQIN at 800)
- Former call signs: KQIN (1970 -1986)
- Former frequencies: 800 kHz (1970–1986)
- Call sign meaning: King (County) Northwest

Technical information
- Licensing authority: FCC
- Facility ID: 28819
- Class: B
- Power: 50,000 watts days 5,000 watts nights
- Translator: 104.1 K281CQ (Seattle)

Links
- Public license information: Public file; LMS
- Webcast: Listen Live
- Website: thewordseattle.com

KGNW (820 kHz) is a commercial AM radio station licensed to Burien, Washington, and serving the Seattle metropolitan area. It airs a Christian talk and teaching radio format and is owned by the Salem Media Group. The radio studios and offices are on 5th Avenue South in downtown Seattle.

By day, KGNW is powered at 50,000 watts, the maximum for commercial stations. But 820 AM is a clear channel frequency reserved for Class A WBAP Fort Worth. So to avoid interference, at night KGNW reduces power to 5,000 watts. It uses a directional antenna with a three-tower array at all times. The transmitter is off 105th Street SW on Vashon Island. The station is licensed to broadcast in the HD Radio format.

== Programming ==
KGNW airs a mix of local preachers and national Christian leaders. They include David Jeremiah, Chuck Swindoll, Jim Daly, Alistair Begg, Greg Laurie, John MacArthur, J. Vernon McGee and Charles Stanley. Two secular programs are also heard from Eric Metaxas and Jay Sekulow.

KGNW uses a brokered programming model. Hosts pay for their time on the station and may ask for donations to their ministries during their shows. National news is supplied by SRN News.

== History ==
=== 800 AM KQIN ===
The station signed on the air on October 10, 1970. Its original call sign was KQIN and it broadcast on 800 kHz. The station was a daytimer, required to go off the air at sunset. It was owned and operated by John Mowbray who also served as general manager.

KQIN played country music and competed with 1150 KAYO (now KKNW), 101.5 KETO (now KPLZ), and later KMPS-FM 94.1 (now KSWD). As more country music listeners switched to the FM band, KQIN changed to a Beautiful Music format in 1977. But that put it in competition with such FM easy listening stations as 94.1 KEUT (now KSWD), 98.9 KEZX (now KPNW-FM), 100.7 KSEA (now KKWF), and 103.7 KBRD (now KHTP). KQIN also aired Christian radio programs as well as old-time radio dramas and comedies. KQIN was sold in 1982 to All Pro Broadcasting owned by Willie Davis who was a former Hall of Fame Defensive Lineman of the Green Bay Packers. KQIN changed to an Adult Contemporary music format in 1983.

=== Move to 820 AM ===
On September 19, 1984, Salem Communications acquired 1150 AM in Seattle and changed its call letters to KGNW. Salem is the nation's largest owner of Christian radio stations and gave the 1150 station a Christian talk and teaching format. But that station does not have a very good signal.

In the mid-1980s, the Federal Communications Commission relaxed rules that restricted lesser-class stations on Class A, clear channel frequencies. Fort Worth and Seattle are separated by more than 2,000 miles (3,200 km). All Pro Broadcasting owned by former Hall of Fame Defensive Lineman Willie Davis applied to move KQIN to 820 AM and upgrade to 50,000 watts and 5000 watts at night, even though WBAP 820 Fort Worth is a Class A station powered at 50,000 watts.KQIN went 50,000 watts on December 1st 1985 and flipped to a local and live as a AAA and a mixture of R&B and Jazz. This only lasted a year when KQIN went bankrupt and went silent in December 1986 and All Pro Broadcasting sold the station to Salem Communications a couple weeks later and KGNW moved to the 820 AM dial position on January 1, 1987. The KGNW call letters and its Christian talk and teaching format were removed from 1150 AM and relocated to 820 AM. The move allowed KGNW to increase its daytime power to 50,000 watts and add nighttime power at 5,000 watts, using a directional antenna. Today, the KQIN call sign belongs to a PBS-affiliated television station owned by Iowa Public Television in Davenport, Iowa. The 1150 AM station in Seattle was sold to Hubbard Broadcasting and is now talk radio outlet KKNW.
