= KRWM =

Adult contemporary radio station in Bremerton, Washington

- Bremerton, Washington; United States
- Broadcast area: Seattle–Tacoma Metropolitan Area
- Frequency: 106.9 MHz (HD Radio)
- Branding: Warm 106.9

Programming
- Format: Adult contemporary
- Subchannels: HD2: Christmas music; HD3: Adult standards (KIXI simulcast)

Ownership
- Owner: Hubbard Broadcasting; (Seattle FCC License Sub, LLC)
- Sister stations: KIXI; KKNW; KPNW-FM; KQMV

History
- First air date: August 19, 1964
- Former call signs: KBRO-FM (1964–1979); KWWA (1979–1984); KHIT (1984–1986); KNUA (1986–1990); KKNW (1990–1992)
- Call sign meaning: Spelling of "warm" shuffled

Technical information
- Licensing authority: FCC
- Facility ID: 53870
- Class: C1
- ERP: 49,000 watts
- HAAT: 397 meters (1,302 ft)
- Transmitter coordinates: 47°32′39″N 122°06′29″W

Links
- Public license information: Public file; LMS
- Webcast: Listen live; HD2: Listen live
- Website: www.warm1069.com

KRWM (106.9 FM) is a commercial radio station licensed to Bremerton, Washington, serving the Seattle/Puget Sound region. It is owned by Hubbard Broadcasting, and plays adult contemporary music most of the year. From mid-November through the end of December, the station airs Christmas music.

KRWM broadcasts with 49,000 watts of effective radiated power (ERP) on a tower 1,302 feet (397 m) in height above average terrain (HAAT). Its transmitter is located near Issaquah on Cougar Mountain, with its studios and offices located at Newport Corporate Center in Bellevue. KRWM broadcasts in HD. Its HD-2 signal plays year-round Christmas music (the main station plays Christmas music as well from mid-November through Christmas Day), and its HD-3 signal simulcasts sister station KIXI.

== History ==
=== Top 40 (1964–1972) ===
On August 19, 1964, the station first signed on as KBRO-FM. It was the FM companion to AM station KBRO, owned by the Bremerton Broadcasting Company, and aired an automated Top 40 format, separate from the AM station. Its tower was only 86 feet (26 m) high, limiting its coverage to the area around Bremerton, not trying to market itself to the Seattle metropolitan area.

=== Country (1972–1984) ===
In 1972, KBRO-FM switched to country music. On July 4, 1984, it changed call letters to KWWA as Bremerton Broadcasting received permission from the Federal Communications Commission to boost its tower height to 1,380 feet (420 m), enough to cover the larger Seattle radio market.

=== Top 40 (1984–1987) ===
The station tried a second run at Top 40 music from July 4, 1984, to September 5, 1987, as KHIT.

=== New age (1987–1990) ===
In 1986, the station was acquired by the Pacific & Southern Corporation (a division of Gannett), which flipped it to a new-age music format the following year as KNUA, using the slogan "Music for a New Age."

=== Smooth jazz (1990–1992) ===
In August 1990, after Brown Broadcasting bought the station, it moved to a smooth jazz format as KKNW, calling itself "Sound FM".

=== Adult contemporary (1992–present) ===
On October 16, 1992, the station switched to a soft adult contemporary format as KRWM, calling itself "Warm 107."

As KRWM, the station competed against "95.7 K-Lite," KLTX, an established soft AC station. At first, it looked like Warm 107 did not have a promising future and was about to change formats, but when KLTX unexpectedly flipped formats in 1994, KRWM picked up most of KLTX's former listeners, and ratings increased dramatically. (KLTX is now KJEB-FM.) Sandusky Radio, owner of longtime rival KLSY, bought KRWM in September 1996, and would rebrand the station as "Warm 106.9". In the early 2000s, KRWM moved to a more mainstream adult contemporary direction, eliminating some of the softer artists and adding a bit more tempo.

In July 2013, Sandusky announced it would sell its radio holdings in Seattle and Phoenix, Arizona, to Hubbard Broadcasting. The sale was completed that November.

KRWM had been the flagship station of Delilah Rene's syndicated evening program for Premiere Networks. Delilah lives in the Seattle area and the show had been heard on KRWM before its nationwide rollout. In mid-July 2014, KRWM discontinued airing the show.
