= KDFL =

KDFL may refer to:

== Broadcasting ==
- KDFL, a radio station in Livermore, California, United States: see Classical California
- KFWY, a radio station in Sumner, Washington, United States, that used the call sign KDFL from 1965 to 1980
- KLAY, a radio station in Lakewood, Washington, United States, that used the call sign KDFL in 1990

== Sports ==
- Kampala and District Football League, a football league in Uganda
- Big Rivers Football League, a football league in the Northern Territory, Australia, formerly known as the Katherine District Football League
- Kyabram District Football Netball League, a football league in Victoria, Australia, formerly known as the Kyabram District Football League

== Other ==
- Düsseldorf-Flingern station (DS100 code: KDFL)
