= WISM-FM =

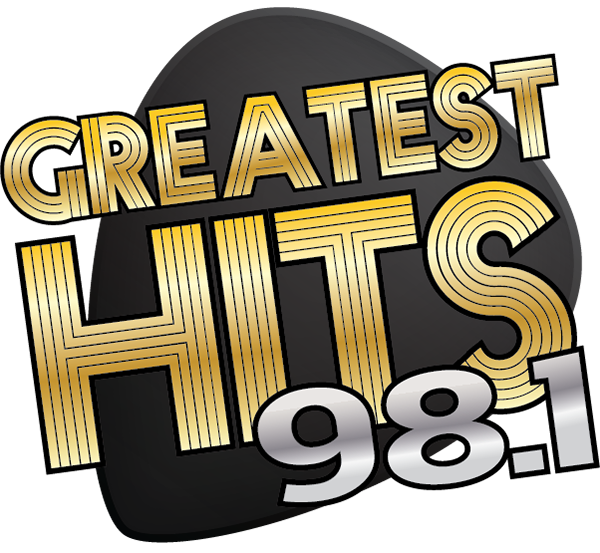
- Altoona, Wisconsin; United States
- Broadcast area: Eau Claire-Chippewa Falls
- Frequency: 98.1 MHz
- Branding: Greatest Hits 98.1

Programming
- Format: Classic hits

Ownership
- Owner: Mid-West Family Broadcasting; (Clear Water Brands, Inc.)
- Sister stations: WAXX; WAYY; WEAQ; WECL; WIAL

History
- First air date: November 1991
- Call sign meaning: Wisconsin Mid-West

Technical information
- Licensing authority: FCC
- Facility ID: 1130
- Class: C3
- ERP: 25,000 watts
- HAAT: 53 m (174 ft)
- Transmitter coordinates: 44°46′37.9″N 91°28′29.6″W

Links
- Public license information: Public file; LMS
- Webcast: Listen live
- Website: greatesthits981.com

WISM-FM (98.1 FM) is a radio station broadcasting a classic hits format. Licensed to Altoona, Wisconsin, United States, the station serves the Eau Claire-Chippewa Falls area. It is owned by Mid-West Family Broadcasting.

== History ==
The WISM-FM callsign was first used in 1959 in Madison, Wisconsin, at 98.1 FM. On December 1, 1983, WISM-FM changed its call sign to WMGN.

Eventually, the Federal Communications Commission (FCC) controlled and licensed station call lettered were acquired by Alpenglow Communications, which relaunched WISM-FM in November 1991 with a classic rock format.

The station was then bought by Clear Channel Broadcasting Licenses, Inc., but was then transferred to the Aloha Station Trust.

The station was sold again in 2016 to Mid-West Family Broadcasting for $970,000.

On July 1, 2016, coincident with the sale to Mid-West Family Broadcasting being consummated, WISM-FM changed its format from adult contemporary to classic hits, branded as "Greatest Hits 98.1". The specific programming was transferred from WDRK, upon that station's donation from Mid-West Family Broadcasting to Blugold Radio LLC.
