= KZIZ =

- Pacific, Washington; United States
- Broadcast area: Seattle-Tacoma, Washington
- Frequency: 1560 kHz
- Branding: Radio Punjab

Programming
- Format: South Asian

Ownership
- Owner: Charanjit Singh Batth; (Akal Media, Inc.)
- Sister stations: KKDZ

History
- First air date: January 1986
- Former call signs: KARP (1986); KFRS (1986–1990)
- Call sign meaning: Formerly one of the Z Twins stations

Technical information
- Licensing authority: FCC
- Facility ID: 35550
- Class: B
- Power: 5,000 watts (day); 3,300 watts (critical hours); 900 watts (night)
- Transmitter coordinates: 47°17′58″N 122°11′18″W

Links
- Public license information: Public file; LMS
- Website: radiopunjab.com

KZIZ (1560 AM) is a commercial radio station licensed to Pacific, Washington, United States, and serving the Seattle-Tacoma market. It carries a South Asian format known as "Radio Punjab", with affiliated stations in San Francisco, Sacramento and other West Coast markets. The station is owned by Charanjit Singh Batth, through licensee Akal Media, Inc, and has a transmitter sited in Auburn, Washington.

== Former radio station on this frequency ==
The 1560 kHz frequency in this area was previously occupied by a station licensed to Sumner known as KDFL from 1965 to 1980 and as KFWY from 1980 to 1982. The last ownership group of the station, headed by Andy Cratsenberg and featuring a series of notable local sports personalities, ran the station from nearby Federal Way. It last broadcast in May 1982.

== History ==
Lloyd Hannah had been an engineer for KFWY. After the Federal Communications Commission (FCC) canceled KFWY's license, Hannah applied for the frequency in March 1984. By January 1986, Hannah's station was on the air as KARP, airing religious programming. KARP changed call signs to KFRS on May 1, 1986. The station struggled to find advertisers and, under owner Don Shorter, moved its studios to Tacoma in 1988. By that time, a bankruptcy trustee had already been appointed.

In 1989, the trustee agreed to sell the station to KRIZ Broadcasting, The station became KZIZ, simulcasting the urban contemporary format of KRIZ. In 2001, it switched to urban contemporary gospel.

KZIZ flipped to smooth jazz on May 24, 2013. The move returned the smooth jazz format to analog radio in Seattle/Tacoma for the first time since KWJZ-FM's switch to KLCK-FM in December 2010.

Until 2016, KZIZ was one of three stations in the Puget Sound region that made up The Z Twins, serving the African American communities of King and Pierce County, Washington with a diverse R&B, black gospel music and talk format as well as Hispanic programming.

On March 6, 2016, KZIZ flipped to a South Asian format as "Radio Punjab". Effective June 7, 2016, XL Media Inc. acquired KZIZ for $680,000. Effective August 10, 2017, KZIZ's license was assigned to commonly-owned Akal Broadcasting Corporation, and then assigned to also commonly-owned Akal Media, Inc. effective October 24, 2019.

On July 20, 2016, KZIZ was granted a construction permit to increase day power to 10,000 watts, increase night power to 2,500 watts and decrease critical hours power to 2,500 watts. The transmitter was off 24th Street East in Sumner, Washington. In accordance with the construction permit the station has moved to share with KMIA at the Auburn site. At Sumner there is no more trace, even of the mounting blocks.
