= KFWY =

- Sumner, Washington; United States
- Frequency: 1560 kHz

Ownership
- Owner: Cratsenberg Development Company

History
- First air date: October 23, 1965
- Last air date: May 1982
- Former call signs: KDFL (1965–1980)

Technical information
- Power: 250 watts (daytime)

KFWY (1560 AM) was a radio station licensed to Sumner, Washington, United States. It operated from 1965 to 1980 as KDFL before changing call signs in 1980 after being sold to the Cratsenberg Development Company. Intending to operate the station from nearby Federal Way, Cratsenberg changed the call sign, but the station did not last long in its new location. KFWY was off the air by May 1982.

== History ==
Puyallup Valley Broadcasting Company, Inc., applied to the Federal Communications Commission (FCC) on September 15, 1964, seeking authority to build a new radio station in Sumner, Washington, on 1560 kHz with a daytime-only power of 250 watts. The commission granted the construction permit on May 10, 1965, and KDFL went on the air for the "Daffodil Valley" on October 23 of that year. Its owners had previously been associated with station KASY at Auburn.

In 1970, KDFL was sold to Valley Communications Corporation, and in 1976 it was sold to Puget Sound Broadcasting Corporation. At the time the sale was announced in February 1975, KDFL was airing music from the 1920s to 1940s. It went off the air that December for financial reasons. The new ownership was headed by William Crews, president of Grace Bible College in Albany, Georgia. Henry Perozzo of Tacoma continued to own the station's physical assets and lease them to Puget Sound Broadcasting. Perozzo had been associated with KUPY in Puyallup.

KDFL was sold to Southsound Communications effective February 1, 1980, and changed its call sign to KFWY on December 3 of that year. Southsound consisted of several local businessmen. A second sale in October 1980, apparently without FCC notification, saw control of Southsound pass to Andrew J. Cratsenberg, a developer. Cratsenberg tried to move the station to Federal Way, from where it began operating in late 1981. A number of notable sports figures were stockholders in the station in this incarnation, including sportscasters Don Poier and Bob Robertson, Seattle Mariners president Dan O'Brien, and former Mariners pitching coach Wes Stock and his son Jeff Stock. It operated through May 1982, when it went silent and its employees were dismissed. Lloyd Hannah, a Tacoma engineer who had done contract work for KFWY, sued for unpaid bills. Hannah believed the station lacked equipment to go on the air, and he had been contacted by FCC engineers as to the legal status of the facility. The FCC canceled KFWY's license, and Hannah applied for the frequency in March 1984.

By January 1986, Hannah's station was on the air as KARP, airing religious programming.
