= WMEQ-FM =

- Menomonie, Wisconsin; United States
- Broadcast area: Eau Claire–Chippewa Falls
- Frequency: 92.1 MHz
- Branding: Classic Rock 92.1

Programming
- Format: Classic rock
- Affiliations: Westwood One

Ownership
- Owner: iHeartMedia, Inc.; (iHM Licenses, LLC)
- Sister stations: WATQ, WBIZ, WBIZ-FM, WMEQ-AM, WQRB

History
- First air date: July 19, 1967 (as WDMW)
- Former call signs: WDMW (1967–1975); WMFM (1975–1978); WMEQ (1978–1989)
- Call sign meaning: Menominie's Q92 ("Q" is a common FM station brand)

Technical information
- Licensing authority: FCC
- Facility ID: 52473
- Class: C2
- ERP: 17,500 watts
- HAAT: 219 m (719 ft)
- Transmitter coordinates: 44°54′59.00″N 91°41′55.00″W

Links
- Public license information: Public file; LMS
- Webcast: Listen Live
- Website: rock921.iheart.com

WMEQ-FM (92.1 MHz, Classic Rock 92.1) is a radio station broadcasting a classic rock format. Licensed to Menomonie, Wisconsin, United States, the station serves the Eau Claire area. The station is owned by iHeartMedia, Inc. and carries the nationally syndicated radio program Bob & Tom.

== History ==
The station signed on the air on July 17, 1967, as WDMW featuring a primarily stereo simulcast to its AM radio station WMNE, but some of its programs were separated during its earlier years which featured beautiful music programs from the Triangle Program Service. Both WMNE and WDMW separated all of its programs apart in the early-1970s, and in 1975, WDMW changed its calls to WMFM. WMFM went under its branding "Stereo 92" and features a MOR music format.

In 1978, WMFM dropped its MOR format and flipped to a Top 40/CHR music format under the calls WMEQ and its longtime moniker branding "Q92", which would remain for more than a decade. Retaining its Q92 branding, its music format was downgraded to adult contemporary in 1988.

In September 1989, both WMNE and WMEQ attempted to swap formats due to major upgrades to both stations, but its format swap never happened. Instead, WMEQ retained its adult contemporary music format. In early 1991, WMEQ flipped to an oldies music format due to the January 1991 launch of then-adult contemporary station WECL-FM. In April 1994, its oldies format was upgraded to classic hits which focused on songs from the late-1960s to the early-1980s. Its current classic rock format was introduced in the early-2000s.
