= KKNW =

Talk radio station in Seattle

- Seattle, Washington; United States
- Broadcast area: Seattle metropolitan area
- Frequency: 1150 kHz
- Branding: 1150 AM and 98.9 HD2 The Bull Classics

Programming
- Format: Classic country

Ownership
- Owner: Hubbard Broadcasting, Inc.; (Seattle FCC License Sub, LLC)
- Sister stations: KQMV; KRWM; KPNW-FM; KIXI

History
- First air date: 1927
- Former call signs: KRSC (1927–1950); KAYO (1950–1982); KSPL (1982–1984); KGNW (1984–1986); KEZX (1987–1999); KSRB (1999–2001)
- Call sign meaning: "Northwest"

Technical information
- Licensing authority: FCC
- Facility ID: 57834
- Class: B
- Power: 10,000 watts (day); 6,000 watts (night)
- Transmitter coordinates: 47°35′11.4″N 122°11′14.4″W
- Repeater: 98.9 KPNW-FM HD2 (Seattle)

Links
- Public license information: Public file; LMS
- Webcast: Listen live

KKNW (1150 AM) is a commercial radio station licensed to serve Seattle, Washington, owned by Hubbard Broadcasting, Inc., carrying classic country originated by sister station KPNW-HD2 (98.9-2 FM) as a complement to KPNW-FM's contemporary country format, with the latter known as "The Bull" and KKNW known as "The Bull Classics".

KKNW's transmitter is in Mercer Slough Nature Park in Bellevue, and its studios are located in the Newport Corporate Center, also in Bellevue.

== History ==
KKNW first began in 1927 as KRSC, with the call sign standing for Kelvinator Radio Sales Corporation. Under the ownership of Jessica Longston, it became KAYO in 1953 and was a top 40 station from the late 1950s until 1961, when it changed to MOR.

It then went back to top 40 in 1962 before flipping to a long-running country music format in April 1963, and was a competitor to KMPS (now KKOL) and KQIN (now KGNW). In 1980, the station flipped to a news/talk format after it was sold to Obie Broadcasting. In 1982, the station flipped to adult contemporary and became known as KSPL. KSPL changed call letters to KGNW on September 19, 1984, and became a religious outlet under Salem Communications ownership. On December 31, 1986, KGNW moved to its current home at 820 AM, while 1150 AM was sold to Park Communications and began simulcasting the adult album alternative format of KEZX-FM (now KPNW-FM) as KEZX.

On April 20, 1987, KEZX dropped from the FM simulcast and flipped to new age and classical music, which would then give way to another simulcast with KEZX-FM on April 1, 1988. In 1989, KEZX flipped to "Business Radio 1150", which aired business talk programming. Sandusky Radio bought the station in 1996. On January 13, 1999, the station flipped to classic R&B as KSRB. The programming was predominantly satellite-fed through ABC Radio's The Touch Network.

On June 1, 2001, at 6 am, the station flipped to all-news as "NewsChannel 1150", and changed call letters to KKNW, which carried the audio portion of CNN Headline News. In the mid-2000s, the station shifted its programming to an "alternative talk" format, which eventually became a mix of brokered programming and liberal talk shows.

Previous logo

In July 2013, Sandusky announced it would sell its radio holdings in Seattle and Phoenix, Arizona, to Hubbard Broadcasting. The sale was completed that November.

On October 1, 2026, KKNW flipped to classic country as The Bull Classics; the format is a spin-off of sister station KPNW-FM, and is also simulcast by KPNW on an HD Radio subchannel.
