= Lake Altoona (Wisconsin) =

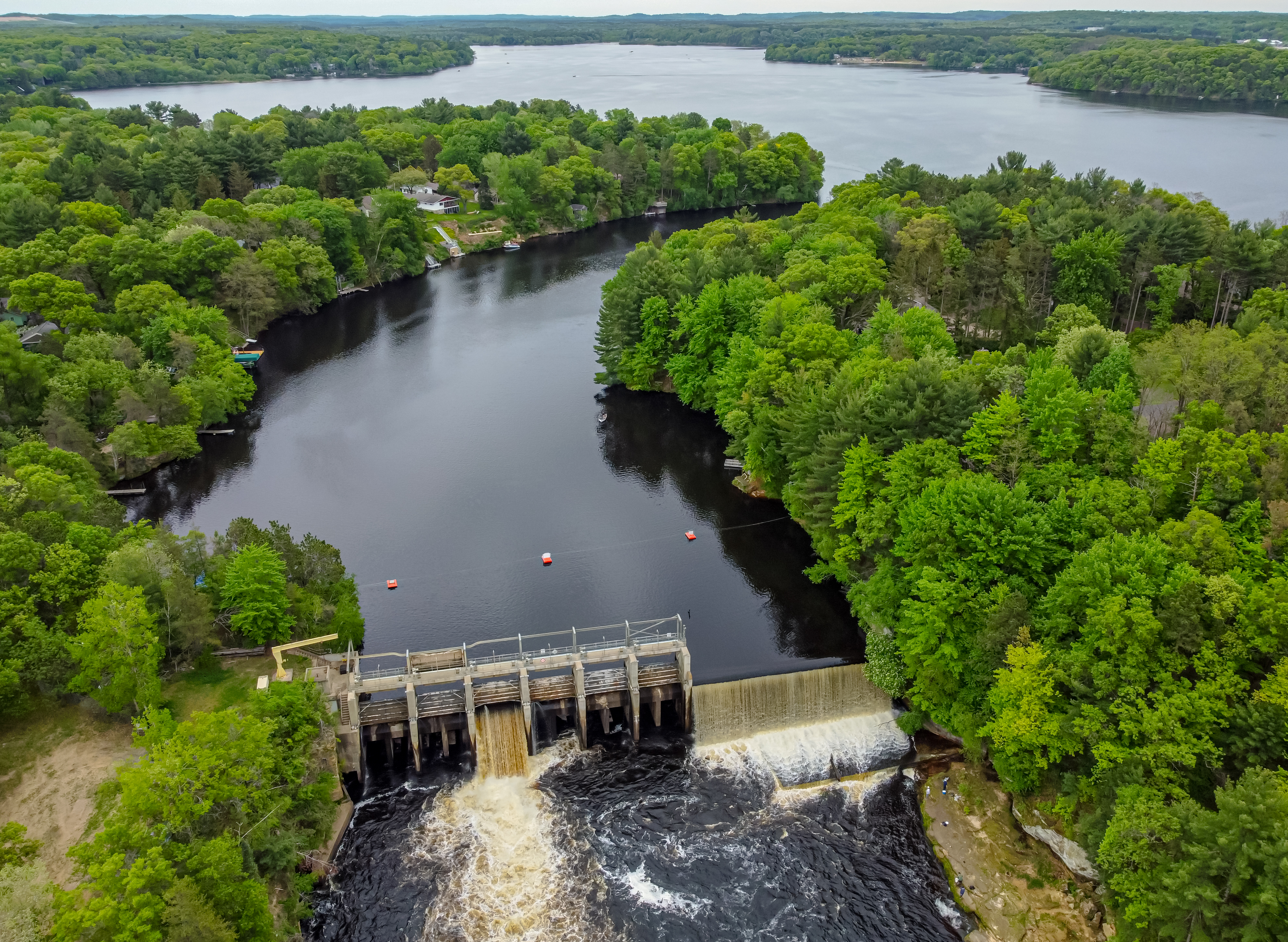

- Location within Wisconsin
- Location: Eau Claire County, Wisconsin
- Coordinates: 44°48′59″N 91°25′13″W
- Type: reservoir
- First flooded: 1938
- Surface area: 840 acres (340 ha)
- Max. depth: 25 ft (7.6 m)
- Surface elevation: 801 ft (244 m)

Lake Altoona is a man-made lake in Eau Claire County, Wisconsin, United States, bordering the city of Altoona, Wisconsin, and to the east of Eau Claire.

The lake was created by impounding the Eau Claire River with the construction of the Altoona 2WP340 Dam in 1938, with a concrete spillway and sluice gates on the western end of the reservoir. (The "2WP340" refers to the permit number of the Public Service Commission of Wisconsin authorizing the dam.) The dam is owned and operated by Eau Claire County for recreation and water conservation. No hydroelectric power is generated.

The lake has a surface area of 840 acres (340 ha), and is adjacent to Lake Altoona County Park with various recreational facilities. Altoona Lake is a 720 acres (290 ha) lake located in Eau Claire County. It has a maximum depth of 25 feet (7.6 m).
