= WQRB =

- Bloomer, Wisconsin; United States
- Broadcast area: Eau Claire–Chippewa Falls
- Frequency: 95.1 MHz
- RDS: Hot Country Eau Claire (formerly The Valley's Country Leader)
- Branding: Hot Country B95

Programming
- Format: Country
- Affiliations: Premiere Networks

Ownership
- Owner: iHeartMedia, Inc.; (iHM Licenses, LLC)
- Sister stations: WATQ, WBIZ, WBIZ-FM, WMEQ, WMEQ-FM

History
- Former call signs: WPHQ (1990–1992)
- Call sign meaning: W Q R B95

Technical information
- Licensing authority: FCC
- Facility ID: 5870
- Class: C3
- ERP: 8,900 watts
- HAAT: 166 m (545 ft)
- Transmitter coordinates: 44°55′44.00″N 91°32′31.00″W

Links
- Public license information: Public file; LMS
- Webcast: Listen Live
- Website: b95radio.com

WQRB (95.1 FM) is an American commercial radio station broadcasting a country music format. Licensed to Bloomer, Wisconsin, United States, the station serves the Eau Claire area. The station is owned by iHeartMedia, Inc.

== History ==
The station went on the air as WPHQ on February 7, 1990. On July 1, 1992, the station changed its call sign to the current WQRB.
