= 880 AM =

AM radio frequency

The following radio stations broadcast on AM frequency 880 kHz: 880 AM is classified as a North American clear-channel frequency by the Federal Communications Commission; WHSQ in New York City is the dominant Class A station on 880 kHz.

== In Argentina ==
- Democracia in Longchamps, Buenos Aires.

== In Brazil ==
- Rádio Inconfidência in Belo Horizonte, Minas Gerais.

== In Canada ==
- CHED in Edmonton, Alberta - 50 kW, transmitter located at 53.368611°N 113.318056°W

== In Mexico ==
- XEV-AM in Chihuahua, Chihuahua

== In the United States ==
Stations in bold are clear-channel stations.

Call sign	City of license	Facility ID	Class	Daytime power (kW)	Nighttime power (kW)	Critical hours and power (kW)	Unlimited power	Transmitter coordinates
KHAC	Tse Bonito, New Mexico	71796	B	10	0.43			35.644722°N 109.020278°W
KHCM	Honolulu, Hawaii	10934	B	2	2			21.294722°N 157.863611°W
KIXI	Mercer Island/Seattle, Washington	4629	B	50	10			47.583056°N 122.181111°W
KJJR	Whitefish, Montana	4578	B	10	0.5			48.395556°N 114.319722°W
KJOZ	Conroe, Texas	20625	B	10	1			30.293889°N 95.431944°W
KKMC	Gonzales, California	43603	B	10	10			36.562778°N 121.434722°W
KLRG	Sheridan, Arkansas	14053	B	50	0.22	31		34.693333°N 92.305833°W (daytime and critical hours); 34.305833°N 92.385°W (nighttime)
KRVN	Lexington, Nebraska	48002	B	50	50			40.515833°N 99.396389°W
KWIP	Dallas, Oregon	32965	B	5	1			44.929167°N 123.289444°W
WAPC	Clanton, Alabama	66212	D	1	0.007			31.308333°N 86.256944°W
**WHSQ**	New York, New York	9636	A				50	40.859722°N 73.785833°W
WIJR	Highland, Illinois	72890	B	1.7	0.16			38.756389°N 89.655°W
WMDB	Nashville, Tennessee	3540	D	2.5	0.002			36.211944°N 86.819167°W
WMEQ	Menomonie, Wisconsin	52474	B	10	0.21			44.845556°N 91.845833°W
WPEK	Fairview, North Carolina	41565	D	5				35.546667°N 82.470833°W
WPIP	Winston-Salem, North Carolina	41508	D	1.8				36.043889°N 80.181944°W
WRFD	Columbus-Worthington, Ohio	58630	D	23		6.1		39.941944°N 83.022222°W
WRRZ	Clinton, North Carolina	73966	D	1				34.977778°N 78.304167°W
WSLK	Moneta, Virginia	31212	D	0.9				37.166667°N 79.630556°W
WXBN	Sweetwater, Florida	21763	B	4	5			25.748889°N 80.547222°W
