= WSLK =

- Moneta, Virginia; United States
- Broadcast area: Southern Bedford County - Northeastern Franklin County
- Frequency: 880 kHz
- Branding: Lake Radio 880

Programming
- Format: Oldies - Adult standards
- Affiliations: Townhall News

Ownership
- Owner: Smile Broadcasting, LLC

History
- First air date: December 1991; 34 years ago
- Former call signs: WBLU (1990–1994); WLQE (1994–1997); WVLR (1997–2001); WCQV (2001–2008)
- Call sign meaning: W Smith (Mountain) Lake

Technical information
- Licensing authority: FCC
- Facility ID: 31212
- Class: D
- Power: 900 watts (daytime only)
- Transmitter coordinates: 37°10′0.0″N 79°37′50.0″W
- Translator: 98.3 W252DP (Moneta)

Links
- Public license information: Public file; LMS
- Webcast: Listen Live
- Website: wslk880.com

WSLK (880 AM, "Lake Radio 880") is a commercial radio station licensed to Moneta, Virginia. It broadcasts an oldies and adult standards radio format and is owned and operated by Smile Broadcasting, LLC. The studios and offices are on Village Springs Drive in Hardy, Virginia.

WSLK is a daytimer station, powered at 900 watts non-directional. AM 880 is a clear channel frequency reserved for Class A station WHSQ in New York City. To avoid interference, at night WSLK goes off the air. The transmitter is off Moneta Road in Moneta. The station's signal covers the Smith Mountain Lake area in parts of Bedford and Franklin Counties in Virginia. Programming is heard around the clock on 250-watt FM translator W252DP at 98.3 MHz in Moneta.

== History ==
This station received its original construction permit from the Federal Communications Commission on January 4, 1990. The new station was assigned the call sign WBLU by the FCC on February 7, 1990. WBLU received its license to cover from the FCC on December 18, 1991.

Smile Broadcasting LLC purchased WCQV, at the time a Southern Gospel station, from Perception Media Group in a deal announced in February 2008. The station was sold for a reported $125,000.

The station was assigned the current WSLK call sign by the FCC on April 7, 2008.
