= WATQ =

- Chetek, Wisconsin; United States
- Broadcast area: Eau Claire–Chippewa Falls
- Frequency: 106.7 MHz
- Branding: Moose Country 106.7

Programming
- Format: Classic country

Ownership
- Owner: iHeartMedia, Inc.; (iHM Licenses, LLC)
- Sister stations: WBIZ, WBIZ-FM, WMEQ, WMEQ-FM, WQRB

History
- First air date: November 5, 1992
- Former call signs: WVXD (1992–1997)

Technical information
- Licensing authority: FCC
- Facility ID: 36357
- Class: C2
- ERP: 35,000 watts
- HAAT: 178 m (584 ft)
- Transmitter coordinates: 45°11′4.00″N 91°43′52.00″W

Links
- Public license information: Public file; LMS
- Website: moose106.com

WATQ (106.7 FM) is a radio station broadcasting a classic country format. Licensed to Chetek, Wisconsin, United States, the station serves the Eau Claire area. The station is currently owned by iHeartMedia, Inc..

== History ==
The construction permit application for a new FM station on 106.7 MHz at Chetek was filed with the Federal Communications Commission on September 27, 1991, and was granted on September 18, 1992. The permit was originally associated with the FCC application identifier 910927MB, and the call sign WVXD was assigned on November 5, 1992. The permit grant was challenged by Red Cedar Broadcasting; the FCC denied Red Cedar's application for review of a staff decision that had denied Red Cedar's informal objection and granted Lake Shore Communications of Chetek's application for WVXD(FM).

The unbuilt station changed hands during the 1990s. The M Street Journal reported a proposed transfer of WVXD's construction permit from Lake Shore Communications of Chetek, Inc., to Chetek Broadcasting Co., Inc.; FCC records list that assignment application as filed November 20, 1995, and granted April 19, 1996. Chetek Broadcasting also pursued engineering changes to the construction permit, including 1996 filings involving changes to effective radiated power, antenna and transmitter location. Later in 1996, The M Street Journal reported that Chetek Broadcasting Company, Inc., and Bloomer Broadcasting Company, Inc., became Phillips Broadcasting Company, Inc.; FCC records list the related assignment application as filed October 10, 1996, and granted October 23, 1996.

The station changed call signs from WVXD to WATQ on February 14, 1997. Phillips Broadcasting filed the station's license-to-cover application on June 2, 1997, and the FCC granted the license on September 3, 1997. By 1999, radio trade publications described WATQ as a classic country station using the "Moose" identity.

In April 1999, Cumulus Media agreed to acquire Phillips Broadcasting's Eau Claire-market stations for $14.8 million. The group included WATQ, WQRB, WBIZ, WBIZ-FM, WMEQ and WMEQ-FM. Cumulus began operating the stations under a local marketing agreement while awaiting FCC approval. In 2000, Cumulus' Eau Claire stations were included in an exchange with Clear Channel Communications. The FCC's Clear Channel/AMFM merger order listed WATQ as being assigned from Cumulus Licensing Corp. to Capstar TX L.P. under file number BALH-20000501AAT.

WATQ continued as part of Clear Channel's Eau Claire cluster. In 2002, Northpine reported that WATQ's studio was co-located with Clear Channel's other Eau Claire stations. Clear Channel's radio business was renamed iHeartMedia in 2014. FCC public notices show later corporate filings involving WATQ, including a 2020 assignment from Capstar TX, LLC to iHM Licenses, LLC and a 2024 transfer of control within iHeartMedia.

As of 2026, WATQ is licensed to Chetek, Wisconsin, as a Class C2 FM station on 106.7 MHz and is branded "Moose Country 106.7", airing a classic country format.
