= KSUH =

- Puyallup, Washington; United States
- Broadcast area: Tacoma, Washington
- Frequency: 1450 kHz
- Branding: Radio Hankook

Programming
- Language: Korean
- Format: K-pop; news

Ownership
- Owner: Radio Hankook, Inc.
- Sister stations: KWYZ

History
- First air date: December 1, 1951
- Former call signs: KPWN (1951); KPUY (1951–1954); KAYE (1954–1973); KUPY (1973–1979); KRPM (1979–1981); KJUN (1981–1996); KKBY (1996–1997)
- Call sign meaning: Jean J. Suh, station owner

Technical information
- Licensing authority: FCC
- Facility ID: 32339
- Class: C
- Power: 1,000 watts (unlimited)
- Transmitter coordinates: 47°10′40.4″N 122°16′28.4″W

Links
- Public license information: Public file; LMS
- Website: www.radiohankook.com

KSUH (1450 AM, "Radio Hankook") is a U.S. radio station licensed to serve Puyallup, Washington. The station, which began broadcasting in 1951, is currently owned by Radio Hankook, Inc. Jean Suh, owner of Radio Hankook, is a pioneer in Korean-language radio programming in the United States.

== Programming ==
KSUH broadcasts a mix of Korean language programming to the northern Seattle metropolitan area in a simulcast partnership with a sister station in Everett, KWYZ (1230 AM). In addition to South Korean popular music (also known as "K-pop"), Radio Hankook airs up to six hours of daily talk radio programming, including local and South Korean news, information for recently-arrived immigrants from South Korea, and community affairs. Other programming includes a program for children in both Korean and English plus a short twice-daily show for all ages that aims to teach basic English language skills.

== History ==
=== The beginning ===
This station began regular broadcasting on December 1, 1951, with 100 watts of power on a frequency of 1450 kHz. Licensed with call sign KPUY, the station was owned and operated by Clarence E. Wilson. By early 1953, KAYE had upgraded to 250 watt operation and Clarence E. Wilson took on P.D. Jackson as a partner in station ownership.

=== Gone country ===
Puyallup Valley Broadcasting Company acquired KPUY from Wilson and Jackson in April 1953, and changed the call sign to KAYE on July 1, 1954. This proved short-lived as by 1957 the broadcast license had been transferred to Henry Perozzo's Radio Station KAYE, Inc.

The sale by Radio Station KAYE, Inc., to KAYE Broadcasters, Inc., was completed on March 27, 1966. The station continued the country & western music format even after the call sign was changed to KUPY on December 11, 1973. KUPY was owned then by local sports legend Bud Blair who was the voice of Puyallup High School sports as well as Pacific Lutheran University. Radio veteran Bill Glass lists this station as his first radio job.

In July 1978, KAYE Broadcasters, Inc., reached an agreement to sell this station to Shortsleeve Broadcasting, Inc. The deal was approved by the Federal Communications Commission (FCC) on July 3, 1978, and the transaction was consummated on October 12, 1978. The station aired a country & western music format with weekly specialty shows, including one in the German language and one on Native American issues. Shortsleeve changed the call sign to KRPM on January 4, 1979.

In October 1981, Shortsleeve Broadcasting, Inc., contracted to sell KRPM to Monroe Enterprises, Inc. The deal was approved by the FCC on December 11, 1981. The new owners had the FCC change the station's call sign to KJUN on December 23, 1981.

In June 1986, Monroe Enterprises, Inc., announced a deal to sell KJUN to 777 Broadcasting, Inc. The deal was approved by the FCC on August 15, 1986, and the transaction was consummated on September 5, 1986.

In June 1990, 777 Broadcasting, Inc., agreed to sell this station to Joy Broadcasting, Inc. The deal was approved by the FCC on August 1, 1990, and the transaction was consummated on October 31, 1990. In 1992, the station's classic country format was linked up as a network, with stations KJUN-FM, KWYZ in Everett, KENU in Enumclaw, KLDY in Olympia and KBLV in Bellevue simulcasting it. The network would be disbanded in early 1996 due to financial issues, with all stations being put up for sale. Joy Broadcasting bought KJUN, and would continue the classic country format. As part of a rebranding of the station's format as "The Cowboy", Joy had the FCC change the station's call sign to KKBY on August 16, 1996.

=== KSUH today ===
In February 1997, Joy Broadcasting, Inc., contracted to sell KKBY to Jean J. Suh. The deal was approved by the FCC on April 4, 1997, and the transaction was finally consummated on August 3, 1999. Suh had the FCC change the station's call sign to KSUH after her family name on September 15, 1997. Suh applied to the FCC in October 2002 to transfer the broadcast license for this station to her company, Radio Hancook, Inc. The transfer was approved by the FCC on November 15, 2002, and the transaction was consummated on December 1, 2003.

Jean J. Suh worked for five years as an actress as South Korea's Korean Broadcasting System before emigrating to the United States in 1964. While studying at Columbia College Hollywood in 1965, Suh began hosting a 30-minute weekly program of music and news in Korean on a Los Angeles radio station. In 1966 the program was extended to one hour per week and in 1967 to two hours each weekday. In 1970, Suh and two financial partners launched an independent Korean-language radio station in Los Angeles, the first in the United States. Suh purchased KKBY (now KSUH) in 1997 and KWYZ in 1999 to cover the southern and northern halves of the greater Seattle metropolitan area, respectively, as Korean-language "Radio Hankook".

== Controversy ==
=== Studio location ===
Faced with financial difficulties and mounting debts, station owner Jean J. Suh moved KSUH and KWYZ out of their rented studios in a commercial area of Federal Way, Washington, to her private residence in May 2000. This sparked protests from neighbors, visits from city code enforcement officers, and a public campaign by the station to force the city to allow the studios to remain in Suh's home. Ultimately, the city prevailed in the face of growing community frustration and the stations moved out of the home in late April 2001.

=== FCC issues ===
During a series of inspections by agents from the FCC's Seattle office carried out over the period from March 2001 to November 2001, they found that KSUH had failed to "have operational Emergency Alert System (EAS) equipment" and "to conduct required monthly and weekly EAS tests", failed to "post the ASR number on or near the base of" its broadcast tower, and failed to paint or maintain the tower to ensure "good visibility" in violation of FCC rules. After a January 2002 notice of these violations, licensee Jean J. Suh told the FCC that the station had modified its EAS equipment for automatic operation and that she did not own the KSUH tower but was leasing it from the station's previous license holder. The FCC issued a "notice of apparent liability" against Suh for violations by KSUH and KWYZ on August 28, 2002, for a combined total of $22,000. After determining that Suh did not own the KSUH tower, they reduced the penalty to $10,000 in late August 2003.
