= WIAL =

Coordinates: 44.830°N 91.447°W

- Elk Mound, Wisconsin; United States
- Broadcast area: Eau Claire–Chippewa Falls
- Frequency: 94.1 MHz
- Branding: I-94

Programming
- Format: Hot AC

Ownership
- Owner: Mid-West Family Broadcasting; (Clear Water Brands, Inc.)
- Sister stations: WAXX, WAYY, WEAQ, WECL, WISM

History
- First air date: January 11, 1948 (78 years ago)
- Former call signs: WEAU-FM (1948–1959)
- Call sign meaning: Variation of the word "wail"

Technical information
- Licensing authority: FCC
- Facility ID: 7063
- Class: C1
- ERP: 84,000 watts
- HAAT: 114 m (374 ft)

Links
- Public license information: Public file; LMS
- Webcast: Listen Live
- Website: i94online.com

WIAL (94.1 FM) is a radio station in the Eau Claire area of Wisconsin, with its studio/offices located in Altoona, Wisconsin. Its transmitter is located in Eau Claire, Wisconsin.

== History ==
The station began in January 11, 1948 as an easy listening station with the call letters WEAU-FM. In 1959, the callsign was switched to WIAL, similar to "The Wonderful WAIL" (WAYL, now KXXR) in Minneapolis. On November 1, 1982, WIAL switched formats to become Adult Contemporary, in the wake of the transition of pop/rock formats from AM to FM stations and debuted the name "I-94" after Interstate 94 which runs along the south and west side of Eau Claire. Right when 1986 rolled along, the station upgraded its format to Top 40 to compete against WBIZ-FM. It currently airs a Hot Adult Contemporary format, with Tom Stryker mornings, Sue Kelly middays, and Jesse afternoons.

WIAL was sold to Midwest Family Communications in 1991 along with sister WEAQ-AM. In 1993, Midwest Family purchased WECL-FM. Then the stations were sold to Central Communications (consisting of WAXX-FM and WAYY-AM) in 1996 and moved to the Central studios in Altoona, WI. The five stations, along with the then-new sister station WDRK-FM, were sold to Maverick Media, LLC, in 2003. In 2013, Mid-West Family Broadcasting Inc re-purchased WIAL (along with WEAQ-AM).

WIAL switched to a Hot Adult Contemporary format in March 2003. In 2005, the station shifted to a mainstream Adult Contemporary format. On August 17, 2012, the station returned to a Hot AC format.

WIAL and its Eau Claire sister stations, along with Maverick Media's Rockford, Illinois stations, were sold to Mid-West Family Broadcasting for $15.5 million. The purchase of the Eau Claire stations was consummated on October 1, 2013, while the Rockford station purchases were consummated on June 1, 2014.

Effective March 29, 2021, WIAL changed its city of license from Eau Claire to Elk Mound.

== Previous logos ==
WIAL logo 1982 to circa-1987

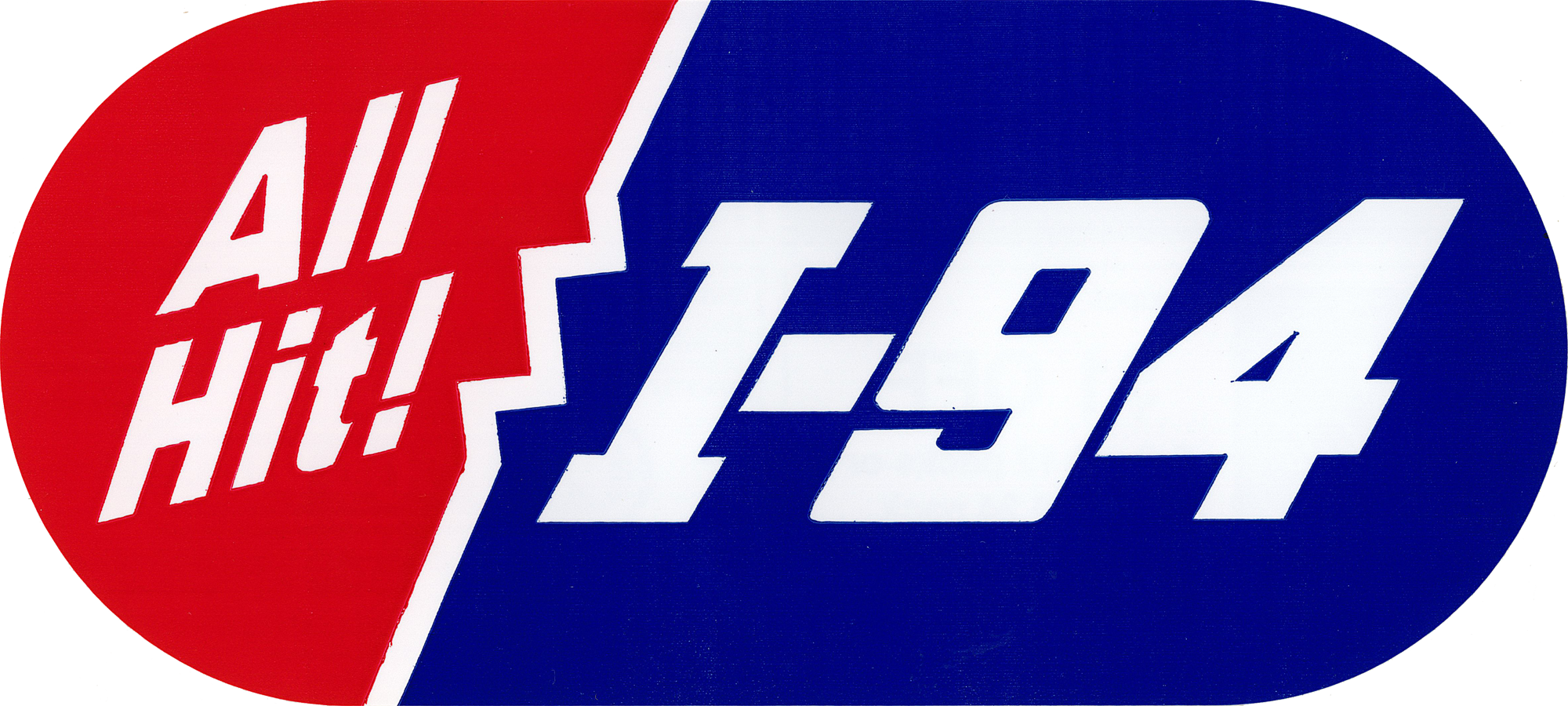
WIAL logo circa 1987-mid-1990s

WIAL logo mid-1990s to 2003

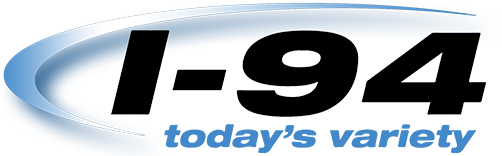
WIAL logo 2003 to 2020
