= WMEQ (AM) =

- Menomonie, Wisconsin; United States
- Broadcast area: Eau Claire–Chippewa Falls
- Frequency: 880 kHz
- Branding: Newstalk 880

Programming
- Format: Conservative Talk
- Network: Fox News Radio
- Affiliations: Premiere Networks; Big Apple Media; Minnesota Vikings Radio Network

Ownership
- Owner: iHeartMedia, Inc.; (iHM Licenses, LLC)
- Sister stations: WATQ, WBIZ, WBIZ-FM, WMEQ-FM, WQRB

History
- First air date: May 1951; 75 years ago
- Former call signs: WMNE (1951–1989)
- Call sign meaning: W-MEnomonie & Eau Q(C)laire

Technical information
- Licensing authority: FCC
- Facility ID: 52474
- Class: AM: B FM: D
- Power: AM: 10,000 watts day 210 watts night
- ERP: FM: 130 watts
- Transmitter coordinates: 44°50′44.00″N 91°50′45.00″W
- Translator: 106.3 W292EG (Eau Claire)

Links
- Public license information: Public file; LMS
- Webcast: Listen Live
- Website: wmeq.iheart.com

WMEQ (880 kHz) is a commercial AM radio station licensed to Menomonie, Wisconsin, and serving the Eau Claire area. It broadcasts a conservative talk format and is owned by iHeartMedia, Inc.

By day, WMEQ transmits at 10,000 watts. AM 880 is a clear channel frequency reserved for Class A station WHSQ in New York City, requiring WMEQ to reduce power to 210 watts at sunset. It uses a directional antenna with a four-tower array to protect WHSQ from interference at night. Programming is also heard on a 130 watt FM translator in Eau Claire, W292EG at 106.3 MHz.

== Programming ==
Most of the programs on WMEQ are nationally syndicated, primarily from co-owned Premiere Networks. Weekdays begin with Your Morning Show with Michael DelGiorno. He's followed by The Glenn Beck Radio Program, The O'Reilly Update with Bill O'Reilly, The Clay Travis and Buck Sexton Show, The Sean Hannity Show, The Jesse Kelly Show, The Michael Berry Show and Coast to Coast AM with George Noory.

Weekends feature shows on money, health, the outdoors, gardening, technology, home repair, and the law. Weekend syndicated shows include In the Garden with Ron Wilson, At Home with Gary Sullivan, Rich DeMuro on Tech, Armstrong & Getty, Bill Handel on the Law and Sunday Nights with Bill Cunningham. Most hours begin with world and national news from Fox News Radio. WMEQ carries Minnesota Vikings games during football season.

== History ==
In May 1951, the station signed on the air. The original call sign was WMNE. It was a daytimer, broadcasting with 1,000 watts on 1360 kHz, but was required to go off the air at night. In 1967, it added an FM sister station, 92.1 WDMW (now WMEQ-FM).

WMNE 1360 changed its call letters to WMEQ in 1989, when it also switched its dial position to 880 kHz. The new frequency allowed the station to broadcast at 5,000 watts by day, increasing its coverage area. It later boosted its daytime power to 10,000 watts.
