= WBIZ (AM) =

- Eau Claire, Wisconsin; United States
- Broadcast area: Eau Claire–Chippewa Falls
- Frequency: 1400 kHz
- Branding: 98.7 The Fan

Programming
- Format: Sports
- Affiliations: KFAN Sports Network; Fox Sports Radio; Minnesota Twins; Minnesota Wild

Ownership
- Owner: iHeartMedia, Inc.; (iHM Licenses, LLC)
- Sister stations: WATQ, WBIZ-FM, WMEQ, WMEQ-FM, WQRB

History
- First air date: 1947
- Former call signs: WBIZ (1947–1988); WEUZ (1988–1991)

Technical information
- Licensing authority: FCC
- Facility ID: 2107
- Class: C
- Power: 970 watts
- Transmitter coordinates: 44°48′58.00″N 91°31′9.00″W
- Translator: 98.7 W254CN (Eau Claire)

Links
- Public license information: Public file; LMS
- Webcast: Listen Live
- Website: thefanec.iheart.com

WBIZ (1400 kHz) is an AM radio station broadcasting a sports format. Licensed to Eau Claire, Wisconsin, the station serves the Eau Claire area. The station is owned by iHeartMedia, Inc.

== History ==
The station signed on in 1947 as WBIZ. The call sign was changed to WEUZ on May 19, 1988. On April 8, 1991, the station changed back to WBIZ.

In July 2012, WBIZ filed an application for a U.S. Federal Communications Commission (FCC) construction permit to decrease power to 970 watts.

On July 18, 2016, the station flipped from sports talk (largely carrying the Fox Sports Radio network) to classic rock as 98.7 The Brew, adding an FM simulcast at 98.7.

On July 24, 2020, WBIZ returned to sports talk as 98.7 The Fan. The station carries a mix of programming from sister stations KFXN-FM in Minneapolis and WRNW in Milwaukee, with Fox Sports Radio programming during nights and weekends; it also broadcasts local high school sports, the Milwaukee Bucks, and the Minnesota Twins, Vikings, and Wild.
