= WAPC (AM) =

Currently silent
- Clanton, Alabama; United States
- Frequency: 880 kHz

Ownership
- Owner: Christopher W. Johnson

History
- First air date: 1953
- Former call signs: WAMI (1953–2025)
- Former frequencies: 860 kHz (1953–2016)

Technical information
- Licensing authority: FCC
- Facility ID: 66212
- Class: D
- Power: 1,000 watts day 7 watts night
- Transmitter coordinates: 31°18′29″N 86°15′25″W

Links
- Public license information: Public file; LMS

WAPC (880 kHz) is a silent AM radio station formerly broadcasting a gospel music format. Licensed to Clanton, Alabama, United States, the station is owned by Christopher W. Johnson.

== History ==
The station was first licensed in 1953 as WAMI on 860 kHz. It was once owned by The Opp Broadcasting Co., Inc., along with WAMI-FM, and featured programming from ABC Radio.

In June 2016, a license transfer was initiated to transfer ownership from Opp Broadcasting Company, Inc., to Christopher W. Johnson, which was consummated on March 10, 2017.

WAMI, which had been silent for years, won a construction permit to move up 20 kHz to 880 kHz, with 1,000 watts during the daytime only. If built, the station owners planned to apply for a translator to go along with the station. A license to cover was filed for that facility in early October 2016.

WAMI was reported off air starting on March 10, 2017, coincident with the transfer to new ownership.

The call sign was changed to WAPC on February 5, 2025.
