= Altoona, Wisconsin =

- City
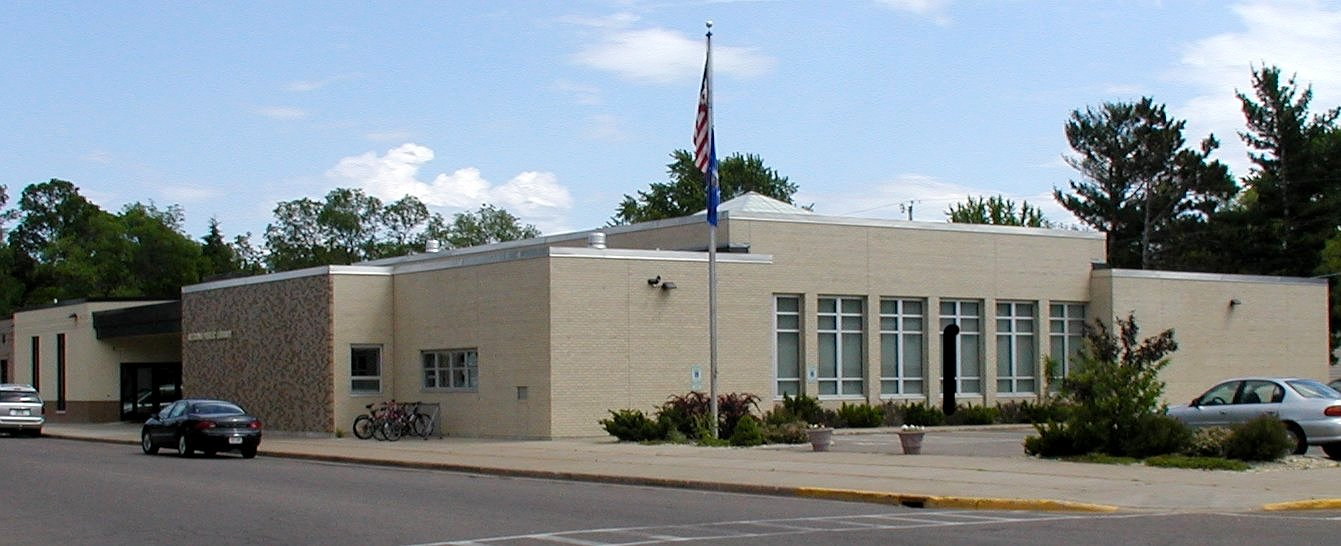
- City hall and public library

- Location within Eau Claire County and Wisconsin

- Location within Wisconsin Location within the United States
- Coordinates: 44°48′15″N 91°26′32″W
- Country: United States
- State: Wisconsin
- County: Eau Claire

Government
  - Mayor: Brendan Pratt
  - City Administrator: Mike Golat

Area
  - Total: 4.98 sq mi (12.90 km^{2})
  - Land: 4.73 sq mi (12.26 km^{2})
  - Water: 0.25 sq mi (0.65 km^{2})
- Elevation: 896 ft (273 m)

Population (2020)
  - Total: 8,293
  - Estimate (2021): 8,817
  - Density: 1,662.9/sq mi (642.06/km^{2})
- Time zone: UTC-6 (Central (CST))
  - Summer (DST): UTC-5 (CDT)
- ZIP codes: 54720
- Area codes: 715 & 534
- FIPS code: 55-01550
- GNIS feature ID: 1560807
- Website: www.altoonawi.gov

Altoona (/ælˈtuːnə/ al-TOO-nə) is a city in Eau Claire County, Wisconsin, United States. The population was 8,292 at the 2020 census with an estimated population in 2022 of 9,149. The city is a railroad terminal on the Union Pacific Railroad.

== History ==
The settlement of Altoona began in 1881 when the Chicago, St. Paul, Minneapolis and Omaha Railway selected the site for a new terminal to replace the overcrowded existing terminal in Eau Claire. The railroad had originally planned to put the new terminal in Fall Creek, but the city of Eau Claire lobbied for a site closer to the existing one, and representatives from Eau Claire and the railroad walked the tracks from Fall Creek to Eau Claire to determine a suitable site. When the location of present-day Altoona - approximately three miles east of the existing Eau Claire terminal - was found to have sufficient flat land and access to water (via the Eau Claire River), the railroad began construction of the new terminal and the community of "East Eau Claire" was platted in October.

Residents began moving into the community in early 1882 and the railroad terminal became operational in May of that year. However, confusion between the "Eau Claire" and "East Eau Claire" stations quickly caused the railroad to rename the new terminal "Altoona" on October 14, 1882. The name Altoona was based on Altoona, Pennsylvania, which in turn was named after Allatoona, Georgia. The name choice may also have been influenced by the presence of immigrants from Altona, Germany. Altoona was incorporated as a city on April 5, 1887.

Continued growth in both Altoona and Eau Claire over the past century has left the two cities adjacent to one another, with Fairfax St. and Bus. 53 providing a general boundary between the two, although the actual border is irregular. County Highway AA generally forms the eastern limits of the city. Altoona is bounded on the north by Lake Altoona and the Eau Claire River. To the south, the city limits generally follow Otter Creek.

== Geography ==
Altoona is located at 44°48′15″N 91°26′32″W (44.804110, -91.442183).

According to the United States Census Bureau, the city has a total area of 4.86 square miles (12.59 km^{2}), of which 4.65 square miles (12.04 km^{2}) is land and 0.21 square miles (0.54 km^{2}) water.

Altoona is situated near Lake Altoona, a man-made lake, with water provided by the Eau Claire River.

== Demographics ==
Historical population
Census	Pop.	Note	%±
1890	805		—
1900	721		−10.4%
1910	824		14.3%
1920	960		16.5%
1930	1,044		8.8%
1940	1,239		18.7%
1950	1,713		38.3%
1960	2,114		23.4%
1970	2,842		34.4%
1980	4,393		54.6%
1990	5,889		34.1%
2000	6,698		13.7%
2010	6,706		0.1%
2020	8,293		23.7%
2021 (est.)	8,817		6.3%

=== 2020 census ===
As of the census of 2020, the population was 8,293. The population density was 1,752.2 inhabitants per square mile (676.5/km^{2}). There were 3,725 housing units at an average density of 787.0 per square mile (303.9/km^{2}). Ethnically, the population was 3.2% Hispanic or Latino of any race. When grouping both Hispanic and non-Hispanic people together by race, the city was 89.2% White, 2.2% Asian, 1.5% Black or African American, 0.3% Native American, 1.6% from other races, and 5.1% from two or more races.

According to the American Community Survey estimates for 2016–2020, the median income for a household in the city was $63,556, and the median income for a family was $75,980. Male full-time workers had a median income of $51,783 versus $50,843 for female workers. The per capita income for the city was $32,966. About 8.1% of families and 12.4% of the population were below the poverty line, including 16.0% of those under age 18 and 4.1% of those age 65 or over. Of the population age 25 and over, 93.9% were high school graduates or higher and 33.8% had a bachelor's degree or higher.

=== 2010 census ===
At the 2010 census there were 6,706 people, 2,883 households, and 1,775 families living in the city. The population density was 1,442.2 inhabitants per square mile (556.8/km^{2}). There were 3,288 housing units at an average density of 707.1 per square mile (273.0/km^{2}). The racial makeup of the city was 93.5% White, 0.9% African American, 0.4% Native American, 1.9% Asian, 0.8% from other races, and 2.5% from two or more races. Hispanic or Latino of any race were 2.5%.

Of the 2,883 households 31.4% had children under the age of 18 living with them, 43.8% were married couples living together, 13.3% had a female householder with no husband present, 4.4% had a male householder with no wife present, and 38.4% were non-families. 31.3% of households were one person and 14.3% were one person aged 65 or older. The average household size was 2.32 and the average family size was 2.91.

The median age was 37.4 years. 24.8% of residents were under the age of 18; 8.6% were between the ages of 18 and 24; 26.2% were from 25 to 44; 24.6% were from 45 to 64; and 15.8% were 65 or older. The gender makeup of the city was 47.0% male and 53.0% female.

=== 2000 census ===
At the 2000 census there were 6,698 people, 2,844 households, and 1,731 families living in the city. The population density was 1,638.6 people per square mile (632.3/km^{2}). There were 3,063 housing units at an average density of 749.4 per square mile (289.2/km^{2}). The racial makup of the city was 95.89% White, 0.40% African American, 0.58% Native American, 1.15% Asian, 0.07% Pacific Islander, 0.27% from other races, and 1.63% from two or more races. Hispanic or Latino of any race were 0.73%.

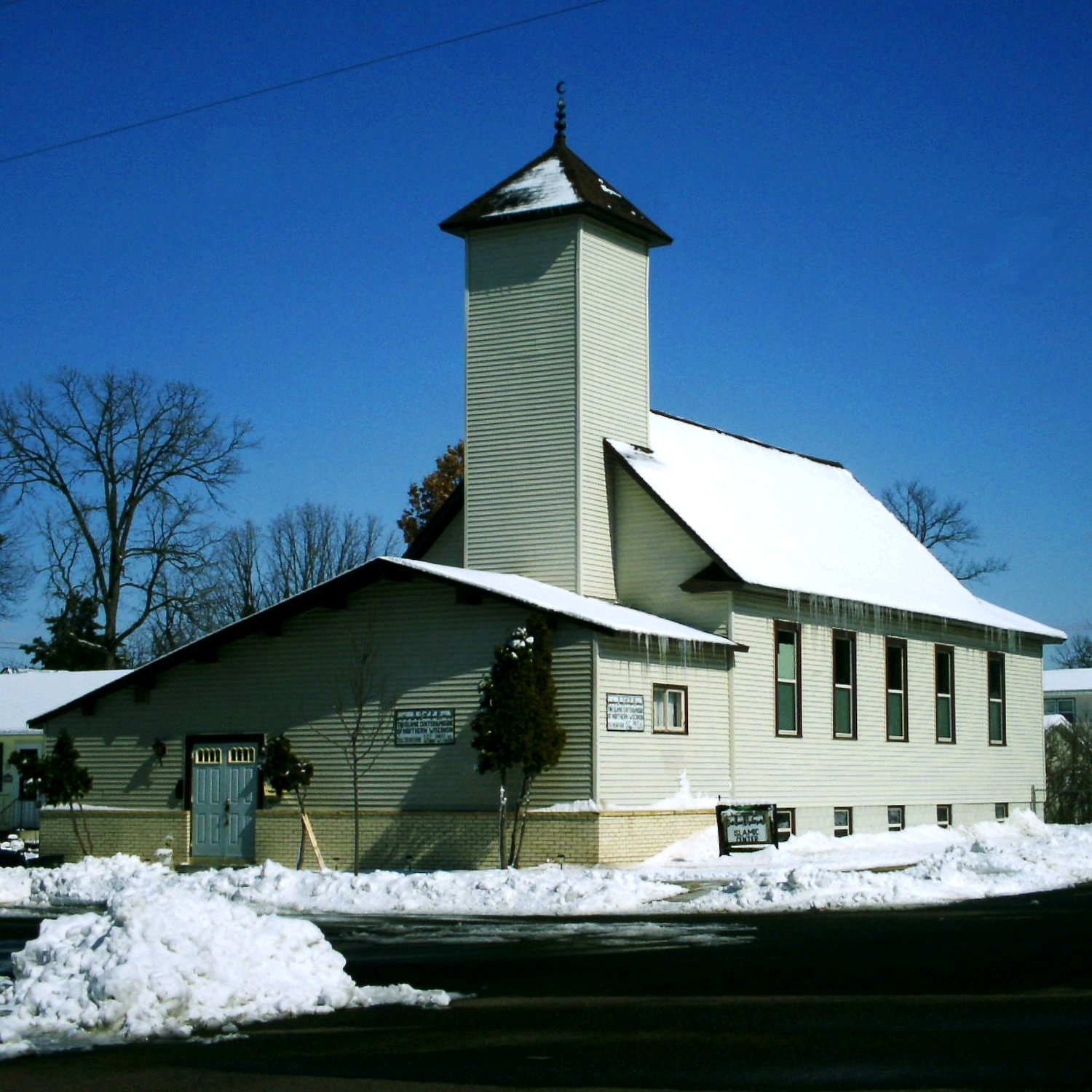
The Islamic Society of Northern Wisconsin Mosque in Altoona

Of the 2,844 households 31.2% had children under the age of 18 living with them, 46.0% were married couples living together, 11.4% had a female householder with no husband present, and 39.1% were non-families. 31.6% of households were one person and 14.7% were one person aged 65 or older. The average household size was 2.30 and the average family size was 2.92.

The age distribution was 24.3% under the age of 18, 9.4% from 18 to 24, 29.4% from 25 to 44, 20.9% from 45 to 64, and 16.0% 65 or older. The median age was 36 years. For every 100 females, there were 90.2 males. For every 100 females age 18 and over, there were 84.0 males.

The median household income was $40,394 and the median family income was $49,441. Males had a median income of $33,505 versus $22,200 for females. The per capita income for the city was $21,236. About 4.4% of families and 5.2% of the population were below the poverty line, including 6.3% of those under age 18 and 4.6% of those age 65 or over.

== Education ==
Altoona is primarily served by the School District of Altoona, and a small parcel is covered by the Eau Claire Area School District. Altoona High School serves most of the area's students. On November 4, 2014, a referendum passed approving a new energy-efficient elementary school on County Road KB.

== Media ==
Altoona is a part of the Eau Claire media market; until early 2009, it was served by its own free weekly newspaper, the Altoona Star. Altoona is also home to the studios and offices of Mid-West Family Broadcasting stations WAYY, WEAQ, WECL, WIAL, and WAXX.

== Notable people ==
- Leonard Haas, third president (1959–1971) and first chancellor (1973–1980) of the University of Wisconsin–Eau Claire.
- Fuzzy Thurston, Green Bay Packers offensive lineman (1958–1967), 1975 Green Bay Packers Hall of Fame inductee, and for whom the Altoona High School football field is named.
