= Newport Corporate Center =

Office building in Bellevue, Washington

Coordinates: 47.5784°N 122.1660°W

The Newport Corporate Center is a 5-building and 969,986 square foot complex in Factoria, Bellevue, Washington that notably houses T-Mobile US' Headquarters. It also houses the Washington Headquarters of AAA, and the commercial radio stations of KPNW-FM, KKNW and KQMV.
