= KIXI =

Adult standards/oldies radio station in Mercer Island/Seattle, Washington

Coordinates: 47°34′58.4″N 122°10′56.4″W

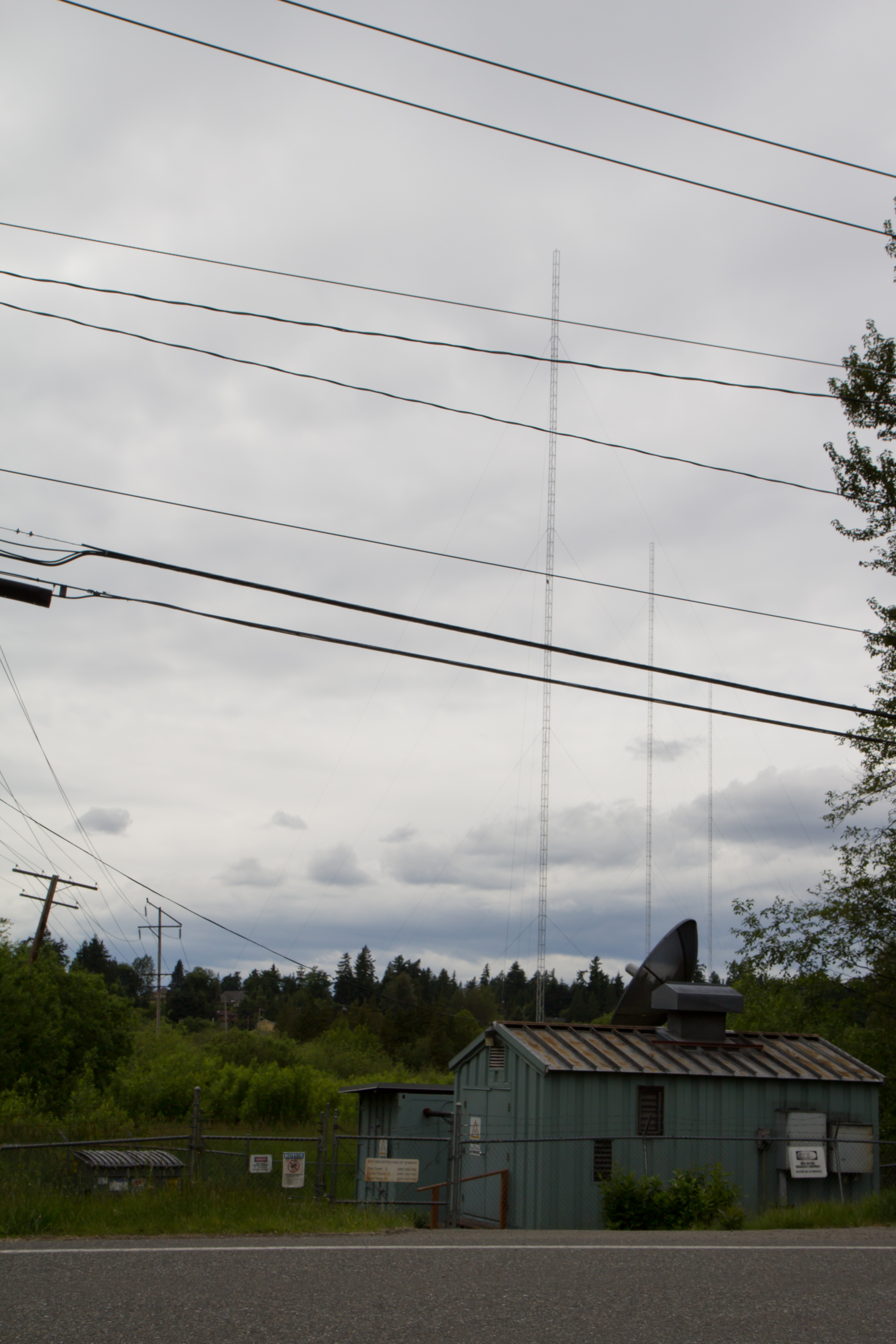
- Mercer Island–Seattle, Washington; United States
- Broadcast area: Seattle metropolitan area
- Frequency: 880 kHz
- Branding: Retro Radio AM 880 KIXI

Programming
- Format: Adult standards, oldies
- Affiliations: NBC News Radio; Bloomberg Radio; Compass Media Networks

Ownership
- Owner: Hubbard Broadcasting; (Seattle FCC License Sub, LLC)
- Sister stations: KQMV, KRWM, KPNW-FM, KKNW

History
- First air date: 1947 (as KXRN at 1220)
- Former call signs: KXRN (1947–1952); KLAN (1952–1958); KQDE (1958–1960); KUDY (1960–1961)
- Former frequencies: 1220 kHz (1947–1951); 1230 kHz (1951–1957); 910 kHz (1957–1983)
- Call sign meaning: IX, I (Roman numerals for 9 and 1, in reference to former AM 910 frequency)

Technical information
- Licensing authority: FCC
- Facility ID: 4629
- Class: B
- Power: 50,000 watts day; 10,000 watts night
- Repeater: 106.9 KRWM-HD3 (Bremerton)

Links
- Public license information: Public file; LMS
- Webcast: Listen live
- Website: www.kixi.com

KIXI (880 AM) is a radio station licensed to Mercer Island/Seattle, Washington. It operates 24 hours a day with a daytime power of 50,000 watts and a nighttime power of 10,000 watts from a transmitter in Mercer Slough Nature Park in Bellevue, where studios are also located (although in a separate location).

== Format ==
KIXI features nostalgic music, such as rock and roll classic oldies mixed in with musical standards. The music spans from the early 1950s through the early 1980s. In recent years the station has moved away from big band music but occasionally plays some. It is the only station in the Seattle area to feature the Imagination Theatre and Twilight Zone radio dramas.

KIXI remains one of the few AM radio stations that continues to program music on the AM band. It has been rated highly as a "Nostalgia" formatted station in the US.

On June 1, 2006, KIXI started to carry the nationally syndicated format Music of Your Life format from Jones Radio Networks. Jones stopped carrying Music of Your Life via satellite in January 2008 in favor of its own standards format, called "Jones Standards" (which has since been discontinued and absorbed into Dial Global's America's Best Music network). However, KIXI remained until April 2009 an affiliate of Music of Your Life, now distributed by Planet Halo, Incorporated.

The station was the first AM station in Seattle to transmit its signal in IBOC digital radio during a joint demonstration with Harris Corporation and iBiquity, the licensee of the new digital AM transmission method. KIXI can also be heard in HD Radio on KRWM 106.9 FM HD3.

== History ==
KIXI took the air in 1947 as KXRN, a 250-watt Renton station broadcasting at 1220 kHz during daytime hours only. KXRN was owned by the Interlake Broadcasting Company. It was built by Frank C. Cook, who was also the radio announcer. In 1951, the station moved to 1230 kHz and changed its call letters to KLAN a year later.

KLAN became a full-time station broadcasting with 1,000 watts at 910 kHz in 1957. Purchased the following year by former KRSC and KJR personality Wally Nelskog, the station became top-40 KQDE, or "Cutie Radio". A sister station on 1230 kHz in Everett, KQTY, also used the same branding. One of Seattle's first black deejays, Bob Summerrise, brought an R&B influence to his airshift on KQDE. (Summerrise would later own soul-formatted KYAC, which took the air in 1964.) In 1960, KQDE would change its call letters to the more phonetic KUDY and changed its city of license to Seattle.

Failing to make an impact in the top-40 battle dominated by KJR and KOL, the station became beautiful music KIXI in late 1961. (The call letters were a Roman numeral representation of the station's "9-1" dial position.) Bob Liddle, formerly of KXL and KEX in Portland, Oregon, joined the airstaff and would stay with KIXI for 45 years. During the 1970s, Liddle teamed with Dean Smith on News 90, one of Seattle's first all-news morning drive programs.

A partnership led by J. Elroy McCaw, owner of Tacoma television station KTVW and father of future cellular telephone tycoon Craig McCaw, purchased a 50-percent interest in KIXI in 1963. The group also acquired FM beautiful music station KGMJ from Rogan Jones, founder of the pioneering radio automation firm IGM. KGMJ became KIXI-FM and simulcasted the AM station's programming. McCaw died suddenly of a stroke in 1969, exposing a considerable amount of debt accumulated from his speculation on radio and television stations, including WINS in New York and KYA in San Francisco. With the exception of a small cable television system in Centralia, McCaw's entire broadcasting portfolio was sold off to pay down the debt service. Wally Nelskog and two Richland physicians purchased KIXI and KIXI-FM in 1971.

The beautiful music simulcast ended in 1980, with the AM side adopting an oldies format and the FM station programming adult contemporary as "KIXI Lite". A move to the 880 kHz frequency a year later allowed for a daytime power boost to 50,000 watts, and in 1986, a nighttime increase to 10,000 watts. With the move, KIXI (AM) began running a satellite-fed adult standards format. That same year, Nelskog sold the station to Thunder Bay Communications. In December 1987, the group sold the AM station to Sunbelt Communications, while the FM station, which had become KLTX, was sold to Ackerley.

KIXI was purchased by Sandusky Radio, owners of KLSY, in November 1991. Hiring personalities such as Jim Dai and Dan Murphy in 1993, the station dropped the AM Only satellite service for a locally voicetracked lineup. Bob Dearborn, best known for his work at WCFL in Chicago, was the KIXI program director from 1994 to 1999. He was replaced by Bob Brooks, formerly of KLSY.

While the aging demographics of the adult standards audience forced many stations in larger markets to drop the format in the late 1990s, KIXI continued to enjoy modest success, often selling advertising time as an "add-on" to spots on KLSY or the other stations in the Sandusky Seattle group. Finally, in a move that led to an outcry from a loyal listener base, KIXI abruptly began airing Music of Your Life satellite programming on June 1, 2006. With the exception of Dan Murphy, who continued to voice station promotions and weekday weather forecasts, the entire KIXI airstaff was terminated. In April 2009, KIXI dropped the Music of Your Life programming after three years and returned to local programming. In the past ten years the station gradually modified its sound to more of an oldies format playing some rock and roll oldies as well as some early soft rock along with some traditional pop standards mixed in. In July 2013, Sandusky announced it would sell its radio holdings in Seattle and Phoenix, Arizona to Hubbard Broadcasting. The sale was completed that November. However, the station is now largely voicetracked and automated - with total operations being overseen by Dan Murphy. COVID-19 forced cuts at KIXI on May 12, 2020. Dan Murphy was cut from the staff by Hubbard Broadcasting.
