= WBIZ-FM =

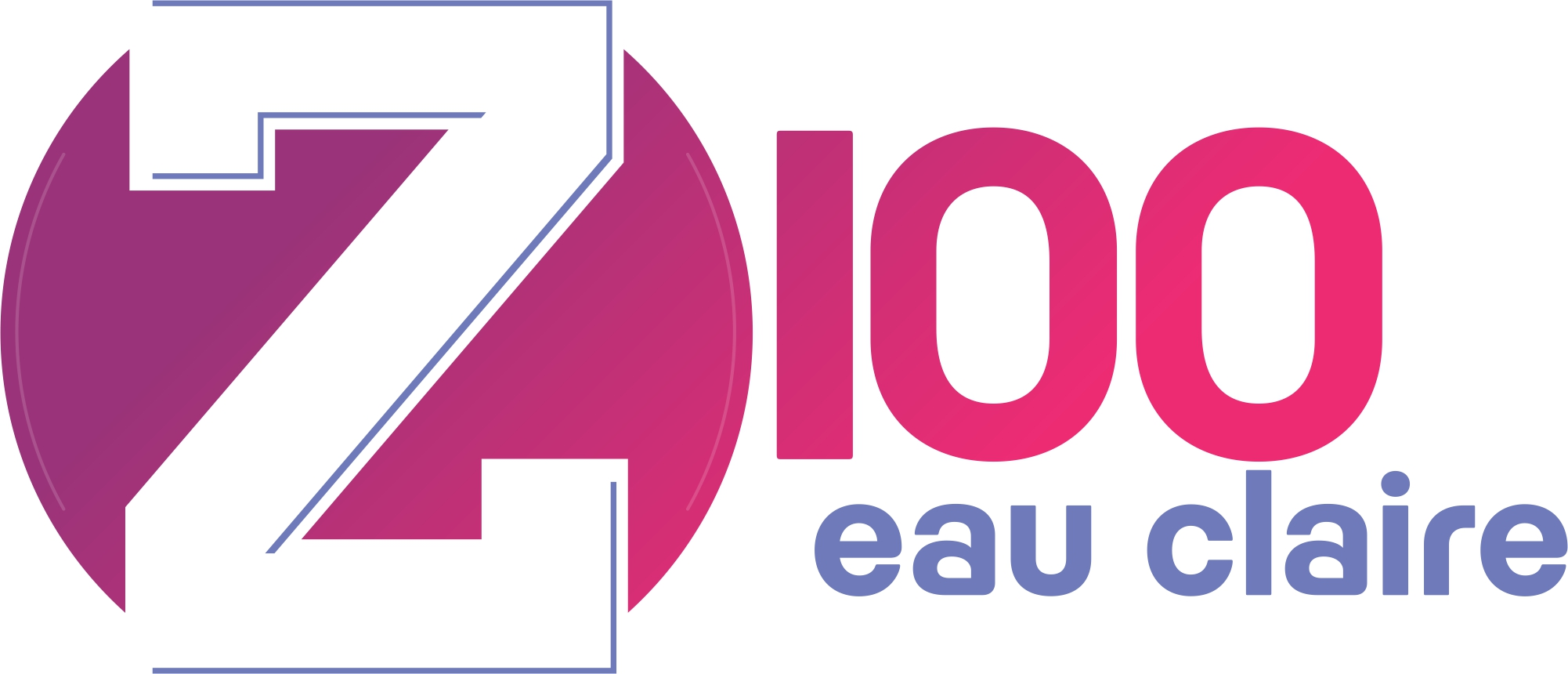
- Eau Claire, Wisconsin; United States
- Broadcast area: Eau Claire–Chippewa Falls
- Frequency: 100.7 MHz
- Branding: Z100

Programming
- Format: Top 40 (CHR)
- Affiliations: Premiere Networks; Packers Radio Network; Wisconsin Badgers football

Ownership
- Owner: iHeartMedia, Inc.; (iHM Licenses, LLC)
- Sister stations: WATQ, WBIZ, WMEQ, WMEQ-FM, WQRB

History
- First air date: December 27, 1967
- Call sign meaning: Inherited from WBIZ (AM)

Technical information
- Licensing authority: FCC
- Facility ID: 2108
- Class: C1
- ERP: 100,000 watts
- HAAT: 147 m (482 ft)
- Transmitter coordinates: 44°55′43.9″N 91°32′31.6″W

Links
- Public license information: Public file; LMS
- Webcast: Listen Live
- Website: z100radio.iheart.com

WBIZ-FM (100.7 MHz, "Z100") is a top 40 (CHR) radio station in Eau Claire, Wisconsin, United States, the station serves the Eau Claire–Chippewa Falls. The station is currently owned by iHeartMedia. The studios are located in Eau Claire while the transmitter is located near County Highway T and 60th Ave north of Eau Claire.

The station airs programming from iHeartMedia's Premiere Networks such as On Air with Ryan Seacrest, On the Move with Enrique Santos, Most Requested Live with Romeo, American Top 40, iHeartRadio Countdown, and The Vibe with Tanya and EJ.

WBIZ-FM also serves as Eau Claire's radio home of the Green Bay Packers and Wisconsin Badgers football.

== History ==
former logo

In 1966, WBIZ, Inc., the owner of WBIZ on 1400 AM, applied to construct an FM station on 100.7 MHz in Eau Claire. WECL, Inc., also sought the frequency, and the Federal Communications Commission (FCC) designated the competing applications for a comparative hearing in April 1967. Both applicants proposed 100,000-watt stations. On July 10, the FCC approved an agreement between the applicants, dismissed WECL's application, and granted WBIZ's construction permit.

WBIZ-FM began broadcasting in December 1967 with 100,000 watts, initially simulcasting WBIZ. The stations were owned by WBIZ, Inc., headed by president and general manager Howard G. Bill, and were based at 609 Cameron Street. The frequency had previously been occupied by WEAU-FM, which moved to 104.5 MHz in 1967. WBIZ-FM initially transmitted from the former WEAU tower on Hastings Way.

By 1970, WBIZ and WBIZ-FM were broadcasting 24 hours a day. Their programming included Top 40 and easy listening music, with progressive rock programs on Monday and Thursday evenings. By 1976, the FM station had separate Top 40 programming and was broadcasting in stereo.

In July 1977, WBIZ, Inc., owned by Bill and Lou Kassera, agreed to sell WBIZ and WBIZ-FM to Sentry Broadcasting for $567,500. Sentry Broadcasting was a subsidiary of the Sentry insurance company. FCC approval of the purchase was reported in January 1978, when Radio & Records described the FM station's music as oldies-oriented. The 1980 Broadcasting Yearbook listed WBIZ-FM as a separately programmed Top 40 station affiliated with ABC. The “Z100” name was in use by 1983.

WBIZ-FM was included in Sage Broadcasting Corporation's 1986 purchase of eight radio stations from Sentry Broadcasting for approximately $9.4 million. In January 1988, Sage announced the sale of its Eau Claire and Stevens Point AM–FM pairs to Americus Communications Partnership, headed by Richard Muzzy, for $5 million.

A November 1989 report in The M Street Journal listed a change at WBIZ-FM from contemporary hits to adult contemporary music and oldies. By 1991, the station was again classified as contemporary hit radio. In 1993, WBIZ-FM's Max McCartney shared the Marconi Radio Award for small-market personality of the year with Tony Wright of KWOX-FM in Woodward, Oklahoma.

In July 1996, Phillips Broadcasting announced its purchase of WBIZ and WBIZ-FM from Americus and began operating the stations under a local marketing agreement. The acquisition expanded Phillips's group of owned or managed Eau Claire-area stations to six. The transaction was subsequently reported at $4 million. By May 1997, WBIZ-FM was operating with an antenna 147 m (482 ft) above average terrain while retaining its 100,000-watt power. On September 15, 1997, the station changed from contemporary hits to modern adult contemporary as “The Zone”.

In April 1999, Cumulus Media announced a $14.8 million purchase of Phillips Broadcasting's six Eau Claire-market stations and began operating them under a local marketing agreement. Under Cumulus's management, WBIZ-FM restored the “Z100” name and contemporary hit format; the return had occurred by April 7.

The Eau Claire stations were included in the first phase of a larger station exchange between Cumulus and Clear Channel Communications in 2000. Cumulus reported that this phase closed on August 25, 2000, transferring 25 stations in five markets to Clear Channel. By 2006, WBIZ-FM's transmitter had moved from the Hastings Way tower to a site north of Eau Claire, while its studios remained on Cameron Street with Clear Channel's other local stations.

Clear Channel adopted the iHeartMedia name on September 16, 2014. In 2015, Mike Sullivan, who had joined the Eau Claire stations in 1974 and worked on WBIZ-FM's morning program, was inducted into the Wisconsin Broadcasters Association Hall of Fame. In June 2026, Z100 morning host and cluster programming executive Dave DeVille was laid off after 20 years with the Eau Claire operation during a wider round of iHeartMedia staff reductions.
