= KPNW-FM =

- Seattle, Washington; United States
- Broadcast area: Seattle metropolitan area
- Frequency: 98.9 MHz (HD Radio)
- Branding: 98.9 The Bull

Programming
- Language: English
- Format: Country music
- Subchannels: HD2: Classic Country (KKNW simulcast)

Ownership
- Owner: Hubbard Broadcasting, Inc.; (Seattle FCC License Sub, LLC)
- Sister stations: KQMV; KRWM; KIXI; KKNW

History
- First air date: May 1958
- Former call signs: KPOS (1958); KMCS (1958–1965); KBBX (1965–1972); KEZX (1972–1995); KWJZ (1995–2011); KLCK-FM (2011–2016); KVRQ (2016–2018); KNUC (2018–2023)
- Call sign meaning: "(K)ountry for the Pacific Northwest" (slogan)

Technical information
- Licensing authority: FCC
- Facility ID: 57843
- Class: C
- ERP: 63,900 watts; 68,000 with beam tilt
- HAAT: 698 meters (2,290 ft)
- Transmitter coordinates: 47.505°N 121.969°W

Links
- Public license information: Public file; LMS
- Webcast: Listen live Listen live (HD2)
- Website: www.989bull.com

KPNW-FM (98.9 MHz "98.9 The Bull") is a commercial radio station in Seattle, Washington. The station is owned by Hubbard Broadcasting and airs a country music radio format. The station's studios and offices are located at Newport Corporate Center on 131st Avenue SE in Bellevue.

KPNW-FM's effective radiated power (ERP) is 63,900 watts (68,000 with beam tilt). Its transmitter is located in Issaquah on Tiger Mountain. KPNW-FM broadcasts in the HD Radio format.

== History ==
=== Early years (1958–1972) ===
In May 1958, the station first signed on as KMCS, owned by Market-Casters, Inc. (hence the call sign). It was then locally owned by former executives with Crown Broadcasting (later to be known as the King Broadcasting Company).

KMCS played popular music and had an effective radiated power of 10,500 watts. From the late 1960s into the late 1980s, the station operated a sub-carrier 67 kHz subsidiary communications authority (SCA), which transmitted music and point of sale commercials to subscribing restaurants and stores in the Puget Sound area, not available on regular FM receivers. The station switched its call letters to KBBX in 1966.

=== Easy listening (1972–1983) ===
KBBX began airing the syndicated easy listening "Music Only For A Woman" format in 1972, supplied by TM. The station also increased its power to 35,000 watts, covering Seattle, Tacoma and adjoining communities. The call letters changed to KEZX. The station's slogan was "Oceans of Beautiful Music".

The SCA was part of the reason that Roy H. Park, owner of Park Broadcasting, purchased the station in late 1975. At the time, Park was one of the largest broadcast companies in the U.S., with many of its stations also airing beautiful music, including WPAT-WPAT-FM in the New York metropolitan area. KEZX increased its power to 100,000 watts in early 1977. Prior to Park's ownership, the station was using the Bellevue-based BPI syndicated beautiful music service. Then, in the spring of 1976, Park made an agreement with Darrel Peters of the "FM 100 Plan" from WLOO in Chicago to go with his beautiful music format. Locally originated programming would return in 1980.

=== Adult alternative (1983–1990) ===
By the early 1980s, the easy listening format was beginning to age. In 1983, KEZX flipped to a mix of soft adult contemporary, "West Coast" singer-songwriter music, album oriented rock, and jazz music, a forerunner to today's adult album alternative (AAA) format.

=== Soft adult contemporary (1990–1993) ===
KEZX remained as a AAA station until October 15, 1990, when it reverted to soft AC.

=== Smooth jazz (1993–2010) ===
In August 1993, KEZX became a smooth jazz outlet, a format that was gaining ground in many major US cities. In October 1995, the station's call sign became KWJZ to complement its smooth jazz format, which had achieved positive ratings in the Seattle-Tacoma radio market. In 1996, KWJZ and co-owned AM 1150 (now KKNW) were sold to Sandusky Broadcasting for $26 million.

With the celebration of the 15th anniversary of KWJZ's format in 2008, the station dropped the "Smooth Jazz" part of its branding and became known simply as "98.9 KWJZ". While smooth jazz still made up the majority of its programming, KWJZ incorporated some chill out music, such as that featured on the syndicated program Chill with Mindi Abair (which aired on Sunday nights on KWJZ), as part of a more broadly defined "smooth music" format.

In the 2000s, KWJZ and other smooth jazz stations began a slow decline in ratings due to changes in Arbitron's measurement system. Portable People Meters (PPM) started being introduced in the Seattle market in late 2008.

=== Modern adult contemporary (2010–2016) ===
On December 27, 2010, at 3 p.m., KWJZ changed its format to a hybrid of AAA and modern AC as "Click 98.9." Click's first song was "Animal" by Neon Trees. On March 15, 2011, KWJZ changed its call letters to KLCK-FM to reflect its brand name.

Following Mediabase's addition of the station on the alternative rock panel, the station switched to alternative rock in November 2011, though it still leaned toward AAA. Unlike other alternative stations, Click also aired some dance music, such as Martin Solveig's "Hello" and Maroon 5's "Moves Like Jagger." By that December, the station began to include some hot AC material, such as Kelly Clarkson and Daughtry (primarily artists from sister adult contemporary radio station KRWM), but still retained its modern rock direction, reporting to Mediabase's alternative rock panel.

By March 2012, the station switched to hot adult contemporary per Mediabase reports, joining adult top 40 station KPLZ-FM, though KLCK-FM would shift back towards modern AC by mid-2014. In July 2013, Sandusky announced it would sell its radio holdings in Seattle and Phoenix to Hubbard Broadcasting. The sale was completed that November.

During the latter part of the "Click" years, ratings for the station were continually ranked low, averaging about a high 1 to a low 2 share of the Seattle market, as the station was unable to compete against KPLZ, KNDD, KBKS and KYNW. (In the January 2015 Nielsen PPM ratings report for the market, KLCK was ranked No. 19 with a 1.9 share). In addition, the station consistently tweaked its music direction and had a frequent airstaff turnover.

=== Rock (2016–2017) ===
On March 11, 2016, at noon, after playing "Grapevine Fires" by Bellingham band Death Cab for Cutie, KLCK began stunting with a "Wheel of Formats," changing playlists every 6 hours at 6 a.m., noon, 6 p.m., and midnight. The formats consisted of all-Frank Sinatra, all-Eagles, all-Garth Brooks, opera/showtunes/musical soundtracks, all-Billy Joel, all-Elvis, all-Red Hot Chili Peppers/Foo Fighters, TV show theme songs, all-Neil Diamond, all-Madonna, all-AC/DC, all-Elton John, all-Beatles, prank phone calls from sister KQMV's show "Brooke & Jubal in the Morning", and all-Led Zeppelin.

There were rumors that the station was planning a format change to all sports as "98.9 The Score" or "Sports 98.9." (A Facebook page was even made for the latter branding, as well as one for "98.9 Real Conservative Radio" to throw speculators off the trail, with the pages taken down shortly after.) The station's website was replaced with quotes from historical figures and lyrics from songs such as The Beatles' "In My Life," Elvis Presley's "Heartbreak Hotel" and Garth Brooks' "Unanswered Prayers," as well as floating question mark bubbles which, when clicked on, either played a female computerized voice soundbite stating "Hey, don't touch that," "What is going on?" "This is strange," or "That tickles"; some clicks would also trigger a Rickroll. In addition, Hubbard requested the call sign KVRQ for the station, which was approved on March 15. Program Director Lisa Adams, morning host Jerry Potter, and midday host Megan Lee all exited with the change.

At noon on March 16, 2016, the station flipped to rock as Rock 98-9, launching with a 12,000-song commercial-free marathon, beginning with "In Bloom" by Nirvana. It also changed its call letters to KVRQ to match the new branding. The new station would be positioned between competitors KZOK-FM and KISW, featuring a mix of classic and contemporary rock hits. In September 2016, former KISW personality Jeetz joined KVRQ as an afternoon host. After eschewing a morning show since the launch, KVRQ added the syndicated Billy Madison Show from KISS-FM/San Antonio in April 2017.

=== Country (2017–2023) ===
On December 4, 2017, at 10:44 a.m., KVRQ abruptly dropped the rock format mid-song and flipped to country as Country 98-9; the change came after long-time country station KMPS flipped to soft adult contemporary earlier in the morning (after having briefly switched to all-Christmas music upon the completion of CBS Radio's merger with Entercom, the owner of competing country station KKWF). Its call letters were changed to KNUC on February 6, 2018.

On April 3, 2018, the station rebranded as 98-9 The Bull.

=== Return to AAA (2023–2024) ===
On February 8, 2023, country radio news outlet Country Aircheck and fellow radio news outlet RadioInsight both reported the station had filed with the FCC to change call letters to KPNW-FM effective February 14; the change required consent from Bicoastal Media, owner of KPNW in Eugene, Oregon. Hubbard Seattle VP/Market Manager Trip Reeb told Country Aircheck that the change was connected to the rollout of a new "Country for the PNW" tagline; no such liners were used at the time.

At 9 a.m. on February 14, 2023, after concluding that day's broadcast of The Bobby Bones Show and playing "The Cowboy Rides Away" by George Strait, the station, under the new KPNW-FM callsign, flipped back to an adult album alternative format, with David Bowie's "Changes" as the first song; the change put the station in competition with KEXP-FM and KNDD. KPNW-FM was the first commercial AAA station in Seattle since KMTT dropped the format in 2013.

=== Return to Country (2024–present) ===
The AAA format proved to be a massive failure during its existence, carrying only a 0.8 share in the January 2024 Nielsen Audio market ratings, and partially triggered a massive increase for those of KKWF, which was second in the ratings with a 7.1 share that month. On April 1, 2024, at 10 a.m., after signing off the AAA format with "It's the End of the World as We Know It" by R.E.M, the station reverted back to its prior country format as The Bull; the first song under the relaunched format was "Like I Love Country Music" by Kane Brown. The move was claimed by Hubbard to be driven by listener demand, and had been moved up from an unrevealed later date as retaliation to a similar format change on KPLZ that occurred just four hours later. With the move, former morning host Fitz, who was with the previous iteration until leaving in 2020, returns to the same timeslot. The station's call letters took a new focus and were retained, taking on the "Country for the PNW" tagline that was originally used as a ruse before the 2023 flip.

== HD Radio ==
- HD2 carries a Classic country format as 1150 AM and 98.9 HD2 The Bull Classics, simulcasting on KKNW.
