= KWYZ =

- Everett, Washington; United States
- Broadcast area: Seattle metropolitan area
- Frequency: 1230 kHz
- Branding: Radio Hankook

Programming
- Language: Korean
- Format: K-pop; news

Ownership
- Owner: Radio Hankook, Inc.
- Sister stations: KSUH

History
- First air date: July 21, 1957
- Former call signs: KQTY (1957–1962)

Technical information
- Licensing authority: FCC
- Facility ID: 54040
- Class: C
- Power: 1,000 watts (unlimited)
- Transmitter coordinates: 47°58′5.3″N 122°10′28.5″W
- Translator: (102.1 MHz) K271CS (Everett)

Links
- Public license information: Public file; LMS
- Website: www.radiohankook.com

KWYZ (1230 kHz) is a U.S. radio station licensed to serve Everett, Washington. The station, which began broadcasting in 1957, is owned by Radio Hankook, Inc. Jean J. Suh, the owner of Radio Hankook, is a pioneer in Korean-language radio programming in the United States.

== Programming ==
KWYZ broadcasts a mix of Korean language programming to the northern Seattle metropolitan area in a simulcast partnership with KSUH (1450 AM). In addition to South Korean popular music (also known as "K-pop"), Radio Hankook airs up to six hours of daily talk radio programming, including local and South Korean news, information for recently-arrived immigrants from South Korea, and community affairs. Other programming includes a program for children in both Korean and English plus a short twice-daily show for all ages that aims to teach basic English language skills.

== History ==
=== Launch as KQTY ===
This station signed on the air on July 21, 1957, as KQTY (pronounced cutie) broadcasting with 250 watts of power on a frequency of 1230 kHz. KQTY was originally licensed to the Snohomish County Broadcasting Company which, along with stations in California, North Dakota, and Montana, was part of the Walter N. "Wally" Nelskog stations group. In 1960, the station was granted a construction permit by the FCC to increase its daytime signal power to 1,000 watts while maintaining a 250 watt signal at night.

=== Change to KWYZ ===
On April 1, 1962, the station was acquired by the Snohomish County Broadcasting Corporation, with Cliff Hansen as president and George Aller as vice president. The new owners had the FCC change the station's call sign to KWYZ. This situation remained stable until February 16, 1972, when the Snohomish County Broadcasting Corporation was acquired by Robert Brown. In June 1974, the new owners dropped the station's middle of the road music format in favor of country music. In May 1975, Brown changed the name of the license holder to Prime Time Broadcasting, Inc.

=== Money troubles ===
Facing a petition to deny its license renewal and a financial crisis, the broadcast license for KWYZ was involuntarily transferred in November 1991 from Prime Time Broadcasting, Inc., to Richard D. Carlson acting as receiver. The transfer was approved by the FCC on November 14, 1991. In June 1992, receiver Richard D. Carlson reached an agreement to sell this station to Quality Broadcasting Corporation. The deal was approved by the FCC on March 29, 1993, and the transaction was consummated on June 28, 1994.

=== KWYZ today ===
In March 1999, Quality Broadcasting Corporation agreed to sell KWYZ to Jean J. Suh, doing business as Radio Hankook, for a reported price of $480,000. The deal was approved by the FCC on April 27, 1999, and the transaction was consummated on August 3, 1999. Until this deal was consummated, KWYZ maintained its traditional country music format. Suh applied to the FCC in October 2002 to transfer the broadcast license for this station to her company, Radio Hancook, Inc. The transfer was approved by the FCC on November 15, 2002, and the transaction was consummated on December 1, 2003.

Jean J. Suh worked for five years as a radio actress at South Korea's Korean Broadcasting System before emigrating to the United States in 1964. While studying at Columbia College Hollywood in 1965, Suh began hosting a 30-minute weekly program of music and news in Korean at a Los Angeles radio station. In 1966 the program was extended to one hour per week and in 1967 to two hours each weekday. In 1970, Suh and two financial partners launched an independent Korean-language radio station in Los Angeles, the first in the United States. Suh purchased KKBY (1450 AM, now KSUH) in 1997 and KWYZ in 1999 to cover the southern and northern halves of the greater Seattle metropolitan area, respectively, as Korean-language "Radio Hankook".

== Controversy ==
=== Hiring practices ===
In January 1991, the National Association for the Advancement of Colored People challenged the license renewal of KWYZ and five other Seattle-area radio stations. The NAACP claimed each of the stations had "poor minority-hiring records" and were in violation of equal employment opportunity laws. The FCC ultimately renewed KWYZ's license on March 29, 1993—just 2 days short of 30 months after the license renewal application was made and then only after the station had gone into receivership and been sold to new owners.

=== Studio location ===
Faced with mounting debts and financial difficulties, Radio Hankook owner Jean J. Suh moved KWYZ and sister station KSUH out of their rented studios in a commercial area of Federal Way, Washington, to her private residence in May 2000. This move brought on complaints from neighbors, visits from city code enforcement officers, and a public campaign by Radio Hankook to force the city to allow the studios to remain in Suh's home. Ultimately, the city prevailed over increasing community resistance and the stations moved out of the home in late April 2001.

=== FCC issues ===
During a series of inspections conducted by FCC agents from March 2001 to November 2001, they found that KWYZ had failed to "have operational Emergency Alert System (EAS) equipment" and "to conduct required monthly and weekly EAS tests" and had failed to "post the ASR number on or near the base of" its broadcast tower in violation of FCC rules as well as finding similar violations by sister station KSUH. After a January 2002 notice of these violations, licensee Jean J. Suh told the FCC that the station had modified its EAS equipment for automatic operation and that she did not own the KSUH tower but was leasing it from the station's previous license holder. The FCC issued a "notice of apparent liability" against Suh for violations by KWYZ and KSUH on August 28, 2002, for a combined total of $22,000. After determining that Suh did not in fact own the KSUH tower, they reduced the penalty to $10,000 in late August 2003.
