= WEAQ =

Coordinates: 44°53′05″N 91°23′25″W

- Chippewa Falls, Wisconsin; United States
- Broadcast area: Eau Claire, Wisconsin; Menomonie, Wisconsin
- Frequency: 1150 kHz
- Branding: The Farm

Programming
- Format: Classic Country/Ag News

Ownership
- Owner: Mid-West Family Broadcasting; (Clear Water Brands, Inc.)
- Sister stations: WAXX, WAYY, WIAL, WECL, WISM-FM

History
- First air date: 1937 (as WEAU at 1050)
- Former call signs: WEAU (1937–1959)
- Former frequencies: 1050 kHz (1937–1941); 790 kHz (1941–1996)
- Call sign meaning: "Eau Claire"

Technical information
- Licensing authority: FCC
- Facility ID: 9865
- Class: D
- Power: 5,000 watts day 46 watts night
- Translator: 95.9 W240DC (Chippewa Falls)

Links
- Public license information: Public file; LMS
- Webcast: Listen Live
- Website: www.thefarmec.com

WEAQ (1150 AM) is a radio station in the Eau Claire area of Wisconsin, with its studio and offices located in Altoona, Wisconsin. Its transmitter is located in Lake Hallie, Wisconsin.

== History ==
The station was originally WEAU on 1050 kHz, switching to 790 in 1941. The call sign was switched to WEAQ upon a 1959 ownership change.

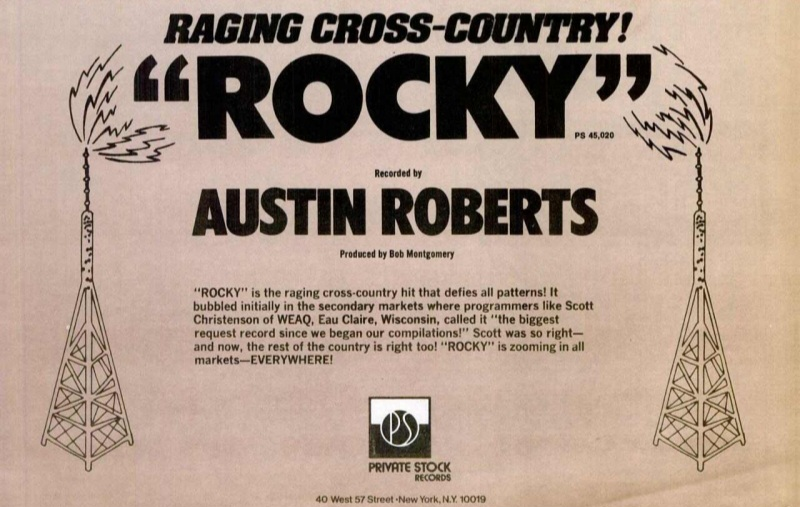
Trade ad for Austin Roberts' 1975 single "Rocky", with mention of its airplay on WEAQ

Eventually, the station moved to Tower Drive on the northeast side of Eau Claire, playing pop music with occasional format switches to country, rock, adult contemporary and standards. WEAQ converted to sports talk in April 2002 with a near-full simulcast of ESPN Radio, and the rebranding as "ESPN 1150."

WEAQ and sister stations WIAL & WECL were purchased by Central Communications in 1996. On October 7th, 1996, WAYY 1150 and WEAQ switched frequencies, with WEAQ now at 1150. WEAQ, WIAL & WECL soon moved into the Central Communications building in Altoona, Wisconsin. The five stations, plus new sister station WDRK, were sold to Maverick Media, LLC in 2003.

WEAQ and its Eau Claire sister stations, along with Maverick Media's Rockford, Illinois stations, were sold to Mid-West Family Broadcasting for $15.5 million. The purchase of the Eau Claire stations was consummated on October 1, 2013, while the Rockford station purchases were consummated on June 1, 2014.

On April 28, 2014, WEAQ changed its format to oldies, branded as "Oldies 1150".

On March 14, 2017, after playing "Then You Can Tell Me Goodbye" by The Casinos, WEAQ flipped to Rhythmic CHR as "95.9 Jamz", utilizing new FM translator W240DC. The first song on the new format was "Party" by Chris Brown. The station featured no DJs, promoting itself as the home for "nonstop music without all the talk".

On May 19, 2022, the FM translator antenna moved to a new tower at an elevation of 285 feet above ground.

On January 3, 2024, WEAQ flipped to country, along with agriculture news coverage, and rebranded as "The Farm". The new format mirrors Madison sister station WHIT.
