= WAYY =

Coordinates: 44°49′51″N 91°26′58″W

- Eau Claire, Wisconsin; United States
- Frequency: 790 kHz
- Branding: Sports Talk 105.1

Programming
- Format: Sports
- Affiliations: Infinity Sports Network; Milwaukee Brewers Radio Network; Milwaukee Bucks Radio Network

Ownership
- Owner: Mid-West Family Broadcasting; (Clear Water Brands, Inc.)
- Sister stations: WAXX, WEAQ, WECL, WIAL, WISM-FM

History
- First air date: November 18, 1954; 71 years ago
- Former call signs: WCHF (1954-1958); WAXX (1958-1978)
- Former frequencies: 1150 kHz (1954–1996)
- Call sign meaning: sister station of WAXX-FM ("YY" alphabetical after "XX")

Technical information
- Licensing authority: FCC
- Facility ID: 7062
- Class: B
- Power: 5,000 watts day 123 watts night
- Translator: 105.1 W286CK (Eau Claire)

Links
- Public license information: Public file; LMS
- Webcast: Listen Live
- Website: wayyradio.com

WAYY (790 AM) is a commercial radio station in Eau Claire, Wisconsin. It broadcasts a sports radio format and is owned by Mid-West Family Broadcasting. Programming is mostly from Infinity Sports Network. It also carries Milwaukee Brewers baseball and Milwaukee Bucks basketball. The radio studios and offices are in Altoona, Wisconsin.

By day, WAYY transmits with 5,000 watts non-directional. But to protect other stations on 790 AM from interference, it reduces power at night to 123 watts. (For most of its history, WAYY ran 5,000 watts around the clock, using a directional antenna at night with multiple towers. But as the economy moved, those extra towers were sold off, and nighttime power was reduced.) WAYY's transmitter is on Black Avenue at Tower Drive in Seymour, Wisconsin. Programming is also heard on 185-watt FM translator W286CK at 105.1 MHz in Eau Claire.

== History ==
In November 1954, the station signed on as WCHF, changing its call letters to WAXX in September 1958. In its early years, it was on 1150 kHz. The station played current middle-of-the-road music (MOR), then converted to country music in 1966. In the 1960s, WAXX was bought by the same company that owned WEAU-TV/WEAU-FM, and the country format was simulcast on WEAU-FM, renamed WAXX-FM in 1977. In February 1978, WAXX was rebranded as WAYY and began playing an oldies format. After several format modifications, WAYY went to talk radio in January 1991.

WAYY & WAXX were sold to Central Communications in 1984 and moved into their new building (and current home) behind WEAU-TV in 1985. Following the acquisition of WEAQ 790 in 1996, the two AM stations switched frequencies on October 7th, 1996, with WAYY now at 790 on the AM dial. WAYY, WAXX, WEAQ, and sister stations WIAL, WECL and WDRK were sold to Maverick Media, LLC in 2003.

WAYY and its Eau Claire sister stations, along with Maverick Media's Rockford, Illinois stations, were sold to Mid-West Family Broadcasting for $15.5 million. The purchase of the Eau Claire stations was consummated on October 1, 2013, while the Rockford station purchases were consummated on June 1, 2014.

On April 28, 2014, WAYY changed its format to sports, with programming from CBS Sports Radio.

On July 27, 2016, WAYY began simulcasting on FM translator W286CK 105.1 FM Eau Claire.

== Previous logos ==
WAYY logo 2003-2014

WAYY logo 2014-16

WAYY logo 2016-2017
