= WECL =

Radio station in Lake Hallie, Wisconsin

- Lake Hallie, Wisconsin; United States
- Broadcast area: Eau Claire-Chippewa Falls
- Frequency: 92.9 MHz
- Branding: 92.9 The X

Programming
- Format: Active rock

Ownership
- Owner: Mid-West Family Broadcasting; (Clear Water Brands, Inc.)
- Sister stations: WAXX, WAYY, WEAQ, WIAL, WISM-FM

History
- First air date: January 24, 1991
- Call sign meaning: Eau Claire

Technical information
- Licensing authority: FCC
- Facility ID: 64011
- Class: A
- ERP: 3,300 watts
- HAAT: 136 meters (446 ft)
- Transmitter coordinates: 44°53′4″N 91°35′4″W

Links
- Public license information: Public file; LMS
- Webcast: Listen Live
- Website: 929thex.com

WECL (92.9 FM, "The X") is an active rock formatted broadcast radio station licensed to Lake Hallie, Wisconsin, serving the Eau Claire/Chippewa Falls area. WECL is owned and operated by Mid-West Family Broadcasting.

== History ==
The station originally aired an adult contemporary format. When it was purchased by Midwest Family Communications that owned WIAL and WEAQ, it switched to an oldies format, becoming "Oldies 92.9" on January 1, 1995. The station also moved from the near the Menards Shopping Center on the northwest side of Eau Claire to Tower Drive on the northeast side. The station slogan was later changed to "Cool 92.9"

WECL, WIAL and WEAQ were sold to Central Communications (consisting of WAXX and WAYY) in 1996, and moved into the Central studios in Altoona, Wisconsin. The five stations, plus new sister station WDRK, were sold to Maverick Media, LLC in 2003.

WECL switched to a classic rock format branded as "Classic Rock 92.9 ECL" on March 1, 2004. The station adopted the moniker "92.9 The Big Cheese - The Station That Rocks" in September 2005, and a new mouse logo shortly thereafter. In September 2012, the moniker was revised to "92.9 The Big Cheese Rocks" and a new logo was unveiled on November 30 of that year.

WECL and its Eau Claire sister stations were sold to Mid-West Family Broadcasting for $15.5 million, taking effect on October 1, 2013.

Two days after the sale closed, on October 3, 2013, at 11:58 p.m., after playing Again by Alice in Chains, WECL began stunting with nonstop Metallica songs, beginning with Fade to Black. Three days later, on October 7, at 12:00 a.m., after playing The Unforgiven II, WECL switched to an Active Rock format as "92-9 The X". The first song played on "The X" was American Idiot by Green Day.

== Previous logos ==
WECL logo 1991-1994

WECL logo circa 1997-2004

WAYY logo 2005-2012

WECL logo 2012-2013
