= WAXX =

Coordinates: 44.6641°N 90.9615°W

- Eau Claire, Wisconsin; United States
- Broadcast area: Eau Claire-Chippewa Falls/La Crosse
- Frequency: 104.5 MHz
- Branding: Today's WAXX 104.5 (pronounced as the word "wax")

Programming
- Language: English
- Format: Country

Ownership
- Owner: Mid-West Family Broadcasting; (Clear Water Brands, Inc.)
- Sister stations: WAYY, WEAQ, WECL, WIAL, WISM-FM

History
- First air date: 1965
- Former call signs: WEAU-FM (1965-77)
- Call sign meaning: stacks of "waxx" (vinyl records)

Technical information
- Licensing authority: FCC
- Facility ID: 9866
- Class: C
- ERP: 100,000 watts
- HAAT: 549 meters (1,801 ft)
- Transmitter coordinates: 44° 39' 51.00" N 90° 57' 41.00" W

Links
- Public license information: Public file; LMS
- Webcast: Listen Live
- Website: waxxradio.com

WAXX (104.5 FM) is a radio station in the Eau Claire area of Wisconsin, with its studio/offices located in Altoona, Wisconsin. Its transmitter is located in Fairchild, Wisconsin, sharing the tower with WEAU.

== History ==
The station was originally WEAU-FM, an FM station co-owned with WEAU-TV in Eau Claire, broadcasting on 100.7 FM until 1967 when it switched to 104.5 FM. When WAXX 1150 was purchased and brought under the same ownership as WEAU-TV/WEAU-FM, WEAU-FM began simulcasting WAXX's country format. In September 1977, WEAU-FM's call letters were changed to WAXX-FM, and eventually the country format was aired exclusively on the FM dial (WAXX was renamed WAYY in 1978 and changed formats to oldies, eventually settling on news/talk in 1991, and later sports/talk in 2014).

WAXX & WAYY were sold to Central Communications in 1984, and moved into their new building (and current home) behind WEAU-TV in 1985. WAXX, WAYY and new sister stations WIAL-FM, WEAQ, WECL-FM & WDRK-FM were sold to Maverick Media, LLC in 2003.

WAXX was the first radio station in the Eau Claire market to broadcast live 24 hours a day on the Internet, beginning March 31, 2006.

WAXX has been awarded several NAB Marconi Radio Awards over the years, including "Small Market Station of the Year" in both 2000 and 2007.

WAXX's "Alex & Cora" Morning won the Wisconsin Broadcaster's Award for best Medium Market Morning Show in Wisconsin in 2013. The Morning Show was also nominated for a Marconi Award for the Best Small Market Morning Show in America in 2013.

WAXX signature voice is John Willyard, voice of the CMA Awards since 1996, whose signature voice work is heard on many notable Country stations across North America.

On the evening of Tuesday, March 22, 2011, the 2,000-foot tower near Fairchild, Wisconsin, carrying WAXX's signal collapsed. The station had to broadcast at low power using a tower next to their studios that only reached the Eau Claire / Chippewa Falls metro area until its main tower was rebuilt; the station also was broadcasting for the Spencer/Marshfield area also on 104.5. WAXX programming was temporarily carried on WECL 92.9 for several days after the collapse, displacing that station's programming. Early in the afternoon of Friday, January 27, 2012, WAXX-FM started transmitting from a new tower at the Fairchild site, at the same height as the previous collapsed tower.

WAXX and its Eau Claire sister stations, along with Maverick Media's Rockford, Illinois stations, were sold to Mid-West Family Broadcasting for $15.5 million. The purchase of the Eau Claire stations was consummated on October 1, 2013, while the Rockford station purchases were consummated on June 1, 2014.

== Previous logos ==
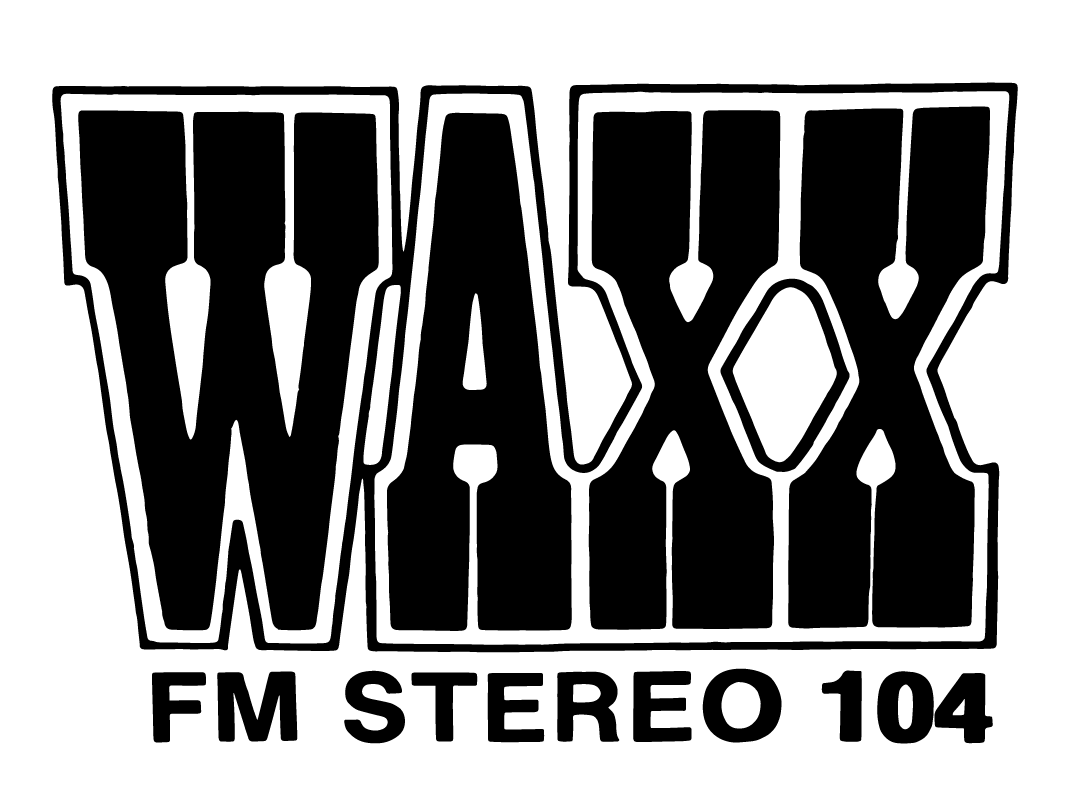
WAXX logo early-1970s to circa-1985.

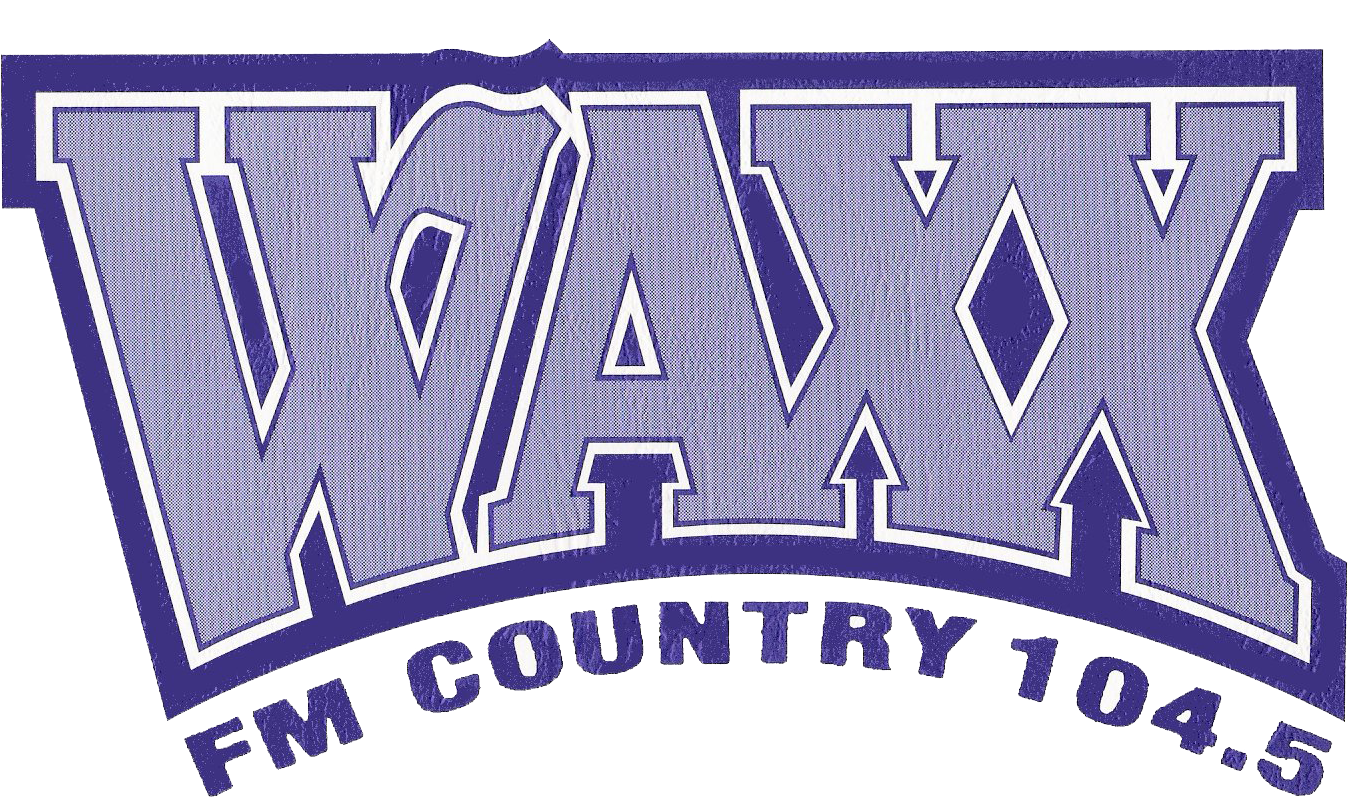
WAXX logo circa-1985 to circa-1997.

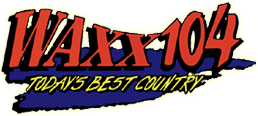
WAXX logo circa-1997 to circa-2005.

WAXX logo 2005 to 2021
