= Tradition Lake =

Lake in Issaquah, Washington

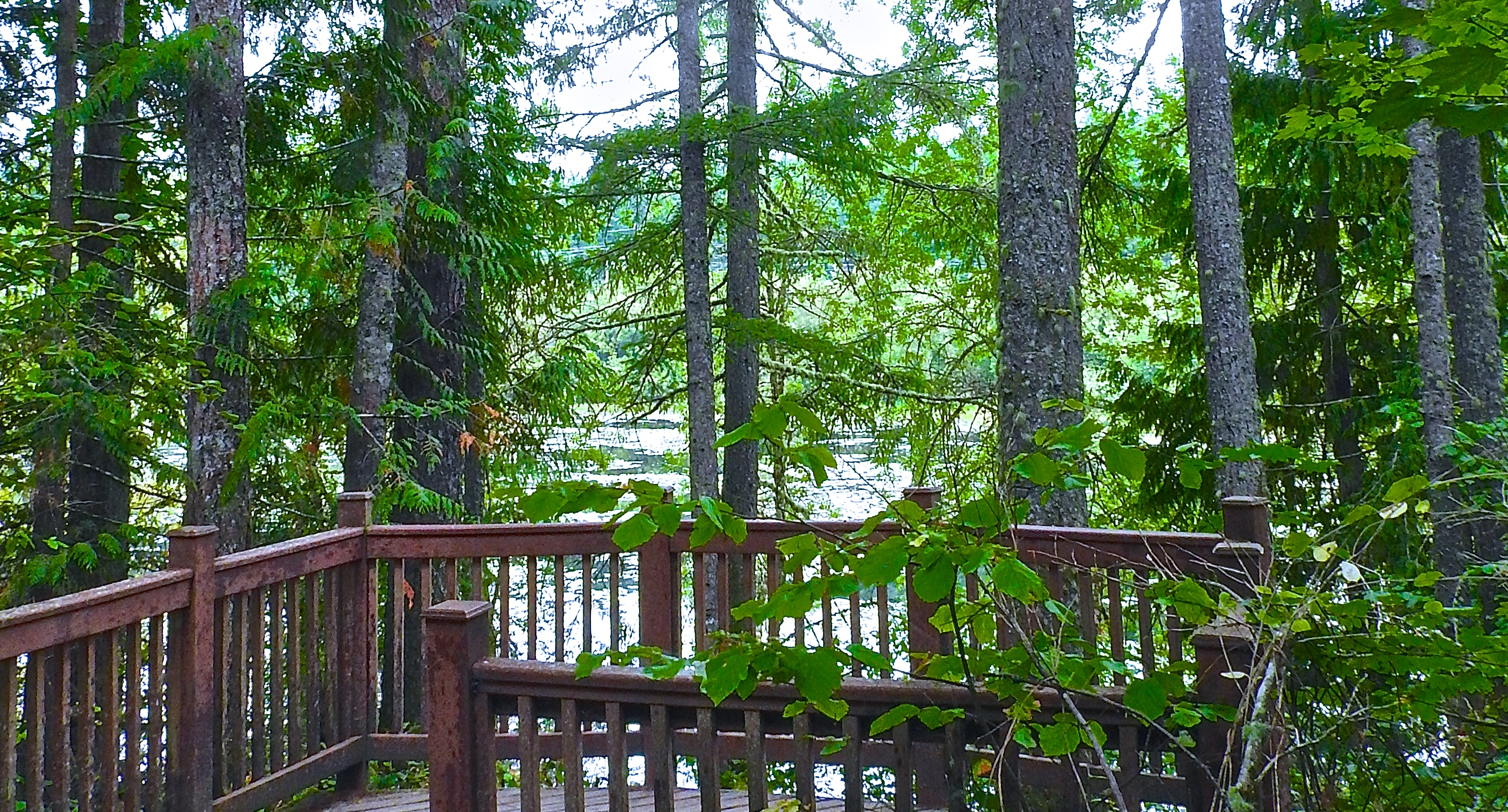
- Tradition Lake from a viewing platform

- Location within Washington (state) Location within the United States
- Location: Issaquah, Washington
- Coordinates: 47.528743°N 122.003832°W
- Basin countries: United States
- Surface area: 17.40 acres (7.04 ha)
- Surface elevation: 471 ft (144 m)

Tradition Lake is located at the base of Tiger Mountain in Issaquah, Washington. There is a popular interpretive trail around the lake.

== Geography ==
Tradition Lake is located on the northwestern edge of Tiger Mountain, one of the Issaquah Alps. The lake and surrounding wetlands are part of the West Tiger Mountain Natural Resources Conservation Area, managed by the Washington State Department of Natural Resources. The lake drains the slopes of the mountain through several streams. However, it has no outlet streams and instead drains into the aquifer. The city of Issaquah once used the lake for drinking water, and remnants of this infrastructure are still visible along I-90.

== Hiking trails ==
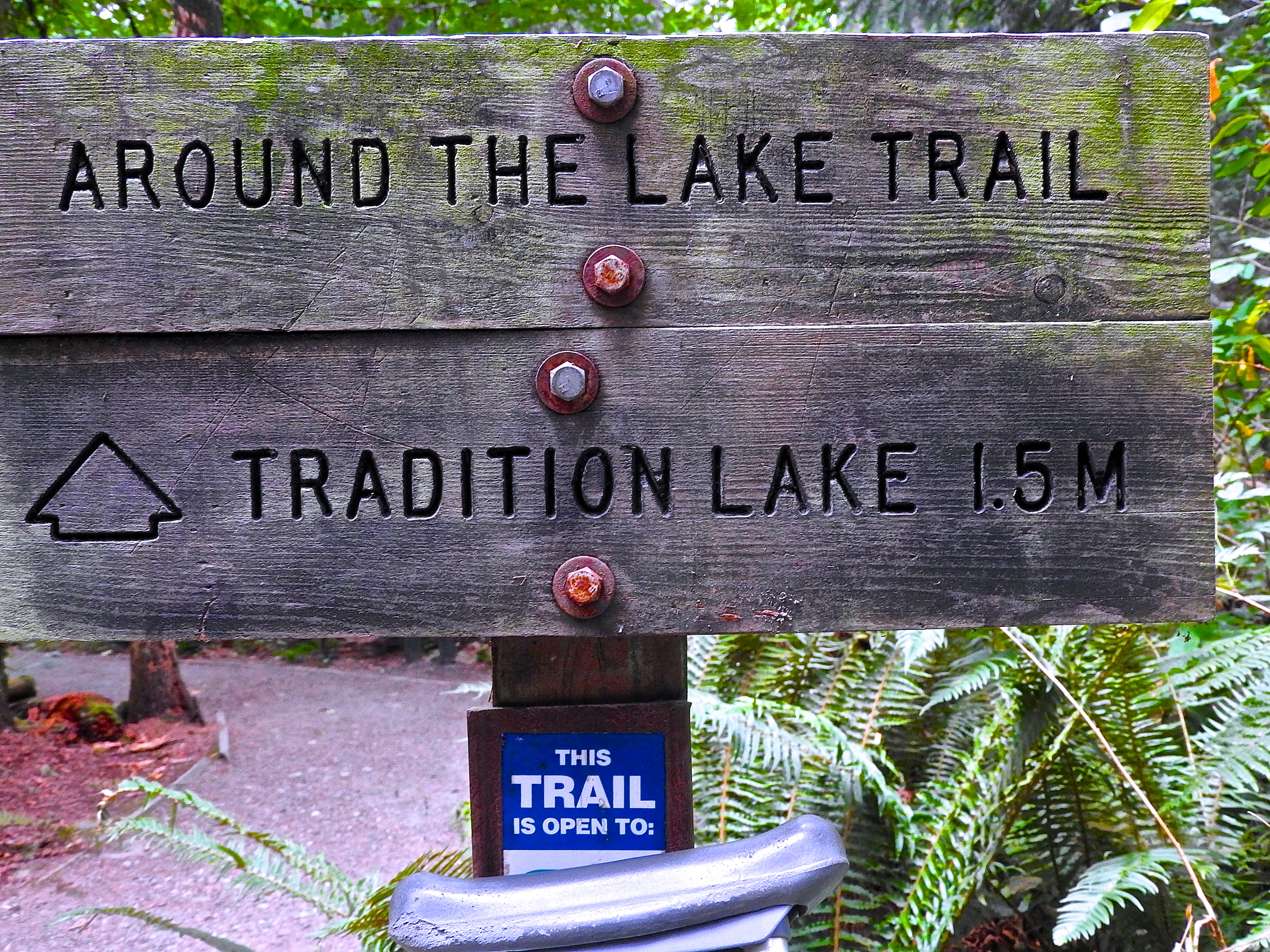
Sign for the trail

The main access to the lake is via the popular Around the Lake Trail. This interpretive trail encircles the lake and provides several viewing opportunities. The loop begins at the High Point trailhead, just off I-90. It has many interpretive signs about the area's diverse wildlife.

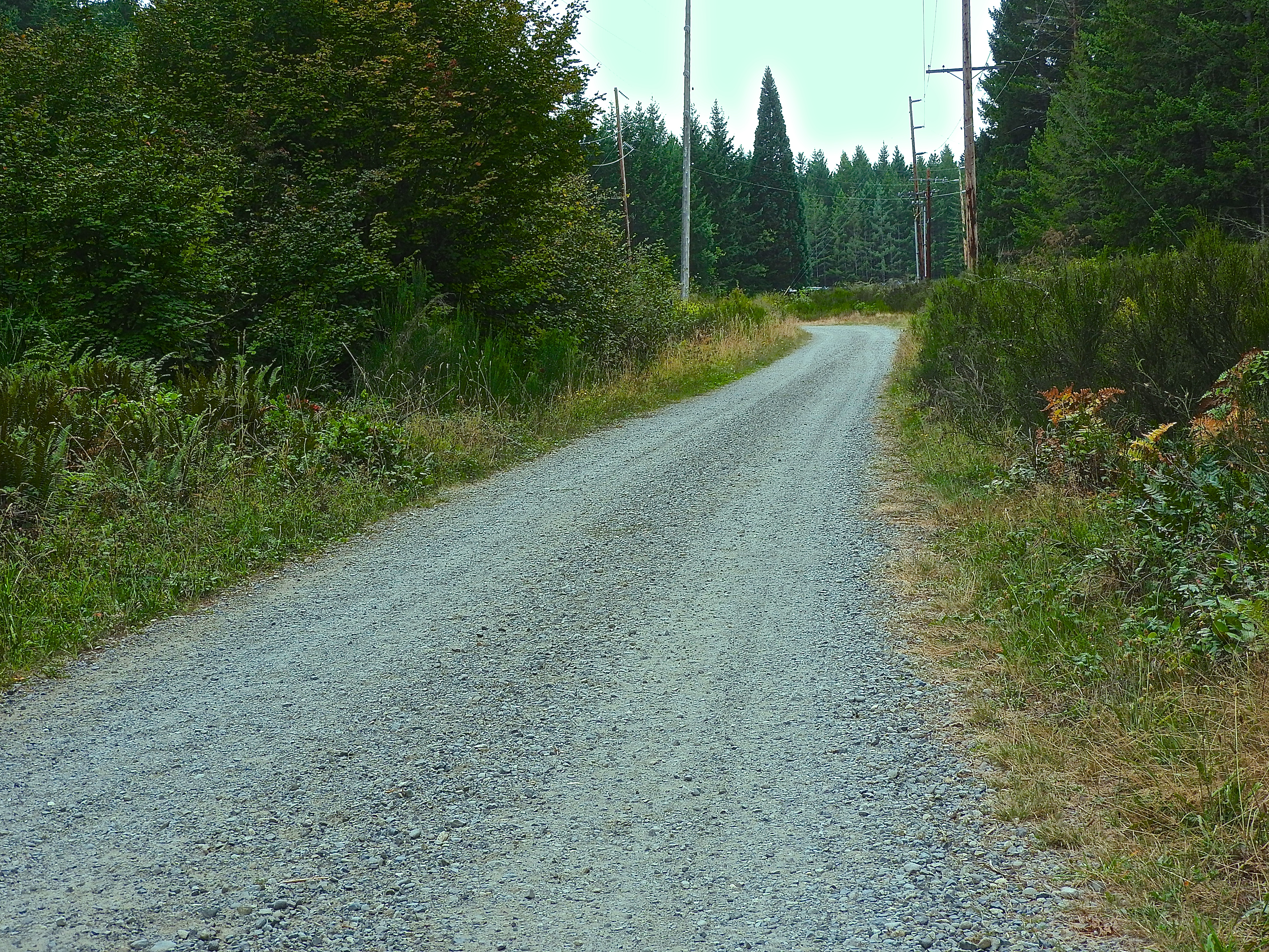
Power lines and trail

The loop continues as a Puget Sound Energy power line easement trail. These electric power transmission lead to the nearby Tradition Lake substation.

The small Round Lake is located nearby, further to the west.

A popular destination near the trail is an abandoned bus, located on the eponymous bus trail. The bus was originally used for logging, but was later abandoned. The engine and tires were salvaged, and it now stands as a metal frame.

== Fishing ==
The lake allows fishing, but the shoreline is quite undeveloped. Largemouth bass and yellow perch can be caught throughout the year.
