= Cedar Butte =

Cedar Butte may refer to:

- Cedar Butte Township, Adams County, North Dakota
- Cedar Butte Township, Pennington County, South Dakota
- Cedar Butte, South Dakota, an unincorporated community in Mellette County
- Cedar Butte (Washington)
