= Issaquah Highlands =

Planned community in Issaquah, Washington, US

Coordinates: 47°32′54″N 121°59′47″W

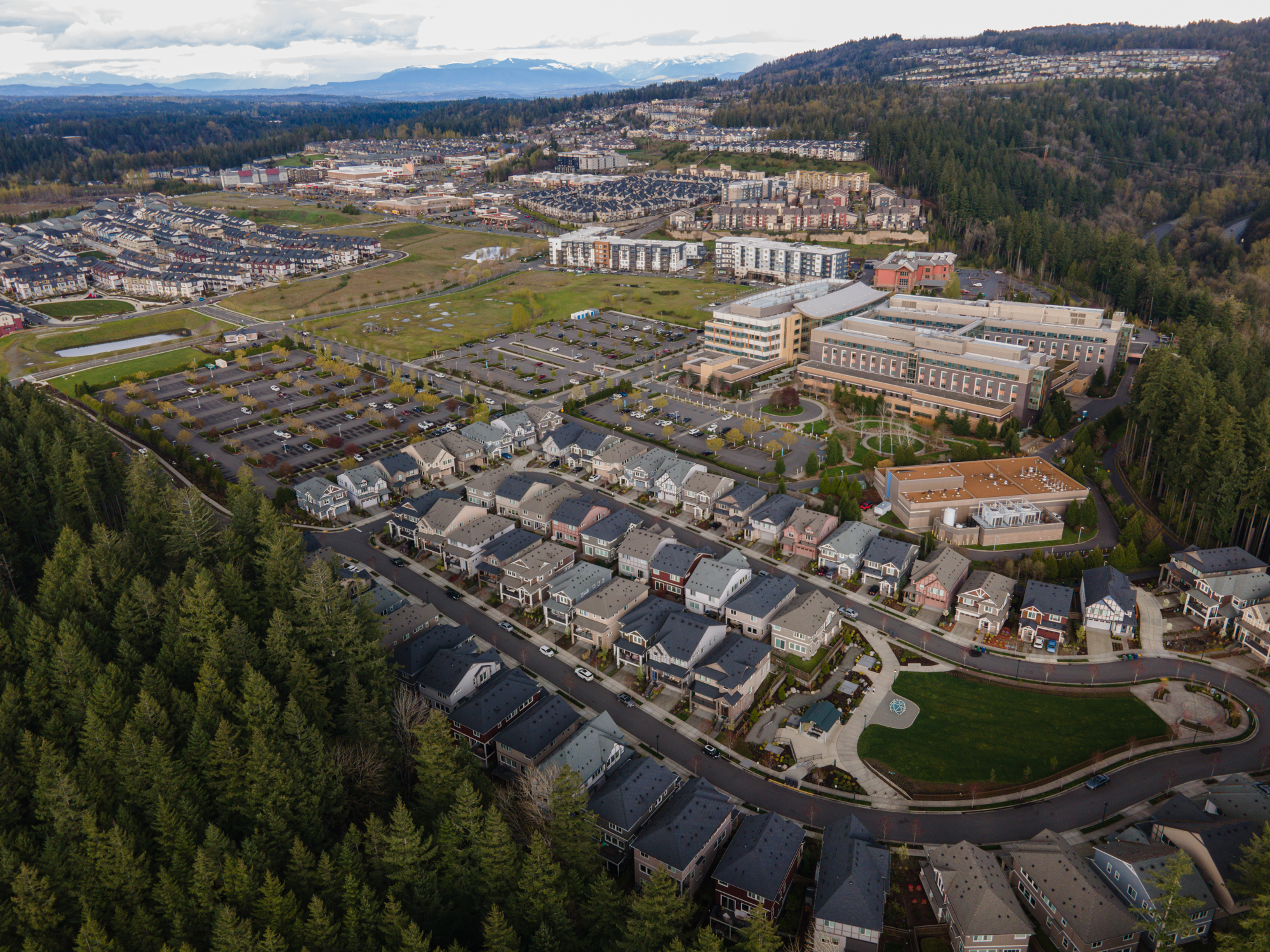
Aerial view of Issaquah Highlands

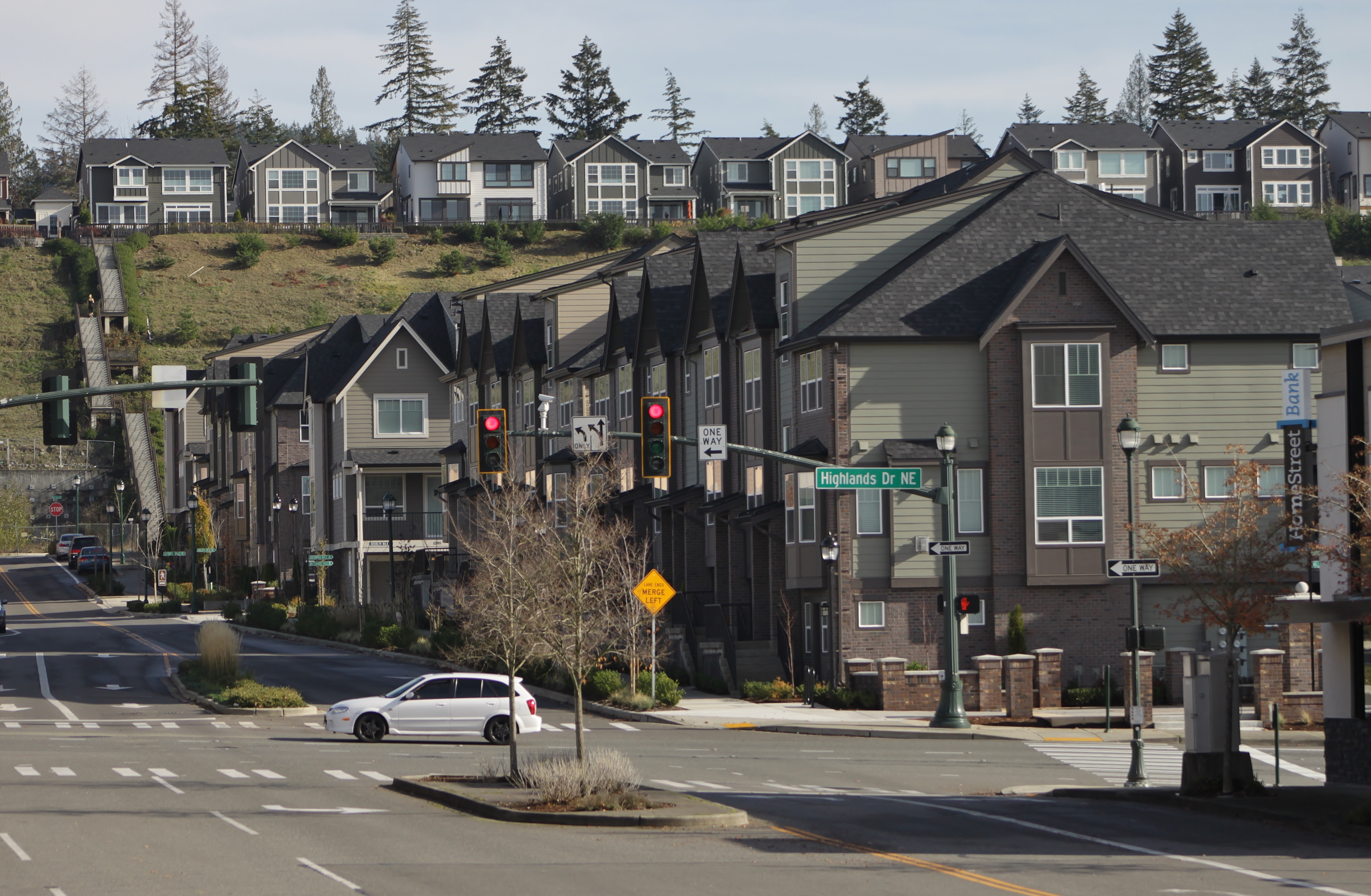
Looking east on Ellis Drive towards apartments and single-family homes in Issaquah Highlands

Issaquah Highlands is a planned community and mixed-use neighborhood in Issaquah, a suburb of Seattle, Washington, United States. The neighborhood, located northeast of downtown Issaquah at Grand Ridge on the Sammamish Plateau, was planned in the New Urbanism style and opened in 1998 after a decade of planning and construction.

The Issaquah Highlands occupy 2,200 acres (890 ha), of which 490 acres (200 ha) are incorporated into the city and 1,520 acres (620 ha) are preserved as public open space. It plans to have approximately 3,250 residential units, 2.95 million square feet (274,000 m^{2}) of commercial space, and 425,000 square feet (39,500 m^{2}) of retail space upon full build-out. The neighborhood has an approximate population of 9,000 people as of 2015.

== History ==
The Pine Lake Plateau, like most of the Eastside region, was a productive coal harvesting area in the early 20th century. The Grand Ridge Mine, located north of Issaquah at the future site of the Issaquah Highlands, was in operation from 1909 to 1934 and sporadically produced coal until its full closure in the 1950s. The heavily forested area was partially turned into an undeveloped park by the King County government in the 1960s, and was sought after as a site for suburban development in the late 1970s. The 738-acre (299 ha) county park was acquired by developer Glacier Park in a land-swap deal for portions of Cougar Mountain and Ravensdale.

Real estate developer Ken Behring, partnering with Port Blakely Tree Farms, acquired the Grand Ridge area from Glacier Park in May 1990. He planned to build 6,000 homes on Grand Ridge, which was zoned to support 5-acre (2.0 ha) lots, in a move opposed by county officials and environmentalists. The city of Issaquah considered annexation of the entire East Sammamish Plateau in 1990, including the Grand Ridge area, but was stopped by the King County Boundary Review Board in June of that year.

A new plan was formed in 1992 by Port Blakely Communities, a new division of Port Blakely for real estate development, centered around sustainability and affordability following New Urbanism principles. The King County Council failed to approve the rezoning of Grand Ridge to support housing and commercial development, also rejecting a compromise from County Executive Tim Hill that would allow immediate development on the western edge. An urban growth boundary, required by the Growth Management Act of 1990, was set in 1992 to exclude the Grand Ridge area, preventing further development without county action. Behring pulled out of the partnership in 1993, leaving Port Blakely as the sole developer for Grand Ridge.

In May 1994, new County Executive Gary Locke announced a compromise agreement between the county government and Port Blakely Communities that would allow the development to move forward. The agreement allowed the development of high-density housing, offices and retail on 352 acres (142 ha) of land in exchange for a donation of 1,673 acres (677 ha) for public open space, including parkland and nature reserves. The compromise was approved by the King County Council in December 1995, including 3,950 housing units (of which 60 percent were to be townhomes, condominiums or apartments), retail space, office space, and $33 million in private funding for road improvements.

In early 1996, Port Blakely proposed scrapping the urban village plan after costs increased by $10 million, but was saved by the county accepting responsibility for funding costly road improvements. The Issaquah City Council approved their portion of the Grand Ridge project, including $16.7 million in road funding and annexation of the area, in May 1996. The final agreement between Port Blakely, the county and Issaquah was signed on May 29, 1996, allowing for construction to begin. The site was also briefly considered for a National Football League stadium for the Seattle Seahawks by team owner Paul Allen, who bought the team from Ken Behring.

On September 5, 1996, Port Blakely and the county broke ground on the Grand Ridge development, amid controversy and a picket protest over potential traffic impacts in the area. Port Blakely renamed the Grand Ridge project to "Issaquah Highlands" in April 1997, to better identify with the city of Issaquah. The open space portion of the development was officially accepted by King County in November 1997 and designated as the future home of Grand Ridge Park, to become the fourth-largest in the county parks system at 1,250 acres (510 ha).

The first homes in the Issaquah Highlands were completed in 1998. Development was limited to approximately 1,000 homes until the construction of a new access road and $157 million interchange with Interstate 90 that opened in 2003. The first retailers began moving to the Highlands in 2005, after the development's population reached 3,000 residents.

== Geography ==
Issaquah Highlands is located north of downtown Issaquah on the western half of Grand Ridge, a hill along the southern part of the East Sammamish Plateau. The ridge itself rises over 1,100 feet (340 m) above sea level, with the majority of residential areas around 500 to 800 feet (150 to 240 m) in elevation. The area is bounded to the south by Interstate 90, to the west by East Lake Sammamish Parkway, to the north by Issaquah-Fall City Road, and to the east by the crest of Grand Ridge.

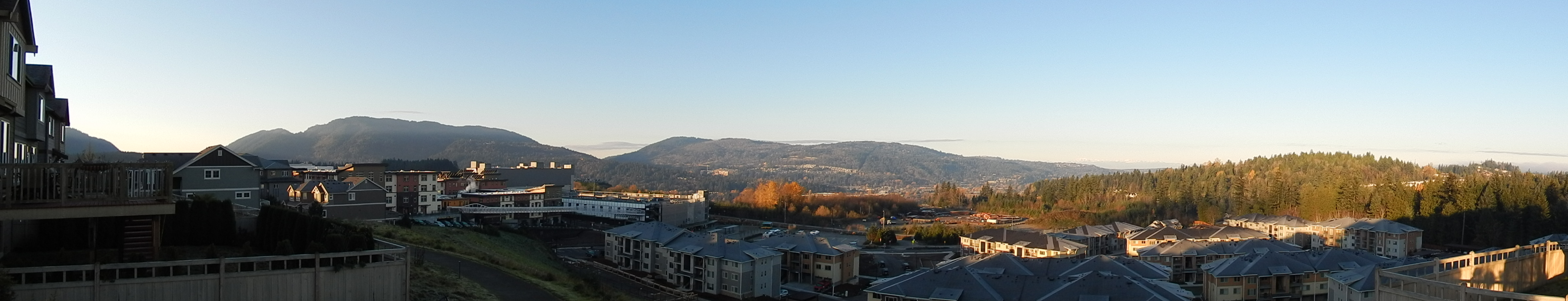
Panorama of Issaquah Highlands, Issaquah Alps in the distance

== Education ==
The Issaquah Highlands has one public school: Grand Ridge Elementary, opened in 2006 and operated by the Issaquah School District. The school was financed in a 1999 bond measure, but its opening was delayed until enough pupils moved into the area to justify its construction. It was named via an online poll of Issaquah residents to reflect the history of the Pine Lake Plateau and the Grand Ridge Mine. Population growth in the neighborhood by 2017 necessitated the busing of 500 students to nearby schools and considerations for a new elementary school. The construction of a new elementary school was approved in a 2016 bond measure and is scheduled to be complete by 2020.

== Economy ==
The Issaquah Highlands development planned to incorporate 2.95 million square feet (274,000 m^{2}) of commercial space and 425,000 square feet (39,500 m^{2}) of retail space in its initial plans. The area's commercial district, located on the western side of Grand Ridge, remained unoccupied and unbuilt until the early 2010s, with Opus Northwest abandoning plans to build mid-rise office-and-retail buildings in 2008. In 2013, the Grand Ridge Plaza and a 12-screen movie theater opened at the Issaquah Highlands, filling the vacant retail area.

Microsoft, based in nearby Redmond, planned to build a campus for 12,000 employees on 150 acres (61 ha) it acquired in 1997. The campus was reduced to 63 acres (25 ha) after the company was given approval to expand its existing Redmond campus, and Microsoft sold its remaining property in the Issaquah Highlands in 2013 for $54 million.

== Infrastructure ==
=== Hospitals ===
Swedish Medical Center opened an 80-bed, $365 million hospital at the southwest corner of Issaquah Highlands in 2011. Swedish originally competed with Overlake Hospital Medical Center to build a hospital at the Highlands in the early 2000s, but both were denied approval by the Washington State Department of Health in 2005 after it became apparent that the area had ample capacity. Swedish appealed the decision and was granted approval to build the hospital in 2007.

=== Transportation ===
Issaquah Highlands is primarily served by Highlands Drive, an arterial street that travels south towards Interstate 90 and downtown Issaquah. The neighborhood also has a network of bicycle lanes and off-street paths that connect to inter-neighborhood trails.

King County Metro and Sound Transit operate bus services to the Issaquah Highlands and a park and ride north of the commercial district. The 1,000-stall park and ride was built in 2006 and is served by Sound Transit Express routes 554, 555 and 556, which travel west towards Downtown Seattle, Downtown Bellevue and North Seattle. King County Metro operates commuter service to Seattle as well as local service to the park and ride, Swedish Medical Center and downtown Issaquah on route 200, a free shuttle service.
