= Harvey Manning =

American walker

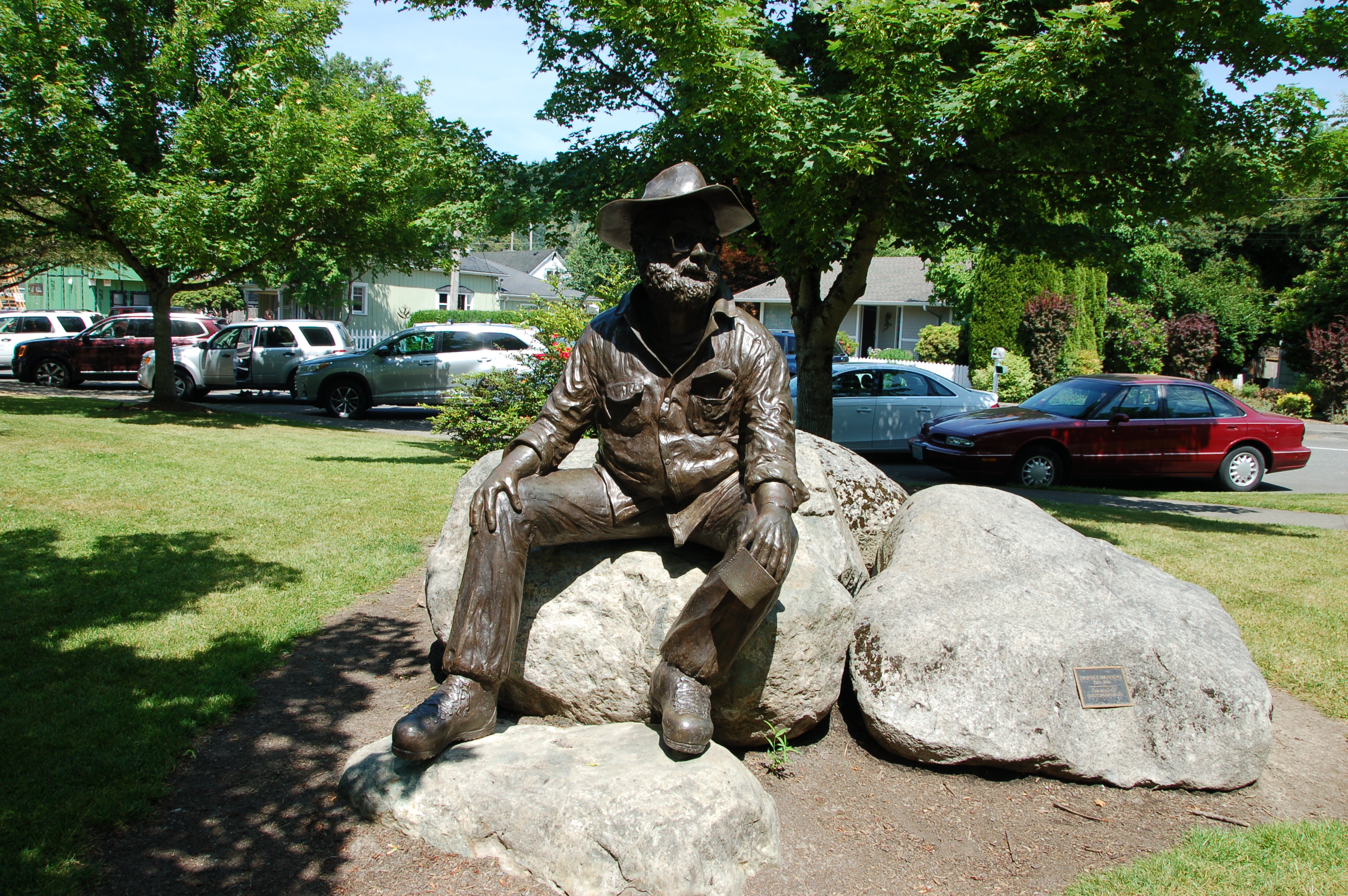
- Statue of Manning in Issaquah, Washington
- Born: July 16, 1925; Ballard, Seattle, Washington
- Died: November 12, 2006 (aged 81); Bellevue, Washington
- Writing career
- Subject: Hiking/climbing guides
- Notable work: Mountaineering: The Freedom of the Hills

Harvey Manning (July 16, 1925 in Ballard, Seattle, Washington - November 12, 2006 in Bellevue, Washington) was a noted author of hiking guides and climbing textbooks, and a tireless hiking advocate. Manning lived on Cougar Mountain, within the city limits of Bellevue, Washington, calling his home the "200-meter hut". His book Walking the Beach to Bellingham is an autobiography and manifesto fleshing out his journal of a hike along the shore of Puget Sound over a two-year span.

From 1954 to 1956, Harvey Manning managed Seattle radio station KISW.

Harvey Manning died November 12, 2006, in Bellevue.

== Books ==
Manning is most famous for being the editorial committee chair for the first edition of Mountaineering: The Freedom of the Hills, a textbook for climbing and scrambling. The first edition was so successful that it created Mountaineers Books, the publishing outlet of The Mountaineers.

Manning is also noted for writing the "100 Hikes" series of hiking guidebooks, along with Ira Spring:

- 50 Hikes in Mount Rainier National Park (1969) ISBN 0-89886-572-7
- 101 Hikes in the North Cascades (1970) ISBN 0-916890-82-1
- 102 Hikes in the Alpine Lakes, South Cascades, and Olympics (1971) ISBN 0-89886-067-9
- 100 Hikes in the South Cascades and Olympics (1985) ISBN
- 100 Hikes in the Glacier Peak Region (1988) ISBN 0-89886-868-8
- 55 Hikes in Central Washington (1990) ISBN 0-89886-510-7
- 100 Classic Hikes in Washington (1998) ISBN 0-89886-586-7 (Winner National Outdoor Book Award, Design and Artistic Merit, 1998)
- 55 Hikes around Snoqualmie Pass (2001) ISBN 0-89886-777-0

These guidebooks are the standard books for hiking throughout western Washington.

Manning also wrote many other books on outdoor activities, including:

- Backpacking: One Step at a Time (1972) ISBN 0-394-74290-7
- Footsore, Vols 1-4 (1977) ISBN 0-89886-065-2 (a series of guidebooks to hiking near Issaquah, Washington).
- Walking the Beach to Bellingham (1986) ISBN 0-87071-547-X

== Advocacy ==
Manning advocated trail protection and maintenance for much of his life, based on his extensive experience in the Washington outdoors (having backpacked since the 1930s). He was the bane of mountain bikers in the Seattle area. Manning believed foot traffic (both the boots and the horseshoe variety) cannot coexist with the greater speeds of bicycle enthusiasts and disdained local politicians beholden to wheeled-recreation advocates for "spouting pure Lycra". Largely as a result of his efforts, Cougar Mountain is off-limits to bikes and even Tiger Mountain has very limited single-track mileage where bikes are permitted.

Manning was a member of the North Cascades Conservation Council (NCCC) since its founding in 1957, serving as an editor of the NCCC journal "The Wild Cascades." Back issues are available on the NCCC website, see link below. A DVD of images of the North Cascades with his writing as the script is released by Crest Pictures as "The Irate Birdwatcher," which was a moniker he used in his early writings. His final book, published by NCCC, is "Wilderness Alps: Conservation and Conflict in the North Cascades," and details the history of the preservation movement there. It is available at the NCCC website.

Many of the names for peaks, creeks, wetlands, and trails on Cougar Mountain were invented by Harvey Manning. He discovered Coal Creek Falls and beat a trail to it, and discovered the foundation for the steam hoist in Red Town. With the goal of preserving wildlands within urban King County, Manning designated (in the pages of Footsore 1) the odd twenty mile-long (32.2 km) spur of Cascade Mountain foothills along Interstate 90 near Seattle as the "Issaquah Alps" and founded the Issaquah Alps Trails Club in 1979. The club serves to improve and publicize hiking around Issaquah, Washington. A bronze statue of Manning stands in an Issaquah park.

Today, many of his conservation goals are carried on by the American Alps Legacy Project, an initiative of NCCC and the Mountaineers.
