= Washington Trails Association =

American non-profit organization

- Established: 1966
- Founder: Louise Marshall
- Type: 501(c)(3) nonprofit
- Purpose: Outdoor recreation activism
- Headquarters: 705 2nd Avenue; Suite 300; Seattle, Washington, U.S.
- Coordinates: 47°36′11″N 122°20′01″W
- Region served: Washington state
- Members: 23,000 (2024)
- CEO: Jaime Loucky
- Website: wta.org

The Washington Trails Association (WTA) is a non-profit organization that advocates protection of hiking trails and wilderness, conducts trail maintenance, and promotes recreational hiking in the U.S. state of Washington. The organization maintains online resources related to hiking, which includes a guide with user-submitted trip reports, and trains volunteers to lead hikes and maintain trails. WTA was founded in 1966 and is headquartered in Seattle.

== History ==
The forerunner to the WTA was the magazine Signpost, initially a newsletter founded in 1966 by guidebook author Louise Marshall. She was also the author of several books in the 100 Hikes series, co-founded the American Hiking Society, and advocated for the creation of the Pacific Crest Trail. Another prominent local guidebook author, Ira Spring, was a member of the Board of Directors from 1982 until he died in 2003. The organization grew to advocate for public access to United States Forest Service lands as well as the development of hiking trails. Signpost was later succeeded by Washington Trails, which continues to be published by the WTA. In 1999, the organization launched a website with an online hiking guide, trip reports, and trail damage reports.

In 1993, WTA's former executive director, the late Greg Ball, launched the organization's volunteer trail maintenance program, completing 250 hours of trail work on public lands. Between 1995 and 2005, the hours of trail maintenance were reported to be around 500,000. The organization had 15,000 member households and 35 full-time employees in 2017.

== Trail work ==
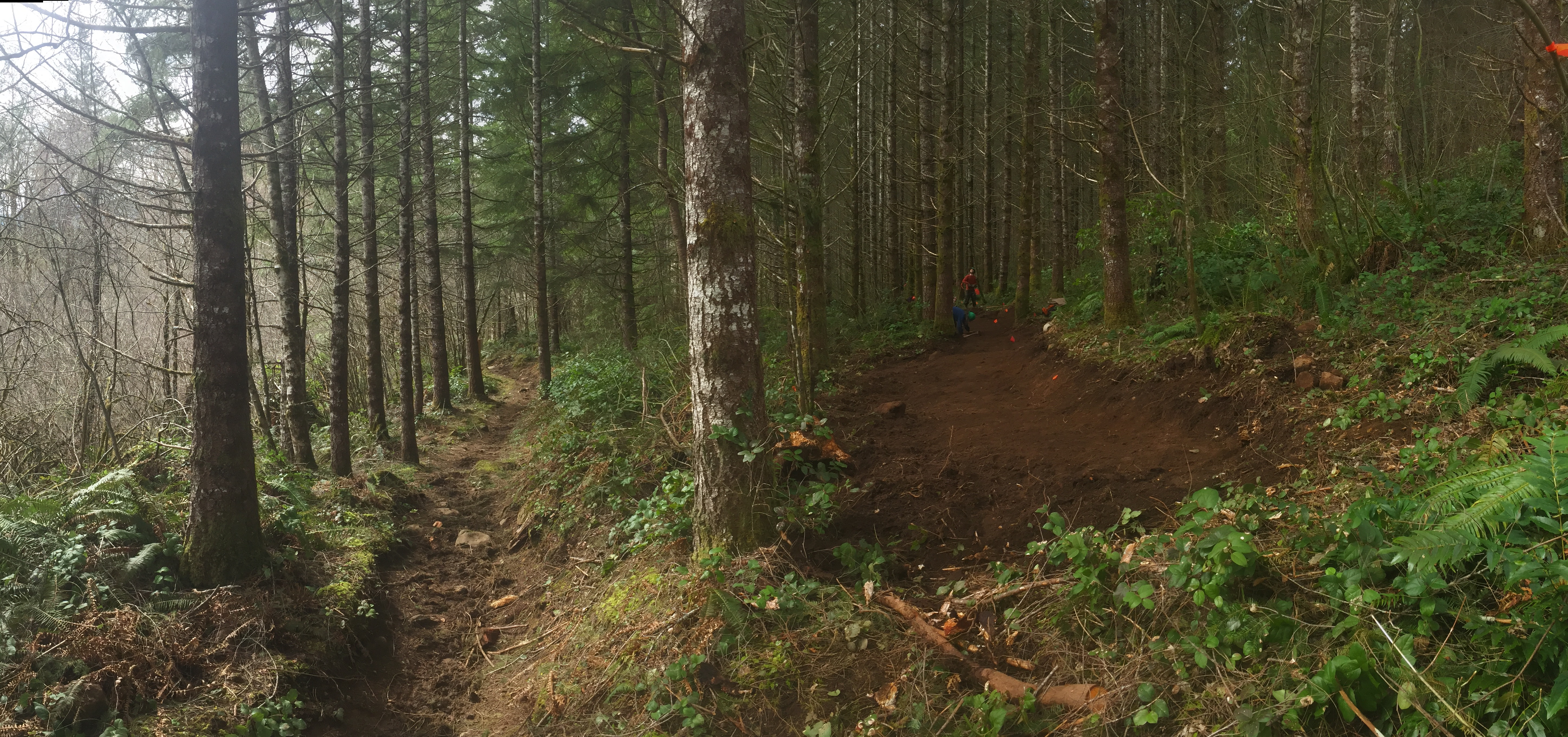
Trail work performed by WTA in Yacolt Burn State Forest.

WTA volunteers work on both backcountry and front-country trails to supplement work by federal and state government agencies. The program began in 1993 after cuts to the National Forest Service budget, particularly for trail maintenance and repairs, and was initially supervised by federal workers until the development of specifications for volunteers to follow. In 2024, 3,400 volunteers with the WTA logged 150,000 total hours of trail work. Volunteer work ranges from one-day sessions at low-elevation sites to multi-day trips at higher elevations and areas that require extensive construction.

WTA partnered with the Washington State Parks and Recreation Commission to make the Hardy Ridge trail system in Beacon Rock State Park functional for backcountry hikers, mountain bikers, and equestrians by 2006. Trail work was also performed on the front-country trail Margaret's Way, located on Squak Mountain. Contributors to this project included the Washington Trails Association, the Issaquah Alps Trail Club, and King County Parks.

== Programs ==
WTA offers programs for outdoor learning and volunteering. A hiking learning program allows attendees to borrow or rent equipment at a low cost from the WTA's gear library. WTA also coordinates regional work parties where youth can participate in trail maintenance. In 2020, high school students volunteered to work on a week-long project to re-route Trail 130 and 131 at Mount Spokane.

The organization's annual fundraiser, the Hike-a-Thon, raises funds for trail maintenance.

== Stewardship ==
WTA is one of 50 outdoor organizations that comprise the Washington Recreate Responsibly Coalition, which formed in 2020 during the COVID-19 pandemic to address the rise in outdoor recreation during lockdown periods. The coalition published a list of recommendations to encourage "responsible recreation" amid the pandemic and a rise in trail use.

== Organization ==
WTA is a 501(c)(3) nonprofit organization with its headquarters in Downtown Seattle. In 2024, the organization had $12 million in net assets and total revenue of $8.85 million, primarily from individual donations. The organization had 23,000 members in 2024. The current CEO, Jaime Loucky, joined WTA in 2020.
