= Issaquah Salmon Days =

Festival in Washington, United States

- 2026 festival on Front Street
- Significance: Celebrates the end of the salmon run, where salmon return to Issaquah to lay eggs.
- Celebrations: Food, Parade, Salmon watching
- Date: First Saturday and Sunday in October
- 2025 date: October 4–5
- 2026 date: October 3–4
- 2027 date: October 2–3
- 2028 date: October 7–8
- Frequency: Annual

Issaquah Salmon Days is a festival held in Issaquah, Washington that celebrates the return of the salmon. The main features of the event are a parade, live music, and a market for artisans to sell their wares and food. The purpose of the event is to celebrate the end of the salmon run, where salmon return to their birth river to lay eggs. The first festival was in 1970 and has continued annually since its founding. In 2006, the festival's economic impact was estimated at 1.5 million dollars.

== History ==
Issaquah Salmon Days was created when Earl Robinson, the president of the Issaquah Chamber, suggested hosting a salmon festival because of existing salmon tourism in the area, and the local Issaquah Salmon Hatchery, where salmon return annually to lay eggs. There was also a want to replace the local Labor Day festival, which had ended two years previously. The first festival was in October 1970, and was presented by the Greater Issaquah Chamber of Commerce, with around 20,000 people attending. At the time it was a small event with limited attractions and remained so for the rest of the 1970s.

In 1980, Salmon Days was officially sanctioned by Seafair, meaning that Seafair clowns, pirates, and floats were added. There was an added parade for adults with parade floats, instead of just one parade for children. The festival also joined the Northwest Festivals Association in 1985, which helps to plan and execute the festival. A paid festival director was hired in 1987 for the first time. During the 1980s, attendance more than doubled, growing from 65,000 in 1980 to 150,000 in 1988.

Through the 1990s and 2000s, the festival averaged around 150,000 to 200,000 visitors. In 2006, the festival's economic impact was measured at around 1.5 million dollars. In response to the COVID-19 pandemic, the 2020 festival introduced online events such as art and recipe competitions, a hatchery webcam, and an interactive festival app. Select in-person activities such as a car show and farmers market continued with safety measures in place. The modified events continued in 2021, with emphasis on virtual events and masks remaining required for in-person festivities. Today, the festival is still run once a year.

== Festival attractions ==
Salmon Days includes more than 270 artists that line Front Street and Sunset Way, more than fifty food vendors, the Field of Fun with free activities, and five stages offering live entertainment.

=== Historical attractions ===
When the festival was created in 1970, attractions included the Kiwanis BBQ, Issaquah Salmon Hatchery tours, a children's parade led by J.P. Patches, and firefighter crew competitions. By the 1980s, the festival had expanded with a parade for adults with a competition for the best float.

=== Streets-arts and crafts ===
Front Street from Newport Way to Gilman Boulevard and Sunset from Newport Way to Second Avenue SE are closed during the festival due to the different arts and craft vendors and other Salmon Days sponsor booths. During the festival, booths are set up on the side of the roads with items for people to look at and buy. Different arts and crafts offered include jewelry, paintings, children's toys, clothing, pottery, glass sculptures, gourmet food, home & garden art, leather, metal, musical products, photography, and wood sculptures. The streets close at 8 a.m. and reopen at 7 p.m. during both days of the festival.

=== Memorial Field-Field of Fun ===
During Salmon Days, Veterans' Memorial Park has many activities for children. This area is known as the Field of Fun. Activities include pony rides, inflatables, trampoline jumping, Puget Sound DockDogs competition, and fish prints. A kids' train also circles the parking lot adjacent to the Memorial Park.

=== Foods of the World ===
In the area south of the Veterans' Memorial Park in the Train Depot parking lot is the Foods of the World, which has many different foods, such as hamburgers and fries, barbecue, Chinese, Japanese, Mexican, and Korean foods. Drink options include smoothies and fresh-squeezed lemonade. Dessert choices include caramel apple, strawberry shortcake, apple dumpling, elephant ears, and chocolate-dipped strawberries on a stick.

=== Issaquah Salmon Hatchery ===
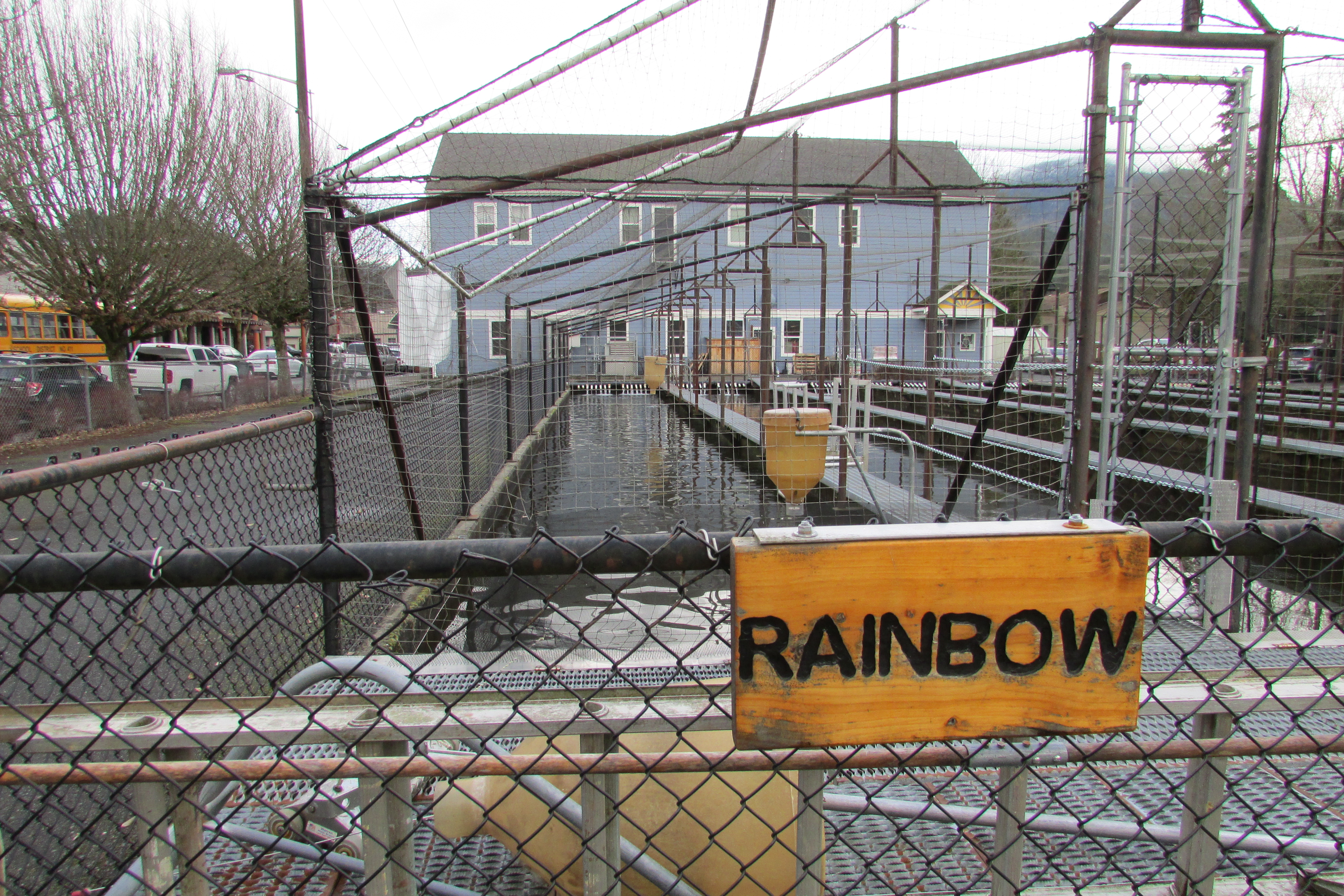
Issaquah Salmon Hatchery

The Issaquah Salmon Hatchery, operated by the Washington State Department of Fish & Wildlife, remains open during the festival. There are several locations on the hatchery grounds where visitors can see chinook, and coho, that have returned to their native waters to spawn. These viewing areas include a pedestrian bridge across Issaquah Creek and windows that provide a view of the hatchery's fish ladder and holding pond. Although tours are not available during Salmon Days, docents from Friends of the Issaquah Salmon Hatchery (FISH) are stationed throughout the hatchery to answer questions from visitors during the festival.
