= Stella Alexander (American politician) =

American politician (1881–1960)

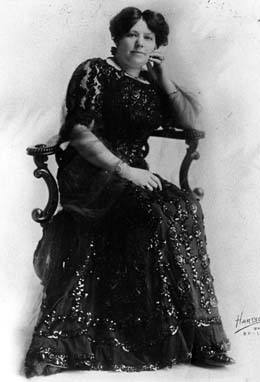

Mayor of Issaquah, Washington
- In office June 6, 1932 – January 1, 1934

Member of the Issaquah Town Council
- In office 1927 – May 1930

Personal details
- Born: Stella May McCutcheon; July 2, 1881; Lancaster, Pennsylvania, U.S.
- Died: January 8, 1960 (aged 78); Seattle, Washington, U.S.

Stella May McCutcheon Burkhart Alexander (July 2, 1881 – January 8, 1960) was an American politician who served as mayor of Issaquah, Washington, from 1932 until 1934. The first female mayor of Issaquah, Alexander faced fierce opposition from the town council and other government officials and, after surviving two recall petitions, she was removed from office by a recall election in 1934. Prior to being elected mayor, Alexander was a member of the Issaquah Town Council. After being recalled, Alexander moved to Renton, where she ran a hotel.

== Early life ==
Alexander was born on July 2, 1881, in Lancaster, Pennsylvania. She was one of six children who were split apart when their parents separated. In her youth Alexander spent time living with her older sister and in an orphanage before entering indentured servitude for a man named Josiah Summy. Alexander was abandoned by Summy in California in 1895, when she was thirteen or fourteen years old. Alexander married Fredrick Burkhart in 1901, however, the marriage ended in divorce after Alexander discovered that her new husband was already married to another woman. Alexander's second marriage was to John Alexander in 1919. The two moved to Issaquah, Washington, shortly afterwards.

== Political career ==
On March 8, 1932, Alexander was elected Mayor of Issaquah with 195 votes, earning a 59-vote majority over her opponent. The Seattle Star credited her win to a coalition of housewives and mothers in Issaquah. Shortly after her election, Alexander outlined her plan for the community, saying that she would run the town government like "a model home." In June 1932, Alexander advocated for state and federal assistance to counter unemployment in Washington to a state-wide meeting of mayors, an advocacy that was adopted unanimously.

On July 21, 1933, a recall petition was filed against Alexander accusing her of committing malfeasance and of violating her oath of office. The recall petition was signed by 202 of the town's residents, more than the majority that had elected her. Charles McQuade, a member of Issaquah's town council, commented that "we elected her mayor, but she thinks she's the dictator and is trying to run the whole show." Alexander had lost the support of nearly the entire town government, with three members of the town council resigning, the town treasurer refusing to process any expenses, and the fire chief quitting. Upon his departure, the town's former fire chief said that Alexander would "have to haul the truck and fight the flames herself" if a fire broke out. Tensions quickly boiled over in the town, with a riot breaking out and causing multiple injuries. The city council named McQuade mayor pro tem and Alexander responded by attempting to appoint a replacement council unilaterally. The dispute went to court, with a King County Superior Court judge ruling that Alexander did not have the authority to appoint a new council but also invalidating the recall petition. The judge described the proceedings as being "contrary to statutes" because Alexander had not received proper notification of the recall petition.

On August 16, a second recall effort began. The petitioners waited to file the petitions until after making a notification of charges in order to avoid the procedural issues that had doomed the previous effort. This recall quickly also failed and a third petition was filed on September 29. In November, Alexander sued the organizers of the effort for defamation, claiming that it had caused "humiliation and damage to her health". The following day, Alexander lost a case to prevent the second recall, with the judge ruling that the truth of allegations had no bearing on whether a recall vote could occur. The recall campaign was characterized by sharp rhetoric, with Alexander's opponents describing her as "Madame Mussolini" and accusing her of instituting an "illegal feminine dictatorship". The recall election occurred on January 2, 1934, and Alexander was recalled with 206 votes in favor and 85 against.

Alexander remained in relatively good spirits after being recalled, joking to The News Tribune that "Next time [she'll] go out for a big job." In the days following the recall, Alexander received support from former Mayor of Seattle Bertha Landes, who had made history as the first woman elected mayor of a major American city. Despite her initial good spirits, Alexander refused to return the keys to town hall for a week after the election, preventing the interim mayor from officially taking power. The keys were eventually returned on the night of January 8. The city council's first post-recall action was to pay off several of the town's bills, which they had previously accused Alexander of incurring illegally.

Alexander sought political office several more times in the following years. In 1934, she ran for the mayoral position again but lost, receiving only three votes. Later that year she filed to run for state representative as a Republican. In 1938, Alexander ran for the same state representative position as a Democrat. She sought the Republican nomination for Secretary of State of Washington in 1940. She did not make the ballots in 1934 or 1938, but in 1940 she received 12,233 votes (2.80% of the total).

== Later life ==
Alexander left Issaquah for Renton in 1936, three years after being recalled. She and her husband purchased a hotel there, which they managed together. After her husband's death in 1950, Alexander sold the hotel and most of her other property in order to live off the proceeds. She died in a Seattle hotel on January 8, 1960.
