= Rattlesnake Ridge =

Mountain in Washington, United States

Rattlesnake Mountain
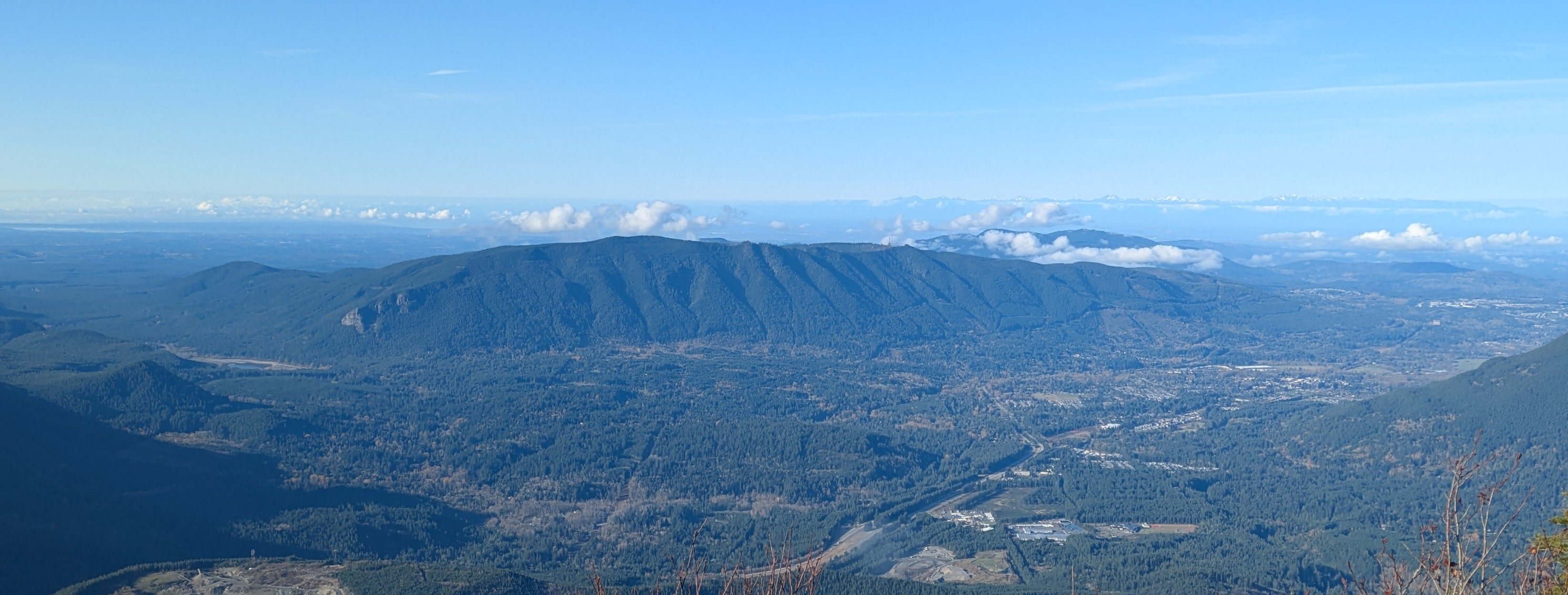
- Rattlesnake Ridge from Mailbox Peak

Highest point
- Elevation: 3,480+ feet (1,061+ m)
- Prominence: 2,520 ft (770 m)
- Coordinates: 47°27′30″N 121°48′22″W

Geography
- Location: King County, Washington state, U.S.
- Parent range: Issaquah Alps, Cascades
- Topo map: USGS North Bend

Climbing
- Easiest route: Hike

Rattlesnake Ridge (Lushootseed: daʔšədabš) is the ridge of Rattlesnake Mountain located south of North Bend, Washington, United States. The western end is near the intersection of State Route 18 and I-90 in Snoqualmie, Washington, and runs southeast about 7 miles (11 km) or 11 miles (18 km) by trail. It is the highest and easternmost of the Issaquah Alps (although Cedar Butte in the gap between Rattlesnake Mountain and the Cascade front at Mount Washington is considered by Harvey Manning to be a quasi-Alp). A maze of abandoned logging roads and constructed trails have been strung together to provide a 10.5-mile (16.9 km) footpath from the Snoqualmie Point trailhead at Exit 27 on I-90 all the way to the Rattlesnake Lake trailhead near Exit 32.

Rattlesnake Ledge is a rock outcropping and viewpoint 1160 feet above Rattlesnake Lake. Rattlesnake Ledge is a very popular hike destination. The Rattlesnake Ledge Trail makes up the eastern 2 mile segment of the Rattlesnake Ridge or Rattlesnake Mountain Trail.

Several recreational opportunities exist, including hiking and rock-climbing.

== Legal status ==
Most of the mountain is owned by the state of Washington or King County, and is protected as Rattlesnake Mountain Scenic Area, managed jointly by the Washington State Department of Natural Resources and King County Park and Recreation Department. The eastern section of the mountain, including the ledges, is owned by Seattle Public Utilities, while large sections in the western part of the ridge are owned by Weyerhaeuser Corporation, which conducts substantial logging operations there.

== Deadly incidents ==
On May 30, 2009, a 28-year-old man fell one hundred feet to his death from a ledge on Rattlesnake Ridge. Officials say Ruben Maldonado, 28, of Snohomish County, fell from the popular hiking area above Rattlesnake Lake around 12:15 p.m.

On March 9, 2012, a 32-year-old man fell about 300 feet from a ridge. He was found dead by another hiker who saw the fall.

On February 9, 2013, a Redmond man missing near Rattlesnake Ridge was found dead at about 10 a.m. Bove said King County Search and Rescue found the body of Ira Thomas Clodfelter, 28, about three-quarters of a mile from the main trail, and it appeared to be a suicide. The King County Medical Examiner said February 11 that Clodfelter died from a gunshot wound to the head and ruled it a suicide.

On August 29, 2013, a man in his 20s fell to his death while hiking in the Rattlesnake Ridge area of Snoqualmie near Rattlesnake Lake. King County Sheriffs deputies received a 911 call around 10:55 a.m. from a woman who said someone had fallen off Rattlesnake Ridge. When rescue personnel arrived, a friend of the victim told them she and the man had hiked to the top of the ridge. She was taking pictures of the man, who was near the ledge, when he slipped and fell as he was trying to jump to a rock. Medics found the man's body and determined he had fallen about 150 feet to his death.

On March 3, 2018, a 16-year-old boy died after falling off of Rattlesnake Ridge. He was attempting to take a picture and slipped due to icy conditions at the top of the mountain. Search and Rescue was called at 8:40 a.m. and the body was located at 9:15 a.m.

== Climate ==
Rattlesnake Ridge is located in the marine west coast (Koppen: Csb/Cfb) climate zone of western North America. Most weather fronts originate in the Pacific Ocean, and travel northeast toward the Cascade Mountains. As fronts approach the North Cascades, they are forced upward by the peaks of the Cascade Range, causing them to drop their moisture in the form of rain or snowfall onto the Cascades (Orographic lift). As a result, the west side of the North Cascades experiences high precipitation, especially during the winter months in the form of snowfall. During winter months, weather is usually cloudy, but, due to high pressure systems over the Pacific Ocean that intensify during summer months, there is often little or no cloud cover during the summer.
