= Tiger Mountain (Washington) =

Mountain in Issaquah, Washington

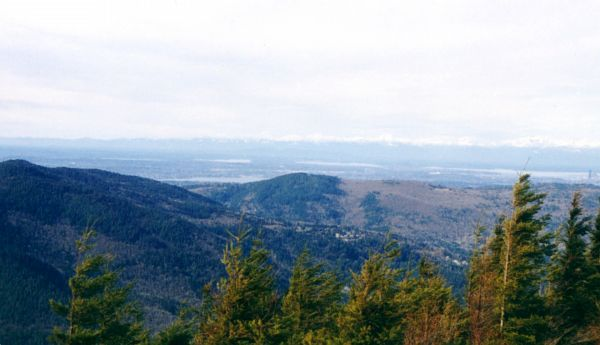
- Squak Mountain, Cougar Mountain, and Seattle seen from the summit of West Tiger #3

Highest point
- Elevation: 3,004 ft (916 m) NAVD 88
- Prominence: 1,644 ft (501 m)
- Coordinates: 47°29′17″N 121°56′49″W

Geography
- Location within Washington (state)
- Location: Issaquah, Washington, US
- Parent range: Issaquah Alps
- Topo map: USGS Hobart

Tiger Mountain is a mountain in the U.S. state of Washington. It is at the center of the Issaquah Alps, a small range in the Eastside region of King County, Washington southeast of Seattle. The mountain is largely encompassed by the Tiger Mountain State Forest and has several recreational areas used for hiking, mountain biking, and paragliding.

== Characteristics ==
The mountain has six peaks in the center of the Issaquah Alps, forming a 13,500-acre (55 km^{2}) triangle between Interstate 90 (I-90) on the north, Issaquah-Hobart Road on the southwest, and State Route 18 (SR 18) on the southeast. Immediately to the west is Squak Mountain followed by Cougar Mountain, while to the southeast are McDonald and Taylor Mountains, and Rattlesnake Ridge.

== Tiger Mountain State Forest ==
Tiger Mountain State Forest was established in 1981. In 1989, the entire Issaquah Plateau in the northwest corner was designated as a conservation area, the West Tiger Mountain Natural Resources Conservation Area, accessed by a large trailhead at Exit 20 on I-90. It is 13,745 acres.

A popular trail leads to the bald summit of West Tiger #3, with a panoramic view of Seattle and points to the south and east. It is a 6.2-mile (10.0 km) hike, round-trip, with an elevation change of about 2,000 feet (610 m). The nearby peaks of West Tiger #2 and West Tiger #1 provide essentially the same view, but with fewer obstructions.

State Route 18 runs between Tiger and Taylor mountains, reaching an elevation of 1,375 feet (419 m). This stretch of the highway is commonly referred to as the "Tiger Mountain Summit" in local traffic reports. Another major trailhead is located at this summit. The trail provides access to South Tiger Mountain with limited views, Middle Tiger Mountain with a 45-degree window looking down on the Cedar Hills Landfill, and East Tiger Mountain with a panoramic view south toward Mount Rainier.

Many trails on Tiger Mountain have wide beds and slope very gently because they are built on the remnants of 1920s logging railroads, long after the rails and crossties were salvaged in the Great Depression. Near Middle Tiger Mountain is the site of a fatal 1924 train wreck where artifacts can still be seen.

In the most remote part of the forest, 15 Mile Creek (a tributary of Issaquah Creek) arises in the pass between East and West Tiger. The creek carves a miniature "Grand Canyon" through sandstone. Much of Tiger Mountain is owned or managed by the Washington State Department of Natural Resources.

The popular Tradition Lake loop trail is located on the northwest edge of the mountain. It is accessible via the High Point trailhead off of Interstate 90 in Washington.

== Paragliding history ==
Poo Poo Point is a bare ridge on the west side of Tiger Mountain. The name "Poo Poo" Point came from the sound of the steam whistles that loggers used to communicate along the mountainside. As recently as the 1970s, the area was owned by Weyerhaeuser and used for commercial logging. The clear-cut area became popular with hang gliders and paragliders as a launching spot reachable by old logging roads. The point is now reached by the Chirico Trail, which starts at the landing zone for the hang gliders and paragliders in a field adjacent to the Issaquah-Hobart Road, or by taking the High School Trail which begins on 2nd Avenue just south of Issaquah High School. Many people fly year-round (weather permitting) and have flown cross-country flights exceeding 75 miles (121 km).

Poo Poo Point got its start as a paragliding destination in the 1990s. In 1990, the Northwest Paragliding Club was formed, and the following year the first site improvements were made to the Poo Poo Point north launch by Team Chirico using heavy equipment to level it and clear debris. In 1995, the south launch was similarly leveled and cleared of debris. In 1997, the Chirico Trail was started; it was finally finished in 2000. In the subsequent years, Astro Turf was soon installed at Poo Poo Point.

While there have been a significant number of paragliding incidents, there have not been any paragliding fatalities on Tiger Mountain. However, in 2008, Eric Jansen died of natural causes while paragliding from Tiger Mountain. In 2011, Ken Blanchard died in a neighboring valley while on a cross-country flight. Poo Poo Point is currently the most popular spot for paragliding in Washington.

== Transmitting facilities ==
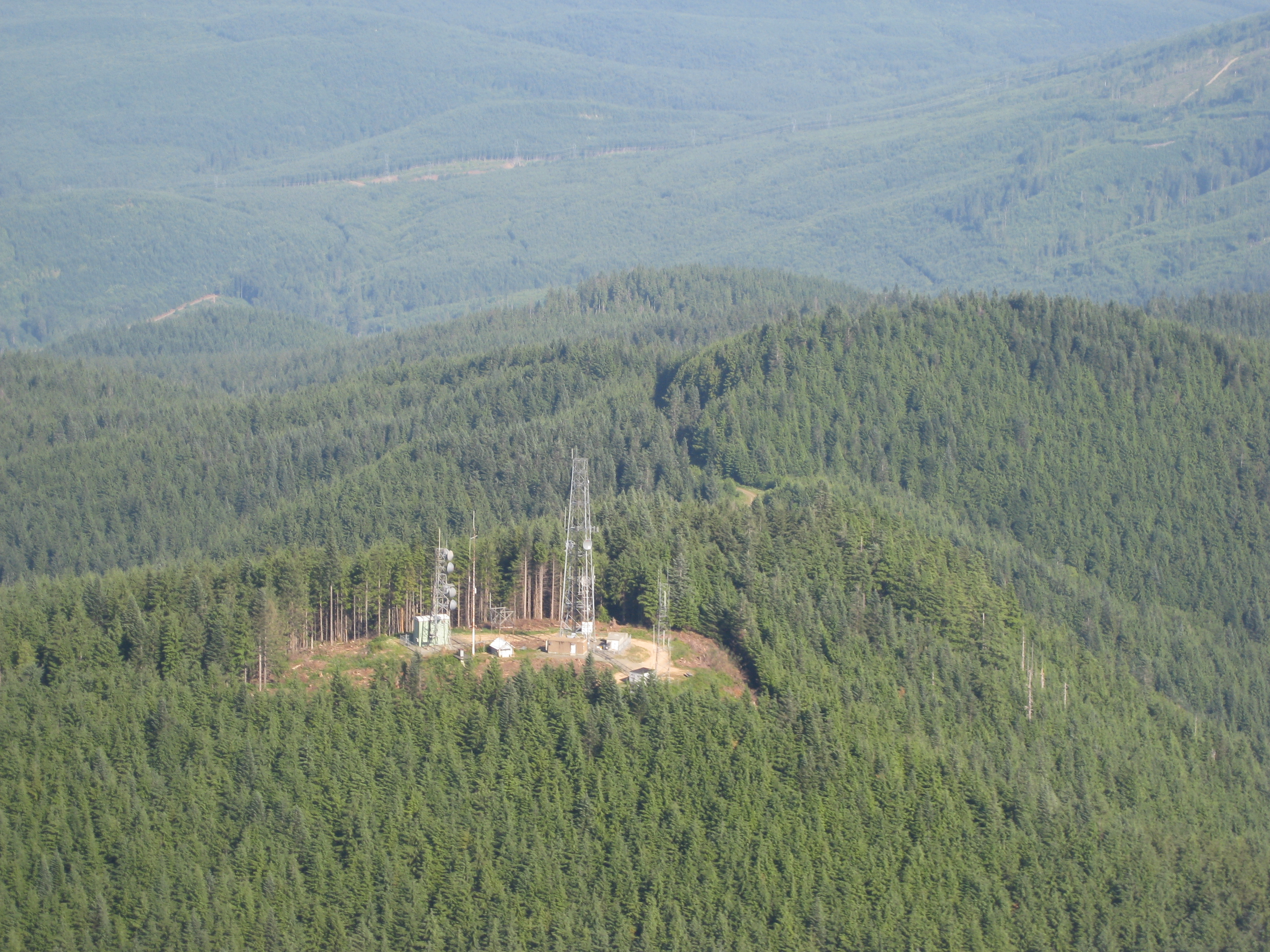
Aerial view of antennas on Tiger Mountain

Some Seattle-area radio station transmitters are on Tiger Mountain's west face. These include:

- KNKX 88.5
- KQMV 92.5
- KSWD 94.1
- KJAQ 96.5
- KIRO-FM 97.3
- KING-FM 98.1
- KPNW-FM 98.9
- KISW 99.9
- KKWF 100.7
- KZOK-FM 102.5
- KHTP 103.7
- KBKS-FM 106.1
- KNDD 107.7

== Sources ==
- Zilly, John (2003). Beyond Mount Si: The Best Hikes Within 85 Miles of Seattle. Seattle: Adventure Press. ISBN 1-881583-08-2.
