= Issaquah Creek =

River in Washington (state), US

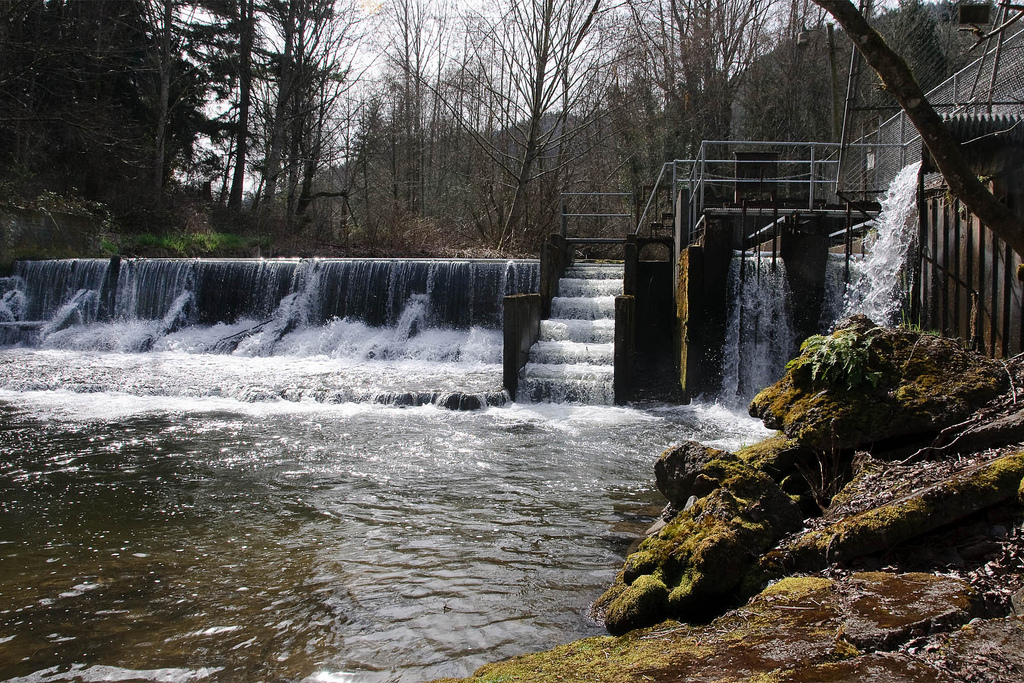
- Upper dam on Issaquah Creek

- Location of the mouth of Issaquah Creek in Washington Issaquah Creek (the United States)

Location
- Country: United States
- State: Washington
- County: King

Physical characteristics
- Source: Issaquah Alps
  - coordinates: 47°26′41″N 121°59′28″W
- Mouth: Lake Sammamish
  - coordinates: 47°33′43″N 122°3′52″W
- Length: 13 mi (21 km)
- Basin size: 61 sq mi (160 km^{2})
- Discharge
  - location: USGS gage 12121600 at river mile 1.2
  - average: 130 cu ft/s (3.7 m^{3}/s)
  - minimum: 6.2 cu ft/s (0.18 m^{3}/s)
  - maximum: 3,200 cu ft/s (91 m^{3}/s)

Issaquah Creek (Lushootseed: qʷaxʷ) is a small stream flowing through the city of Issaquah and nearby communities, in the U.S. state of Washington. Its headwaters are on the slopes of Cougar, Squak, Tiger, and Taylor mountains in the Issaquah Alps. Tributaries of Issaquah Creek include Holder Creek, Carey Creek, Fifteen-mile Creek, McDonald Creek, East Fork Issaquah Creek, and North Fork Issaquah Creek. The creek empties into the south end of Lake Sammamish. The lake's outlet is the Sammamish River, which in turn empties into Lake Washington and ultimately Puget Sound.

Issaquah Creek's drainage basin is over 75% forest land and less than 10% urbanized or cleared. The basin is one of the three most significant in urbanizing King County. The upper and middle portions of the basin have been identified as a Regionally Significant Resource area due to their exceptional fish habitat and undeveloped character. The entire basin is an important salmon migration and spawning area. Carry Creek and Holder Creek, in the upper Issaquah Creek basin, provide particularly excellent salmonid habitat.

Every October people gather on its shores (especially during Issaquah's Salmon Days Festival, which has several viewpoints staffed with Friends of Issaquah Salmon Hatchery FISH docents explaining the salmon run) to watch the salmon traveling upstream. and by the local Native Americans..

Issaquah Creek and its tributaries support Chinook, coho salmon (and resident kokanee), coastal cutthroat trout. Chinook and coho are reared by the state Issaquah Salmon Hatchery, located three miles upstream from the creek's mouth. The hatchery has been releasing Chinook salmon into Issaquah Creek since 1936. Each Spring the hatchery releases approximately 500k coho (April 1) and 2.7 million Chinook smolts (in May) have been released each year.

== See also ==
- List of rivers of Washington (state)
