= Taylor Mountain (Washington) =

Summit in Washington state, US

- Location within Washington (state)

Highest point
- Elevation: 2,602 ft (793 m)
- Prominence: 500 ft (152 m)
- Coordinates: 47°27′16″N 121°53′40″W

Geography
- Location: King County, Washington

Taylor Mountain is a mountain summit in King County, Washington State in the US.

== Burial site ==
On March 1, 1975, two forestry students conducting schoolwork in the area discovered a human skull lying among the foliage. The students alerted the police and led the authorities to the exact site of the discovery. The skull was identified through dental records as that of 22-year-old Brenda Ball, who had vanished nine months prior. The next day a second skull, later identified as that of 18-year-old Susan Elaine Rancourt was discovered not far from the first location. It was at this time that authorities established a connection between this site and another, located 12 miles away in a forest near Issaquah. The police had been aware of an alleged serial killer going by the name "Ted" who had been operating in Washington recently, and linked these burial sites to him.

In the following days of the investigation, a third skull and portions of a mandible were discovered, which were identified as remains of the missing Roberta Kathleen Parks and Lynda Ann Healy respectively. The bodies were found approximately 550 feet from the road, and multiple other items were later retrieved, including a green outdoor jacket and a clump of blonde hair later identified as belonging to Rancourt. In 1989, during his confession, the serial killer Ted Bundy confessed to the murder of the women and disposal of their bodies in the area. He also claimed to have disposed of parts a fifth corpse, that of Donna Manson, near the area, although the body was never found and these claims are still disputed.

Bundy admitted to have chosen this site as a potential burial area because he believed the bodies would be interfered with by wildlife. Bundy was also known to frequently hike there and was familiar with the area. In 2005, multiple skeletal remains were uncovered in the area, at least 12 of which were determined to be human, including one fibula and two tibias. In 2006 the remains were DNA-tested. Four bones were determined to have belonged to Ball, two belonged to Parks, and one belonged to Rancourt. The other five bones remained unidentified, believed by the police to be those of Healy.
