= Ira Spring =

American environmentalist (1918–2003)

Ira Spring (1918–2003) was an American photographer, author, mountaineer and hiking advocate. He was the photographer and co-author, with Harvey Manning and his brother Bob Spring, of the "100 Hikes" series of books published by The Mountaineers. He co-founded the trails advocacy and maintenance organization Washington Trails Association (WTA) along with fellow trails advocate Louise Marshall. In 1998 he published an autobiography entitled "An Ice Axe, a Camera, and a jar of Peanut Butter" detailing his long photographic career on several continents. In recognition of this work in conservation and wilderness-preservation, he was presented with the Roosevelt Conservation Award by President George H. W. Bush in 1992. Spring was born in Jamestown, New York with a twin, Bob, and grew up in Shelton, Washington. He was an army aerial photographer in World War II. He died on June 5, 2003, in Edmonds, Washington of prostate cancer.
