= Cedar Butte Township, Pennington County, South Dakota =

Township in Pennington County, South Dakota

Coordinates: 44°7′56″N 102°19′52″W

Cedar Butte Township is a township in Pennington County, in the U.S. state of South Dakota. Its population was 42 as of the 2010 census.
