= Issaquah Alps =

Highlands near Issaquah, Washington, U.S.

Coordinates: 47°30′N 122°00′W

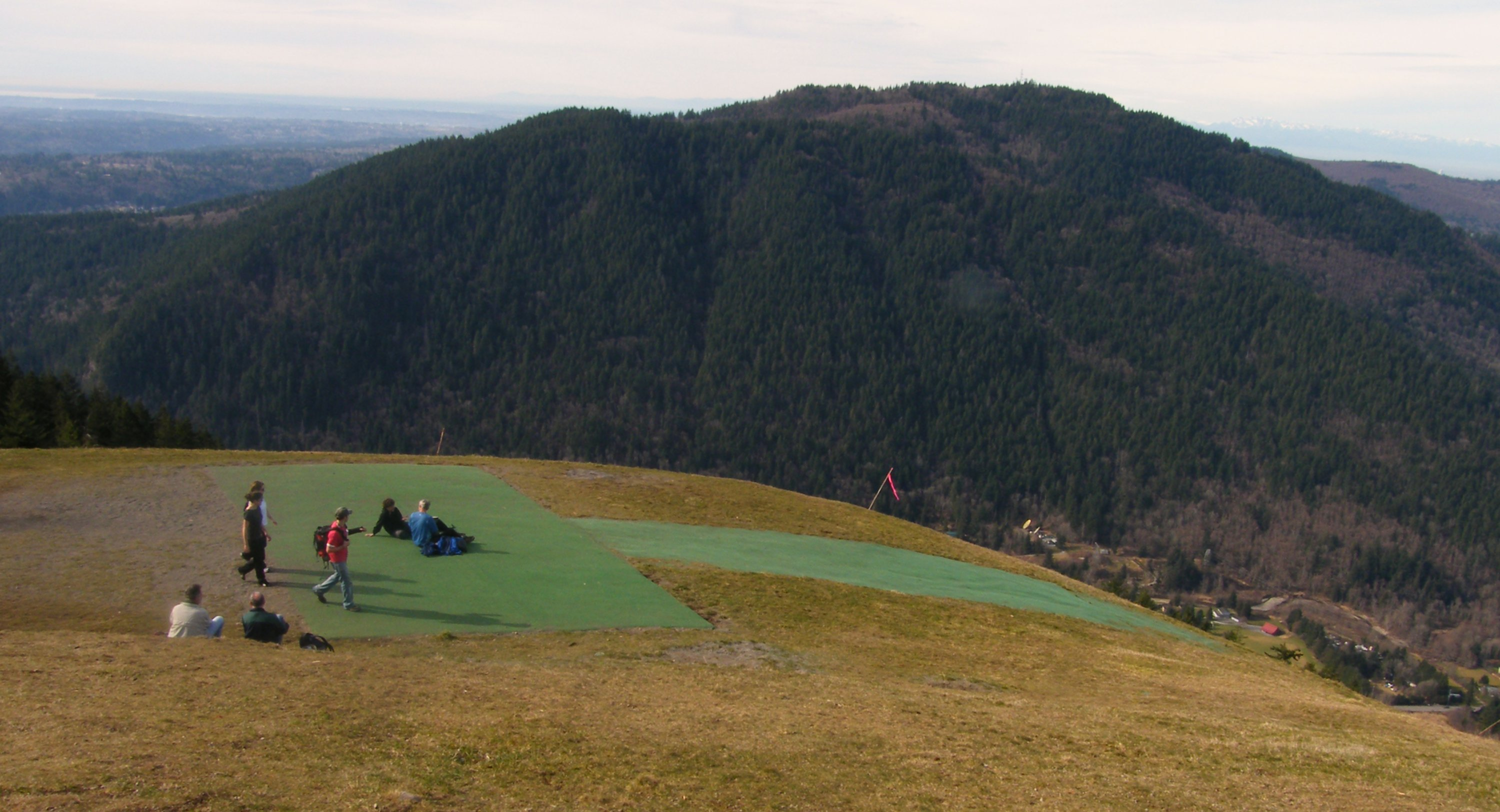
A paraglider takeoff ramp on Poo Poo Point on Tiger Mountain. Squak Mountain in background.

The Issaquah Alps is the unofficial name for the highlands near Issaquah, Washington, a suburb of Seattle, including Cougar Mountain, Squak Mountain, Tiger Mountain, Taylor Mountain, Rattlesnake Ridge, Rattlesnake Mountain, and Grand Ridge. The term was invented in 1977 by noted nature author Harvey Manning within the pages of his trail guidebook Footsore 1, elevating their status from foothills to "Alps" to advocate preservation. Manning himself lived on a developed section of Cougar Mountain in his "200 meter hut".

In 1979, Harvey Manning helped to found the Issaquah Alps Trails Club to care for the trails and to push for public ownership of the Alps. The IATC, which is headquartered in Issaquah (nicknamed "Trailhead City"), conducts frequent guided hikes throughout the Alps.

The Issaquah Alps follow Interstate 90 from the shore of Lake Washington almost to the western face of the Cascade Range. The hills are composed of andesitic volcanic rock lying on top of older tightly folded rocks from the coastal plain of the North Cascade subcontinent that docked with Washington about 50 million years ago as the entire continent of North America moved west across the ocean. The Alps were heavily eroded by glaciers in the last ice age. The Vashon lobe of the ice sculpted Rattlesnake Ledge, steeply carved the east and west sides of Squak Mountain, and deposited a large erratic on Cougar Mountain, Fantastic Erratic.

Cedar Butte rises abruptly from the moraine between Rattlesnake Ledge and the absolute front of the Cascades. It is sometimes considered part of the Issaquah Alps but it is a relatively young symmetrical volcanic cone and is therefore more closely related to neighboring Mount Washington to the east than the old weathered hills of the majority of the Alps.

== Summits ==
- Cougar Mountain, elevation 1,595 feet (486 m)
- Squak Mountain, elevation 2,024 feet (617 m)
- Taylor Mountain, elevation 2,600 feet (790 m)
- Tiger Mountain
  - Middle Tiger Mountain, elevation 2,607 feet (795 m)
  - East Tiger Mountain, elevation 3,004 feet (916 m)
  - South Tiger Mountain, elevation 2,028 feet (618 m)
  - West Tiger #1, elevation 2,948 feet (899 m)
  - West Tiger #2, elevation 2,757 feet (840 m)
  - West Tiger #3, elevation 2,522 feet (769 m)

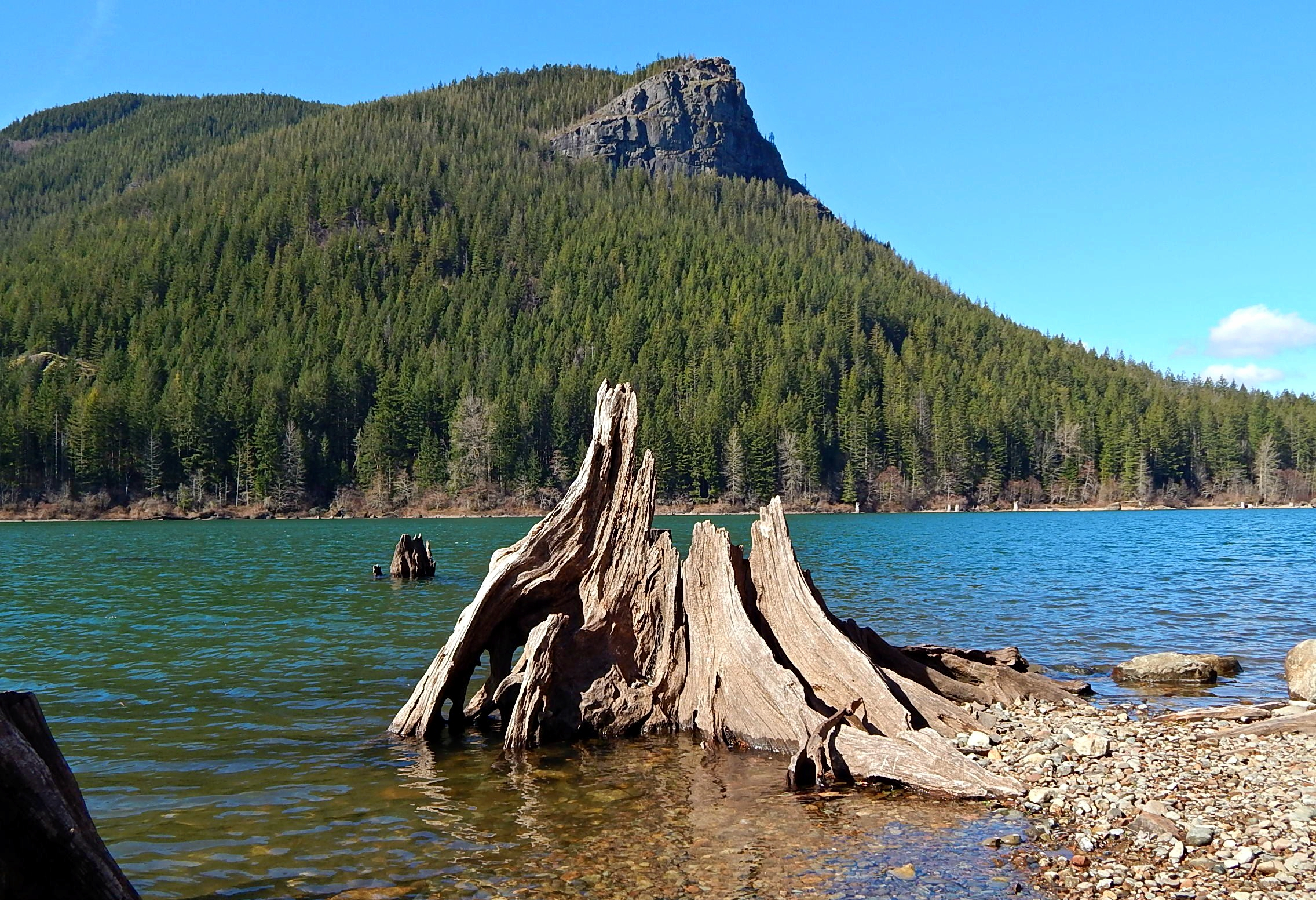
Rattlesnake Ledge

- Rattlesnake Ridge
  - Rattlesnake Ledge, elevation 2,040 feet (620 m)
  - Rattlesnake Mountain (East Peak), elevation 3,517 feet (1,072 m)
  - Rattlesnake Mountain (West Peak), elevation 3,362 feet (1,025 m)
