= Squak Mountain =

Mountain in Washington (state), United States

- dexʷkayuʔalʔtxʷ
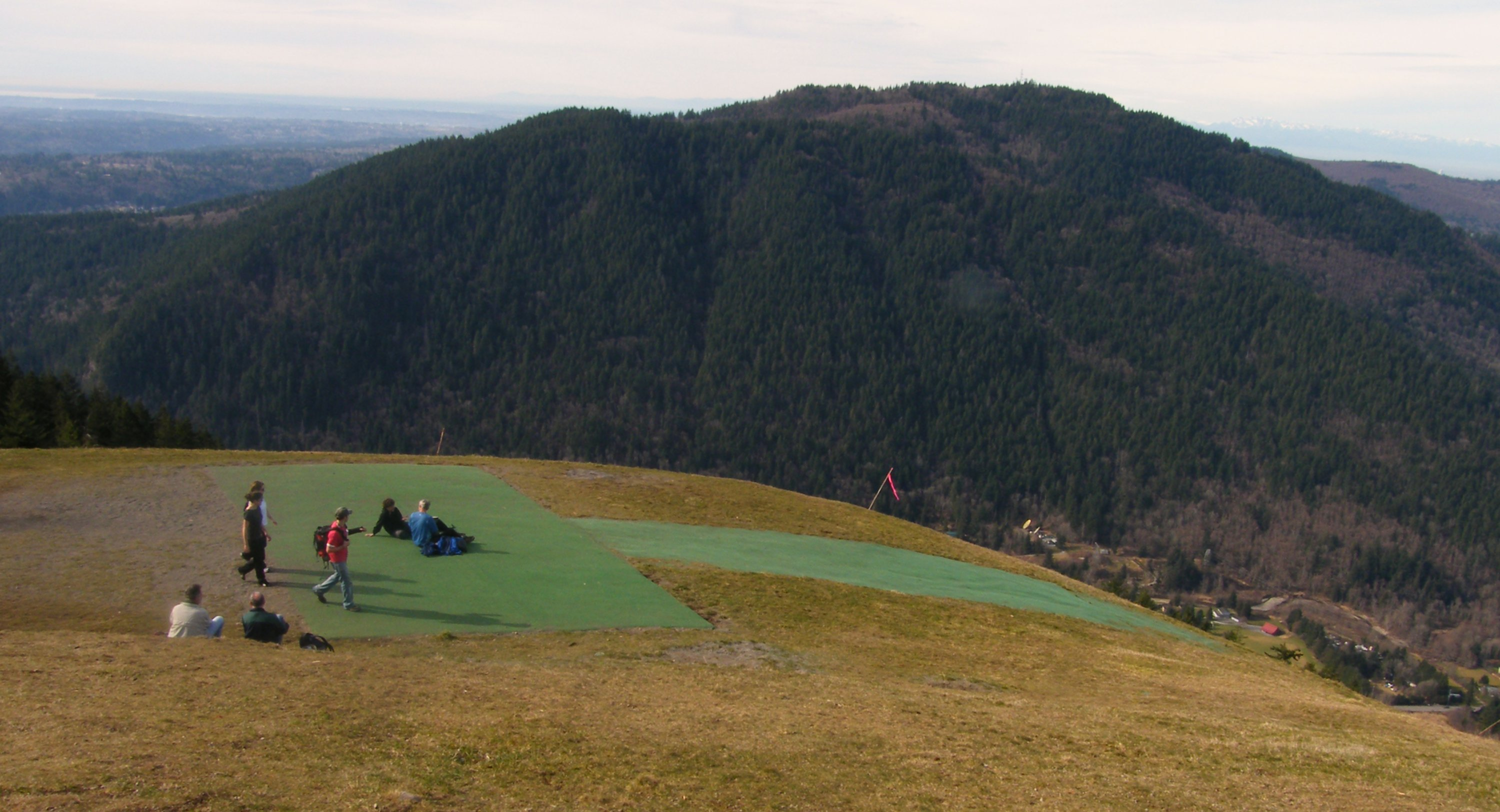
- Squak Mountain (Southeast and Central Peaks) as seen from Poo Poo Point (east)

Highest point
- Elevation: 2,028 ft (618 m)
- Prominence: 1,689 ft (515 m)
- Coordinates: 47°29′47″N 122°02′18″W

Geography
- Location: King County, Washington, U.S.
- Parent range: Issaquah Alps

Squak Mountain (Lushootseed: dexʷkayuʔalʔtxʷ) is the second most westerly mountain of the Issaquah Alps mountain chain in Washington state. It is situated between Cougar Mountain to the west and Tiger Mountain to the east. Interstate 90 parallels the base of the north side of the mountain. Much of the Squak Mountain watershed drains into Lake Sammamish. Most of the mountain is protected by Squak Mountain State Park and the Cougar/Squak and Squak/Tiger Corridors of King County.

Squak Mountain actually consists of three major peaks: the Central Peak (Elevation 2024 feet), the West Peak (Elevation 1995 feet), and the Southeast Peak (Elevation 1673 feet).

The name "Squak" comes from the Southern Lushootseed placename /sqʷásxʷ/, which is also the source of the name Issaquah Creek and the city of Issaquah.

== History ==
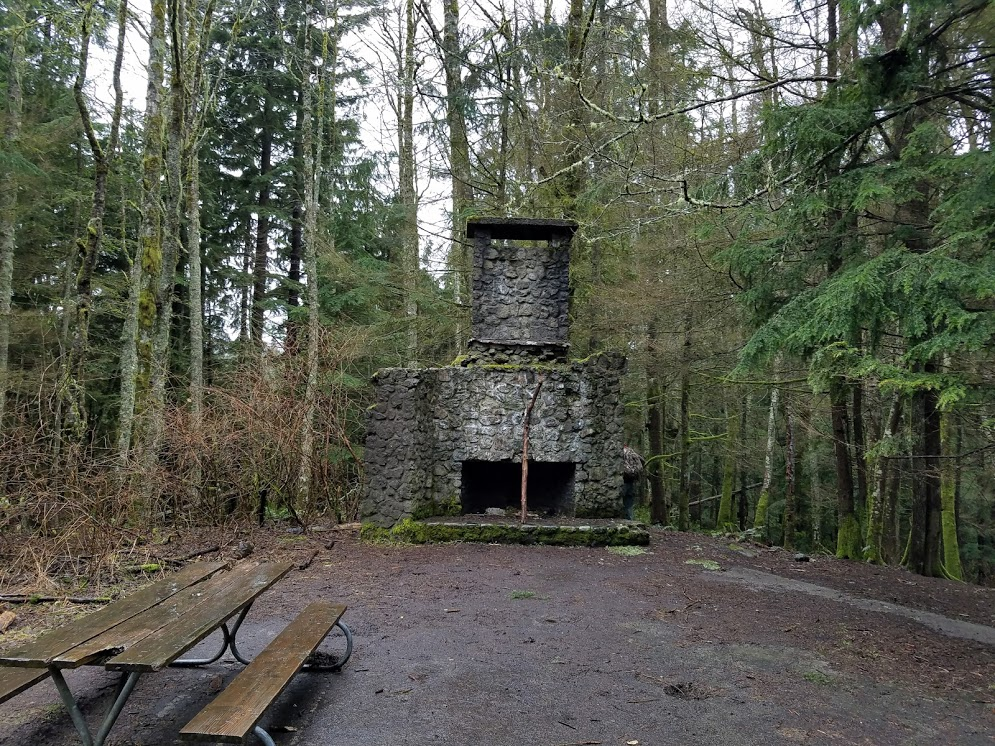
Remains of the Bullitt Family home located on Squak Mountain.

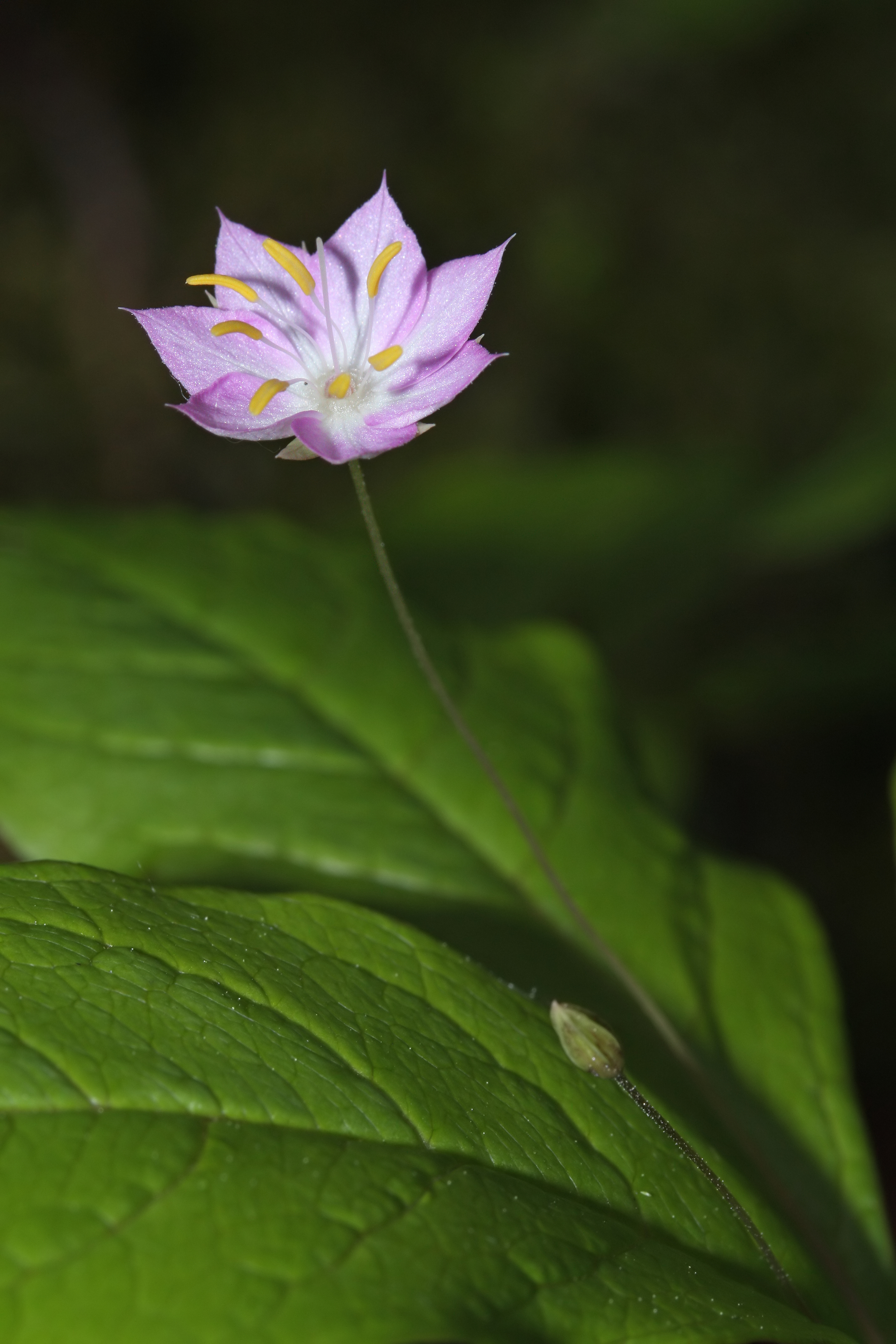
Trientalis latifolia (broadleaf starflower) is a native perennial herb found on Squak Mountain.

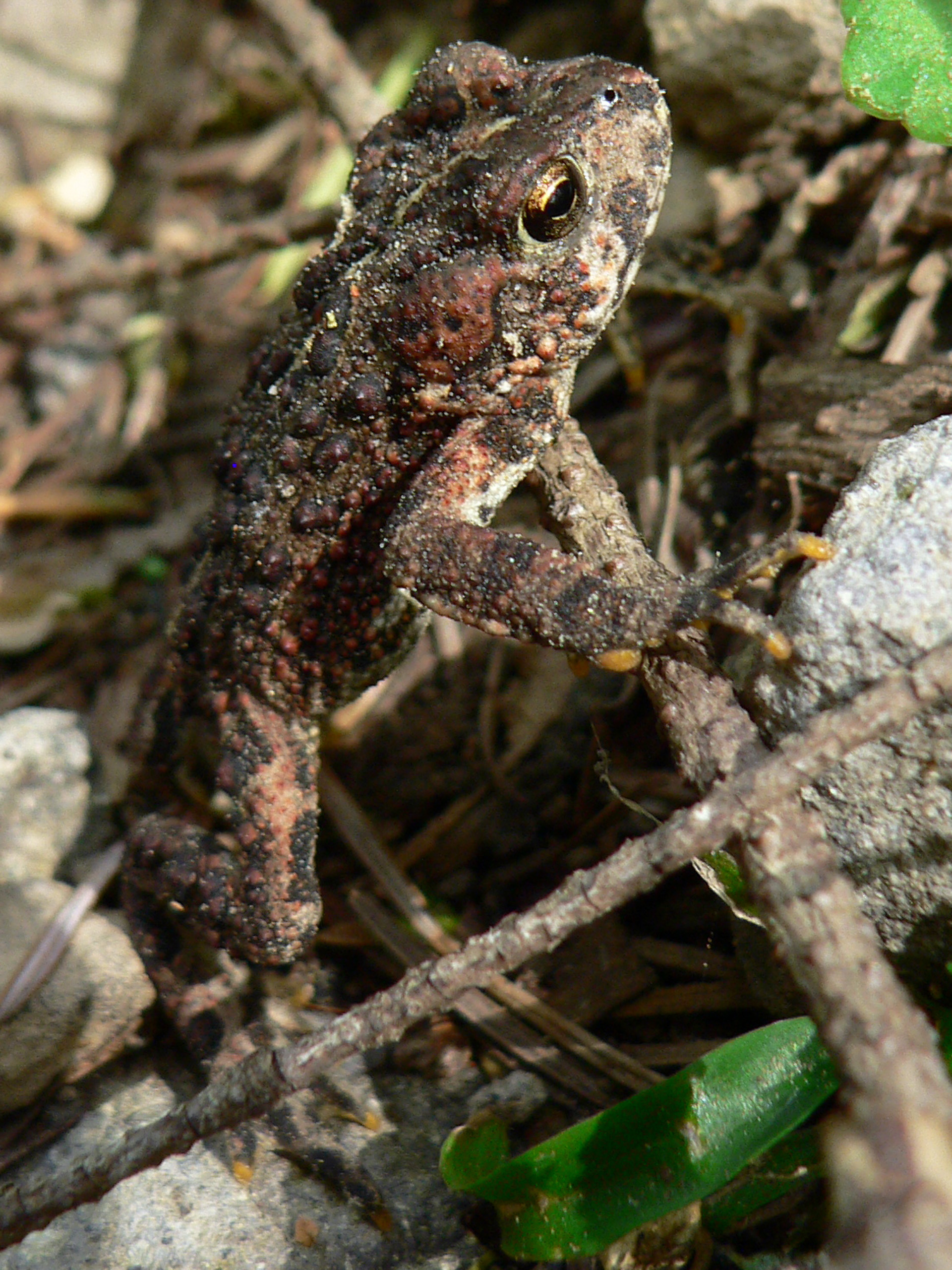
Bufo boreas (western toad) is a native amphibian found on Squak Mountain.

Squak Mountain first appears in the history of European settlement after the discovery of coal on the mountain in 1859. This helped fuel the establishment of the first commercial coal mine in Issaquah in 1862 and in Renton in 1863. While there is no longer coal mining on Squak Mountain, the dangers posed by abandoned mines are one reason it has been preserved from development.

Squak Mountain State Park was formed in 1972. The initial land grant of 590 acres to form the park was made by the Bullitt family. The initial grant was near the top and specified that the land remain in its natural state. These stipulations can still be seen today in the greater restrictions in park usage at the top of the mountain, on the original Bullitt family parcel. The remains of the Bullitt family home (just a foundation and fireplace) can be found in this original parcel.

Over time, the park has expanded to its current size of 1,545-acres through the acquisition of additional parcels of land.

While generally a quiet and safe park, there have been some incidents over the years:

- On January 15, 1953, during a heavy storm, a Flying Tiger Line DC-4 flying to Boeing field from Burbank, California, was blown off course, clipped trees near the summit and came down near a farm near the Issaquah-Hobart Road in a fiery crash that killed all on board. The fire was so intense it was four days before it burned itself out enough that rescuers could approach and recover the bodies.
- On May 4, 1991, Donna Barensten, who suffered from dementia, disappeared while hiking with her husband Ron in Squak Mountain State Park. Her body was found nearly one year later on April 27, 1992.
- On April 25, 2004, the body of Alena Stathopoulos, 29 was found on the Squak Mountain trail not far from SE May Valley Road by two hikers. Her roommate Esther Rose Havekost was convicted in December 2004 for murdering her in their shared apartment and for paying a man $10,000 to dump the body. She was sentenced to 27 months in prison.
- On August 7, 2011, Kenneth Blanchard, 53, an experienced paraglider, died after a rigging problem caused him to fall 40 to 50 feet to his death. He had launched from Poo Poo Point on Tiger Mountain with the intent of landing not at the Tiger Mountain Flight Park landing point, but instead in a pasture near his home in Renton, Washington. While flying over the High Valley neighborhood on the southwest side of Squak Mountain, his rigging experienced a catastrophic failure that caused him to fall to his death in a pasture.

== Park ==
The well-signed trail system consists mostly of abandoned roads that are narrowing to single-track trails, more so each year. One such road-trail leads to a foundation and fireplace that is the remnant of the Bullitt family summer home. Distant views are infrequent because of the forest. The major attraction of Squak Mountain is its urban wilderness.

=== Trails ===
Residential development in Issaquah extends to the park boundary at an elevation of about 1,100 feet (340 m). The park is accessed from a trailhead (elevation 740 ft or 230 m) at the hairpin turn of Mountainside Drive in the north, and the signed state park entrance on May Valley Road in the south (elevation 350 ft or 110 m). A lesser trailhead is found on the Renton-Issaquah Road on the west (elevation 400 ft or 120 m). Other trailheads may be reached via Sycamore Drive SE and Sunrise Place SE.
