= Cedar Butte (Washington) =

Mountain in Washington (state), United States

- Location within Washington (state) Location within the United States

Highest point
- Elevation: 1880+ ft (573+ m) NGVD 29
- Prominence: 400 ft (120 m)
- Coordinates: 47°26′02″N 121°44′31″W

Geography
- Location: King County, Washington, U.S.
- Parent range: Cascades
- Topo map: USGS Chester Morse Lake

Cedar Butte is a small forested mountain south of North Bend, Washington, east of Rattlesnake Lake, at the foot of Mount Washington. A low-impact path from the Iron Horse Trail leads to its summit.
