= Issaquah, Washington =

- City
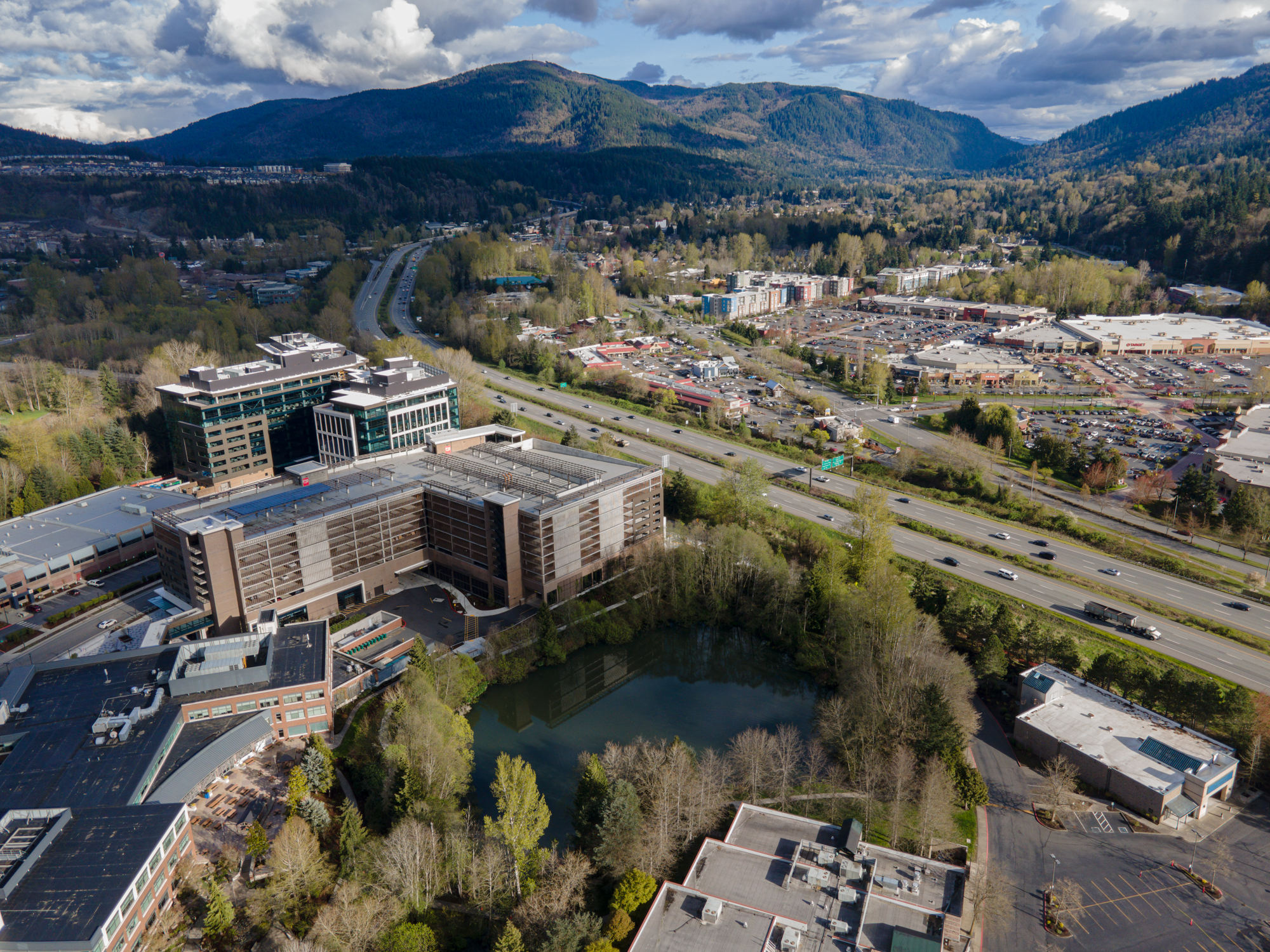
- Aerial view of Issaquah from the northwest

- Location of Issaquah, Washington

- Location in Washington Location in the USA
- Coordinates: 47°32′35″N 122°01′36″W
- Country: United States
- State: Washington
- County: King
- Incorporated: April 29, 1892

Government
  - Type: Mayor–council
  - Mayor: Mark Mullet

Area
  - Total: 13.18 sq mi (34.14 km^{2})
  - Land: 12.13 sq mi (31.42 km^{2})
  - Water: 1.05 sq mi (2.72 km^{2})
- Elevation: 62 ft (19 m)

Population (2020)
  - Total: 40,051
  - Estimate (2024): 39,664
  - Density: 3,301/sq mi (1,275/km^{2})
- Time zone: UTC-8 (Pacific (PST))
  - Summer (DST): UTC-7 (PDT)
- ZIP codes: 98027, 98029, 98075
- Area code: 425
- FIPS code: 53-33805
- GNIS feature ID: 2410123
- Website: issaquahwa.gov

Issaquah (/ˈɪsəkwɑː/ ISS-ə-kwah) is a city in King County, Washington, United States. The population was 40,051 at the 2020 census. Located in a valley and bisected by Interstate 90, the city is bordered by the Sammamish Plateau to the north and the "Issaquah Alps" to the south. It is home to the headquarters of the multinational retail company Costco Wholesale Corporation. Issaquah is included in the Seattle metropolitan area.

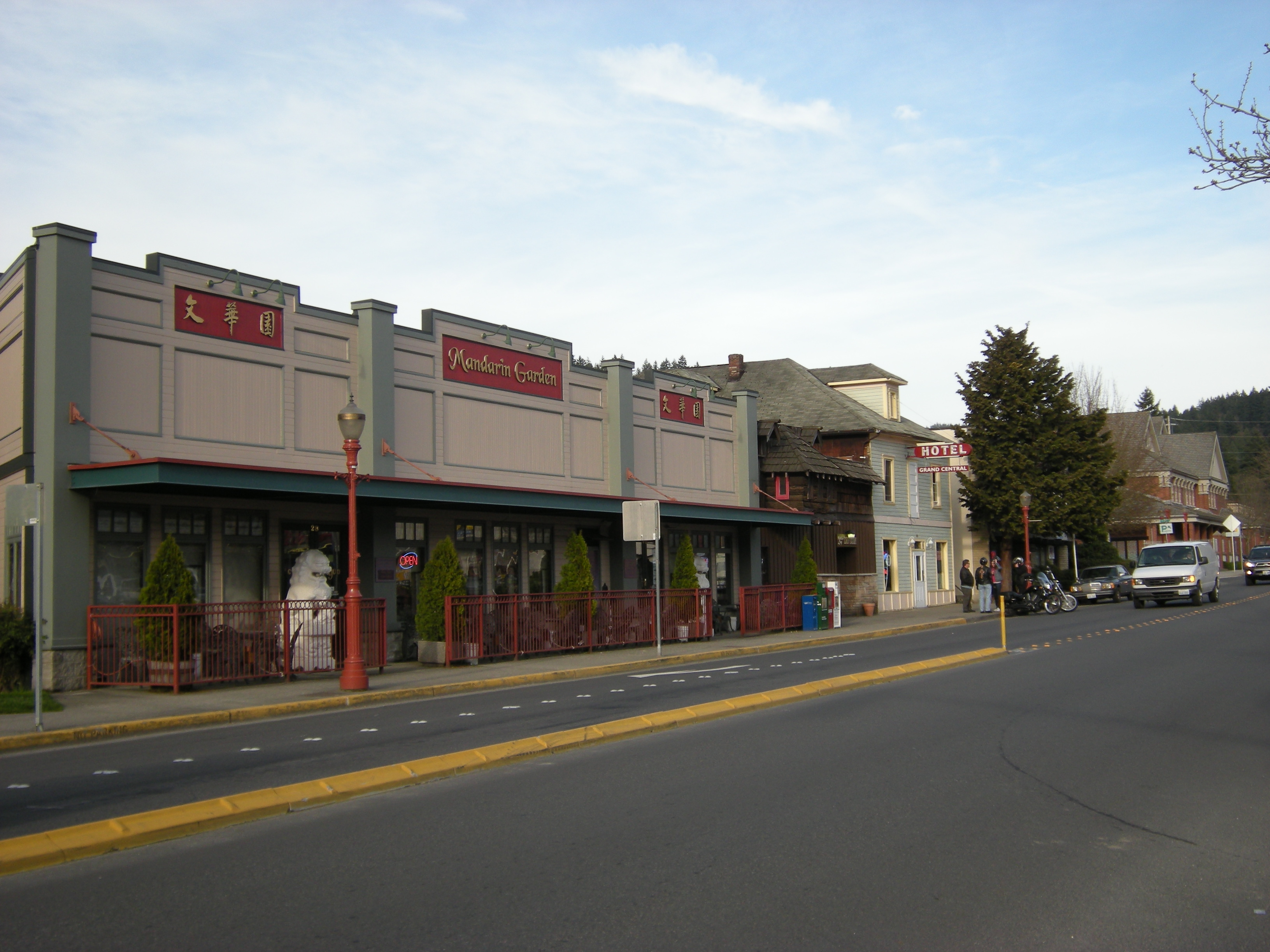
Sunset Way in downtown Issaquah

== History ==
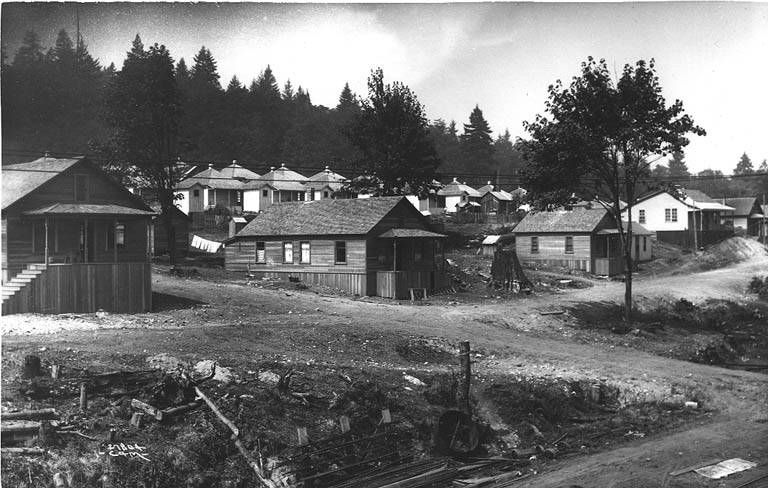
Coal miners' homes in Issaquah, 1913

"Issaquah" is an anglicization of the Southern Lushootseed placename /sqʷáxʷ/, meaning either "the sound of birds", "snake", or "little stream". "Squak Valley", an older name for the area, also derives from this same Native American name.

In September 1885, the then-unincorporated area was the scene of an attack on Chinese laborers who had come to pick hops from local fields. Three of the laborers died from gunshot wounds; seven attackers were indicted, but they were later acquitted or charges were dropped.

Shortly after becoming known as Squak, the town was briefly renamed to Gilman, an homage to Daniel Hunt Gilman, who brought railways to the town.

The city was officially incorporated by the Washington State legislature on April 29, 1892. Initially a small mining town, the city has changed noticeably both in its appearance and economic focus. Issaquah was originally developed to service the mining industry (on the two nearby mountains that now lend their names to the Cougar/Squak Corridor Park). As the mining deposits neared depletion in the late 1890s, other companies started to realize Issaquah's potential to support a lucrative lumber business. These companies exported timber from Issaquah and other small, local towns to Seattle and larger, rapidly growing communities throughout western Washington. These early boom industries, however, faded into a period of relative quiet by the time of the Great Depression.

The town's industries remained similar through most of the twentieth century, with Boeing providing the majority of employment in the area. Microsoft and other technological industries moved into Redmond and other cities in the area, and later established operations in Issaquah itself. In June 1996, Costco moved its global headquarters to Issaquah from nearby Kirkland.

== Geography ==
Issaquah is located 15 miles (24 km) east-southeast of Seattle at the south end of Lake Sammamish. Its neighboring cities are Bellevue to the west and Sammamish to the north. Issaquah resides within the Mountains to Sound Greenway.

According to the United States Census Bureau, the city has a total area of 11.40 square miles (29.53 km^{2}), of which 11.38 square miles (29.47 km^{2}) are land and 0.02 square miles (0.05 km^{2}) are water.

Issaquah is surrounded on three sides by what are known locally as the Issaquah Alps: Cougar Mountain on the west, Squak Mountain to the south, and Tiger Mountain to the southeast. To the north of Issaquah is Lake Sammamish. Cougar and Squak Mountains are home to sizable neighborhoods on their lower slopes, though the bulk of all three mountains are preserved in public ownership as Squak Mountain State Park, Cougar Mountain Regional Wildland Park, West Tiger Mountain NRCA, and Tiger Mountain State Forest. Geologists have noted the chemical and geological content of these three mountains to be much different from that of the Cascade Range, because they are not volcanic in origin, while the entire Cascade Range is postulated to have formed from volcanic action. They believe that these three mountains are the remains of a much older mountain range long since eroded by earthquakes, volcanic action, and shifting plates.

=== Climate ===
Issaquah has a warm-summer Mediterranean climate (Köppen: Csb) with chilly, extremely wet winters and warm, moderately humid summers. Although there is no dry season in Issaquah, winters are many times wetter than the summers. Rainfall amounts are extremely similar to the neighboring city of Sammamish, which is 0.06 inches wetter overall, with the same summer rain amounts.

Climate data for Issaquah, Washington
| Month | Jan | Feb | Mar | Apr | May | Jun | Jul | Aug | Sep | Oct | Nov | Dec | Year |
|---|---|---|---|---|---|---|---|---|---|---|---|---|---|
| Record high °F (°C) | 67 (19) | 75 (24) | 79 (26) | 90 (32) | 97 (36) | 108 (42) | 100 (38) | 102 (39) | 98 (37) | 95 (35) | 75 (24) | 67 (19) | 108 (42) |
| Mean daily maximum °F (°C) | 47 (8) | 50 (10) | 54 (12) | 58 (14) | 64 (18) | 69 (21) | 75 (24) | 76 (24) | 70 (21) | 60 (16) | 51 (11) | 45 (7) | 60 (16) |
| Mean daily minimum °F (°C) | 36 (2) | 35 (2) | 37 (3) | 40 (4) | 46 (8) | 51 (11) | 54 (12) | 53 (12) | 48 (9) | 43 (6) | 38 (3) | 34 (1) | 43 (6) |
| Record low °F (°C) | −1 (−18) | −3 (−19) | 8 (−13) | 24 (−4) | 26 (−3) | 31 (−1) | 36 (2) | 35 (2) | 30 (−1) | 23 (−5) | 2 (−17) | 3 (−16) | −3 (−19) |
| Average precipitation inches (mm) | 8.85 (225) | 5.61 (142) | 6.26 (159) | 4.81 (122) | 4.01 (102) | 2.94 (75) | 1.37 (35) | 1.29 (33) | 2.85 (72) | 5.69 (145) | 10.12 (257) | 8.45 (215) | 62.19 (1,580) |
| Average snowfall inches (cm) | 2.9 (7.4) | 3.1 (7.9) | 1.2 (3.0) | 0 (0) | 0 (0) | 0 (0) | 0 (0) | 0 (0) | 0 (0) | 0 (0) | 1.6 (4.1) | 2.8 (7.1) | 11.6 (29) |
Source: Weather.com

== Economy ==
Warehouse retailer Costco has been headquartered in Issaquah since 1996. Other major Issaquah employers include Microsoft, Siemens Medical Solutions' Ultrasound Group, Overtime Technologies, Boehm's Candies, and Darigold. Apparel wholesaler SanMar is also headquartered in the city. A large gravel quarry, operated by Lakeside Industries, is located on 120 acres (49 ha) immediately north of downtown Issaquah. It is planned to be redeveloped into a residential and commercial neighborhood over a 30-year period as quarry operations are phased out.

== Demographics ==
Historical population
| Census | Pop. | Note | %± |
|---|---|---|---|
| 1900 | 700 | | — |
| 1910 | 628 | | −10.3% |
| 1920 | 791 | | 26.0% |
| 1930 | 763 | | −3.5% |
| 1940 | 812 | | 6.4% |
| 1950 | 955 | | 17.6% |
| 1960 | 1,870 | | 95.8% |
| 1970 | 4,313 | | 130.6% |
| 1980 | 5,536 | | 28.4% |
| 1990 | 7,786 | | 40.6% |
| 2000 | 11,212 | | 44.0% |
| 2010 | 30,434 | | 171.4% |
| 2020 | 40,051 | | 31.6% |
| 2024 (est.) | 39,664 | | −1.0% |
U.S. Decennial Census; 2020 Census

According to a 2021 estimate, the median income for a household in the city was $132,984, and the median income for a family was $115,814. The per capita income for the city was $78,581.

According to the Washington State Office of Financial Management, Issaquah ranked 6th of 279 eligible incorporated communities in population growth between 2000 and 2005. Forbes.com ranked Issaquah the 2nd fastest-growing suburb in the state and the 89th in the nation.

=== 2020 census ===
As of the 2020 census, Issaquah had a population of 40,051. The median age was 37.9 years. 23.4% of residents were under the age of 18 and 14.2% of residents were 65 years of age or older. For every 100 females there were 91.8 males, and for every 100 females age 18 and over there were 88.4 males age 18 and over. This continued the population increase recorded in earlier censuses.

99.6% of residents lived in urban areas, while 0.4% lived in rural areas.

There were 16,444 households in Issaquah, of which 34.2% had children under the age of 18 living in them. Of all households, 52.7% were married-couple households, 15.3% were households with a male householder and no spouse or partner present, and 26.0% were households with a female householder and no spouse or partner present. About 27.8% of all households were made up of individuals and 11.3% had someone living alone who was 65 years of age or older.

There were 17,303 housing units, of which 5.0% were vacant. The homeowner vacancy rate was 1.1% and the rental vacancy rate was 4.5%.

Racial composition as of the 2020 census
| Race | Number | Percent |
|---|---|---|
| White | 23,957 | 59.8% |
| Black or African American | 799 | 2.0% |
| American Indian and Alaska Native | 129 | 0.3% |
| Asian | 10,379 | 25.9% |
| Native Hawaiian and Other Pacific Islander | 67 | 0.2% |
| Some other race | 985 | 2.5% |
| Two or more races | 3,735 | 9.3% |
| Hispanic or Latino (of any race) | 2,852 | 7.1% |

=== 2010 census ===
As of the 2010 census, there were 30,434 people, 12,841 households, and 8,018 families residing in the city. The population density was 2,674.3 inhabitants per square mile (1,032.6/km^{2}). There were 13,914 housing units at an average density of 1,222.7 per square mile (472.1/km^{2}). The racial makeup of the city was 74.7% White, 1.4% African American, 0.4% Native American, 17.5% Asian, 0.1% Pacific Islander, 1.8% from other races, and 4.1% from two or more races. Hispanic or Latino of any race made up 5.8% of the population.

For the same census period, there were 12,841 households, of which 33.0% had children under the age of 18 living with them, 51.9% were married couples living together, 7.9% had a female householder with no husband present, 2.7% had a male householder with no wife present, and 37.6% were non-families. 30.1% of all households were made up of individuals, and 10.9% had someone living alone who was 65 years of age or older. The average household size was 2.34, and the average family size was 2.95.

The median age in the city was 36.8 years. 23.7% of residents were under the age of 18; 5.5% were between the ages of 18 and 24; 35.5% were from 25 to 44; 22.6% were from 45 to 64; and 12.7% were 65 years of age or older. The gender makeup of the city was 47.7% male and 52.3% female.

== Transportation ==
=== Highways and roads ===
Issaquah is bisected by Interstate 90, which runs from Seattle to Boston, and Washington State Route 900, which connects the city to neighboring Renton. There is a chronic traffic congestion on Front Street, which traverses the historic downtown and carries 20,000 daily vehicle trips; in addition to local trips, the street also connects commuters from outside the city to Interstate 90. A proposed bypass of Front Street was included in the city's 1995 comprehensive plan and studied in a 2008 ahead of a plan to begin construction. Opponents of the bypass argued that the project would encourage more housing sprawl in the area beyond downtown and fail to solve traffic congestion issues on Front Street. The city council voted to cancel the project in 2008.

=== Public transportation ===
Bus service in Issaquah is provided by King County Metro and Sound Transit Express routes to Bellevue, Mercer Island, North Bend, and Redmond. There are two primary park-and-rides in the city: Issaquah Transit Center near downtown, with 428 spaces; and Issaquah Highlands Park & Ride, with 1010 spaces. Trailhead Direct, a seasonal service from Seattle and Bellevue to the Issaquah Alps and other hiking areas, is operated by Metro during the summer months. Issaquah had direct express bus service to Downtown Seattle provided by both Metro and Sound Transit Express until Fall 2026, when those express buses were truncated to Link light rail stations on the 2 Line in Bellevue and Mercer Island.

As part of the expansion of Sound Transit services, a Link light rail line to Issaquah from Bellevue is proposed to begin service by 2050. The 4 Line is planned to terminate in Issaquah and was funded by the Sound Transit 3 ballot measure, which was passed by voters in 2016. The 12-mile (19 km) project is expected to cost $2 billion.

In August 1995, the city and King County Metro launched a fare-free shuttle service between business districts and community centers in Issaquah known as Route 200 as a form of traffic congestion relief. After it was temporarily suspended during COVID-19, it has never returned.

== Local attractions ==
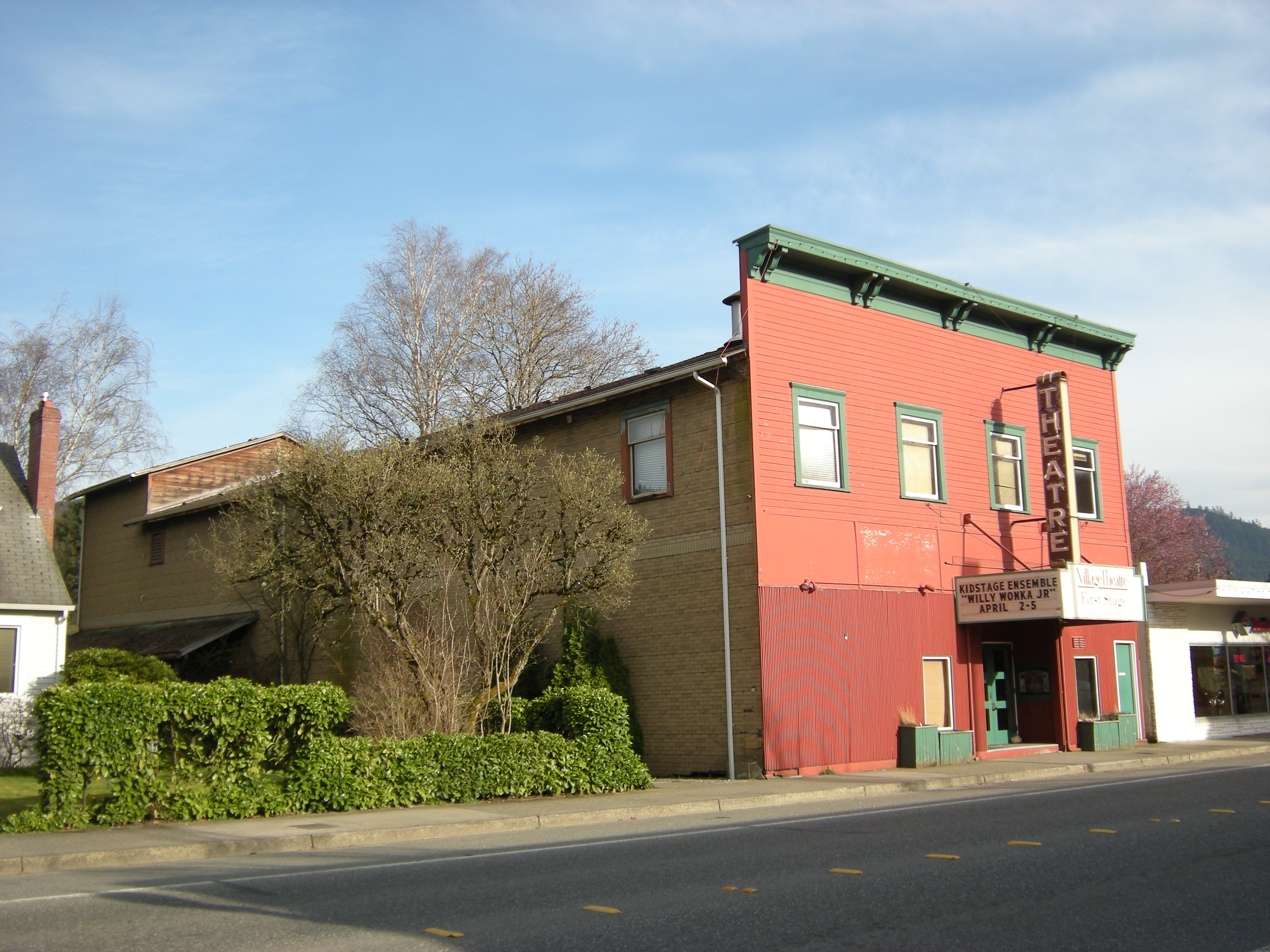
Village Theatre's First Stage, Issaquah

=== Issaquah Alps ===
The Issaquah Alps are a range of highlands situated around the city of Issaquah that include hiking trails and other outdoor activities. It is primarily composed of three distinct peaks: Tiger Mountain, Cougar Mountain, and Squak Mountain. Paragliders and hang gliders launch from Poo Poo Point on Tiger Mountain in the Issaquah Alps. Several popular trailheads in the area are served by Trailhead Direct, a shuttle bus service managed by King County Metro.

=== Issaquah Valley Trolley ===
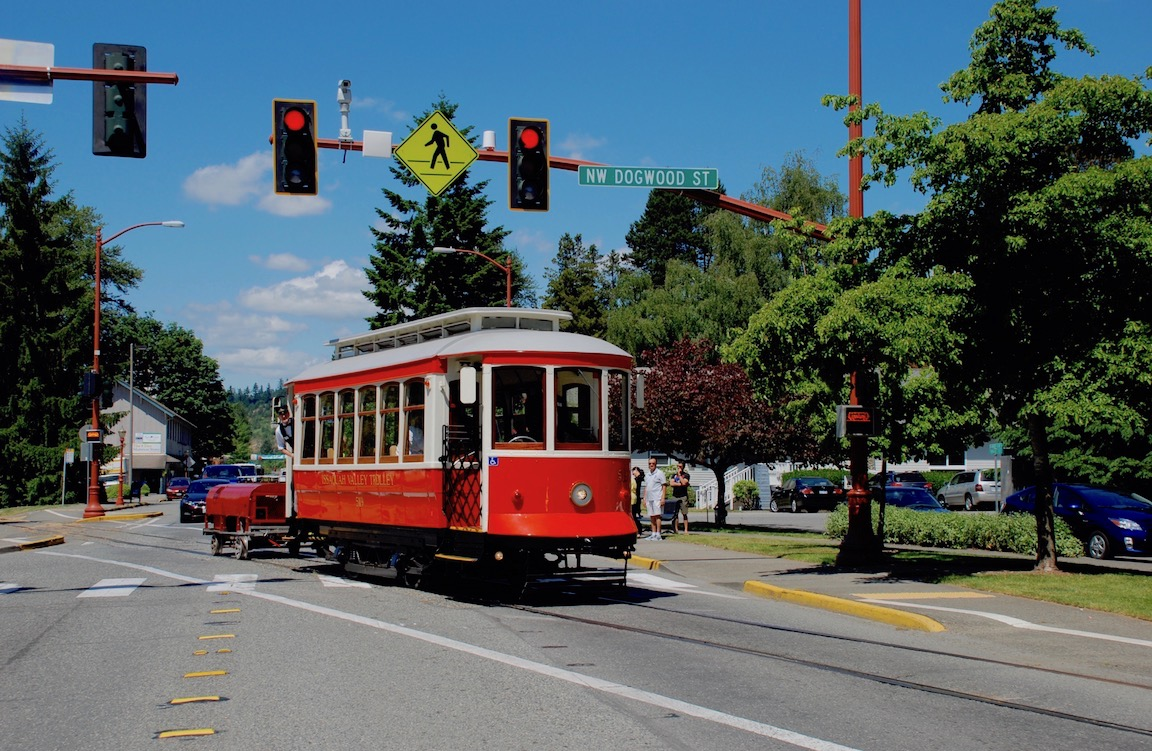
Issaquah Valley Trolley car crossing Front Street

The Issaquah Valley Trolley is a heritage trolley service operated by the Issaquah Historical Society on a section of the city's remaining railroad tracks from the Issaquah Depot to Gilman Village. A pilot was organized from 2001 to 2002 with cars borrowed from Yakima Valley Trolleys and followed by the Issaquah Historical Society's acquisition of their own three cars in 2010. Regular public rides started in October 2012 and operated seasonally on weekends until November 2020, when it was discontinued because of increased costs and insufficient funding. It resumed operation in August 2026.

=== Village Theatre ===
The Village Theatre has presented live stage plays on its main stage in downtown Issaquah since 1979. It was originally located in a converted movie theater and later built its main stage at the Francis J. Gaudette Theatre in 1993. Village Theatre is an Equity theater and has an affiliated theater in Everett.

=== Salmon hatchery and festival ===
The Issaquah Salmon Hatchery on Issaquah Creek is a state-owned fish hatchery that was built in 1936 by the federal Works Project Administration. It annually raises about Chinook and Coho salmon and is the most visited hatchery in Washington with an estimated 350,000 visitors annually.

Issaquah Salmon Days is an annual two-day festival held in Issaquah during early October to celebrate the return of spawning salmon to the area. It includes a parade, arts and crafts conventions, live entertainment and music, and sporting events. In 2005, the register revealed over 400,000 people attended the Salmon Days Festival.

=== Cougar Mountain Zoo ===
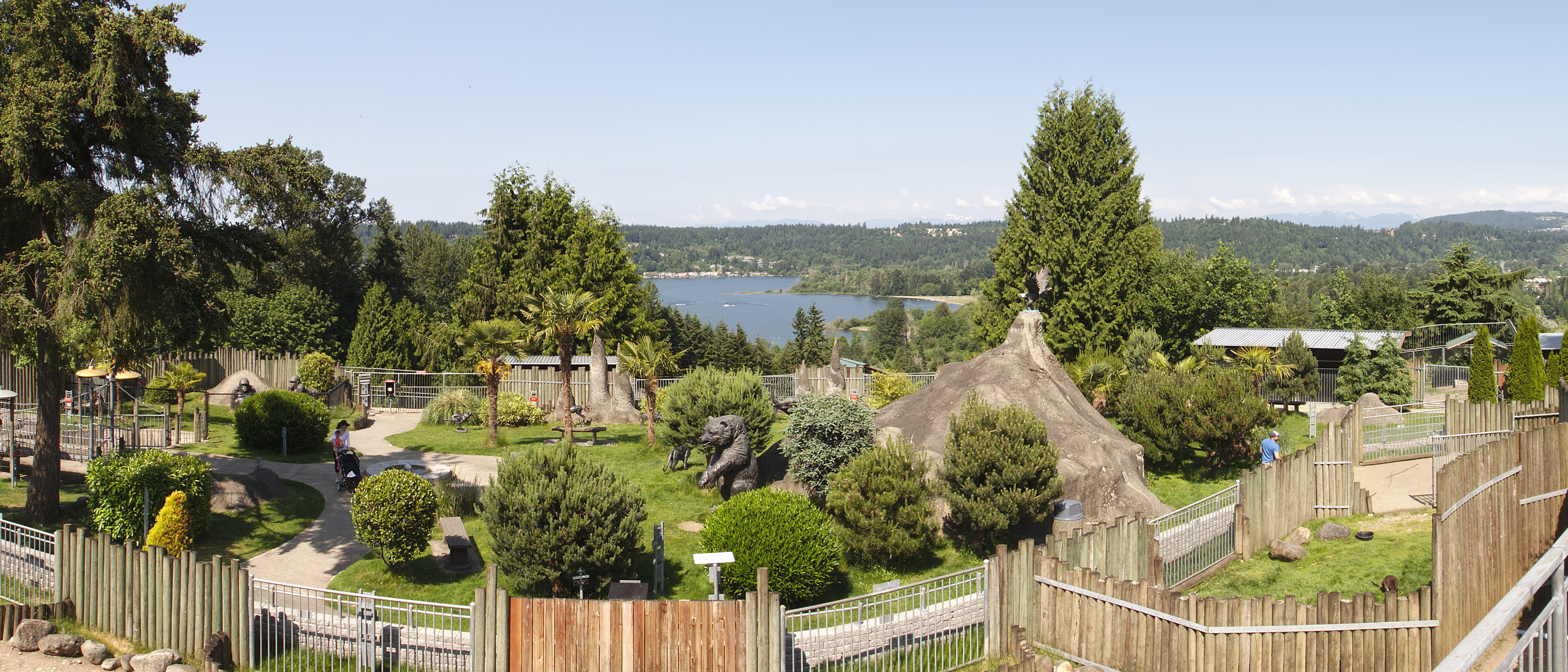
View of Lake Sammamish from the zoo

The Cougar Mountain Zoo is located on 8 acres (3.2 ha) west of Issaquah on the north slope of Cougar Mountain. The zoo was founded in 1972 and is home to many endangered birds and animals, as well as cougars, lemurs, reindeer, and wallabies. In 2007, the zoo added two Bengal tiger cubs who had been raised in a Florida preserve.

=== Gilman Village ===
Gilman Village is a shopping center created in 1972 from historic residential and commercial buildings that were moved and renovated for use as independent shops and restaurants. The complex has 27 buildings with various businesses, including specialty shops. The shopping center was designed by Baylis Architects, Richard Haag Associates, and landscape architect Stephen G. Ray.

=== High Alpine Chapel ===
The High Alpine Chapel opened in 1981 on the grounds of the Boehm's candy shop near downtown Issaquah. It was designed to resemble a 12th-century Swiss church and can hold 57 people. The chapel includes a memorial to deceased mountaineers.

=== Parks and recreation ===
The city's Parks and Community Services department operates the Issaquah Community Center and the Julius Boehm Pool, a municipal pool that opened in 1972. Its Adaptive Recreation program offers social, enrichment, and sports activities, including Special Olympics, for people in the Issaquah area with intellectual, developmental, physical, or neurological disabilities. Program staff lead and supervise groups but do not provide one-on-one support; a personal attendant may accompany a participant at no charge.

== Government ==
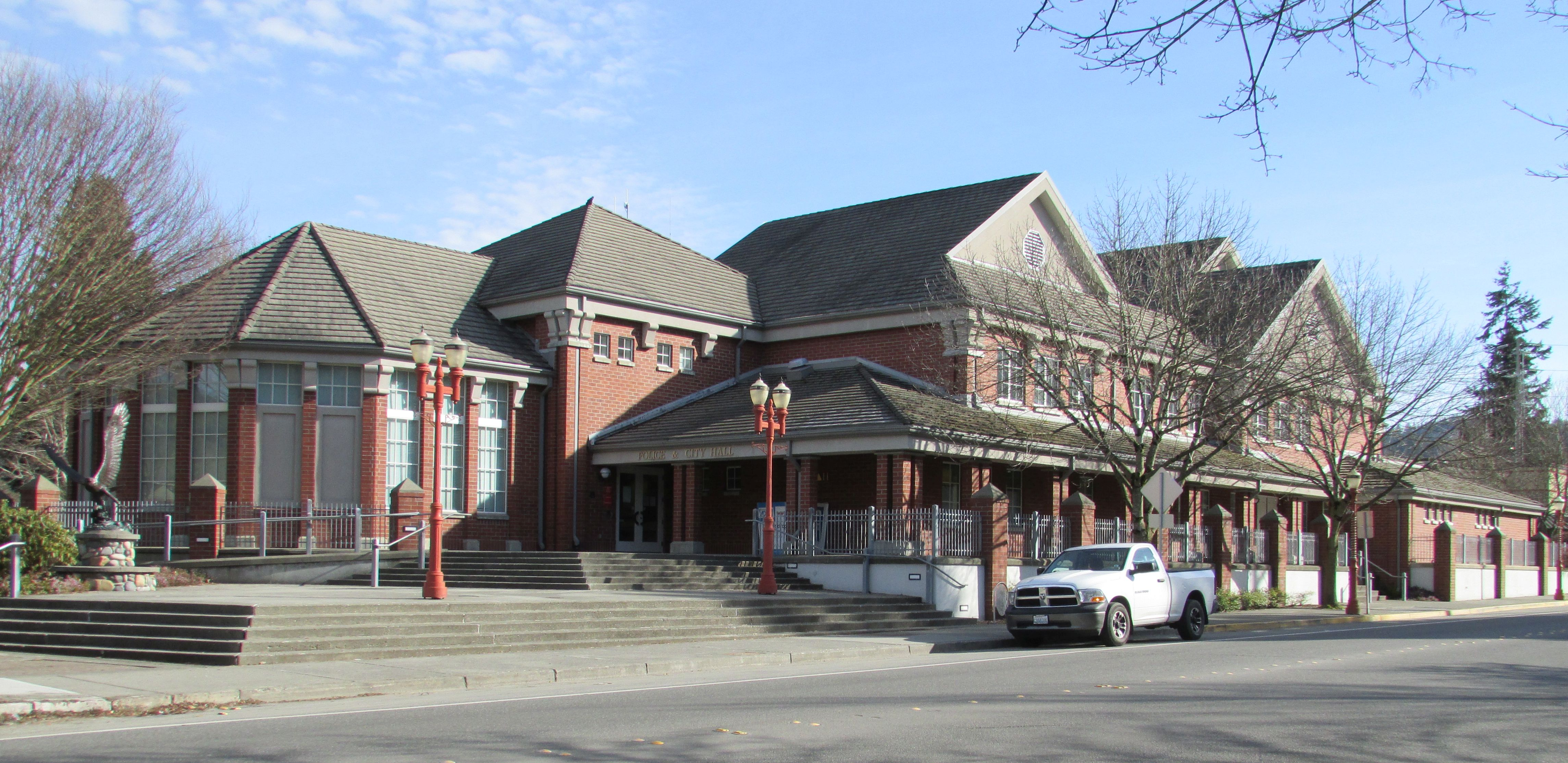
Issaquah City Hall

The City of Issaquah uses the mayor-council form of government. The City Council acts as the legislative body. The City Council consists of seven councilmembers, who each have four-year terms in staggered tranches.

Mary Lou Pauly was elected mayor of Issaquah in 2017 with 64.19% of the vote. She was re-elected in 2021 to another term.

In 2023, Issaquah became the first Washington city to be awarded LEED Gold certification for its environmental conservation and sustainability initiatives.

== Education ==
Public education for 21,358 students within the city and surrounding area is provided by the Issaquah School District, which operates 28 schools in and around Issaquah. This school district includes the southern part of Sammamish with the zip code 98075, while Lake Washington School District operates the northern part of Sammamish with the zip code 98074. This area also includes the northern part of Renton.

== Healthcare ==
Swedish Medical Center opened a full-service hospital and healthcare facility in the Issaquah Highlands with a capacity of 175 inpatient beds and a 24-hour emergency room in November 2011. The campus also includes medical offices and specialty care facilities. Bellevue-based Overlake Hospital Medical Center also petitioned the state government to open a hospital in Issaquah, but lost to Swedish's bid.

== Notable people ==
- Stella Alexander, first female mayor
- Ray Allen, former basketball player for the Seattle SuperSonics
- Cody Baker, soccer player
- Brian Basset, comic strip artist
- Isaac Brock, musician and songwriter for Modest Mouse
- Jay Buhner, former baseball player
- Deb Caletti, author
- David Call, actor
- Bryan Clay, Olympic decathlon athlete
- Colin Curtis, former baseball player
- Joseph C. Decuir, electrical engineer and IEEE fellow
- Brian Fennell, musician, singer and songwriter for SYML
- Cynthia Geary, actress
- Ken Griffey Jr., former baseball player for the Seattle Mariners
- Byron Howard, animated film director
- Margaret Larson, journalist
- Phil Lucas, documentary filmmaker
- Tyler Miller, baseball player
- Patrick Monahan, lead singer of rock band Train
- Jeff Nelson, baseball player
- Chris Pirillo, founder and maintainer of Lockergnome and host of Gnomedex and VloggerFair
- J. J. Putz, baseball player
- Nate Query, bassist for The Decemberists
- Rick Rizzs, baseball sportscaster for the Seattle Mariners
- Mark Rosewater, head designer of Magic: The Gathering
- Detlef Schrempf, basketball player
- Kyle Seager, baseball player for the Seattle Mariners
- Paul Sorrento, former baseball player for the Seattle Mariners
- Mel Stottlemyre, baseball pitching coach for the Seattle Mariners
- Ichiro Suzuki, former baseball player for the Seattle Mariners
- Dave Valle, former baseball player and sportscaster for the Seattle Mariners
- Omar Vizquel, baseball player
- Turner Wiley, marathon runner
- Brian Yorkey, playwright, lyricist, and theatre director

== Sister cities ==
- Sunndal, Norway
- Chefchaouen, Morocco (since 2007)

== See also ==
- Issaquah-Sammamish Reporter
