= KPTR (AM) =

Talk radio station in Seattle

- Seattle, Washington; United States
- Broadcast area: Seattle metropolitan area
- Frequency: 1090 kHz
- Branding: 1090 The Patriot

Programming
- Format: Conservative talk
- Network: 24/7 News
- Affiliations: KCPQ; Bloomberg Radio; Premiere Networks; Seattle Thunderbirds

Ownership
- Owner: iHeartMedia, Inc.; (iHM Licenses, LLC)
- Sister stations: KBKS-FM; KHHO; KJAQ; KJEB; KJR; KJR-FM; KZOK-FM

History
- First air date: 1927
- Former call signs: KGBS (1927–1928); KVL (1928–1936); KEEN (1936–1940); KEVR (1940–1947); KING (1947–1995); KINF (1995); KNWX (1995); KRPM (1995–1999); KMPS (1999); KYCW (1999–2004); KPTK (2004–2012); KFNQ (2012–2022)
- Call sign meaning: "Patriot"

Technical information
- Licensing authority: FCC
- Facility ID: 6387
- Class: B
- Power: 50,000 watts
- Transmitter coordinates: 47°23′37.4″N 122°25′29.5″W
- Repeater: 96.5 KJAQ-HD3 (Seattle)

Links
- Public license information: Public file; LMS
- Webcast: Listen live (via iHeartRadio)
- Website: 1090thepatriot.iheart.com

KPTR (1090 kHz) is a commercial AM radio station in Seattle, Washington. It airs a conservative talk format and is owned by iHeartMedia. The studios and offices are in the Belltown neighborhood northwest of Downtown Seattle.

KPTR is powered at 50,000 watts, the maximum for AM stations in the U.S., and is a Class B station. Because AM 1090 is a clear-channel frequency reserved for Class A stations WBAL in Baltimore and XEPRS in Rosarito-Tijuana, KPTR must use a directional antenna at all times to avoid interference. The transmitter is off Dockton Road SW on Vashon Island. KPTR also airs on the HD3 sub-channel of co-owned KJAQ.

== Programming ==
Most of KPTR's schedule is nationally syndicated talk shows. Weekdays begin with an hour of financial news from Bloomberg Radio. That's followed by The Glenn Beck Radio Program, The Clay Travis and Buck Sexton Show, The Sean Hannity Show, The Jesse Kelly Show, The Michael Berry Show, The Joe Pags Show, The Michael DelGiorno Show and Our American Stories with Lee Habeeb.

Weekends feature specialty shows, mostly from co-owned Premiere Networks, as well as repeats of weekday programs. Syndicated weekend shows include At Home with Gary Sullivan, Rich DeMuro on Tech, Bill Handel on the Law, The Mark Moss Show and The Ben Ferguson Show. Most hours begin with an update from 24/7 News.

== History ==
=== Early years ===
The station signed on the air in 1927 as KGBS. It is considered the third oldest radio station in Seattle, following KJR, which began broadcasting in 1922, and KOMO, now KNWN, which began in 1926. KIRO started broadcasting later in 1927, as KPCB.

The following year, KGBS changed its call sign to KVL. In the 1930s, it broadcast on 1370 kilocycles with only 100 watts of power. The studios were in the L.C. Smith Tower in downtown Seattle.

The call sign became KEEN in 1936 and KEVR in 1940. When the North American Regional Broadcasting Agreement (NARBA) took effect in 1941, KEVR moved to 1090 kHz. It got a boost to 250 watts, but still only a fraction of its current output. In the early 1940s, the station was owned by the Evergreen Broadcasting Company, with its studios still in Smith Tower.

=== KING ===
In 1947, broadcasting pioneer Dorothy Bullitt bought KEVR and almost immediately asked for permission to change the call sign to KING (for King County, Washington). Bullitt was a rare female executive in the male-dominated broadcasting industry. After Bullitt bought the call sign from a merchant ship, the FCC granted the request to change to KING a few months later. Bullitt incorporated her broadcast holdings as King Broadcasting Company.

In 1948, King Broadcasting acquired KRSC-TV and KRSC-FM, changing their call letters to KING-TV and KING-FM. KRSC-TV had only been on the air eight months before King Broadcasting took it over. KING-FM first signed on in 1947. After initially simulcasting KING (AM), KING-FM began adding classical music in the evening and eventually classical became its full-time format.

Under the Bullitts' watch, the once-small station became a powerhouse in Seattle during the 1950s and 1960s. The "Mighty 1090" featured legendary radio personalities such as Frosty Fowler, Ray Court, Mark Wayne, Buzz Lawrence, and late night talk with Irving Clark's Clark on King. The station was an affiliate of the NBC Radio Network. Its local news often used KING-TV anchors. The format of music was middle of the road (MOR), but also mixed in jazz, bossa nova and some swing. When compared to its chief rival KJR, KING had a light-hearted and upbeat direction, an opposition to KJR's more hip direction, but not being as staid as KIRO. Some late 1960s personalities defected to KIRO. Bob and Jim, a duo team, was brought in from KREM in Spokane, and personality Larry Nelson came aboard from KOMO.

=== Top 40 era ===
During the 1970s, the station flipped to top 40 music and changed monikers to "Musicradio 11 KING", putting it in close competition with KJR. The line-up at the time included such Seattle radio personalities as Gary Lockwood (who later defected to KJR) and Bruce Murdock, with the Murdock in the Morning Show. (Murdock later moved to KLSY.)

When KJR unveiled its yellow "Sunshine" window sticker, KING followed with its own red "Sunburst" sticker. KING-AM-FM-TV were located in studios on Aurora Avenue in Seattle.

=== Adult contemporary ===
In April 1980, KING experienced a major change. As AM music radio lost younger listeners to FM, KING gave up on top 40 and flipped to soft adult contemporary, while retaining the "Musicradio 11 KING" moniker. KING's slogan was "Soft Rock and More". The station's tagline used in advertising was "You grew up with us, now we've grown up for you".

=== Talk and all-news ===
On October 4, 1982, at 4 a.m., KING switched to a talk radio format, mostly with local personalities. It was branded simply as "KING NewsTalk 1090". Personalities included Jim Althoff, Carl Dombek, Jeff Ray, Randy Rowland, Freddy Mertz, Mike Siegel, Candace Siegel (no relation) and Pat Cashman. This format produced moderately high ratings, though never as successful as the top 40 format had been.

On September 2, 1994, at noon, the station fired all on-air personalities and switched to an all-news radio format, carrying programming from the AP News radio service "All News Radio."

In February 1995, the Bullitts sold KING AM-FM to Bonneville, the commercial broadcasting arm of the Church of Jesus Christ of Latter-day Saints, based in Salt Lake City. (The family had already sold KING-TV to the Providence Journal Company in 1991.) Bonneville, in turn, sold KING-AM-FM to EZ Communications later that year. The FM station was then sold by EZ to a non-profit organization that pledged to continue its classical music format as a commercial station. The TV and FM stations retained the KING call letters; for the AM station, the long-running KING call sign was dropped for KINF, followed by KNWX.

=== Country music ===
In November 1995, the station swapped formats (but not call signs) with KULL, which was a simulcast of country music station KRPM-FM 106.1. The 1090 facility became KRPM, an AM simulcast for KRPM-FM/KCIN-FM. The simulcast continued after KCIN's flip to rhythmic AC as KBKS-FM in March 1996, as well as the shift to Top 40 (CHR) in May 1997. EZ merged with American Radio Systems in July 1997; subsequently, Westinghouse/CBS bought American Radio Systems' stations (including KRPM) on September 19, 1997. In June 1998, CBS split off the radio division under the revived Infinity Broadcasting name, which would be renamed CBS Radio in December 2005.

On February 1, 1999, the station broke from the KBKS simulcast and flipped to a locally programmed classic country format with a simulcast of the morning show on sister KMPS-FM. At that time, the station's call letters became KMPS, and then KYCW. The station began broadcasting in AM stereo in March 2001.

=== Hot talk/back to classic country/progressive talk ===
Beginning August 4, 2001, the station ran announcements promoting a new format that advised listeners to "listen at their own risk". At 5 a.m. on Monday, August 6, the station flipped to hot talk as "Extreme Radio 1090" featuring Bob Rivers' Twisted Radio in mornings (simulcast from KZOK-FM). After morning drive time, the station aired nationally syndicated shows from Jim Rome, Ron and Fez, Opie & Anthony, Don and Mike and Phil Hendrie. On weekends, the station carried sports programming from Sporting News Radio. As with nearly all hot talk-formatted stations, the station's ratings were low, especially with the format change occurring a month before the September 11 attacks.

KYCW would return to classic country at 11 p.m. on May 19, 2002. The station's second version of the classic country format included the return of personalities previously heard the first time, including "Tall" Paul Fredericks, Mike Preston, program director Becky Brenner, "Buffalo" Phil Harper, and Sheldon Smith. The station, however, still had low ratings, usually peaking at a 1.3.

On October 25, 2004, at midnight, the station flipped to progressive talk and changed its call sign to KPTK days later. During its tenure as "Seattle's Progressive Talk", KPTK carried syndicated progressive/liberal talk programs hosted by personalities such as Ed Schultz, Mike Malloy, Randi Rhodes, Thom Hartmann, Norman Goldman, Rachel Maddow, Stephanie Miller, Leslie Marshall, and Bill Press. KPTK was also the flagship station of Air America Radio's Ron Reagan Show. Beginning in 2011, KPTK became the flagship station of Seattle Storm and Seattle Thunderbirds broadcasts, though it was met with some controversy. The station's weekend programming included a mix of specialty syndicated and local programs, such as The Ric Edelman Show (a financial advice show), Ring of Fire, Democracy Now!, Swirl Radio (a show targeting the LGBT community), Community Matters with CBS Seattle's director of public affairs and morning traffic reporter Lee Callahan, Gardening In the Northwest with Scott Conner, The Tina and Drew Show, and Crash Talk with Mike Harber.

=== Sports radio ===
In July 2012, CBS and Cumulus Media announced a new sports radio network named CBS Sports Radio to be launched in January 2013. The initial affiliate list that carried the network's full lineup included most of CBS' owned and operated low-performing AM stations, while others were CBS-owned sports stations that would carry certain programs and hourly "CBS Sports Minute" updates. After much speculation, on November 14, 2012, CBS announced that KPTK would flip to the new network on January 2, 2013, branded as "1090 The Fan". (This was further confirmed by the station changing call letters to KFNQ on the same day.)

The format change was met with much controversy on the station's Facebook page, as well as being brought up by several of the station's hosts. To please displaced listeners, Lakewood radio station KLAY announced that it would carry Ed Schultz' and Stephanie Miller's programs after the station's flip, as well as KBCS picking up Thom Hartmann's program.

After the station's flip to all-sports, KFNQ aired a local afternoon show hosted by Steve Sandmeyer and Bill Swartz (later replaced by Jason Churchill). However, on July 11, 2015, the show was cancelled, resulting in KFNQ airing the entire CBS Sports Radio program lineup around the clock.

=== iHeart ownership ===
On February 2, 2017, CBS Radio announced its merger with Entercom (which locally owned KHTP, KISW, KKWF, and KNDD). On October 10, CBS Radio announced that as part of the process of obtaining regulatory approval of the merger, KFNQ would be one of sixteen stations to be divested by Entercom, along with KJAQ and KZOK-FM. (KMPS-FM was retained by Entercom.)

On November 1, iHeartMedia announced its acquisition of KFNQ, KJAQ, and KZOK. To meet ownership limits set by the FCC, KFNY (formerly KFOO) and KTDD (formerly KUBE) were divested to the Ocean Stations Trust in order to be sold to a different owner. Until the completion of the divestment of KFNY and KTDD to the trust, CBS placed KFNQ, KJAQ, and KZOK into the Entercom Divestiture Trust. The merger of CBS and Entercom was approved on November 9, and was consummated on November 17. iHeart then began operating KFNQ under a local marketing agreement. The sale of KFNQ to iHeart was completed on December 19, 2017.

On February 8, 2018, the station dropped the "Fan" branding and relaunched as "1090 KJR", a brand extension of co-owned KJR. With the change, KFNQ added the syndicated Fox Sports Radio programs The Dan Patrick Show, The Herd with Colin Cowherd, and The Doug Gottlieb Show.

On March 16, 2022, the station changed callsigns to KPTR, foreshadowing a flip to conservative talk as "1090 The Patriot", which would occur on April 10. The new format would include conservative programming from Premiere Networks, such as The Clay Travis and Buck Sexton Show, the Glenn Beck Radio Program, and The Sean Hannity Show, with an early morning hour of financial news from Bloomberg Radio. KFNQ's former lineup of CBS Sports Radio and Fox Sports Radio programming was concurrently moved to KJR, whose local programming had migrated to KUBE as "93.3 KJR-FM" earlier in March.
