= KJAQ =

Adult hits radio station in Seattle

- Seattle, Washington; United States
- Broadcast area: Seattle metropolitan area/Puget Sound
- Frequency: 96.5 MHz (HD Radio)
- Branding: 96.5 Jack FM

Programming
- Format: Adult hits
- Subchannels: HD2: Alternative rock "Alt 96.5 HD2"; HD3: Conservative talk (KPTR simulcast)
- Affiliations: Jack FM network Seattle Kraken; Washington Huskies NCAAF

Ownership
- Owner: iHeartMedia; (iHM Licenses, LLC)
- Sister stations: KBKS-FM, KHHO, KJEB, KJR, KJR-FM, KPTR, KZOK-FM

History
- First air date: 1959 (as KLSN)
- Former call signs: KLSN (1959–1972); KYAC (1972–1977); KYYX (1977–1984); KKMI (1984–1985); KQKT (1985–1987); KXRX (1987–1994); KYCW (1994–1999); KYPT (1999–2003); KRQI (2003–2004); KRQI-FM (2004–2005)
- Call sign meaning: Pronounced as Jack

Technical information
- Licensing authority: FCC
- Facility ID: 1091
- Class: C
- ERP: 52,000 watts 70,000 watts (CP)
- HAAT: 696 meters (2,283 feet)
- Transmitter coordinates: 47.504556°N 121.968722°W; 47.504639°N 121.968833°W (CP and APP)

Links
- Public license information: Public file; LMS
- Webcast: Listen live (via iHeartRadio)
- Website: jackseattle.iheart.com

KJAQ (96.5 FM) is a commercial radio station in Seattle, Washington. KJAQ airs an adult hits music format branded as "Jack FM". It is owned by iHeartMedia. The studios and offices are in the Belltown neighborhood northwest of Downtown Seattle. The station's transmitter is on Tiger Mountain in Issaquah. KJAQ broadcasts in the HD Radio format. The HD-2 subchannel carries an alternative rock format and HD-3 simulcasts conservative talk KPTR, also owned by iHeart.

== History ==
=== Classical (1959–1973) ===
The station signed on the air in 1959 as KLSN. It was a classical music station broadcasting from the University Village Shopping Center, owned by a company called "Sight and Sound."

=== R&B (1973–1977) ===
In 1973, the station was acquired by Carl-Del, Inc., which also owned KYAC (1460 AM, now KARR), with the FM flipping to a simulcast of the AM station's R&B format, and changed call letters to KYAC-FM. The stations used the slogan "The Soul of the Sound," referring to Puget Sound.

=== Top 40 (1977–1982) ===
In February 1977, after O'Day Broadcasting bought the station, the call letters switched to KYYX. It carried a Top 40 format.

=== New wave (1982–1984) ===
In late 1982, the station shifted to new wave music. The station was called "96.5 The Wave" and featured radio personalities Mike "Beaver" Bell, Damien, Stephen Rabow, John Langan, and Van Johnson. The station's moniker was "The Rock of The 80s."

In December 1983, Madison Park Broadcasting acquired KYYX.

=== Soft adult contemporary (1984–1985) ===
On March 26, 1984, Madison Park announced that the station would change formats within a few months because of poor ratings and revenue. On May 13, after playing "Radio Radio" by Elvis Costello, KYYX signed off with a montage of station identifications and two customized songs based on "KYYX" for 5 minutes. After going dark for three weeks, the station would then flip to soft adult contemporary as KKMI.

=== Adult alternative (1985–1987) ===
In December 1984, Madison Park sold the station to Behan, who shifted the format to "Quality Rock KQ-96", KQKT, in May 1985. Shamrock Broadcasting bought the station in the Fall of 1986.

=== Album Rock (1987–1994) ===
On January 5, 1987, 96.5 flipped to KXRX, a personality-driven album rock station featuring Robin & Maynard in mornings, Larry Snyder middays, Crow & West afternoons, Beau Roberts evenings, and Scott Vanderpool overnights.

On April 8, 1994, the station was the first to report that a body had been found in the home of Kurt Cobain. The body would turn out to be Cobain's. An electrician working at the home found the body and called the station with the tip, hoping to win Pink Floyd concert tickets in exchange for the information.

Alliance Broadcasting bought the station from Shamrock in May 1994.

=== Country (1994–1999) ===
On June 25, 1994, KXRX began stunting with comedy routines. On June 29, at 5:30 p.m., the station began a robotic countdown that started at 40,000 and ended at 1. However, instead of ending the countdown at 1, it counted up to 40,000, then back to 1. On July 1, at 3 p.m., Alliance flipped the station to a country music format as "Young Country 96.5" with the call letters KYCW-FM. It was the third FM country station in the Seattle radio market, competing against KMPS-FM and KCIN.

Alliance merged with Infinity Broadcasting in September 1995. Shortly afterwards, Infinity sold KYCW to EZ Communications in February 1996, with KYCW joining KMPS and KCIN under common ownership. That prompted EZ to flip KCIN to Rhythmic AC the following month. EZ Communications was bought out by American Radio Systems in July 1997. Westinghouse/CBS bought American Radio Systems' stations (including KYCW) on September 19, 1997. In June 1998, CBS split off the radio division under the revived Infinity name, which would be renamed CBS Radio in December 2005.

=== '80s hits (1999–2003) ===
On December 17, 1999, Infinity flipped KYCW-FM to all-80s hits, branded as "96-5 The Point", and changed call letters to KYPT. “The Point” saw some initial success, but then declined in the ratings. In 2001, much of the on-air staff was fired, leading to rumors of a format change to adult contemporary. However, the station continued with its all-80's format and brought in a new air staff. Despite the changes, ratings continued to slip.

=== Classic alternative (2003–2005) ===
On December 19, 2003, at 5:00 p.m., after playing "Burning Down the House" by Talking Heads, KYPT flipped to classic alternative rock as "96-5 K-Rock." The call letters switched to KRQI on New Year's Day, 2004. The station played songs from artists such as Foo Fighters, Kid Rock, Iggy Pop, Red Hot Chili Peppers, R.E.M., U2, and Depeche Mode, as well as capitalizing on Seattle grunge acts such as Nirvana, Pearl Jam, Alice in Chains, and Soundgarden. It competed with the longer established alternative station KNDD. In advance of KRQI's debut, 29 hours earlier, KNDD adjusted to a gold-based Alternative format. KRQI brought in former KNDD personalities Andy Savage and Bill Reid for morning and afternoon drive time. Ratings for the station under this format were poor.

=== Adult hits (2005–present) ===
On April 22, 2005, at 10:00 a.m., after playing "Black" by Seattle band Pearl Jam, KRQI flipped to its current Adult Hits format as "96-5 Jack FM." The first song on Seattle's "Jack" was "Get the Party Started" by P!nk.

Jim Tripp was hired as the program director. The station's call letters were changed to KJAQ on May 7, 2005.

On February 2, 2017, CBS Radio announced it would merge with Entercom, which already owned four FM stations in Seattle (KHTP, KISW, KKWF, and KNDD). On October 10, CBS Radio announced that as part of the process of obtaining regulatory approval of the merger, KJAQ would be one of sixteen stations that would be divested by Entercom, along with sister stations KZOK and KFNQ. (Entercom would keep KMPS.)

On November 1, 2017, iHeartMedia announced that it would acquire KJAQ, KZOK, and KFNQ. To meet ownership limits set by the FCC, KFOO and KUBE were divested to the Ocean Stations Trust in advance of a sale to a different owner. Until the completion of the divestment of KFOO and KUBE to the trust, CBS placed KJAQ, KZOK, and KFNQ into the Entercom Divestiture Trust. The merger of CBS and Entercom was approved on November 9, and the deal was consummated on November 17. The sale of KJAQ to iHeartMedia was officially completed on December 19, 2017.

On March 3, 2021, the National Hockey League expansion team Seattle Kraken announced a multi-year broadcast agreement with iHeart; as part of the deal, KJAQ was announced to simulcast a yet-undetermined number of games with KJR.

On March 8, 2021, the station was branded as "96-5 Jill FM" under the slogan "Playing What SHE Wants" to celebrate International Women’s Day.

== HD radio ==
- 96.5-HD1 carries the analog format ("96-5 Jack FM") from the standard 96.5 FM frequency.
- 96.5-HD2 carries an alternative rock format known as "Alt 96-5 HD2", transferred from former sister station KFOO.
- 96.5-HD3 carries a simulcast of conservative talk-formatted KPTR 1090 AM.
