= Adrian Hill (American football official) =

American football official

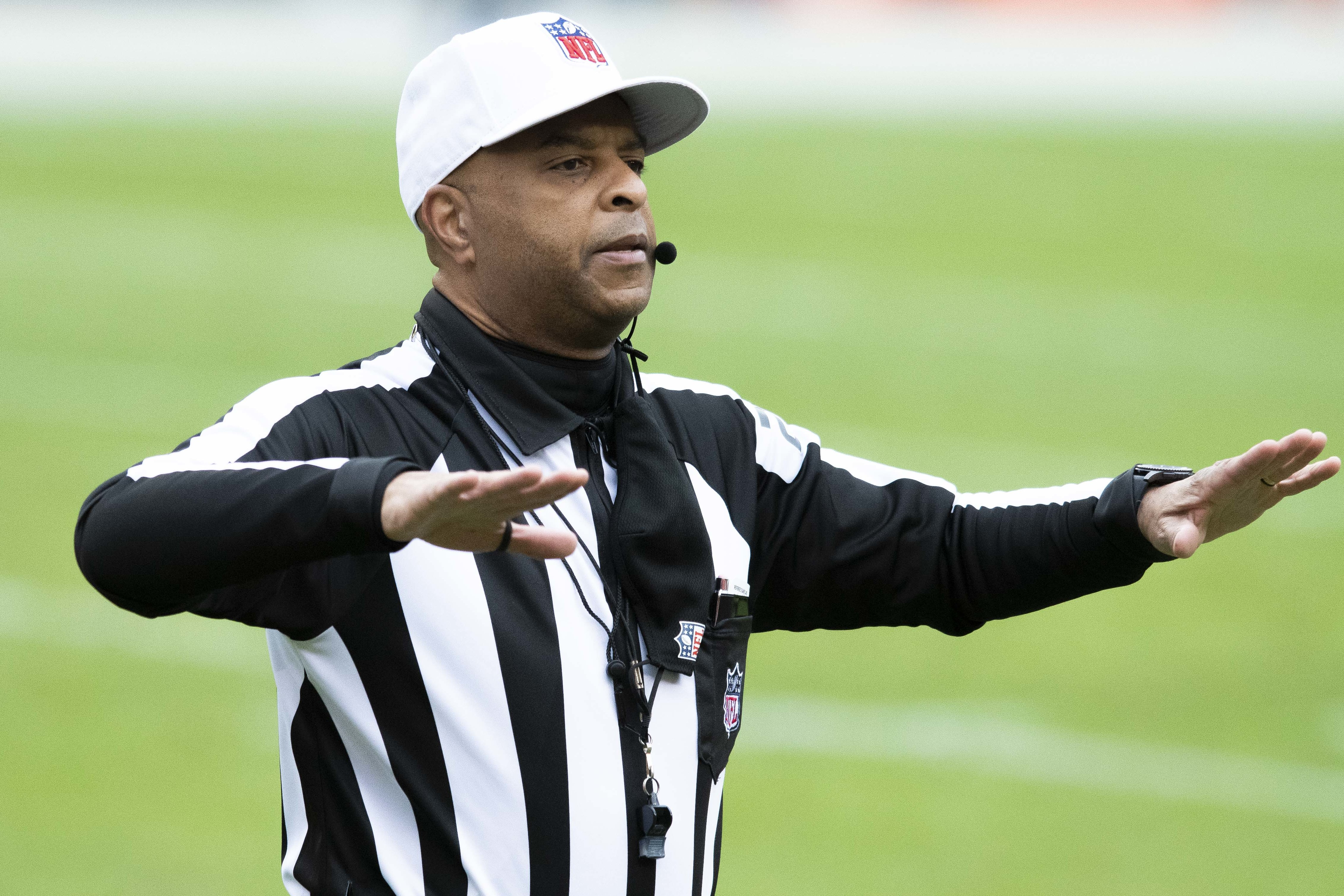
- Hill in 2020
- Born: 1964 (age 61–62); Washington, D.C., U.S.
- Education: University at Buffalo (BS); Johns Hopkins University (MS)
- Occupations: NFL official (2010–present); College football official (2004–2009); Aerospace software engineer (1990s–present)

Tracy Adrian Hill (born 1964) is an American professional football official in the National Football League (NFL) since the 2010 NFL season, who wears uniform number 29.

== Early life ==
Hill was born in Washington, D.C. and raised mostly in upstate New York. He did not play football in high school because he was undersized. He would play the role of referee when his friends played pickup football.

Hill earned degrees in electrical and software engineering and computer science from the University at Buffalo before moving to the Washington metropolitan area to work as a software engineer for Westinghouse Electric Corporation. To make extra money, he responded to a newspaper ad for football officials and spent the next fourteen years officiating high school football games as a side job. He made $13 per game as a youth football referee.

== Officiating career ==
Hill's first college football officiating experience came in 2004 in the Mid-Eastern Athletic Conference. He was an official in Conference USA, where he worked at the referee position. In 2007, Hill worked four games in the now-defunct NFL Europe league as a line judge.

Hill was hired by the NFL in 2010 and made his first appearance during a September 12, 2010, game between the Washington Redskins and Dallas Cowboys at FedExField as a line judge. He was promoted to referee with the start of the 2019 NFL season following the retirements of Pete Morelli and Walt Coleman. He worked as a line judge, side judge, and field judge before being promoted to referee, the seventh African-American to receive this honor.

=== Controversies ===
On January 3, 2021, Hill called a roughing-the-passer penalty against Detroit Lions safety Tracy Walker after he sacked Kirk Cousins of the Minnesota Vikings on a 4th and goal play. The sack, which would have given the Lions the ball, appeared to be routine as the Lions players started to celebrate before realizing the penalty flag was against them. The call was highly criticized.

On October 4, 2026, Hill was inadvertently knocked over after Minnesota Vikings linebacker Eric Wilson was shoved into Hill by Miami Dolphins running back Ollie Gordon II during a play. Wilson attempted to help Hill up and check on him, but Hill got up and immediately yelled at Wilson. The play would ultimately be called dead, though not due to the official being knocked over. Hill has been suspended one game for "unprofessional conduct".

== Engineering career ==
After earning his bachelor's degree from Buffalo, Hill earned a Master of Science from Johns Hopkins University.

In the 1990s, Hill worked as a NASA contractor at Goddard Space Flight Center for what became Raytheon Technologies. In 2000, he was hired as an aerospace software engineer at the Johns Hopkins Applied Physics Laboratory Space Exploration Sector. He was the flight software lead on MESSENGER and had important roles on the New Horizons mission and the Parker Solar Probe. He has served as the flight software lead for the Precision Tracking Space System, has led the development of fault protection systems for the Radiation Belt Storm Probes and has led flight software development for the Hubble Space Telescope. While working for Raytheon, he was a developer for the Submillimeter Wave Astronomy Satellite programs.

In 2006, he was named Engineer of the Year by the Baltimore chapter of the American Institute of Aeronautics and Astronautics.

He was the lead author of Command and Data Handling Flight Software test framework: A Radiation Belt Storm Probes practice, a paper presented at the 2013 IEEE Aerospace Conference.

== Personal life ==
As of June 2020, Hill resided in Bowie, Maryland with his wife, VaLerie. He is the brother of Seattle radio host, Steve "The Thrill" Hill of the KISW 99.9 radio show The Mens Room.
