= KZOK-FM =

Classic rock radio station in Seattle

- Seattle, Washington; United States
- Broadcast area: Seattle metropolitan area
- Frequency: 102.5 MHz (HD Radio)
- Branding: 102.5 KZOK

Programming
- Format: Classic rock
- Subchannels: HD2: TikTok Radio

Ownership
- Owner: iHeartMedia; (iHM Licenses, LLC)
- Sister stations: KBKS-FM, KHHO, KJAQ, KJEB, KJR, KJR-FM, KPTR

History
- First air date: December 1964
- Former call signs: KTW-FM (1964–1974)

Technical information
- Licensing authority: FCC
- Facility ID: 20357
- Class: C
- ERP: 73,000 watts
- HAAT: 698 meters (2,290 ft); 696 meters (2,283 ft) (CP)
- Transmitter coordinates: 47.504556°N 121.969°W; 47.504639°N 121.968833°W (CP)

Links
- Public license information: Public file; LMS
- Webcast: Listen live (via iHeartRadio)
- Website: kzok.iheart.com

KZOK-FM (102.5 MHz) is a commercial radio station located in Seattle, Washington. It airs a classic rock radio format and is owned by iHeartMedia, Inc. KZOK's transmitter is located near Issaquah, Washington, on Tiger Mountain, and operates from studios in Seattle in the Belltown neighborhood northwest of Downtown.

KZOK-FM broadcasts in HD.

== History ==
=== KTW-FM (1964–1974) ===
In December 1964, the station signed on as KTW-FM. It was owned by David Segal, who called his format "The Wonderful Sound of Seattle." At first, it mostly simulcast co-owned KTW (1250 AM, now KKDZ).

The station's formats in its early years included Top 40 for nine months, then a country music format called "The Nashville Sound."

KTW-FM, along with KTW (AM), was acquired by Norwood and Dawn Patterson of Central California. Nordawn, Inc. switched the stations to a "paid religion" format. In 1970, the stations were put into court-ordered receivership, administered by attorney Walter Webster Jr. Norwood J. Patterson was sentenced to two years in federal prison for failure to pay the government employee withholding taxes. He also sabotaged both AM and FM transmitters the afternoon that the stations were placed in receivership by driving to the West Seattle transmitter site and pulling the "finals." He failed to check the engineering locker where spares were located.

=== Progressive rock (1974–1975) ===
In 1974, KTW-FM stopped simulcasting the AM station and changed to progressive rock, while also changing call letters to KZOK-FM. The FM station was sold to the Sterling Recreation Organization with AM 1250 sold off to Don Dudley, owner of KYAC. SRO would then pair KZOK with KUUU (1590 AM), which aired an oldies format.

=== Mainstream rock (1975–1985) ===
In August 1975, KZOK moved from its free-form progressive format to a more mass-appeal and better–researched AOR format. With the success of KZOK's rock format on FM, in 1982, the AM station switched to a different rock format, modern rock, allowing KZOK's advertisers to have two choices for their commercials aimed at Seattle's rock audience. The AM station was renamed KJET.

=== Classic rock (1985–present) ===
In 1985, KZOK tried moving to a more adult soft rock/adult album alternative format, but with a dip in the ratings, the station shifted to classic rock in October of the following year.

Adams Communications bought the stations in 1989. Adams would rename the AM station KZOK (AM), subscribing to the satellite-delivered syndicated "Z Rock Network." In November 1992, Adams Communications filed for bankruptcy, selling KZOK-AM-FM to CLG Media, a subsidiary of the Chrysler Capital Corporation.

In July 1994, CLG Media sold KZOK-FM to EZ Communications, while KZOK-AM was sold to Salem Communications to carry its religious programming as KPOZ. In July 1997, EZ was bought out by American Radio Systems. Westinghouse/CBS bought American Radio Systems' stations (including KZOK) on September 19, 1997. In June 1998, CBS split off the radio division under the revived Infinity Broadcasting name, which would be renamed CBS Radio in December 2005. In 2011, KZOK-FM hired actor and radio personality Danny Bonaduce to host its morning show. Bonaduce had been a child actor, seen in the classic TV sitcom The Partridge Family in the 1970s.

On February 2, 2017, CBS Radio announced it would merge with Entercom (which locally owns KHTP, KISW, KKWF, and KNDD). On October 10, CBS announced that as part of the process of obtaining regulatory approval of the merger, KZOK would be one of sixteen stations that would be divested by Entercom, along with sister stations KJAQ and KFNQ. (KMPS would be retained by Entercom.) On November 1, 2017, iHeartMedia announced that it will acquire KZOK-FM, KJAQ and KFNQ. To meet ownership limits set by the FCC, KFNY (formerly KFOO) and KTDD (formerly KUBE) were divested to the Ocean Stations Trust in order to be sold to a different owner. Until the completion of the divestment of KFNY and KTDD to the trust, CBS placed KZOK, KJAQ and KFNQ into the Entercom Divestiture Trust.

The merger of CBS and Entercom was approved on November 9, and was consummated on November 17. The sale of KZOK to iHeart was completed on December 19, 2017.

In January 2024, Danny Bonaduce retired from radio and was replaced by BJ Shea, who previously hosted mornings at rival KISW. Sarah Schiller remained as co-host. Just nine months later, Shea abruptly left KZOK with no explanation. In October 2025, Sarah was dismissed amid massive layoffs by iHeartMedia. The morning show was the last airshift with a local host, as all other DJs are voicetracked from out of market.

In 2026, KZOK changed its positioning from "Seattle’s Classic Rock Station" to "Seattle’s Rock". This came as the station, along with many iHeartMedia-owned classic rock stations began adding more 90s and 2000s rock into their playlist, effectively shifting to mainstream rock-like format.

== Notable personalities ==
- Danny Bonaduce
- Jimmy Kimmel – now the host of Jimmy Kimmel Live! on ABC-TV
- Bob Rivers
- BJ Shea
- Steve Slaton
