= KMPS =

KMPS may refer to:

- KMPS (AM), a radio station (910 AM) licensed to Hesperia, California, United States
- KSWD (FM), a radio station (94.1 FM) licensed to Seattle, Washington, United States, which used the call sign KMPS-FM from 1978 to 2017
- KPTR (AM), a radio station (1090 AM) licensed to Seattle, Washington, United States, which used the call sign KMPS from July to December 1999
- KKOL (AM), a radio station (1300 AM) licensed to Seattle, Washington, United States, which used the call sign KMPS from 1975 to 1997
- Potassium peroxymonosulfate
