= Tom Hutyler =

American broadcaster

Tom Hutyler (/ˈhʌtlər/; born 1956 or 1957) is the public address (PA) announcer for the Seattle Mariners. He is also a Seattle radio personality, sports reporter, and news anchor. He worked for KOMO AM for many years until 2023. He then worked for KNWN AM.

Hutyler began his radio career in 1976 at KJRB in Spokane, Washington, his hometown. A year later, he move to KJR (AM) in Seattle. He also was the color commentator for Washington State Cougars football in 1984. Later, Hutyler was the music director and an on-air personality at top 40 station KUBE. He has worked for other Seattle stations, including KVI and KLSY.

As the Mariners PA announcer, Hutyler is known for his call of Hall of Famer Ken Griffey Jr. He began working full-time for the Mariners at the Kingdome in 1987, then continued as the team moved to Safeco Field. A Spokane reporter called him the "Voice of God". Hutyler was the stadium announcer for the canceled GameCube video game Nintendo Pennant Chase Baseball.

Hutyler has written several comedic songs. At KUBE, he wrote and helped produced a video tribute to the city of Seattle. in 1987, he wrote a parody of La Bamba about Seattle Seahawks player Brian Bosworth that Bosworth disliked. In 2018, Hutyler wrote and sang a song honoring Washington State quarterback Gardner Minshew, titled "The Mississippi Mustache."
