= Steve Slaton (DJ) =

American disc jockey and music director

Steve Slaton (born January 16, 1953) is an American rock and roll disc jockey and music director. He is best known as an on-air personality for Seattle radio station 102.5 KZOK-FM and, formerly, 99.9 KISW-FM. He began his career in 1971 at the Tacoma station KLAY-FM. In 1973, Slaton moved to KISW-FM in Seattle, where he would spend the next nineteen years. In 1992, Slaton was hired by KZOK-FM, where he hosted the midday and afternoon shows for the following seventeen years.

== Early life ==
Slaton was born and raised in Tacoma, Washington. He attended Lincoln High, and in 1969, at age 16, began studying radio broadcasting at a local vocational school in Tacoma. In 1972, he began hosting the evening show at the Tacoma-based KLAY-FM (now known as KBKS-FM or KISS 106.1).

== KISW-FM (1973 - 1992) ==
Slaton began his time in Seattle radio in 1973 hosting the late night show at 99.9 KISW FM. After five years, he moved to early evenings, where he would stay for the next eight years. His most frequently played artists consisted of AC/DC, Metallica, Van Halen, Def Leppard, Scorpions, Tom Petty, Heart, Led Zeppelin, and others. Slaton became an early fan of the band AC/DC and began devoting an hour or more of airtime to the band each night, including one instance where he played the AC/DC song 'Bad Boy Boogie' for one hour straight. His signature introduction of the band was, "I can't give you their name, but their initials are AC/DC."

Stump Slaton, Metal Shop, and Livetime became regular features on Slaton's show. In the early 1990s, Time magazine quoted Slaton on the emerging Seattle grunge scene, describing him as the "regent of the local deejays."

In September 1992, Slaton was fired from KISW due to creative differences following the purchase of KISW-FM by Nationwide Insurance. In response to his departure, Slaton stated "For a boy from the wrong side of the tracks in Tacoma to be at a great station like KISW for such a long time was a great privilege. So I can't feel too bad about it."

== KZOK-FM (1992 - 2008) ==
In October 1992, Slaton moved to 102.5 KZOK-FM where he hosted afternoons, along with the Sunday morning program "Breakfast with the Beatles" from 1999 until his departure in December 2008. In 2002, Slaton interviewed Sir Paul McCartney during the Driving World Tour.

== KPLU-FM and KJR-FM and Return to KZOK-FM (2010 - 2019) ==
In October 2010, Slaton began working as a host at the jazz and blues station KPLU-FM.

In June 2011, Slaton was hired by 95.7 KJR-FM to host afternoons.

In May 2016, Slaton was back on the air on 102.5 KZOK-FM until his departure in August 2019. At the time of his departure, KZOK was the #1 station in Seattle.
