= KJR-FM =

Sports radio station in Seattle

- Seattle, Washington; United States
- Broadcast area: Seattle/Tacoma/Puget Sound
- Frequency: 93.3 MHz (HD Radio)
- Branding: Sports Radio 93.3 KJR

Programming
- Format: Sports
- Subchannels: HD2: Urban contemporary "KUBE 93.3 HD2"
- Affiliations: Fox Sports Radio; Westwood One; Seattle Kraken; Seattle Sounders FC; Washington Huskies

Ownership
- Owner: iHeartMedia; (iHM Licenses, LLC)
- Sister stations: KBKS-FM, KHHO, KJAQ, KJEB, KJR, KPTR, KZOK-FM

History
- First air date: May 6, 1964
- Former call signs: KBLE-FM (1964–1982); KUBE (1982–2016); KPWK (2016–2018); KUBE (2018–2022)

Technical information
- Licensing authority: FCC
- Facility ID: 48387
- Class: C0
- ERP: 100,000 watts
- HAAT: 387 meters (1,270 ft)
- Transmitter coordinates: 47.544278°N 122.108444°W

Links
- Public license information: Public file; LMS
- Webcast: Listen live (via iHeartRadio); Listen live (via iHeartRadio) (HD2)
- Website: 933kjr.iheart.com HD2: kube933.iheart.com

KJR-FM (93.3 MHz) is a commercial radio station licensed to Seattle, Washington. The station is owned and operated by iHeartMedia. The studios and offices are on Elliott Avenue West in Seattle's Belltown neighborhood northwest of downtown. The transmitter is located on Cougar Mountain.

== History ==
=== Early years (1964–1981) ===
The station signed on the air on May 6, 1964, as KBLE-FM. It was owned by Eastside Broadcasting, as the sister station to KNBX (AM 1050). While KNBX aired country music, KBLE-FM aired a Christian radio format, with an effective radiated power of 6,600 watts.

Within a few years, the formats were flipped. KBLE-FM began playing country music while the AM station changed its callsign to KBLE and served as a Christian radio station. KBLE-FM's power was increased to 20,000 watts and its transmitter was moved to Cougar Mountain in Issaquah.

In the 1970s, the stations were acquired by Ostrander-Wilson, which returned the religious format to KBLE-FM. It also increased its power to 100,000 watts, making it audible around the Puget Sound region from Olympia to Mount Vernon.

=== Top 40/CHR (1981–1991) ===
On March 17, 1981, after First Media bought the station, KBLE-FM flipped to an automated Top 40/CHR format as "The Northwest's New 93 FM". Its first song was "Use ta Be My Girl" by The O'Jays, followed by "Beast of Burden" by the Rolling Stones.

On July 8, 1981, at 5:04 p.m., KBLE-FM officially launched with a live and local on-air staff. On April 2, 1982, the call letters were changed to KUBE, and the station became known as "KUBE 93 FM". Shortly after the switch to Top 40/CHR, KUBE shot up to the top 5 in the Seattle radio market ratings (occasionally reaching #1 in some books and target demographics) and would later become the dominant CHR station in the market. In 1988, Cook Inlet Radio Partners acquired the station.

KUBE primarily competed against two other Top 40/CHR stations in the Seattle-Tacoma market: KNBQ (owned by Viacom), and KPLZ (owned by Golden West Broadcasting), creating an intense rivalry between the three stations throughout the rest of the 1980s (with the exception of KNBQ, who flipped to oldies in 1988). KUBE jocks during this period include Bobby Case, Diane McKenzie, Tom Hutyler, "Gilly" Johnson, Barry Beck, Michele Grosenick, "Shotgun Tom" Kelly, Glenn Beck, Wendy Christopher, Mark Edwards, Jerry Hart, Trey Hernandez, Gary Bryan, Hollywood Humphries, Truck Rogers, and Brad Spencer. KUBE was also the Seattle affiliate for "American Top 40", first hosted by Casey Kasem, and then Shadoe Stevens. From July 1981 until September 1995, the KUBE morning show was hosted by Charlie Brown (formerly of KJR), Ty Flint (formerly of KVI), and Mary White.

=== Rhythmic (1991–2016) ===
In November 1991, KUBE gradually shifted to a rhythmic contemporary direction as "KUBE 93 Jams" (but still retained its normal movement on mainstream titles) and maintained strong ratings during this period.

In March 1994, Cook Inlet sold KUBE to a partnership between New Century Management and the Ackerley Group called New Century Media. (KJR and soft adult contemporary station KLTX joined the group in July.) Also that month, likely because of the public outcry of a "gangland-style" drive by shooting of a Ballard High School student (which some claimed was motivated by hip hop music and a growing gangster culture in Seattle), as well as its audience's changing music tastes, KUBE shifted to a hybrid rhythmic/modern rock format as simply "KUBE 93". The station began using the slogans "Seattle's New Music Revolution" and "Channel X", a popular way to identify modern rock stations at the time. However, the station's ratings were not impressive with the format, and by November of that year, the station shifted back to a full-blown Rhythmic format. The station quickly regained its top 10 status, usually peaking at #1 in several books for the next several years.

In February 1998, the Ackerley Group bought the station outright from New Century.

For many years, KUBE marketed itself as "Seattle's #1 Hit Music Station, KUBE 93". iHeartMedia (then known as Clear Channel Communications) purchased KUBE, along with sister stations KJR, KJR-FM, KFNK and outdoor advertiser AK Media, from Ackerley Communications in 2001. On April 1, 2009, Clear Channel acquired Top 40 rival KBKS-FM from CBS Radio. At the time, KUBE was competing against rhythmic AC station KQMV (Movin' 92.5), owned by Sandusky. KUBE changed its slogan to "More Non-Stop Music", and then later to "Hits & Hip-Hop".

KUBE was the home of The T-Man Show morning show, which aired from September 1995 to September 2009, when "The T-Man" retired to become a professional poker player. The show featured Robert "The T-Man" Tepper (who marketed himself using only his voice), as well as co-hosts Pasty Dave (who was the show's producer), Hot Shot Scott, Jimmy Shapiro, Stephen Kilbreath, Vinnie The Pooh and Tari Free. The show was also briefly syndicated through Premiere Radio Networks, and was heard on KKRZ in Portland, KYLD in San Francisco and several other cities.

Shellie Hart, longtime midday DJ and music director for the station, was let go in November 2011 because of budget cuts issued by Clear Channel. Hart had been with the station since 1991, except for a brief 3-year period between 1996 and 1999, when Hart programmed modern rock station KEDJ Phoenix. Hart is currently at KRWM.

Despite many years of high ratings, around 2011, however, KUBE's ratings began declining. KUBE was also no exception to company-wide budget cuts at Clear Channel, with several long-time personalities replaced with voicetracked talent from outside of the market. New competition from KQMV and KHTP took away some of KUBE's listeners.

KUBE also rotated through a few morning shows after The T-Man Show ended, such as Eddie Francis & Karen Wild, The JV Show (syndicated from sister KYLD), The Breakfast Club, and DJ SupaSam. None of these programming changes resulted in any ratings improvement for the station. In the December 2015 Nielsen ratings period for the Seattle market, KUBE was ranked #13 with a 2.3 share.

=== Back to Top 40 (2016–2018) ===
As part of a major format shuffle involving four of iHeart's Seattle radio stations, on January 19, 2016, at noon, after playing "Whatever You Like" by T.I. and a commercial break, KUBE's long-time rhythmic CHR format and branding moved to lower-power sister station KKBW (104.9 FM), displacing that station's active rock format. At the same time, 93.3 adopted KBKS's mainstream CHR format, added some newer rhythmic titles to the playlist, and rebranded as "Power 93.3". The first song on "Power" was "Sorry" by Justin Bieber. This returned the 93.3 frequency in Seattle to a Top 40/Mainstream format for the first time in nearly 24 years. The station also brought in a new live and local air staff which included Carla Marie & Anthony for mornings, Kat Fisher for middays, Kwame Dankwa on the afternoon drive, and Brady for evenings.

The station took on the KPWK call letters on January 26, 2016; the KUBE call letters moved to KKBW the same day. Ratings did not improve much, with the station usually ranked in the mid-2 to mid-3 share of the market. Meanwhile, KQMV saw a big ratings boost at the time, sometimes finishing in first place. In the April 2018 ratings, KPWK was ranked #18 with a 2.8 share, well behind KQMV, which had a 6.8 share.

=== Back to rhythmic (2018–2022) ===
On May 3, 2018, at 3 p.m., after playing "Wait" by Maroon 5, KPWK flipped back to rhythmic CHR, returning to the "KUBE" branding as "KUBE 93.3". The first song on the revived KUBE was "Nice for What" by Drake. Concurrent with the move, KBKS also returned to its previous mainstream Top 40 format, effectively reversing the ill-fated 2016 format changes. The KUBE callsign returned on May 11, 2018. Positioned as "Seattle's #1 for Hip Hop & Throwbacks", the playlist was focused on current hip hop hits as well as some gold/re-current hip hop titles from the 1990s and 2000s.

=== Sports (2022–present) ===
At midnight on February 19, 2022, KUBE dropped the rhythmic CHR format again, and began stunting with a Top 40/CHR playlist interspersed with promos for sister station KBKS. Despite announcements teasing that this "preview" would end on March 10, KUBE flipped to a simulcast of sports talk-formatted KJR on March 8. The early launch was done in order to take advantage of the trade of Seattle Seahawks quarterback Russell Wilson to the Denver Broncos earlier that day.

The move of KJR's programming to FM was part of a multi-station switch; on April 11, KJR shifted to all-syndicated programming from Fox Sports Radio and CBS Sports Radio, while KFNQ changed call letters to KPTR and flipped to all-conservative talk programming as "The Patriot". The KJR-FM callsign moved to 93.3 FM on April 20; the former KJR-FM subsequently changed callsigns to KJEB, while the KUBE call letters were moved to the former KDZA in Pueblo, Colorado on May 12.

== HD Radio ==
KJR-FM broadcasts in the HD Radio format.

When KUBE signed on HD operations in 2006, KUBE's HD2 sub-channel carried a hip hop format branded as "KUBE 2". In 2009, it was replaced with a broad-based rhythmic format known as "WiLD". The "WiLD" format was patterned after most Clear Channel owned rhythmic top 40 stations by playing mainstream rhythmic pop/dance tracks and very few hip hop/R&B tracks. This would later be replaced with a children's radio format branded as "Kids Club Radio". From December 11, 2017, through May 3, 2018, KPWK-HD2 carried the rhythmic CHR format as "KUBE 93 HD2", after the 104.9 frequency was divested. After KUBE was revived on the analog/HD1, KUBE-HD2 flipped to a classic hip hop format. On June 26, 2019, KUBE-HD2 changed to iHeart's "Pride Radio" network, which airs Top 40/dance music targeting the LGBTQ community. This marked the second such format in Seattle, the other being Entercom's "Channel Q" format airing on KNDD-HD2/K277AE. It has since been moved to the HD2 sub-channel of KBKS. On February 19, 2022, KUBE's hip hop format and branding returned to the HD2 channel.

== See also ==
- List of three-letter broadcast call signs in the United States
