= KKDZ =

- Kent, Washington; United States
- Broadcast area: Seattle metropolitan area
- Frequency: 1250 kHz
- Branding: Radio Punjabi

Programming
- Language: Punjabi language
- Format: South Asian music and talk

Ownership
- Owner: New Media Broadcasting; (Akal Media KKDZ, Inc.)
- Sister stations: KZIZ

History
- First air date: May 14, 1922; 104 years ago
- Former call signs: KTW (1922–1975); KYAC (1975–1981); KKFX (1981–1993)
- Former frequencies: 833 kHz (1922–1925); 660 kHz (1925–1927); 760 kHz (1927–1928); 1270 kHz (1928–1931); 1220 kHz (1931–1941)
- Call sign meaning: "Kids"

Technical information
- Licensing authority: FCC
- Facility ID: 12112
- Class: B
- Power: 5,000 watts
- Transmitter coordinates: 47°33′49″N 122°21′39″W (day); 47°18′01″N 122°11′19″W (night)

Links
- Public license information: Public file; LMS
- Website: radiopunjab.com

KKDZ (1250 AM) is a radio station licensed to Kent, Washington, owned by New Media Broadcasting. It was first licensed in April 1922 as KTW in Seattle, and is one of the oldest stations in the United States. It is known as "Radio Punjabi", airing a radio format of music and talk in Punjabi and other South Asian languages. Most programming is simulcast on KZIZ (1560 AM) in Pacific, serving the Tacoma area and KNTS (1680 AM) in Seattle.

By day, KKDZ broadcasts at 5,000 watts non-directional. At night, to protect other stations on 1250 AM from interference, it switches to a directional antenna with a four-tower array.

== History ==
=== KTW ===
The station received its first license, with the randomly issued call sign of KTW, on April 22, 1922. The original licensee was the First Presbyterian Church of Seattle, located at the intersection of 7th Avenue and Spring Street. Construction was credited to "J. D. Ross, superintendent of the City Light Department, and James G. Priestly of the city chemist's department". Originally a 250-watt station, its debut broadcasts were made on May 14, 1922 from 11:00 a.m. to 12:30 p.m. and 7:30 to 9:30 p.m. One of the station's purposes was to provide religious services to twenty-two outlying Presbyterian mission houses and chapels that didn't have their own ministers.

KTW was originally licensed to use the single shared "entertainment" wavelength of 360 meters (833 kHz), and was one of the last stations to remain on that wavelength. In 1925, it switched to 660 kHz, followed in 1927, by a move to 760 kHz. On November 11, 1928, under the provisions of a major reallocation resulting from the Federal Radio Commission's (FRC) General Order 40, KTW was reassigned to 1270 kHz, shared with KFOA (now KKOL). In 1931, it moved to 1220 kHz, sharing this frequency with KWSC (now KWSU) in Pullman, Washington. On March 29, 1941, along with all the other stations on 1220 kHz, KTW moved to 1250 kHz, the frequency KTW and its successors have occupied ever since, as part of the implementation of the North American Regional Broadcasting Agreement.

Commercial programming started in 1946. KTW was sold to David M Segal in 1964. A Top 40 format failed because KTW shared 1250 kHz with KWSU, Pullman, which had priority. KTW signed off at sunset, then signed on again at 11:15pm when KWSU, at Washington State University, signed off. The arrangement killed young listenership. The station’s 4 DJs worked out of the First Presbyterian Church cinderblock building studios at 710 Madison Street. Segal also established KTW-FM at 102.5 in 1964. FM listenership was meager in that era, when few radios were equipped to receive FM signals. KTW-FM was a popular "underground station" in the late 60s, simulcasting KOL (AM) 6 a.m. to 6 p.m., then "going underground" by playing progressive rock for the next 12 hours.

KTW-AM-FM were eventually sold to Nordawn, Incorporated, short for Norwood and Dawn Patterson, for $25,000. The Pattersons flipped the AM and FM stations to paid Christian radio programming, featuring shows including "The Lutheran Hour", "Curtis Springer", and others. Patterson also owned Christian stations in Central California. Patterson was found guilty of tax fraud in 1971 for failing to pay the Treasury Department employee withholding taxes which he had withheld from workers' paychecks. The court ruled he had been keeping the money for himself. The Pattersons' Seattle stations went into court-ordered receivership in 1970. An attorney. Walter M. Webster Jr., posted notices in the studios, by then located on the 15th floor in the Northern Life Tower building at 3rd and University. Patterson immediately ordered the control room board op to shut down both transmitters. Patterson then drove to West Seattle to remove the frequency control crystals from both transmitters. He failed to notice spares in the engineering cabinet. The station was back up and running that night. Norwood J. Patterson was sentenced to two years in federal prison.

In 1971, KTW-AM-FM were sold to Sterling Recreation Organization (SRO), a chain of cinemas in the Seattle area owned by Fred Danz. Paid religion had limited audience appeal. Under Danz, the format switched to news/talk. The stations found an audience using news blocks and intelligent hosts including Aaron Brown, Linda Gist, Greg Palmer (later at KING-TV) and Wayne Cody (later at KIRO-TV). The News Director was Phil Cogan.

The AM station was hampered by the limited nighttime hours. KTW was a shared time station, required to go off the air at night when KWSU 1250 AM in Pullman, Washington, was operating. Plans were made to request FCC approval to move KTW programming to 1590 AM, which had no limit on broadcast hours, but SRO suddenly decided to end the KTW news/talk format. SRO proceeded in 1975 to purchase KUUU 1590 and operated that station with a music format under those call letters until 1977, when it became KZOK-AM. (When SRO purchased KTW AM-FM, the FM station at 102.5 had become KZOK-FM).

=== KYAC and KKFX ===
Financial problems resulted in 1250 AM being sold to Don Dudley and a format flip to urban adult contemporary, along with a call letter change to KYAC in 1975. KYAC moved its format over from 1460. For a time, KYAC aired classical music format.

In 1981, the station was sold to Northstar Broadcasters and renamed KKFX ("K-Fox"). Vice President and General Manager John L. Hawkins implemented "Greatest Hits" oldies music during the day to serve a general audience, a format he had success with at San Francisco station KNEW and others. The station was known for a howl sound effect dropped between songs.

Because the nighttime radio audience has a different listener profile, K-Fox aired "Night Beat -- The Beat of the Fox" (emphasizing R&B and Rhythmic contemporary), during the evening hours. Night Beat proved so popular that the station evolved to playing it full-time in 1982, using the slogan "K-Fox – Seattle's Hottest Music". Bingham Broadcasting bought the station four years later. In 1987, the station dropped its rhythmic format in favor of satellite-fed urban oldies, though it would return to rhythmic a year later. This format continued with minor variations until KKFX signed off in March 1993.

=== KidStar Network ===
On April 7, 1993, the call sign were changed to KKDZ. A month later, on May 14, the station returned to the air as the flagship outlet for the fledgling "KidStar" radio network, run by the Seattle-based Children's Media Network, and the station began broadcast in AM stereo. Financial problems forced the network to cease national distribution on February 14, 1997. Despite a planned shutdown for February 22, KKDZ remaining on the air.

=== Radio Disney ===
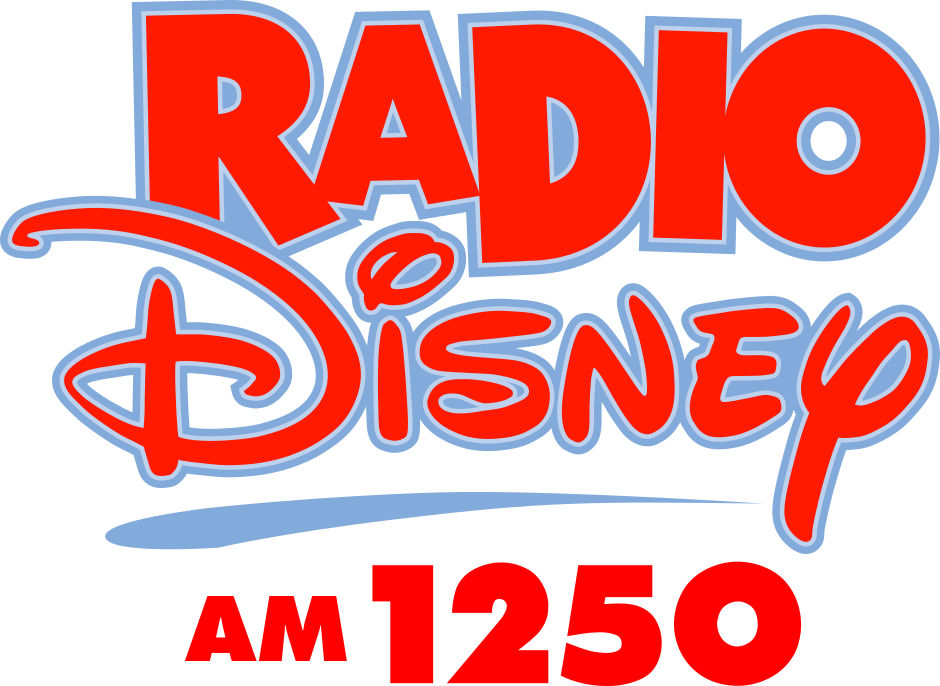
KKDZ logo under Radio Disney affiliation

On March 8, 1997, KKDZ dropped KidStar and flipped to the similarly formatted Radio Disney, who would later buy the station outright in January 1998.

The cessation of operations of KARR in February 2014 due to the expiration of the lease on their transmitter site also affected KKDZ, as it used the KARR site for night time operations. KKDZ filed with the Federal Communications Commission for a Special Temporary Authority (STA) grant to run with a lower power of 1.25 kilowatts at night from their daytime transmitter site.

=== Desi 1250 ===
On August 13, 2014, Disney put KKDZ and 22 other Radio Disney stations up for sale, in order to focus more on digital distribution of the network. In May 2015, a deal to sell the station to Universal Media Access (owners of KLOK in San Francisco) for $500,000 was announced.

On September 17, 2015, the sale of KKDZ was consummated, at which point it officially dropped its Radio Disney affiliation and switched to a South Asian format featuring Hindi, Punjabi and English language programming. It was branded "Desi 1250". That ended 22 years of pre-teen and young teen oriented programming on the station, dating back to the KidStar days.

=== Radio Punjabi ===
On October 16, 2017, Sukhdev Singh Dhillon's New Media Broadcasting, through licensee Akal Broadcasting Corporation, purchased KKDZ from Universal Media Access. The price tag was $500,000. The station's license was transferred to sister corporation Akal Media KKDZ, Inc. effective August 27, 2019 as part of a corporate restructuring.

The station became part of the Radio Punjabi chain, continuing to air South Asian programming, focusing on talk, news and Bollywood music.

In October 2024, the Community of license was changed to Kent, as part of transmitter site relocation.

== See also ==
- List of initial AM-band station grants in the United States
