= The BJ Shea Morning Experience =

American radio program

BJ & Migs Mornings
- Other names: The BJ Shea Experience (1999-2023)
- Genre: Comedy talk radio
- Running time: 4 hours (6am-10am)
- Country of origin: United States
- Language: English
- Home station: KISW 99.9 FM
- Starring: BJ Shea; Steve Migs; The Reverend EnFuego; Vicky Barcelona; Danny Vigil; Ooh Sara; Joey Deez
- Produced by: Steve Migs
- Recording studio: Seattle, Washington
- Original release: October 23, 1999 – December 15, 2023
- Opening theme: Collective Soul - Heavy
- Website: BJ&Migs
- Podcast: Daily Podcast

BJ & MIGs Mornings was a morning drive time radio show on 99.9 FM KISW in Seattle, Washington, owned by Audacy (previously Entercom). The show aired Monday through Friday, 6–10 a.m. PST and was also available as a stream and a downloadable podcast from the station's official website as well as a stream and podcast on Entercom's Radio.com website and mobile app.

== KQBZ era (1999–2005) ==
The BJ Shea Experience started in 1999 as a two-hour show on KQBZ "The Buzz" (100.7 FM), middays between syndicated shows by Kennedy and Tom Leykis. The primary theme of the show is relationships, primarily from a male point of view, though it has tackled some highly controversial topics of sex, politics and religion.

In 2000, Shea was dismissed from the station due to controversial comments made on air. Shea successfully appealed the decision in an arbitration hearing, overturning the dismissal.

In 2004, in the wake of the Super Bowl XXXVIII halftime show controversy, Shea used his show as a platform to speak out against the attempts to increase censorship on broadcasting. "I think this is totally from the White House," said Shea. "I think that George Bush is trying to pander to the extreme Christian Coalition he thinks will back him in this election. I hope it's a huge failure and he gets kicked out of the White House."

In May 2005, Entercom Seattle LLC, parent company of KQBZ, was sued by morning show host Robin Erickson of the Robin & Maynard Morning Show, on charges of gender discrimination and creating a hostile work environment, based upon remarks made during BJ Shea's show. Shea, however, was not named as a defendant in the lawsuit.

KQBZ's promotional slogan at the time was "Radio for Guys," and the suit contended that it was part of the problem. "The Shea program regularly features verbal attacks on women," the suit claimed. "These attacks repeatedly and crudely attack women in general and specifically in the workplace, claiming, among other assertions, that women are bad employees whose presence in the workplace is bad for men." The suit also claimed that Shea attacked Erickson on air on the basis of her gender and age, promoting The Howard Stern Show even though it ran during Robin & Maynard's time slot on KISW (a station also owned by Entercom), and criticized other female Entercom employees on the air. Shea was disciplined for his on-air comments, though the suit contended that the punishment was not severe enough.

== KISW era (2005–2023) ==
On November 30, 2005, KQBZ changed its format from FM Talk to Country music. BJ Shea's show, newly rechristened as "The BJ Shea Morning Experience," would move to KISW on January 3 to fill the timeslot vacated by The Howard Stern Show's move to satellite radio. No details were given as to the status of the Robin & Maynard show, or the ongoing litigation, except that the show would not be picked up by KISW.

The show became one of the few shows across the United States to succeed in maintaining and growing its listenership after the departure of Howard Stern. In the ratings book that immediately succeeded the move, KISW and Shea's show both placed at or near the top in their target-demographic audience, primarily men 18 to 49

The show's final episode aired Friday, December 15, 2023, after it was announced that BJ Shea would no longer be working at KISW. Three days later, Shea announced he was moving to rival KZOK, replacing Danny Bonaduce, who was retiring from radio. Co-host Steve Migs would go on to start "The Daly Migs Show" with Taryn Daly as his co-host on January 3, 2024.
