= KBKS-FM =

Contemporary hit radio station in Tacoma, Washington

- Tacoma, Washington; United States
- Broadcast area: Seattle metropolitan area
- Frequency: 106.1 MHz (HD Radio)
- Branding: Hits 106.1

Programming
- Format: Contemporary hit radio
- Subchannels: HD2: Pride Radio
- Affiliations: NBC News Radio (health updates only); Premiere Networks

Ownership
- Owner: iHeartMedia; (iHM Licenses, LLC)
- Sister stations: KHHO; KJAQ; KJEB; KJR; KJR-FM; KPTR; KZOK-FM

History
- First air date: May 1959
- Former call signs: KLAY-FM (1959–1980); KRPM-FM (1980–1981); KRPM (1981–1986); KRPM-FM (1986–1995); KCIN-FM (1995–1996); KRPM-FM (1996); KBKS (1996–2004)
- Former frequencies: 106.3 MHz (1959–1961)
- Call sign meaning: "Kiss" (former branding)

Technical information
- Licensing authority: FCC
- Facility ID: 27020
- Class: C
- ERP: 73,000 watts
- HAAT: 698 meters (2,290 feet)
- Transmitter coordinates: 47°30′16.7″N 121°58′7.8″W

Links
- Public license information: Public file; LMS
- Webcast: Listen live (via iHeartRadio); HD2: Listen live (via iHeartRadio)
- Website: hits1061seattle.iheart.com

KBKS-FM (106.1 MHz) – branded as Hits 106.1 – is a commercial radio station licensed to Tacoma, Washington, and serving the Seattle metropolitan area. Owned by iHeartMedia, it broadcasts a top 40 (CHR) format. The studios and offices are located on Elliott Avenue West in the Belltown neighborhood of Seattle. The transmitter is on Tiger Mountain, in Issaquah.

KBKS is the flagship station of the syndicated morning show The Jubal Show.

== History ==
=== Beautiful music (1959–1972) ===
The station signed on the air in May 1959 as KLAY-FM. It was originally on 106.3 MHz, with an effective radiated power of 830 watts. KLAY-FM was owned by Clay Huntington and aired a beautiful music format, playing 15-minute music sweeps of mostly instrumental cover versions of pop songs, Broadway and Hollywood showtunes. KLAY-FM was the first FM station in the Pacific Northwest broadcasting in stereo.

In 1961, the station moved to 106.1 MHz, its current frequency, and increased power to 25,000 watts. With a tower 700 feet (210 m) tall, the station was still limited to the area around Tacoma and not the larger Seattle radio market. (The transmitter would be moved to Tiger Mountain in 1980.)

=== Progressive rock (1972–1980) ===
On May 1, 1972, KLAY-FM began airing a progressive rock format during the evening and overnight hours, with the beautiful music format remaining in other dayparts. By October 1972, the rock format was airing full-time. Several famous Seattle radio personalities got their start here during this time period.

=== Country (1980–1996) ===
In March 1980, the station was sold to Ray Court. The station then flipped to country music as "K106", and the call sign changed to KRPM-FM. The station competed against EZ Communications-owned KMPS-FM. In 1984, Olympic Highsmith Broadcasting bought the station, with Heritage Media buying it four years later. The station was simulcast on KRPM/KULL (770 AM) from 1986 to 1991, and again for a brief time beginning in January 1995. On November 1, 1995, the station switched its call sign to KCIN-FM when the station rebranded to "Kickin' Country K106". The AM simulcast moved to 1090 AM as part of a format swap with 770, with 1090 taking the KRPM calls. During this time, Lia Knight began her evening show, then known as Cryin', Lovin' or Leavin' , on KRPM, lasting until the station's format change and her departure for Yakima; in 1998, the program became nationally syndicated as The Lia Show, running until 2022.

In the Spring of 1996, shortly after the passage of the Telecommunications Act of 1996, Heritage swapped KCIN and KRPM to EZ Communications in exchange for EZ's New Orleans cluster. The transaction made KMPS and KCIN sister stations. EZ immediately took over the stations via a local marketing agreement (LMA) until the purchase was completed later that year. EZ also bought rival KYCW-FM from Infinity Broadcasting two weeks prior, which then lead to the end of the country format on KCIN and KRPM.

On March 18, 1996, KCIN and KRPM dropped regular programming and began simulcasting KMPS for four days, then began simulcasting KYCW for two days. At midnight on March 24, KCIN and KRPM began a 39-hour stunt with random audio soundbites, while announcing a change to come the following afternoon.

=== Rhythmic AC (1996–1997) ===
On March 25, 1996, at 3 pm, KCIN and KRPM flipped to a gold-leaning rhythmic adult contemporary format, branded as "Kiss 106". KCIN reacquired the KRPM-FM call sign on April 5, but would adopt the KBKS call letters on April 15, with the -FM suffix being added on January 12, 2004. (KRPM AM continued to simulcast until February 1, 1999, when it flipped to classic country.)

KBKS's playlist consisted of a wide range of rhythmic hits targeting adults 25–54 years old, including Motown, gold hits from the 1960s through the 1980s, re-currents, and current-day hits from artists like Celine Dion, Toni Braxton, Mariah Carey, Janet Jackson, and Boyz II Men. The station primarily competed against KUBE, KLSY, and KPLZ-FM.

=== Top 40 (1997–2016) ===
On May 23, 1997, the Friday before Memorial Day weekend, KBKS flipped to Top 40/CHR and modified its moniker to "Kiss 106.1". This marked the first Mainstream Top 40/CHR in the market since KPLZ shifted to hot AC three years prior. The rhythmic AC format later returned to Seattle radio on KQMV from 2006 to 2010, and KMTT in 2013.

EZ and American Radio Systems merged in July 1997. Westinghouse/CBS bought American Radio Systems' stations (including KBKS) on September 19, 1997. In June 1998, CBS split off the radio division under the revived Infinity Broadcasting name, which would be renamed CBS Radio in December 2005.

At first, KBKS' direction leaned more towards modern adult contemporary as a way to counter KUBE's Rhythmic Top 40 direction. KBKS became more mainstream in early 2000. In 2007, at the same time the station rebranded to "106.1 KISS FM", the station began leaning more rhythmic, in the hopes of denting KUBE's dominant ratings in the Seattle Top 40 battle.

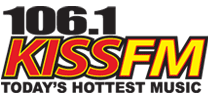
Former KBKS logo (2007–2011); also with "Seattle's#1 Hit Music Station" as slogan (2011–2012)

==== Sale to Clear Channel ====
On December 10, 2008, CBS Radio announced it would swap five stations, including KBKS, to Clear Channel Communications while trading two stations in Houston, Texas. The deal was approved by the FCC on March 31, 2009, and consummated on April 1. Under Clear Channel, now iHeartMedia, the station backed off of its rhythmic lean and returned to a more mainstream direction.

The acquisition by Clear Channel joined KBKS with former long-time rival rhythmic top 40 station KUBE, as KBKS began competing against KQMV and KLCK-FM, as well as KPLZ-FM.

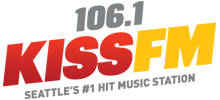
KBKS logo, 2011-2018 (also with purple and gray lettering from 2018-2020)

=== Hot AC (2016–2018) ===
As part of a major format shuffle involving four of iHeartMedia's Seattle stations, on January 19, 2016, at noon, KBKS's top 40 format moved to 93.3 FM (as KPWK, "Power 93.3"), displacing KUBE's rhythmic top 40 format (which moved to co-owned KKBW). At the same time, KBKS shifted to hot AC, adopting the format from KYNW, which flipped to alternative (then, after a sale to Bustos Media in 2019, Regional Mexican). Bender & Molly remained in mornings, with midday host Karen Wild and afternoon host Eric Tyler being let go as part of the change.

=== Top 40 (2018–present) ===
On May 3, 2018, at 3:00 pm, concurrent with the revival of the rhythmic format and KUBE branding on 93.3, KBKS reverted to its previous mainstream Top 40/CHR format. Despite this, ratings remained rather low; the station registered a 2.2 share in the October 2018 Nielsen Audio ratings, down from a 3.2 in September, and trailing KQMV's 6.8 share by a significant margin.

On October 24, 2018, KBKS dropped all of its on-air personalities, and began to run promos hinting at the end of the Kiss format. The next day, the station began a stunt in which songs were periodically interrupted by a demonic voice saying "Kiss is dead", along with airing songs with various sound effects added. On October 29, the station also began promoting an impending announcement on October 31 at 4:00 pm. At that time, the station ran an announcement by iHeartMedia's regional president Robert Dove, saying the company was in the process of revamping KBKS to create a station "that is real, connected to the community, positive, and proud to live in Seattle". KBKS retained its existing format and Kiss FM branding. The station also announced that it would hold a contest to find new co-hosts for its morning show, explaining the prior stunt by stating that Kiss was "dead serious" about finding "Seattle's Funniest Person". The station solicited nominations for this title from listeners, with a chance to win $10,000 if someone is hired based on their suggestion. This came as longtime host Bender Cunningham was let go after nearly 18 years.

On November 12, 2018, The Carla Marie & Anthony Show (which originated with KPWK's CHR format) premiered as KBKS's new morning show. The attempts at retooling did little to improve KBKS's ratings, only increasing by a single tenth of a share by February 2019. In March 2019, Amber Cole (from WEBG Chicago) and Evan Omelia were announced as the winners of the aforementioned "Seattle's Funniest Person" contest, and joined the morning show as co-hosts on April 1.

==== The Jubal Show, Hits 106.1 (2020–present) ====
On July 26, 2020, Carla Marie and Anthony announced their departure from the station. The next day, KBKS announced that Jubal Fresh, formerly the co-host of KQMV's nationally-syndicated morning show Brooke & Jubal in the Morning, would host mornings on the station beginning in August. It marked Jubal's return to KBKS, as he had previously been involved in the station's previous Jackie & Bender show.

To promote the launch of the new morning show, KBKS temporarily rebranded as Jubal 106.1 on August 3, 2020. On August 20, to coincide with the debut of The Jubal Show, KBKS relaunched its CHR format as Hits 106.1. Syndication for The Jubal Show began in October 2020.

== HD Radio ==
- KBKS-HD1 carries the analog format ("HITS 106.1") from the standard 106.1 FM frequency.
- KBKS-HD2 carries PRIDE radio The Pulse of LGBTQ America.
