= KFC (AM) =

Radio station in Seattle (1921–1923)

KFC was an AM radio station in Seattle, Washington, that was first licensed on December 8, 1921, and deleted January 23, 1923. The station was owned by the Northern Radio & Electric Company, however both its studio and transmitter were located at the Seattle Post-Intelligencer building, and the newspaper was responsible for most of its operations.

KFC was one of the earliest broadcasting stations authorized in the United States, and was also the first in the state of Washington. In addition, there had been a series of earlier broadcasts made by the Northern Radio & Electric Company in conjunction with the Post-Intelligencer, beginning in July 1921.

== History ==
=== Preliminary broadcasts ===
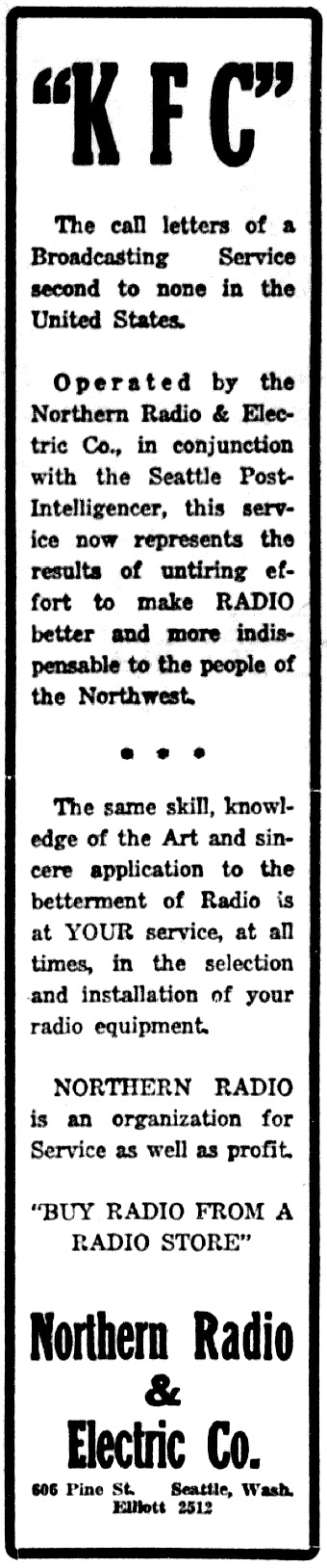
June 1922 station advertisement

KFC received its first formal broadcasting license in December 1921. However, the station's history dated back to a series of broadcasts begun the previous summer as a joint effort by the Northern Radio & Electric Company and the Seattle Post-Intelligencer newspaper.

In the early 1920s, radio broadcasting began to gain popularity, as the development of vacuum-tube transmitters made audio transmissions practical. In June 1921, the Post-Intelligencer developed a plan to broadcast round-by-round results of the "Fight of the Century" heavyweight boxing match between Jack Dempsey and Carpentier, being held in New Jersey on July 2. The newspaper arranged for summaries to be telegraphed across the county to their 600 Pine Street offices, where the information would be posted on a bulletin board located outside the building and megaphoned from the second floor, in addition to the radio transmissions.

The newspaper enlisted a local radio expert, Roscoe W. Bell of the Northern Radio Company, to set up a radio transmitter at the newspaper building. Arrangements were also made for the local Navy radio station, located at the L. C. Smith building, to participate by sending fight summaries via radiotelegraph, which had a much greater coverage than the radiotelephone station, although limited to listeners able to read Morse code dots-and-dashes. The reported wavelength to be used for a July 1 radiotelephone test transmission was 340 meters (882 kHz). The next day, the newspaper reported that the test went well, so, beginning at 11:00 a.m., the radiotelephone broadcast would be sent on 275 meters (1091 kHz), while the Navy's radiotelegraph reports would go out on 600 meters (500 kHz).

The fight broadcast was carried out as planned, and the paper declared the overall effort a success, with the transmission heard as far away as 50 miles (80 km) by Father Sebastian Ruth at St. Martin's College in Lacey. In between the fight bulletins, "a talking machine supplied by the Hopper-Kelly Company was played into the instrument, and thus fight fans who were listening in were treated to a concert". A technical description of the transmitter described it as "two five-watt Pliotron tubes, one as an oscillator and one as a modulator, employing the Heising system of modulation".

In September 1921, Roscoe W. Bell and Henry S. Tenny incorporated the Northern Radio & Electric Company, located at 418 Union Street. Bell was company president, and Tenny, described as having served as a "chief electrician in the Adriatic service" during World War One, was the manager. In December the company moved to 606 Pine Street, and the leasing agent, Henry Broderick, Inc., took out a small advertisement stating that "Last night, for the first time in history, a property deal was announced by Wireless Telephone", claiming an audience of "2,000 Receiver-Phones".

There were no immediate attempts to continue broadcasting following the fight broadcast, however, in early September, the Post-Intelligencer announced that it would be making a major return to the airwaves, with daily broadcasts starting on September 5. This was again done in conjunction with Northern Radio & Electric. The station was constructed at the newspaper's Pine Street building, and included a "standard five-watt radiophone transmitter, using two Cunningham pliotron transmitter tubes". Newspaper publicity consistently referred to the station as the "Post-Intelligencer radiophone", however the newspaper did not hold a radio station license at this time. H. S. Tenny did have an amateur station license with the call sign 7FW, (Note: The "7" in 7FW's call sign indicated that it was located in the seventh Radio Inspection district, and the fact that the "F" fell in the range from A-W indicated that it was operating with a standard amateur station license.) and a contemporary company advertisement also listed 7FW as Northern Radio & Electric Company's "radio call".

The debut program was described as being transmitted on the wavelength "ordinarily employed by amateurs", which at the time was 200 meters (1500 kHz). The broadcast started at 9:00 p.m. and lasted a half hour, and consisted of news items interspersed with phonograph records. The newspaper reported overall success, and Father Sebastian Ruth at St. Martin's College in Lacey again reported reception, this time said to be 68 miles (109 km) away. It was also announced that starting the next night the newspaper planned to continue the half hour programs on a daily basis.

One of the more ambitious programs presented during this era were continuous reports of the football game held at Oregon Agricultural College in Corvallis against the University of Washington on October 22, 1921. A special telegraph line was installed at the site of the contest, where telegraphed summaries were sent to the Post-Intelligencer, typewritten, and then broadcast. A crowd of 1,000 students gathered at the University's Meany Hall listened to the bulletins describing their team's eventual 24-0 loss.

=== KFC ===
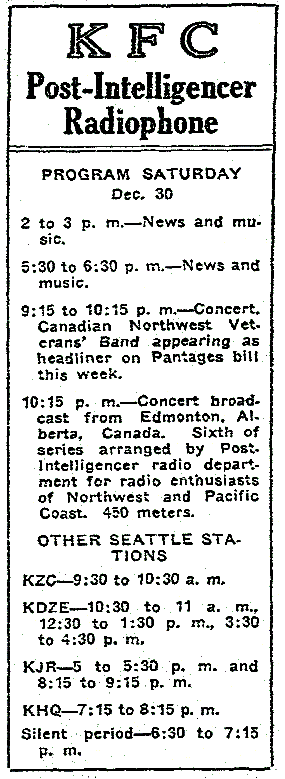
Final program listing (December 30, 1922). The station license was canceled the next month.

Initially there were no formal standards for radio stations making broadcasts for the general public, and a variety of stations, most operating under Experimental or Amateur station licenses, conducted broadcasts on a regular schedule. On December 1, 1921, the U.S. Department of Commerce, which regulated radio at this time, adopted the first regulation formally establishing a broadcasting station category, which set aside the wavelength of 360 meters (833 kHz) for entertainment broadcasts, and 485 meters (619 kHz) for market and weather reports.

The Northern Radio & Electric Company was among the first to apply for one of the new authorizations. Its first broadcasting license, with the randomly assigned call letters of KFC, was issued on December 8, 1921, which authorized operation on the 360-meter "entertainment" wavelength. This was one of the earliest broadcasting grants issued in the United States, and the first in the state of Washington. (Note: KJR did not receive a broadcasting station license until March 9, 1922, but maintained it should still be credited as the region's pioneer radio station, based on broadcasts dating back to 1920 made under an experimental license.)

In January 1922, the newspaper worked with the Northern Radio & Electric Company to upgrade the operations. New 100-foot (30 m) towers were built supporting the antenna on the Post-Intelligencer building, amid ongoing plans to upgrade the transmitting power from 5 to 100 watts.

Because there was only the single entertainment wavelength of 360 meters available for use by multiple broadcasting stations, each region had to set up a timesharing agreement to allocate individual timeslots. On June 23, 1922, there were three Seattle stations taking turns operating from noon to 10:30 p.m., with KFC dominating: it was allocated six timeslots totaling 6 1/4 hours.

On September 12, the station's transmitter was further upgraded to 300 watts. For the remainder of the year the Post-Intelligencer regularly supplied a wide variety of programing for KFC. However, without explanation, the station abruptly ceased broadcasting at the end of December, and was deleted from the Commerce Department's list of stations on January 23, 1923.

A few months later, the Post-Intelligencer worked with the Northern Radio & Electric Company to construct a new station, KFJC, but this time it was licensed to the newspaper. KFJC made its debut broadcast on the evening of July 16, 1923, and was operated for about a year and a half, before being deleted in late 1924.

== See also ==
- List of initial AM-band station grants in the United States
