= Marco Collins =

American DJ

Mark William Collins is an American radio personality, featured in an exhibit in the Rock and Roll Hall of Fame. Collins rose to prominence in the early 1990s as a disc jockey on alternative rock station 107.7 FM "The End" (KNDD) in Seattle, with the popularity of grunge.

He has worked at a number of rock music radio stations along the West Coast, including KYSR 98.7 in Los Angeles; KCR and XTRA-FM (91X) in San Diego; KITS (Live 105) in San Francisco; KWOD in Sacramento, California; and KNDD, KEXP, and KPNW-FM in Seattle.

For a short time during the 1990s, he owned Stampede Records, which released Silkworm's 1993 EP "His Absence is a Blessing" and Muzzle's "Free Trampoline/Come On Down" (7" single).

A documentary, The Glamour & The Squalor, has been made about his life, and his "rise, fall and reemergence" as a radio host and world premiered at the Seattle International Film Festival in Seattle on June 3, 2015. The film has also been shown at Outfest, the L.A. LGBT film festival, and was screened at both the Tacoma Film Festival and the Seattle Lesbian and Gay Film Festival in October 2015. The film was named one of The 10 Best LGBT Documentaries of 2015 by Out.

== Radio career ==
Collin's radio career began in 1984 as a DJ on KCR, San Diego State University's college radio station. He quickly became the station's music director, a position he held until leaving the station in 1989. While in San Diego, Collins also worked as an intern and on air host at XTRA-FM.

After working in radio promotions at Relativity Records, Collins took a job at KNDD "107.7 The End" in Seattle. He became the station's music director and assistant program director, in addition to hosting his own show in the evenings. Collins is also credited with birthing KNDD's The Young and the Restless, the station's longstanding all-local music program.

Collins was instrumental in breaking such artists as Beck, The Presidents of the United States of America, Foo Fighters, Harvey Danger's "Flagpole Sitta" and was the first person to play Weezer's "Undone (The Sweater Song)." He is also credited for debuting tracks by Garbage, Death Cab For Cutie, Sunny Day Real Estate and Everclear.

Collins left "The End" in 1998 to take the A&R director position at Movement Records in Los Angeles. It was there where he worked with acts such as Rage Against the Machine, Sean Lennon and Cypress Hill. He left to take a position at VH1 as the station's Director of Music Programming.

From 2003 until 2005, Marco Collins worked at KWOD 106.5 in Sacramento, California as the afternoon disc jockey and the station's music director. In 2005, he returned to San Diego and accepted the position of music director at XTRA-FM (91X) in an attempt to return the station to prominence. Collins was hired by KYSR to host the mid-day show from 10 a.m. to 2 p.m. in 2008. He also hosted the station's Rewind at Noon segment, featuring rock hits from the 1980s and 1990s. He left the station in September 2009. Collins joined the on-air staff at Seattle's KEXP on January 12, 2009, leaving the station on April 13, 2023. On April 25, it was announced that Collins was joining KPNW-FM in Seattle as the afternoon host.

In 2015, The Glamour & The Squalor, a documentary on the beginning of his career at "107.7 The End" and a look into his personal life premiered at the Seattle International Film Festival.
