= Lan Roberts =

Dick Curtis (left) and Lan Roberts (right) staffing a Seattle radio station remote in 1988. Roberts was visiting the area from Taiwan.

Lan Roberts (born Lanny Lipford in Bonham, Texas, on December 18, 1936; died December 30, 2005), was an American radio disc jockey (DJ).

== Career ==
During the 1960s and 1970s, Roberts was a high-profile presenter with KJR in Seattle. Like many of the local DJs of the time, he left KJR for rival top 40 station KOL in a late 1960s talent raid and returned to KJR in the early 1970s. He was known primarily for comedic skits and gags, working the "morning drive" shift from 6:00 am until 10:00 am on weekdays. Roberts was a master of voices and surrounded the top 40 hits of KJR with odd characters with names like Phil Dirt and The Hollywood Reporter. Roberts would carry on spirited conversations between his regular on-air voice and the characters. The Hollywood Reporter (no other name was given) would always begin a report on celebrity gossip in a lisping, snide, mocking voice "This is The Hollywood Reporter," and then continue with a totally bogus report. His career also included spells in Los Angeles, Hawaii, Taipei and San Francisco.

Later in life, Roberts returned to live in his old home town and worked as a radio consultant. He gained a new following by sharing his liberal political views on his website. In the last ten years of his life he suffered from lung cancer, and urged visitors to his site not to smoke. In addition, he used his Internet presence to chastise the corporate mentality and lack of creativity in the modern broadcast industry.
