= Pat O'Day =

American broadcaster and concert promoter (1934–2020)

Paul W. Berg (September 24, 1934 – August 4, 2020), known professionally as Pat O'Day, was an American broadcaster and concert promoter in the Pacific Northwest. O'Day was the afternoon drive personality at Seattle's KJR 950 radio station in the 1960s; he would eventually become program director and general manager.

O'Day helped to bring the Seattle music scene to national prominence. In a 2020 article O'Day was described as "a legendary Seattle disc jockey and arguably the city's best-known voice."

During the 1960s O'Day was a promoter and MC for teen dance and concert events in the Seattle area. In the 1970s he launched Concerts West, expanding this business activity to many of the western United States.

In 1998, a plaquette featuring O'Day was added to the permanent disc jockey exhibit at the Rock and Roll Hall of Fame.

== Career ==
O'Day began his radio career in the late 1950s. Starting around 1960 he began hosting teen dances at the Spanish Castle, a nightclub near Seattle, where he met Jimi Hendrix. Hendrix was an unknown at the time but he was able to jam with local groups at the Castle during dance hall events booked by O'Day. Hendrix later wrote a song, Spanish Castle Magic, released in 1967, inspired by his experiences playing at the Castle.

Starting in 1967, O'Day served as race announcer and commentator for hydroplanes during Seafair for various radio and TV stations, lastly with KIRO-TV in 2013.

O'Day owned Seattle radio station KYYX (96.5 FM) from 1977 to 1984. From late 1982 the station had a New Wave music format, one of the few commercial stations in the US at the time to do so.

O'Day and Seattle author Jim Ojala co-authored the book It Was All Just Rock 'n' Roll , detailing his O'Day's work in radio and the concert promotion company, Concerts West.

O'Day was a spokesman for Schick Shadel Hospital in both radio and television advertisements. In 2007, O'Day joined more than two dozen other radio and music industry leaders as a member of the nominating committee of the Hit Parade Hall of Fame.

His story was featured in a 2015 documentary about radio DJs called I Am What I Play, directed by Roger King. O'Day died on August 4, 2020, at the age of 85.

== Personal life ==
O'Day was born in Norfolk, Nebraska. He had three sons (Garry, Jerry, and Jeff) and one daughter (Kelsey). Although a reputation for excessive drinking hurt him early in his career, he entered Schick Shadel Hospital for treatment in 1986. In his later years he lived in the San Juan Islands with his wife Stephanie Johnson O'Day, where he developed and sold real estate.

O'Day set a Guinness world record for water skiing non-stop (on Lake Washington) for 4 hours 52 minutes, in 1959.
