= KKWF =

Country music radio station in Seattle

- Seattle, Washington; United States
- Broadcast area: Seattle metropolitan area
- Frequency: 100.7 MHz (HD Radio)
- Branding: 100.7 The Wolf

Programming
- Language: English
- Format: Country

Ownership
- Owner: Audacy, Inc.; (Audacy License, LLC)
- Sister stations: KHTP; KISW; KNDD; KSWD

History
- First air date: 1948; 78 years ago
- Former call signs: KIRO-FM (1948–1975); KSEA (1975–1991); KWMX (1991–1992); KIRO-FM (1992–1999); KQBZ (1999–2005)
- Call sign meaning: "Wolf"

Technical information
- Licensing authority: FCC
- Facility ID: 6367
- Class: C
- ERP: 68,000 watts
- HAAT: 707 meters (2,320 ft)
- Transmitter coordinates: 47.503722°N 121.975944°W

Links
- Public license information: Public file; LMS
- Webcast: Listen live (via Audacy)
- Website: www.audacy.com/seattlewolf

KKWF (100.7 FM "100.7 The Wolf") is a commercial radio station in Seattle, Washington. The station is owned by Audacy, Inc. and it airs a country music radio format. The studios and offices are on Fifth Avenue in Downtown Seattle.

KKWF has an effective radiated power (ERP) of 68,000 watts, using beam tilt. The transmitter is located in Issaquah on Tiger Mountain.

== History ==
=== KIRO (AM) simulcast (1948–1967) ===
The station first signed on in 1948 as KIRO-FM (not to be confused with the current KIRO-FM, which has broadcast on 97.3 FM since 2008). It was owned by the Queen City Broadcasting Company and it simulcasted co-owned AM 710 KIRO. The two stations were CBS Radio Network affiliates, airing its schedule of dramas, comedies, news, sports, soap operas, game shows and big band broadcasts during the "Golden Age of Radio." In 1958, KIRO-TV signed on the air as Seattle's CBS Television affiliate, which it still is today (with exception of a hiatus from 1995 to 1997, when it was a UPN station).

As network programming moved from radio to television, KIRO-AM-FM switched to a full service middle of the road format of pop music, news and sports. In 1963, Queen City Broadcasting, owned by Saul Haas, was sold to Bonneville International, a broadcasting corporation set up by the Church of Jesus Christ of Latter-day Saints (LDS Church).

=== Progressive rock (1967–1973) ===
In the late 1960s, the Federal Communications Commission (FCC) began requiring FM stations in large cities to stop full-time simulcasts of their co-owned AM stations. For a few years, KIRO-FM aired a progressive rock format, beginning in 1967.

=== Beautiful music (1973–1989) ===
The station flipped to Beautiful Music in 1973, utilizing the WRFM (New York City) program service, which was later renamed the Bonneville Program Services. In 1974, the KIRO-FM call sign was changed to KSEA to separate the FM station's identity from the AM. At the time, KSEA competed against KEUT, KEZX, KBIQ, and KIXI, all of which aired easy music formats.

The format gradually evolved from mostly instrumental beautiful music to a mix of instrumentals and vocals as easy listening ("Easy 101") in the early 1980s.

In the mid-1980s, as the easy listening audience was aging, KSEA moved to soft adult contemporary music.

=== Adult contemporary (1989–1992) ===
On February 17, 1989, KSEA shifted to a mainstream adult contemporary format. KSEA also telecasted its audio on KIRO-TV throughout the late 1980s into the early 1990s when KIRO was off-air, mainly during sign-off time in overnights. The station shifted to hot adult contemporary as KWMX ("Mix 101") in April 1991, though this would last for only a short time.

=== News/talk (1992–1995) ===
On September 21, 1992, the station returned to a simulcast of then-sister station KIRO. With the change, the KIRO-FM call letters were reinstated. From February to September 1993, KIRO-FM was promoted as being part of the "KIRO News Network", with KIRO's radio and TV personalities working together as part of an experiment dubbed "News Outside the Box". The station broke the simulcast (except for mornings) on July 5, 1994, airing a separately programmed talk format, while retaining the KIRO-FM call sign.

The initial lineup included a simulcast of KIRO in morning drive time (which would be replaced by local comedian Pat Cashman in September), Rick Enloe in late mornings (who would later be replaced by Amy Alpine), Dave Brenner and Dr. Laura Schlessinger's syndicated show in afternoons, Gil Gross (syndicated from San Francisco) in evenings), Leslie Marshall at night (who would later be replaced by Jim Bohannon), along with Bernie Ward and David Essel on weekends.

=== Hot talk (1995–2005) ===
On January 6, 1995, the station rebranded as "100.7 The Buzz," and added the syndicated Tom Leykis Show to the lineup. KIRO-FM was sold by Bonneville to Entercom in March 1997. The station changed its call letters to KQBZ in May 1999, and shifted to hot talk with the slogan "Radio For Guys."

During the early 2000s, KQBZ carried Don & Mike in middays and Phil Hendrie in evenings. By November 2005, the station's weekday lineup consisted of local personalities Robin & Maynard (who were previously on KZOK-FM) in mornings, BJ Shea in middays, Tom Leykis in afternoons, The Mens Room in evenings, and John and Jeff and All-Comedy Radio in late nights, with paid and specialty programming on weekends.

=== Country (2005–present) ===
At 8 a.m. on November 30, 2005, in the middle of "Robin & Maynard", the station began stunting with a countdown clock (using Microsoft Sam) to Noon the same day. At that time, the station flipped to country as "100.7 The Wolf" with the new call letters KKWF. The first song played on The Wolf was "How Do You Like Me Now?!" by Toby Keith. With the flip, The Men's Room and BJ Shea moved over to sister station KISW. Tom Leykis moved over as well, but on tape delay, from 11 p.m. to 2 a.m.

Entercom acquired KKWF's long-time country rival KMPS in November 2017, as a result of its merger with CBS Radio. In the immediate aftermath of the merger's completion, KMPS dropped its country format in defense of KKWF (making it the only full-market country station in the Seattle market), and ultimately flipped to soft adult contemporary on December 4, 2017. Rock station KVRQ would flip to country later the same day.

== HD radio ==
KKWF signed on HD Radio operations in 2006. 100.7 HD 2 carried a comedy radio format simply branded as "All Comedy Radio." The format had been heard overnights when the station was KQBZ.

On June 18, 2011, the signal flipped to Smooth Jazz, filling the void left open by KWJZ when that station flipped to Modern AC on December 27, 2010.

In late February 2012, the Blues format from sister station 103.7 HD2 was bumped to 100.7 HD2, effectively ending the smooth jazz format.

In early June 2018, 100.7-HD2 and 94.1-HD2 swapped formats, with the blues format moving to 94.1-HD2 and the classic country format moving to 100.7-HD2.
