= KHTP =

- Tacoma, Washington; United States
- Broadcast area: Seattle metropolitan area
- Frequency: 103.7 MHz (HD Radio)
- Branding: Hot 103-7

Programming
- Format: Classic hip-hop
- Affiliations: Compass Media Networks

Ownership
- Owner: Audacy, Inc.; (Audacy License, LLC)
- Sister stations: KISW; KKWF; KNDD; KSWD

History
- First air date: June 2, 1958
- Former call signs: KTWR (1958–1964); KTAC-FM (1964–1977); KBRD (1977–1991); KMTT (1991–1992); KMTT-FM (1992–1996); KMTT (1996–2013)
- Former frequencies: 103.9 MHz (1958–1979)
- Call sign meaning: "Hot"

Technical information
- Licensing authority: FCC
- Facility ID: 18513
- Class: C
- ERP: 68,000 watts
- HAAT: 707 meters (2,320 ft)
- Transmitter coordinates: 47.503722°N 121.975944°W
- Translator: 104.1 K281AD (Olympia)

Links
- Public license information: Public file; LMS
- Webcast: Listen live (via Audacy)
- Website: www.audacy.com/hot1037seattle

KHTP (103.7 FM, "Hot 103-7"), is a commercial radio station licensed to Tacoma, Washington, United States, and serves the Seattle metropolitan area. It is owned by Audacy, Inc., and airs a classic hip-hop format. The studios and offices are on Fifth Avenue in Downtown Seattle.

KHTP's transmitting antenna is on Tiger Mountain in Issaquah. It broadcasts in the HD Radio format, formerly carrying an adult album alternative (AAA) format on its HD2 subchannel. KHTP's signal also heard on FM translator K281AD 104.1 MHz in Olympia.

== History ==
=== KTWR (1958–1964) ===
On June 2, 1958, the station first signed on. The original call sign was KTWR, and it broadcast on 103.9 MHz. It was owned by Thomas Wilmot Read (hence the call sign).

Its effective radiated power was 830 watts, a fraction of its current output. The signal was limited to the area in and around Tacoma, not the larger Seattle radio market.

=== KTAC (1964–1977) ===
In 1964, the station was acquired by Tacoma Broadcasters, Inc, which already owned KTAC 850 AM (now KHHO). Tacoma Broadcasters changed the call letters to KTAC-FM to simulcast KTAC. A few years later, the FM station began running separate programming, with an automated Top 40 format.

Entercom bought KTAC-AM-FM in June 1973.

=== Beautiful music (1977–1991) ===
In 1977, the FM call letters were changed to KBRD, as Entercom flipped the station to a beautiful music format as "K-Bird FM 104."

KBRD upgraded to a stronger signal at 103.7 FM in 1979. The station went from less than 930 watts, 1 kW ERP, to a new diesel-fueled power generator and the output of the transmitter at 63,000 watts, boosted 100 kW. ERP by a complicated additive antenna array that was noisy.

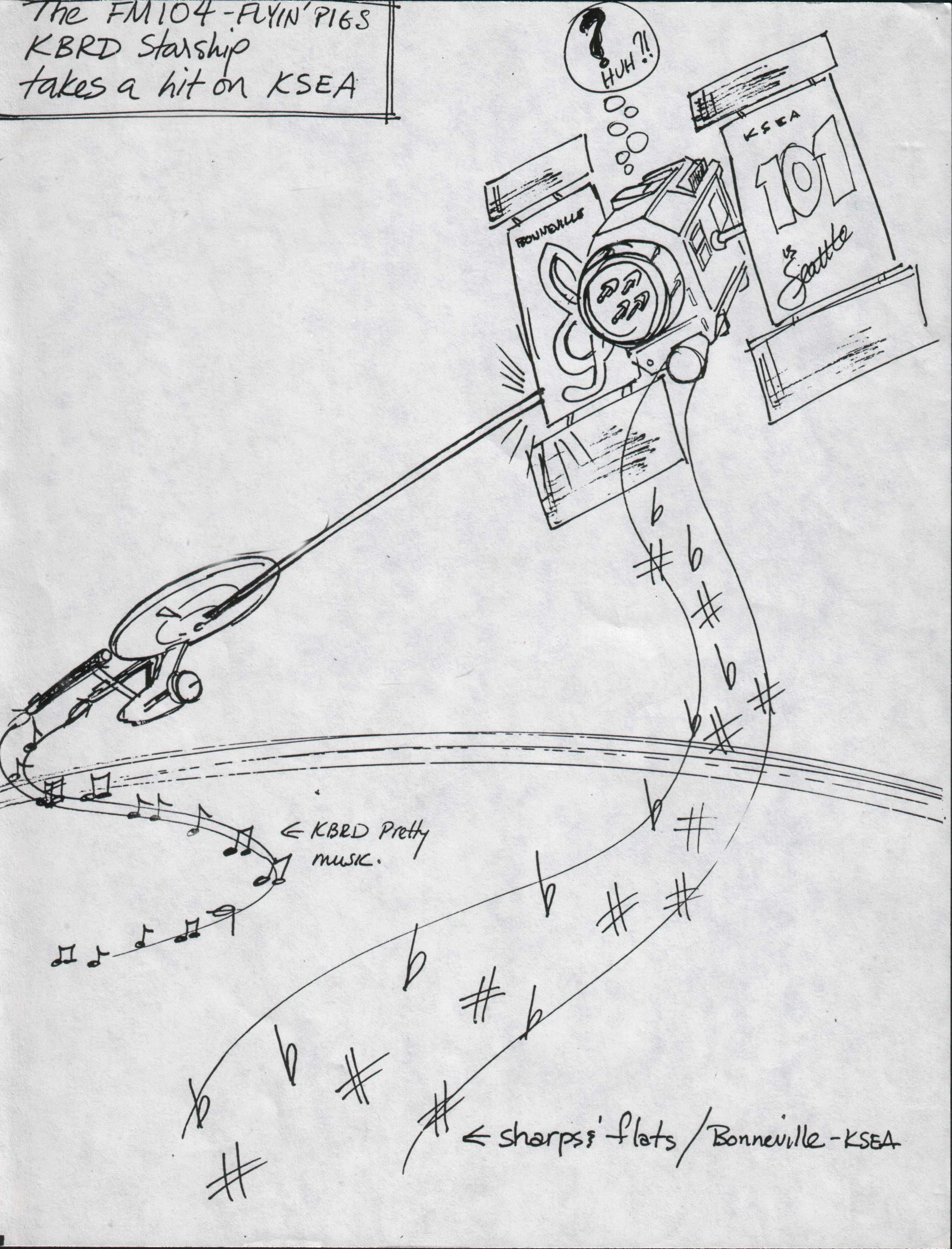

=== Adult alternative (1991–2012) ===
At 2 p.m. on April 10, 1991, KBRD flipped to a long running adult album alternative (AAA) format as "FM 104 The Mountain" and the KMTT call sign. The first song on "The Mountain" was "Rock Me on the Water" by Jackson Browne. The former KBRD call letters are now on 680 AM in Lacey.

The station did have some ratings issues for the first couple of years due to its transmitter location south of Tacoma. This was changed when the transmitter relocated to Tiger Mountain in Issaquah, amid the towers for other Seattle area TV and FM stations. KMTT, while it was never #1 in Arbitron ratings books, did well with affluent adult demographics. It was the Seattle market's fourth attempt at a AAA format dating back to 1975-1983 as KZAM FM 92.5 (now KQMV), 1983-1990 as KEZX FM 98.9 (now KPNW-FM), and 1985-1987 as KQKT FM 96.5 (now KJAQ). However, as time went on, the station saw a decline in ratings, especially after the introduction of the Portable People Meter in the Seattle market in 2009.

KMTT featured several different morning drive time shows. The Mountain was the home of John Fisher & Peyton Mays, Fisher & Gary Crow, Crow & Mike West, and Fisher & West. The Marty Riemer & Jodi Brothers morning show were dismissed in September 2009, and were replaced by Sean Demery (formerly of 99X in Atlanta), until he was released in early 2011. A short time later, Reimer returned to the station to host afternoon drive.

In late 2011, Shawn Stewart left KMTT, as the station shifted to a more classic rock direction, but still retaining AAA artists. Stewart began hosting It's Raining Cats & Dogs on Bonneville International-owned KIRO-FM.

=== Classic rock (2012–2013) ===
In the Fall of 2012, KMTT shifted its format to "A Mountain of Classics," featuring adult rock hits from the 1970s, 1980s, 1990s, and 2000s, in hopes to better compete against classic rock-formatted KZOK. Reimer again left the station on December 20, 2012. Ultimately, the "Mountain of Classics" direction did not find enough of an audience.

=== Rhythmic (2013–present) ===
Logo under previous slogan

On August 30, 2013, at 1:50 p.m., after playing "If You Leave" by OMD, KMTT began stunting with a loop of "It's The End of the World As We Know It (And I Feel Fine)" by R.E.M. until 3:00 p.m., when the station flipped to Rhythmic AC, branded as "Hot 103.7." The first song on "Hot" was "Blurred Lines" by Robin Thicke featuring T.I. and Pharrell. The Mountain's AAA format was moved onto the station's HD2 subchannel.

Two weeks later, on September 11, 2013, KMTT changed its call letters to KHTP. Concurrently, the KMTT call sign was moved to co-owned AM 910 in Portland (formerly KKSN). KHTP experienced immediate ratings success with its new format; in its first full book as "Hot" in October, the station jumped to a 4.8 share.

On December 4, 2013, Entercom announced that "Candy & Potter," former morning show hosts at KBKS-FM, would join the station for mornings beginning January 22, 2014. (The pair were released in March 2015). Kristin the Island Girl, former midday personality on KBKS, began hosting middays at KHTP on that day as well.

On June 27, 2017, Entercom announced that recording artist and Seattle native Sir Mix-a-Lot would host mornings on the station beginning July 5. In addition, Eric Powers, long-time afternoon host and program director at KUBE, was also named KHTP's new PD and would also begin hosting afternoons on the same day. (Mike Preston, KHTP's PD since the station's 2013 inception, and former longtime PD at KBKS, left the station in February 2017.) With the change, morning host Deanna Cruz exited, and afternoon host/APD Tanch moved to middays. Kristin the Island Girl left the station as well.

On August 30, 2018, former KSFM on-air host and MD Bre Ruiz was named co-host for the Sir Mix-a-Lot morning show effective September 4. Sir Mix-a-Lot exited the station on June 28, 2019, after nearly two years with the station.

== Translator ==
Call sign	Frequency	City of license	FID	ERP (W)	HAAT	Class	Transmitter coordinates	FCC info
K281AD	104.1 FM	Olympia, Washington	18515	50	59 m (194 ft)	D	47°3′9.3″N 122°50′49.4″W	LMS

== HD radio ==
KMTT launched HD Radio operations in 2006. 103.7-HD2 carried a blues format. In March 2012, 103.7-2 flipped to a format focusing on "Mountain Music Discovery." It featured music from Adult Album Alternative artists new and old, with exclusive live songs from The Mountain's own archives. The blues format moved for a time to sister station KSWD 94.1-HD2.

In February 2013, the HD2 subchannel was branded "The Original Mountain." As of August 30, 2013, with the change in format on KMTT, the HD2 channel was renamed "103.7 HD2 The Mountain Seattle," as the two formats from analog/HD1 and HD2 merged.

The HD2 subchannel has since been turned off. As of April 2024, a streaming radio channel version of The Mountain Seattle can be found through Audacy.

== Live from the Mountain Music Lounge ==
As part of its "Mountain" format, the former KMTT hosted live musical performances in the Mountain Music Lounge, a small, intimate stage setting. Artists were invited to play small sets of songs, all of which are recorded by the station. In 1995, KMTT published On the Mountain: Collector's Edition of Live Performances, a compilation of live tracks from artists including BoDeans, Shawn Colvin, and Big Head Todd and the Monsters that sold through local Seattle retailers.

With the success of the first album, the station carried on an annual release of collections, eventually renaming the series Live from the Mountain Music Lounge with the ninth volume. Portions of the proceeds from sales of the various albums were donated in support of The Wilderness Society.

Performances from The Mountain Archives, both those issued on the CDs and other songs from various sets, continued to play on HD2 station, "The Mountain Seattle", before it was shut down.
