= KISW =

Rock radio station in Seattle

- Seattle, Washington; United States
- Broadcast area: Seattle metropolitan area
- Frequency: 99.9 MHz (HD Radio)
- Branding: 99.9 The Rock KISW

Programming
- Language: English
- Format: Mainstream rock

Ownership
- Owner: Audacy, Inc.; (Audacy License, LLC)
- Sister stations: KHTP; KKWF; KNDD; KSWD

History
- First air date: January 18, 1950; 76 years ago
- Call sign meaning: In Seattle, Washington

Technical information
- Licensing authority: FCC
- Facility ID: 47750
- Class: C
- ERP: 68,000 watts
- HAAT: 707 meters (2,320 ft)
- Transmitter coordinates: 47.503722°N 121.975944°W

Links
- Public license information: Public file; LMS
- Webcast: Listen live (via Audacy)
- Website: www.audacy.com/kisw

KISW (99.9 FM) is a radio station broadcasting a mainstream rock format in Seattle, Washington. It is owned by Audacy, Inc. and has studios in Downtown Seattle and a transmitter on Tiger Mountain in Issaquah. In addition to a standard analog transmission, KISW broadcasts using HD Radio technology and is available online via Audacy.

On the air since 1950, KISW was originally a fine music station before Kaye-Smith shifted it to a rock format in 1971. It has continued in the rock format since under various owners; live shows include The Mens Room afternoon show, which for a time was nationally syndicated.

== History ==
=== Classical (1950–1971) ===
KISW began broadcasting on January 16 or 18, 1950. The station's founder and first owner was Ellwood W. Lippincott, a resident of Centralia and engineer for the Weyerhauser Timber Company. The station programmed a classical music format. At first, the station was powered at slightly over 2,000 watts, a fraction of its current output, and operated from studios at 9201 Roosevelt Way NE in North Seattle. From 1954 to 1956, the station was managed by Harvey Manning. The station increased its power to 10,500 watts in 1960.

During the week, Lippincott's job required him to travel around the Pacific Northwest maintaining the company's radio equipment, and he would spend his weekends managing the station. Twice during its first 11 years on the air, the station ran into financial difficulty, and listeners contributed more than $3,000 each time to keep KISW on the air.

=== Rock (1971–present) ===
In 1969, the station was purchased by Kaye-Smith, a partnership of famed entertainer Danny Kaye and businessman Lester Smith; at that time, Kaye-Smith were also the owners of the leading Top 40 station in Seattle, KJR, and also owned Kaye-Smith Studios in Seattle, where records by Heart, Steve Miller and Bachman–Turner Overdrive were recorded. With Pat O'Day, the firm owned Concerts West, a booking and promotion company that handled Jimi Hendrix, Led Zeppelin, Bad Company, The Eagles, Paul McCartney and others, and were original owners of the Seattle Mariners.

Kaye-Smith expressed its intention to change the format of the station, which led to objections from members of the public. On February 15, 1971, KISW became a progressive rock (or "underground") station, similar to the format pioneered by Tom Donahue at KMPX and KSAN in San Francisco. KOL-FM was also experimenting with free-form rock at night. Over time, KISW moved to an album oriented rock format by playing the best-selling albums from the top rock acts. In 1982, Danny Kaye sold his interest in the company; the new corporation was called Alexander Broadcasting and was owned by Smith. In 1987, Nationwide Communications, a subsidiary of Nationwide Insurance, acquired KISW for $13 million from Smith. As an April Fool's Day prank in 1991, the radio station changed its format to "classical rock", mixing classical and rock selections for a day. Longtime DJ Steve Slaton, who had been at KISW from 1973 to 1992, was fired by Nationwide over differences in creative opinion that had been simmering since the station's sale years prior.

Entercom, forerunner to Audacy, acquired KISW in 1996, along with $25.5 million, as part of a three-way swap with Nationwide Communications and Secret Communications that involved stations in Houston and Pittsburgh. The KISW acquisition and other deals gave Entercom a "lock on rock" in the market.

In 2000, the popular "Twisted Radio" morning show led by Bob Rivers left KISW after 11 years to join rival KZOK-FM. KISW briefly aired the syndicated Rob, Arnie and Dawn from Sacramento sister station KRXQ, but with no rating success, the station began airing Howard Stern's nationally syndicated show in May 2001. During this time, from 2001 to 2002, the station had a classic hits lean before dropping it a year later. At the end of 2005, Stern moved to Sirius Satellite Radio. On January 3, 2006, The BJ Shea Morning Experience (originally from sister station KQBZ) replaced Stern. On January 3, 2024, "The Daly Migs Show", with hosts Taryn Daly and Steve Migs, replaced "The BJ Shea Morning Experience" (which ended as "BJ & Migs" on December 15, 2023).

== Programming ==
The station aired BJ & Migs (BJ Shea and Steve Migs) in mornings until Shea's final show at KISW on December 15, 2023. The Daly Migs Show (Taryn Daly and Steve Migs) premiered on January 3, 2024 as the replacement for BJ & Migs. The station airs Ryan Castle in middays. KISW is the originating station for The Mens Room in afternoon drive; hosted by Miles Montgomery, Steve "The Thrill" Hill, Thee Ted Smith and Mike Hawk, the show entered syndication on June 5, 2017, and was distributed by Westwood One until June 2020. Weekend programming includes Loud & Local, which highlights local music from the greater Seattle area, hosted by Wyatt Olney.
