= The Mens Room (radio show) =

- Genre: Comedy, talk, music
- Country of origin: United States
- Home station: KISW
- Hosted by: Steve Hill; Miles Montgomery; Ted Smith
- Produced by: Mike Hawk
- Original release: 2003

The Mens Room [sic] is an afternoon drive-time show airing on KISW (99.9 FM Seattle). The comedy and hot talk program first aired in 2005, and was nationally syndicated from 2017 to 2020. The show's hosts are Miles Montgomery, Steve "The Thrill" Hill, and "Thee" Ted Smith, and is produced by Mike Hawk.

== History ==
The Mens Room radio show began in Baltimore when program director Bill Pasha assembled current hosts Miles Montgomery and Steve Hill for a talk-based radio program called Out To Lunch, which ran from 2003 to 2005 on WXYV-FM with those hosts after Miles replaced Bill Rohland in October 2003. The show moved to Seattle in the spring of 2005, and first aired on 100.7 The Buzz. The show then moved to 99.9 KISW, and eventually grew into the highest-rated afternoon show in all of Seattle. The show was a nationally syndicated radio program produced by Westwood One from 2017 into June 2020, before being dropped from Westwood One.

The Mens Room radio show is also distributed as four daily podcasts edited to remove local network advertisements and music as well as a full show podcast with the same edits made

As of September 2025, The Mens Room radio show streams live video feed on the KISW YouTube channel.

== Personalities ==
- Steve "The Thrill" Hill: Host, 2005–present
- Miles Montgomery: Host, 2005–present
- "Thee" Ted Smith: Host, 2005–present
- Ben "The Psycho Muppet" Watts: Producer, 2005–2016
- Mike Hawk: Producer, 2015–present
- Robin Foxx: Producer, 2017–2020

== Other media ==
The Mens Room hosts have also created other media properties distributed as standalone podcasts or live streaming internet radio.

=== The Mens Room Appy Hour ===
The Appy Hour was formerly a daily twenty-minute show available only as a live stream via the Audacy app immediately following the conclusion of the daily Mens Room show on live terrestrial radio. The show was hosted by the same quartet as the regular daily show. Due to being streamed exclusively over the internet rather than terrestrial radio, the show was uncensored and features discussions of topics that would not normally be "suitable for the airwaves."

When Audacy removed the Go Live feature on the content creator's side of the app, the Appy Hour changed to being a once-a-week pre-recorded segment uploaded on Friday mornings. The show is still uncensored because it's still exclusive to the internet. The show is pre-recorded on the previous Thursday.

=== The Greatest Story Never Told ===
From October 2019 to July 2021, Montgomery and Hill distributed a weekly podcast through Audacy. This show allowed the hosts to dive more deeply into some of the greatest stories of their past, and would occasionally feature other personalities, such as Smith. The show was also produced by Mike Hawk. The show was discontinued after July 2021 when it was replaced by The Mens Room Appy Hour.

=== Thee Podcast ===
Since September 2013, Thee Ted Smith has hosted a weekly podcast also distributed through Audacy. The show has featured other hosts, often personal friends of Smith, and covers topics such as current goings-on in their respective lives, as well as events in the greater Seattle area where the hosts live.

=== The MegaCast ===
A weekly podcast hosted by Smith and fellow KISW personality Steve Migs.

== Products and philanthropy ==
Mens Room Original is a beer brewed by Black Raven Brewing company of which a portion of profits are donated to the Pacific Northwest's Fisher House. Men's Room Sausage is produced by Uli's Sausage of Seattle, is made with Mens Room Original in the bright yellow can, and also contributes a portion of profits to the Fisher House. Black Raven has also added a 20th anniversary lager with the same arrangement of Fisher House donations.

In addition, San Juan Salsa of Arlington, Washington also produces a salsa branded for the show based largely on roasted tomatoes and other vegetables; like the beers and the sausage above, proceeds are donated to the Fisher House.
