= KSWD (FM) =

Hot adult contemporary radio station in Seattle

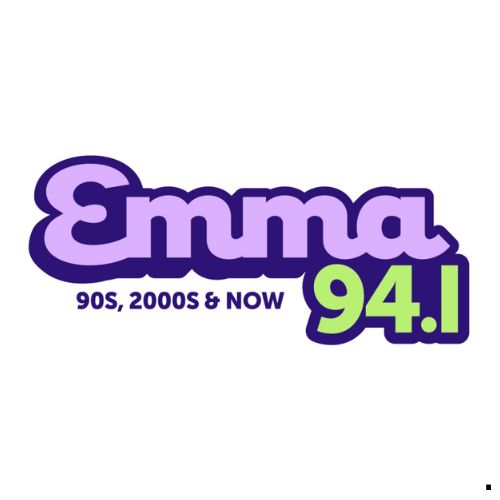
- Seattle, Washington; United States
- Broadcast area: Seattle metropolitan area
- Frequency: 94.1 MHz (HD Radio)
- Branding: Emma 94.1

Programming
- Language: English
- Format: Hot adult contemporary

Ownership
- Owner: Audacy, Inc.; (Audacy License, LLC)
- Sister stations: KHTP; KISW; KKWF; KNDD

History
- First air date: July 8, 1961; 65 years ago
- Former call signs: KOL-FM (1961–1975); KEUT (1975–1978); KMPS-FM (1978–2017)
- Call sign meaning: Sounds like "sound" (former station branding)

Technical information
- Licensing authority: FCC
- Facility ID: 20356
- Class: C
- ERP: 73,000 watts
- HAAT: 698 meters (2,290 ft)
- Transmitter coordinates: 47.504639°N 121.968833°W

Links
- Public license information: Public file; LMS
- Webcast: Listen live
- Website: www.audacy.com/emma941seattle

KSWD (94.1 FM, "Emma 94.1") is a radio station in Seattle, Washington. Owned by Audacy, Inc., it broadcasts a hot adult contemporary format. KSWD's studios are located on Fifth Avenue in Downtown Seattle; the station broadcasts from two transmitters located near Issaquah on Tiger Mountain, with its main transmitter operating at 73 kW effective radiated power (ERP) and its auxiliary transmitter operating at an ERP of 53 kW.

KSWD broadcasts in HD Radio, formerly carrying a blues format on its HD2 subchannel branded as The Delta.

== History ==
=== Top 40/MOR (1961–1968) ===
The station's legacy on FM radio dates back to July 8, 1961, when it signed on as KOL-FM, a simulcast of its AM sister station KOL (1300 AM). From 1962 to 1967, KOL-FM was owned by television producers and game show moguls Mark Goodson and Bill Todman; during this period, KOL-AM-FM aired top 40 and middle of the road formats. The pair of stations was sold to Buckley Broadcasting in 1967.

=== Progressive rock (1968–1975) ===
The station had a progressive rock format from 1968 to 1975, competing with KISW and, starting in 1974, KZOK-FM.

=== Beautiful music (1975–1978) ===
In 1975, the station changed its call sign to KEUT and its format to beautiful music.

=== Country (1978–2017) ===
The station changed to its long-running country music format as KMPS-FM on February 1, 1978, continuing to simulcast its AM sister. Throughout the 1980s, 1990s, and early 2000s, KMPS-FM was the dominant (and sometimes only) country station in the Seattle area.

EZ Communications bought KMPS-AM-FM from Hercules Broadcasting in 1986. EZ sold the AM station to Salem Communications ten years later in 1996. In July 1997, EZ merged with American Radio Systems. Westinghouse/CBS bought American Radio Systems' stations (including KMPS) on September 19, 1997. In June 1998, CBS split off the radio division under the revived Infinity Broadcasting name, which would be renamed CBS Radio in December 2005.

On February 2, 2017, CBS Radio announced it would merge with Entercom. KMPS would be retained by the new company, making it a sister station to country competitor KKWF as well as KHTP, KISW, and KNDD. To meet ownership limits set by the Federal Communications Commission (FCC), sister stations KFNQ, KJAQ, and KZOK-FM were divested to iHeartMedia. The merger was approved on November 9, and was consummated on November 17. At noon on the same day as the completion of the merger, after playing "Friends in Low Places" by Garth Brooks, KMPS-FM switched to all-Christmas music, leading to speculation that the station was planning to change formats after the holiday season. On-air personality Deanna Lee denied that this was the case, and stated that KMPS would remain a country station. However, the rumors would turn out to be true.

=== Soft adult contemporary (2017–2024) ===
Logo as "The Sound" (2017-2024)

On December 4, 2017, at 9:12 a.m., KMPS-FM flipped to soft adult contemporary as 94.1 The Sound, launching with two songs both called "Hello" (one by Lionel Richie, the other by Adele). The change briefly made KKWF the only country station in Seattle, before KVRQ abruptly flipped to the format in response later that morning. The station's call letters were changed to KSWD on December 11, these calls were previously used by KKLQ, an Entercom rock station divested during the merger which had also branded itself as "The Sound". The KMPS calls were moved to sister station KRAK in Hesperia, California.

On January 16, 2018, former KMTT morning host John Fisher was announced as KSWD's morning host beginning January 22. Ten days later on January 26, it was announced that Seattle resident and nationally syndicated personality Delilah would become the station's midday host beginning January 29. Alongside her daytime program on weekdays, KSWD airs her syndicated program on Friday, Saturday, and Sunday nights.

In May 2018, Smokey Rivers (who previously worked for iHeartMedia's Phoenix cluster and KMXZ-FM, and was CBS Radio's president of adult contemporary from 2000 to 2005) was named the station's program director, and began to additionally host afternoons. In October 2018, Jeanne Ashley was named assistant program director and new morning co-host.

=== Hot adult contemporary (2024–present) ===
On September 4, 2024, at 10 a.m., KSWD flipped to hot adult contemporary as Emma 94.1; the flip brought the format back to the market a little over five months after KPLZ-FM flipped to classic country.

== HD Radio ==
KSWD broadcasts in HD Radio with one digital subchannel and a former channel:

- KSWD-HD1 is a digital simulcast of the analog signal.
- KSWD-HD2 formerly broadcast a blues format known as "The Delta". The HD2 subchannel has since been turned off.
