= KJR (AM) =

Sports radio station in Seattle

- Seattle, Washington; United States
- Broadcast area: Seattle metropolitan area
- Frequency: 950 kHz
- Branding: Sports Radio 950 KJR

Programming
- Format: Sports
- Affiliations: Fox Sports Radio; Westwood One Sports; Seattle Kraken; Seattle Sounders FC

Ownership
- Owner: iHeartMedia; (iHM Licenses, LLC)
- Sister stations: KBKS-FM, KHHO, KJAQ, KJEB, KJR-FM, KPTR, KZOK-FM

History
- First air date: March 9, 1922 (experimental under calls 7XC 1917-1922)

Technical information
- Licensing authority: FCC
- Facility ID: 48386
- Class: B
- Power: 50,000 watts
- Transmitter coordinates: 47°25′59.4″N 122°28′6.5″W
- Repeater: 95.7 KJEB-HD2 (Seattle)

Links
- Public license information: Public file; LMS
- Webcast: Listen Live
- Website: 950kjr.iheart.com

KJR (950 kHz) is an all-sports AM radio station owned by iHeartMedia in Seattle, Washington. KJR is the Puget Sound region's home of Fox Sports Radio and Westwood One Sports, mostly carrying their national programming, while co-owned KJR-FM has local sports talk shows during the day and evening. KJR-AM-FM are the flagship stations for Seattle Kraken hockey. During the Seattle Seahawks season, the stations use the slogan "Home of the 12th Man". The studios are in Seattle's Belltown neighborhood northwest of downtown.

KJR is among the oldest radio stations in the United States, tracing its lineage back to an experimental station in 1920. It is powered at 50,000 watts, the maximum for commercial AM stations. It uses a directional antenna with a three-tower array to protect other stations on 950 AM from interference. The transmitter is on 105th Avenue SW on Vashon Island.

== History ==
=== 7AC/7XC ===
KJR's first formal broadcasting license was issued on March 9, 1922. However, the station's origin dates back to earlier broadcasts conducted by the station's first owner, Vincent I. Kraft.

Beginning in 1917, Kraft was the director of the local Y.M.C.A. School of Radio Telegraphy. In early 1920, he and O. A. Dodson organized the Northwest Radio Service Company. Details on Kraft's earliest broadcasting efforts are limited. However, in August of that year he began an irregular series of broadcasts originating from his Cowen Park home at 5503 14th Avenue, N.E. His amateur station had the call sign 7AC. Later that year Kraft was issued a license for an Experimental station, with the call sign 7XC. In early September 1921 he began transmitting programs on a regular schedule, three evenings a week from 7:45-8:30 p.m.

In early February 1922, Kraft built a radio transmitter used by a temporary station, KDP, to broadcast a week-long series of programs from Saint James' Cathedral. Following these broadcasts he began using the KDP transmitter at 7XC. On February 28, 1922, he resigned his Y.M.C.A. post in order to assume active management of Northwest Radio.

=== KJR ===
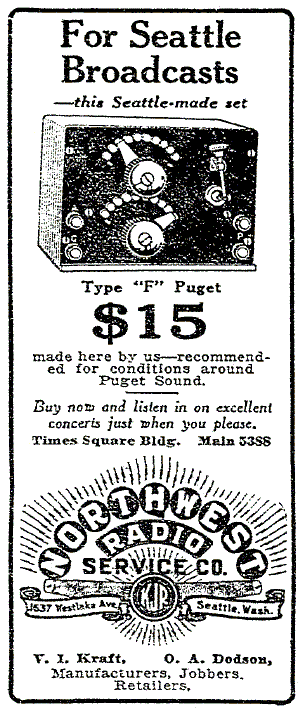
The Northwest Radio Service Company sold radio equipment in addition to founding KJR (1922)

Initially there were no specific standards for stations making broadcasts intended for the general public, and radio stations holding a variety of license classes, most commonly Experimental and Amateur, began adopting regular broadcasting schedules. On December 1, 1921, the U.S. Department of Commerce, which regulated radio at this time, adopted a regulation formally establishing a broadcasting station category, which set aside the wavelength of 360 meters (833 kHz) for entertainment broadcasts, and 485 meters (619 kHz) for market and weather reports.

A few months later Kraft applied for one of the new broadcasting licenses, which was issued on March 9, 1922, with the randomly assigned call letters KJR, for operation on both 360 and 485 meters. It had been initially reported that the station's new call sign was "KAJR", however this turned out to be an error in a telegram sent by the Commerce Department, and shortly thereafter it was correctly reported that the assignment was actually "KJR". Later in 1922 KJR's licensee was changed to "Northwest Radio Service Co. (Vincent I. Kraft)".

KJR was the third license issued for a Seattle broadcasting station, preceded by KFC (Northern Radio & Electric, licensed December 8, 1921, and deleted January 23, 1923) and KHQ (Louis Wasmer, licensed February 28, 1922, moved to Spokane in 1927–now KQNT). Despite this, KJR claims to have the oldest broadcasting lineage in Seattle by claiming 7XC as part of its history.

Because there was only the single entertainment wavelength of 360 meters available for use by multiple stations, each region had to set up a timesharing agreement to allocate timeslots. On June 23, 1922, three Seattle stations took turns operating from noon to 10:30 p.m., with KJR allocated 8:15 to 9:15 p.m. In May 1923 the Department of Commerce set aside an additional band of transmitting frequencies, and KJR was assigned to one of the lower power "Class A" frequencies, 1110 kHz, which was modified a short time later to 1060 kHz. In early 1925 the station transferred to one of the high power "Class B" frequencies, 780 kHz, and in 1927 the station was shifted again, to 860 kHz. On November 11, 1928, under the provisions of a major reallocation resulting from the Federal Radio Commission's (FRC) General Order 40, KJR was reassigned to a high-powered "clear channel" frequency of 970 kHz.

=== New studios and transmitter ===
KJR was originally located at the Times Square Building in downtown Seattle. In 1925, it moved to the Terminal Sales Building, where Kraft had erected a 50-foot (15 meter) mast to serve as the station's antenna, which was soon superseded by a new, T-wire antenna built in North City near Lake Forest Park completed in 1927 (later the site of Saint Mark's Catholic Church), at which point the studios were moved to the Home Savings Building at 1520 Westlake Ave.

Kraft sold the station to businessman Adolph Linden in 1928. KJR was planned to be the key station for a new radio network, the American Broadcasting Company (unrelated to the current ABC radio network), with plans for a nationwide expansion. However, the effort failed and Linden and a subsequent owner, Ahira Pierce, were jailed for illegal financing, using money from financial institutions which went bankrupt. KJR was then acquired by NBC, which in 1933 leased the station to the Fisher family-owned Fisher's Blend Station, Inc., owners of KOMO radio, who moved the KJR studios to the Skinner Building.

=== NBC Blue Network ===
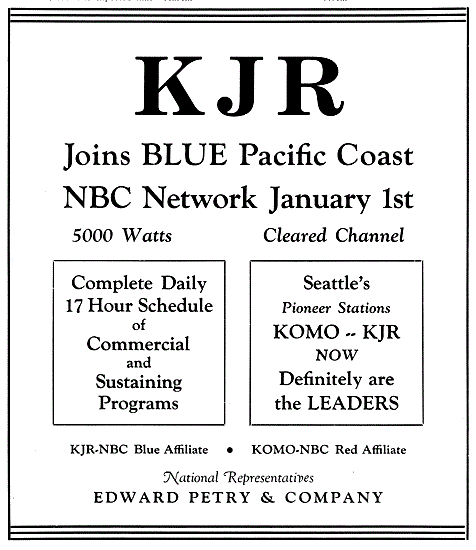
KJR joined the NBC Blue network on January 1, 1936.

In 1936, KJR became an affiliate of the NBC Blue Network. It aired its dramas, comedies, sports and newscasts. This affiliation continued after the Blue Network became ABC in the 1940s. In 1937, a new transmitter was erected on Seattle's West Waterway, which operated until 1996.

On March 29, 1941, KJR, along with the other stations on 970 kHz, moved to 1000 kHz, as part of the implementation of the North American Regional Broadcasting Agreement (NARBA). That same day the Fisher family, after leasing the station for eight years, purchased it outright.

At that time, KJR was powered at 5,000 watts but it had submitted a construction permit to go up to 50,000 watts. The studios were in the Skinner Building in Seattle.

=== Call letter swap between KJR and KOMO ===
The August 1941 adoption of the Federal Communications Commission's "duopoly" rule restricted licensees from operating more than one radio station in a given market. At this time the Fisher family owned two Seattle stations – KJR on 1000 kHz and KOMO on 950 kHz – and their efforts to be granted an exemption were unsuccessful. The Fishers decided to keep the superior frequency of 1000 kHz, but also keep the KOMO call letters that they had held since the 1920s. Thus, on May 6, 1944, KOMO and KJR swapped call letters, with the KJR call sign moving from 1000 kHz to the less desirable 950 kHz. The next year KJR was sold to Birt F. Fisher, who was unrelated to the KOMO owners.

In 1946, KJR was purchased by Marshall Field's Department Store chain. It continued its affiliation with ABC until 1953, when ABC affliliation switched to 1090 KING. In July 1952, Marshall Field sold the station to a group headed by Chicago businessman Ralph E. Stolkin, which sold it seven months later to two Portland businessmen, Theodore Gamble and Howard Lane.

=== Frank Sinatra ownership ===
KJR changed hands again, this time bought by Lester Smith in 1954. KJR became a pioneer Top 40 music station, continuing with this format until 1982. Smith moved the studios to the transmitter site on West Waterway in 1955. In 1957, the station was sold to entertainers Danny Kaye and Frank Sinatra, and Smith stayed on as general manager.

Sinatra sold his interest in the station to Smith in 1964, and the resulting partnership became known as "Kaye-Smith Enterprises". In the 1960s, under the programming guidance of Pat O'Day, the station was top rated in Seattle and well known for introducing the Pacific Northwest to many recording stars such as Jimi Hendrix, the Beatles, Merrilee Rush and the Ventures.

Competitors against KJR's top 40 format in the 1960s and 1970s included KOL 1300, KING 1090, and KIRO 710.

=== Metromedia ownership ===
KJR was sold to Metromedia in 1980. Metromedia was a New York-based media company with radio and television stations in many large cities in the U.S.

As youthful music moved to FM radio, KJR evolved its sound to adult contemporary in 1982, following in KING's footsteps. In 1984, Metromedia sold the station to Ackerley Communications for $6 million in cash. In June 1988, the station shifted to oldies, playing the music that had made the station famous throughout the 1960s and 1970s.

=== Sports radio ===
KJR's shift to sports programming was a gradual evolution starting in 1989, when the station added some sports-themed shows in middays and afternoons. The rest of the music programming was phased out in September 1991, making KJR a full-fledged sports radio station. The co-owned FM station at 95.7 MHz, which Ackerley had acquired (as KLTX) in December 1987, eventually switched its call sign to KJR-FM (now KJEB). KJR-FM broadcast a format that includes many of the songs and shows (including original American Top 40 shows from the 1970s) from KJR AM's heyday as a Top 40 powerhouse.

In July 1994, KJR and KJR-FM were sold to a partnership with New Century Management and Ackerley titled "New Century Media" (Ackerley would re-acquire full control of the two stations in February 1998). Clear Channel Communications (now iHeartMedia) bought the stations in May 2002.

=== FM simulcasts ===
On November 4, 2011, at 7 a.m., KJR began simulcasting on 102.9 FM, replacing country-formatted KNBQ. This ended on June 13, 2013, when KNBQ reverted to an adult top 40 music format as KYNW. During this time, Clear Channel did not transfer the KJR-FM call letters from 95.7 to 102.9, instead co-branding the station as "Sports Radio 950 AM and 102.9 FM KJR".

KJR's programming returned to FM on March 8, 2022, when KUBE (93.3 FM) began simulcasting the station. The simulcast lasted until April 11, at which point KJR shifted to all-syndicated programming from Fox Sports Radio and CBS Sports Radio, which was moved from KFNQ (1090 AM) as a result of that station's flip to all-conservative talk programming as "The Patriot".

== Notable DJs ==
KJR's listeners were entertained by some of the radio personalities: Larry Lujack, Scotty Brink, Norm Gregory, Magic Matt Alan, Burl Barer, Pat O'Day, Eric Chase, Bob Shannon, Dick Curtis, "World Famous" Tom Murphy, Ric Hansen, Bobby Simon, Jerry Kaye, Gary Shannon, Ichabod Caine, "Emperor" Lee Smith, Lan Roberts, Kevin O'Brien (Kevin Metheny), Robert O. Smith, Charlie Brown, Bwana Johnny, Matt Riedy, Marion Seymour, Marty Riemer, Sky Walker, Tracy Mitchell, Tom Watson PD mid-1980's, Bob Brooks, Tony Marcus, Joe "Copper" Cooper, Janet Wilson and sports commentator Chuck Bolland, plus Bolland's much younger brother Mark "Jeffries" Bolland. Gary "Lockjock" Lockwood, a.k.a. L.J., was the air personality who had the longest tenure on the "Mighty Channel 95", from 1976 to 1991.

== Sports teams ==
KJR served as the home of the Seattle SuperSonics from 1987 to 2006.

Since the 2006-2007 season, ISP Sports was the media rights holder for Husky athletics until IMG College took over. KJR was the Washington IMG College Network's flagship station from 2002 to 2014. (KJR has since lost the broadcast rights back to KOMO.)

KJR carried some play-by-play from ESPN Radio, and some of the regular talk shows at night and during weekends.

In 2002, Seattle Mariners relief pitcher Jeff Nelson had surgery to remove bone chips from his pitching elbow. During his weekly show with Dave "Softy" Mahler, Nelson announced he would attempt to sell his bone chips on eBay. After earning bids as high as $23,600, eBay pulled the chips from auction for violating the site's policy of not selling body parts.

In 2003, Seattle Storm point guard Sue Bird made a bet with morning host Mitch Levy that gained national publicity. The bet was over Bird's season assist/turnover ratio. If the ratio finished higher that 3:1, Bird agreed to be spanked by Levy on the air. If Bird won the bet, Levy agreed to purchase Storm season tickets. The bet was later amended to include Bird yelling "Harder, Daddy, Harder". The bet was ultimately called off by Bird. When asked at a later date, Tyler Orsborn (morning show producer at the time) suggested that Storm management were the real reason the bet was called off and not Bird.

During a 2006 radio interview with Dave "Softy" Mahler and former University of Washington quarterback Hugh Millen, then-Atlanta Falcons head coach Jim L. Mora said he'd be in the "friggin' head of the line" for the Washington Huskies football head coaching position, if it became available. Mora, who played for the University of Washington, later said he was only kidding during the interview, but was still fired by the Falcons at the end of the season. He would later coach the Seattle Seahawks for one season in 2009.

Host "Softy" began a feud with another sports show host in Salt Lake City, Utah after they argued about their predicted outcomes of the Washington vs. BYU game on September 5, 2008. After arguing with Hans Olsen of Sports Radio 1280 The Zone, Softy had an on-air meltdown where he claimed that he was going to choke Hans and repeatedly called him an idiot.

On August 26, 2017, KJR morning host Mitch Levy was arrested in connection with a prostitution sting. iHeartMedia has not issued a public statement on the matter. On October 6, Levy announced he would exit from the station after 23 years.

As of the 2018 Major League Soccer season, KJR is the English-speaking broadcast partner for Seattle Sounders FC with Matt Johnson on the call.

On March 3, 2021, the National Hockey League expansion team, the Seattle Kraken, announced a multi-year broadcast agreement with iHeart; as part of the deal, KJR serves as the broadcast home of the team, with some games simulcast on KJAQ. The deal also includes a promotional partnership with the entire iHeart Seattle cluster and the 80+ concerts and events to be held annually at Climate Pledge Arena.

== See also ==
- List of initial AM-band station grants in the United States
- List of three-letter broadcast call signs in the United States
