= KNDD =

Alternative rock radio station in Seattle

- Seattle, Washington; United States
- Broadcast area: Seattle metro area, Puget Sound
- Frequency: 107.7 MHz (HD Radio)
- Branding: 107.7 The End

Programming
- Language: English
- Format: Alternative rock
- Subchannels: HD2: Channel Q

Ownership
- Owner: Audacy, Inc.; (Audacy License, LLC)
- Sister stations: KHTP; KISW; KKWF; KSWD

History
- First air date: September 15, 1962; 64 years ago
- Former call signs: KRAB (1962–85); KMGI (1985–91)
- Call sign meaning: "The End"

Technical information
- Licensing authority: FCC
- Facility ID: 34530
- Class: C
- ERP: 68,000 watts
- HAAT: 707 meters (2,320 ft)
- Transmitter coordinates: 47.503722°N 121.975944°W
- Translator: HD2: 103.3 K277AE (Seattle)

Links
- Public license information: Public file; LMS
- Webcast: Listen live (via Audacy)
- Website: www.audacy.com/1077theend

KNDD (107.7 FM, "107.7 The End") is a commercial radio station in Seattle, Washington. It is owned by Audacy, Inc. and airs an alternative rock radio format. Its studios are located on Fifth Avenue in Downtown Seattle. The station broadcasts with an effective radiated power (ERP) of 68,000 watts. It transmits from a tower 707 meters (2,320 ft) in height above average terrain (HAAT) near Issaquah, Washington, on Tiger Mountain.

KNDD broadcasts in HD. Its HD2 subchannel airs an LGBTQ Talk/EDM format known as Channel Q, which also feeds a 250-watt FM translator in Seattle, 103.3 K277AE.

== History ==
=== Non-Commercial KRAB ===
The station first signed on the air on September 15, 1962, as non-commercial KRAB. It was founded by Lorenzo Milam and eventually owned by the Jack Straw Memorial Foundation. The station’s effective radiated power was 20,000 watts. KRAB broadcast an eclectic mix of Pacifica radio features, world music, jazz, and much more. But the station was also dangerously close to insolvency.

Its management realized the station could be sold to a commercial broadcaster and an endowment created, allowing the foundation to broadcast in the non-commercial part of the radio dial, which exists between 88.1 MHz and 91.9 MHz. The owners of KRAB originally applied to share time with KNHC, owned by the Seattle Public Schools. However, the school district did not want to give up air time. Ultimately, the foundation got a license for 90.7 MHz in Everett, Washington. KRAB's legacy remains on the air at KSER. In April 1984, after Sunbelt Communications bought KRAB, the 107.7 FM frequency went dark for the next 11 months.

=== KMGI ===
The first commercial station on 107.7 signed on March 9, 1985. It played oldies-based soft adult contemporary music and was known as KMGI, "Magic 108." The station had limited success for four years under the format; under the ownership of the Noble Broadcast Group, in August 1989, KMGI would refocus as a Hot AC station and rebranded as "I-107.7."

KMGI brought together the morning team of Kelly Stevens and Alpha Trivette, who remained with the station throughout its days as "I-107.7". All forms of AC tried on the station resulted in low ratings.

=== "The End" debuts ===
At 3 p.m., on August 16, 1991, KMGI began stunting with TV theme songs, and had different voices stating "The End is coming" between some songs and during its commercial breaks. A week later, on August 23, at 3 p.m., the station flipped to modern rock, and changed its name and call letters to "107-7 The End", KNDD. The End's first songs were "It's The End of The World As We Know It (And I Feel Fine)" by R.E.M., followed by "Sex (I'm a ...)" by Berlin. The station initially went by the slogan "The Cutting Edge of Rock." This positioning statement borrowed directly from its San Diego/Tijuana sister station XETRA-FM. It was the Seattle market's fourth attempt at a modern alternative format, dating back to KZAM AM 1540 in the late 1970s (now KXPA). Other stations in the format at one time or another included KJET AM 1590 and KYYX FM 96.5, which both trace their histories to the 1980s.

Within six weeks of The End's first broadcast, three albums by local artists — Ten by Pearl Jam, Nevermind by Nirvana and Badmotorfinger by Soundgarden — were released. These albums helped come to define the sound known as grunge, and the station quickly became one of the leaders in alternative rock radio. KNDD was also the first commercial station to play the band Weezer, when in June 1994, the station added "Undone (The Sweater Song)" to its playlist.

Noble traded KNDD to Viacom in exchange for KHOW-AM-FM in Denver in December 1992. Entercom acquired the station in 1996. Entercom rebranded as Audacy in March 2021.

In 1998, MTV's The Real World was taped in Seattle and required the season's cast to work at KNDD as "modulators".

=== Alternative rivals ===
On December 18, 2003, the station moved to a classic alternative rock direction. CBS Radio followed suit 29 hours later by flipping KYPT ("96.5 The Point") to KRQI ("96-5 K-Rock") to provide competition. Shortly after KRQI's sign-on, KNDD moved back to a current-based direction, although it dumped most hard rock bands. KRQI only remained as an alternative rock station for two years, flipping to adult hits in 2005 as KJAQ.

In 2011, Sandusky's KLCK-FM changed formats from adult album alternative/modern AC to alternative rock. The rivalry lasted only a year, as KLCK shifted to hot adult contemporary in March 2012.

=== Program Director and Morning show changes ===
For many years, the station's morning show was titled "The Morning End", and was hosted by Andy Savage. Savage was let go in 2003 when his contract expired. After a period of music-based shows, The Adam Carolla Show, syndicated from Los Angeles, began airing in morning drive time in 2006.

In May 2006, long time program director Phil Manning announced that he was leaving the station. Scott Geiger, also known as Lazlo, of sister station KRBZ in Kansas City, was named the new program director on June 1, 2006. In November 2006, he began hosting afternoons with a simulcast of his KRBZ show, which was co-hosted by his then-wife Afentra Bandokoudis, under "The Church of Lazlo" moniker.

In June 2008, KNDD announced that Mike Kaplan would be replacing Geiger as program director. Kaplan had previously served as operations manager for two of Entercom's stations in New Orleans. KNDD also announced that Geiger would stay on as a DJ, and continue to host his afternoon show "The Church of Lazlo." On July 17, Lazlo and Afentra announced that they would depart KNDD. On August 25, both "Afentra's Big Fat Morning Buzz" and "The Church of Lazlo" returned to Kansas City on KRBZ.

In February 2009, the syndicated Adam Carolla Show was cancelled, leaving KNDD without a morning show. After an on-air search for a new morning host that featured well known DJs and local musicians, Whitney "Red" Knoerlein was named host of a freshly resurrected version of The Morning End. The current wake-up host is Gregr.

In April 2013, program director Mike Kaplan, who became Program Director at alternative rock station KYSR in Los Angeles, was replaced by Garett Michaels. Michaels was replaced by Leslie Scott, who lasted until 2024. Christine Malovetz currently oversees the station, along with other Audacy alternative stations from offices in New York City.

In September 2020, Entercom made sweeping changes at its alternative stations across the country in response to revenue declines related to the COVID-19 pandemic. All of KNDD's DJs were laid off except for morning host Gregr, who would now be heard on other Entercom stations as well. The replacement DJs were voice tracked from other markets. The music at KNDD and Entercom's other alternative stations would drastically shift toward pop and TikTok artists at this time under the direction of former KNDD program director Mike Kaplan. This move was a failure and the stations would shift back toward alternative rock within a couple of years. In 2023, the station brought back its Locals Only Sunday night local music show.

=== Awards ===
In 2007, the station was nominated for the "Alternative Station of the Year" award by Radio & Records magazine. Other nominees included WBCN in Boston; KROQ-FM in Los Angeles; KTBZ-FM in Houston; KITS in San Francisco; and WWDC in Washington, D.C.

=== KNDD-HD2 Channel Q ===
In January 2019, KNDD's HD2 subchannel flipped from an all-Pacific Northwest bands and artists format to Entercom's "Channel Q," a talk and EDM network aimed at the LGBTQ community.

Channel Q also airs on Entercom HD subchannels in Los Angeles, San Francisco, Phoenix, Sacramento and Houston. Hosts include Jai Rodriguez, John Duran, Julie Goldman and Shira Lazar. Channel Q is also heard on an FM translator in Downtown Seattle, 103.3 K277AE, which formerly relayed co-owned KHTP.

==== HD2 translator ====
Call sign	Frequency	City of license	FID	ERP (W)	HAAT	Class	Transmitter coordinates	FCC info
K277AE	103.3 FM	Seattle, Washington	18522	250	191 m (627 ft)	D	47°36′20.3″N 122°19′50.4″W	LMS

== Current DJs ==
- Gregr
- Christy Taylor (voice-tracked)
- Ian Camfield (voice-tracked from Dallas, Texas)
- Kevan Kenney (voice-tracked from Los Angeles)
- Steven Graham, host of Locals Only

== Former DJs ==
- Marco Collins
- harms
- Cody Von Whistler
- Andy Savage
- Bill Reid
- DJ No Name
- Walter Flakus
- Steve Migs
- Jordan Silver
- Tony Morigi (1994-2000)
- Lazlo
- Pepper
- Whitney "Red" Knoerlein
- Bryce Segall
- 'Alyssa Page' Boccuzzi
- Joe ‘Brady’ Blum (voice tracked from New York)
- Dallas Osborn (voice tracked from San Francisco)
- Nicole Alvarez (voice tracked from Los Angeles)
- Kevan Kenney (voice tracked from Los Angeles)
- Megan Holiday (voice tracked from Los Angeles)

== Discontinued Programs ==
- Loveline
- The Andy Savage Show
- The Adam Carolla Show
- The Church of Lazlo: Afternoon drive show hosted by Lazlo, wife Afentra, and sidekick Slimfast
