= KARR (AM) =

Coordinates: 47°40′23″N 122°10′08″W

- Kirkland, Washington; United States
- Broadcast area: Seattle metropolitan area
- Frequency: 1460 kHz

Ownership
- Owner: James A. Dalke

History
- First air date: May 1964
- Last air date: May 2023
- Former call signs: KYAC (1964–1975); KILO (1975–1977); KGAA (1977-1984)

Technical information
- Licensing authority: FCC
- Facility ID: 20669
- Class: B
- Power: 5,000 watts daytime; 2,500 watts nighttime

Links
- Public license information: Public file; LMS
- Webcast: Listen live
- Website: familyradio.org

KARR (1460 kHz) was an AM radio station licensed to Kirkland, Washington, United States. It broadcast to the Seattle metropolitan area and was last owned by James A. Dalke.

KARR used a directional antenna at all times, broadcasting at 5,000 watts by day and 2,500 watts at night. Its transmitter was off 127th Place NE in Kirkland.

== History ==
The 1460 frequency in the Seattle area first was used by KYAC, which signed on in 1964. It was owned by Carl-Dek, Inc. and aired a country music format, and would later flip to an R&B format. The station was a daytimer, broadcasting at 5,000 watts but required to go off the air at sunset to avoid interfering with other stations on AM 1460. In 1975, KYAC moved to 1250 AM, taking over the dial position of KTW.

Also in 1975, a new station signed on at AM 1460. KILO aired an album rock format. In 1977, it became KGAA, a country music station owned by Monroe Broadcasting, a Spokane-based company that also owned that city's country station, KGA.

In 1979, KGAA flipped to an MOR format. The station was sold that year to Community Communications of Gresham, Oregon. In 1983, the station was granted the right to broadcast full-time by the Federal Communications Commission (FCC).

The station changed its call sign to KARR in 1984, and flipped to an adult standards format, utilizing the "Music of Your Life" network feed.

In 1985, KARR went dark due to financial problems. The following September, KARR returned to the air as an affiliate of Family Radio, and would be owned Family Radio itself.

On February 12, 2014, Family Radio announced that KARR would suspend operations on 28 February due to the expiration of the lease at its transmitter location. KARR returned to the air with reduced power from a temporary transmitter site on 23 February 2015.

Effective August 6, 2015, the station was sold to James A. Dalke, for a price of $3,000. Dalke continued to operate KARR with oldies programming, restoring it to 250 watts.

The station left the air in May 2023 and never returned. The Federal Communications Commission cancelled the station’s license on August 8, 2024.
