= Lake Boren =

Lake in Newcastle, Washington

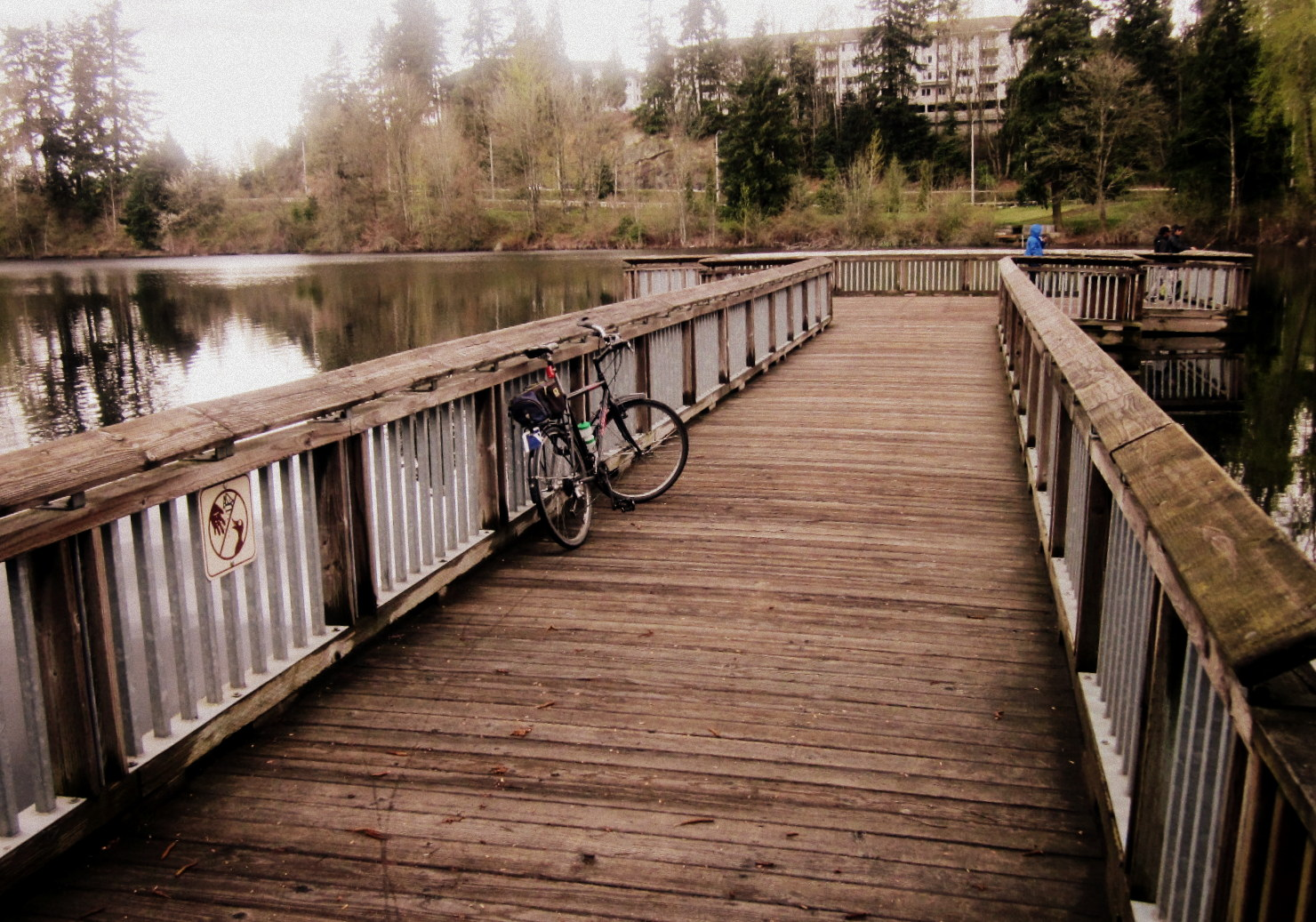
- Lake Boren viewed from the fishing dock

- Location within Washington (state) Location within the United States
- Location: Newcastle, Washington
- Coordinates: 47.532707°N 122.165249°W
- Primary inflows: China Creek
- Primary outflows: Boren Creek
- Basin countries: United States
- Surface area: 16.20 acres (6.56 ha)
- Max. depth: 34 ft (10 m)
- Surface elevation: 387 ft (118 m)

Lake Boren is located just south of downtown Newcastle, Washington. Lake Boren Park is located on its southwestern shore.

== History ==
Lake Boren, once named Etta Cartney Lake, was once much larger and deeper than it is now, with a depth of 90 feet (27 m) in 1883. It is fed by China Creek, which originates on Cougar Mountain. The creek was named for Chinese coal miners, who had racial confrontations with white miners. The lake overflowed onto a floodplain during the winter, which was used for grazing livestock during the summer. Before 1950, the lake had salmon runs that migrated from Lake Washington.

Sediment from China Creek reduced the depth of the lake to 34 feet (10 m). The creek was channelized in the 1960s, stopping flooding and allowing for development near the lake. A culvert mostly stopped salmon migration in the 1950s.

== Description ==
Lake Boren Park has many amenities, including a fishing dock, tennis courts, a basketball court, a sand volleyball court, a play area and picnic shelters. It is home to community events, such as concerts, Fourth of July fireworks, and Newcastle Days.

There are many hiking trails near Lake Boren. The Waterline trail travels just to the west of Lake Boren Park, connecting it to the May Creek Trail and downtown Newcastle. The CrossTown trail runs east from Lake Boren Park, connecting to the large trail network of Cougar Mountain Regional Wildland Park

The lake is popular for fishing. It has been stocked with rainbow trout by the Washington Department of Fish and Wildlife since the salmon run was cut off. Other fish species in the lake include brown bullhead, coastal cutthroat trout, largemouth bass, and yellow perch.

Lake Boren has 660 acres (270 ha) of watershed area. It is a mesotrophic lake.
