= Cougar Mountain Zoo =

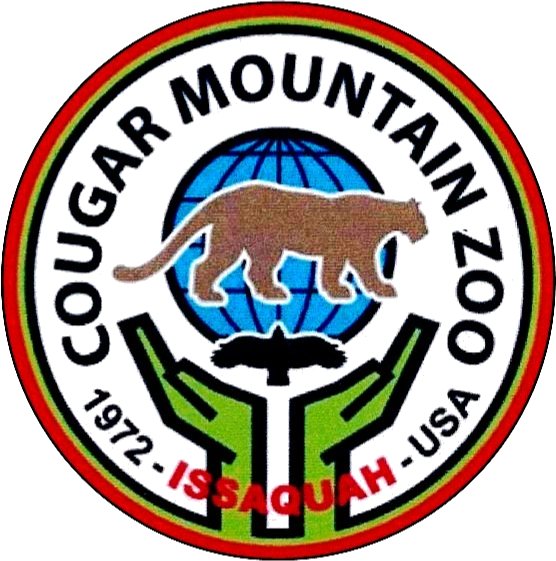
- Cougar Mountain Zoo logo

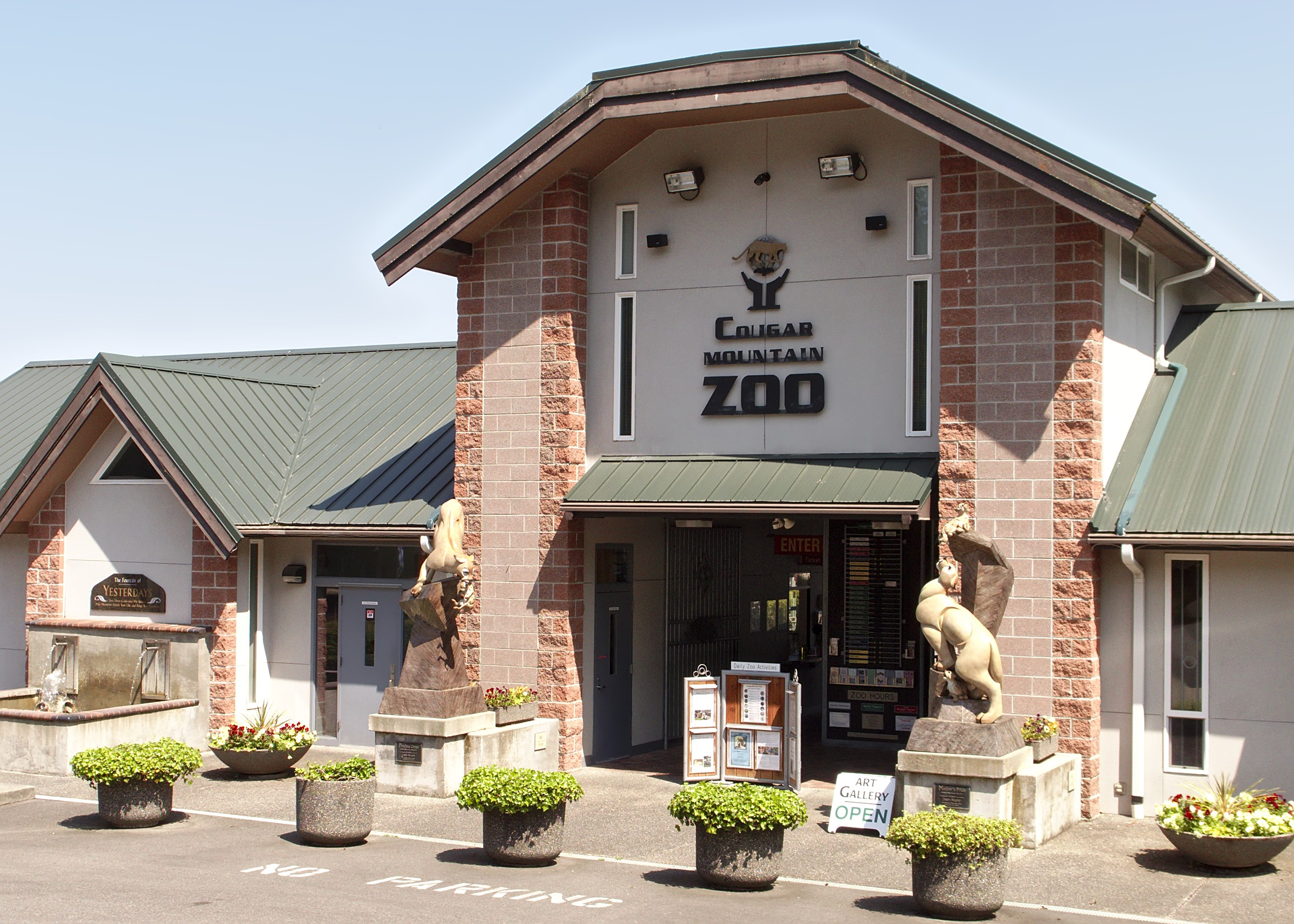
- Interactive map of Cougar Mountain Zoo
- 47.55299°N 122.08069°W
- Date opened: 1972
- Location: Cougar Mountain, Issaquah, Washington, U.S.
- Land area: 11 acres (4.5 ha)
- Memberships: ZAA, AAZK, ZSW
- Website: http://www.cougarmountainzoo.org

Cougar Mountain Zoo is an 11-acre (4.5 ha) non-profit zoological park located in Issaquah, Washington, on the north slope of Cougar Mountain about 15 miles (24 km) east of Seattle. It is located near the border of the Cougar Mountain Regional Wildland Park. The zoo focuses on endangered species including lemurs from Madagascar, Bengal tigers, and endangered birds from various parts of the world. It was founded in 1972 by Peter and Marcie Rittler who operated it admission-free for its first 15 years. In 1990, the founders donated it to the Zoological Society of Washington which assumed the zoo's management and fundraising endeavors. As of 2009, Peter Rittler continued in the zoo's management.

== Exhibits ==
The zoo collection features exhibits concentrating on endangered species such as tigers, lemurs, wolves, reindeer, cranes, wallabies, macaws, and cougars, among others. On June 16, 2007, the zoo acquired two male Bengal tiger cubs, a royal white and a golden, who were born eight weeks apart in a Florida tiger preserve. The zoo added an additional two cubs in 2009. A glass-walled tunnel called the "Tiger Tunnel" enables visitors to view tigers in close proximity. In 2011, a 370-pound (168 km) tiger was photographed holding his paw up to the glass wall to meet the hand of a small child, appearing to play patty-cake, resulting in a picture which was picked up by news services.

In 2016, a pack of four male gray wolves was acquired.

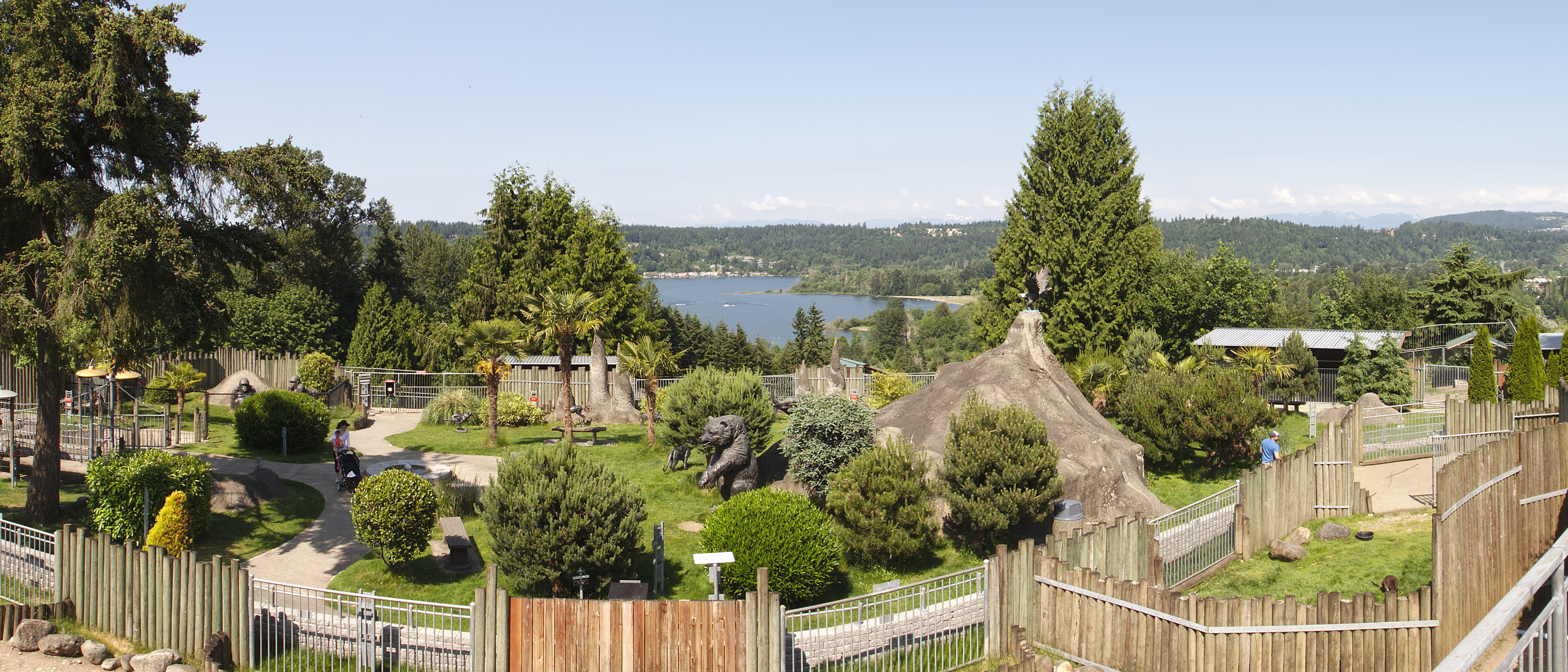
View of Lake Sammamish from the zoo

== Education programs ==
Zoo lectures, presentations and demonstrations are held throughout the day and docents are on-site to answer visitors' questions. A fee-based membership program called "The Living Classroom" is available to serve all children or youth groups including preschool children and for school grades K through 12, to teach them about wildlife. The zoo features outreach programs to churches, and to senior citizens groups.

== Ancillary features ==
- Bronze Collection, featuring bronze animal sculptures which are displayed throughout the zoo.
- Wildlife Tracks Library, to aid in identifying an animal by its tracks.
- Wildlife Museum, with wildlife paraphernalia used for teaching, consisting of specimens donated by private individuals.
- Magnani Nature Gallery, an art gallery located on zoo property. Established in 1989, it features nature art in various forms, with a permanent exhibit, and art for purchase. It is a for-profit endeavor, but contributes annually to zoological education programs.
