= Newcastle, Washington =

City in Washington, United States

- City
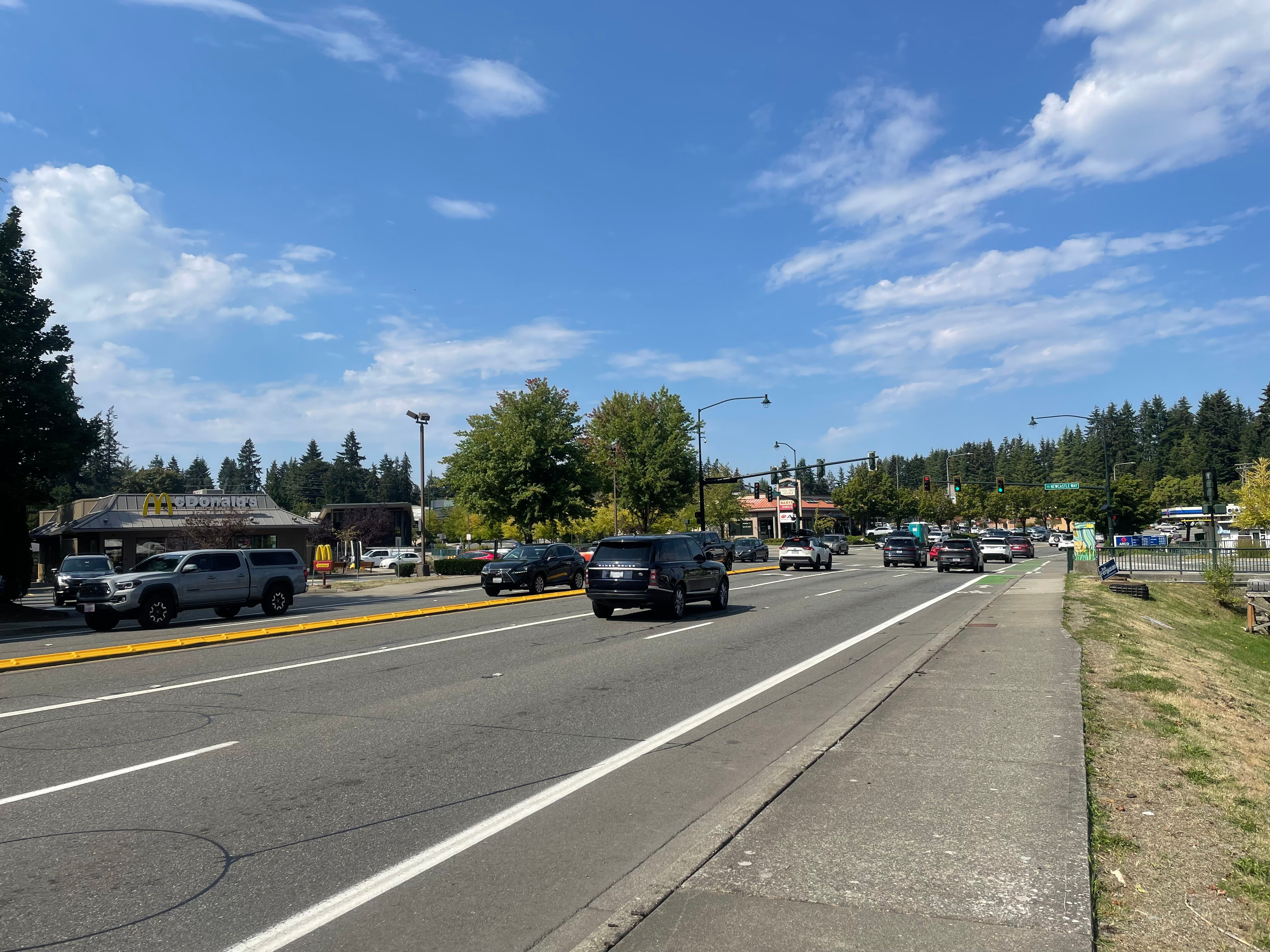
- Intersection between Coal Creek Parkway and Newcastle Way, looking northwest towards Bellevue

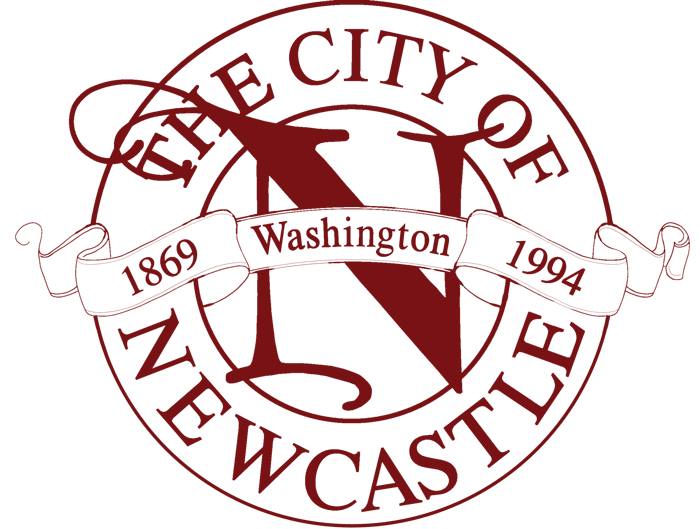
- Seal

- Location of Newcastle, Washington
- Coordinates: 47°31′49″N 122°09′48″W
- Country: United States
- State: Washington
- County: King
- Founded: 1869
- Incorporated: September 30, 1994

Government
  - Type: Council–manager
  - Mayor: Ariana Sherlock
  - City manager: Scott Pingel

Area
  - Total: 4.46 sq mi (11.55 km^{2})
  - Land: 4.44 sq mi (11.49 km^{2})
  - Water: 0.023 sq mi (0.06 km^{2})
- Elevation: 381 ft (116 m)

Population (2020)
  - Total: 13,017
  - Estimate (2023): 12,761
  - Density: 2,877.5/sq mi (1,111.01/km^{2})
- Time zone: UTC−8 (Pacific (PST))
  - Summer (DST): UTC−7 (PDT)
- ZIP Codes: 98056, 98059
- Area code: 425
- FIPS code: 53-48645
- GNIS feature ID: 2411243
- Website: newcastlewa.gov

Newcastle is an Eastside city in King County, Washington, United States. The population was 13,017 at the 2020 census.

Although Newcastle was not incorporated until 1994, it has been an important settlement and town since the late 19th century and played a major role in the development of Seattle and the surrounding region. Newcastle was one of the region's first coal mining areas and its railroad link to Seattle was the first in King County. Timber also played a role in the early history of Newcastle. Coal delivered by rail from Newcastle's mines to Seattle fueled the growth of the Port of Seattle and attracted railroads, most notably the Great Northern Railway.

The Newcastle coal mine began producing coal by the 1870s. More than 13 million tons of coal had been extracted by the time the mine closed in 1963. The history of Newcastle's coal mining industry and the legacy of the mines' many Chinese laborers are memorialized in place names such as Coal Creek, Coal Creek Parkway, and the Coal Creek and China Creek golf courses.

Based on per capita income, Newcastle ranks 13th of 522 areas in the state of Washington to be ranked. In CNN Money's 2011 rankings of best places to live in the United States, Newcastle was in the top 20, along with nearby Sammamish. It ranked 17th in Newsweek's 2009 rankings of best places to live in the United States.

== History ==
Coal was discovered along Coal Creek in 1863 by surveyors Philip H. Lewis and Edwin Richardson, who had been working in the area for the United States General Land Office. Newcastle was named for the idiom "Coals to Newcastle" by a party of coal surveyors in 1869 according to F. H. Whitworth, who was part of the party. One of them suggested the name "New Castle" which was subsequently adopted by all parties of interest. The idiom itself refers to the English city of Newcastle upon Tyne.

Newcastle (originally spelled "New Castle") as a village was properly established by the 1870s, though the official date given for the founding of the town is 1869, as seen on the seal for the City of Newcastle. By 1872, 75–100 tons of coal per day were being produced at Newcastle. About 60 men worked at the mines. The Seattle and Walla Walla Railroad, the first railroad in King County, reached Newcastle from Seattle in 1878. Coal mining ended in 1963.

The area was an unincorporated area within King County until it incorporated as a city on September 30, 1994. Currently the city is a suburban community. Based on Newcastle's location north of Renton, south of Bellevue, and across Lake Washington from Seattle, these are the communities in which most of the residents of Newcastle work. East of southeast Lake Washington is a large quantity of hilly terrain, which creates opportunities for view properties. This created the impetus for the location of the Newcastle Golf Course, along with many high-value homes at higher elevations with views of downtown Bellevue, Seattle, and Mercer Island, as well as the Olympic Mountains. Notable attractions of the area include the Golf Club at Newcastle, a brand new Family YMCA, Lake Boren Park, a well developed trail system, and nearby Cougar Mountain in the east of Newcastle.

=== Newcastle and Newport Hills ===
The community was not always known as Newcastle. When suburban development came in the 1960s, the old mining town of Newcastle was long gone and all but forgotten. The area then became known as Newport Hills.

In the early 1990s there was a movement to incorporate as a new city. But some members of the community objected—some believed that the new city would be too small to be viable, while others feared that the city council would be in the pocket of the hilltop golf course. In 1993, five parcels of Newport Hills each voted to annex themselves into Bellevue. Those 5 parcels comprised nearly half the population of the community. They became the Newport Hills neighborhood of Bellevue. When Newport Hills incorporated as a new city the following year, their first order of business was to choose a new name, since it would now be confusing to have a city of Newport Hills adjacent to the Newport Hills neighborhood of Bellevue. Residents voted on Cougar Mountain and Newcastle and chose the latter.

== Newcastle trails ==
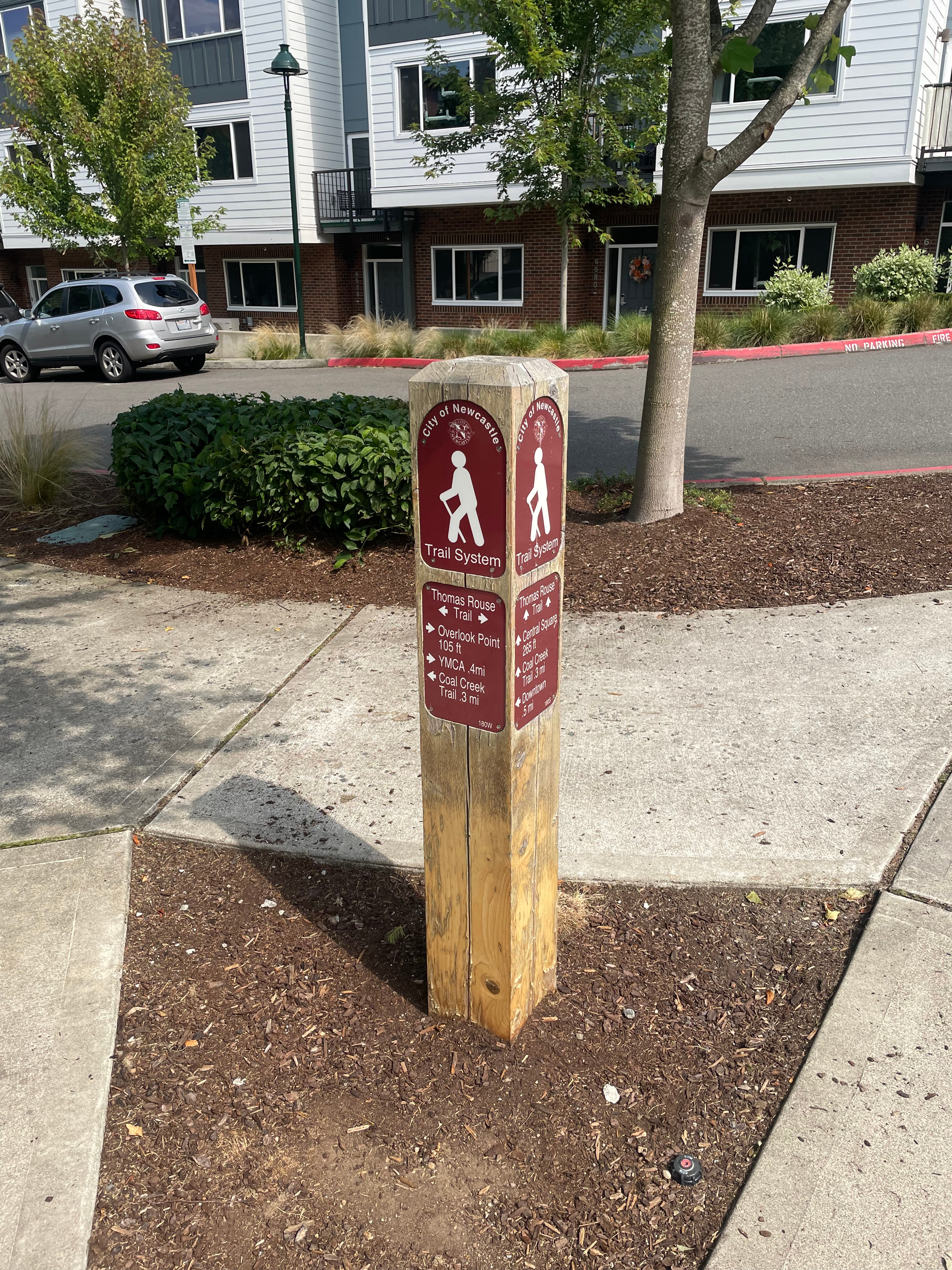
Trail marker in Newcastle Commons, along the Thomas Rouse Trail

The city has an active trail-building community, creating a system of trails that are being integrated into new housing developments and parks. Most of the trail-work has been completed by volunteers and the Washington Conservation Corps, sponsored by the city of Newcastle. The trail system will eventually lead all the way to Lake Washington to the west, in conjunction with Renton, and is already connected to Cougar Mountain Regional Wildland Park to the east, which is in unincorporated King County.

== ZIP codes ==
The city has not obtained its own ZIP code even though, based on the ZIP code designation, some sales taxes paid by Newcastle residents go to Renton instead of Newcastle as tax revenues (among other perceived detrimental impacts related to mail service, insurance rates, property values, and credit ratings).

== Geography ==
Coal Creek flows through the city from the Issaquah Alps to Lake Washington. Lake Boren is located near downtown.

Newcastle is bordered to the north by Bellevue, to the south by Renton, to the east by unincorporated land on Cougar Mountain, and to the west by Lake Washington.

According to the United States Census Bureau, the city has a total area of 4.460 square miles (11.55 km^{2}), of which 4.435 square miles (11.49 km^{2}) is land and 0.125 square miles (0.32 km^{2}) is water.

=== Climate ===
Climate data for Newcastle, Washington
Month	Jan	Feb	Mar	Apr	May	Jun	Jul	Aug	Sep	Oct	Nov	Dec	Year
Record high °F (°C)	64 (18)	71 (22)	81 (27)	86 (30)	93 (34)	100 (38)	104 (40)	99 (37)	96 (36)	86 (30)	78 (26)	69 (21)	104 (40)
Mean daily maximum °F (°C)	48 (9)	51 (11)	56 (13)	61 (16)	67 (19)	72 (22)	78 (26)	78 (26)	72 (22)	62 (17)	52 (11)	46 (8)	62 (17)
Mean daily minimum °F (°C)	36 (2)	36 (2)	39 (4)	42 (6)	48 (9)	53 (12)	56 (13)	56 (13)	51 (11)	45 (7)	39 (4)	35 (2)	45 (7)
Record low °F (°C)	−10 (−23)	−5 (−21)	10 (−12)	25 (−4)	27 (−3)	33 (1)	38 (3)	34 (1)	28 (−2)	24 (−4)	−1 (−18)	3 (−16)	−10 (−23)
Average precipitation inches (mm)	4.8 (120)	3.4 (86)	3.5 (89)	2.8 (71)	2.2 (56)	1.6 (41)	0.8 (20)	1.0 (25)	1.5 (38)	3.4 (86)	5.8 (150)	5.4 (140)	36.2 (920)
Source: Weather.com

== Schools ==
Newcastle is served by two school districts, with the boundary line roughly going north–south just to the west of Coal Creek Parkway. The three "in-city" schools are Newcastle Elementary, which is operated by the Issaquah School District 411 and Hazelwood Elementary next to Risdon Middle School which are operated by Renton School District 403.

District: Issaquah School District No. 411

Schools: Newcastle Elementary School, Cougar Mountain Middle School and Liberty High School

Neighborhoods: The Highlands at Newcastle, East Olympus, Mile Post, Lake Boren, The Trails at Newcastle, China Creek, China Falls, The Reserve at Newcastle

District: Renton School District No. 403

Schools: Hazelwood Elementary School, Risdon Middle School, Hazen High School

Neighborhoods: Lake Washington Ridge, West Olympus, Hazelwood, Newport Woods, Newport Hills

== Demographics ==
Historical population
Census	Pop.	Note	%±
1980	12,245		—
1990	14,736		20.3%
2000	7,737		−47.5%
2010	10,380		34.2%
2020	13,017		25.4%
2023 (est.)	12,761		−2.0%
Source: U.S. Decennial Census; 2020 Census

Although the present-day African American population of Newcastle is small, in the 1880s when it was a mining center, Newcastle had the Puget Sound area's largest African American population, greater even than that of Seattle.

=== Racial and ethnic composition ===
Newcastle, Washington – racial and ethnic composition Note: the US Census treats Hispanic/Latino as an ethnic category. This table excludes Latinos from the racial categories and assigns them to a separate category. Hispanics/Latinos may be of any race.
Race / ethnicity (NH = non-Hispanic)	Pop. 2000	Pop. 2010	Pop. 2020	% 2000	% 2010	% 2020
White alone (NH)	5,700	6,551	6,307	73.67%	63.11%	48.45%
Black or African American alone (NH)	121	259	444	1.56%	2.50%	3.41%
Native American or Alaska Native alone (NH)	34	34	23	0.44%	0.33%	0.18%
Asian alone (NH)	1,402	2,549	4,513	18.12%	24.56%	34.67%
Pacific Islander alone (NH)	19	32	20	0.25%	0.31%	0.15%
Other race alone (NH)	23	31	68	0.30%	0.30%	0.52%
Mixed race or multiracial (NH)	215	484	895	2.78%	4.66%	6.88%
Hispanic or Latino (any race)	223	440	747	2.88%	4.24%	5.74%
Total	7,737	10,380	13,017	100.00%	100.00%	100.00%

=== 2020 census ===
As of the 2020 census, there were 13,017 people, 5,132 households, and 3,631 families residing in the city. The population density was 2,925.8 inhabitants per square mile (1,129.7/km^{2}). The gender makeup of the city was 50.0% female.

There were 5,132 households in Newcastle, of which 34.0% had children under the age of 18 living in them. Of all households, 59.1% were married-couple households, 14.8% were households with a male householder and no spouse or partner present, and 20.4% were households with a female householder and no spouse or partner present. About 22.0% of all households were made up of individuals and 7.0% had someone living alone who was 65 years of age or older.

There were 5,471 housing units at an average density of 1,229.7 per square mile (474.8/km^{2}), of which 6.2% were vacant. The homeowner vacancy rate was 0.7% and the rental vacancy rate was 11.5%.

The median age was 38.9 years. 21.6% of residents were under the age of 18, 7.0% were under 5 years of age, and 13.9% were 65 years of age or older. For every 100 females there were 96.6 males, and for every 100 females age 18 and over there were 95.1 males.

100.0% of residents lived in urban areas, while 0.0% lived in rural areas.

The racial makeup of the city was 49.60% White, 3.41% African American, 0.32% Native American, 34.82% Asian, 0.21% Pacific Islander, 1.99% from some other races and 9.65% from two or more races. Hispanic or Latino people of any race were 5.74% of the population.

Racial composition as of the 2020 census
Race	Number	Percent
White	6,456	49.6%
Black or African American	444	3.4%
American Indian and Alaska Native	42	0.3%
Asian	4,533	34.8%
Native Hawaiian and Other Pacific Islander	27	0.2%
Some other race	259	2.0%
Two or more races	1,256	9.6%
Hispanic or Latino (of any race)	747	5.7%

=== 2010 census ===
As of the 2010 census, there were 10,380 people, 4,021 households, and 2,860 families residing in the city. The population density was 2,334.1 inhabitants per square mile (901.2/km^{2}). There were 4,227 housing units at an average density of 949.9 per square mile (366.8/km^{2}). The racial makeup of the city was 65.36% White, 2.60% African American, 0.37% Native American, 24.67% Asian, 0.33% Pacific Islander, 1.63% from some other races and 5.05% from two or more races. Hispanic or Latino people of any race were 4.24% of the population.

There were 4,021 households, of which 35.3% had children under the age of 18 living with them, 61.6% were married couples living together, 6.2% had a female householder with no husband present, 3.3% had a male householder with no wife present, and 28.9% were non-families. 21.8% of all households were made up of individuals, and 4.4% had someone living alone who was 65 years of age or older. The average household size was 2.57 and the average family size was 3.04.

The median age in the city was 38.7 years. 23.7% of residents were under the age of 18; 6.6% were between the ages of 18 and 24; 31.1% were from 25 to 44; 29.7% were from 45 to 64; and 9% were 65 years of age or older. The gender makeup of the city was 49.6% male and 50.4% female.

The median income for a household in the city was $109,833. The per capita income for the city was $58,118. The median home cost in Newcastle is $511,500.

=== 2000 census ===
As of the 2000 census, there were 7,737 people, 3,028 households, and 2,189 families residing in the city. The population density was 1,731.5 inhabitants per square mile (668.5/km^{2}). There were 3,117 housing units at an average density of 697.6 per square mile (269.3/km^{2}). The racial makeup of the city was 75.05% White, 1.62% African American, 0.45% Native American, 18.25% Asian, 0.25% Pacific Islander, 1.36% from some other races and 3.02% from two or more races. Hispanic or Latino people of any race were 2.88% of the population.

There were 3,028 households, out of which 34.3% had children under the age of 18 living with them, 63.7% were married couples living together, 5.8% had a female householder with no husband present, and 27.7% were non-families. 20.5% of all households were made up of individuals, and 2.8% had someone living alone who was 65 years of age or older. The average household size was 2.55 and the average family size was 2.98.

In the city the population was spread out, with 23.4% under the age of 18, 7.2% from 18 to 24, 37.9% from 25 to 44, 24.9% from 45 to 64, and 6.6% who were 65 years of age or older. The median age was 36 years. For every 100 females, there were 100.0 males. For every 100 females age 18 and over, there were 97.9 males.

The median income for a household in the city was $80,320, and the median income for a family was $91,381. Males had a median income of $60,639 versus $41,868 for females. The per capita income for the city was $35,057. About 1.8% of families and 2.0% of the population were below the poverty line, including 1.1% of those under age 18 and 6.6% of those age 65 or over.

== Notable residents ==
Newcastle has been a preferred residence of numerous current and former Seattle Seahawks players, coaches, and front office personnel due to its close proximity to the NFL franchise's headquarters and practice facility on Lake Washington at the Virginia Mason Athletic Center (VMAC) in Renton.

- Gus Bradley, former defensive coordinator for the Seattle Seahawks
- Nate Burleson, former NFL player for the Seattle Seahawks and NFL commentator
- John Carlson, former NFL player for the Seattle Seahawks, Minnesota Vikings, and Arizona Cardinals
- Kam Chancellor, NFL player for the Seattle Seahawks
- James Hasty, former NFL player for the Kansas City Chiefs and the New York Jets
- Steve Hutchinson, former NFL player for the Seattle Seahawks
- Julian Peterson, former NFL player for the Seattle Seahawks
- Dan Quinn, former defensive coordinator for the Seattle Seahawks
- Mack Strong, former NFL player for the Seattle Seahawks
- Marcus Trufant, former NFL player for the Seattle Seahawks
- Alan White, drummer for the progressive rock band Yes

== City landmarks ==
The city of Newcastle has designated the following landmarks:

Landmark	Built	Listed	Address	Photo
Newcastle Cemetery	1879 (First burial)	1982	SW of 69th Way off 129th Avenue SE	
Pacific Coast Company House No. 75	1870s	1982	7210 138th Avenue SE	
Thomas Rouse Road	1880	1984	136th SE & 144th Place SE	

== Golf ==
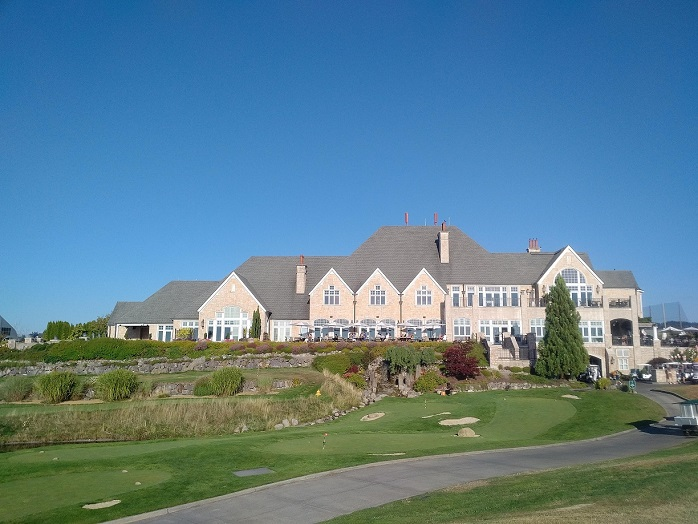
Newcastle golf clubhouse

Newcastle is known for its 36-hole, 350-acre (140 ha) golf complex, which features two championship, 18-hole courses known as the Coal Creek and China Creek courses. Designed by golf course architect Robert E. Cupp in consultation with PGA Masters champion Fred Couples and in partnership with Oki Golf, the courses have views of Mount Rainier, Lake Washington, Lake Sammamish, the Olympic and Cascade mountain ranges, and the downtown skylines of the cities of Seattle and Bellevue. Practice and hospitality facilities include a heated driving range, a pro shop, an 18-hole mini-golf/putting range, private (pitching/putting/chipping) practice tees, and a 44,000-square-foot (4,100 m^{2}) clubhouse with restaurants, pubs, and event spaces.

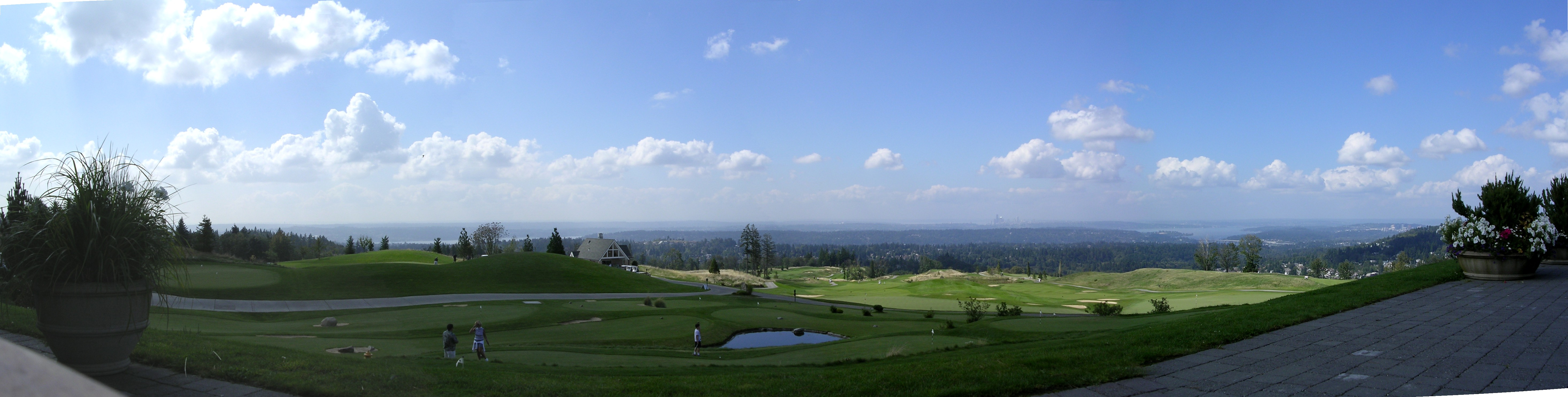
View from the Golf Club of Newcastle. The skyscrapers of both Seattle and Bellevue are visible, as well as Lake Washington and Mercer Island.
