= KBCS =

Radio station in Bellevue, Washington

- Bellevue, Washington; United States
- Broadcast area: Greater Seattle
- Frequency: 91.3 MHz (HD Radio)
- Branding: 91.3 KBCS

Programming
- Format: Variety
- Affiliations: Pacifica Radio; Westwood One

Ownership
- Owner: Bellevue College

History
- Call sign meaning: "Bellevue College Station"

Technical information
- Licensing authority: FCC
- Facility ID: 4627
- Class: C2
- ERP: 1,800 watts
- HAAT: 389 meters (1276 ft)
- Transmitter coordinates: 47°32′38″N 122°06′33″W

Links
- Public license information: Public file; LMS
- Webcast: Listen live
- Website: www.kbcs.fm

KBCS (91.3 MHz) is a public radio station licensed to Bellevue, Washington, and serving the Puget Sound region. It is owned by Bellevue College and broadcasts in HD Radio. The station has an effective radiated power (ERP) of 1,800 watts, broadcasting from a tower 1276 feet in height above average terrain (HAAT) on Cougar Mountain. KBCS studios are located on the Bellevue College campus in the city of Bellevue.

A wide variety of music is heard on KBCS-FM, including Electronic Dance Music (EDM), Funk, Latin Music, Brazilian, Underground Hip Hop, Folk, Blues, Gospel Music, Music of Asia, African Music, Reggae, Classical Music, World Music, Jazz and Americana. The station also airs local and world news and information, including nationally syndicated programs Democracy Now! and The Thom Hartmann Show, both heard weekday mornings.

KBCS is managed by a small staff, along with over 150 volunteer hosts, producers, journalists and administrators. The station offers training in journalism and broadcast production to the public. KBCS has launched the careers of a number of noted regional and national public radio professionals.

== History ==
A student sit-in protest led to the creation of the station. KBCS-FM went on the air on Monday, February 5, 1973, originally with 10 watts of power. It used equipment donated by Dorothy Stimson Bullitt of KING-FM. Its limited coverage meant the station could only be heard on campus and in the surrounding neighborhoods. By the late 1970s, the power was boosted to 100 watts.

It remained student-run until 1988 when Bellevue College administrators hired a general manager for the station and adopted a community radio model. In the 1990s, the power was again increased, this time to 7,900 watts, allowing KBCS to be heard around the Seattle metropolitan area. Over time, the station became self-sustaining, funded primarily by listener donations and on-air pledge drives.

== See also ==
- Community radio
- List of community radio stations in the United States
