= Pacific Coast Company House No. 75 =

- U.S. National Register of Historic Places
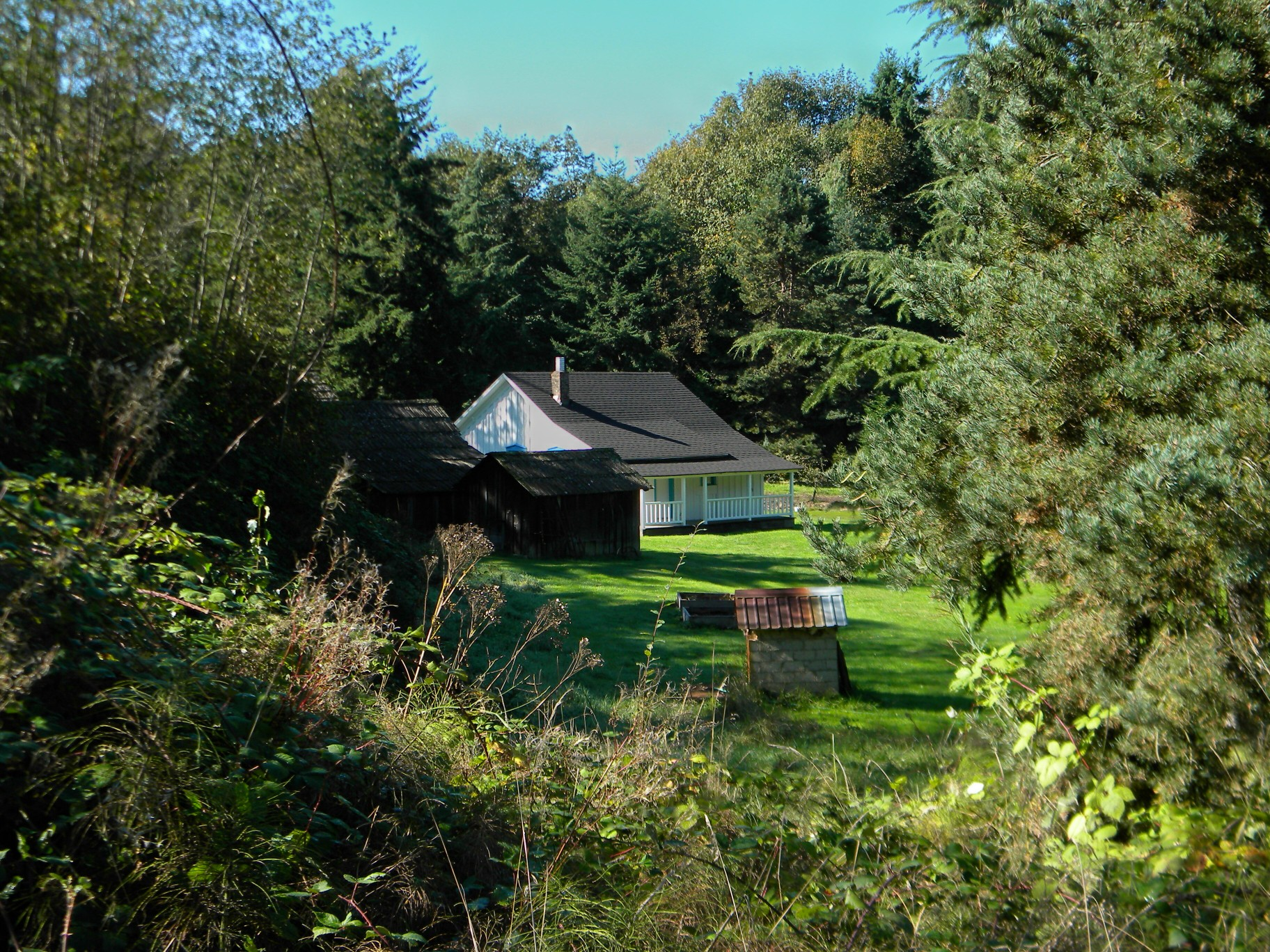
- Pacific Coast company house

- Location within Washington (state) Location within the United States
- Location: 7210 138th Avenue SE, Newcastle, Washington
- Coordinates: 47°32′17″N 122°09′21″W
- Area: 1.5 acres (0.61 ha)
- Built: 1880
- Architectural style: Pioneer Style
- NRHP reference No.: 79002534
- Added to NRHP: December 21, 1979

Pacific Coast Company House No. 75, also known as Baima House, is a private residence in Newcastle, Washington. Built in 1880 or earlier, it was added to the National Register of Historic Places in 1979. The house is the only surviving structure associated with the early development of coal mining at Newcastle and is an example of the type of housing in which miners lived.

== Description ==
The house is a 24 by 25 feet (7.3 m × 7.6 m) one-story wood frame building that is situated on a 1.5 acres (0.61 ha) rural lot. The interior is sectioned into four rooms. Front and back porches were added in 1928. Additional outbuildings were added in the early 1900s.

The original cedar shingles on the roof have been replaced with corrugated sheet metal and composition roofing. The original wood post foundation has been replaced with concrete blocks.

== History ==
Newcastle was home to hundreds of mining families during the latter half of the 1800s, many of whom were first and second generation immigrants. The mining town had more than 600 miners' dwellings, both two-story boarding homes and one-story cottages for bachelors and families. The Baima house was built in 1880 or earlier on land owned by the Seattle Coal and Transfer Company. In 1891, during a coal strike, the Oregon Improvement Company brought in black miners from Oregon to work the mines for lower wages, and some of those miners resided in the house.

When the land was sold to the Pacific Coast Company in 1898, the house was designated Company House No. 75. In 1907, an immigrant from Italy, Bernard Baima, and his family rented Company House No. 75. Bernard Baima died in 1916, and his widow purchased the house in 1920. The other houses and buildings in that mining community were demolished after mining ceased, but because members of the Baima family owned No. 75 and continued to live there through 1977, it is the sole remaining structure of the old mining town.

Later owners restored the house to good condition. In 2018, the property owners were working with the city on the possibility of establishing a small public park to preserve the house, and the city approved a non-binding memorandum of understanding in June, 2018.
