= KNHC =

- Seattle, Washington; United States
- Frequency: 89.5 MHz (HD Radio)
- Branding: Dance 89.5

Programming
- Format: Dance hits
- Subchannels: HD2: New wave "C89.5 Save The Wave"; HD3: Downtempo "Café Chill"

Ownership
- Owner: Seattle Public Schools

History
- First air date: January 25, 1971
- Former frequencies: 1210 kHz (1969–1971)
- Call sign meaning: Nathan Hale Communications

Technical information
- Licensing authority: FCC
- Facility ID: 59526
- Class: C1
- ERP: 8,500 watts
- HAAT: 372 metres (1,220 ft 6 in)
- Transmitter coordinates: 47°32′35″N 122°6′25″W

Links
- Public license information: Public file; LMS
- Webcast: Listen live
- Website: dance895.org

KNHC (89.5 FM) is a Class C1 high school radio station based in Seattle, Washington. It is the world's oldest, still remaining, dance music station.

Dance 89.5 offers a hybrid of current-based EDM product and Rhythmic Top 40 remixes, as well as new dance songs that are potential future hits – all of which are presented in a Top 40-like direction.

It is one of six stations monitored by Nielsen BDS for inclusion in Billboard magazine's weekly Dance/Mix Show Airplay chart. Its best coverage is in the Seattle metro area.

KNHC broadcasts in the HD Radio format.

== Operations and funding ==
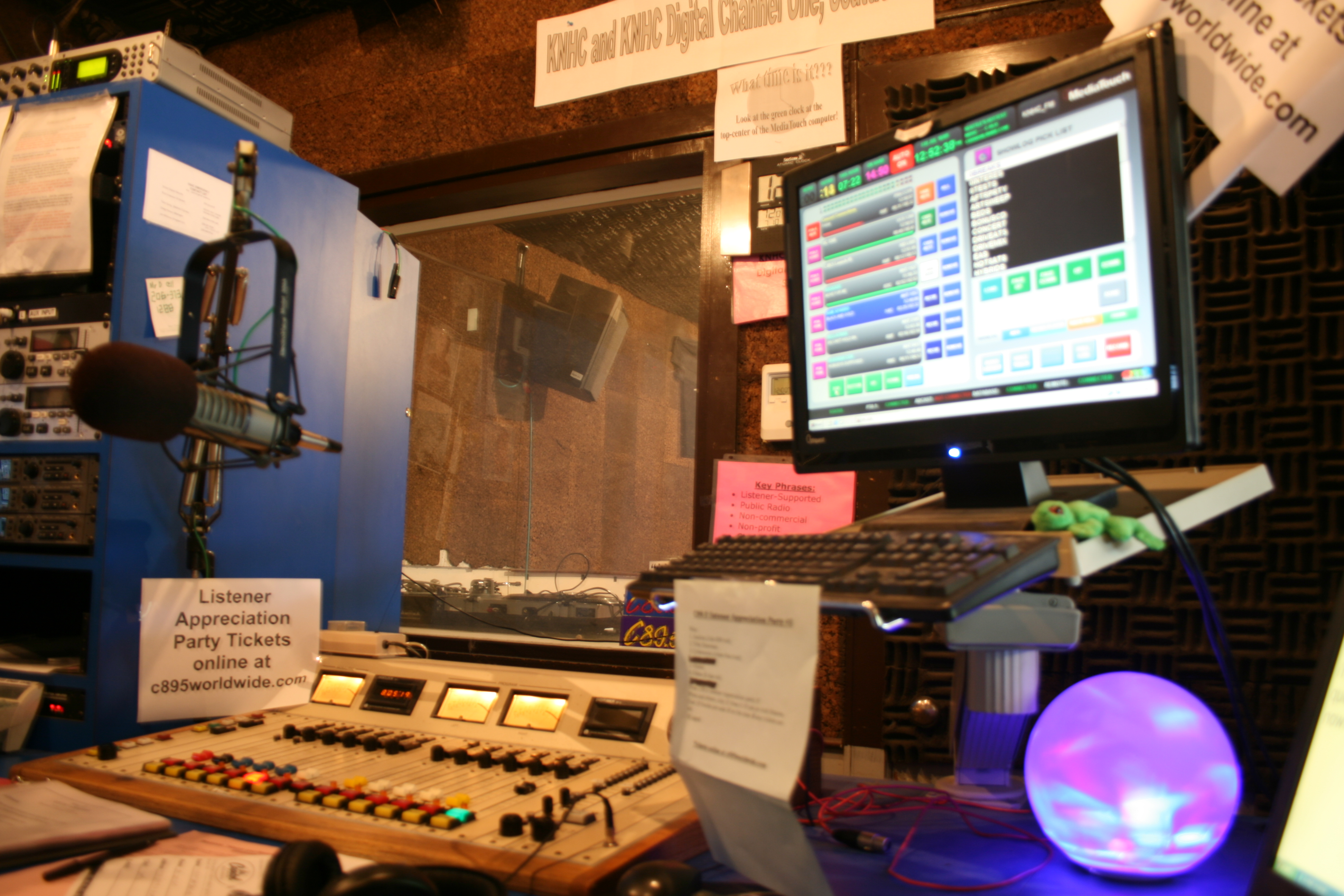
KNHC's On-Air Studio A before the 2009 rebuild

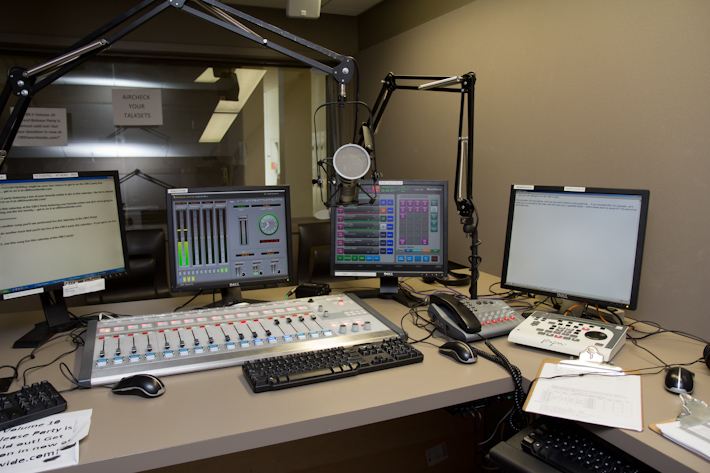
KNHC's On-Air Studio A after the 2009 rebuild

KNHC is owned by Seattle Public Schools and is operated by professional staff who provide training to students of Nathan Hale High School in north Seattle, as an electronic media course. Staff supervise students as they perform production, programming, music selection, copy writing, and on-air hosting. Some regular programs are hosted by alumni or non-student volunteers.

The station usually plays general electronic dance music during the day, with a number of specialty, genre-specific shows playing anything from house to industrial and trance after 6 pm. Its in-house live programming includes a four-hour weekday breakfast show, the 15-minute lunchtime mini-mix 8-Bit Work Break, the drive show Drive @ 5, and the new music show Test Spin.

Since around 2002, Seattle Public Schools has excluded funding for the station from its annual budget, except for a portion of the salaries and benefits for two staff. In 2019, that amounted to about 12% of the annual operating budget.

In 2015, the station became qualified to receive a Community Service Grant from the Corporation for Public Broadcasting.

The remaining operational budget of the station is raised via fund raising efforts, primarily from bi-annual pledge drives and corporate support announcements known as underwriting. As a non-commercial educational station, they cannot air traditional commercial advertisements.

== Broadcast coverage and online content ==
The station has one of the widest over-the-air coverage areas for what can be considered a high school radio station. Its signal is broadcast from Audacy's backup tower on Cougar Mountain, and covers an area from north of Seattle to roughly halfway into Tacoma, Washington and across the Puget Sound. The signal can be received as far east as Snoqualmie Pass and as far north as Victoria, British Columbia. It is licensed to Seattle. C89.5 attracts as many as 200,000 broadcast listeners per week.

The station also provides multiple live streams from its website, currently operating 32 kbit/s and 128 kbit/s MP3 streams as well as an Ogg stream, which can be received throughout the world via the Internet. C89.5 unveiled a major redesign of its website in March 25, 2018. Other upgrades include a real-time playlist and searchable database of the music that is heard on C89.5.

== History ==
KNHC logo used from 2001 to 2018.

KNHC went on the air as a very low power AM station, broadcasting with 100 milliwatts on 1210 kHz, in December 1969. Fairly quickly, however, the high school moved to build an FM station. In September 1970, KNHC received its FM construction permit and went on the air in January 1971. The transmitter was located at Wedgwood Elementary School, and the station broadcast with 10 watts, covering about a 5-mile circle in the north end of Seattle.

In September 1972, the station increased its power to 320 watts, and three months later, stereo broadcasts began. A second power increase, in November 1974, increased the ERP to 1,500 watts directional.

In December 1977, a HEW/NTIA grant created a sister studio at Cleveland High School on Beacon Hill. At the same time, the Mass Communications magnet school program at Hale begins, including courses in radio, television, journalism, photography, and graphic arts. Hence the station's call letters K - (U.S. broadcast stations west of the Mississippi), NH - (Nathan Hale H.S.) and C - (Cleveland H.S.).

KNHC's format entering the 1980s featured light rock and pop music, with specialty shows in the evenings and on weekends, including jazz and classical. After yet another power increase to 3 kW, this time non-directional, in October 1981, the station overhauled its format the next year to R&B and urban, prompting an increase in listenership. The "C89FM" name entered use in 1983. The C in C89.5 stood for Communications. New technologies were also deployed; in 1984, a satellite dish was added to receive the urban-oriented Sheridan Broadcasting Networks (an antecedent to today's American Urban Radio Networks), and in 1987, a microwave studio-transmitter link was brought into use along with a new and more efficient antenna.

One of the primary challenges in the 1980s was an application filed in December 1983 by the Jack Straw Memorial Foundation and its station, KRAB (now KNDD), to share time with KNHC. The commercial station, which had been facing financial difficulties, set up a noncommercial foundation with the goal of broadcasting in the reserved band between 88 and 92 MHz; Seattle Public Schools saw the filing as a takeover attempt. The case was designated for hearing in 1986, and the courts found in Nathan Hale High School's favor in May 1988 and again after Jack Straw appealed. Ultimately, the foundation built a noncommercial station in Everett, KSER 90.7.

In 1988, KNHC filed to increase its power to 30 kW, an increase that was put to use for the first time in 1991. The early 1990s also brought a magnet grant to bolster the high school's mass communications program and a renovation to the radio facility that added a second production studio, engineering room, and offices.

In 1995, the station began converting to a digital workflow (a process completed in 2000 with the use of MiniDisc-based equipment), and in 1997, KNHC began streaming on the Internet. The mid-1990s also saw the formation of an articulation agreement with Boise State University to give KNHC students opportunities to further their education.

KNHC's transmitter was moved to Cougar Mountain in 2002 after receiving FCC approval the year before. While the effective radiated power dropped, the coverage area was vastly improved with the move to the mountaintop site, primarily to the north of Seattle. The expanded reach of the station and its online stream prompted several distinctions in the decade: across the country, The Village Voice named KNHC best high school radio station in its "Best of New York" list in 2003, and in 2004, the station became the first non-commercial station in the United States to be a monitored reporter when they joined the Billboard Magazine Dance Radio Airplay panel. Additional technical and facilities improvements, came in 2008, when KNHC installed a new transmitter on Cougar Mountain and began broadcasting in HD Radio, and in November 2009, when it moved into brand-new digital studios and classrooms at Nathan Hale.

Final logo as "C", used from 2017 to 2026

On the morning of July 7, 2026, KNHC relaunched as "Dance 89.5", along with now positioning itself as "Seattle's Party Radio", which the station stated "more clearly reflects the station’s role as the soundtrack to Seattle’s dance music community". June Fox, general manager of KNHC, said “While our name is changing, our mission remains the same. Dance 89.5 reflects who we’ve always been: a station dedicated to dance music, community, and creating memorable experiences for our listeners and students. As Seattle’s Party Radio, we’re excited to continue bringing people together through the music they love”. KNHC registered a 1.0 share in the May 2026 Nielsen books.
