= Cougar Mountain Regional Wildland Park =

Park in King County, Washington, US

- IUCN category IV (habitat/species management area)
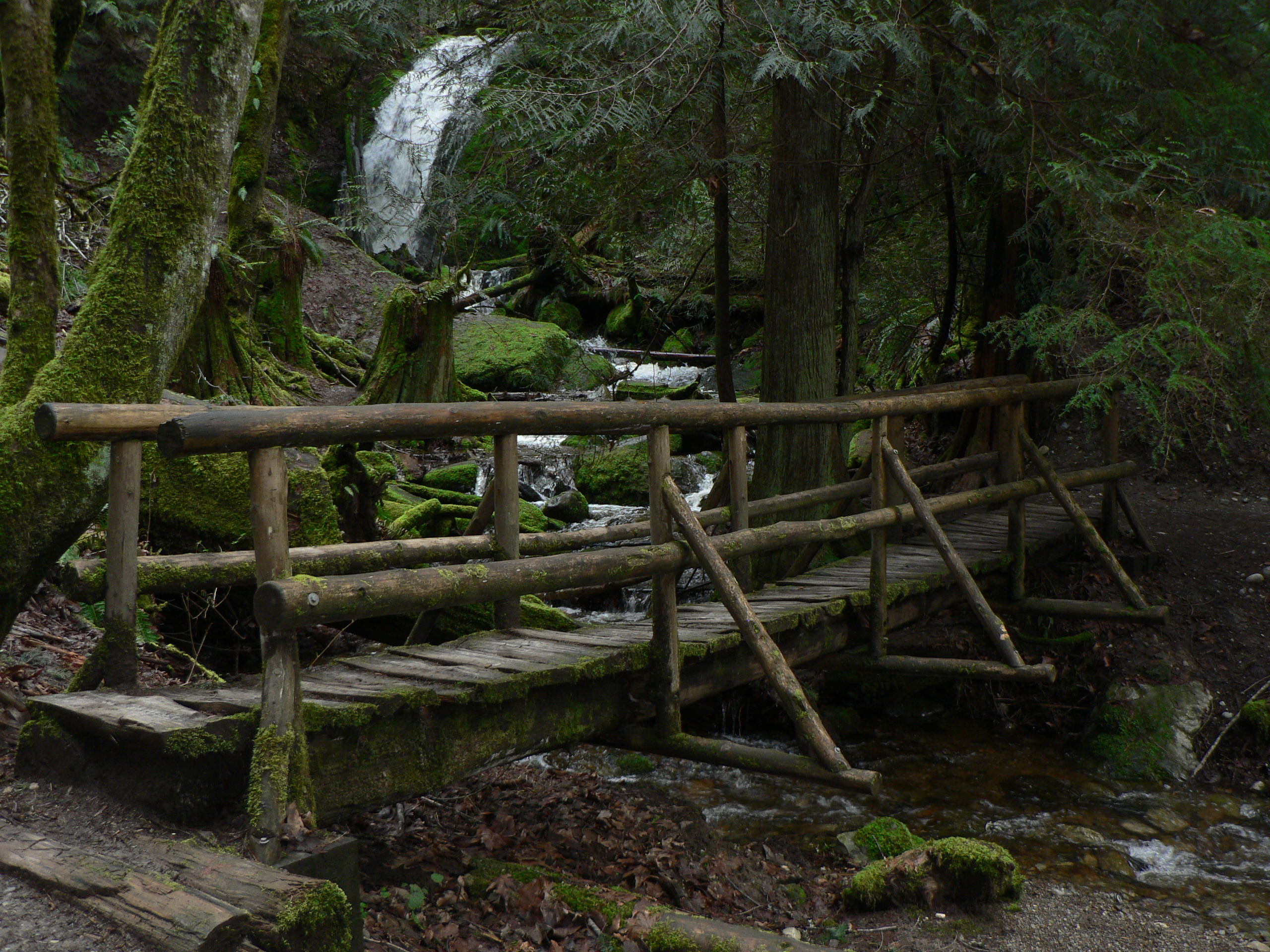
- Coal Creek Falls foot bridge with falls in background

- Location within Washington (state) Location within the United States
- Location: Washington, USA
- Nearest city: Seattle
- Coordinates: 47°31′15″N 122°05′29″W
- Area: 3,115 acres (12.61 km^{2})
- Established: January 1985
- Governing body: King County Parks and Recreation Division

Cougar Mountain Regional Wildland Park is a regional park in King County, Washington, near the towns of Bellevue and Issaquah. The park was established in June 1983 to protect the central core of Cougar Mountain, the park covers 3,115 acres (12.61 km^{2}) with 38 miles (61 km) of hiking trails and 12 miles (19 km) of equestrian trails.

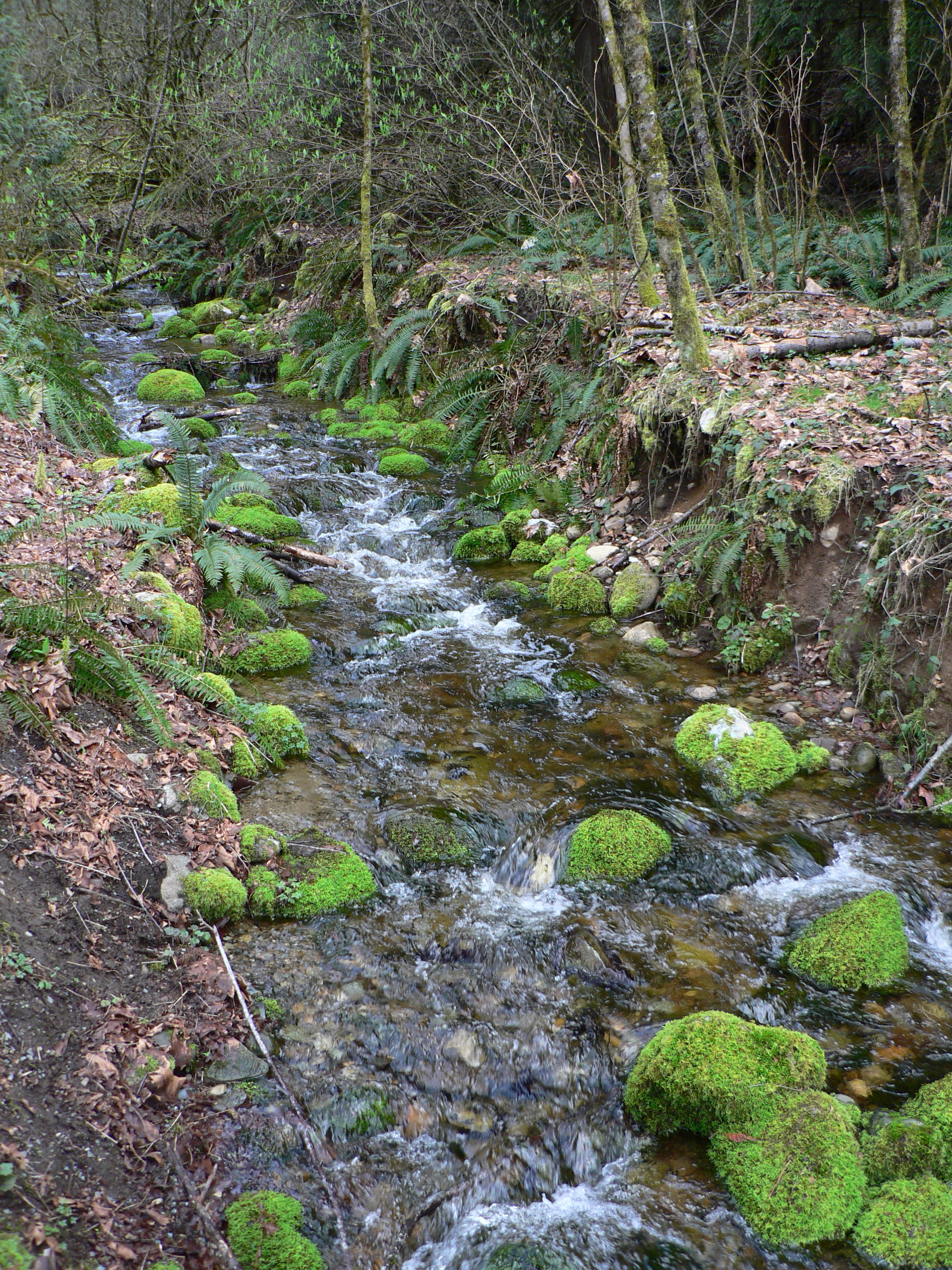
Coal Creek.

== Access ==
There are four major trailheads within the park. Maps are available at these trailheads, and there are directional signs at major trail intersections. Equestrian access is available at all but the first of these. Bicycles are not allowed on any trails.

1. Jim Whittaker Wilderness Peak Trailhead (SR 900/Renton-Issaquah Road SE 3.3 miles south of I-90): This small parking area provides access to the trail system on the east side of the park via the Whittaker Wilderness Peak Trail. It was formerly called the Wilderness Creek Trailhead, but renamed on September 26, 2013, at a ceremony attended by Jim Whittaker and King County Executive Dow Constantine. At the same time, connecting trails were dedicated in Whittaker's name and that of his climbing companion Nawang Gombu.
2. Harvey Manning Trailhead (SE Cougar Mountain Drive): This area is located close to the top of Cougar Mountain and provides wonderful views to the north (sometimes one can catch a glimpse of Mt. Baker). Many of the wildland park's trails are accessed from this trailhead.
3. Sky Country Trailhead (166th Way SE) is located near the former Nike missile site.
4. Red Town Trailhead (Lakemont Blvd. SE/Newcastle Coal Creek Rd.) provides quick access to many historical mining exhibits in the northwest sector of the park, and also provides access to the adjacent Coal Creek Trail.

Among other smaller trailheads which provide on-street parking and access directly or via connecting trails to the park trail system are the following:

1. Newcastle Crosstown Trail Trailhead at SE 85th St near 146th Pl SE in Newcastle
2. Cul de sac at end of 161st Ave SE south of SE Cougar Mountain Way in Bellevue
3. Indian Trail/Licorice Fern Trail crossing of SE Licorice Way above 169th Ave SE on the south side of the park
4. Ring Road Trailhead located in the private area above Wilderness Creek Trail
5. Bear Ridge Trailhead on SR900 1 mile south of Newport Way with overflow area just south of creek culvert.
6. Big Tree Ridge Trailhead on Newport Way NW 1/2 mile NW of SR-900 Renton-Issaquah Road SE (pullover parking).
7. Talus Neighborhood: The Bridges neighborhood in SW corner (Talus Bridge Trail) and Shangri-la Way at center west (Surprise Creek Trail)
8. Harvey Manning Park at Talus. Restrooms, water fountains, play equipment.

== Geography ==
=== Environs ===
The park is bordered on the north by the Lakemont neighborhood in the city of Bellevue and on the northeast by the city of Issaquah. The park is bounded on the east by the 260-acre Talus Open Space. State Route 900 forms the southeastern border. Neighboring Squak Mountain looms to the southeast and the farms of May Creek valley lie to the south. To the southwest is the city of Renton. The city of Newcastle, ranging over the Newport Hills occupies the western portion of Cougar Mountain, with several smaller parcels designated the China Creek Open Space abutting the park on the west and housing surrounding the Newcastle Golf Club directly to the west. To the northwest of the Red Town Trailhead is the deep gully of Coal Creek, with its own separate park, the Coal Creek Natural Area managed by the City of Bellevue which divides Newcastle from Bellevue. A 4 1/2-mile trail through the latter continues down to I-405. The park is fully within the Mountains to Sound Greenway.

=== Summits ===
- AA Peak - 1,480 feet (450 m). This peak overlooks Radar Park, a former Cold War military installation. Excellent views to the north of Lake Sammamish and Mount Baker are obtained here. The only summit reachable by car.
- Claypit Peak - 1,560 feet (480 m). Separated from Wilderness Peak by a saddle, Claypit Peak looms above a 150-acre (0.61 km^{2}) open pit, the one-time source of clay for bricks, leased by Mutual Materials in Newcastle. It is unmarked on maps and is in the wilderness portion of the park designated Habitat Conservation Area with no access.
- Deceiver Ridge - 1,220 feet (370 m). A broad plateau bristling with second-growth fir.
- Long View Peak - 1,445 feet (440 m). This summit has a horse hitch, a bench, and a view to the south.
- Marshall's Hill - 1,120 feet (340 m). Dominating the Renton side of Cougar Mountain, the top of Marshall's Hill is reached by switchbacks from the De Leo Wall.
- Reichert's Hill - 1,420 feet (430 m). Also known as Radio Hill or Goat Hill, this is the site of many radio and television station broadcast antennas.
- Ring Road Peak - 1,245 feet (379 m). On the shoulder of Long View Peak. The summit is outside the Park, on private property.
- Wilderness Peak - 1,595 feet (486 m). There is no view owing to a stand of old growth timber, but Wilderness Peak is the highest elevation in the park. There is a summit register.

== Hydrography ==
=== Creeks ===
The hilltops of Cougar Mountain form a rough horseshoe-shape around the Klondike Marsh headwaters of Coal Creek, which runs northwest to Lake Washington through Coal Creek Park. Long Marsh Creek, Far Country Creek, Cabbage Creek, and Wilderness Creek are tributaries of May Creek, draining the south side of Cougar Mountain to Lake Washington. Deeply etching the sandstone precipice on the north and east side, Lewis Creek, Kline Creek, AA Creek, West Tibbets Creek, and Claypit Creek carry their water to Lake Sammamish.

=== Marshes ===
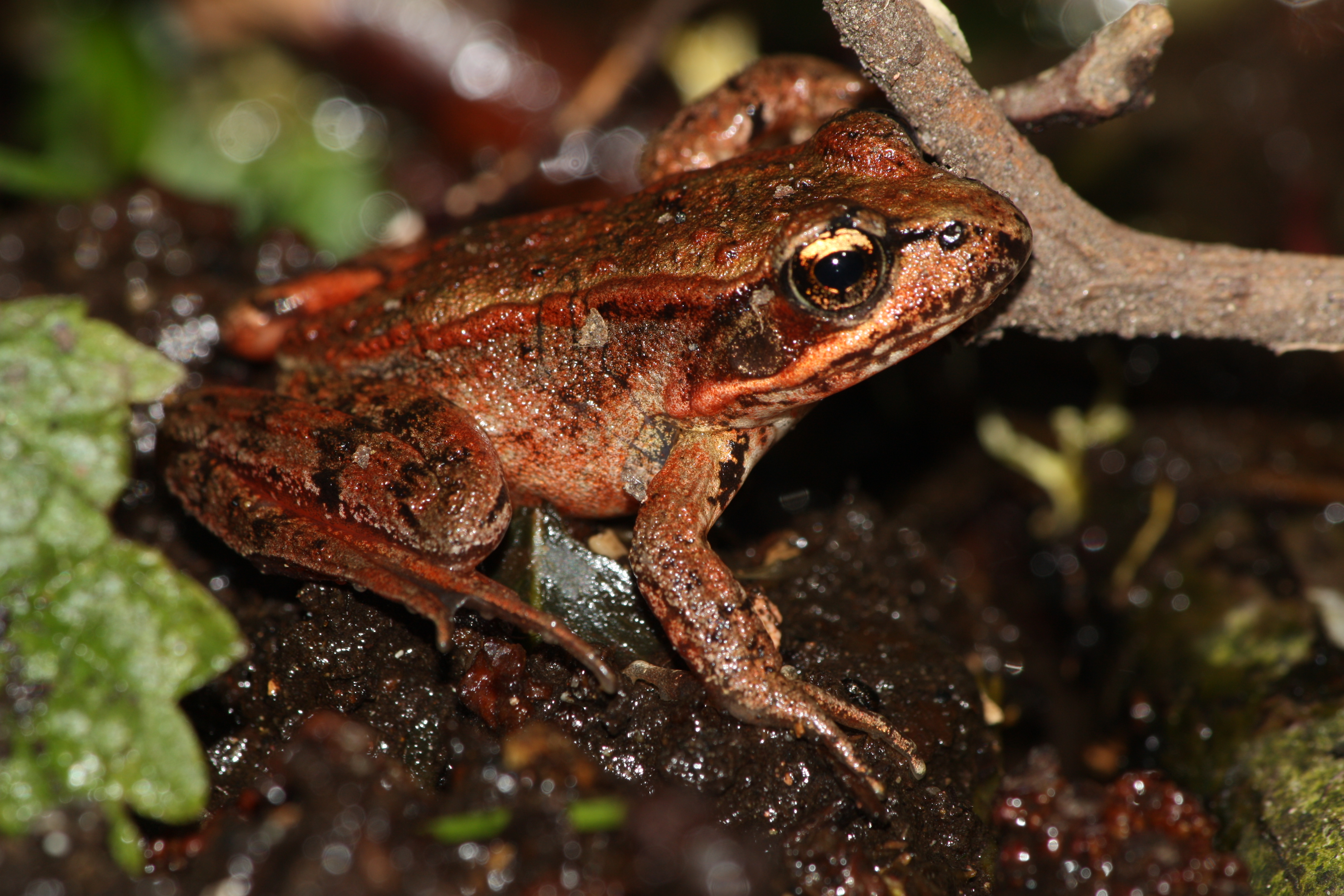
Northern Red-legged Frog along the Klondike Swamp Trail.

- Blackwater Pond - In the highlands between Wilderness Peak and Claypit Peak, drains east to Tibbets Creek.
- Jerry's Duck Pond - A quiet wooded man-made pond near the summit of Claypit Peak.
- Klondike Marsh - A former reservoir providing water for coal-car steam hoists.
- Long Marsh - Large swamp between the Wildside Trail and Indian Trail.
- Shy Bear Marsh - The source of Cabbage Creek in the most remote part of the park.
- Tibbett's Marsh - The source of West Tibbett's Creek, crossed by a massive downed cedar log.
- Trog Swamp - Wetland along the Far Country Trail.
- Lake Boren - Outside of the park, in a separate park in Newcastle. Lake Boren is the largest body of water in the highlands of Cougar Mountain.

=== Waterfalls ===
There are five named waterfalls within or near Cougar Mountain Regional Wildland Park.

- Coal Creek Falls 25 feet (7.6 m), seasonal flow. At Coal Creek near the Quarry Trail.
- Doughty Falls - At Cabbage Creek on the Deceiver Trail.
- Far Country Falls - At Far Country Creek on the Indian Trail.
- Sandstone Falls - On the Primrose Trail in Coal Creek Park.
- North Fork Falls - 20 feet (6.1 m), year-round flow. Actually on the trail through Bellevue's Coal Creek Natural Area, across the road from the Red Town Trailhead.

== Official trails ==
A notice on the official Cougar Mountain Regional Wildlands Park map cautions "Due to safety hazards from historical mining activities in this park you must stay on the trails identified on this map." Copies of the map are available at the major trailheads.

=== North side ===
Possible bear or cougar clawmarks on a tree along the AA Ridge Trail

- N1: Coal Creek Trail - Trail formerly identified on maps as N1 is actually in the Bellevue system of open spaces rather than the King County park. It begins where Coal Creek Parkway dips to cross the creek. Scenic Brickyard Creek joins from the south in a steep descent. At a Y the Primrose Trail peels off to tour the creek at its most scenic reach in a canyon where Sandstone Falls is found. The main line tours the relics of an old farm and is joined by the Primrose Trail again further on. Strange hummocks are found in this area which were debris piles created during coal mining operations more than a century ago. A steep road leaves the trail to the site of the Cinder Mine. The last 0.75-mile (1.21 km) of the trail gently ascends to the Red Town trailhead with North Fork Falls and many coal-mining relics found along the way.
- N2: Military Road Trail - Trail begins at Red Town trailhead and ascends the old U.S. Army route (originally running to Issaquah) to the gate which marks the beginning of the Clay Pit Road. This is the only part of the Military Road that is accessed by an official trail. The route of the old road runs over Radio Hill and through private land, and it enters the park again above the Precipice Bottom Trail in a section informally called Harvey's Magic Quarter Mile.
- N3: Radio Peak Trail - Trail forks from the Coyote Creek Trail along the western edge of the Klondike Marsh and steadily ascends a rather narrow ridge populated with a fine stand of Douglas fir. At the summit the trail arrives at a large cluster of radio transmitters and a service road that can take you down to Cougar Mountain Drive, but officially the trail ends here.
- N4: Coyote Creek Trail - Trail begins where Cougar Mountain Drive changes from blacktop to gravel. Also known as "Bill's Trail" (because Bill Culbert preferred to use this route to transit the area during high rains), the path meanders along the western edge of Klondike Swamp, crosses a clearing, and intersects the Claypit Road directly across from the terminus of the Cave Hole Trail.
- N5: Klondike Swamp Trail - Trail forks from the Coyote Creek Trail and passes along the base of Anti-Aircraft Peak where it meets the Klondike Swamp. An old woods road, the trail is relatively flat and straight, offering a quick route into the heart of Cougar Mountain. It passes a large vine maple that forms a canopy before ending at the Cougar Pass Trail.
- N6: Lost Beagle Trail - Trail ascends from the Klondike Swamp Trail through cool forest, switchbacking east to the summit area of Anti-Aircraft Peak. Radar Park has interpretive signs and the concrete foundations of a military installation that has long been abandoned. In World War II this was the site of anti-aircraft gun emplacements for possible Japanese attack. Later, Nike missiles were installed nearby, directed by personnel stationed here.
- N7: Harvey Manning Trail - Trail begins near the summit of Anti-Aircraft Peak and runs south down the gentle spine of the peak through a mixed coniferous and deciduous forest, reaching Cougar Pass which divides the watersheds of Coal Creek and West Tibbetts Creek.
- N8: Cougar Pass Trail - Trail connects the Klondike Swamp Trail with the Tibbetts Marsh Trail, striking the AA Ridge Trail at the highest point. It provides an alternative to the Clay Pit Road which parallels it just to the south.
- N9: Tibbett's Marsh Trail - Trail begins at Radar Park and provides the most direct route to the Claypit area, crossing the mile-wide saddle between AA and Claypit Peaks. It spans the marsh on a giant fallen cedar which has been converted into an ad hoc bridge with many axe strokes.
- N10: Primrose Overlook Trail - Trail descends from Little Creek Trail to a loop above a tributary creek to the North Fork of Coal Creek.
- N11: Little Creek Trail - Trail starts at small trailhead near the south end of 161st Ave SE and crosses several small drainages to meet Military Road Trail.

=== East side ===
- E1: Shangri-La Trail - Trail begins at the Radar Park trailhead and descends the eastern flanks of Cougar Mountain to the Talus development. Wide and gently sloping, the former logging road parallels the Surprise Creek Trail. The forest has not yet grown again sufficiently to permit this trail to lose its character as a road.
- E2: Surprise Creek Trail - Trail begins at the Shangri-La Trail and provides a more scenic route down to the Issaquah Reservoir. It accesses the Powerline Trail (now impassable) at two points.
- E3: Bear Ridge Trail - Trail begins at the terminus of the SR900 sidewalk and a small three-car alcove 0.9 miles (1.4 km) one mile south of Newport Way on State Route 900 and forks left. Following a gently ascending former road grade through an alder forest, the trail passes a junction with Talus Bridge Trail and a section corner marker before reaching Fantastic Erratic, a fern covered boulder about the size of a two-car garage deposited during the ice age by the Canadian glacier. The Trail switchbacks up to an undissected plateau of knee-high ferns dotted with islands of oak, maple, alder, and young fir. After crossing two branches of West Tibbetts Creek, the trail bends north to intersect the Shangri-La Trail.
- E4: Whittaker Wilderness Peak Trail (formerly Wilderness Creek Trail and E-6 Wilderness Peak Trail) - Trail begins at the trailhead on State Route 900, about a mile north of May Valley Road. With many switchbacks it ascends the creek to Boulders Junction, does a hairpin turn and mounts a ridge on the right bank. A view back down to the tiny people on the bridge below surprises hikers with how high they've gone. The trail passes Cougar Mountain Cave formed by talus fallen from the clifftops high above and reaches Shy Bear Pass. From Shy Bear pass the trail continues to the highest point on Cougar Mountain, where trees rise at least another 100 feet (30 m) but block any view. This is the uppermost edge of a large forest of virgin Douglas firs that drapes the east ridge of the peak almost all the way down to the highway. Plaques on the bridge near the start of the trail note its dedication and of E5 to the first American to summit Mount Everest and his Nepalese Sherpa climbing companion Nawang Gombu.
- E5: Gombu Wilderness Cliffs Trail - Trail begins at Boulder Junction on the Whittaker Wilderness Peak mainline and ascends to a cliff-top view of Squak Mountain and soon after another view of Mount Rainier. Wilderness Creek is far, far below. The trail mounts to the beautiful forest of second growth Douglas fir and salal underbrush on the rounded southern bulk of Wilderness Peak, passes a pond called Wilderness "Lake", and attains the summit with a bench, where one may leave a message in the register.
- E7: Powerline Trail - Trail begins along the Surprise Creek trail, reaches a power line right-of-way, and drops straight down toward Goode's Corner, making only one bend into the woods to switchback through a zone of steep rocks. From this trail it is possible to leave the Park Boundaries and explore the northern Precipice. Note: Trail unmaintained & impassable 2006–2014. Periodic maintenance by Puget Power may restore this route to minimal standards in future.
- E8: No Name Trail - Trail is a relatively short, featureless connector between the Shangri-La Trail and Surprise Creek Trail. It links the northern and southern halves of the Precipice Trail.
- E9: Protector Trail - Trail begins along Tibbett's Marsh Trail and runs to an indistinct spur of AA Peak that forms a wall containing the wetland. Originally this ridge was not in the Park, and Harvey Manning feared it would be developed. Now it is deep inside the Park and the trail links to the Shangri-La Trail.
- E10: West Tibbetts Creek Trail - Trail begins along the Tibbetts Marsh Trail, at a bend. The trail descends gently along a shallow ravine of the creek until it meets the Bear Ridge Trail. A lower, unofficial section formerly reaching the Bear Ridge trailhead on SR900 is impassable due to disuse and course changes in West Tibbetts Creek.
- E11: Squak Mountain Connector Trail (formerly Old Ford Trail)- Trail traverses east from lower section of Gombu Wilderness Cliffs trail past the former site of a wrecked Ford, and then down to a pullover parking spot on SR-900 . The driveway across from the pullover gives informal access to the West Access trail in the Squak Mountain State Park trail system
- E12: Red Cedars Trail - Trail descends from Surprise Creek Trail to the top of Big Tree Ridge.
- E13: Precipice Top Trail - Trail traverses from Surprise Creek Trail to Military Ridge Trail shortly before its junction with Big Tree Ridge Trail. Reconstructed & rerouted 2014.
- E14: Military Ridge Trail - Originally a section of the Military Road, the trail descends from Big Tree Ridge Trail, soon passing Precipice Top Trail, crossing two creeks and briefly leaving public land to reach an old roadbed where it becomes the Telephone Trail and descends to Harvey Manning Park (City of Issaquah).
- E15: Big Tree Ridge Trail - From a gated trailhead (pullover parking) on Newport Way .5 miles from the Issaquah Park & Ride, the trail follows an old road grade through an alder swamp before ascending Big Tree Ridge above AA Creek, with winter views of Lake Sammamish and the Coastal Range. At a southerly switchback .4 mi. from the trailhead a short connector joins unobtrusively to the Precipice Bottom Trail (unofficial). Just above the final crest it reaches Military Ridge Trail (descending to Issaquah trails) shortly before the Red Cedars Trail (ascending to County trails). A short loop of the historic route on the upper crest was closed when the trail was rerouted to public property.

=== South side ===
- S1: Far Country Trail - Trail begins on the Indian Trail and gently switchbacks up through a beautiful glade to a clearing called Far Country Lookout, with views toward Renton and Tukwila. Harvey Manning named this area the Far Country because ice-age glaciers had eroded a south-flowing watershed where he expected to find a containing ridge and headwaters on his first exploration. He felt he had somehow crossed into a magical country far from home.
- S2: Shy Bear Trail - Trail begins at Far Country Lookout (indeed it is merely the continuation of the Far Country Trail), crosses a shoulder of Deceiver Ridge and drops to Shy Bear Marsh, which it crosses on a series of boardwalks. At this point a hiker is as far as anyone can get from a trailhead, this is the most remote part of Cougar Mountain. From the swamp the trail ascends to Shy Bear Pass, where a number of trails all come together in a small area.
- S3: Deceiver Trail - Trail forks off from Shy Bear Trail with a steel artifact of the logging days lying nearby. It ascends to the broad summit of Deceiver Ridge and drops to Cabbage Creek, just above Doughty Falls. The trail then switchbacks up to the summit of Long View Peak with an excellent window through the trees south.
- S4: Long View Peak Trail - Trail begins at the summit of Long View Peak and drops to Shy Bear Pass. It is really just a continuation of the Deceiver Trail.
- S5: Ring Road Trail - Trail begins along the Long View Peak Trail and crosses a saddle to reach a dirt road near the summit of Ring Road Peak (which actually lies outside of the park). Soon after this, at a view of Mount Rainier, private property is reached, marking the end of the trail.
- S6: Licorice Fern Trail: - Trail begins near the Indian Trail trailhead and forks left behind a row of houses, following a ravine of Far Country Creek to Licorice Fern Way. The trail resumes on the other side of the road, soon passing Trog Swamp and Surprise Wall. The trail resembles the Coal Creek Trail as it passes through a century-old forest, sometimes along the creek, sometimes high on the wall, to the lower trailhead on Licorice Fern Way where a homeowner dedicated a permanent easement and planted fruit trees and tulips.

=== Central basins ===
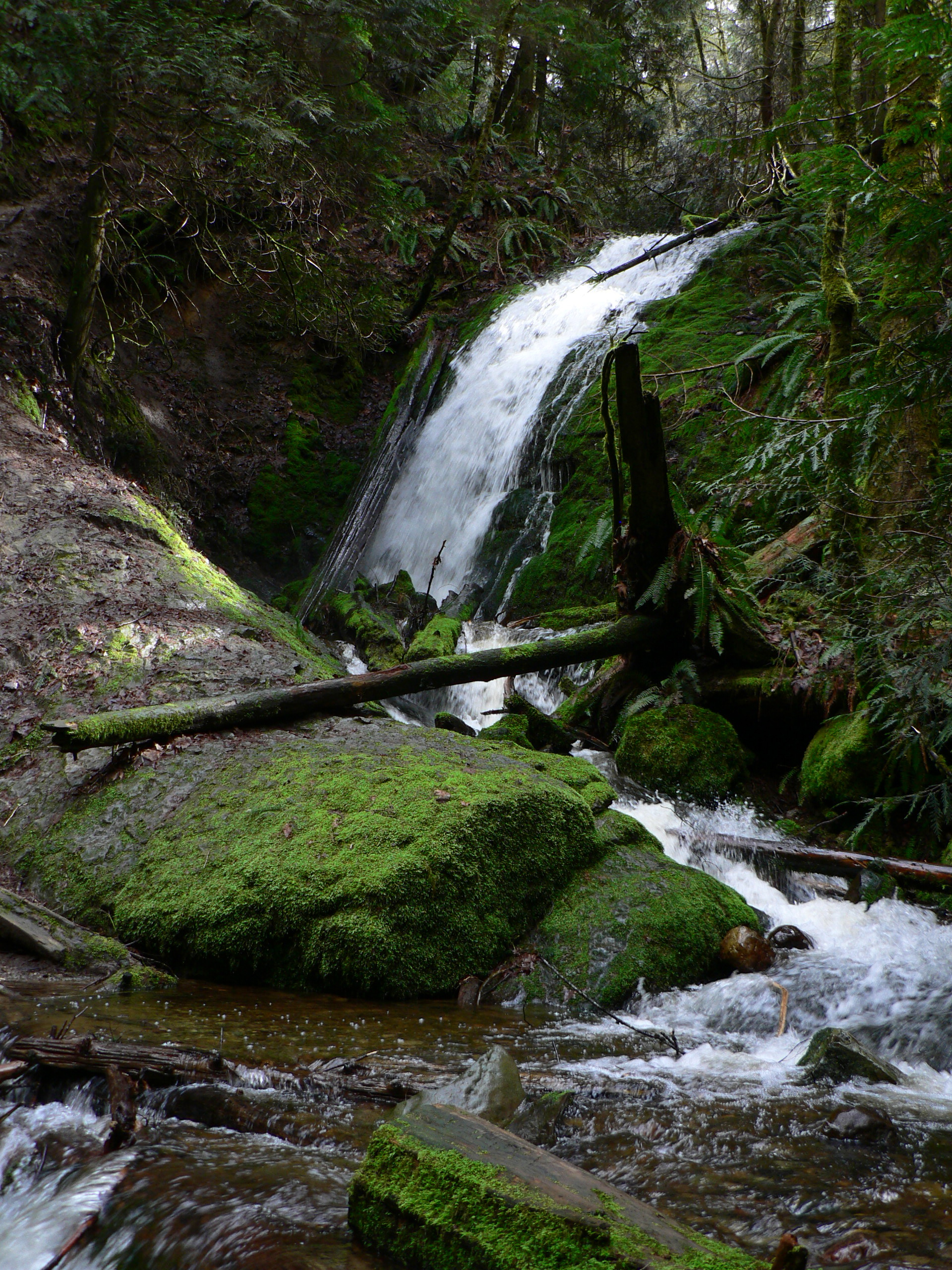
Coal Creek Falls

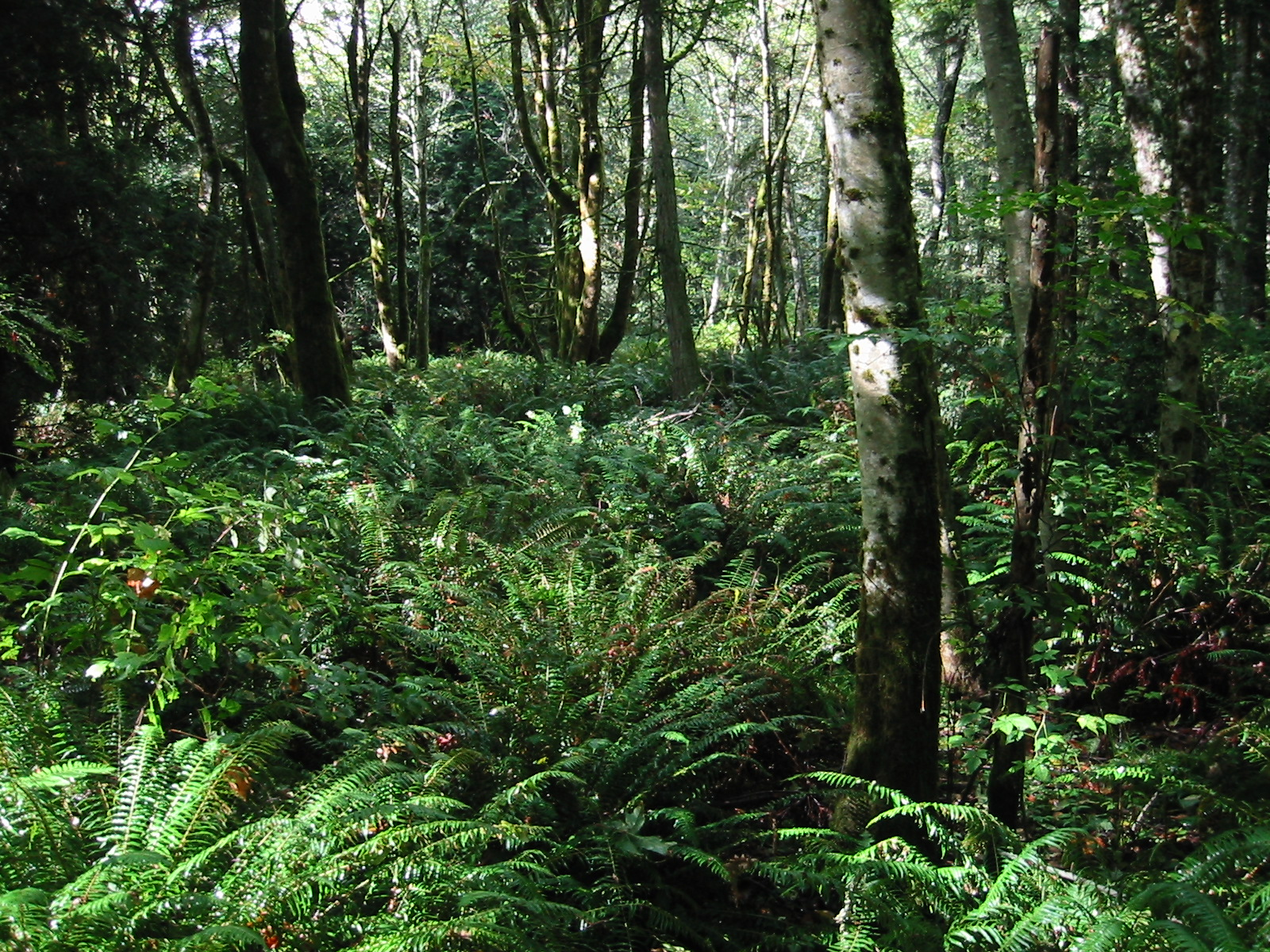
Red Alder forest near Sky Country Trailhead

- C1: Clay Pit Road - An extension of 166th Avenue, this gravel road extends 1.3 miles from the gate near the Sky Country Trailhead all the way to the former Clay Pit. It provides access to a meadow at Nike Park, where Nike anti-aircraft missiles were set up to defend against Soviet bombers in the Cold War and other trails in the northeast and southeast portions of the park. There is an ample parking area and trailhead facilities at the Sky Country Trailhead. The clay pit at the end of the road was leased by Mutual Materials to obtain raw material for bricks. The brick plant in Newcastle is shut down and being redeveloped, and the pit itself was graded and seeded in 2015 as a large meadow with a view toward Tiger Mountain to the east.
- C2: Red Town Creek Trail - Trail connects the Cave Hole Trail to the Military Road Trail and provides access to the Red Town Creek Dam. Water from the lake which existed here before the dam silted up was used to provide steam for hauling the coal cars out of the mine shafts.
- C3: Cave Hole Trail - Trail begins on the Red Town Trail and provides the main route from the Red Town area to the higher elevations of Cougar Mountain. The former wagon road to the Klondike Dam, it passes some rather large holes which were formed by earth collapsing into coal seams as they were mined.
- C4: Coal Creek Falls Trail - Trail forks off from the Cave Hole Trail and runs more-or-less level south to a 25-foot (7.6 m) cataract on Coal Creek which is one of the most popular destinations in the Park, especially during periods of heavy runoff. Thereafter the trail ascends to meet the Quarry Trail.
- C6: Quarry Trail - Trail begins on the Indian Trail near a stone quarry and ascends the ravine of Shy Bear Creek (the old route ascended the ridge between this creek and Coal Creek). It intercepts Fred's Railroad Trail very near the terminus of that trail with the Shy Bear Trail.
- C7: Fred's Railroad Trail - Trail begins at the Clay Pit Road across the street from the Cougar Pass Trail endpoint. It runs along a former railroad bed and therefore has no sharp turns or steep inclines. Many logging structures can be seen along the sides of the trail as it runs south to meet the Shy Bear Trail.
- C8: East Fork Trail - Trail begins on Fred's Railroad Trail and ascends the east branch of Coal Creek all the way to its source. It passes along the serene waters of Jerry's Duckpond before arriving at the lip of the Clay Pit on a shoulder of Clay Pit Peak.
- C9: Bypass Trail - Trail begins at the intersection of Fred's Railroad Trail and Clay Pit Road and drops to the Cave Hole Trail. It provides a way to transit the area without using the road.
- C10: Mine Shaft Trail - Trail begins at Jerry's Duckpond and runs to a large, deep mineshaft covered with a grid of rebar. It is possible to safely stand on this grate over the middle of the hole. The shaft is slightly inclined and actually goes below sea level. After the mine shaft the trail intersects the road.
- C11: Old Man's Trail - Trail connects from near the Nike site to Cave Hole Trail and the trail network to the north and east.
- C12: Nike Horse Trail - Trail connects from Cave Hole Trail to Fred's Railroad Trail for access to trails to north and east.
- C13: Sky Country Trail - Trail connects Sky Country Trailhead to Military Road Trail, thus avoiding need to walk on entrance road.

=== West side ===
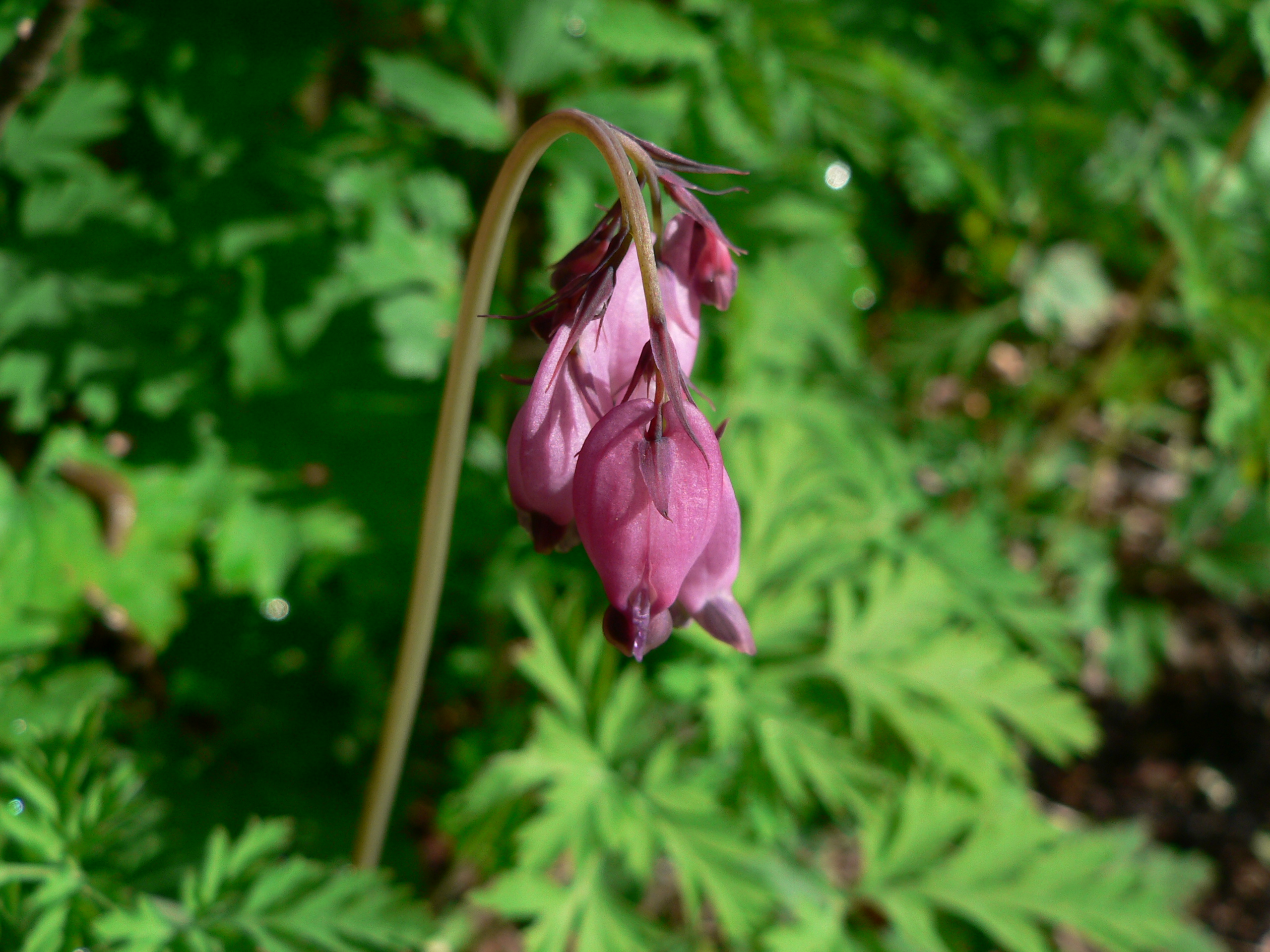
Western Bleeding Heart along Wildside Trail

- W1: Wildside Trail - Trail begins at the Rainbow Town Trail and runs along the western side of the valley of Coal Creek. Ironically, development has pressed close to this trail at some points and reduced its wild character. After crossing Marshall's Hill trail it skirts Long Marsh to an intersection with the Deleo Wall Trail.
- W2: Red Town Trail - Trail begins at the Red Town trailhead and runs along the eastern side of the valley of Coal Creek to the Ballpark Meadow restoration project.
- W3: Rainbow Town Trail - Trail begins along the Red Town Trail and passes the Ford Slope coal mining exhibit, which includes pictures of the Red Town area at the height of the coal-mining times. The visitor is struck by how thoroughly nature has reclaimed the area.
- W4: Steam Hoist Trail - Trail begins along the Wildside Trail and after crossing the creek loops back to the Rainbow Town Trail, touring many artifacts of the coal-mining days, including an intact concrete dam and the massive concrete foundation for the old steam hoist, which would almost be mistaken for a natural feature but for all the right angles.
- W5: China Creek Trail - Trail begins at the Red Town trailhead and runs to the edge of the Park, providing access to the Rainbow Town Trail. In the days before the landfill became a golf course this trail provided access to the network of trails in the saddle between Marshall's Hill and Mt. Trashmore.
- W6: Marshall's Hill Trail - Trail begins on the Wildside Trail and ascends to a view of the Coal Creek basin with the rest of Cougar Mountain looming behind it. It continues on to the Deleo Wall Trail and a water tower access road which descends to a neighborhood cul-de-sac that can serve as a trailhead for the western trail system.
- W7: Indian Trail - Trail begins at a cul-de-sac on 171st Avenue where King County owns two vacant lots to ensure access. This is believed to be part of the route used by the Duwamish tribe and others to go between Coal Creek and May Creek. It provides access to Far Country Falls and terminates at the Ballfield.
- W9: Deleo Wall Trail - Trail begins along the Indian Trail and passes an unnamed wetland before ascending steadily to the top of Deleo Wall, a 600-foot (180 m) cliff looking out over May Valley to Mount Rainier. From the viewpoint a series of well-constructed switchbacks ascends to the summit of Marshall's Hill, where Picture Buttress looks down to a forest glade. The trail intersects a water tower access road and the Marshall's Hill Trail, with a remarkable view of downtown Seattle.
- W10: Bagley Seam Trail - Trail begins at Red Town trailhead and descends a gully which has collapsed into a formerly coal-bearing seam before linking to the Red Town Trail.

== Unofficial Trails ==
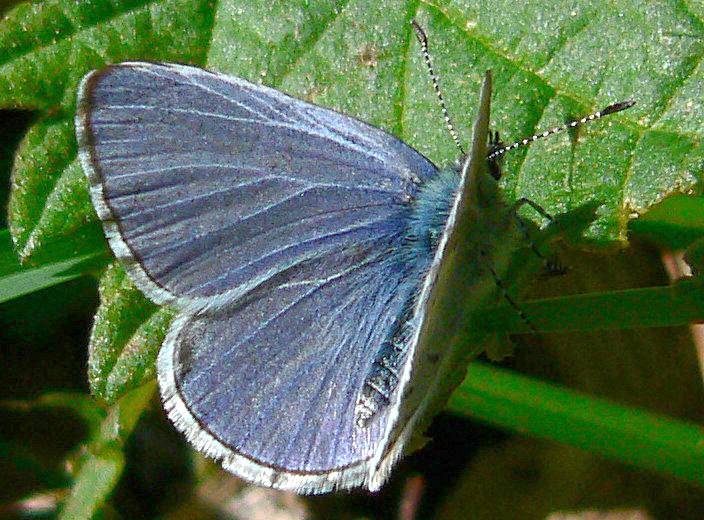
Spring Azure (Celastrina ladon) butterflies may be seen occasionally.

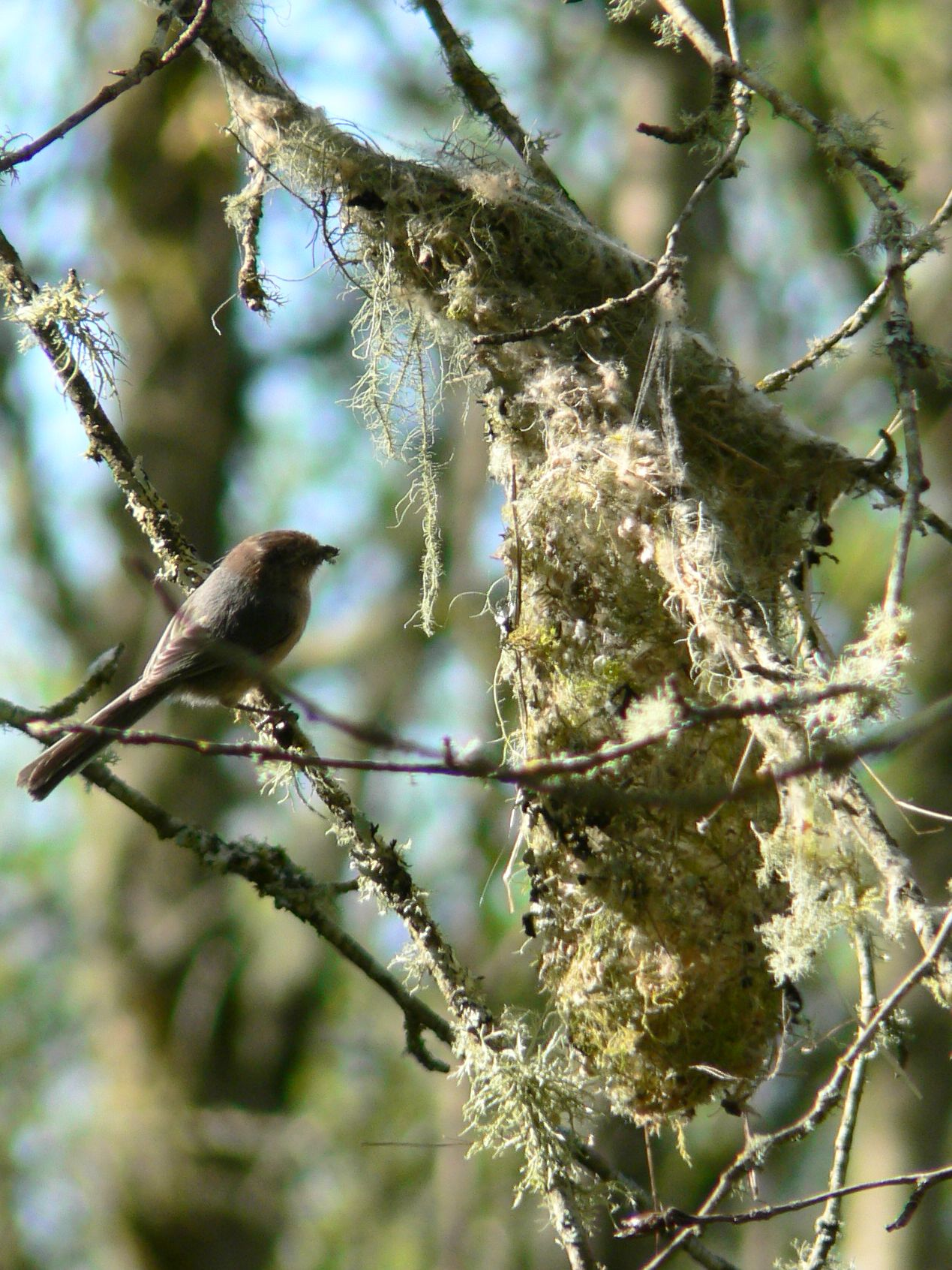
Bushtits (Psaltriparus minimus) nest in the park.

There are a few trails between the "official" ones in the park and the developed properties adjacent. Some of these trails are on non-county public property or private property unlikely to be developed due to wetness or access issues.

- Precipice Bottom Trail – The trail leaves Harvey Manning Park at Talus at a junction with the Telephone Trail and contours northward, crossing Stagecoach and Military Creeks before joining the route of the Historic Big Tree Ridge Trail and entering the King County Big Tree Ridge Trail at an undeveloped, unsigned junction.
- Precipice Trail – More a vision of Harvey Manning's than a trail, it was originally a route from a hairpin pullout on Kline Hill Road (SE 54th), contouring southeastward to cross AA Creek and join Big Tree Ridge Trail. From there, trails such as Precipice Bottom, Telephone, No Name, portions of Bear Ridge, and the (undeveloped) South Precipice were to complete a contour boundary restricting development to lands below. Presently Bob's Condo Trail (from behind Spyglass Condos on Newport Way) joins a remnant of the original Precipice Trail which passes the descending, overgrown Summerhill Ridge Trail and shortly ascends a steep, rope-assisted climb across AA Creek and its gorge where it reaches a steep bandit junction with the King County Big Tree Ridge Trail shortly before its former junction with the Historic Big Tree Ridge Trail.
- Skid Row Trail - (formerly Shruburban Trail) Starting as a barriered road a few yards south of the Big Tree Ridge trailhead on Newport Way, it ascends gently above AA Creek to cross the eastern terminus of the Telephone Trail just below Harvey Manning Park at Talus and skirts a fenced water tank to reach the top of James Bush Road, with access to Talus and SR900 at Newport Way. Its name derives both from the adjacent skid groove along the trail's central portion, and the suburbanites who formerly used its northern end to link isolated campsites with the Park and Ride 0.5 miles away.
- Telephone Trail – A regrown utility corridor running east–west parallel to the power line at the northern end of the Talus neighborhood. A disused eastern segment joins James Bush Road behind a fenced water tank and proceeds to a crossing of the Skid Row Trail just before reaching Harvey Manning Park at Talus and the Precipice Bottom Trail. Continuing westward uphill, it jogs north briefly along an old road bed, crossing AA Creek and becoming the Military Ridge Trail, which joins King County Parks trails above.
- Talus Bridge Trail – A short City of Issaquah Trail linking the southern "The Bridges" neighborhood of Talus to the Bear Ridge Trail 1 mile above its SR900 trailhead, and just below the Fantastic Erratic. The bridge across West Tibbetts Creek and benches at trail ends provide interior views; the Talus trailhead (street parking) is formally planted with a kiosk and (inaccurate) map.
- Wilderness Corridor – With the aim of leaving some of the park totally wild for the cougars, bears, deer, and other wildlife, much of the eastern portion of the park has been designated a Habitat Conservation Area. This is the area between Bear Ridge trails to the north, East Fork Trail to the west, and Shy Bear/Whittaker Wilderness Peak/Gombu Wilderness Cliffs, and Squak Mtn Connector trails to the south, and the abutting Talus Open Space to the east. Letting this large portion of the park go fallow enhances its value as an urban wildland. The park map includes the admonition "Park development and trails have been excluded to protect threatened wildlife. Please help nature's recovery by staying out of this section of the park." King County Parks and the Issaquah Alps Trails Club no longer perform maintenance on the old trails in this region, and they are no longer described in new editions of guidebooks. As of 2014, obscure trails enter the region from the east and north but their junction is overgrown as is easterly access to the Claypit.
- Lewis Creek Connector – Runs from behind a white fence with pullover parking on Newport Way at the junction of Lakemont Blvd. and Exit 13 of Interstate 90, to Peggy's Loop in City of Bellevue Lakemont Park. A rough bridge across Lewis Creek may be impassable in winter.

== Pre-park history ==
=== Cold War Nike missile site ===
Now an open field near the Sky Country Trailhead, this was an anti-aircraft Nike missile installation during the Cold War used to protect the region from nuclear attack by Soviet long range strategic bombers. All that is left from that era are a few concrete pads, landscaping features, a deteriorating chain-link fence, and an interpretive sign. Current amenities include restrooms, picnic tables, a playfield, wildlife interpretive signs, and access to the great trail system. The radar site supporting these missiles was located on Anti-Aircraft Peak one mile to the northeast where another interpretive sign provides more history of the site.

== Sources ==
- Manning, Harvey & Owen, Ralph. Hiking and Strolling the Trails of Cougar Mountain, Issaquah Alps Trails Club, Issaquah, 1991.
- McCrone, Charles. The Authoritative Guide to the Hiking Trails of Cougar Mountain Regional Wildland Park and Surrounds, Issaquah Alps Trails Club, Issaquah, 2000.
