= Cougar Mountain =

Mountain in Washington, United States

- Location within Washington (state)

Highest point
- Elevation: 1,614 ft (492 m)
- Coordinates: 47°31′13″N 122°05′36″W

Geography
- Location: Eastside King County, Washington (state), U.S.
- Parent range: Issaquah Alps

Cougar Mountain is a peak in the Issaquah Alps in King County, Washington. It is part of the highlands in the Eastside suburbs of Seattle, and at 1,614 feet (492 m) it is the lowest and westernmost of the Alps. About two-thirds of Cougar Mountain has experienced residential development, and is home to many neighborhood communities such as Lakemont. The forested heart of the hill was officially preserved by King County in June 1983 as Cougar Mountain Regional Wildland Park. Cougar Mountain is home to the Cougar Mountain Zoo.

== Geology ==
Cougar Mountain was formed in the Miocene when tectonic forces folded western Washington along a northwest axis and created the Newcastle Anticline. The anticline exposed earlier (Eocene to Oligocene) sedimentary and volcanic rocks that, due to erosion, now form the surface of Cougar Mountain. The northern edge of Cougar Mountain is distinct due to the Seattle Fault, which runs along I-90. The Seattle Fault caused a large earthquake approximately 1100 years ago.

== Ecology ==
Cougar Mountain is part of the Eastern Puget Uplands level IV ecoregion, as defined by the EPA. This ecoregion is a transition between the ecology of the Puget Sound and the forests of the Cascades. The ecology of Cougar Mountain is thus more similar to the Sammamish Plateau than the rest of the Issaquah Alps.

Cougar Mountain contains species and habitats that were once common closer to Puget Sound. Extensive logging has rendered the ecosystem less diverse than its original state.

== Views ==
The top of Cougar Mountain features views of Seattle, Mercer Island, Lake Washington and the Olympic Mountains.

== Transmitting facilities ==
Cougar Mountain is home to some of Seattle area radio station's transmitters. These include:

- KNHC 89.5
- KBCS 91.3
- KJR-FM 93.3
- KJEB 95.7
- KPLZ-FM 101.5
- KLSW 104.5
- KCMS-FM 105.3
- KRWM 106.9
- KHB60 162.550

== See also ==
- Cougar Mountain Regional Wildland Park
