= Hermiston (disambiguation) =

Hermiston is the largest city in Eastern Oregon.

Hermiston may also refer to:

- Hermiston, Edinburgh, Scotland
  - Hermiston Butte
- Weir of Hermiston (1896), an unfinished novel by Robert Louis Stevenson

== People ==
- Andrew Douglas of Hermiston (died before 1277), Scottish nobleman
- James Anderson of Hermiston (1739–1808), Scottish agriculturist, journalist and economist
- Jim Hermiston (born 1947), professional footballer and police officer
