= Hermiston, Oregon =

- City
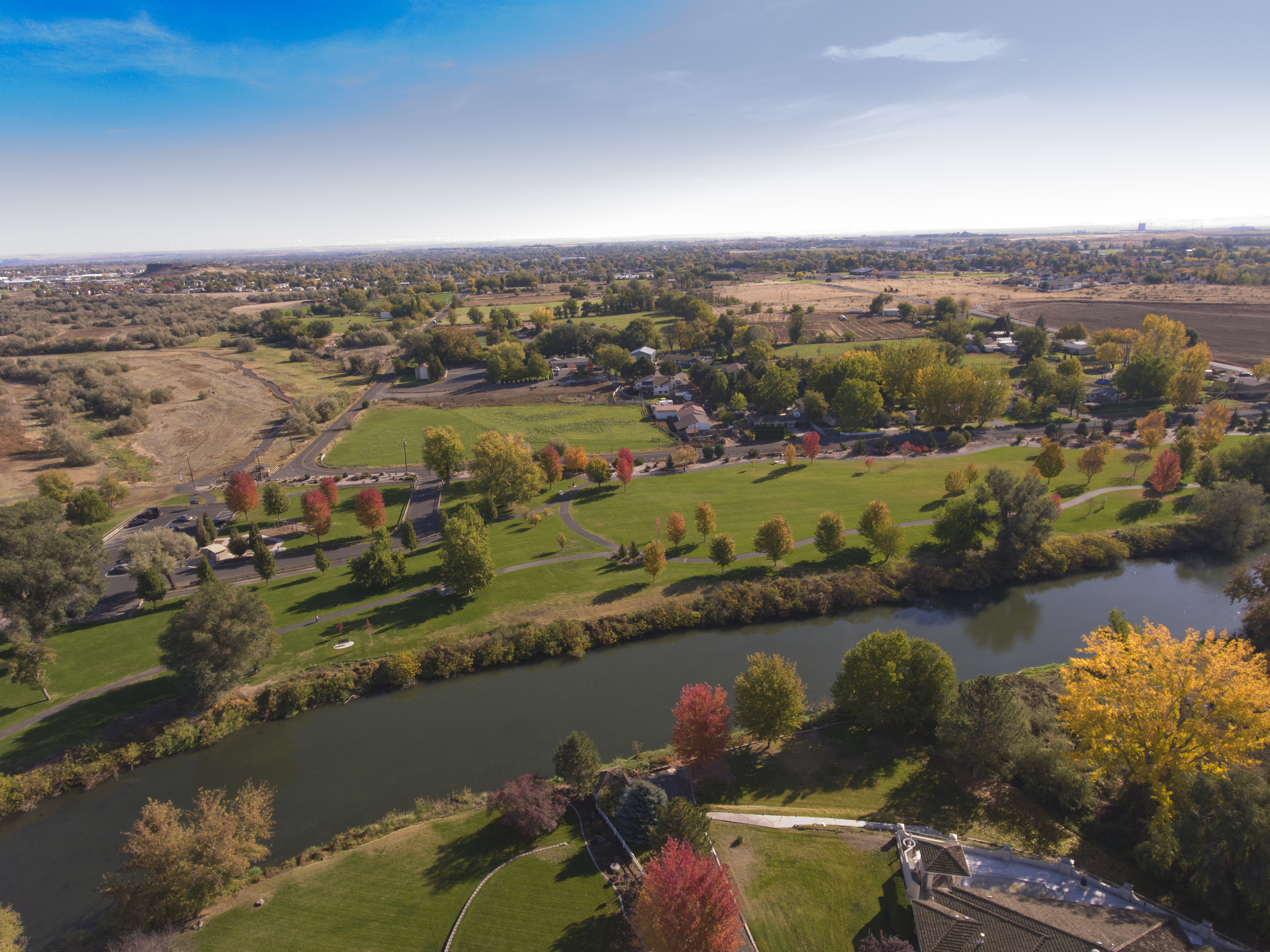
- Riverfront Park & Umatilla River
- Etymology: Hermiston, Edinburgh (district of capital of Scotland)
- Motto: "Where life is sweet."
- Location in Oregon
- Coordinates: 45°49′58″N 119°17′06″W
- Country: United States
- State: Oregon
- County: Umatilla
- Incorporated: 1907

Government
  - Type: Council-Manager

Area
  - City: 8.43 sq mi (21.83 km^{2})
  - Land: 8.43 sq mi (21.83 km^{2})
  - Water: 0 sq mi (0.00 km^{2})
- Elevation: 482 ft (147 m)

Population (2020)
  - City: 19,354
  - Density: 2,296/sq mi (886.5/km^{2})
  - Metro: 92,261
- Demonym: Hermistonian
- Time zone: UTC-8 (Pacific)
  - Summer (DST): UTC-7 (Pacific)
- ZIP code: 97838
- Area code: 541
- FIPS code: 41-33700
- GNIS feature ID: 2410748
- Website: www.hermiston.gov

Hermiston (/ˈhɜːrməstən/) is a city in Umatilla County, Oregon, United States. Its population of 20,322 makes it the largest city in Eastern Oregon. Hermiston is the largest and fastest-growing city in the Hermiston-Pendleton Micropolitan Statistical Area, the eighth largest Core Based Statistical Area in Oregon with a combined population of 92,261 at the 2020 census. Hermiston sits near the junction of I-82 and I-84, and is 7 miles (11 km) south of the Columbia River, the Washington state line, Lake Wallula, and the McNary Dam. The Hermiston area has become a hub for logistics and data center activity due to the proximity of the I-82 and I-84 interchange, Pacific Northwest fiber-optic backbone, and low power costs.

== History ==
The historic inhabitants of the area were the indigenous Umatilla, Cayuse, Walla Walla, and Columbia Indians, descendants of peoples who lived in this area for thousands of years. The earliest European settlers established a mission near Pendleton in 1847. The territorial government organized Umatilla County in 1862 from the larger Wasco County.

Hermiston's early development was plagued by rivalry between The Maxwell Land & Irrigation Company and developers Skinner & Newport, who both fought to establish their own town of Hermiston in the exact same spot, centrally located in the irrigation district along the Oregon Railway and Navigation Company's main line. While Maxwell was able to secure the train depot on the West side of the tracks, initially naming it after themselves, Skinner & Newport filed their own Hermiston plat directly across the tracks in November 1904, beating the Maxwell Company's filing by two days. With neither side willing to cede to the other, two separate business districts formed on either side of the tracks, Hermiston Avenue on the West side and East Main street (there is no West Main Street) on the East side, defiantly placed one block off so they didn't align. Each district featured its own bank, hotel and mercantile but East Main Street would eventually win out.

The rival developers eventually settled their differences and on July 10, 1907, the two towns were incorporated as a single Hermiston. Colonel J. F. McNaught, an early settler in the region, is credited with originally coming up with the Hermiston name, which was taken from Robert Louis Stevenson's unfinished novel Weir of Hermiston.

The greater Hermiston region began to see irrigated agriculture in 1908, with the completion of the U.S. Bureau of Reclamation's Umatilla Basin Project in the form of Cold Springs Reservoir. The region saw modest growth until the outbreak of World War II, when the Umatilla Army Depot was constructed, causing Hermiston's population to jump from 803 at the 1940 US Census to 3,804 in 1950. The region continued to experience modest growth for the next several decades until the 1970s, when low power costs coupled with the development of center-pivot irrigation resulted in a significant expansion in agricultural acreage put into potato production. The expansion of potato production coincided with the development of large potato processing plants by Lamb-Weston and Simplot, focusing on frozen potato products. The associated economic development drove Hermiston's population to nearly double from 4,893 in 1970 to 9,408 by 1980. The 1990s brought additional large employment developments to the Hermiston region in the form of Two Rivers Correctional Institution, a Wal-Mart Distribution Center, expansion of the Union Pacific Hinkle Rail Yard, and the beginning of the Umatilla Army Depot's Chemical Weapon Incineration process. The 2000s have seen continued growth and diversification of the regional economy as Hermiston has grown to a population of 19,354 at the 2020 Census and has become a regional center for commercial and professional services.

The city is also known for its watermelons, which are part of its branding.

== Economy ==
=== Retail ===
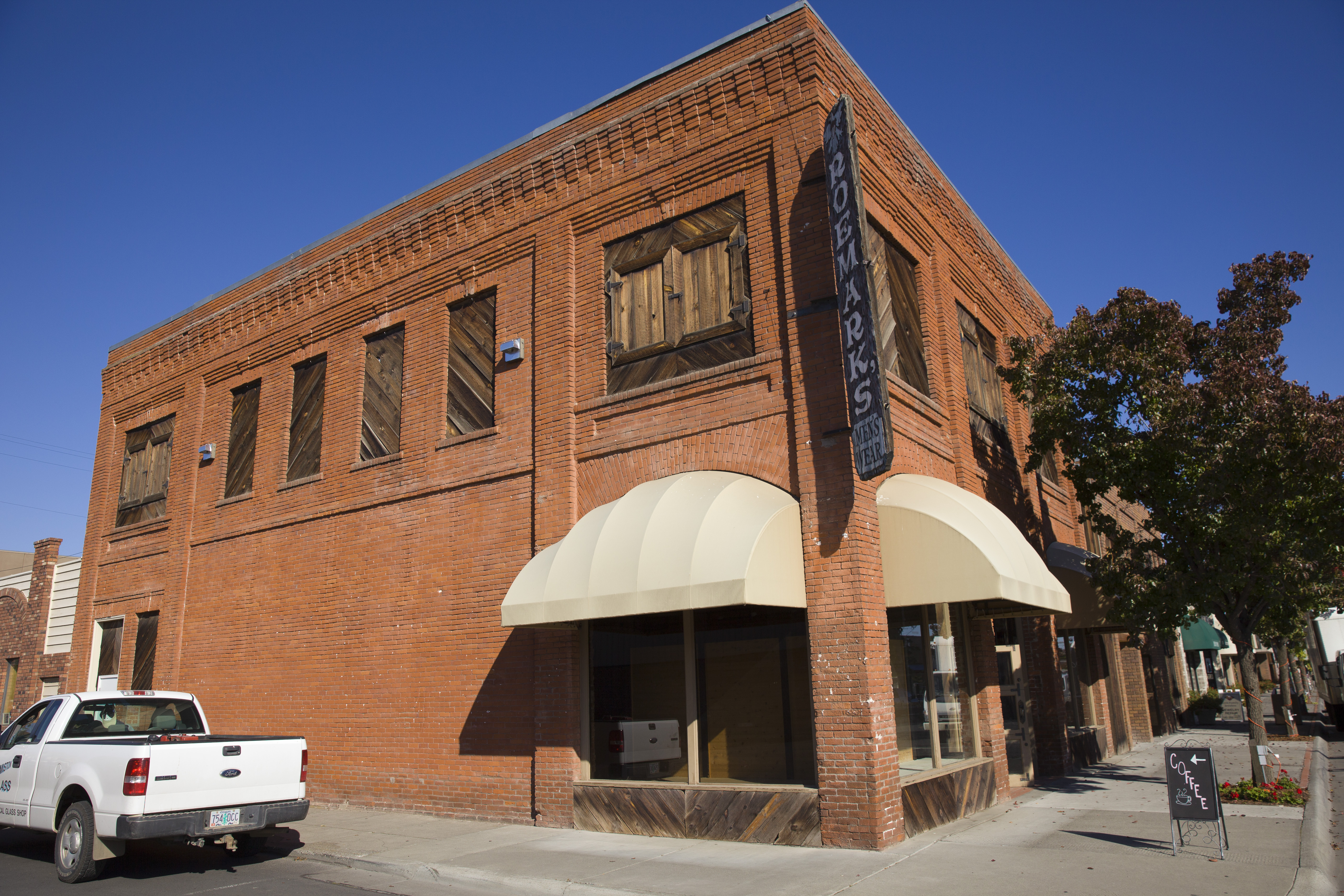
Downtown Hermiston

Hermiston serves as the retail and services center for much of western Umatilla County, as well as Morrow County and parts of Gilliam county. Hermiston's Local Trade Area, which describes the area where people will travel to purchase items weekly, stretches from Pendleton on the East, the Columbia River to the North, Heppner to the South, and Gilliam County to the West. 46,000 people were living within Hermiston's Local Trade Area according to the 2010 U.S. Census data. Despite a relatively robust local retail & services market, Hermiston experiences significant retail sales leakage to the Tri-Cities for items purchased on less than a weekly basis. The Tri-Cities, located approximately 30 minutes north of Hermiston in Washington, had a metro-area population of 275,740 as of April 1, 2014, making it the fourth largest metropolitan area in Washington.

=== Workforce ===
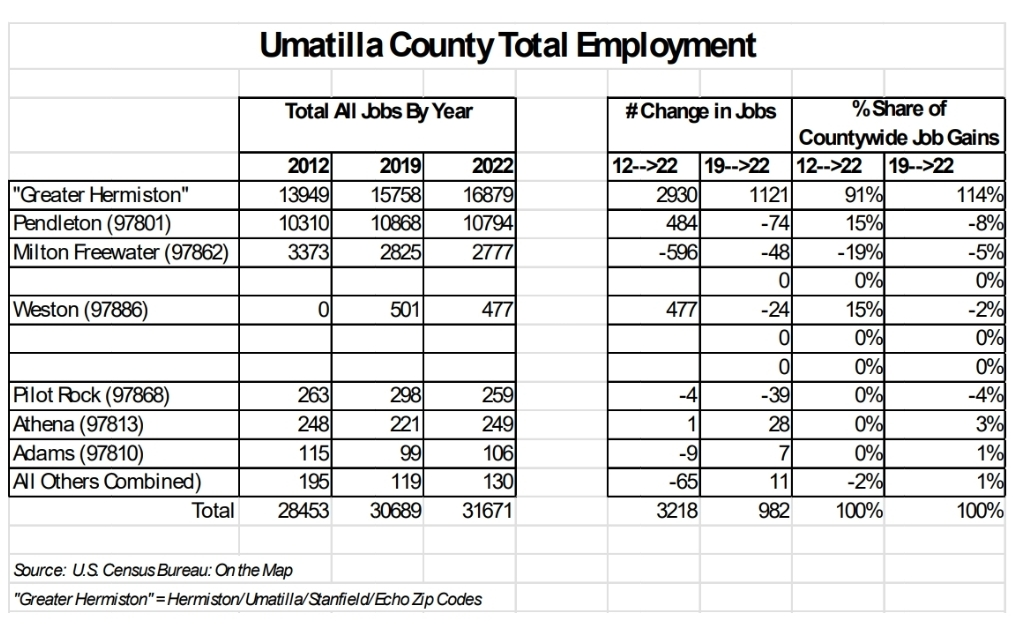
Umatilla County Employment 2012-2022

The Greater Hermiston area, which encompasses the Hermiston, Umatilla, Stanfield, and Echo ZIP codes, and equates to a less than 10-minute commuting distance, has seen strong job growth since 2012. The Hermiston area added 2,930 jobs from 2012 to 2022, which equates to 91% of all net job growth in Umatilla County over that time. More recently, Greater Hermiston accounted for 114% of Umatilla County job gains from 2019 to 2022 as a result of 1,121 jobs added compared to net losses of 74 and 48 jobs in Pendleton and Milton-Freewater respectively.

Hermiston has the largest 30-mile radius workforce in Eastern Oregon. According to 2022 U.S. Census estimates, there were 144,664 people actively employed and living within a 30-mile radius of Hermiston; in comparison, there are 101,119 in the next-largest 30-mile regional Labor Shed in Bend. Hermiston-area employers benefit greatly from the proximity of the Tri-Cities in Washington which, based on light traffic, and easy freeway access, is approximately 30–35 minutes to the north of Hermiston. This proximity also allows dual-income households good access to employment opportunities for both wage earners.

=== Top employers ===
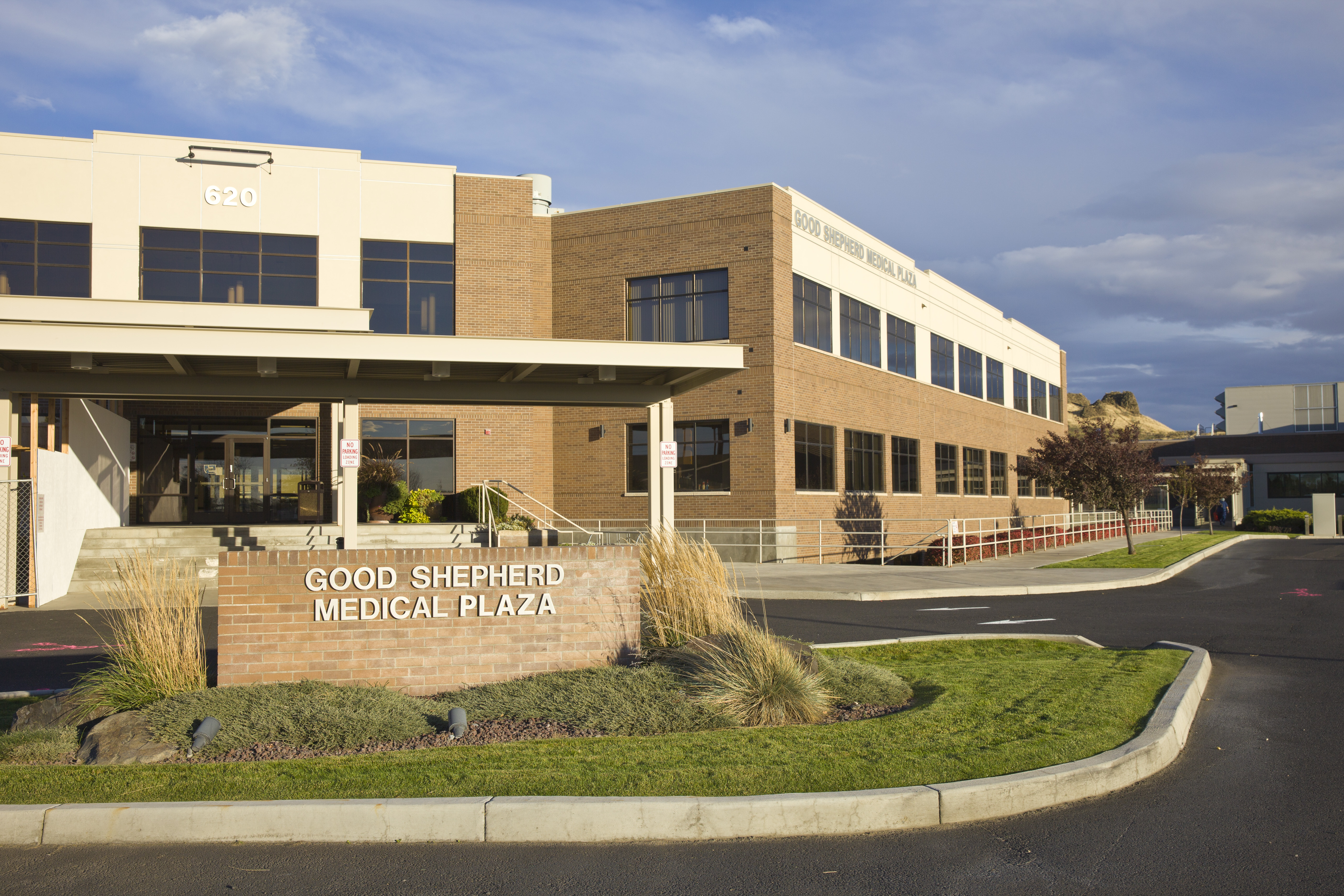
Good Shepherd Medical Plaza

According to the City of Hermiston's 2022 Comprehensive Annual Financial Report, the top employers in the area are:

#	Employer	# of Employees
1	Amazon Web Services	2,058
2	Good Shepherd Healthcare System	1,107
3	Wal-Mart Distribution Center	1,050
4	First Coast Security	1,000
5	Hermiston School District	623
6	Lamb Weston - Hermiston	545
7	Two Rivers Correctional Institution	440
8	Wal-Mart Supercenter	356
9	Union Pacific Railroad	300
10	Marlette Homes	300

== Parks ==
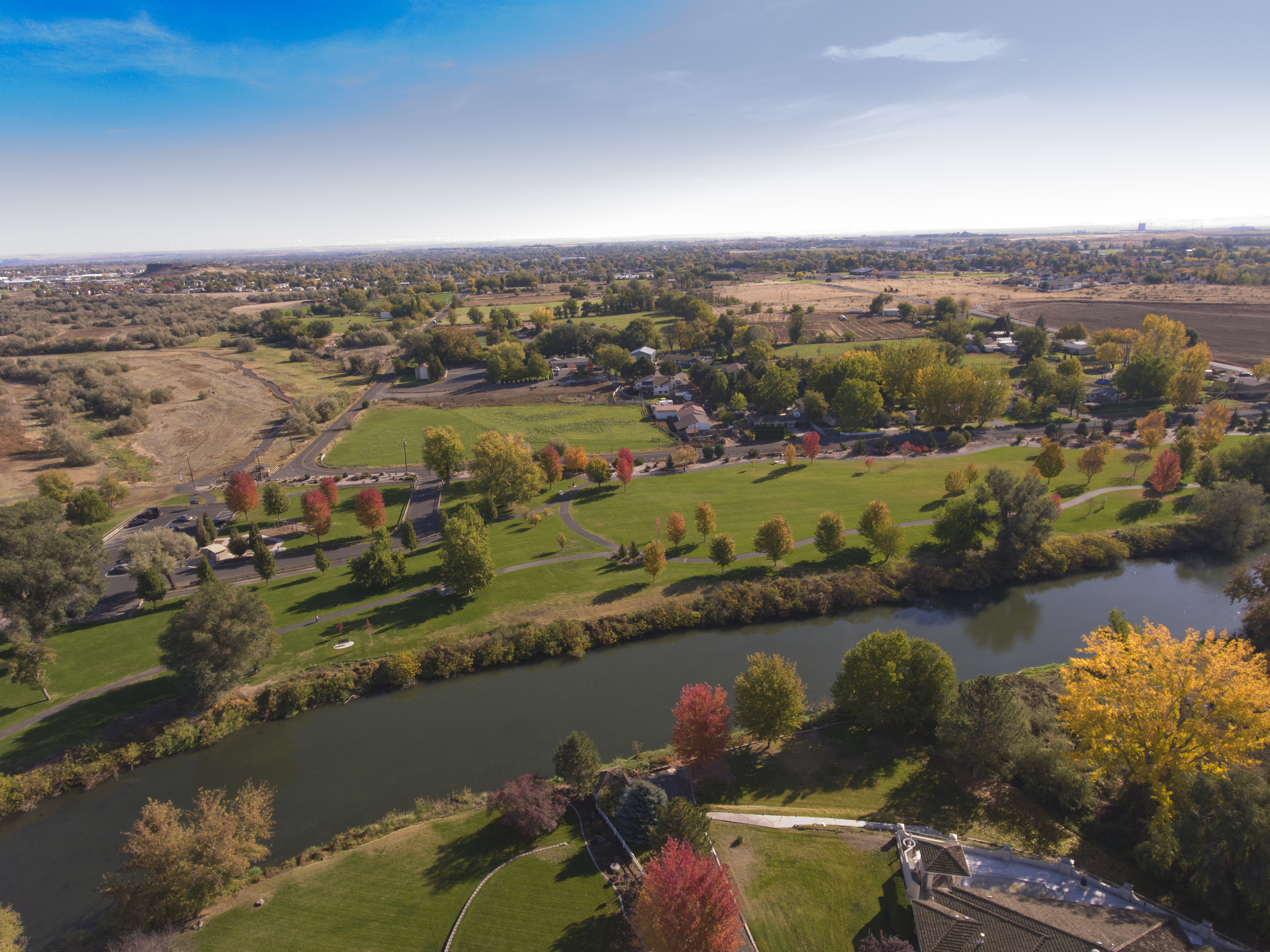
Riverfront Park features open grassy space, and access to more than 2 miles of paved walking trails.

The City of Hermiston Parks Department maintains 15 parks, 15 landscape areas, and 100-plus acres for the enjoyment of the community. In addition to the developed parks, the department also has 50 additional acres planned for future development. Recent major enhancements include the additions of Riverfront Park, the Oxbow Trail, and continual additions to the Hermiston Family Aquatic Center. Riverfront Park features 16 acres of open grassy areas alongside the Umatilla River, as well as nearly a mile of paved walking paths, with picnic shelters, restrooms, and fishing access. A 1.8-mile paved walking path, named the Oxbow Trail, was added in 2015 to connect Riverfront Park with the north side of town near Good Shepherd Medical Center. The Trail winds through a protected wetland area for nearly the entirety of its length and also connects to Harrison Park.

== Geography ==
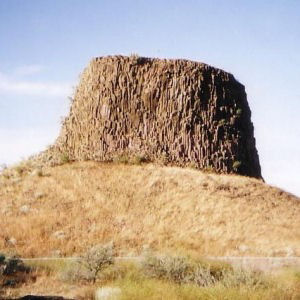
Hat Rock, located on the Columbia River near Hermiston, was one of the first landmarks of the area noted by Lewis and Clark in their journals.

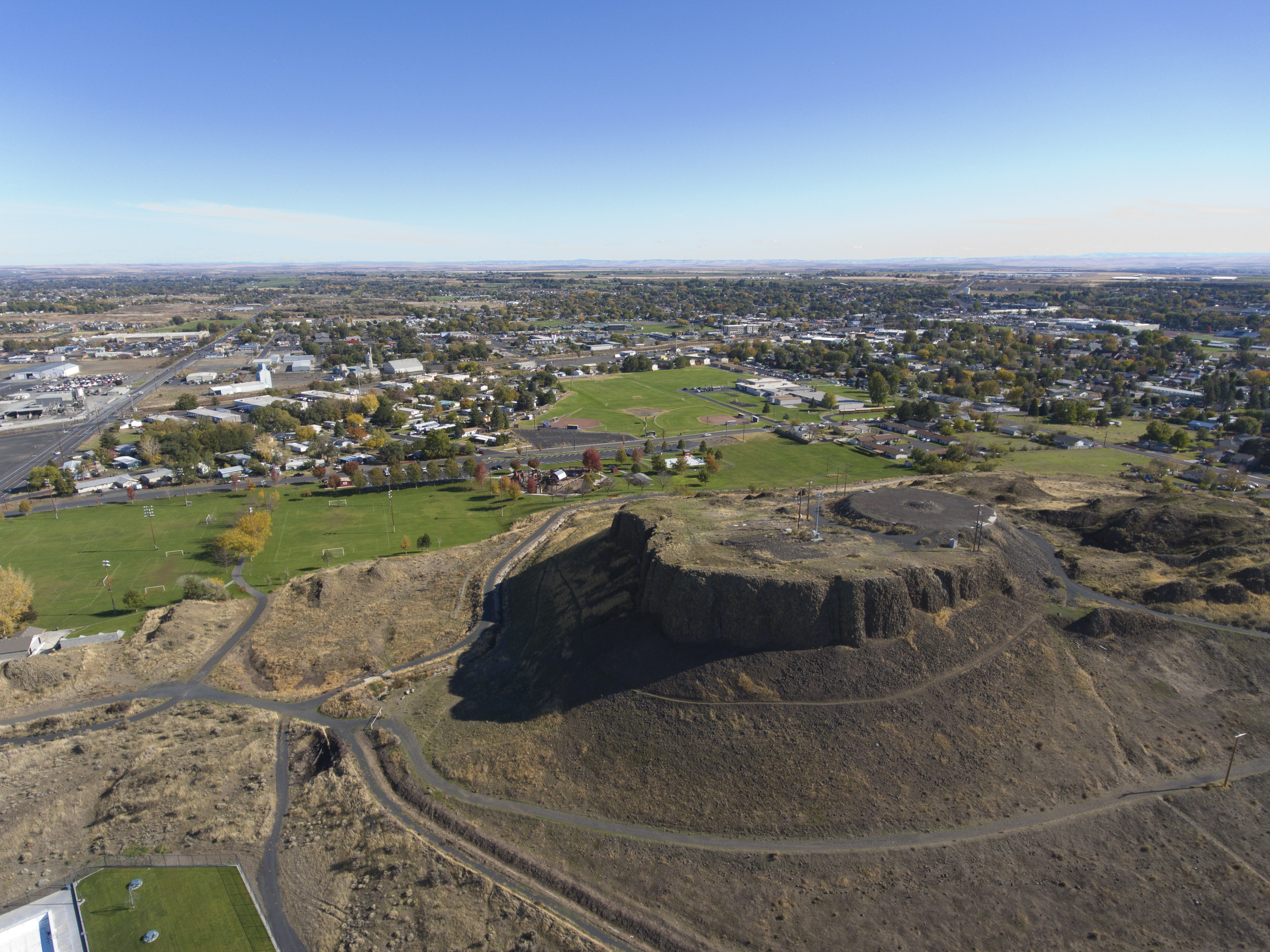
The Hermiston Butte features several easy hiking trails accessible from Butte Park, the Hermiston Family Aquatic Center, and Good Shepherd Medical Center

According to the United States Census Bureau, the city has a total area of 7.81 square miles (20.23 km^{2}), all land.

Distance to major cities:

- Tri-Cities, Washington - 30 to 45 miles (48 to 72 km)
- Portland, Oregon - 181 miles (291 km)
- Seattle, Washington - 259 miles (417 km)
- Spokane, Washington - 204 miles (328 km)
- Boise, Idaho - 259 miles (417 km)
- Salt Lake City, Utah - 587 miles (945 km)
- Missoula, Montana - 367 miles (591 km)

Hermiston's recent population growth is due to its proximity to large cities in the Pacific Northwest and its location along two major freeways.

=== Climate ===
According to the Köppen climate classification system, Hermiston has a steppe climate (Köppen BSk). This gives the area hot dry summers with high daytime temperatures that cool considerably overnight, and relatively cold winters which typically yield several snowstorms per year with relatively minimal accumulation. On June 29, 2021, a max temperature of 118 °F (48 °C) was recorded in Hermiston, which is just one degree below the new record high temperature for the State of Oregon, which was set at the nearby Pelton Dam, which is also in Jefferson County, on the same day.

Climate data for (Hermiston Municipal Airport), Oregon, 1991–2020 normals, extremes 1898, 1998–present
Month	Jan	Feb	Mar	Apr	May	Jun	Jul	Aug	Sep	Oct	Nov	Dec	Year
Record high °F (°C)	68 (20)	71 (22)	79 (26)	90 (32)	100 (38)	118 (48)	119 (48)	110 (43)	100 (38)	88 (31)	78 (26)	72 (22)	119 (48)
Mean maximum °F (°C)	59.5 (15.3)	61.7 (16.5)	70.0 (21.1)	81.3 (27.4)	93.2 (34.0)	99.1 (37.3)	104.9 (40.5)	102.8 (39.3)	93.3 (34.1)	79.2 (26.2)	69.3 (20.7)	61.3 (16.3)	106.2 (41.2)
Mean daily maximum °F (°C)	43.3 (6.3)	49.4 (9.7)	59.1 (15.1)	66.6 (19.2)	76.2 (24.6)	82.2 (27.9)	92.7 (33.7)	91.0 (32.8)	81.2 (27.3)	66.5 (19.2)	50.7 (10.4)	42.1 (5.6)	66.8 (19.3)
Daily mean °F (°C)	36.0 (2.2)	39.3 (4.1)	46.4 (8.0)	52.8 (11.6)	61.2 (16.2)	67.6 (19.8)	75.6 (24.2)	73.9 (23.3)	64.6 (18.1)	52.7 (11.5)	41.5 (5.3)	35.2 (1.8)	53.9 (12.2)
Mean daily minimum °F (°C)	28.7 (−1.8)	29.2 (−1.6)	33.7 (0.9)	38.9 (3.8)	46.3 (7.9)	53.0 (11.7)	58.6 (14.8)	56.8 (13.8)	47.9 (8.8)	39.0 (3.9)	32.3 (0.2)	28.2 (−2.1)	41.1 (5.1)
Mean minimum °F (°C)	10.8 (−11.8)	12.3 (−10.9)	18.1 (−7.7)	24.8 (−4.0)	31.5 (−0.3)	41.6 (5.3)	45.3 (7.4)	44.5 (6.9)	34.7 (1.5)	22.6 (−5.2)	13.8 (−10.1)	7.8 (−13.4)	−1.0 (−18.3)
Record low °F (°C)	−12 (−24)	−1 (−18)	0 (−18)	16 (−9)	24 (−4)	38 (3)	38 (3)	38 (3)	26 (−3)	7 (−14)	−8 (−22)	−16 (−27)	−16 (−27)
Average precipitation inches (mm)	1.14 (29)	0.86 (22)	0.77 (20)	0.78 (20)	0.83 (21)	0.64 (16)	0.12 (3.0)	0.17 (4.3)	0.33 (8.4)	0.80 (20)	1.05 (27)	1.12 (28)	8.61 (219)
Average precipitation days (≥ 0.01 in)	9.5	8.4	8.3	6.5	7.7	5.3	1.5	1.9	2.8	7.5	10.3	10.5	80.2
Source 1: NOAA
Source 2: National Weather Service (mean maxima/minima 2006–2020)

== Demographics ==
Historical population
Census	Pop.	Note	%±
1910	647		—
1920	647		0.0%
1930	608		−6.0%
1940	803		32.1%
1950	3,804		373.7%
1960	4,402		15.7%
1970	4,893		11.2%
1980	9,408		92.3%
1990	10,040		6.7%
2000	13,154		31.0%
2010	16,745		27.3%
2020	19,354		15.6%

=== 2023 Portland State University Estimates ===
Portland State University's Population Research Center (PRC) provides the official annual population estimates for cities and counties to the State of Oregon for the purposes of state shared funding allocations. PSU's 2023 Certified Population Estimate for Hermiston was 20,322. Due to the PRC's more detailed analysis, these estimates have proven more accurate than the U.S. Census Bureau's annual estimates.

=== 2020 census ===
As of the 2020 census, Hermiston had a population of 19,354. The count represented a gain of 2,609 residents since the 2010 census and surpassed the Census Bureau's 2019 estimate of 17,782, mirroring the way the 2010 tally exceeded the 2009 estimate.

The median age was 31.2 years, 30.3% of residents were under the age of 18, and 12.9% of residents were 65 years of age or older; for every 100 females there were 96.8 males, and among those age 18 and over there were 94.4 males for every 100 females.

99.2% of residents lived in urban areas, while 0.8% lived in rural areas.

There were 6,656 households in Hermiston, of which 41.7% had children under the age of 18 living in them. Of all households, 45.0% were married-couple households, 17.9% were households with a male householder and no spouse or partner present, and 27.3% were households with a female householder and no spouse or partner present. About 23.9% of all households were made up of individuals and 9.8% had someone living alone who was 65 years of age or older.

There were 6,962 housing units, of which 4.4% were vacant. Among occupied housing units, 54.8% were owner-occupied and 45.2% were renter-occupied. The homeowner vacancy rate was 1.6% and the rental vacancy rate was 3.4%.

Racial composition as of the 2020 census
Race	Number	Percentage
White	10,876	56.2%
Black or African American	129	0.7%
American Indian and Alaska Native	304	1.6%
Asian	284	1.5%
Native Hawaiian and Other Pacific Islander	62	0.3%
Some other race	4,392	22.7%
Two or more races	3,307	17.1%
Hispanic or Latino (of any race)	8,555	44.2%

=== 2010 census ===
As of the census of 2010, there were 16,745 people, 6,050 households, and 4,184 families residing in the city. The population density was 2,144.0 inhabitants per square mile (827.8/km^{2}). There were 6,373 housing units at an average density of 816.0 units per square mile (315.1 units/km^{2}). The racial makeup of the city was 74.2% White, 0.8% African American, 1.3% Native American, 1.5% Asian, 0.2% Pacific Islander, 19.0% from other races, and 3.0% from two or more races. Hispanic or Latino of any race were 34.9% of the population.

There were 6,050 households, of which 42.0% had children under the age of 18 living with them, 47.9% were married couples living together, 14.5% had a female householder with no husband present, 6.8% had a male householder with no wife present, and 30.8% were non-families. 25.8% of all households were made up of individuals, and 9.9% had someone living alone who was 65 years of age or older. The average household size was 2.74 and the average family size was 3.28.

The median age in the city was 30.9 years. 31.7% of residents were under the age of 18; 9.2% were between the ages of 18 and 24; 27.3% were from 25 to 44; 20.8% were from 45 to 64; and 11% were 65 years of age or older. The gender makeup of the city was 49.4% male and 50.6% female.

== Education ==
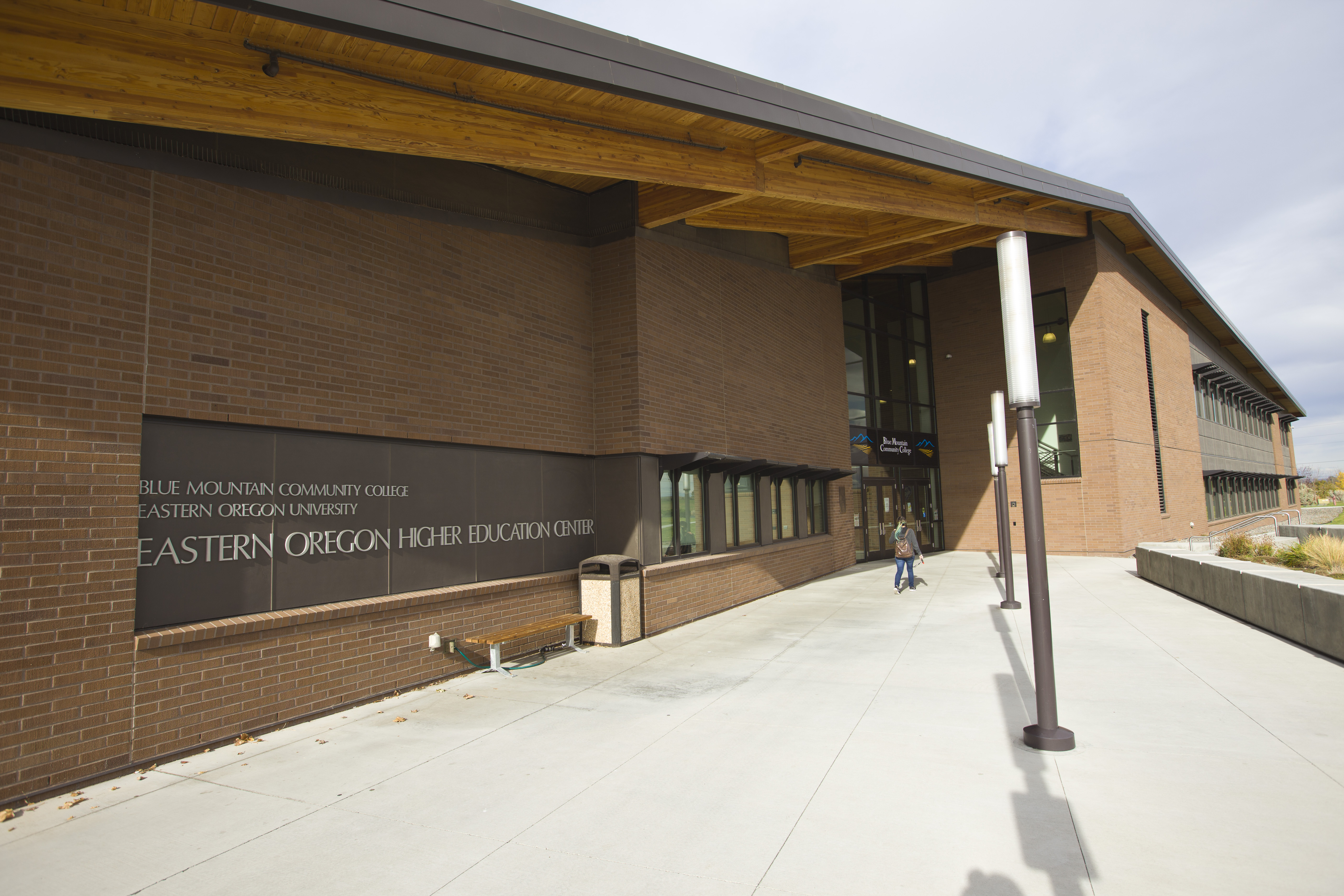
Eastern Oregon Higher Education Center- Hermiston

=== K-12 ===
Hermiston School District is the largest district in Eastern Oregon, with 5,508 students in the 2020–21 school year. The district has one high school, Hermiston High School, which hosts 1,703 students. Due to the school's size, it is able to offer comprehensive programming and courses for all students. The district is also composed of two middle schools and six elementary schools. There are also two private schools in Hermiston.

Voters in the Hermiston School District have shown strong support for education as the district has experienced sustained robust enrollment growth. Voters approved a $69.9 million capital construction bond in November 2008, and another $82.7 million capital construction bond in November 2019. The 2019 bond added a new elementary school near the intersection of NE 10th and Theater Lane, and replaced the 57-year-old Rocky Heights Elementary School on-site with a larger facility. The 2019 bond will also add capacity for an additional 200 students at Hermiston High School.

Hermiston School District Facility Inventory By Age
School	Construction Year
Loma Vista Elementary	2022
Rocky Heights Elementary (Rebuild)	2022
Armand Larive Middle	2011
Sunset Elementary	2011
West Park Elementary	2010
Desert View Elementary	2001
Sandstone Middle	1995
Hermiston High	1992/2001
Highland Hills Elementary	1980

==== High school sports ====
Hermiston High School competes at the 3A level in the Washington Interscholastic Activities Association. This cross-state membership was approved by the WIAA in 2017 in recognition of the lack of comparably sized large high schools elsewhere in Eastern Oregon. The second largest High School in Eastern Oregon was Pendleton, with only 815 students, compared to Hermiston's 1,703. The WIAA membership allows HHS to compete in the Mid-Columbia Conference against high schools from Kennewick, Richland, Pasco, and Walla Walla, Washington and significantly reduce travel times for conference games.

=== Higher education ===
Blue Mountain Community College has a branch in Hermiston. Eastern Oregon University also hosts undergraduate and graduate-level courses at the Eastern Oregon Higher Education Center in Hermiston.

== Transportation ==
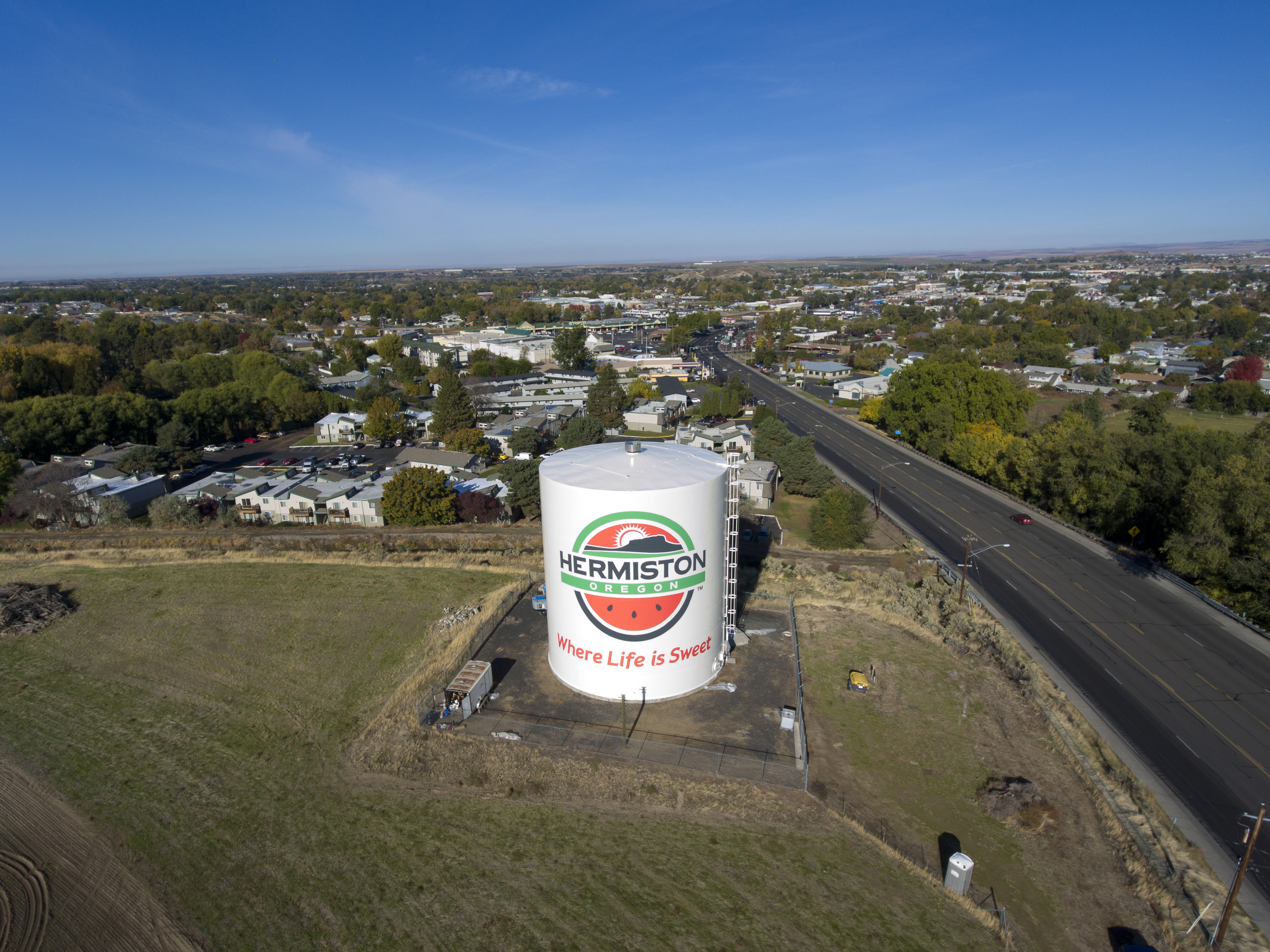
US Highway 395 entering Hermiston

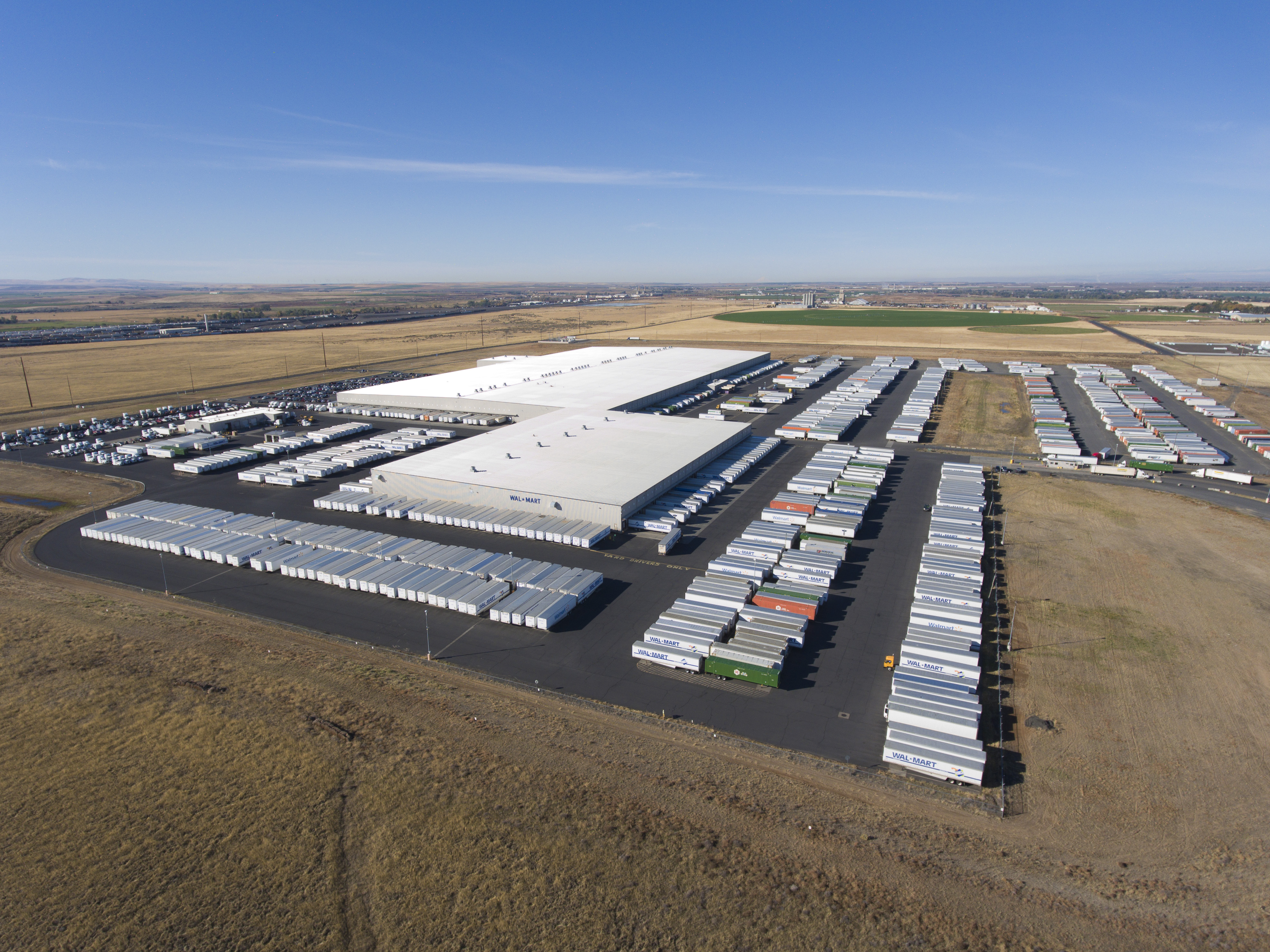
Wal-Mart's 1.2 million Square Foot Northwest Distribution Center in Hermiston.

=== Highways and roads ===
Hermiston benefits from being near the exact center of the Pacific Northwest and at the crossroads of several major interstate highways. Drivers can easily access all four major Northwest metropolitan areas in just a half-day's drive. Portland is less than 3 hours to the West, and drivers can also reach Spokane in less than 3 hours to the northeast, while Seattle and Boise are both approximately 4 hours away to the northwest and southeast, respectively. Highways serving Hermiston include Interstate 84 and U.S. Route 30, both of which run east–west, U.S. Route 395, which runs north–south, and Interstate 82, which has its southern terminus near Hermiston and continues north to Ellensburg, Washington.

Major transportation-related businesses in Hermiston include Wal-Mart's Northwest Distribution Center, and both FedEx and United Parcel Service (UPS) have freight distribution facilities in Hermiston.

=== Rail ===
Hermiston is on the La Grande Subdivision of the Union Pacific Railroad, constructed originally through the area in the 1870s as the Oregon Railroad and Navigation Company. Railroad facilities include the Hinkle Locomotive Service and Repair Facility and "hump yard" located just outside the city.

=== Airports ===
Hermiston Municipal Airport is a city-owned airport serving General Aviation pilots, corporate jet traffic, agricultural operations, and cargo operations. There are currently no commercial flights out of Hermiston.

Tri-Cities Airport is located approximately 40 minutes north of Hermiston, and offers commercial flights to Seattle, Salt Lake City, Denver, Minneapolis, Las Vegas, Portland, San Francisco, and Phoenix. In 2014, due to strong growth in demand, the Port of Pasco approved a $42 million renovation and expansion that will double the size of the current terminal.

== Media ==
=== Radio ===
- KOHU 1360 AM (Country)
- KQFM 93.7 FM (AC)
- KLKY 96.1 FM (Classic Rock) - Licensed to Stanfield, Oregon
- KZLY 99.5 FM (Spanish)
- KGTS 91.3 FM (Christian)
- KOLH 105.9 FM (Catholic - EWTN Radio)

=== Newspapers ===
- The Hermiston Herald (online-only)
- East Oregonian (Pendleton paper with coverage of Hermiston, published weekly)

== Notable people ==
- Tucker Bounds, public relations professional
- Bucky Jacobsen, baseball player
- Chuck Norris, politician
- Shoni Schimmel, basketball player
- Jim Stuart, football player
- Jared Zabransky, football player

== Annual events ==
- Hermiston Raceway/Super Oval, 3/8-mile (0.6 km) paved oval stock car track, races almost every Saturday from late April through the end of September every year.
- Farm City Pro Rodeo, annual rodeo held in August
- Umatilla County Fair

== See also ==
- Hermiston Butte
- Hat Rock State Park
- Oregon Route 207
