= LGD =

LGD may refer to:

- Loss given default
- La Grande/Union County Airport, Oregon, US, FAA identifier
- Livestock guardian dog
- Lingwood railway station, Norfolk, England, National Rail station code
- Lab-grown diamond
- Local government district (disambiguation)
- LG Display
