= Hinkle, Oregon =

Unincorporated community in the state of Oregon, United States

- Unincorporated community
- Location within the state of Oregon
- Coordinates: 45°47′47″N 119°18′44″W
- Country: United States
- State: Oregon
- County: Umatilla
- Elevation: 620 ft (190 m)
- Time zone: UTC-8 (Pacific (PST))
  - Summer (DST): UTC-7 (PDT)
- Area codes: 458 and 541
- GNIS feature ID: 1136381

Hinkle is an unincorporated community along the Umatilla River in northwestern Umatilla County, Oregon, United States. It is south of Hermiston, near Interstate 84/U.S. Route 30 and Oregon Route 207, within the Pendleton–Hermiston Micropolitan Statistical Area. It is the site of the Union Pacific Railroad's (UP) Hinkle Locomotive Service and Repair Facility, part of the Hinkle Freight Classification Yard.

== History ==
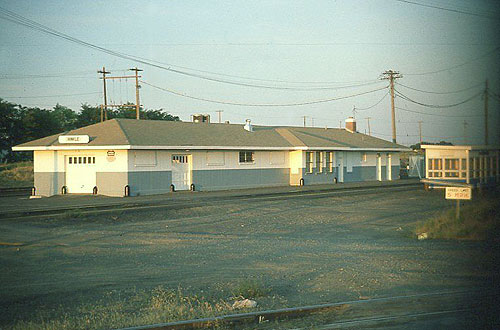
The former Hinkle Amtrak station, September 1982

Hinkle was a railway junction where a cutoff to Boardman rejoined the main line of the Oregon Railway & Navigation Company that ran from Umatilla to Huntington. When the cutoff was built in 1915, a station was needed at the junction with the main line, and Joseph T. Hinkle, a prominent local attorney, newspaper editor and politician, sold the railroad a small amount of land for that purpose. The station was named in his honor. According to the compilers of Oregon Geographic Names, the community of Hinkle "languished in obscurity for a third of a century", until 1951, when the completion of the McNary Dam flooded the former route of the UP's line. When the tracks were relocated, UP built a major yard at the junction, expanding it beginning in 1976.

From 1977 until 1997, Hinkle was a passenger stop on Amtrak's Pioneer route; the station code was HIK. Hinkle was previously a stop on the UP's City of Portland route, with connections to Chicago.

== See also ==
- List of cities and unincorporated communities in Oregon
