= Hermiston School District =

Public school district in Oregon

Hermiston School District 8R

Location
- City of Hermiston Oregon United States

District information
- Type: Public
- Grades: Pre K-12
- Established: 1951; 75 years ago
- Superintendent: Tricia Mooney
- Schools: 10

Students and staff
- Students: 5,809
- Teachers: 300 (2017)
- Staff: 600 (2018)

Other information
- Teachers' unions: Oregon Education Association
- Website: hermiston.k12.or.us

Hermiston School District 8R is a public school district in Hermiston, Oregon, United States. For the beginning of the 2019–2020 academic year, enrollment totaled 5,809 students in Pre-K through 12th grades with one high school, Hermiston High School, two middle schools, and five elementary schools. Founded in the early 1900s, the school district covers the Hermiston proper bordering with the Umatilla School District to the West and the Stanfield District to the East.

== History ==
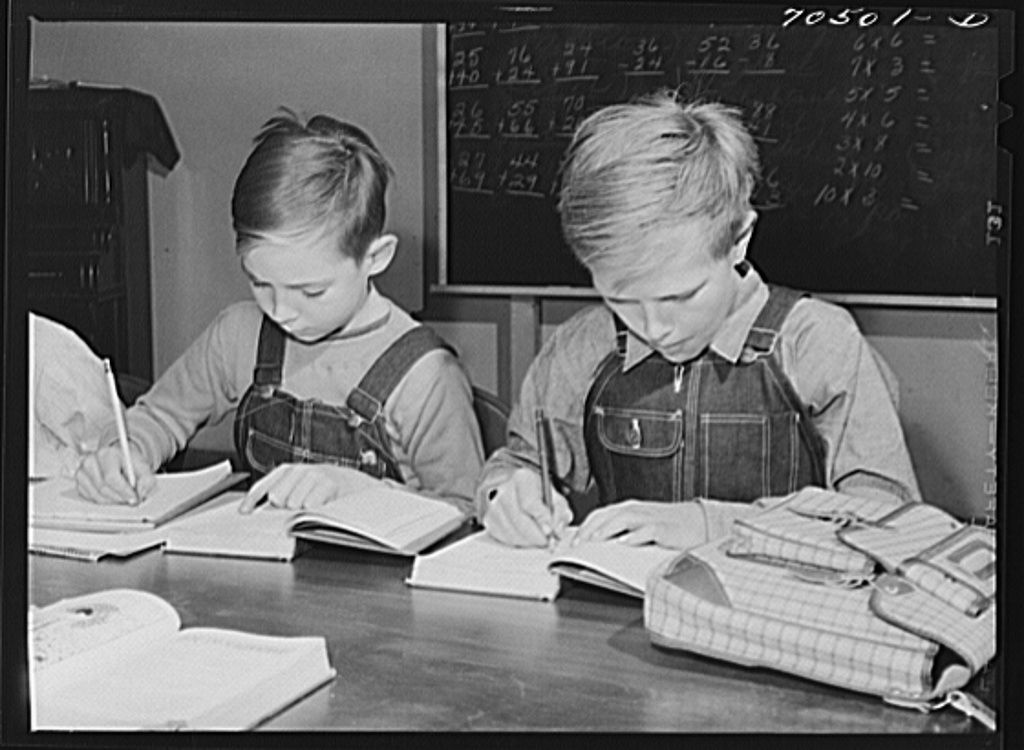
Children in an improvised school at a Hermiston church basement, 1941

The children of the first homestead settlers of Hermiston went to school in two rooms at the Carperter's Hall basement on current East Main street. Hermiston was founded in 1904 and incorporated in 1907. Compulsory education established a school in the Sandstone Building and functioning that year. Located on Ridgeway Ave, the school hosted both grade school and high school. It was later expanded and a new building was approved for a high school in 1937. With the growth of the community related to the building of the Ordnance Depot, the Locust school was erected and the Ordnance School established as a day nursery for the workers' children and later taken for school use. Students attended in one of two groups, half in the morning, the remaining in the afternoon school. Other buildings in the community were also used as temporary schoolhouses, prominently churches. At that time, the Hermiston Union High School was relocated and the Armand Larive Middle School populated the old high school building.

=== School Buildings ===
After the migration during the building of the McNary Dam, the new high school building was expanded in 1946 and later in 1954. The building was eventually demolished. The high school received a new building in 1954 which was expanded in 1968 and 1992 and rebuilt in the summer of 2002 which almost entirely replaced the one structure built in the same location in the 1930s. The Armand Larive Middle School also received a new building.

In October 2008, the District put forward a $69.9 million, twenty-year bond measure to retire previous bonds and respond to concerns of aging infrastructure, enrollment growth and quality learning environments. The bond measure was approved by a majority of district voters. The bond focused on facility upgrades and improvements on the school campuses. Student capacity, community growth and over 1,000 students held in modular classrooms for school promoted a new bond measure of $82.735 million known as Measure 30-130 and passed in 2019.

The district currently serves students in one high school, two middle schools, and five elementary schools. A sixth elementary school is currently under construction following successful passage of a bond for $82.7 million in November 2019. Renovations to the high school and a replacement of an additional elementary school are also expected.

== Demographics ==
Between 2014 and 2018, in the Hermiston enrollment breakdown by ethnic group, 36% of its students were of Hispanic origin, of any race; 51% of students were of Non-Hispanic white ancestry; 1% of students were African-American; 3.0% of students were Asian-American; 2.8% of students were of multiple race categories, while Native Americans and Pacific Islanders composed less than 1% of the student population.

In the 2009 school year, the district had 68 students classified as homeless by the Department of Education, or 1.4% of students in the district.

== Schools ==
School	Location	Grades	Notes
Loma Vista Elementary School	Northeast Hermiston	K-5	Built in 2022
Desert View Elementary School	Southwest Hermiston	K-5	Built in 2001
Highland Hills Elementary School	East Hermiston	K-5	Built in 1980
Rocky Heights Elementary School	North Hermiston	K-5	Built in 1962, additions 1968 and 1977
Sunset Elementary School	Central Hermiston	K-5	Built in 1957 with an addition completed in 1968
West Park Elementary School	Central Hermiston	K-5	Built in 1962, renovated in 1957, 1968, and 1977
Armand Larive Middle School	Southwest Hermiston	6-8	Built in 2011
Sandstone Middle School	East Hermiston	6-8	Built in 1995 and named after the original Sandstone school
Hermiston High School	Central Hermiston	9-12	Built in 1934 as Hermiston Union High School
