= Jim Stuart =

American football player (1919–1985)

No. 27
- Position: Tackle

Personal information
- Born: July 2, 1919; Enterprise, Oregon, U.S.
- Died: December 15, 1985 (aged 66); Hermiston, Oregon, U.S.
- Listed height: 6 ft 0 in (1.83 m)
- Listed weight: 212 lb (96 kg)

Career information
- High school: Hermiston
- College: Oregon (1937-1940)
- NFL draft: 1941: 5th round, 40th overall pick

Career history
- Washington Redskins (1941)

Awards and highlights
- First-team All-PCC (1939); Second-team All-PCC (1940)

Career NFL statistics
- Games played: 5
- Games started: 1
- Stats at Pro Football Reference

James Robert Stuart (July 2, 1919 – December 15, 1985) was an American professional football offensive lineman in the National Football League (NFL) for the Washington Redskins. He played college football at the University of Oregon and was drafted in the fifth round of the 1941 NFL draft.
