= Bucky Jacobsen =

American baseball player (born 1975)

- First baseman / Designated hitter
- Born: August 30, 1975 (age 50); Riverton, Wyoming, U.S.
- Batted: Right Threw: Right

MLB debut
- July 16, 2004, for the Seattle Mariners

Last MLB appearance
- September 5, 2004, for the Seattle Mariners

MLB statistics
- Batting average: .275
- Home runs: 9
- Runs batted in: 36
- Stats at Baseball Reference

Teams
- Seattle Mariners (2004)

Larry William Jacobsen (born August 30, 1975) is an American former professional first baseman and designated hitter. He also attended Hermiston High School in Oregon.

== Career ==
Jacobsen was drafted out of Lewis-Clark State College in the 7th round of the 1997 Major League Baseball draft by the Milwaukee Brewers. After six years in the Brewers organization, advancing as high as Triple-A, Jacobsen was released by the Brewers on June 15, 2002. On June 25, 2002, the St. Louis Cardinals signed Jacobsen, assigning him to their Double-A affiliate, the New Haven Ravens. Jacobsen was granted free agency after the 2003 season and signed with the Seattle Mariners on November 10, 2003.

Jacobsen spent the 2004 season with the Mariners Triple-A affiliate, the Tacoma Rainiers, batting .312 with 26 home runs and 86 RBIs. He also won the Pacific Coast League Home Run Derby. His performance earned Jacobsen a call up on July 16, where he maintained his impressive power, hitting 9 home runs in only 160 at bats. A knee injury sidelined Jacobsen for most of September, eventually resulting in a major knee surgery (OATS procedure) on it on May 12, 2005. This caused him to miss the season, and not appear in any major league games in 2005. On February 26, 2006, Jacobsen signed a minor league contract with the Chicago White Sox; however, Jacobsen was released before playing any games for the White Sox. He spent 2006 playing for the Long Island Ducks of the independent Atlantic League of Professional Baseball, batting .291 with 21 home runs and 89 RBI. Jacobsen played 9 games for Olmecas de Tabasco of the Triple-A Mexican League in 2007. After failing to sign with another big-league team, Jacobsen retired from baseball.

From March 2014 to April 2026, Jacobsen and Chuck Powell co-hosted the Chuck and Buck morning show on KJR 93.3 FM. Jacobsen previously did Mariners post-game coverage on Fox affiliate KCPQ Channel 13 in Tacoma. He also coaches the 13U, 14U, and 15U Snoqualmie Valley Bucks select baseball teams in Snoqualmie, Washington, while running a facility called Bucky's Baseball Academy.
