= KQFM =

Adult contemporary radio station in Hermiston, Oregon

Currently silent
- Hermiston, Oregon; United States
- Broadcast area: Umatilla and Morrow County, Oregon
- Frequency: 93.7 MHz
- Branding: 93.7 The Q

Programming
- Format: Adult contemporary
- Affiliations: Westwood One

Ownership
- Owner: West End Radio, LLC
- Sister stations: KOHU

History
- First air date: September 18, 1978 (as KOHU-FM at 99.3)
- Former call signs: KOHU-FM (1978–1984); KQFM-FM (1984–1986)
- Former frequencies: 99.3 MHz (1978–2000); 100.5 MHz (2000–2010); 100.1 MHz (2010–2016)
- Call sign meaning: K Quality FM

Technical information
- Licensing authority: FCC
- Facility ID: 27076
- Class: A
- ERP: 5,300 watts
- HAAT: 94 meters (308 ft)
- Transmitter coordinates: 45°51′57″N 119°18′38″W

Links
- Public license information: Public file; LMS

KQFM (93.7 FM, "The Q") is a radio station licensed to serve Hermiston, Oregon, United States. The station, established in 1978, is owned by West End Radio, LLC, which is in turn owned by the Ronald L. Hughes and Gloria Hughes Living Trust.

== Programming ==
KQFM broadcasts an adult contemporary music format including the satellite-delivered "Adult Contemporary (radio network)" 24-hour live format produced by Westwood One. KQFM had aired the Hits and Favorites radio network provided by ABC Radio Networks and Citadel Media, but the network ceased operations in July 2014, leaving KQFM to affiliate with Westwood One's format. KQFM 100.5 FM recently left its oldies format behind for new programming that features adult contemporary music including hits from the 1970s through the 1990s, plus current popular music. In addition to its usual music programming, KQFM broadcasts select high school sports events featuring teams from Hermiston High School.

== History ==
This station began regular operation on September 18, 1978, broadcasting with 3,000 watts of effective radiated power on a frequency of 99.3 MHz. The station was assigned the call sign KOHU-FM by the Federal Communications Commission. Launched as a sister station of KOHU (1360 AM), KOHU-FM broadcast a beautiful music format under the guidance of general manager and chief engineer Harmon Springer and program director Willie Kelly and the ownership of the Hermiston Broadcasting Company.

The station was assigned new call sign KQFM-FM by the FCC on March 1, 1984. Just over two years later, on November 25, 1986, the station changed call signs again, this time to the simpler KQFM.

In February 1997, the Hermiston Broadcasting Company reached an agreement to sell KQFM and AM sister station KOHU to the Capps Broadcast Group through their West End Radio, LLC, subsidiary. The deal was approved by the FCC on April 16, 1997, and the transaction was consummated on May 1, 1997.

=== Changes of frequency ===
In April 2000, KQFM applied to the FCC to change its assigned broadcast frequency from 99.3 MHz to 100.5 MHz. The change was made as part of a multi-station shuffle to accommodate a power increase by KUJ-FM in Burbank, Washington. The station received a new construction permit to authorize the change on August 8, 2000.

In January 2003, the Capps Family, co-owners of KQFM licensee West End Radio, LLC, announced an agreement to transfer control of the company to Ronald L. Hughes and Gloria Hughes. The deal was approved by the FCC on February 14, 2003, and the transaction was consummated on June 4, 2003. This move coincided with the station's flip from oldies to adult contemporary music. In March 2004, Ronald L. Hughes and Gloria Hughes applied to the FCC to transfer the broadcast license for KQFM to the Ronald L. Hughes and Gloria Hughes Living Trust. The transfer was approved by the FCC on April 7, 2004, and the transaction was consummated on April 12, 2004.

In April 2007, KQFM filed another application with the FCC to change its assigned broadcast frequency again, this time from 100.5 MHz to 100.1 MHz. This move is part of a multi-station shuffle involving KQFM and KWRL to allow religious broadcaster KHSS in Walla Walla, Washington, to obtain a "bigger, more powerful" signal at 100.7 MHz. The transmitter site would also be moved very slightly to the west and the antenna raised to 94 meters (308 ft) in height above average terrain. The station received a new construction permit to authorize the change on September 17, 2007. The station began licensed operation on 100.1 MHz on February 17, 2010.

On February 4, 2016 KQFM moved from 100.1 FM to 93.7 FM, swapping frequencies with KRKG-FM Pasco, Washington, which moved from 93.7 FM to 100.1 FM.

On April 30, 2026, KQFM ceased operations and went silent.

== Previous logo ==
(KQFM's logo under previous 100.5 frequency)
