= Hat Rock State Park =

State park in Oregon, United States

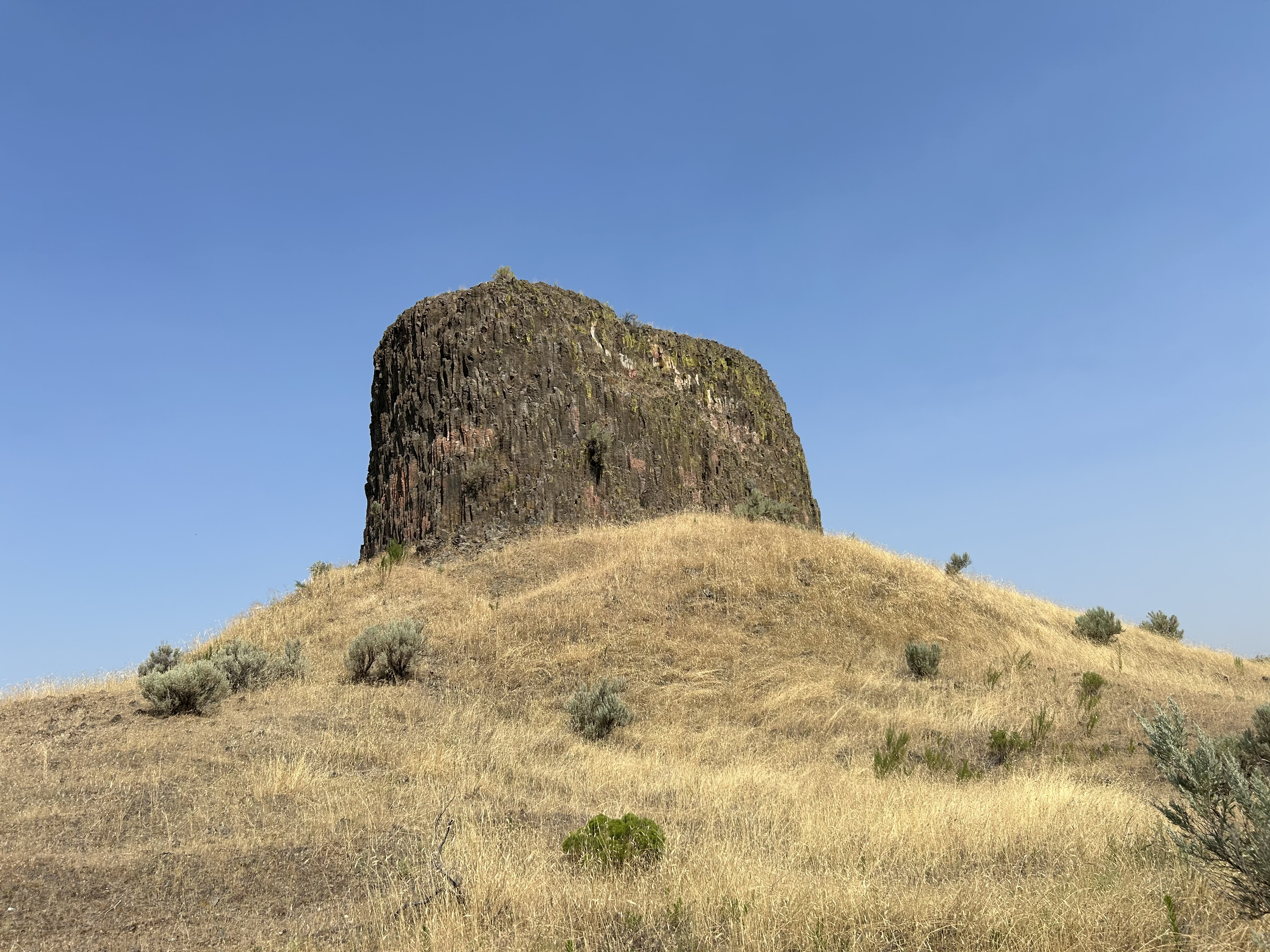
- Hat Rock

- Location within Oregon Location within the United States
- Type: Public, state
- Location: Umatilla County, Oregon
- Nearest city: Hermiston
- Coordinates: 45°54′53″N 119°09′54″W
- Operator: Oregon Parks and Recreation Department

Hat Rock State Park is a state park in the U.S. state of Oregon, administered by the Oregon Parks and Recreation Department. The park is located off the east side of U.S. Highway 730 in Hermiston, on the south shore of Lake Wallula behind McNary Dam on the Columbia River.

== History ==
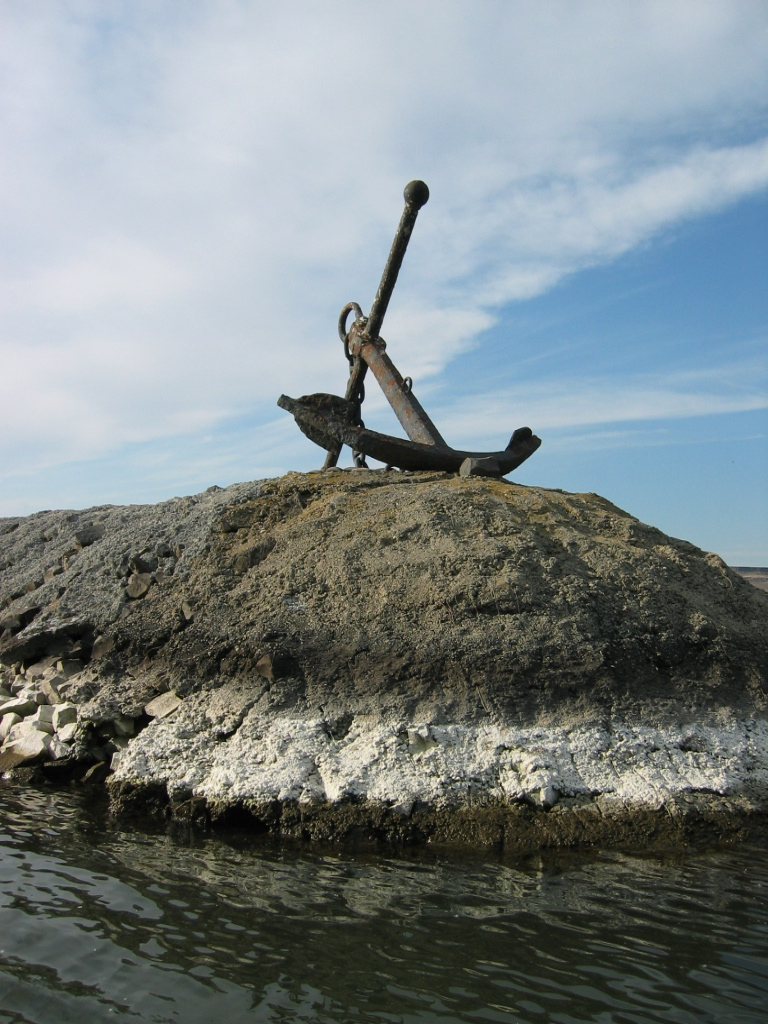
Anchor, a landmark in the Park

Hat Rock is a geological formation that, along with another outcropping rock in the park called Boat Rock, are thought to be exposed remnants of a 12-million-year-old basalt flow. Floods from the Ice Age eventually left these bedrocks, as well as others along the Columbia River Gorge exposed at the surface of the Earth. It is 70 feet (21 meters) high.

Hat Rock was the first landmark passed by the Lewis and Clark Expedition once they reached the Columbia River, and is one of the few remaining sites that has not been submerged by the river. On October 19, 1805, Clark noted in his journal "a rock on the Lard... resembling a hat".

During the construction of the nearby McNary Dam in 1951, 175 acres were purchased by Oregon State Parks from Charles and Eileen Kirk for $5,000. Another 191 acres were leased from the Army Corps of Engineers in 1953, with 2 small additional parcels purchased in the following years.

On June 10, 2023, a wildfire began known as the Hat Rock Fire. It burned over 16,816 acres before being 100% contained by June 13.

== Amenities ==
Hat Rock State Park features hiking trails, horse trails, multiple picnicking areas, flush restrooms, fishing areas, and a boat launch.

== See also ==
- Hermiston Butte
- List of Oregon state parks
