= James Anderson of Hermiston =

Scottish agriculturist, journalist and economist (1739–1808)

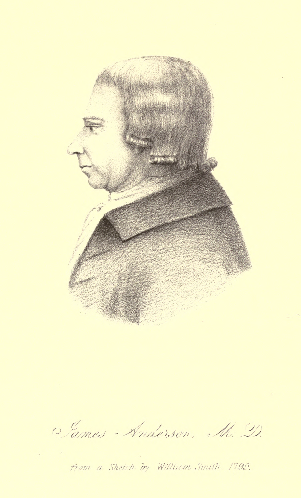
James Anderson circa 1792

James Anderson FRSE FSAScot (1739 – 15 October 1808) was a Scottish agriculturist, journalist and economist. A member of the Edinburgh Philosophical Society, Anderson was a prominent figure in the Scottish Enlightenment. He invented the Scotch plough. As a writer he adopted the nom de plume of Agricola.

== Life ==
Anderson was born at Hermiston, Midlothian the son of a farmer and while still young attended lectures on chemistry by William Cullen, at the University of Edinburgh. At the age of 15, after the death of his father, he took over the working of the ancestral farm.

In 1768 he moved to Aberdeenshire to manage the 1,300 acres (530 ha) farm of Monkshill on land owned by Mr. Udny of Udny under a long lease granted to him for the purpose of demonstrating the benefits of improved agriculture.

== Economic theorist ==
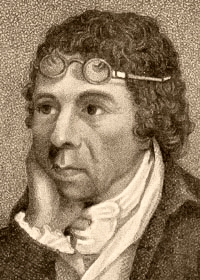
James Anderson, engraving published in the Gentleman's Magazine of May 1809

In 1777 Anderson published An Enquiry into the Nature of the Corn Laws, in which he anticipated David Ricardo's theory of rent. Some historians believe Anderson was the root source for Marx's critique of capitalist agriculture.

Rent, Anderson argued, was a charge for the use of the more fertile soil. The least fertile soils in cultivation generated an income that simply covered the costs of production, while the more fertile soils received a "certain premium for an exclusive privilege to cultivate them; which will be greater or smaller according to the more or less fertility of the soil. It is this premium which constitutes what we now call rent; a medium by means of which the expence ( [sic]) of cultivating soils of very different degrees of fertility may be reduced to a perfect quality." Anderson argued that improvement of the soil was possible; but also that humans could degrade the soil. He argued also that since where farm land in England was held by capitalists, the farmer would tend to avoid improvements the full return for which would not be received during the lease.

Karl Marx's critique of capitalist agriculture drew upon Anderson's analysis and he insisted that soil fertility was a historical issue, and that fertility could both improve or decline. The irrationality of capitalist agriculture, he argued, was bound up with the whole antagonism of town and country out of which bourgeois society had arisen.

== Publisher ==
In 1771 he published "Essays on Planting". In 1773 he contributed the article "Monsoon" to the first Encyclopedia Britannica.

In 1783 he settled in Edinburgh. From 1790 to 1797 he lived at Springfield on Leith Walk north of the city. In 1791 he started a weekly publication called The Bee, which was largely written by himself, and of which 18 volumes were published. In 1797 he began to reside at Isleworth, and from 1799 to 1802 he produced a monthly publication, Recreations in Agriculture, Natural History, Arts and Miscellaneous Literature. He was also the author of many pamphlets on agricultural and economical topics, under numerous aliases, including Agricola, Germanicus, and Timothy Hairbrain. One of his first publications was A Practical Treatise on Chimneys (1776). He was a friend of Jeremy Bentham, and involved in the latter's idea of an ideal prison or Panopticon. Anderson also corresponded with George Washington.

== Inventor ==
The engineer James Green, responsible for the building of some of the first canalboat lifts, credited their invention to Dr James Anderson.

The Scotch plough or Scots plough (not to be confused with the Scottish hand plough) was a wood and iron, animal draft, primary tillage implement (plough) for use on heavy ground invented in the 19th century by James Anderson.

== Honorarium ==
In 1780 Anderson received an LLD (honorary doctorate in law) from the University of Aberdeen. He was elected a member of the American Philosophical Society in 1791. He died in West Ham, Essex on 15 October 1808.

== Family ==
In 1768 Anderson married Margaret Seton (d. 1788). Together they had 13 children, one daughter and five sons survived their father; their son, John, was apprenticed to Thomas Bewick. Their daughter, Margaret (1778–1863), married Benjamin Outram.
