= KQFO =

- Pasco, Washington; United States
- Broadcast area: Tri-Cities, Washington
- Frequency: 100.1 MHz
- Branding: La Fiera 100.1

Programming
- Format: Regional Mexican

Ownership
- Owner: Noemy Rodriguez
- Sister stations: KYJJ, KZJJ

History
- First air date: 1997 (as KGSG at 93.7)
- Former call signs: KGSG (1997–2010); KRKG-FM (2010–2016)
- Former frequencies: 93.7 MHz (1997–2016)

Technical information
- Licensing authority: FCC
- Facility ID: 78988
- Class: C2
- ERP: 8,400 watts
- HAAT: 362 meters (1,188 ft)
- Transmitter coordinates: 46°6′15″N 119°7′48″W

Links
- Public license information: Public file; LMS
- Website: leadersmediagroup.com

Previous logo

KQFO (100.1 FM) is a radio station licensed to Pasco, Washington, United States, and serves the Tri-Cities area. The station is currently owned by Noemy Rodriguez. On October 1, 2010, the call sign was changed from KGSG to KRKG-FM.

== Timeline ==
On February 4, 2016, KRKG-FM moved from 93.7 FM to 100.1 FM, swapping frequencies with KQFM Hermiston, Oregon, which moved from 100.1 FM to 93.7 FM. The station is broadcasting at 100.1 MHz under a construction permit; its broadcast license is still held at 93.7 MHz.

On February 8, 2016, KRKG-FM changed their format to adult album alternative, branded as "100.1 The Oasis". The station changed its call sign to KQFO on February 9. On December 14, 2016, KQFO changed their format from adult album alternative to classic rock, calling it "Oz 100, Legends of Rock". Just 3 months later, on March 23, 2017, 100.1 flipped to adult hits as "100.1 Bob FM".

On August 21, 2018, KQFO changed their format from adult hits to regional Mexican, branded as "La Ley".

On December 10, 2020, Alexandra Communications sold KQFO and translator 106.9 K295AV to Noemy Rodriguez's Alcon Media for $736,000. Alcon Media began operating the stations under a LMA, and rebranded KQFO as "Radio La Raza". The sale was consummated on April 1, 2021.
