= Hinkle Locomotive Service and Repair Facility =

Union Pacific Railroad workshop in Oregon

Coordinates: 45.796614°N 119.26579°W

The original Hinkle Locomotive Shop in July 1998.

The Union Pacific Railroad's (UP) Hinkle Locomotive Service and Repair Facility is located within the railroad's yard at Hinkle, Umatilla County, Oregon, United States. The first locomotive shop and servicing facilities at Hinkle were constructed in 1951 as part of the general relocation of railroads and highways in north-central Oregon because of the construction of the McNary Dam on the Columbia River. Before 1951, the primary yard and locomotive facilities in the area were located at Rieth, Oregon, four miles west of Pendleton.

As a result of the construction of the McNary Dam, and later the John Day Dam, the UP mainline from Boardman, Oregon to Juniper, Oregon, would be flooded in numerous places due to the backpools behind the dams. UP took advantage of this situation to consolidate trackage and replace antiquated locomotive maintenance and repair facilities at Rieth and Umatilla. In 1951, the original locomotive shop and servicing facility was constructed as part of the creation of a new yard at Hinkle to replace the yards at Umatilla and Rieth.

Before 1951, Hinkle had merely been the junction of the original Oregon Railway and Navigation Company (OR&N) mainline which ran north to Umatilla and then west to Portland, and the Coyote Cutoff which was constructed in 1914-1915 between Hinkle and Boardman where it rejoined the original OR&N mainline.

From 1977 to 1997, Hinkle served as an Amtrak stop along the Pioneer route. This station stop provided rail passenger service to local communities including Hermiston, Boardman, and Stanfield. The Hinkle Amtrak station, a typical Amtrak passenger shed and parking lot, is now property of the Union Pacific Railroad and off limits to the public.
