= Umatilla County Fair =

Annual event in Oregon, United States

Coordinates: 45.837837°N 119.29526°W

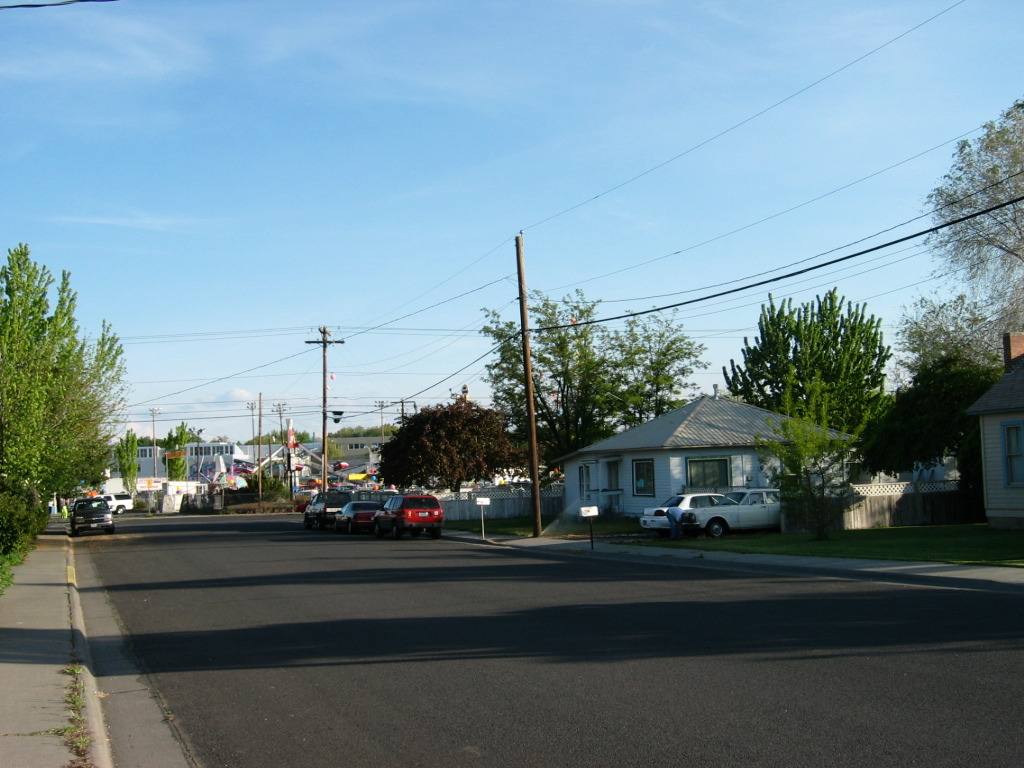
- Fairgrounds at the end of Orchard St.
- Genre: County fair
- Dates: 10–14 August 2021
- Location: Hermiston, Oregon
- Years active: 1912–16; 1919–41; 1946–2019; 2021–
- Website: Umatilla Fair

The Umatilla County Fair is a fair held in Hermiston in Umatilla County, Oregon. The fair runs from the middle of June through to the middle of August each year. It was started in August 1912 as the Hermiston Dairy and Hog Show as a joint fair with Morrow County, a one-time-only affair since legislation in 1913 made it no longer possible to have a bi-county fair.

This old-fashioned fair is held annually in Eastern Oregon and generally provides traveling carnival rides, livestock and open class exhibits, and live entertainers with bleacher capacity of about 500 people in conjunction with Farm City Pro Rodeo.

The fair had just a youth livestock auction in 2020, as others were cancelled on grounds of COVID-19 pandemic.
