= Hermiston Municipal Airport =

Airport in Oregon, United States

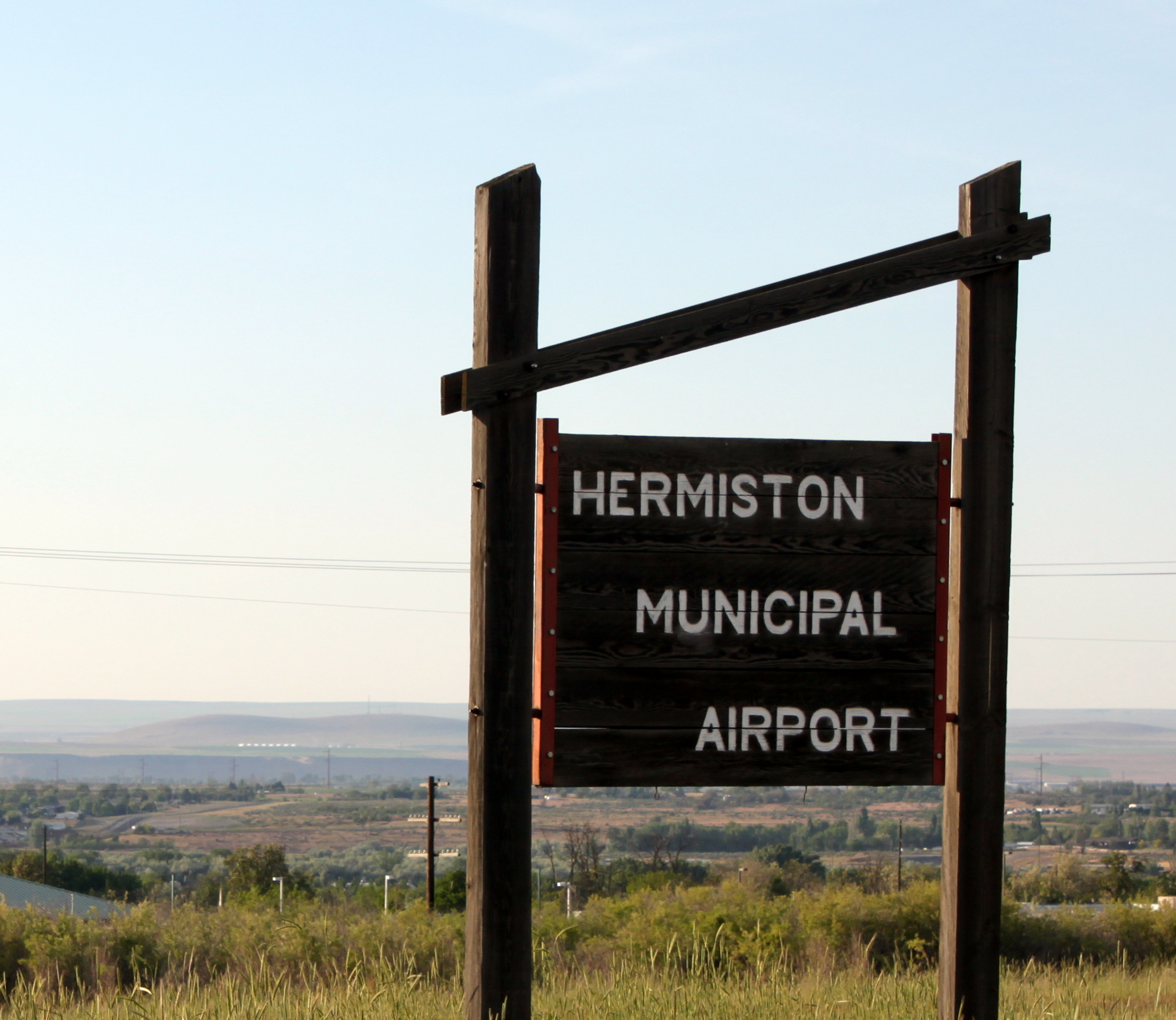
- IATA: HES; ICAO: KHRI; FAA LID: HRI

Summary
- Airport type: Public
- Owner: City of Hermiston
- Serves: Hermiston, Oregon
- Elevation AMSL: 644 ft (196 m)
- Coordinates: 45°49′42″N 119°15′33″W
- Interactive map of Hermiston Municipal Airport

Runways
Direction	Length		Surface
Direction	ft	m	Surface
5/23	4,500	1,372	Asphalt

Statistics (2004)
- Aircraft operations: 24,850
- Based aircraft: 42
- Source: Federal Aviation Administration

Hermiston Municipal Airport (IATA: HES, ICAO: KHRI, FAA LID: HRI, formerly S22) is a city-owned, public-use airport located two nautical miles (3.7 km) southeast of the central business district of Hermiston, in Umatilla County, Oregon, United States.

Although most U.S. airports use the same three-letter location identifier for the FAA and IATA, this airport is assigned HRI by the FAA and HES by the IATA.

== Facilities and aircraft ==
Hermiston Municipal Airport covers an area of 267 acres (108 ha) at an elevation of 644 feet (196 m) above mean sea level. It has one runway designated 5/23 with an asphalt surface measuring 4,500 by 75 feet (1,372 x 23 m).

For the 12-month period ending September 1, 2017, the airport had 13,240 aircraft operations, an average of 36 per day. At that time there were 38 aircraft based at this airport: 31 single-engine piston, 1 multi-engine piston, 5 Turboprop, and 1 Turbojet.

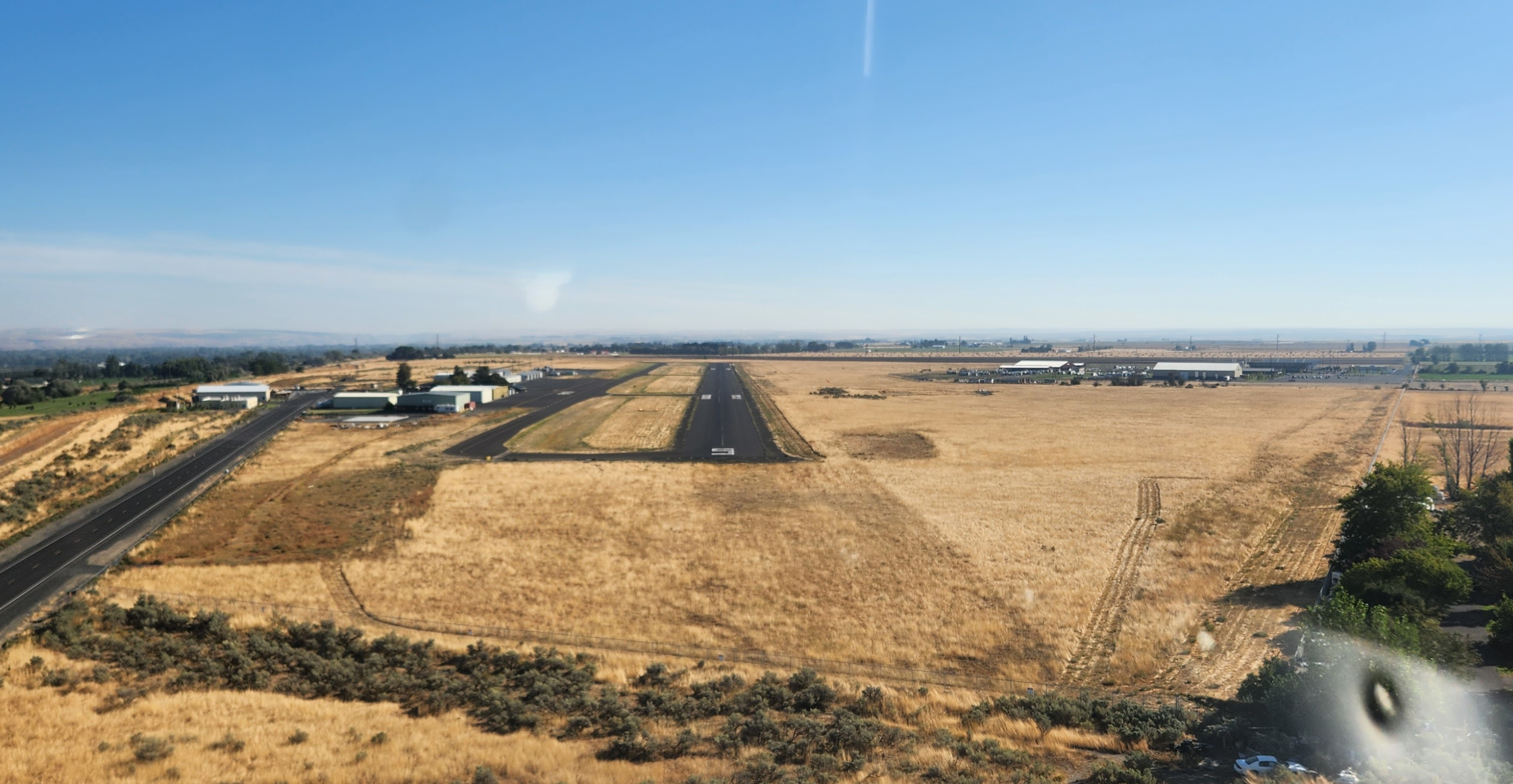
Runway 5

== Cargo carriers ==
Airlines	Destinations
Ameriflight	La Grande, Portland, OR
