= KOHU =

Currently silent
- Hermiston, Oregon; United States
- Broadcast area: Umatilla County, Oregon; Morrow County, Oregon
- Frequency: 1360 kHz
- Branding: Real Country

Programming
- Format: Classic Country
- Affiliations: Citadel Media

Ownership
- Owner: West End Radio, LLC
- Sister stations: KQFM

History
- First air date: February 6, 1956

Technical information
- Licensing authority: FCC
- Facility ID: 27077
- Class: B
- Power: 4,300 watts (day); 500 watts (night)
- Transmitter coordinates: 45°51′56.5″N 119°18′49.1″W

Links
- Public license information: Public file; LMS

KOHU (1360 AM, "Real Country") is a radio station licensed to serve Hermiston, Oregon, United States. The station, which began broadcasting in 1956, is owned by West End Radio, LLC, and serves Umatilla County and Morrow County, Oregon.

== Programming ==
Until April 30, 2026, KOHU broadcast a classic country music format relying in large part on the "Real Country" satellite-fed programming service from Citadel Media. In addition to its music programming, KOHU broadcasts local news, agricultural news, high school sports, and a community affairs program called "The Odds n Ends Show". Syndicated programming includes shows hosted by Mike Huckabee and Dr. James Dobson. These programs run every weekday on the "Morning Update."

The Morning Update is a morning show that's hosted by "Jeff Walker" and "Erick Olson". Also included in "The Morning Update" is "The Odds n Ends Show" and the "Flea Market", a show where listeners can call in and buy, sell, or trade items. "The Morning Update" runs an hour longer during the summer for "The Lawn and Garden Show". "The Lawn and Garden Show" is a show when two extension agents, from the OSU Hermiston Agricultural Research and Extension Center give expert advice to listeners about their lawn or garden. The show was discontinued at the end of the 2010 growing season.

== History ==
=== Launch on 1570 ===
Original owners Carl F. & Sarah Knierim were issued a construction permit in 1955 by the Federal Communications Commission for a new AM radio station broadcasting with 250 watts of power, daytime-only, on a frequency of 1570 kHz. The station, assigned the KOHU call sign by the FCC, began regular broadcast operations on February 6, 1956. In 1959, the station was authorized to increase its daytime signal power to 1,000 watts.

The Hermiston Broadcasting Company purchased KOHU from Carl F. & Sarah Knierim in a transaction that was consummated on June 9, 1966. Robert Chopping was president of the company and Harmon Springer was named the station's general manager.

In 1968, the station was airing 12 hours of country & western music each week in addition to its previous middle of the road music format. By 1970, the format was an even split between country and MOR music.

The FCC granted KOHU authorization to add nighttime service at the same 1,000 watt power level as its daytime broadcasts, albeit with a directional antenna array to minimize interference with other stations on the same frequency.

=== Move to 1360 ===
KOHU changed frequencies to 1360 kHz in 1974 which allowed the station to cover a larger area with the same power output and also allowed the station to use a non-directional antenna during the daytime. The station began to experiment by adding some rock music to the format. However, by 1978 the station was airing the pure country music format that it would air in one form or another for the next three decades.

In February 1997, the Hermiston Broadcasting Company reached an agreement to sell KOHU to the Capps Broadcast Group through their West End Radio, LLC, subsidiary. The deal was approved by the FCC on April 16, 1997, and the transaction was consummated on May 1, 1997.

=== KOHU today ===
In January 2003, the Capps Family, co-owners of KOHU licensee West End Radio, LLC, announced an agreement to transfer control of the company to Ronald L. Hughes and Gloria Hughes. The deal was approved by the FCC on February 14, 2003, and the transaction was consummated on June 4, 2003. In March 2004, Ronald L. Hughes and Gloria Hughes applied to the FCC to transfer the broadcast license for KOHU to the Ronald L. Hughes and Gloria Hughes Living Trust. The transfer was approved by the FCC on April 7, 2004, and the transaction was consummated on April 12, 2004.

On April 30, 2026, KOHU ceased operations and went silent.
