= Hermiston Butte =

Landform in Oregon, United States

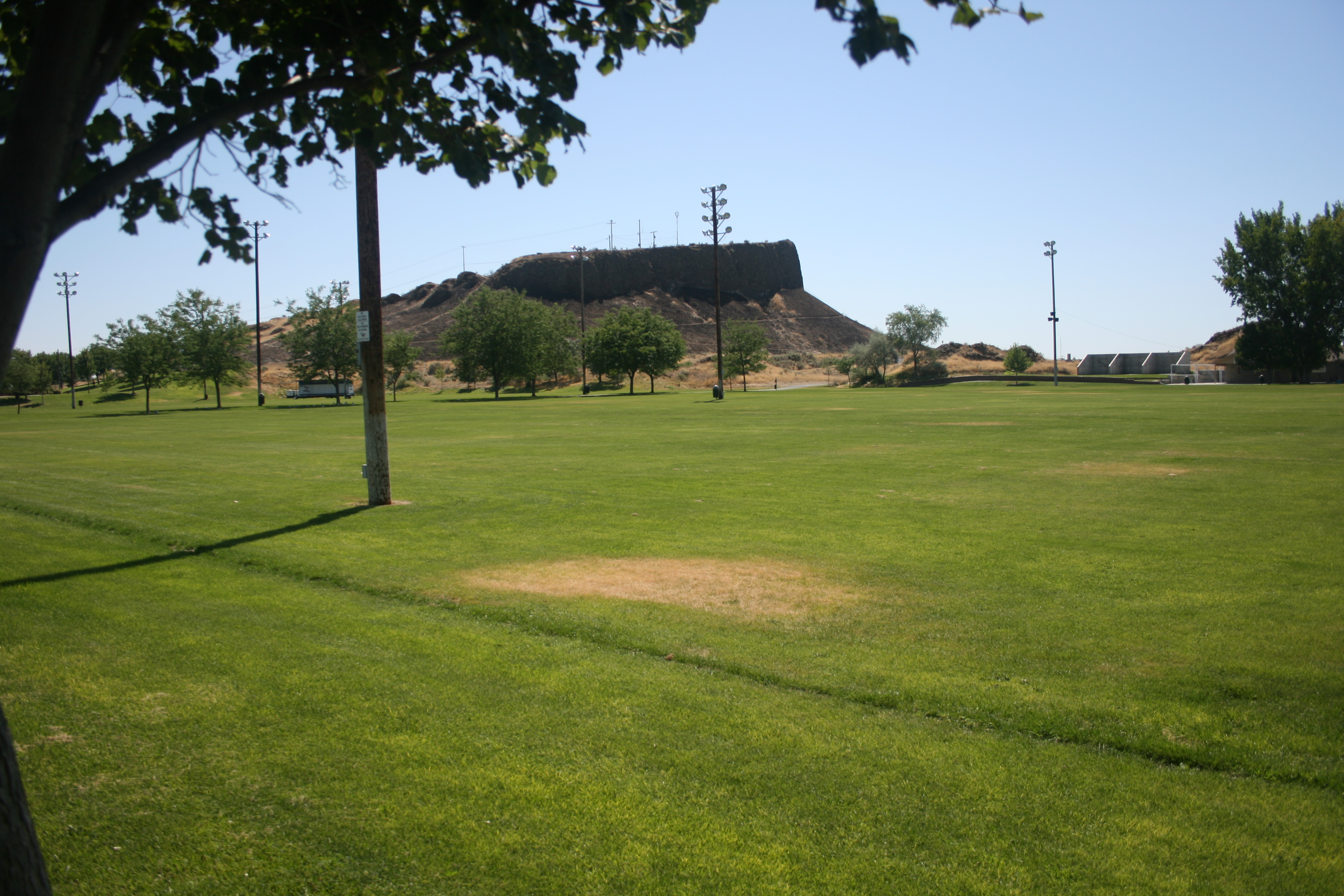
- Hermiston Butte as seen from Butte Park.

Highest point
- Elevation: 610 ft (190 m) NAVD 88
- Prominence: 150 ft (46 m)
- Isolation: 7 mi (11 km)
- Coordinates: 45°50′50″N 119°18′15″W

Geography
- Location within Oregon
- Location: Hermiston, Umatilla County, Oregon, U.S.
- Parent range: Columbia River Plateau
- Topo map: USGS Hermiston

Climbing
- Easiest route: Hike

Hermiston Butte is a small butte rising above the west side of Hermiston, Oregon. There are a few hiking trails leading to the top, as well as an access road which is closed to public automobile use. From the top one can see much of Hermiston and the surrounding area.

Hermiston Butte is protected by Butte Park, which is 40 acres, and includes four soccer fields, a large playground and an aquatic center. Hermiston High School's cross country team hosts the Butte Challenge, a foot race of varying distances, at Butte Park annually.

== See also ==
- Hat Rock State Park
