= KZJJ =

- West Richland, Washington; United States
- Broadcast area: Tri-Cities, Washington
- Frequency: 104.5 MHz
- Branding: La Ranchera 104.5

Programming
- Format: Regional Mexican

Ownership
- Owner: Noemy Rodriguez
- Sister stations: KQFO, KYJJ

History
- First air date: 2022

Technical information
- Licensing authority: FCC
- Facility ID: 203618
- Class: A
- ERP: 920 watts
- HAAT: 257 meters (843 ft)
- Transmitter coordinates: 46°14′3.6″N 119°19′17.4″W

Links
- Public license information: Public file; LMS
- Website: laranchera1045kzjj.com

KZJJ (104.5 FM) is a radio station licensed to West Richland, Washington, United States, and serves the Tri-Cities area. The station is currently owned by Noemy Rodriguez.

== Background ==
In 2021, Xana Oregon won both KYJJ and KZJJ as a part of FCC's Auction 109. KYJJ went on the air on October 29, 2021, simulcasting KYOZ, while KZJJ had yet to sign on.

On March 18, 2022, Xana Oregon announced it would sell the station (which had yet to sign on) and sister station KYJJ 94.1 Boardman to Noemy Rodriguez's Alcon Media for $600,000.

On August 12, 2022, KZJJ signed on and began simulcasting KYJJ, branded as "La Ranchera 104.5/94.1". On May 15, 2023, KYJJ broke off from KZJJ, flipping to a Bilingual CHR, branded as "La Bomba Latin Mix 104.9/94.1", while KZJJ continues to broadcast a Regional Mexican format branded as "La Ranchera 104.5".

On July 8, 2025, KZJJ changed its city of license to West Richland and moved its transmitter to the top of Badger Mountain.
