= KLKY =

- Stanfield, Oregon; United States
- Frequency: 96.1 MHz
- Branding: U-Rock Radio

Programming
- Format: Classic rock

Ownership
- Owner: Jacobs Radio Programming, LLC

History
- First air date: 2005

Technical information
- Licensing authority: FCC
- Facility ID: 164091
- Class: C2
- ERP: 8,500 watts
- HAAT: 359 meters (1,178 ft)
- Transmitter coordinates: 45°29′12″N 119°25′52″W
- Translators: 95.3 K237DP (Kennewick, WA)

Links
- Public license information: Public file; LMS
- Website: urockfm.com

KLKY (96.1 FM, "U-Rock Radio") is a radio station broadcasting a classic rock music format. Licensed to Stanfield, Oregon, United States, the station is currently owned by Jacobs Radio Programming, LLC.

== Translators ==
KLKY rebroadcasts its signal on the following translator:

Broadcast translator for KLKY
Call sign	Frequency	City of license	FID	ERP (W)	Class	FCC info
K237DP	95.3 FM	Kennewick, Washington	150553	34	D	LMS
