= KJR =

KJR may refer to:

- KJR (AM), a radio station (950 AM) licensed to serve Seattle, Washington, United States
- KJR-FM, a radio station (93.3 FM) licensed to serve Seattle, Washington
- KJEB, a radio station (95.7 FM) licensed to serve Seattle, Washington, which held the call sign KJR-FM from 1994 to 2000 and from 2002 to 2022
- Kiski Junction Railroad in Pennsylvania, U.S.
