= Stanfield, Oregon =

- City
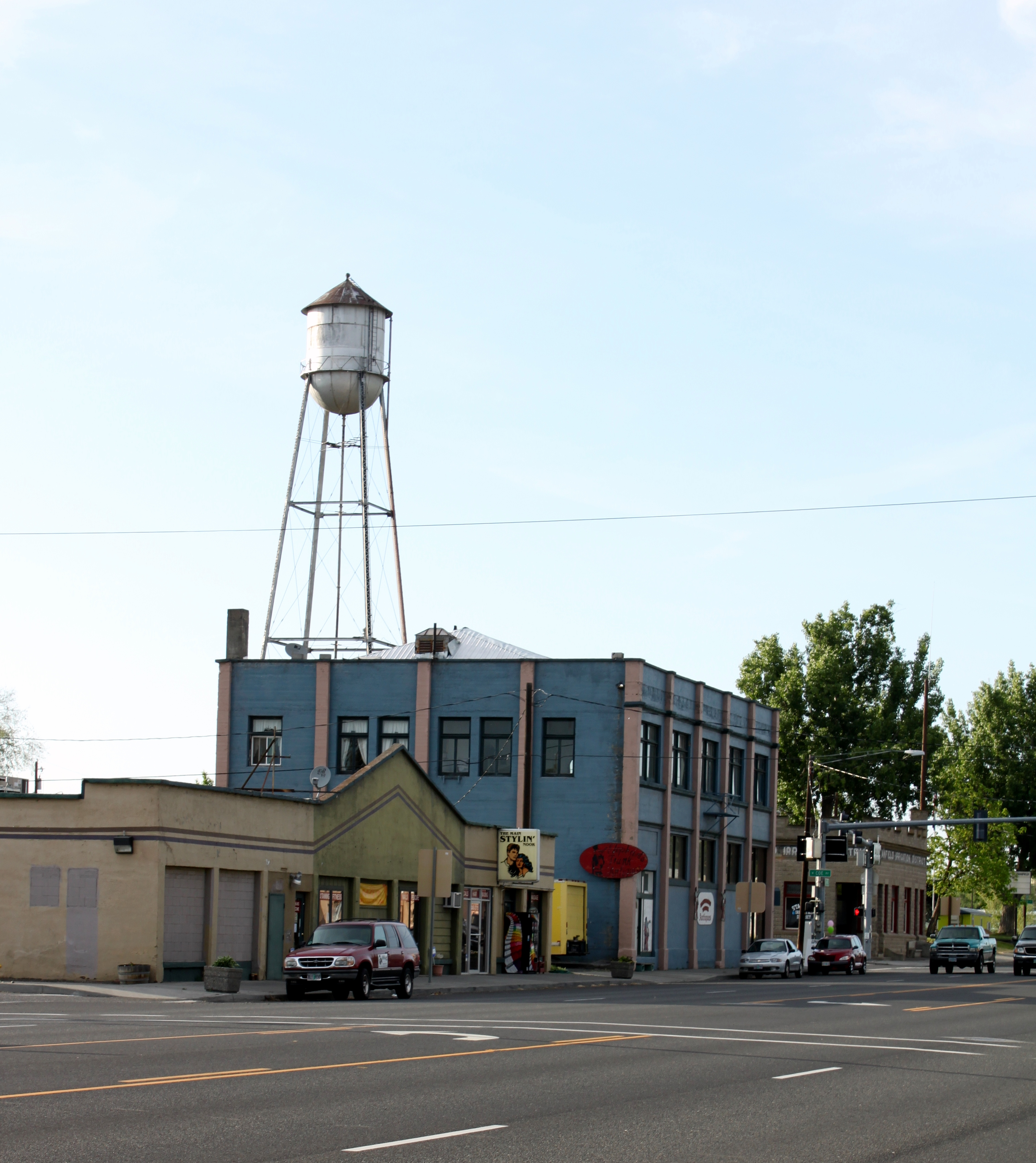
- Buildings and water tower in Stanfield

- Location in Oregon
- Coordinates: 45°46′56″N 119°12′58″W
- Country: United States
- State: Oregon
- County: Umatilla
- Incorporated: 1910

Area
  - Total: 1.73 sq mi (4.47 km^{2})
  - Land: 1.73 sq mi (4.47 km^{2})
  - Water: 0 sq mi (0.00 km^{2})
- Elevation: 591 ft (180 m)

Population (2020)
  - Total: 2,144
  - Density: 1,241.6/sq mi (479.37/km^{2})
- Time zone: UTC-8 (Pacific)
  - Summer (DST): UTC-7 (Pacific)
- ZIP code: 97875
- Area code: 541
- FIPS code: 41-69900
- GNIS feature ID: 2411967
- Website: cityofstanfield.com

Stanfield (English: /ˈstænfiːld/) is a city in Umatilla County, Oregon, United States. As of the 2020 census, Stanfield had a population of 2,144. It is part of the Pendleton–Hermiston Micropolitan Statistical Area.

== Geography ==
According to the United States Census Bureau, the city has a total area of 1.53 square miles (3.96 km^{2}), all of it land.

== History ==
The location was originally named "Foster" for John R. Foster, of Portland, who was an associate of Allen & Lewis. The firm had interests in the Umatilla area and purchased 4,000 acres northeast of Echo. They established a large ranch there and a store and small community followed; they were all named for Foster. In 1882, the Oregon Railway & Navigation Company siding and stop was named "Fosters". A post office with the name of Foster was established in 1883; the name was changed to Stanfield in 1909 for Robert N. Stanfield Jr., who later became a U.S. senator from Oregon.

== Demographics ==
Historical population
Census	Pop.	Note	%±
1910	318		—
1920	278		−12.6%
1930	204		−26.6%
1940	241		18.1%
1950	845		250.6%
1960	745		−11.8%
1970	891		19.6%
1980	1,568		76.0%
1990	1,568		0.0%
2000	1,979		26.2%
2010	2,043		3.2%
2020	2,144		4.9%
U.S. Decennial Census

=== 2020 census ===
As of the 2020 census, Stanfield had a population of 2,144. The median age was 35.9 years. 26.6% of residents were under the age of 18 and 14.2% of residents were 65 years of age or older. For every 100 females there were 100.7 males, and for every 100 females age 18 and over there were 100.3 males age 18 and over.

0% of residents lived in urban areas, while 100.0% lived in rural areas.

There were 772 households in Stanfield, of which 38.0% had children under the age of 18 living in them. Of all households, 49.6% were married-couple households, 19.9% were households with a male householder and no spouse or partner present, and 22.0% were households with a female householder and no spouse or partner present. About 21.9% of all households were made up of individuals and 9.8% had someone living alone who was 65 years of age or older.

There were 800 housing units, of which 3.5% were vacant. Among occupied housing units, 67.4% were owner-occupied and 32.6% were renter-occupied. The homeowner vacancy rate was 0.8% and the rental vacancy rate was 4.2%.

Racial composition as of the 2020 census
Race	Number	Percent
White	1,325	61.8%
Black or African American	6	0.3%
American Indian and Alaska Native	23	1.1%
Asian	9	0.4%
Native Hawaiian and Other Pacific Islander	5	0.2%
Some other race	371	17.3%
Two or more races	405	18.9%
Hispanic or Latino (of any race)	791	36.9%

=== 2010 census ===
As of the census of 2010, there were 2,043 people, 682 households, and 513 families living in the city. The population density was 1,335.3 inhabitants per square mile (515.6/km^{2}). There were 735 housing units at an average density of 480.4 per square mile (185.5/km^{2}). The racial makeup of the city was 66.9% White, 0.1% African American, 1.6% Native American, 0.1% Asian, 27.2% from other races, and 4.1% from two or more races. Hispanic or Latino of any race were 35.9% of the population.

There were 682 households, of which 41.5% had children under the age of 18 living with them, 55.7% were married couples living together, 10.9% had a female householder with no husband present, 8.7% had a male householder with no wife present, and 24.8% were non-families. 18.6% of all households were made up of individuals, and 6.4% had someone living alone who was 65 years of age or older. The average household size was 3.00 and the average family size was 3.42.

The median age in the city was 31.8 years. 31.6% of residents were under the age of 18; 8.8% were between the ages of 18 and 24; 26.6% were from 25 to 44; 24.8% were from 45 to 64; and 8.3% were 65 years of age or older. The gender makeup of the city was 50.5% male and 49.5% female.

=== 2000 census ===
As of the census of 2000, there were 1,979 people, 661 households, and 497 families living in the city. The population density was 1,372.0 inhabitants per square mile (529.7/km^{2}). There were 714 housing units at an average density of 495.0 per square mile (191.1/km^{2}). The racial makeup of the city was 68.12% White, 0.56% African American, 1.31% Native American, 0.30% Asian, 0.25% Pacific Islander, 25.82% from other races, and 3.64% from two or more races. Hispanic or Latino of any race were 31.03% of the population.

There were 661 households, out of which 38.9% had children under the age of 18 living with them, 59.5% were married couples living together, 8.5% had a female householder with no husband present, and 24.8% were non-families. 18.2% of all households were made up of individuals, and 7.7% had someone living alone who was 65 years of age or older. The average household size was 2.99 and the average family size was 3.40.

In the city, the population was spread out, with 32.1% under the age of 18, 10.7% from 18 to 24, 28.2% from 25 to 44, 20.0% from 45 to 64, and 9.0% who were 65 years of age or older. The median age was 29 years. For every 100 females, there were 106.8 males. For every 100 females age 18 and over, there were 109.0 males.

The median income for a household in the city was $35,286, and the median income for a family was $38,145. Males had a median income of $28,578 versus $18,841 for females. The per capita income for the city was $12,842. About 10.6% of families and 14.2% of the population were below the poverty line, including 20.4% of those under age 18 and 7.6% of those age 65 or over.
