= La Grande/Union County Airport =

Coordinates: 45°17′25″N 118°00′26″W

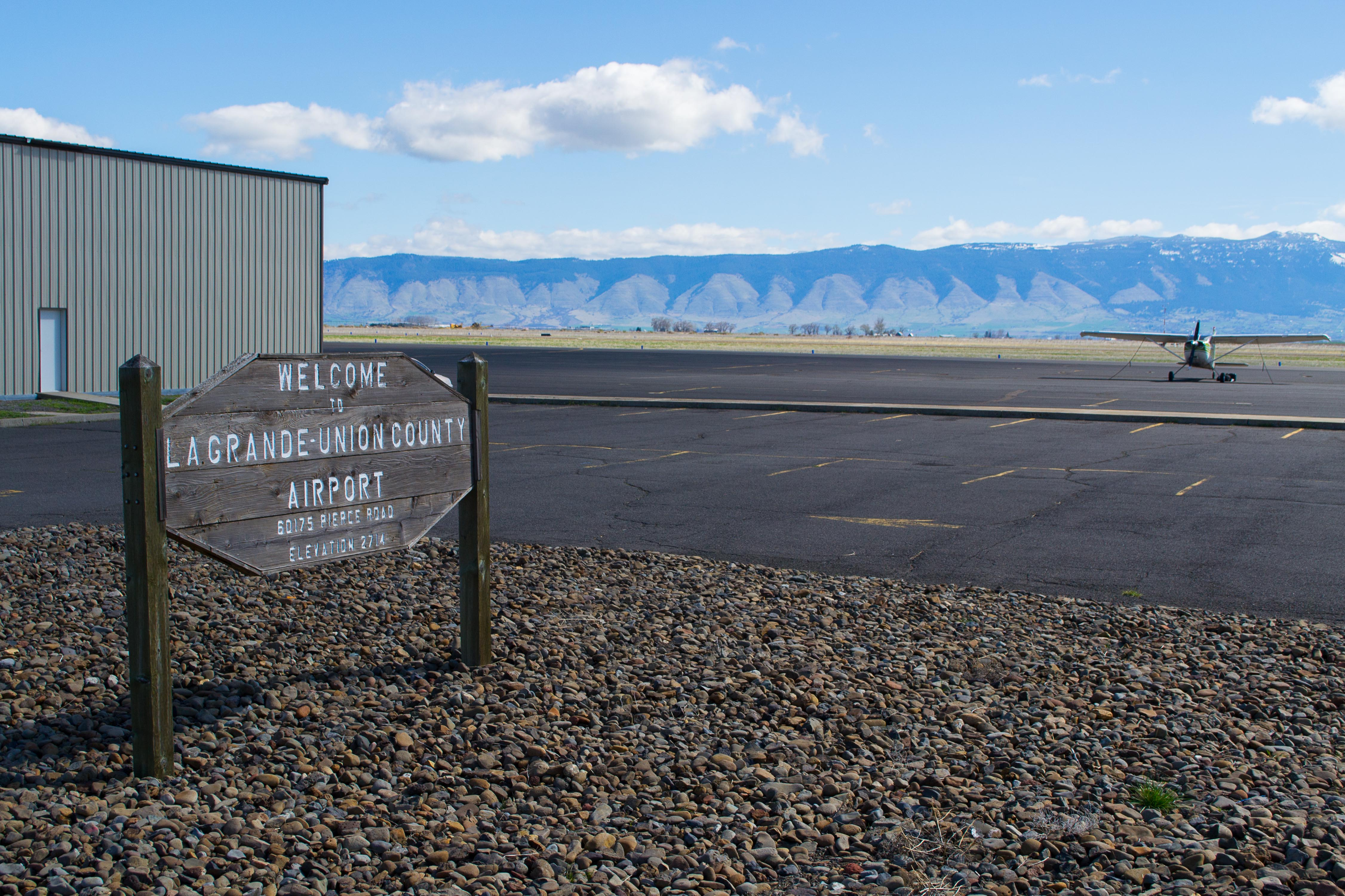
- IATA: LGD; ICAO: KLGD; FAA LID: LGD

Summary
- Airport type: Public
- Owner: Union County
- Serves: La Grande, Oregon
- Elevation AMSL: 2,717 ft / 828 m
- Interactive map of La Grande/Union County Airport

Runways
Direction	Length		Surface
Direction	ft	m	Surface
12/30	6,261	1,908	Asphalt
17/35	3,400	1,036	Asphalt

Statistics (2018)
- Aircraft operations (year ending 8/28/2018): 16,000
- Source: Federal Aviation Administration

La Grande/Union County Airport (IATA: LGD, ICAO: KLGD, FAA LID: LGD) is four miles southeast of La Grande, in Union County, Oregon, United States. It is owned by Union County.

West Coast Airlines DC-3s stopped at the airport from 1959 to 1960.

== Facilities ==
The airport covers 640 acres (260 ha) and has two asphalt runways: 12/30 is 6,261 x 100 ft (1,908 x 30 m) and 17/35 is 3,400 x 75 ft (1,036 x 23 m).

In the year ending August 28, 2018, the airport had 16,000 aircraft operations, average 44 per day: 81% general aviation, 16% air taxi and 3% military.

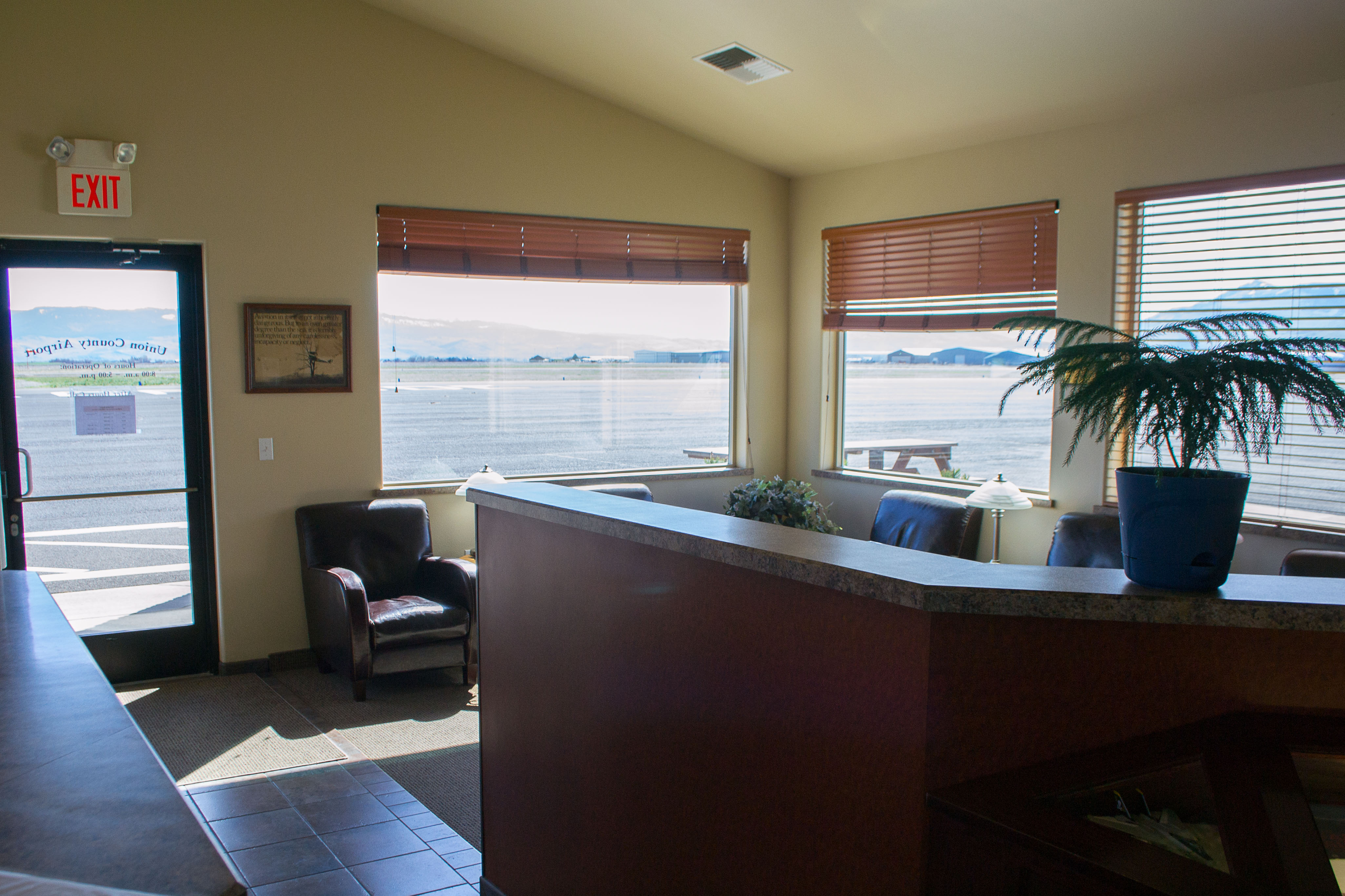
Waiting room at LGD

== Cargo carriers ==
Airlines	Destinations
Ameriflight	Hermiston, Klamath Falls, Portland, OR
FedEx Feeder	Pendleton, Spokane
