= Local government district =

Local government district may refer to:

- Local authority district, in England
- Local government district (Northern Ireland)
- Local government district (Manitoba)

== Historical ==
- Districts of Wales
- Local government districts of Scotland
- Local board of health

== See also ==
- Local government in the United Kingdom
