= Lake Wallula =

- Location within Oregon Location within Washington (state) Location within the United States
- Location: Washington / Oregon, United States
- Coordinates: 45°56′11″N 119°17′52″W
- Type: reservoir
- Primary inflows: Columbia River; Snake River; Yakima River; Walla Walla River
- Primary outflows: Columbia River
- Basin countries: United States
- Surface elevation: 340 ft (100 m)

Lake Wallula is a reservoir on the Columbia River in the United States, between the U.S. states of Washington and Oregon. It was created in 1954 with the construction of McNary Dam. It reaches from McNary Dam near the city of Umatilla, Oregon, to the Tri-Cities of Washington. The Wallula Gap is a prominent geological feature of Lake Wallula, and has been recognized by National Park Service as a National Natural Landmark, as a site that provides an important illustration of the geological history of the United States.

Lake Wallula is part of the vast Columbia Basin, a region renowned for its agricultural productivity, hydroelectric power generation, and a destination for recreational activities. Recreational angling for species such as salmon, bass, sturgeon, and walleye are popular activities on the lake.

== See also ==
- Wallula Gap
- List of lakes of Oregon
- List of hydroelectric dams on the Columbia River
