= Hermiston, Edinburgh =

Hamlet in Edinburgh, Scotland

Coordinates: 55°55′4″N 3°18′48″W

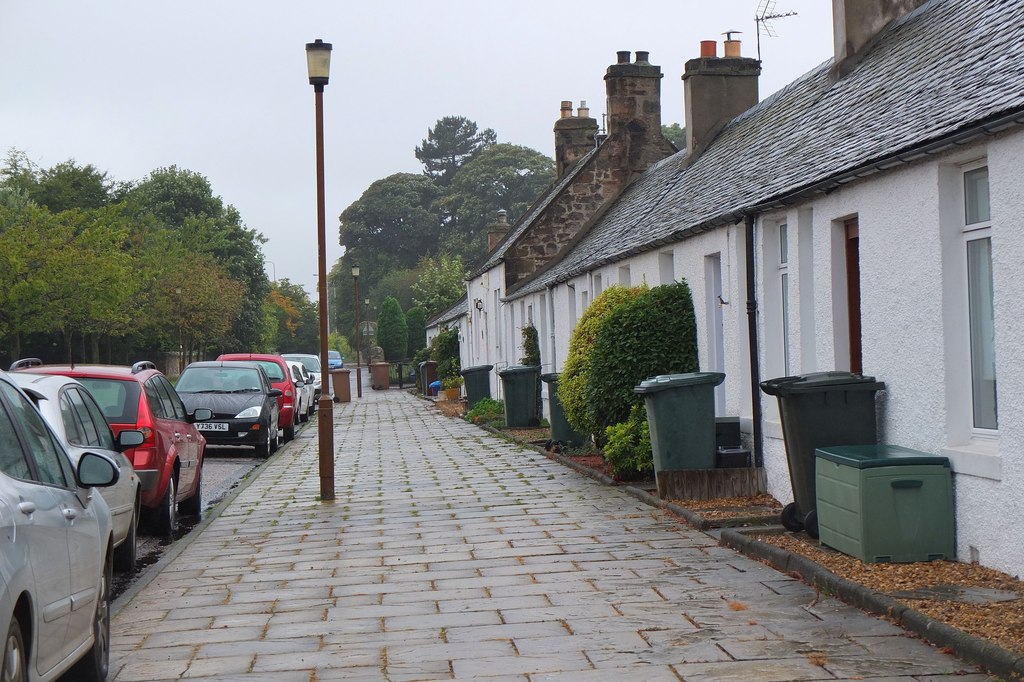

Hermiston is a hamlet formerly in the county of Midlothian and now part of Edinburgh, the capital of Scotland. It is north of Heriot-Watt University's Riccarton Campus and west of the Hermiston Gait commercial development. Hermiston is bounded by the A71 Calder Road to the south and the Union Canal to the north with the M8 motorway just beyond. A park and ride site serving western Edinburgh is located south-west of the A71 Calder Road roundabout.

The hamlet forms the Hermiston Conservation Area.

Hermiston is also notable as the setting of the Robert Louis Stevenson novel Weir of Hermiston. The city of Hermiston, Oregon in turn takes its name from the book.

== Sources ==
- (Google Maps)
- Bell, Raymond MacKean Literary Corstorphine: A reader's guide to West Edinburgh, Leamington Books, Edinburgh 2017
