= McNary Dam =

Dam on the Columbia River in the United States

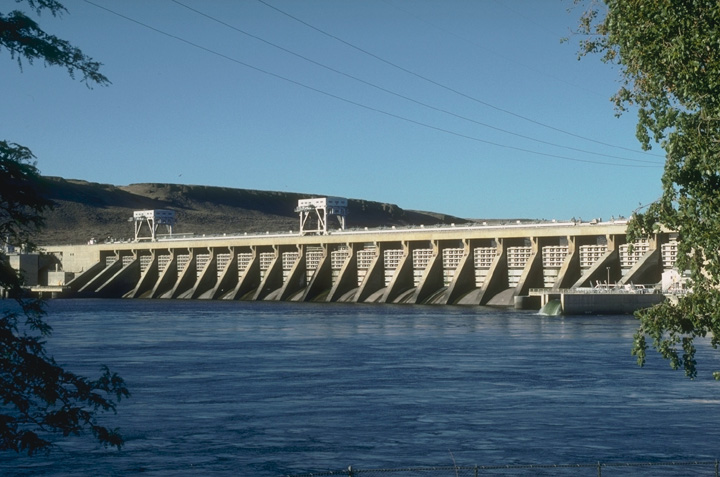
- Spillway view from the southwest, Oregon side of the Columbia River
- Interactive map of McNary Dam
- Location: Benton County, Washington / Umatilla County, Oregon, U.S.
- Coordinates: 45°55′47″N 119°17′46″W
- Construction began: 1947
- Opening date: 1954
- Operator: U.S. Army Corps of Engineers

Dam and spillways
- Type of dam: Concrete gravity, run-of-the-river
- Impounds: Columbia River
- Height: 183 feet (56 m)
- Length: 7,365 feet (2,245 m)
- Spillway type: Service, gate-controlled

Reservoir
- Creates: Lake Wallula
- Total capacity: 1,350,000 acre⋅ft (1.67 km^{3})

Power Station
- Commission date: 1954-1957
- Turbines: 14
- Installed capacity: 1,127 MW
- Annual generation: 5,170 GWh

McNary Dam is a 1.4-mile (2.2-km) long concrete gravity run-of-the-river dam which spans the Columbia River. It joins Umatilla County, Oregon with Benton County, Washington, 292 miles (470 km) upriver from the mouth of the Columbia. It is operated by the U.S. Army Corps of Engineers' McNary Lock and Dam office. The dam is located a mile (2 km) east of the town of Umatilla, Oregon, and 8 miles (13 km) north of Hermiston, Oregon. The dam was originally planned to be named Umatilla Dam, but the Flood Control Act of 1945 renamed the dam in honor of Senator Charles L. McNary of Oregon, who had died in February 1944.

The dam provides for slackwater navigation, hydroelectric power generation, recreation, wildlife habitat, and incidental irrigation.

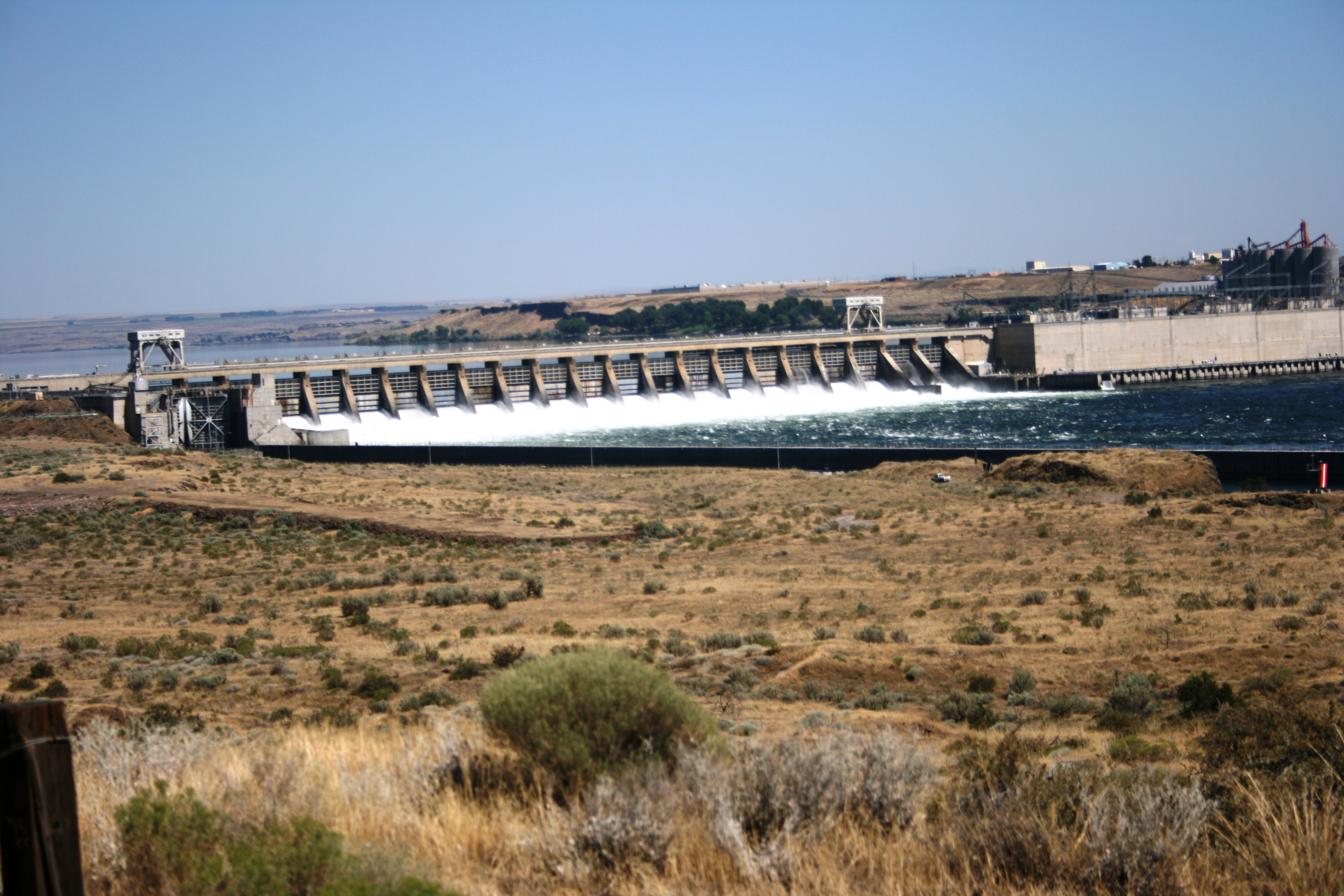
Water spilling at McNary Dam, seen from the Washington shore in July 2013.

Bills for the construction of a dam were introduced in the United States Congress as early as 1931. The United States House of Representatives rivers and harbors committee initially approved the project in April 1941; navigation, power generation, and national security were the major reasons cited for construction of the dam. Construction began in 1947, and was completed in 1954. Activation of all generating units was completed in 1957. Its capacity is 980 MW. There are two fish ladders for salmon and steelhead passage, one on each shore of the dam. The Washington side also has an 86-foot (26 m) wide, 683 foot (208 m) long navigation lock that lifts boats an average of 75 feet (23 m). The dam flooded the Umatilla Rapids, forming a reservoir called Lake Wallula. The lake extends 64 miles (103 km) up the Columbia to the US DOE Hanford Site. It also extends up the Snake River to Ice Harbor Dam.

As with some other dams, it has two additional turbines whose purpose is to power the dam itself. That is, this dam is entirely self-sustaining. In the event of a large-scale grid outage, McNary would provide the black start capability necessary to restart other generation facilities. These two "station service" turbines are only capable of providing about three MW, compared to the 70 MW each of the other 14 turbines produce. These two turbines alternate service duty to provide the dam with its energy requirements.

The dam is equipped with three large "fishway" pumps which provide water to supplement the mostly gravity-fed fish ladders. These units are constructed like smaller versions of the main turbines which run "in reverse."

McNary Dam is part of the Columbia River Basin system of dams and is one of fourteen hydropower facilities belonging to the Federal Columbia River Power System (FCRPS).

Stats:

- Altitude: 344 feet (105 m) above sea level
- Height: 183 feet (56 m)
- Length: 7,365 feet (2,245 m)
- Navigation lock:
  - Single-lift
  - 86 feet (26 m) wide
  - 683 feet (208 m) long
- Powerhouse
  - Fourteen 70,000-kilowatt units
  - Total capacity: 980 megawatts
  - Overload capacity: 1,127 MW
- Spillway
  - Gates: 22
  - Length: 1,310 feet (400 m)

== See also ==
- List of dams in the Columbia River watershed
- Hat Rock State Park
- Hydroelectric dams on the Columbia River
- List of lakes in Oregon
