= Hermiston High School =

Public school in Hermiston, Oregon, United States

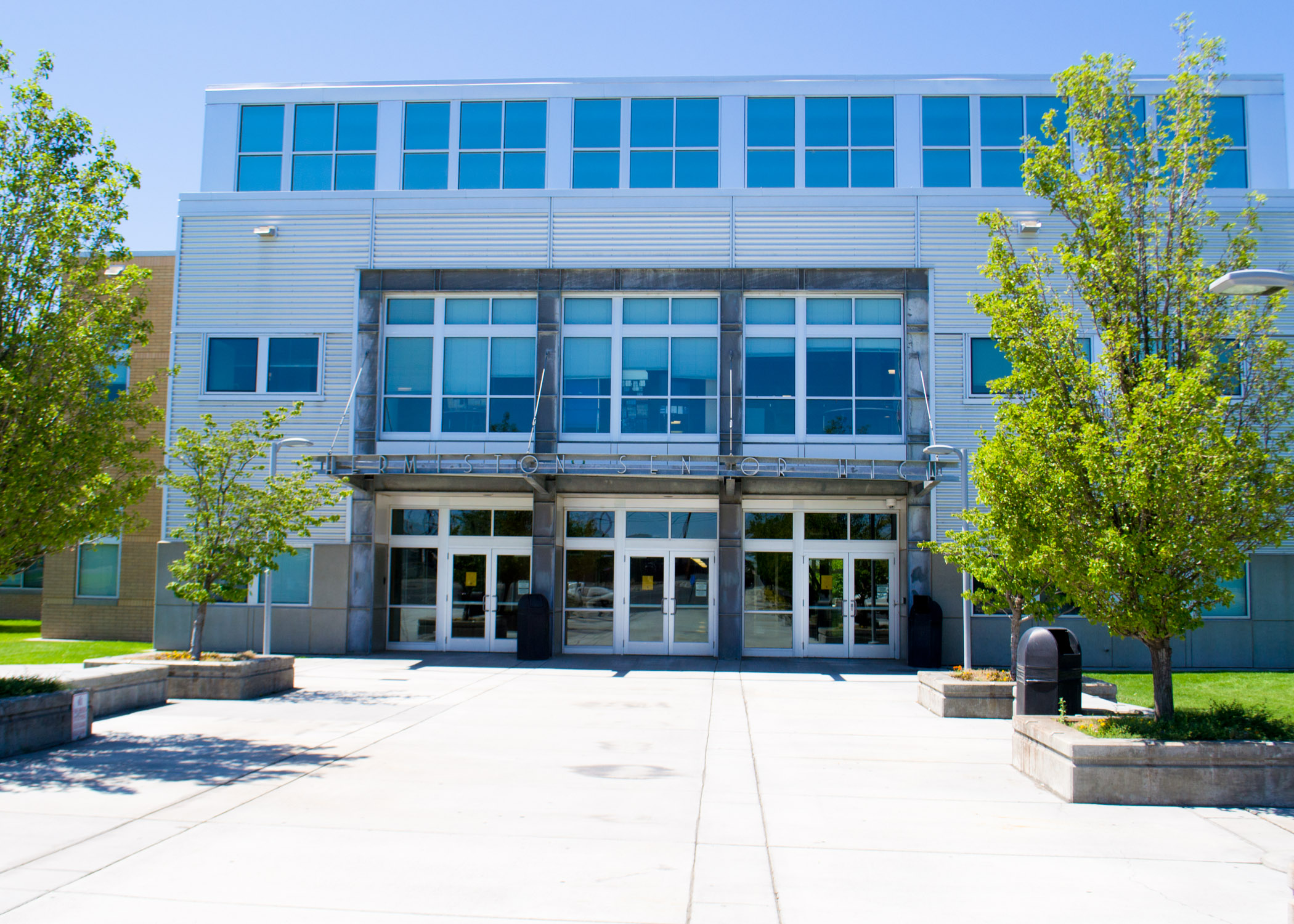

Location
- 600 S 1st Street; Hermiston, (Umatilla County), Oregon 97838; United States
- Coordinates: 45.835921°N 119.292882°W

Information
- Type: Public
- School district: Hermiston School District
- Principal: Tom Spoo
- Grades: 9-12
- Enrollment: 1,697 (2023-24)
- Colors: Purple and gold
- Athletics conference: WIAA 3A Mid-Columbia League
- Mascot: Bulldog
- Team name: Hermiston Bulldogs
- Website: Official website

Hermiston High School (HHS) is a four-year, public high school in Hermiston, Oregon, United States.

== Building ==
The main building is a seventy-classroom structure with computer laboratories, one large auditoriums, a library and physical education spaces. In 2016, three modulars were added to the layout in order to keep up with a rapidly increasing class size. A new parking lot was opened on January 2, 2018. The modulars were then removed and replaced with a parking lot and the new annex building was built during the summer and opened August 24, 2023

== Academics ==
In 2008, 81% of the school's seniors received a high school diploma. Of 273 students, 220 graduated, 33 dropped out, and 20 were still in high school the following year.

Hermiston High School works enables students to become "program completers". Blue Mountain Community College, based in Pendleton, Oregon, works with Hermiston High School in a dual enroll program to allow students to be simultaneously working for their high school degree as well as their AAOT, or Associate of Arts Oregon Transfer degree.

== Athletics ==
In 2017, Hermiston announced that it will begin competing in the Washington Interscholastic Activities Association in the 2018–19 school year. The decision was made in order to cut down on travel distances, especially when competing against teams in the Portland, Oregon area.

Hermiston's wrestling team has won ten championships in the state's 5A division. Its cross-country team won a state championship in 2010 and its American football team won a state championship in 2014.
