= List of radio stations in Oregon =

The following is a list of FCC-licensed radio stations in the U.S. state of Oregon, which can be sorted by their call signs, frequencies, cities of license, licensees, and programming formats.

== List of radio stations ==
Call sign	Frequency	City of License	Licensee	Format
KACI-FM	93.5 FM	The Dalles	Bicoastal Media Licenses IV, LLC	Classic hits
KAGI	930 AM	Grants Pass	Southern Oregon University	Public radio
KAGO	1150 AM	Klamath Falls	Basin Mediactive, LLC	News/Talk
KAGO-FM	94.9 FM	Altamont	Basin Mediactive, LLC	Mainstream rock
KAHG-LP	99.9 FM	Hood River	River of Life Assembly	Religious Teaching
KAIK	88.5 FM	Rockaway Beach	Educational Media Foundation	Worship music (Air1)
KAIS	90.3 FM	Salem	Educational Media Foundation	Worship music (Air1)
KAJC	90.1 FM	Salem	KAJC FM	Christian radio
KAJO	1270 AM	Grants Pass	Grants Pass Broadcasting Corporation	Soft AC/Classic hits/News/Talk
KAKT	105.1 FM	Phoenix	SMG-Medford, LLC	Country
KANL	90.7 FM	Baker City	American Family Association	Religious Talk (AFR)
KARO	98.7 FM	Nyssa	Educational Media Foundation	Worship music (Air1)
KAST	1370 AM	Astoria	OMG FCC Licenses LLC	News/Talk
KAVE	88.5 FM	Oakridge	Lane County School District 4J	Variety
KAYN-LP	92.9 FM	Bay City	Bay City Arts Center	Variety
KBAV-LP	103.9 FM	Coos Bay	Coos Bay Gospel Ministry, Inc.	Christian
KBBR	1340 AM	North Bend	Bicoastal Media Licenses III, LLC	Oldies
KBCH	1400 AM	Lincoln City	Pacific West Broadcasting, Inc.	Adult standards
KBDN	96.5 FM	Bandon	Bicoastal Media Licenses III, LLC	Country
KBFF	95.5 FM	Portland	Alpha Media Licensee LLC	Top 40 (CHR)
KBGE	94.9 FM	Cannon Beach	Captain Barbosa Media, LLC	Adult alternative
KBKR	1490 AM	Baker City	Pacific Empire Radio Corp.	News/Talk
KBKR-FM	95.3 FM	Baker City	Pacific Empire Radio Corp.	Classic hits
KBND	1110 AM	Bend	Combined Communications, Inc.	News/Talk
KBNP	1410 AM	Portland	KBNP Radio, Inc.	Business news
KBNW	1340 AM	Bend	Summit Broadcasting Group, LLC	News/Talk
KBOG-LP	97.9 FM	Bandon	Bandon Community Radio	Variety
KBOO	90.7 FM	Portland	The KBOO Foundation	Eclectic
KBOY-FM	95.7 FM	Medford	SMG-Medford, LLC	Classic rock
KBPS	1450 AM	Portland	School District #1, Multnomah County, Oregon	Educational
KBSF-LP	100.7 FM	Portland	Slavic Community Center of NW, Inc	Ethnic/Slavic
KBVM	88.3 FM	Portland	Catholic Broadcasting Northwest, Inc.	Catholic Religious
KBVR	88.7 FM	Corvallis	Oregon State University	College radio
KBWR-LP	98.1 FM	Burns	Desert Broadcasting, Inc.	Christian radio
KBXG	99.3 FM	Grants Pass	Bicoastal Media Licenses VI, LLC	Oldies
KBZY	1490 AM	Salem	Rise 95, LLC	Oldies
KCFM	1250 AM	Florence	Coast Broadcasting Company	Adult standards
KCGB-FM	105.5 FM	Hood River	Bicoastal Media Licenses IV, LLC	Hot adult contemporary
KCIW-LP	100.7 FM	Brookings	Curry Coast Community Radio	Variety
KCKX	1460 AM	Stayton	Iglesia Pentecostal Vispera del Fin	Regional Mexican
KCMB	104.7 FM	Baker City	KCMB, LLC	Country
KCMX-FM	101.9 FM	Ashland	SMG-Medford, LLC	Adult contemporary
KCNA	102.7 FM	Cave Junction	Opus Broadcasting Systems, Inc.	Classic hits
KCPB-FM	90.9 FM	Warrenton	Tillicum Foundation	Public radio
KCPL	90.5 FM	Astoria	Growing Christian Foundation	Christian radio
KCRF-FM	96.7 FM	Lincoln City	Pacific West Broadcasting, Inc.	Country
KCRX-FM	102.3 FM	Seaside	OMG FCC Licenses LLC	Classic rock
KCST-FM	106.9 FM	Florence	Coast Broadcasting Co., Inc.	Adult contemporary
KCUP	1230 AM	Toledo	Jacobs Radio Programming, LLC	Sports (ESPN)
KCUW-LP	104.3 FM	Pendleton	Confederated Tribes of the Umatilla Indian Reservation	Ethnic/Native American
KCYS	96.5 FM	Seaside	Jacobs Radio Programming, LLC	Country
KDCB	89.5 FM	Coos Bay	UCB USA, Inc.	Christian radio
KDCQ	92.9 FM	Coos Bay	Bay Cities Building Company, Inc.	Classic hits
KDGW-LP	96.5 FM	Grants Pass	Edgewater Christian Fellowship	Christian
KDJA	94.9 FM	Terrebonne	TheDove Media Inc.	Christian radio
KDJC	88.1 FM	Baker City	CSN International	Christian radio (CSN International)
KDLZ	101.5 FM	The Dalles	Educational Media Foundation	Contemporary Christian (K-Love)
KDOB	91.5 FM	Brookings	UCB USA, Inc.	Christian radio
KDOV	91.7 FM	Medford	UCB USA, Inc.	Christian radio
KDPO	91.9 FM	Port Orford	UCB USA, Inc.	Christian radio
KDSO	1300 AM	Phoenix	theDove Media, Inc.	Sports (VSiN)
KDUK-FM	104.7 FM	Florence	Bicoastal Media Licenses V, LLC	Top 40 (CHR)
KDXA	91.3 FM	Glendale	Common Frequency, Inc.	Silent
KEED	1450 AM	Eugene	Mielke Broadcasting Group	Classic country
KEFS	89.5 FM	North Powder	CSN International	Christian rock (Effect Radio)
KEGB-LP	102.1 FM	Bend	Everlasting Gospel Broadcasting Corporation	Christian radio
KEHK	102.3 FM	Brownsville	Cumulus Licensing LLC	Hot adult contemporary
KEJO	1240 AM	Corvallis	Bicoastal Media Licenses V, LLC	Sports (FSR)
KEPW-LP	97.3 FM	Eugene	Eugene Peaceworks	Variety
KEQB	97.7 FM	Coburg	McKenzie River Broadcasting Company, Inc.	Regional Mexican
KESY	91.9 FM	Baker City	Idaho Conference of Seventh-Day Adventists, Inc.	Contemporary Christian
KETP	88.7 FM	Enterprise	Oregon Public Broadcasting	Public radio
KEUB	93.3 FM	Gearhart	Jacobs Radio Programming, LLC	Active rock
KEUG	105.5 FM	Veneta	McKenzie River Broadcasting Company, Inc.	Adult hits
KEX	1190 AM	Portland	iHM Licenses, LLC	News/Talk
KFEG	104.7 FM	Klamath Falls	Cove Road Publishing LLC	Classic rock
KFFD-LP	98.3 FM	Beaverton	Freeform Portland	
KFFP-LP	90.3 FM	Portland	Radio 23	Variety
KFIR	720 AM	Sweet Home	Radio Fiesta Network, LLC	Talk
KFIS	104.1 FM	Scappoose	Caron Broadcasting, Inc.	Contemporary Christian
KFJL	1400 AM	Central Point	Go and Tell, Inc.	Christian radio
KFLS	1450 AM	Klamath Falls	Wynne Enterprises LLC	News/Talk
KFLY	101.5 FM	Corvallis	Bicoastal Media Licenses V, LLC	Country
KFSL-LP	99.5 FM	Fossil	Wheeler County Broadcasters Association	Variety
KFXX-FM	99.5 FM	Klamath Falls	Basin Mediactive, LLC	Classic hits
KFYL-LP	94.3 FM	La Grande	Valley Christian Radio Corp.	Christian
KGAL	1580 AM	Lebanon	Eads Broadcasting Corporation	News/Talk
KGBR	92.7 FM	Gold Beach	St. Marie Communications, Inc.	Classic hits
KGBZ-LP	102.5 FM	Madras	Central Oregon Educational Radio Corporation	Spanish
KGCL	90.9 FM	Jordan Valley	Educational Media Foundation	Gospel music
KGDD	1520 AM	Oregon City	Bustos Media Holdings, L.L.C.	Russian Christian
KGEL-LP	92.5 FM	Jasper	Laurelwood Academy, Inc.	Christian (LifeTalk Radio)
KGLS-LP	99.1 FM	Tillamook	Good Life Radio, Inc.	Christian
KGNR	91.9 FM	John Day	CSN International	Christian radio (CSN International)
KGON	92.3 FM	Portland	Audacy License, LLC	Classic rock
KGPZ-LP	106.7 FM	Grants Pass	SonSong Media	Religious
KGRI	88.1 FM	Lebanon	Educational Media Foundation	Worship music (Air1)
KGRV	700 AM	Winston	Pacific Cascade Communications Corporation	Christian radio
KHIC	98.5 FM	Keno	Basin Mediactive, LLC	Top 40 (CHR)
KHJJ-LP	105.3 FM	Albany	KHJJ Ltd.	Classic hits
KHKF	92.9 FM	Island City	KJDY, LLC	Classic rock
KHKO	102.9 FM	Prairie City	KJDY, LLC	Adult hits/Adult Top 40
KHPE	107.9 FM	Albany	Extra Mile Media, Inc.	Contemporary Christian
KHRB-LP	92.3 FM	Harrisburg	Rock Solid Ministries	Contemporary Christian
KHRV	90.1 FM	Hood River	Oregon Public Broadcasting	Public radio
KHSN	1230 AM	Coos Bay	W7 Broadcasting, LLC	Sports (ISN)
KHSS	100.7 FM	Athena	Two Hearts Communications, LLC	Catholic Religious
KICN-LP	96.7 FM	Portland	Vector Communications	Oldies
KIFS	107.5 FM	Ashland	Bicoastal Media Licenses VI, LLC	Rhythmic oldies
KIHR	1340 AM	Hood River	Bicoastal Media Licenses IV, LLC	Country
KINK	101.9 FM	Portland	Alpha Media Licensee LLC Debtor in Possession	Adult album alternative
KIPC-LP	107.1 FM	Pendleton	Pendleton Community Media	Variety
KISN-LP	95.1 FM	Portland	Western Oregon Radio Club, Inc.	Oldies
KITC-LP	106.5 FM	Gilchrist	Crescent/Gilchrist Community Action Team	Variety
KJAJ-LP	98.1 FM	Coos Bay	Coos Community Radio	Variety
KJCH	90.9 FM	Coos Bay	CSN International	Christian radio (CSN International)
KJCR-LP	107.9 FM	Grants Pass	His Mercy Radio, Inc.	Catholic
KJDY	1400 AM	John Day	KJDY, LLC	Country
KJDY-FM	94.5 FM	Canyon City	KJDY, LLC	Country
KJIV	96.5 FM	Madras	Openskyradio Corp.	Variety
KJKF	88.9 FM	Klamath Falls	Educational Media Foundation	Contemporary Christian (K-Love)
KJMX	99.5 FM	Reedsport	Bicoastal Media Licenses III, LLC	Classic rock
KKCW	103.3 FM	Beaverton	iHM Licenses, LLC	Adult contemporary
KKJA	89.3 FM	Redmond	CSN International	Christian radio (CSN International)
KKJC-LP	96.3 FM	McMinnville	Calvary Chapel of McMinnville, Inc.	Religious Teaching
KKKJ	105.5 FM	Merrill	Cove Road Publishing, LLC	Rhythmic contemporary
KKMX	104.3 FM	Tri City	Brooke Communications, Inc.	Adult hits
KKNU	93.3 FM	Springfield-Eugene	McKenzie River Broadcasting Company, Inc.	Country
KKNX	840 AM	Eugene	Mielke Broadcasting Group	Classic hits
KKOR	1230 AM	Astoria	OMG FCC Licenses LLC	Sports (ESPN)
KKRB	106.9 FM	Klamath Falls	Wynne Enterprises LLC	Soft adult contemporary
KKRZ	100.3 FM	Portland	iHM Licenses, LLC	Top 40 (CHR)
KKWA	96.3 FM	West Linn	Hope Media Group	Contemporary worship music
KKWL	97.7 FM	Butte Falls	Opus Broadcasting Systems, Inc.	Country
KLAD	960 AM	Klamath Falls	Basin Mediactive, LLC	Sports (ESPN)
KLAD-FM	92.5 FM	Klamath Falls	Basin Mediactive, LLC	Country
KLBM	1450 AM	La Grande	Pacific Empire Radio Corp.	News/Talk
KLBR	88.1 FM	Bend	Lane Community College	Variety
KLCC	89.7 FM	Eugene	Lane Community College	Variety
KLCO	90.5 FM	Newport	Lane Community College	Variety
KLCR	95.3 FM	Lakeview	Woodrow Michael Warren	Adult contemporary
KLDR	98.3 FM	Harbeck-Fruitdale	Grants Pass Broadcasting Corp.	Hot adult contemporary
KLDZ	103.5 FM	Medford	Bicoastal Media Licenses VI, LLC	Soft AC/Oldies
KLFO	88.1 FM	Florence	Lane Community College	Variety
KLFR	89.1 FM	Reedsport	Lane Community College	Variety
KLJN	105.9 FM	Coos Bay	Coos Radio Incorporated	Oldies
KLKF	100.7 FM	Malin	Educational Media Foundation	Contemporary Christian (K-Love)
KLKY	96.1 FM	Stanfield	Jacobs Radio Programming, LLC	Classic rock
KLLF-LP	106.7 FM	Roseburg	Airwaves of Truth	Christian
KLMD	101.1 FM	Talent	Educational Media Foundation	Contemporary Christian (K-Love)
KLMF	88.5 FM	Klamath Falls	Southern Oregon University	Classical music
KLON	90.3 FM	Tillamook	Educational Media Foundation	Contemporary Christian (K-Love)
KLOO	1340 AM	Corvallis	Bicoastal Media Licenses V, LLC	News/Talk
KLOO-FM	106.3 FM	Corvallis	Bicoastal Media Licenses V, LLC	Classic rock
KLOV	89.3 FM	Winchester	Educational Media Foundation	Contemporary Christian (K-Love)
KLRF	88.5 FM	Milton-Freewater	Stateline Seventh-Day Adventist Church	Christian radio
KLRR	101.7 FM	Redmond	Combined Communications, Inc.	Adult album alternative
KLTH	106.7 FM	Lake Oswego	iHM Licenses, LLC	Classic hits
KLVP	97.9 FM	Aloha	Educational Media Foundation	Contemporary Christian (K-Love)
KLVU	107.1 FM	Sweet Home	Educational Media Foundation	Contemporary Christian (K-Love)
KLXG	91.1 FM	Grants Pass	Educational Media Foundation	Contemporary Christian (K-Love)
KLYC	1260 AM	McMinnville	Richard Mason	Classic hits
KLYF-LP	100.7 FM	Coquille	Coquille Christian Radio, Inc.	Christian
KMAB-LP	99.3 FM	Madras	The Gibbons School	Christian
KMCQ-LP	94.3 FM	Salem	Friends of Marion County	
KMED	106.3 FM	Eagle Point	Bicoastal Media Licenses VI, LLC	News/Talk
KMGE	94.5 FM	Eugene	McKenzie River Broadcasting Company, Inc.	Adult contemporary
KMGX	100.7 FM	Bend	GCC Bend, LLC	Classic rock
KMHD	89.1 FM	Gresham	Mt. Hood Community College District	Jazz
KMHS	1420 AM	Coos Bay	Coos Bay School District No. 9	Classic country
KMHS-FM	91.3 FM	Coos Bay	Coos Bay School District No. 9	Variety
KMME	100.5 FM	Cottage Grove	Catholic Broadcasting Northwest, Inc.	Catholic Religious
KMPQ	88.1 FM	Roseburg	Lane Community College	Variety
KMSW	92.7 FM	The Dalles	Bicoastal Media Licenses IV, LLC	Classic rock
KMTK	99.7 FM	Bend	Combined Communications, Inc.	Country
KMUN	91.9 FM	Astoria	Tillicum Foundation	Public radio
KMUZ	88.5 FM	Turner	Willamette Information, News, and Entertainment Service	Variety
KMWR	90.7 FM	Brookings	Pacific Cascade Communications Corporation	Contemporary Christian
KNCP-LP	107.3 FM	La Pine	Lapine Frontier Days Association	Variety
KNCU	92.7 FM	Newport	Pacific West Broadcasting, Inc.	Country
KNHK-FM	101.9 FM	Weston	Alexandra Communications, Inc.	Classic country
KNLR	97.5 FM	Bend	Cowan Broadcasting LLC	Contemporary Christian
KNLX	104.9 FM	Prineville	Cowan Broadcasting LLC	Contemporary Christian
KNND	1400 AM	Cottage Grove	Reiten Communications, LLC	Classic country
KNRQ	103.7 FM	Harrisburg	Cumulus Licensing LLC	Alternative rock
KNUM-LP	96.7 FM	Portland	Community Alliance of Tenants	Rap/Hip hop
KOAB-FM	91.3 FM	Bend	Oregon Public Broadcasting	Public radio
KOAC	550 AM	Corvallis	Oregon Public Broadcasting	Public radio
KOAC-FM	89.7 FM	Astoria	Oregon Public Broadcasting	Public radio
KOAP	88.7 FM	Lakeview	Oregon Public Broadcasting	Public radio
KOBK	88.9 FM	Baker City	Oregon Public Broadcasting	Public radio
KOBN	90.1 FM	Burns	Oregon Public Broadcasting	Public radio
KOCF-LP	92.7 FM	Veneta	The Oregon Country Fair	Variety
KODL	1440 AM	The Dalles	Larson-Wynn, Inc	Classic country
KODZ	99.1 FM	Eugene	Bicoastal Media Licenses V, LLC	90s/2000s hits
KOGL	89.3 FM	Gleneden Beach	Oregon Public Broadcasting	Public radio
KOHI	1600 AM	St. Helens	The Mountain Broadcasting LLC	Talk/Sports
KOHU	1360 AM	Hermiston	Westend Radio, LLC	Classic country
KOJD	89.7 FM	John Day	Oregon Public Broadcasting	Public radio
KOLH-LP	105.9 FM	Hermiston	Hermiston Catholic Radio	Catholic
KOOR	1010 AM	Milwaukie	Bustos Media Holdings, L.L.C.	Spanish Rhythmic Top 40
KOOS	107.3 FM	North Bend	Bicoastal Media Licenses III, LLC	Hot adult contemporary
KOOZ	94.1 FM	Myrtle Point	Southern Oregon University	Classical music
KOPB	1600 AM	Eugene	Oregon Public Broadcasting	Public radio
KOPB-FM	91.5 FM	Portland	Oregon Public Broadcasting	Public radio
KORC-LP	105.9 FM	Corvallis	Community Airwaves	
KORE	1050 AM	Springfield-Eugene	KORE Broadcasting, LLC	Sports (FSR)
KORV	93.5 FM	Lakeview	M&J Radio, LLC	Classic country
KOTD	89.7 FM	The Dalles	Oregon Public Broadcasting	Public radio
KOTU-LP	107.7 FM	Riddle	Pioneer Christian Radio, Inc.	Religious (Radio 74 Internationale)
KPAI-LP	103.1 FM	Paisley	Paisley High School	Variety
KPAM	1640 AM	Lake Oswego	Salem Media of Oregon, Inc.	Talk
KPCN-LP	95.9 FM	Woodburn	Pineros y Campesinos Unidos del Noroeste	Spanish
KPDQ	800 AM	Portland	Salem Media of Oregon, Inc.	Christian radio
KPDQ-FM	93.9 FM	Portland	Salem Media of Oregon, Inc.	Christian radio
KPFR	89.5 FM	Pine Grove	Family Stations, Inc.	Christian radio (Family Radio)
KPIJ	88.5 FM	Junction City	CSN International	Christian radio (CSN International)
KPIK-LP	96.5 FM	Stayton	Santiam Community Radio Corporation	Oldies
KPNW	1120 AM	Eugene	Bicoastal Media Licenses V, LLC	News/Talk
KPOJ	620 AM	Portland	iHM Licenses, LLC	Sports (FSR)
KPOR	90.3 FM	Welches	Educational Media Foundation	Spanish religious
KPOV-FM	88.9 FM	Bend	Women's Civic Improvement League, Inc.	Variety
KPPK	98.3 FM	Rainier	Bicoastal Media Licenses IV, LLC	Adult hits
KPPT-FM	100.7 FM	Depoe Bay	PACNW Broadcasting, LLC	Classic hits
KPRP-LP	99.1 FM	Portland	Portland Radio Project	Variety
KQAC	89.9 FM	Portland	All Classical Public Media, Inc.	Classical music
KQAK	105.7 FM	Bend	Horizon Broadcasting Group LLC	Classic hits
KQDL	89.1 FM	Hines	CSN International	Christian radio (CSN International)
KQEN	1240 AM	Roseburg	Brooke Communications, Inc.	News/Talk
KQFE	88.9 FM	Springfield	Family Stations, Inc.	Christian radio (Family Radio)
KQFM	93.7 FM	Hermiston	Westend Radio, LLC	Adult contemporary
KQHR	88.1 FM	The Dalles	All Classical Public Media, Inc.	Classical music
KQMI	88.9 FM	Manzanita	All Classical Public Media, Inc.	Classical music
KQOC	88.1 FM	Gleneden Beach	All Classical Public Media, Inc.	Classical music
KQRR	1130 AM	Mount Angel	Bustos Media Holdings, L.L.C.	Russian Christian
KQRZ-LP	100.7 FM	Tigard	Oregon Amateur Radio Club, Inc.	Oldies
KQUA-LP	99.7 FM	Roseburg	Umpqua Watersheds, Inc.	Alternative
KRAD-LP	94.9 FM	Millersburg	Transformation International, Inc.	Christian
KRBM	90.9 FM	Pendleton	Oregon Public Broadcasting	Public radio
KRCO	690 AM	Prineville	Horizon Broadcasting Group LLC	Sports (FSR)
KRCO-FM	95.7 FM	Prineville	Horizon Broadcasting Group LLC	Classic country
KRDM	1240 AM	Redmond	Red Mountain Broadcasting, LLC	Regional Mexican
KRHR	95.1 FM	Odell	SeaSound Broadcasting, LLC	
KRJT	105.9 FM	Elgin	Pacific Empire Radio Corp.	Classic hits
KRJW	1240 AM	Altamont	Cove Road Publishing, LLC	Regional Mexican
KRKT-FM	99.9 FM	Albany	Bicoastal Media Licenses V, LLC	Country
KRLZ	93.7 FM	Waldport	Richard A Linn	Hot adult contemporary
KRNZ	88.7 FM	Sandy	Educational Media Foundation	Spanish Christian (Radio Nueva Vida)
KROG	96.9 FM	Grants Pass	Opus Broadcasting Systems, Inc.	Active rock
KRRC-LP	94.3 FM	Rogue River	Faith Lutheran Church	Religious Teaching
KRRM	94.7 FM	Rogue River	Grants Pass Broadcasting Corp	Classic country
KRSB-FM	103.1 FM	Roseburg	Brooke Communications, Inc.	Country
KRSK	1080 AM	Portland	Audacy License, LLC	Sports (ESPN)
KRSK-FM	105.1 FM	Molalla	Audacy License, LLC	Sports (ESPN)
KRTA	610 AM	Medford	Opus Broadcasting Systems, Inc.	Regional Mexican
KRVM	1280 AM	Eugene	Lane County School District 4J	Public radio
KRVM-FM	91.9 FM	Eugene	Lane County School District No. 4J	Variety
KRWL-LP	97.7 FM	Coquille	Coquille School District	Variety
KRWQ	100.3 FM	Gold Hill	Bicoastal Media Licenses VI, LLC	Country
KRXF	92.9 FM	Bend	GCC Bend, LLC	Alternative rock
KRYN	1230 AM	Gresham	Centro Familiar Cristiano	Regional Mexican
KRYP	93.1 FM	Gladstone	Salem Media of Oregon, Inc.	Regional Mexican
KSBA	88.5 FM	Coos Bay	Southern Oregon University	Variety
KSEP-LP	99.9 FM	Brookings	Anchor Network	Christian
KSHD-LP	94.3 FM	Shady Cove	City of Shady Cove	Variety
KSHL	97.5 FM	Lincoln Beach	Richard A. Linn	Country
KSHO	920 AM	Lebanon	Eads Broadcasting Corporation	Adult standards
KSHR-FM	97.3 FM	Coquille	Bicoastal Media Licenses III, LLC	Country
KSJJ	102.9 FM	Redmond	GCC Bend, LLC	Country
KSJK	1230 AM	Talent	Southern Oregon University	Public radio)
KSKF	90.9 FM	Klamath Falls	Southern Oregon University	Variety
KSKQ	89.5 FM	Ashland	Multicultural Association of Southern Oregon	Variety
KSKR	1490 AM	Roseburg	Brooke Communications, Inc.	Sports (ISN)
KSKR-FM	100.9 FM	Sutherlin	Brooke Communications, Inc.	Top 40 (CHR)
KSLC	90.3 FM	McMinnville	All Classical Public Media, Inc.	Classical music
KSLM	1220 AM	Salem	KCCS, LLC	Talk
KSMF	89.1 FM	Ashland	Southern Oregon University	Variety
KSND	95.1 FM	Monmouth	Bustos Media Holdings, LLC	Regional Mexican
KSOR	90.1 FM	Ashland	Southern Oregon University	Classical music
KSOW-LP	106.7 FM	Cottage Grove	Real Rural Radio	Variety
KSPL-LP	98.1 FM	John Day	Valley View Broadcasting, Inc.	Christian
KSRG	88.3 FM	Ashland	Southern Oregon University	Classical music
KSRS	91.5 FM	Roseburg	Southern Oregon University	Classical music
KSRV-FM	96.1 FM	Ontario	Iliad Media Group Holdings Inc.	Adult hits
KSWB	840 AM	Seaside	KSWB Productions, LLC	Classic hits
KSXM-LP	105.5 FM	Salem	Salem Moon Music	Variety
KSYD	92.1 FM	Reedsport	Lane County School District 4J	Variety
KTBR	950 AM	Roseburg	Southern Oregon University	Public radio
KTCB	89.5 FM	Tillamook	Tillicum Foundation	Public radio
KTDS	1300 AM	The Dalles	Bicoastal Media Licenses IV, LLC	Country
KTEC	89.5 FM	Klamath Falls	Oregon State Board of Higher Education	College radio
KTEE	94.9 FM	North Bend	Bicoastal Media Licenses III, LLC	Modern adult contemporary
KTHH	990 AM	Albany	Bicoastal Media Licenses V, LLC	Comedy
KTIL	1590 AM	Netarts	Alexandra Communications, Inc.	Classic rock
KTIL-FM	95.9 FM	Bay City	Alexandra Communications, Inc.	Country
KTIX	1240 AM	Pendleton	EMG2, LLC	Classic country
KTJN-LP	101.1 FM	Gold Beach	Totally Jesus Network, Inc.	Christian
KTMK	91.1 FM	Tillamook	Oregon Public Broadcasting	Public radio
KTMT	580 AM	Ashland	SMG-Medford, LLC	Sports (ISN)
KTMT-FM	93.7 FM	Medford	SMG-Medford, LLC	Contemporary Christian
KTUP	98.3 FM	Dallas	Mano a Mano Family Center	
KTVR-FM	90.3 FM	La Grande	Oregon Public Broadcasting	Public radio
KTWS	98.3 FM	Bend	Combined Communications, Inc.	Mainstream rock
KUBQ	98.7 FM	La Grande	Pacific Empire Radio Corp.	Country
KUFO	970 AM	Portland	Alpha Media Licensee LLC	Talk
KUGN	590 AM	Eugene	Cumulus Licensing LLC	News/Talk
KUJZ	95.3 FM	Creswell	Cumulus Licensing LLC	Sports (ISN)
KUMA	1290 AM	Pendleton	EMG2, LLC	News/Talk
KUMA-FM	92.1 FM	Pilot Rock	EMG2, LLC	Classic hits
KUMP-LP	107.9 FM	Days Creek	Umpqua Christian Radio	Religious (Radio 74 Internationale)
KUPL	98.7 FM	Portland	Alpha Media Licensee LLC	Country
KUPO-LP	105.5 FM	Port Orford	Battle Rock Communications, Inc.	Classic hits
KURT	93.7 FM	Prineville	H&H Broadcasting, LLC	Worship music
KURY	910 AM	Brookings	Bicoastal Media Licenses II, LLC	Adult standards
KURY-FM	95.3 FM	Brookings	Bicoastal Media Licenses II, LLC	Classic hits
KVBE-LP	91.1 FM	Portland	Asian Pacific American Network of Oregon	Variety
KVBL	103.1 FM	Union	KJDY, LLC	Talk/Sports
KVLB	90.5 FM	Bend	Educational Media Foundation	Contemporary Christian (K-Love)
KVLQ	90.1 FM	La Pine	Educational Media Foundation	Contemporary Christian (K-Love)
KVRA	89.3 FM	Sisters	Educational Media Foundation	Worship music (Air1)
KVRN-LP	101.5 FM	Portland	Cascade Community Radio	Adult hits/Modern AC/Classic hits
KWAX	91.1 FM	Eugene	University of Oregon	Classical music
KWBY	940 AM	Woodburn	Bustos Media Holdings, LLC	Regional Mexican
KWCQ	106.1 FM	Condon	Jacobs Radio Programming	Adult Top 40
KWHT	103.5 FM	Pendleton	EMG2, LLC	Country
KWIL	790 AM	Albany	Extra Mile Media, Inc.	Christian radio
KWIP	880 AM	Dallas	Valley Broadcasting Associates, LLC	Regional Mexican
KWJJ-FM	99.5 FM	Portland	Audacy License, LLC	Country
KWMG-LP	99.9 FM	White City	Wordcaster, Inc.	Variety
KWPB-LP	98.7 FM	Newport	Winds of Praise Broadcasting	Christian
KWPK-FM	104.1 FM	Sisters	Horizon Broadcasting Group LLC	Modern adult contemporary
KWRL	102.3 FM	La Grande	KWRL, LLC	Hot adult contemporary
KWRO	630 AM	Coquille	Bicoastal Media Licenses III, LLC	News/Talk
KWRX	88.5 FM	Redmond	University of Oregon	Classical music
KWRZ	92.3 FM	Canyonville	Brooke Communications, Inc.	Sports (ISN)
KWSO	91.9 FM	Warm Springs	Confederated Tribes Warm Springs Reservation	Native American
KWVA	88.1 FM	Eugene	University of Oregon	Freeform
KWVN-FM	107.7 FM	Pendleton	EMG2, LLC	Top 40 (CHR)
KWVR	1340 AM	Enterprise	Wallowa Valley Radio, LLC	News/Talk
KWVR-FM	92.1 FM	Enterprise	Wallowa Valley Radio, LLC	Country
KWVZ	91.5 FM	Florence	University of Oregon	Classical music
KWXS	107.7 FM	Prineville	Combined Communications, Inc.	Adult standards
KXCJ-LP	105.7 FM	Cave Junction	KXCJ-LP	Variety
KXCR	90.7 FM	Florence	KXCR Community Radio Partners	Variety
KXIX	94.1 FM	Sunriver	GCC Bend, LLC	Top 40 (CHR)
KXJM	107.5 FM	Banks	iHM Licenses, LLC	Classic hip hop
KXL-FM	101.1 FM	Portland	Alpha Media Licensee LLC	News/Talk
KXOR	660 AM	Junction City	Iglesia de Cristo Ministerio Llamada Final, Inc.	Spanish religious
KXPD	1040 AM	Tigard	Pin Investments, Inc.	Chinese
KXRU-LP	105.5 FM	Portland	Portland Russian Media Center	Variety
KXRY	91.1 FM	Portland	Cascade Educational Broadcast Service	Community radio
KXTG	750 AM	Portland	Alpha Media Licensee LLC	Sports (ISN)
KYAC	90.1 FM	Mill City	Santiam Hearts to Arts	Community radio
KYAQ	97.1 FM	Siletz	Firebare, Inc.	Variety
KYCH-FM	97.1 FM	Portland	Audacy License, LLC	Adult hits
KYJJ	94.1 FM	Boardman	Xana HD Solutions, LLC	Regional Mexican
KYKN	1430 AM	Keizer	Willamette Broadcasting Co., Inc.	News/Talk
KYOR	88.9 FM	Newport	Family Stations, Inc.	Christian radio (Family Radio)
KYQT-LP	101.5 FM	Portland	Friends of Portland Community Radio	Adult hits/Modern AC/Classic hits
KYSF	97.5 FM	Bonanza	Educational Media Foundation	Worship music (Air1)
KYSO	88.7 FM	Selma	Educational Media Foundation	Worship music (Air1)
KYTE	105.5 FM	Garibaldi	Alexandra Communications, Inc.	Hot adult contemporary
KYTT-FM	98.7 FM	Coos Bay	Lighthouse Radio Group	Christian radio
KZAS-LP	95.1 FM	Hood River	Radio Tierra	Spanish
KZBY	90.5 FM	Coos Bay	Southern Oregon University	Classical music
KZEL-FM	96.1 FM	Eugene	Cumulus Licensing LLC	Classic rock
KZGD	1390 AM	Salem	Iglesia Pentecostal Vispera del Fin	Regional Mexican
KZHC	1230 AM	Burns	KJDY, LLC	Hot adult contemporary
KZHC-FM	92.7 FM	Burns	KJDY, LLC	Country
KZLY	99.5 FM	Ione	Noemy Rodriguez	Regional Mexican
KZTB	97.9 FM	Milton-Freewater	Bustos Media Holdings, LLC	Regional Mexican
KZUN-LP	95.1 FM	Helvetia	Radio Galaxy Broadcasting, Inc.	Oldies
KZZR	94.3 FM	Government Camp	Bustos Media Holdings, L.L.C.	Regional Mexican

== Defunct ==
- KCHC
- KCMX
- KDUN
- KEOL
- KEX-FM
- KEZX
- KGG
- KGMW-LP
- KKPZ
- KMWV
- KNPT
- KPAM (860 AM)
- KQCF
- KSCR
- KTOD-LP
- KUBE (1050 AM) was a radio station located in Pendleton, Oregon, United States, which broadcast between July 19, 1956, and July 13, 1964, with its license deleted on January 4, 1965. The station was owned by John M. Carroll and managed by R. E. "Bob" Tomlinson. It was Pendleton's third radio station. Tomlinson, a Navy veteran, had previously worked for Portland's KGW television station. He later managed KATR (Eugene), KSHA (Medford), KAPT (Salem), and KEST (Boise). Other stations using those call letters include KJR-FM, broadcasting as KUBE FM from 1982-2016 and 2018-2022, KTDD (FM), which used the KUBE call letters in 2016-2017, and KUBE (AM), whose call letters were adopted from KJR-RM starting in 2022.
- KUIK
- KWDP
- KXET
- KYAC-LP
- KYTE (102.7 FM)
- KYVL
- KZZF-LP

== See also ==
- Lists of Oregon-related topics
- List of television stations in Oregon
- Radio in the United States
