= KTMK =

- Tillamook, Oregon; United States
- Frequency: 91.1 MHz

Programming
- Format: Public/news/talk
- Affiliations: NPR, PRX, APM

Ownership
- Owner: Oregon Public Broadcasting
- Sister stations: KOAC, KOAP, KOBK, KOGL, KOPB, KOPB-FM, KOTD, KRBM, KTVR-FM

History
- First air date: 2005
- Call sign meaning: Tillamook

Technical information
- Licensing authority: FCC
- Facility ID: 91082
- Class: A
- ERP: 140 watts
- HAAT: 356 meters (1168 feet)
- Transmitter coordinates: 45°27′59″N 123°55′11″W

Links
- Public license information: Public file; LMS
- Webcast: Listen live
- Website: www.opb.org

KTMK (91.1 FM) is a non-commercial educational radio station licensed to serve Tillamook, Oregon, United States. The station is owned by Oregon Public Broadcasting.

KTMK broadcasts a public radio news/talk format. The station airs programs from National Public Radio, Public Radio Exchange, American Public Media, and other public radio syndicates.

== History ==
The Tillicum Foundation received the original construction permit for this station from the Federal Communications Commission on July 29, 2002. The new station was assigned the KTMK call sign by the FCC on March 20, 2003.

In August 2002, the Tillicum Foundation reached an agreement to sell this station to Oregon Public Broadcasting. The deal was approved by the FCC on October 1, 2002, and the transaction was consummated on January 16, 2003. KTMK received its license to cover from the FCC on February 14, 2006.
