= KOPB =

KOPB may refer to:

- KOPB (AM), a radio station (1600 AM) licensed to Eugene, Oregon, United States
- KOPB-FM, a radio station (91.5 FM) licensed to Portland, Oregon, United States
- KOPB-TV, a television multiplex (channel 10) licensed to Portland, Oregon, United States
