= KOAC =

KOAC may refer to:

- KOAC (AM), a radio station (550 AM) licensed to Corvallis, Oregon, United States
- KOAC-FM, a radio station (89.7 FM) licensed to Astoria, Oregon, United States
- KOAC-TV, a television station (channel 7 analog/39 digital) licensed to Corvallis, Oregon, United States
- Kuwait Oxygen and Acetylene Company, a subsidiary of Gulf Cryo
