= KSHL =

KSHL may refer to:

- KSHL (FM), a radio station (97.5 FM) licensed to serve Lincoln Beach, Oregon, United States; see List of radio stations in Oregon
- KRLZ, a radio station (93.7 FM) licensed to serve Waldport, Oregon, which held the call sign KSHL in 2016; see List of radio stations in Oregon
- KEQB, a radio station (97.5 FM) licensed to serve Gleneden Beach, Oregon, which held the call sign KSHL from 1991 to 2016
