= KMHD =

Non-profit radio station in Gresham, Oregon

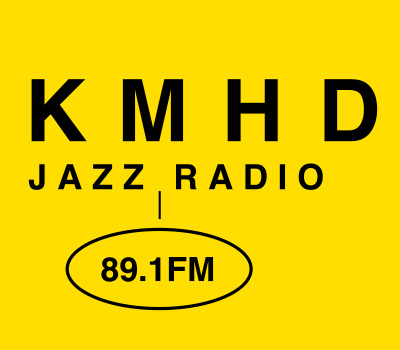
- Gresham, Oregon; United States
- Broadcast area: Portland-Salem, Oregon; Vancouver, Washington
- Frequency: 89.1 MHz (HD Radio)

Programming
- Format: Jazz
- Subchannels: HD2: Alternative rock "KMHD2"

Ownership
- Owner: Mt. Hood Community College; (Mt. Hood Community College District)
- Operator: Oregon Public Broadcasting

History
- First air date: 1984
- Call sign meaning: Mount Hood Community College

Technical information
- Licensing authority: FCC
- Facility ID: 46719
- Class: C2
- ERP: 7,900 watts horizontal; 100,000 watts vertical
- HAAT: 437 meters (1,434 ft)
- Transmitter coordinates: 45°30′58″N 122°43′59″W

Links
- Public license information: Public file; LMS
- Webcast: Listen live; Listen live (HD2)
- Website: kmhd.org

KMHD (89.1 FM) is a listener-supported, non-profit FM broadcast radio station in Portland, Oregon. For the first 25 years of its operation, the station's studio was located on the Mt. Hood Community College campus in Gresham, Oregon, before moving to OPB's studios. Its transmitter is on the Tualatin Mountains.

In addition to its broadcast signal at 89.1, KMHD also simulcasts locally on an HD channel and through streaming audio on the station's website. KMHD's main programming is carried on OPB-FM subchannel HD3 and on SAP audio channel 3 of OPB-TV digital subchannel 4. Additionally, it can be heard in the Bend area on KOAB 91.3 FM, subchannel HD2.

Although owned by Mt. Hood Community College, the station has never been a part of the college's radio broadcasting educational program.

== History ==
The station has been providing the Portland, Oregon community with jazz and blues since 1984 using volunteer announcers - many of them prominent local musicians or broadcasters - almost entirely since its inception.

In March 2009, the Mt. Hood Community College District Board of Education agreed to transfer the station's programming, operational and fundraising responsibilities to Oregon Public Broadcasting. The agreement was a response to a cut in state support. The transfer was approved by the Board of Education in mid-May and took effect on August 10, 2009, at 2:00 p.m. Although the station's programming originates from OPB's Portland studios, the station continues to use its original call letters and broadcast frequency and continues to be owned by Mt. Hood Community College.

== KMHD-HD2 ==
KMHD-HD2 (branded as "KMHD2") aired a college radio format, including blocks of hip hop, rock, metal, world, and indie music. After local radio station KZME ceased broadcasting on 91.1, KMHD began carrying them on their HD2 digital radio subchannel. KMHD-HD2 is not carried by OPB's FM or TV audio subchannels.
