= List of Oregon Public Broadcasting podcasts =

The table below lists current and former programs produced by Oregon Public Broadcasting that have been released as podcasts.

Title	Release date	Subject	Ended?	Ref.
Bundyville	May 15, 2018	News	Yes	
Class of 2025	June 3, 2014	Education	No	
The Evergreen	February 5, 2024	News	No	
The Fault Line: Dying For A Fight	September 12, 2021	News	Yes	
Growing Oregon	July 15, 2022	Politics	Yes	
Hush	September 4, 2024	News	No	
OPB Politics Now	May 6, 2008	Politics	No	
Relative Fiction	March 28, 2021	Arts and Culture	Yes	
Salmon Wars	March 13, 2024	Environment	Yes	
Starting a Riot	June 15, 2023	Arts and Culture	Yes	
Think Out Loud	January 22, 2008	News	No	
This Land Is Our Land	September 1, 2016	News	Yes	
Timber Wars	September 21, 2020	Environment	Yes	
