= Oregon Art Beat =

American television show

Oregon Art Beat is a weekly television show that airs on Oregon Public Broadcasting (OPB). Oregon Art Beat features Oregon musicians, artists, and cultural events. Oregon Art Beat was created in 1999 by Jeff Douglas, a longtime radio broadcaster in Portland, Oregon who had been hired at Oregon Public Broadcasting (OPB) as a producer. He was working on Oregon Field Guide when he started producing stories for a new show about the arts in Oregon. He became the executive producer of the program and remained on the show until he promoted Jessica Martin, a longtime producer at the station, to succeed him in 2009.

In 2014, Oregon Art Beat collaborated with artist Chris Haberman and his People's Art gallery in downtown Portland, Oregon to showcase artists from the first 15 seasons of the show. Notable Oregonians who have been featured in the series include painter James Lavadour, the band Pink Martini, the late US poet laureate William Stafford, sci-fi author Ursula LaGuin, children's author Beverly Cleary; places like the Portland Art Museum, the Jordan Schnitzer Museum, and annual events like Art in the Pearl and Art in the High Desert. More than 900 artists and arts organizations have been presented since the show debuted in 1999.
