= KSLM =

KSLM may refer to:

- KSLM (AM), a radio station (1220 AM) licensed to serve Salem, Oregon, United States
- KSLM-LD, a low-power digital television station in Salem, Oregon
- KZGD, a radio station (1390 AM) in Salem, Oregon, known as KSLM from 1934 to 2007
- KLM (human-computer interaction), aka "Keystroke-Level Model", a hard science approach to human–computer interaction
