= KSHO-TV =

KSHO-TV may refer to:

- KSHO-TV (Las Vegas), ABC station started 1956 (known as KTNV since 1980)
- KSHO-TV (Honolulu), TBN station started 1982 (known as KAAH-TV since 2003)

== See also ==
- KSHO, American AM radio station ("Unforgettable 920") in Lebanon, Oregon, started 1950 as KGAL
