= KXIQ =

KXIQ may refer to:

- KXIQ-LP, a low-power radio station (105.1 FM) licensed to serve Brownsville, Texas, United States
- WGUE (AM), a radio station (1180 AM) licensed to serve Turrell, Arkansas, United States, which held the call sign KXIQ from 2012 to 2014
- KRXF, a radio station (92.9 FM) licensed to serve Bend, Oregon, United States, which held the call sign KXIQ from 1974 to 1995
