= KRBM =

KRBM may refer to:

- KRBM (FM), a radio station (90.9 FM) licensed to Pendleton, Oregon, United States
- Robinson Army Airfield in Little Rock, Arkansas (ICAO code KRBM)
