= KTUP =

KTUP may refer to:

- KTUP (FM), a radio station (98.3 FM) licensed to serve Dallas, Oregon, United States
- Tupelo Regional Airport
