= Oregon Field Guide =

Television series

- Created by: Steve Amen
- Presented by: Ed Jahn
- Theme music composer: Cal Scott
- No. of seasons: 27

Production
- Executive producer: Ed Jahn
- Producers: Ed Jahn; Jule Gilfillan; Ian McCluskey; Aaron Scott
- Cinematography: Todd Sonflieth; Nick Fisher; Michael Bendixen; Stephani Gordon; Brandon Swanson

Original release
- Network: KOPB-TV
- Release: 1990 – present

Oregon Field Guide is a weekly television program produced by Oregon Public Broadcasting focusing on recreation, the outdoors, and environmental issues in the state of Oregon. The show has become part of the Oregon zeitgeist. Steve Amen is the show's creator and original Executive Producer. Ed Jahn, producer with Oregon Field Guide since 2000, became host and Executive Producer in 2016/2017 upon Steve Amen's retirement. Named for the field guides used to identify plants, animals, and natural phenomenon, the wide-ranging series covers Oregon natural history, outdoor recreation, conservation, agriculture, rural life, and other local subjects. The program additionally outputs roughly 13 half-hour episodes and specials per year.

== History ==
Oregon Field Guide started as a partnership between Oregon Public Broadcasting (OPB) and the Oregon Department of Fish and Wildlife. The pilot first aired in 1989. The program became the sole production of OPB with the series premier in 1990, which began with the impact of drift netting for tuna on dolphins. Using the information from this story, Amen also produced an award-winning Frontline episode, titled "To The Last Fish", which aired in 1991. Oregon Field Guide was kept during major state budget cuts in 2003 that affected OPB. In that year, the show budget was $300,000, with the majority of funding coming from the viewers.

Most stories are narrated by the lead producer/reporter, though Executive Producers Ed Jahn and Steve Amen have also narrated reports produced by others. Jim Newman produced over 250 Oregon Field Guide segments, and was brought on when Amen got the greenlight on the series.

From the series premier in 1990, Oregon Field Guide remains one of the highest rated of any locally produced PBS show in the nation, and The Oregonian called it "the crown jewel in OPB's otherwise lackluster record of locally produced programming." In 1998, the show was the most-watched local TV series in the PBS system.

Past producers/reporters include Jim Newman, Steve Lobel, Eric Cain, Jessica Martin, Vince Patton and Jeff Douglas.

== Awards ==
The show's producers Vince Patton and Ed Jahn have received awards from the Society of Environmental Journalists for "Outstanding Beat/In-Depth Reporting, Television". Patton received an award for his reporting in the episode "Marmot Dam," and Jahn for his reporting in "Biscuit Fire Recovery" and "The Silent Invasion." When presenting the award for reporting on the Marmot Dam removal, the society recognized Oregon Field Guide, stating:

To watch these stories was to be there in the moment, experiencing it as it happened. Simply beautiful storytelling. Oregon Field Guide showed us things this panel had never heard of. More important, this program did what documentaries do best. They made a point to stay after everybody else left. By doing that, they were able to report beyond the headlines and were able to prove everybody wrong.

The show has won eight Regional Emmys. One was in 1995 for the "outstanding informational series/magazine short format division", and another in the "best public affairs special" in 1998 for their one-hour special titled "Willamette Water Quality".

It also received two Golden Eagle awards from the Council on International Nontheatrical Events in 1994: one for an hourlong report on "Cleaning Up Hanford", and the other for "Abuses of the 1872 Mining Law". The latter report also received an honorable mention in the Public Affairs category of the Pacific Mountain Network's "Best of the West" awards in that year.

== Notable segments ==
Oregon Field Guide has filmed while diving in Spirit Lake, titled "Ecological Mysteries of Spirit Lake". It showed the rebirth of the lake after the 1980 eruption of Mount St. Helens.

Other notable coverage includes the Bull Run watershed, the near-extinct bighorn sheep, mountain unicycling, and how Estacada High School students used Cycle Oregon's visit to raise funds for their school.

=== The Silent Invasion ===
The Silent Invasion was an OPB documentary production studying the threats posed by invasive species in the state. It was produced and written by Ed Jahn. The documentary focused on the influence of Yellow star thistle, Quagga mussels, Spartina and English ivy, among other invasive species. The production involved a campaign and outreach component that included the Oregon Invasive Species Council (OISC) and SOLV Oregon. The ultimate goal of the special was to serve as a wake-up call about invasive species and to inspire citizens to take action.

The special won a silver baton level Alfred I. duPont–Columbia University Award The award jury was "struck by the boldness and courage of OPB to attack such issues and then to put resources against it." It also received three Regional Emmys.
