= KLCC (FM) =

Radio station in Eugene, Oregon, US

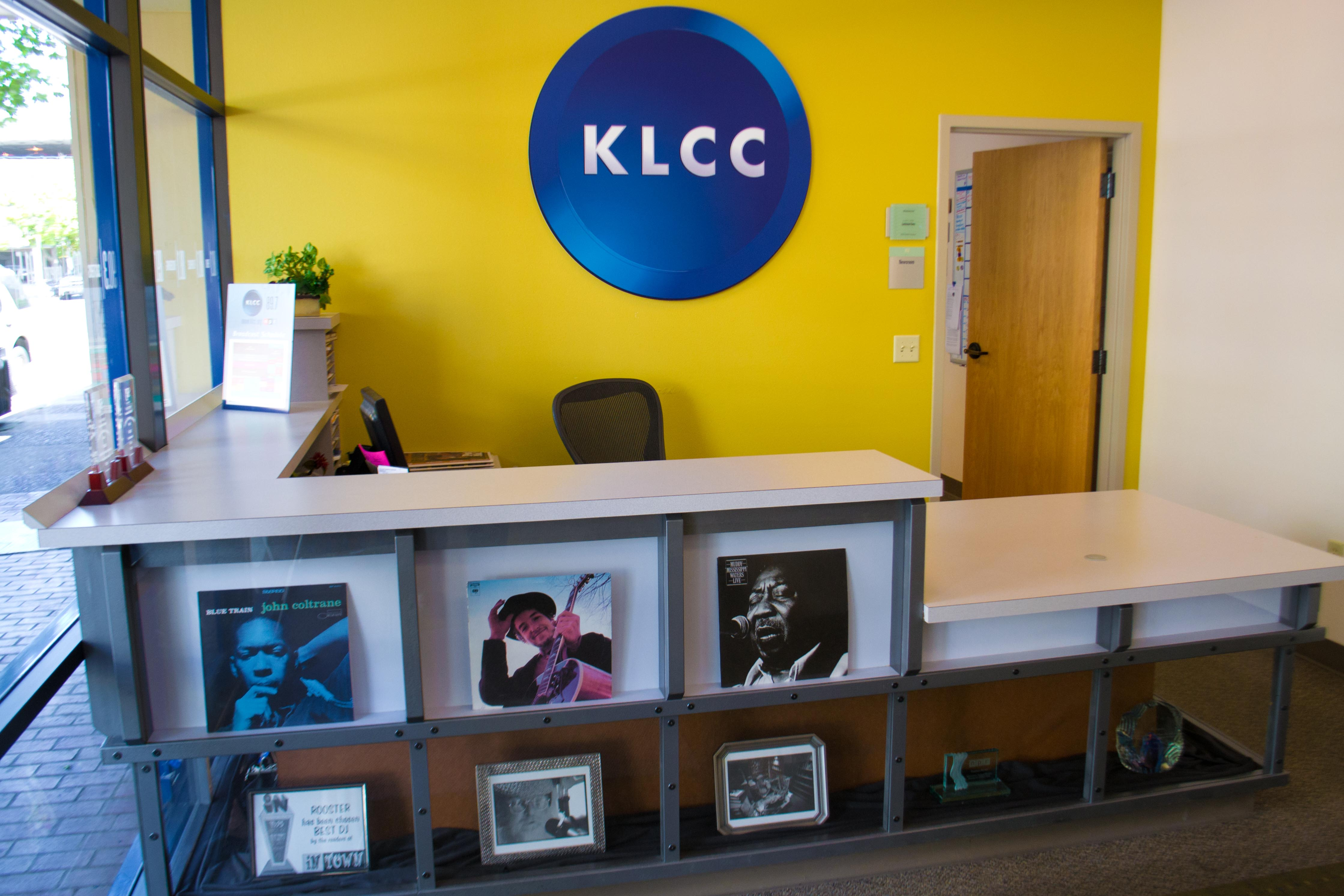
- Eugene, Oregon; United States
- Broadcast area: Lane County, Oregon
- Frequency: 89.7 MHz (HD Radio)
- Branding: KLCC 89.7

Programming
- Format: Public radio
- Affiliations: NPR

Ownership
- Owner: Lane Community College

History
- First air date: February 17, 1967
- Former call signs: KPNW (1967)
- Former frequencies: 90.3 MHz (1967–1979)
- Call sign meaning: Lane Community College

Technical information
- Licensing authority: FCC
- Facility ID: 36522
- Class: C0
- ERP: 81,000 watts (horiz.); 54,000 watts (vert.)
- HAAT: 354 meters (1,161 ft)
- Transmitter coordinates: 44°00′05″N 123°06′48″W
- Translators: 91.5 K218AE (Cottage Grove); 91.5 K218AG (Oakridge); 103.9 K280BH (Riddle); 90.3 K212AS (Sisters)
- Repeaters: 88.1 KLBR (Bend); 88.1 KLFO (Florence); 90.5 KLCO (Newport); 89.1 KLFR (Reedsport); 88.1 KMPQ (Roseburg)

Links
- Public license information: Public file; LMS
- Webcast: Listen Live
- Website: klcc.org

KLCC (89.7 FM) is a National Public Radio member station based in Eugene, Oregon. It operates on various other repeater frequencies at other cities in Western, Southern and Central Oregon. The station is licensed to Lane Community College.

KLCC started broadcasting in 1967, bringing a locally-focused noncommercial station to Eugene for the first time. It also gave much of southern Eugene a clear signal for educational programming. While KOAC in Corvallis, flagship of Oregon Educational and Public Broadcasting Service (OEPBS, now Oregon Public Broadcasting), easily covered most of Eugene, much of the southern portion is shielded by Eugene's rugged terrain.

Originally known as KPNW, the call sign was changed to KLCC on August 7, 1967. In 1971, KLCC became a charter member of National Public Radio, airing NPR's All Things Considered. KLCC is noteworthy for its award-winning news department and eclectic evening music shows, ranging from jazz to folk to traditional African/Caribbean.

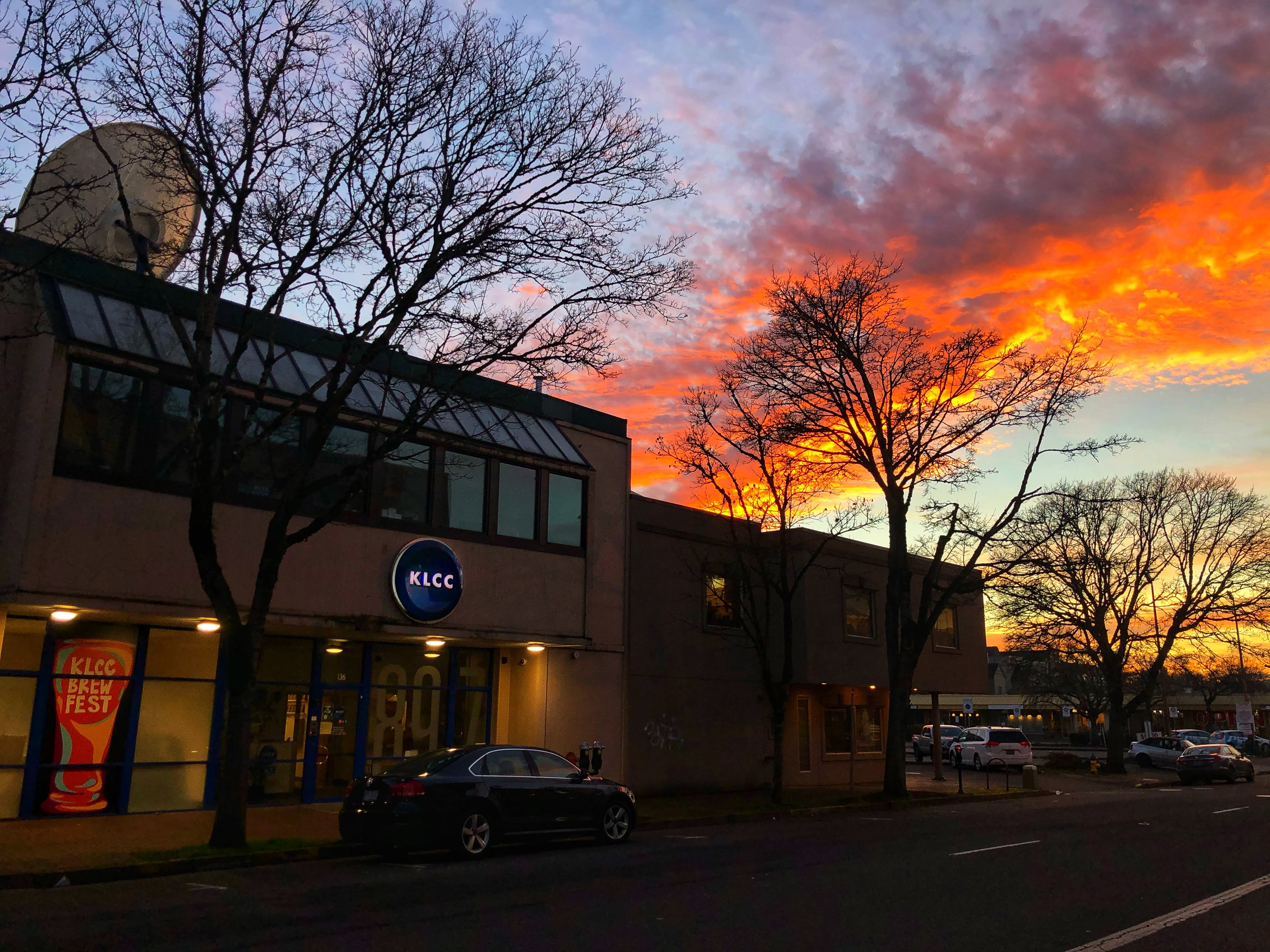
Sunset over KLCC in downtown Eugene.

Weekday programming formerly included Fresh Tracks, which featured a diverse blend of musical genres. In 2011, Fresh Tracks ended its 22-year run on KLCC.

In late 2013, KLCC expanded its weekday news and information programming, featuring public radio programs beginning at 4 am with NPR's Morning Edition. Other daily programs include Here and Now, The Takeaway, OPB's Think Out Loud, Fresh Air, PRI's The World, The Daily (podcast) and All Things Considered.

Weekdays at 7 pm, KLCC airs long-form, narrative based shows like Reveal, Radiolab, This American Life and Throughline.

Seven days a week, evening music programming is a blend of jazz, folk, Americana, blues, Celtic, and world music shows. Saturday night features Dead Air, a tribute to the area's connection with the Grateful Dead.

In 2019, the Northwest Passage Podcast was created to summarize the week's news for listeners and offer a behind the scenes look at the KLCC News Department. In 2020, during the COVID-19 pandemic, News Director Rachael McDonald originated The Friday Show, a weekly call-in show that gave listeners an opportunity to ask COVID-19-related questions to representatives from the Lane County Public Health Department.

Many lawmakers and politicians have approached KLCC to help them connect with constituents. The most recent and notable example is when U.S. Senator Ron Wyden (D-OR) gave his 1,000th town hall meeting on Feb. 24, 2022 where he connected virtually with Lane County residents from KLCC.

KLCC has won several regional and national awards for reporting, including ones from RTDNA, Public Media Journalists Association (PMJA) and the Native American Journalists Association (NAJA).

KLCC serves over 101,000 people each week and an average of 120,000 people monthly from their station in downtown Eugene and reaches listeners throughout Southern, Western and Central Oregon, from Newport & Florence to Bend, Roseburg, Salem & Corvallis.

In the fall of 2021, for the first time in its history, KLCC achieved a #1 rating according to Nielsen data, with a rating of 9.3 in the Eugene/Springfield metro area, and 6.3 in the total service area.
