= Michael Husain =

Michael Husain is an American documentary filmmaker, director, and producer based in Indianapolis, Indiana.

He is the founder of Pathway Productions, an Indianapolis-based production company he established in 1996, which produced work for networks including ESPN, A&E, VH1, and Discovery Channel. His documentary work has received multiple Emmy Awards and recognition at the Heartland Film Festival, where several of his films have won awards including the Crystal Heart Award and the Indiana Spotlight Award.

Husain's notable works include the ESPN Films 30 for 30 short Slick, Nancy and the Telethon (2016), the feature documentary The Addict's Wake (2021) about opioid and meth addiction in Brown County, Indiana, and The Waiting Game (2024), a documentary about former ABA players' pursuit of pensions and medical benefits following the ABA–NBA merger.

== Early life and education ==
Husain was raised in Indiana. His father was a professor at Indiana State University, and his mother was a scientist. He was the youngest of three siblings. He attended Indiana University, where he earned degrees in telecommunications and political science.

== Career ==
=== Early career ===
After college, Husain began his career in broadcasting. He briefly worked as a newscaster at an NBC affiliate in Louisville, Kentucky, but left the position in 1987. He then started a publishing business that produced newspaper-style fliers for public restrooms. He later moved into documentary production and joined Oregon Public Broadcasting as a producer.

A turning point in his career came after meeting journalist and producer Bill Kurtis. Husain moved to Chicago to work with Kurtis on A&E’s Investigative Reports. In the 1990s, he and his wife returned to Indiana, where he prepared to start his own production company.

=== Pathway Productions ===
In 1996, Husain founded Pathway Productions in Indianapolis in the basement of his Indianapolis home. The company later moved from Broad Ripple to a downtown Indianapolis loft in 2004. In 1999, ESPN commissioned Pathway to produce documentaries on auto racing figures A.J. Foyt, Al Unser Sr., and Mario Andretti. Husain also worked on ESPN’s SportsCentury and multiple episodes of A&E’s Biography and American Justice. He was among the early writers and producers associated with the launch of American Justice. By the 2000s, Pathway had produced work for A&E, VH1, ESPN, and Discovery Channel, as well as for the NCAA, Butler University, and Eli Lilly and Company. It also expanded into web design and interactive media, acquired Verso Media, and opened a satellite office in Chicago.

During this period, Husain and Pathway received industry recognition, including Emmy Awards. One of his notable independent films, The Innocent (2005), examined the lives of wrongfully convicted former death-row inmates. It was featured at the Heartland Film Festival, where it won the Crystal Heart Award, and it also received the Jury Prize for Best Non-Fiction Film at the Indianapolis International Film Festival.

In early 2008, Husain sold a majority stake in Pathway Productions to Indianapolis businessman William "Bill" Mays. Jerald Harkness became the company's new CEO. Husain retained a minority stake and remained involved briefly in a creative role but left the company in July 2008.

=== Later career ===
After leaving Pathway, Husain founded Good Vibes Media in Indianapolis. Through that company and other independent work, he continued producing and directing documentaries, often focused on historical and social subjects connected to Indiana.

In the 2010s, Husain worked on several television projects, including the ESPN Films 30 for 30 short Slick, Nancy and the Telethon, about the 1977 telethon that helped save the Indiana Pacers franchise. He also served as executive producer of Living Fresh, a wellness and sustainability series on Discovery's Home channel.

Husain later co-directed and co-produced The Addict’s Wake, a feature documentary about opioid and meth addiction in Brown County, Indiana. The film premiered at the 2021 Heartland International Film Festival, where it won the Indiana Spotlight Award.

In 2024, Husain wrote and directed The Waiting Game, a documentary about the Dropping Dimes Foundation's effort to secure pensions and medical benefits for former ABA players excluded from the NBA pension plan after the ABA–NBA merger. The film features Julius Erving, Spencer Haywood, Bob Costas, and Harry Edwards. It premiered on October 18, 2024, at the Heartland International Film Festival and won the Indiana Spotlight Documentary Audience Choice Award.
