= KPPT-FM =

- Depoe Bay, Oregon; United States
- Broadcast area: Newport-Lincoln City, Oregon
- Frequency: 100.7 MHz (HD Radio)
- Branding: 100.7 The Otter

Programming
- Format: Classic hits

Ownership
- Owner: Jeff Montgomery; (PACNW Broadcasting, LLC)

History
- First air date: December 1980 (as KCEL at 107.1)
- Former call signs: KCEL (1980–1986); KTDO-FM (1986–1990); KZUS (1990–1992); KZUS-FM (1992–1997)
- Former frequencies: 107.1 MHz (1980–1990)

Technical information
- Licensing authority: FCC
- Facility ID: 642
- Class: C2
- ERP: 17,500 watts
- HAAT: 255 meters
- Transmitter coordinates: 44°45′23″N 124°03′01″W

Links
- Public license information: Public file; LMS
- Webcast: Listen Live
- Website: otterrockradio.com

KPPT-FM (100.7 FM) is a radio station broadcasting a classic hits format. Licensed to Depoe Bay, Oregon, United States, the station is currently owned by Jeff Montgomery, through licensee PACNW Broadcasting, LLC.

== History ==
The station went on the air December, 1980 as KCEL at 107.1 FM, Toledo, under the ownership of Charles A. Farmer, who also owned the sole Toledo AM station, KTDO. Through the 1980s and mid-1990s the two stations broadcast the same program.

KCEL changed its call sign to KTDO-FM on January 1, 1986, mirroring its AM sister station KTDO.

On July 2, 1990, it moved frequencies from 107.1 to 100.7 and changed its call sign to KZUS.

On February 10, 1992, its call sign became KZUS-FM, as its AM sister station had changed its call sign to KZUS.

On October 10, 1997, it took on its current call sign, KPPT-FM, again along with its sister station. The two station formats diverged, with KPPT-FM changing to classic rock.

On October 1, 2020, KPPT-FM rebranded as "100.7 The Otter", shifting from 1960s-70s to 1970s–1980s hits.
