= KXIX =

Radio station in Sunriver, Oregon

Coordinates: 44.047°N 121.532°W

- Sunriver, Oregon; United States
- Broadcast area: Bend, Oregon
- Frequency: 94.1 MHz
- Branding: Power 94

Programming
- Format: Top 40 (CHR)
- Affiliations: Premiere Networks; Westwood One

Ownership
- Owner: Gross Communications Corporation; (GCC Bend, LLC)
- Sister stations: KSJJ, KMGX, KRXF

History
- First air date: 2006 (as KRXF at 92.7)
- Former call signs: KKCU (11/02/2006-11/20/2006, CP); KRXF (2006–2010)
- Former frequencies: 92.7 MHz (2006–2010)

Technical information
- Licensing authority: FCC
- Facility ID: 165965
- Class: C2
- ERP: 18,500 watts
- HAAT: 248 meters

Links
- Public license information: Public file; LMS
- Webcast: Listen Live
- Website: power94.fm

KXIX (94.1 FM) is a commercial top 40 (CHR) music radio station in Sunriver, Oregon.
