= KZME =

Coordinates: 45.329°N 121.711°W

KZME-FM
- United States
- Broadcast area: Portland, Oregon
- Branding: KZME

Programming
- Language: English
- Format: Defunct, was Local Music

Ownership
- Owner: MetroEast Community Media

History
- First air date: Fall 2011

Technical information
- Licensing authority: FCC
- Facility ID: 176013

Links
- Public license information: Public file; LMS

KZME-FM was a radio station in Portland, Oregon. A playlist and the call sign were broadcast from KQAC's HD2 channel. KQAC HD2 served as another signal for the station for some time prior to KZME going silent. Notable regular DJs and personnel were Dennise Kowalczyk, James Dineen, Aron Howell and audio engineer David Elkin-Bram.

== History ==
KZME went on the air in the autumn of 2010 and gathered steadily increasing listenership due to its unique music programming. Most of the programming consisted of local Portland-based and Pacific Northwest original music which found favor with local listeners seeking alternatives to the standard chain-radio fare of most other music-oriented radio stations in the greater Portland area. Occasional volunteer DJs played music live on the air, with daytime gaps and nights consisting of pre-programmed local music. Occasional guest DJs, like Dr. Demento (when he appears in Portland each winter), did live shows on the station also. The format of the station leaned toward pop and rock, which dominates daytime programming, but occasionally showcased alternative local music such as electronic, ambient, industrial, rap, ethnic, and experimental music on some evenings and weekends. The station was located in Gresham, Oregon just east of Portland and its transmitter (translator) antenna was located in the west hills of Portland, reaching most of the Portland-area Willamette Valley and to most of greater Vancouver, Washington and Clark County just across the Columbia River. Its former FM stereo broadcasting signal had 28 watts of power. KZME also streamed on the internet.

=== End of 91.1 & 107.1 FM ===
KZME went silent on its original 91.1 FM frequency on October 3, 2011, and the station's license expired on October 4, 2012, as a result of remaining dark for more than a year. On February 5, 2014, the KZME call sign was deleted from the FCC database. On August 28, 2014, the KZME programming ended on translator K296FT 107.1 FM. MetroEast Community Media, as owners of KZME's assets, penned an agreement with newly-formed radio station XRAY.FM to lease the 107.1 license. Programming from XRAY's originating channel KXRY 91.1 FM would begin to be simulcast on 107.1 on September 22, 2014, greatly expanding their broadcast reach. Numerous KZME programmers would also migrate their programs to the fledgling station, including DJ Klyph's Welcome to the Neighborhood, James Dineen's Sessions from the Box, Dave Cantrell's Songs from Under the Floorboard, JBJ's Hello Cruel World, and Kristin Belz's Music for Neighbors. XRAY.FM continues to operate both 91.1 and 107.1 FM to this day.
