= KNLX =

- Prineville, Oregon; United States
- Broadcast area: Bend, Oregon
- Frequency: 104.9 MHz
- Branding: New Life 104.9

Programming
- Format: Contemporary Christian

Ownership
- Owner: Cowan Broadcasting LLC
- Sister stations: KNLR

History
- First air date: 2008
- Former call signs: KWDP (2006–2008, CP)

Technical information
- Licensing authority: FCC
- Facility ID: 164309
- Class: C2
- ERP: 860 watts
- HAAT: 675 meters (2215 feet)
- Transmitter coordinates: 44°26′13″N 120°57′11″W

Links
- Public license information: Public file; LMS
- Website: KNLX Online

KNLX (104.9 FM, "New Life 104.9") is a commercial radio station allocated to serve Prineville, Oregon, United States. The station, which began regular broadcasting in 2008, is currently owned by Cowan Broadcasting LLC. The KNLX signal also covers the metropolitan area of Bend, Oregon; in addition, New Life Radio also has another radio station, KNLR, in Bend Oregon.

== Programming ==
KNLX broadcasts a Contemporary Christian music and teaching format. KNLX programming is a simulcast of sister station KNLR except from 11:00 AM to 1:00 PM when KNLX airs The Dave Ramsey Show.

== History ==
This station received its original construction permit from the Federal Communications Commission on June 9, 2005. The new station was assigned the call letters KWDP by the FCC on March 29, 2006.

In February 2008, Horizon Christian Fellowship reached an agreement to transfer the construction permit to Cowan Broadcasting LLC. The transfer was approved by the FCC on April 18, 2008, and the transaction was consummated on April 30, 2008. During the sale, the station applied to the FCC for new call letters and the station was assigned the current KNLX call letters by the FCC on April 10, 2008.

The station's second application for a license to cover was accepted for filing on July 7, 2008. As of September 24, 2009, the Commission has taken no further action on this license application, pending a licensing issue with KRSK (105.1 FM) in Salem, Oregon.
