= KGAL =

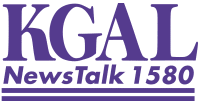
- Lebanon, Oregon; United States
- Broadcast area: Mid–Willamette Valley
- Frequency: 1580 kHz
- Branding: NewsTalk 1580

Programming
- Format: Talk radio
- Affiliations: CBS News Radio; Fox News Radio; Westwood One Sports Network; Compass Media Networks; Premiere Networks; Salem Radio Network; Townhall News; Westwood One

Ownership
- Owner: Eads Broadcasting Corporation
- Sister stations: KSHO

History
- First air date: November 20, 1995
- Call sign meaning: Gordon Allen (original owner of KSHO)

Technical information
- Licensing authority: FCC
- Facility ID: 18039
- Class: B
- Power: 5,000 watts (day); 1,000 watts (night)
- Transmitter coordinates: 44°34′25″N 122°55′05″W

Links
- Public license information: Public file; LMS
- Webcast: Listen live
- Website: kgal.com

KGAL (1580 AM, "NewsTalk 1580") is a commercial radio station licensed to Lebanon, Oregon, United States, and serving the Mid–Willamette Valley. It airs a talk format and is owned by the Eads Broadcasting Corporation.

The studios and transmitter are on KGAL Drive in Lebanon, off Santiam Highway SE (U.S. Route 20).

== History ==
=== Early years ===
The Eads Broadcasting Corporation received the original construction permit for this station from the Federal Communications Commission (FCC) on December 27, 1994. The new station was given the call sign KGAL by the FCC on January 23, 1995. KGAL received its license to cover from the FCC on November 20, 1995.

KGAL was one of two radio stations in 1997 broadcasting the games of the Portland Forest Dragons of the Arena Football League. That team would ultimately leave Portland after the 1999 season.

=== A Moment in Oregon History ===
Throughout 2009, KGAL and sister station KSHO aired a series of one-minute historical vignettes as part of Oregon's sesquicentennial celebration. The program, titled A Moment in Oregon History, highlights notable Oregon residents and key historical events. Each of the 240 vignettes was written by author Rick Steber.

=== Awards and honors ===
Eads Broadcasting owner Charlie Eads was the Broadcaster of the Year in Oregon and was honored as Volunteer of the Year at the 2009 Ovation Awards given out at the annual Northwest Festivals and Events Conference. Eads was cited for his work with the Willamette Valley Concert Band, the Linn County Cultural Coalition, and several other community organizations.

== Programming ==
KGAL features nationally syndicated talk shows with local news updates and weekend sports. KGAL carries Seattle Seahawks football along with Lebanon High School football and basketball games.
