= KNLR =

Contemporary Christian radio station in Bend, Oregon

Coordinates: 44.077°N 121.331°W

- Bend, Oregon; United States
- Broadcast area: Bend, Oregon
- Frequency: 97.5 MHz (HD Radio)
- Branding: New Life Radio

Programming
- Format: Christian Contemporary
- Subchannels: HD2: Spanish Christian "La Luz Radio"

Ownership
- Owner: Terry A. Cowan
- Sister stations: KNLX

History
- First air date: January 1, 1985
- Call sign meaning: K New Life Radio

Technical information
- Licensing authority: FCC
- Facility ID: 65261
- Class: C1
- ERP: 97,000 watts horiz 42,000 watts vert
- HAAT: 163 meters
- Translators: 95.9 K240AW (Burns); 95.9 K240BX (Christmas Valley); 103.3 K277BH (Madras); HD2: 106.1 K291CJ (Bend)

Links
- Public license information: Public file; LMS
- Webcast: Listen Live
- Website: knlr.com

KNLR is a commercial Christian contemporary music radio station in Bend, Oregon, broadcasting on 97.5 FM.
