= KYAC (FM) =

- Mill City, Oregon; United States
- Broadcast area: Mill City, Oregon
- Frequency: 90.1 MHz
- Branding: The Voice Of the Santiam Canyon

Programming
- Format: Community radio/Americana

Ownership
- Owner: Santiam Hearts to Arts

Technical information
- Licensing authority: FCC
- Facility ID: 762665
- Class: A
- ERP: 500 watts
- HAAT: −211 meters (−692 ft)
- Transmitter coordinates: 44°45′05″N 122°31′45″W

Links
- Public license information: Public file; LMS
- Website: http://www.kyacfm.org

KYAC (90.1 MHz) is a community radio station in Mill City, Oregon. It is owned and operated by Santiam Hearts to Arts.

The station had previously operated as a LPFM radio station at 94.9 MHz. Its owners surrendered KYAC-LP's license to the Federal Communications Commission on February 16, 2022. Licensees are not allowed to hold an interest in both full-power and low-power stations at the same time. The FCC canceled KYAC-LP's license on February 20.
