= KMGX =

Radio station in Bend, Oregon

- Bend, Oregon; United States
- Broadcast area: Bend, Oregon
- Frequency: 100.7 MHz
- Branding: The X 100.7

Programming
- Format: Classic rock
- Affiliations: Premiere Networks

Ownership
- Owner: Gcc Bend, LLC
- Sister stations: KRXF, KSJJ, KXIX

History
- First air date: July 4, 1973 (as KICE)
- Former call signs: KQHV (1973, CP); KICE (1973–2000)

Technical information
- Licensing authority: FCC
- Facility ID: 59691
- Class: C1
- ERP: 50,000 watts
- HAAT: 158 meters
- Transmitter coordinates: 44°04′40″N 121°19′49″W

Links
- Public license information: Public file; LMS
- Webcast: Listen Live
- Website: The X 100.7 Online

KMGX (100.7 FM) is a radio station broadcasting a classic rock format. Licensed to Bend, Oregon, United States, the station serves the Bend area. The station is currently owned by Gcc Bend, LLC.

On January 30, 2023 at 6 am, KMGX changed its format from adult contemporary to classic rock, branded as "The X 100.7".
