= KHRV =

Coordinates: 45.662°N 121.472°W

- Hood River, Oregon; United States
- Frequency: 90.1 MHz

Programming
- Format: Public radio; news/talk
- Affiliations: National Public Radio; American Public Media; Public Radio International

Ownership
- Owner: Oregon Public Broadcasting

History
- First air date: 2002
- Call sign meaning: Hood River

Technical information
- Licensing authority: FCC
- Facility ID: 90769
- Class: A
- ERP: 65 watts
- HAAT: 227 meters (745 ft)
- Translator: 94.3 K232CK (Hood River)

Links
- Public license information: Public file; LMS
- Webcast: Listen live
- Website: www.opb.org

KHRV (90.1 FM) is a radio station licensed to Hood River, Oregon. The station is owned by Oregon Public Broadcasting, and airs OPB's news and talk programming, consisting of syndicated programming from NPR, APM and PRX, as well as locally produced offerings.

== FM translator ==
KHRV programming is also heard on an FM translator on 94.3 MHz.

| Call sign | Frequency | City of license | FID | ERP (W) | HAAT | Class | FCC info |
|---|---|---|---|---|---|---|---|
| K232CK | 94.3 FM | Hood River, Oregon | 50600 | 40 | 372.2 m (1,221 ft) | D | LMS |
