= KHPE =

Contemporary Christian radio station in Eugene–Albany, Oregon

- Albany, Oregon; United States
- Broadcast area: Willamette Valley
- Frequency: 107.9 MHz
- Branding: HOPE 107.9 FM

Programming
- Format: Christian contemporary

Ownership
- Owner: Extra Mile Media, Inc.
- Sister stations: KWIL

History
- First air date: January 12, 1969
- Former call signs: KWIL-FM (1969–1972)
- Call sign meaning: "Hope"

Technical information
- Licensing authority: FCC
- Facility ID: 838
- Class: C
- ERP: 100,000 watts
- HAAT: 354 meters (1,161 ft)
- Transmitter coordinates: 44.646°N 123.271°W
- Translator: 96.9 K245AA (Eugene)

Links
- Public license information: Public file; LMS
- Webcast: Listen live
- Website: hope1079.com

KHPE (107.9 FM, "Hope 107.9") is a commercial radio station licensed to Albany, Oregon, United States, serving the Willamette Valley. It is owned by Extra Mile Media and features a Christian Contemporary format. The studios are located on Santiam Highway SE (U.S. Route 20).

The transmitter tower is on Northwest Cardinal Drive at Nettleton Road in Lewisburg. The signal covers Corvallis, Lebanon, Salem, and Eugene–Springfield, Oregon. Programming is also heard in Eugene-Springfield on 250-watt FM translator K245AA at 96.9 MHz.

== History ==
KWIL 1240 AM had signed on the air in 1941. It decided to add an FM station to simulcast its programming. The first KWIL-FM began broadcasting on October 15, 1947, on 101.7 MHz. But few people owned FM receivers in that era and management saw little opportunity to make the station profitable. It was deleted from FCC records on August 21, 1956.

In the late 1960s, KWIL, now at 790 AM, decided to try adding an FM station again. The new KWIL-FM began broadcasting at 107.9 MHz, on January 12, 1969. KWIL had been a long-time religious broadcaster and KWIL-FM used the same format, although with a different programming schedule.

Previous logo

In 1972, the station took on a different call sign, KHPE. Over time, the Christian talk and teaching programs were reduced, replaced by Christian Contemporary music, more suitable for FM listeners. The station was known as "K-Happy" for many years, before rebranding as "Hope 107.9" in the early 2000's. The station sells advertising time but also accepts donations from listeners on its website.

== Translators ==
KHPE is simulcast on the following translator:

Call sign	Frequency	City of license	FID	ERP (W)	Class	FCC info
K245AA	96.9 FM	Eugene, Oregon	839	250	D	LMS
