= KWIL =

- Albany, Oregon; United States
- Broadcast area: Willamette Valley
- Frequency: 790 kHz
- Branding: KWIL For Christ

Programming
- Format: Christian radio

Ownership
- Owner: Extra Mile Media, Inc.
- Sister stations: KHPE

History
- First air date: January 14, 1941
- Former frequencies: 1240 kHz (1941–1953)
- Call sign meaning: Willamette Valley

Technical information
- Licensing authority: FCC
- Facility ID: 837
- Class: B
- Power: 1,000 watts
- Transmitter coordinates: 44°37′54″N 123°00′57″W
- Translator: 96.9 K245DI (Albany)

Links
- Public license information: Public file; LMS
- Webcast: Listen live
- Website: kwilforchrist.com

KWIL (790 AM, "KWIL For Christ") is a commercial radio station licensed to Albany, Oregon, United States, and serving the Willamette Valley with a Christian format. Owned by Extra Mile Media, Inc., studios and transmitter are located on Santiam Highway SE (U.S. Route 20).

Programming is also heard over low-power FM translator K245DI at 96.9 MHz in Albany.

== History ==
KWIL signed on the air on January 14, 1941. It originally was powered at 250 watts, broadcasting on a frequency of 1240 kHz. The station was owned and operated by the Central Willamette Broadcasting Company. KWIL was a network affiliate of the Mutual Broadcasting System.

On October 15, 1947, KWIL added an FM sister station, KWIL-FM at 101.7 MHz. Management saw little chance of making the station profitable and it was taken off the air on August 21, 1956.

In 1953, KWIL changed frequencies to 790 kHz. The lower dial position allowed its signal to expand; it increased its power to 1,000 watts but also had to use a directional antenna with different daytime and nighttime coverage patterns.

KWIL was acquired by Larry Gordon's Albany Radio Corporation on July 1, 1957. KWIL added a new FM station to its facilities. The second KWIL-FM began broadcasting at 107.9 MHz in 1969. Today, that station is co-owned KHPE, with a Christian Contemporary format.

Christian broadcaster Integrity Media acquired KWIL and KHPE in 1980. Integrity Media changed its name to Extra Mile Media, Inc., in 2005.

== Previous logo ==
(KWIL's logo under previous "The Word" branding)
