= KCUP =

- Toledo, Oregon; United States
- Frequency: 1230 kHz
- Branding: 1230 ESPN Radio

Programming
- Format: Sports
- Affiliations: ESPN Radio; Fox News Radio; Genesis Communications Network; Premiere Networks; Salem Radio Network

Ownership
- Owner: Jacobs Radio Programming, LLC

History
- First air date: September 26, 1960
- Former call signs: KTDO (1960–1992); KZUS (1992–1997); KPPT (1997–2005)

Technical information
- Licensing authority: FCC
- Facility ID: 645
- Class: C
- Power: 1,000 watts
- Transmitter coordinates: 44°37′47″N 123°56′35″W

Links
- Public license information: Public file; LMS

KCUP (1230 AM) is a radio station broadcasting a sports radio format. Licensed to Toledo, Oregon, United States, the station is currently licensed to Jacobs Radio Programming, LLC.

== History ==
The station began broadcasting as KTDO on September 26, 1960. It was owned by Edward C. McElroy Jr. until he sold it in 1969 to Charles A. Farmer. It was a country music station from at least 1973 until about 1999. In the 1980s, Farmer constructed its FM sister station, KCEL (later changing its callsign to KTDO-FM) which simulcast the AM programming for a number of years.

Farmer sold KTDO to Andrew and Cheryl Harle of Pendleton in 1990. On February 10, 1992, the station changed its call sign to KZUS. During this time, in 1994 station night DJ Richard E. Vanderhoof was found dead in the studio the next morning; an autopsy determined he died of natural causes. On October 10, 1997, the station changed its call sign to KPPT, and on February 9, 2005, to the current KCUP.

On June 18, 2017, KCUP changed its format from news/talk to regional Mexican, branded as "La Gran D 1230 AM".

In 2019, KCUP changed its format from regional Mexican back to news/talk. Rubin Broadcasting acquired the station in 2020.

On August 2, 2023, KCUP changed to a sports format using ESPN Radio following its acquisition by Jacobs Radio Programming, LLC. Jacobs purchased the station from Rubin Broadcasting for $18,500. The station carries mostly ESPN Radio with some local sports coverage.
