= KOAC-FM =

- Astoria, Oregon; United States
- Frequency: 89.7 MHz

Programming
- Format: Public radio
- Affiliations: NPR

Ownership
- Owner: Oregon Public Broadcasting

History
- First air date: 2001 (as KZNX)
- Former call signs: KZNX (1997–2003); KWYA (2003–2010)
- Call sign meaning: taken from KOAC (AM), originally owned by Oregon Agricultural College

Technical information
- Licensing authority: FCC
- Facility ID: 81807
- Class: A
- ERP: 185 watts
- HAAT: 320 meters (1,050 ft)
- Transmitter coordinates: 46°15′44.7″N 123°53′12.8″W

Links
- Public license information: Public file; LMS
- Webcast: Listen live
- Website: opb.org

KOAC-FM (89.7 FM) is a radio station licensed to Astoria, Oregon, United States. The station is owned by Oregon Public Broadcasting, and airs OPB's news and talk programming, consisting of syndicated programming from NPR, American Public Media and Public Radio Exchange, as well as locally produced offerings.
