= KOPB (AM) =

- Eugene, Oregon; United States
- Broadcast area: Eugene-Springfield
- Frequency: 1600 kHz

Programming
- Format: Public Radio and talk
- Affiliations: NPR; APM; PRX; BBC World Service

Ownership
- Owner: Oregon Public Broadcasting

History
- First air date: September 19, 1947
- Former call signs: KASH (1947–1985); KEED (1985–2005); KOPT (2005–2008)
- Call sign meaning: Oregon Public Broadcasting

Technical information
- Licensing authority: FCC
- Facility ID: 841
- Class: B
- Power: 5,000 watts (day); 1,000 watts (night)
- Transmitter coordinates: 44°03′4.4″N 123°03′52.3″W

Links
- Public license information: Public file; LMS
- Webcast: Listen live
- Website: opb.org

KOPB (1600 AM) is non-commercial radio station licensed to Eugene, Oregon, United States, and serving the Eugene-Springfield area. The station is owned by Oregon Public Broadcasting and it airs a public radio format with news and talk programming. KOPB carries programs primarily from NPR and other public radio networks. The station was assigned the KOPB call letters by the Federal Communications Commission on February 20, 2008.

The transmitter is on Day Island in Eugene, along the Willamette River.

== History ==
The station signed on the air on September 19, 1947. Its original call sign was KASH. The station was a network affiliate of CBS Radio. For a time in the mid-1970s, it aired an all news radio format, using the NBC News and Information Service (NIS). In 1985, it switched its call letters to KEED.

In the early 2000s, the station's call letters were KOPT. It aired Air America Radio programming, primarily progressive talk shows. On November 28, 2007, Oregon Public Broadcasting announced it had reached an agreement to purchase the station from Churchill Media for $500,000. On February 20, 2008, the station switched from Air America Radio to OPB public radio news-talk programming.

Although sister station KOAC 550 AM in Corvallis easily covers much of Eugene with OPB programming, some areas south of downtown Eugene do not get a strong signal. KOPB serves to fill in those areas. Listeners in the Eugene-Springfield area also have a local NPR member station in KLCC 89.7 FM, owned by Lane Community College.
