= KSJJ =

Radio station in Redmond–Bend, Oregon

Coordinates: 44.047°N 121.532°W

- Redmond, Oregon; United States
- Broadcast area: Bend, Oregon
- Frequency: 102.9 MHz
- Branding: KSJJ 102.9

Programming
- Format: Country
- Affiliations: Premiere Networks

Ownership
- Owner: Gross Communications
- Sister stations: KXIX, KMGX, KRXF

History
- First air date: February 4, 1981 (as KPRB-FM)
- Former call signs: KZKD (6/1982-8/1982); KPRB-FM (1982–1989)

Technical information
- Licensing authority: FCC
- Facility ID: 63433
- Class: C1
- ERP: 100,000 watts
- HAAT: 270 meters

Links
- Public license information: Public file; LMS
- Webcast: Listen Live
- Website: ksjj1029.com

KSJJ (102.9 FM) is a commercial country music radio station in Redmond, Oregon, broadcasting to the Bend, Oregon, area.

Syndicated programming includes After Midnite with Blair Garner hosted by Blair Garner from Premiere Radio Networks.
