= KSHO =

- Lebanon, Oregon; United States
- Broadcast area: Mid–Willamette Valley
- Frequency: 920 kHz
- Branding: KSHO 94.1 FM-920 AM

Programming
- Format: Soft oldies and adult standards
- Affiliations: Westwood One; ("America's Best Music")

Ownership
- Owner: Eads Broadcasting Corporation
- Sister stations: KGAL

History
- First air date: 1951
- Former call signs: KGAL (1951–1991)
- Former frequencies: 930 kHz (1951–1954)

Technical information
- Licensing authority: FCC
- Facility ID: 18038
- Class: B
- Power: 1,000 watts (unlimited)
- Transmitter coordinates: 44°34′30″N 122°55′15″W
- Translator: 94.1 K231CY (Lebanon)

Links
- Public license information: Public file; LMS
- Webcast: Listen live
- Website: ksho.net

KSHO (920 AM, "KSHO 94.1 FM and 920 AM") is a commercial radio station licensed to Lebanon, Oregon, United States, and serving the Mid–Willamette Valley. Owned by the Eads Broadcasting Corporation, It airs a soft oldies and adult standards format and is part of the "America's Best Music" network from Westwood One. KSHO is also heard on 250-watt FM translator K231CY at 94.1 MHz in Lebanon.

== History ==
=== KGAL ===
The station signed on the air in 1951. It broadcast with 1,000 watts of power on 930 kHz. The original call sign was KGAL under the ownership of W. Gordon Allen's Linn County Broadcasting Company. Part of the Allen Stations Group, KGAL shifted frequencies to the current 920 kHz in 1954.

On July 1, 1961, Allen sold KGAL to the Stadler Stations Group through its Radio Wonderland Willamette, Inc., subsidiary. Stadler held onto the station through the end of the 1960s.

The fact that the station had a low dial position it was able to get a lot out of 1000 watts of power. It had to protect other stations on 920 in Spokane and Olympia. The signal allowed it to cover the tri-cities of Albany, Lebanon, and Corvallis. The station called itself "K-Gal" and played a country music format. The studios were known as the "K-Gal Rancho" along Highway 20 on the outskirts of Lebanon, a familiar local landmark.

=== The 1970s ===
KGAL was purchased by Lebanon Broadcasting, Inc., in 1970. This station was co-owned with The Bend Bulletin newspaper. The station switched to Top 40 hits with Carl Reynolds as general manager. Under his leadership the station vaulted past KRKT in Albany.

92-KGAL peaked in 1972 using the moniker "The Rock of The Valley." Veteran programmer Jim Edwards (Dick Poirier) put together a strong air staff. The "White Rabbit" Jerry Vance did the morning show. In middays there was Eddie Beacon, who later became a popular DJ in Knoxville, Tennessee. He was replaced by Ernie Hopsecker using the name John W. Roberts. Edwards handled PM drive until his departure when Dusty Brooks, whom Edwards had hired in Providence, took that shift. His air name was Todd Martin. From there Brooks went on to Chicago's WGLD-FM where he was Music Director and handled the 6-10 PM shift. The station's news director was Jim Brinson who later became a popular TV sportscaster in Pittsburgh and a member of the Pittsburgh Pirates broadcast team. Another popular DJ was J. Parker Antrim from Missoula, Montana, who took over the morning show when Vance departed. From KGAL he took his talents to Columbus, Ohio, and then to San Francisco where he worked at some prestigious stations including legendary KYA.

In late 1972, Sam Lee stepped in as Program Director and worked on the air as "Super Shannon." During his tenure, Western Communications acquired KGAL from Lebanon Broadcasting, Inc., in 1973. The new owners maintained the Top 40 music format but the ownership change proved short-lived. Soon after Lee left, KGAL was acquired by Juniper Broadcasting in November 1974. In March 1979, Juniper Broadcasting changed its name to Capps Broadcasting Group, Inc. The Top 40 format was maintained through the sale in 1981.

=== Eads Broadcasting ===
In July 1981, Capps Broadcasting Group, Inc., reached an agreement to sell this station to the Eads Broadcasting Corporation. The deal was approved by the FCC on September 17, 1981. The station was assigned the KSHO call letters by the Federal Communications Commission on November 1, 1991.

In addition to its music programming, throughout 2009, KSHO and sister station KGAL aired a series of one-minute historical vignettes as part of Oregon's sesquicentennial celebration. The program, titled A Moment in Oregon History, highlighted key events in Oregon history and notable Oregon residents. Each of the 240 vignettes was written by author Rick Steber.
