= KEQB =

Radio station in Coburg–Eugene, Oregon

- Coburg, Oregon; United States
- Broadcast area: Eugene, Oregon
- Frequency: 97.7 MHz
- Branding: La Que Buena 97.7

Programming
- Format: Regional Mexican
- Affiliations: Uforia Audio Network

Ownership
- Owner: John and Renate Tilson; (McKenzie River Broadcasting Company, Inc.)

History
- First air date: 1992 (as KSHL at 97.5)
- Former call signs: Gleneden Beach: KSHL (1991–2016)
- Former frequencies: Gleneden Beach: 97.5 MHz (1992–2016)

Technical information
- Licensing authority: FCC
- Facility ID: 63205
- Class: C3
- ERP: 2,900 watts
- HAAT: 298 meters (978 ft)
- Transmitter coordinates: 44°00′04″N 123°06′45″W

Links
- Public license information: Public file; LMS
- Webcast: Listen Live
- Website: keqb.fm

KEQB (97.7 FM) is an American radio station licensed to serve Coburg, Oregon, United States. The station, which began broadcasting in 1992, is owned by John and Renate Tilson, through licensee McKenzie River Broadcasting Company, Inc.

== Programming ==
KEQB broadcasts a regional Mexican format to Coburg, Oregon, and the Eugene-Springfield area. Since it Has an affiliation deal with Uforia Audio Network, the on air staff is : 6AM-10AM: El Bueno, La Mala Y El Feo 10AM-3PM: Lupita 3PM-7PM: El Free-Guey Show 7PM-9PM: Las Repegadas 9PM-12AM: Puras Buenas.

== History ==
This station received its original construction permit from the Federal Communications Commission on April 18, 1991. The new station was assigned the KSHL call sign by the FCC on May 31, 1991. KSHL received its license to cover from the FCC on March 2, 1993. On Sept. 15, 2015, an Application was filed with the FCC to assign the station license to McKenzie River Broadcasting Company, Inc. The assignment to McKenzie River Broadcasting was consummated on January 6, 2016, at a purchase price of $650,000.

On February 2, 2016, the station changed its call sign from KSHL to KEQB. On February 18, 2016 KEQB began transmitting from its new Coburg facilities (serving the Eugene area) at 97.7 FM with a regional Mexican format, branded as "La Que Buena 97.7".

== Construction permit ==
In March 2008, KSHL applied to the FCC for a construction permit that would allow it to become a Class C3 station, raise its antenna to 300 meters (980 ft) in height above average terrain, decrease its effective radiated power to 2,800 watts, change its broadcast frequency from 97.5 to 97.7 MHz, relocate its transmitter site southeast to 44°00'08"N, 123°06'50"W, and change its community of license to Coburg, Oregon. This move would allow the station to serve the larger Eugene, Oregon, market, and at the same time allowing KNRQ (at 97.9) to relocate to the Portland area. The FCC accepted this application for filing on April 14, 2008, but it took until March 10, 2016 for the license to be issued.
