= KRXF =

Radio station in Bend, Oregon

Coordinates: 44.047°N 121.532°W

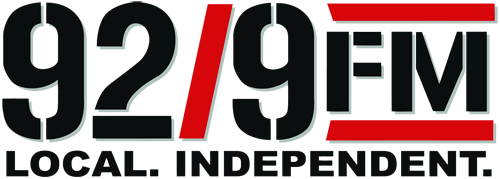
- Bend, Oregon; United States
- Broadcast area: Bend, Oregon
- Frequency: 92.9 MHz
- Branding: 92/9 FM

Programming
- Format: Alternative rock

Ownership
- Owner: GCC BEND, LLC
- Sister stations: KXIX, KMGX, KSJJ

History
- First air date: December 1974 (as KXIQ at 94.1)
- Former call signs: KXIQ (1974–1995); KXIX (1995–2010)
- Former frequencies: 94.1 MHz (1974–2010)

Technical information
- Licensing authority: FCC
- Facility ID: 49913
- Class: C0
- ERP: 100,000 watts
- HAAT: 303 meters

Links
- Public license information: Public file; LMS
- Webcast: Listen Live
- Website: 929online.com

KRXF (92.9 FM) is a commercial alternative rock music radio station in Bend, Oregon, broadcasting to the Bend, Oregon, area.

The station is referred to as "92/9".

On Sunday July 11, 2010 KRXF moved from 92.7 FM to 92.9 FM.

== History ==
As KXIQ at 94.1, in the 1980s and early 1990s, the station was branded as “Q94” with a Top 40 format. KXIQ switched to rock for less than two years, before becoming hot adult contemporary “Mix 94” KXIX in 1994. The format changed again in 1996, to alternative rock “X94” which later evolved back to rock. In July 2002, KXIX returned to Top 40 as “Power 94” and has remained one of the most listened-to stations in Central Oregon.

In July 2010, 94.1 KXIX Bend swapped facilities with 92.7 KRXF Sunriver, as “Power 94” became a C2 at 94.1, while “92/7” became a C0 as "92/9".
