= KSLM (AM) =

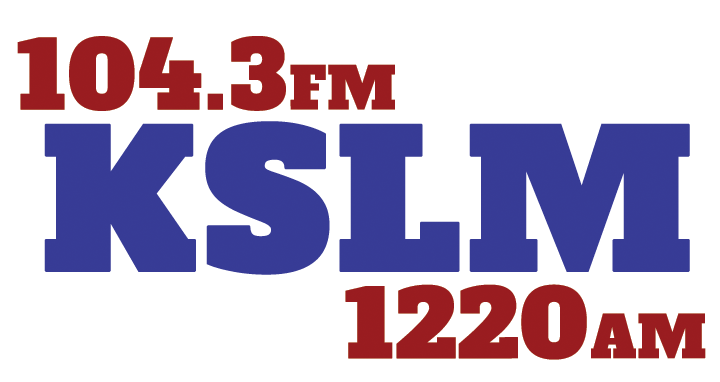
- Salem, Oregon; United States
- Frequency: 1220 kHz
- Branding: 104.3 FM & 1220 AM

Programming
- Format: Conservative talk
- Affiliations: Fox News Radio; Genesis Communications Network; Premiere Networks; Salem Radio Network; Westwood One

Ownership
- Owner: Jacqueline Smith; (KCCS, LLC)

History
- First air date: December 12, 1961 (as KAPT)
- Former call signs: KAPT (1961–1972); KCCS (1972–2006); KBDY (2006–2007); KPJC (2007–2018)
- Call sign meaning: Salem

Technical information
- Licensing authority: FCC
- Facility ID: 10963
- Class: D
- Power: 1,000 watts day; 171 watts night
- Transmitter coordinates: 44°57′4.43″N 122°58′14.34″W
- Translator: 104.3 K282BY (Salem)

Links
- Public license information: Public file; LMS
- Webcast: Listen live
- Website: kslm.news

KSLM (1220 kHz) is an AM radio station licensed to serve Salem, Oregon, United States. The station is owned by Jacqueline Smith and the broadcast license is held by KCCS, LLC.

== Current programming ==
KSLM broadcasts a conservative talk radio format.

== History ==
Salem Broadcasters was issued a construction permit by the Federal Communications Commission in 1960 to construct a new AM station broadcasting with 1,000 watts of power on a frequency of 1220 kHz. On December 12, 1961, KAPT began regular broadcast operations under the leadership of general manager Col. Carl W. Nelson.

Less than a decade later, in October 1971, control of KAPT passed to the local 1st Assembly of God. They shifted the programming to Christian music and had the call sign legally changed to KCCS. In 1973, the name of the license holding company was changed to Christian Center Church . The name on the license was changed again in 1974, this time settling on Christian Center of Salem.

The FCC gave the station authorization to add nighttime service at 171 watts of power which covered the city of peace well, in spring of 1986.

After more than three decades of continuous ownership, the Christian Center of Salem reached an agreement in February 2004 to sell KCCS to Christian media magnate Cindy Smith-Wyant DBA The JC Media Group through its KCCS, LLC, holding company. The deal was approved by the FCC on April 15, 2004, and the transaction was consummated on May 6, 2004.

As part of a rebranding effort, the station applied for a new call sign and was assigned KBDY by the FCC on December 6, 2006. The station was assigned the KPJC call sign by the FCC on February 18, 2007.

On March 5, 2018, KPJC changed its call sign to KSLM. On the weekend of April 1, 2018, an FM translator was added to KSLM's AM 1220 frequency broadcasting from Bald Mountain in West Salem simulcasting the station. After almost a decade of investment through sweat equity, in February 2022, Cindy Wyant released ownership of KSLM to Jacqueline Smith.

== Translator ==
Call sign	Frequency	City of license	FID	ERP (W)	Class	Transmitter coordinates	FCC info
K282BY	104.3 FM	Salem, Oregon	201439	180	D	44°59′49.4″N 123°9′16.4″W	LMS
