= KRBM (FM) =

OPB radio station in Pendleton, Oregon

- Pendleton, Oregon; United States
- Frequency: 90.9 MHz

Programming
- Format: Public radio and talk
- Affiliations: NPR; APM; PRX

Ownership
- Owner: Oregon Public Broadcasting

History
- First air date: April 18, 1970
- Call sign meaning: "Radio Blue Mountain"

Technical information
- Licensing authority: FCC
- Facility ID: 50608
- Class: C2
- ERP: 25,000 watts
- HAAT: 180 meters (590 ft)
- Transmitter coordinates: 45°35′21″N 118°59′53″W

Links
- Public license information: Public file; LMS
- Webcast: Listen live
- Website: opb.org

KRBM (90.9 FM) is a radio station licensed to Pendleton, Oregon. The station is owned by Oregon Public Broadcasting, and airs OPB's news and talk programming, consisting of syndicated programming from NPR, APM and PRX, as well as locally produced offerings.

== History ==
KRBM's roots began when Blaine Hanks was recruited by Blue Mountain Community College in 1968 to start a 2-year radio broadcasting program. On April 18, 1970, KRBM signed on the air with broadcast students operating the station and Blaine Hanks as general manager. The calls letters stood for Radio Blue Mountain. The original power was 10 watts and was mono. The station only operated during the school year. Over the years, power was increased and by 1984 had a mono signal of 440 watts effected radiated power. The broadcast antenna was located above the station on Morrow Hall. It still only broadcast during the school year, Monday through Saturday from 12:00 p.m. to midnight with a top 40 format.

In 1981, the station developed a partnership with Oregon Public Broadcasting and began broadcasting OPB Monday through Friday from 10:00 a.m. to 12:00 p.m., with the student-run top 40 programming continuing to air until midnight. In 1984, OPB invested in the radio station with a new control board and transmitter exciter converting the station from a mono to stereo signal. In June 1987 OPB moved the KRBM transmitter from Blue Mountain Community College to Warren Hill and increased power to 25 kW, covering a large portion of Eastern Oregon. OPB programs also took over most of the schedule, leaving only Friday and Saturday evenings for local broadcasting for the students. The power increase led to a merger with OPB. By 1988, OPB assumed all of the programming and Blue Mountain Community College ended the broadcasting program. Blaine Hanks remained the general manager through the entire history at BMCC. The studios were eventually removed from the college, and OPB partnered with KUMA to maintain the operations in Pendleton.
