= Oregon Public Broadcasting =

PBS and NPR member networks in Oregon

- Type: Non-commercial educational broadcast television and radio network
- Branding: OPB
- Country: United States
- First air date: Radio: January 23, 1923; Television: October 7, 1957
- Broadcast area: Statewide Oregon; (except the Medford–Klamath Falls market; additional coverage in southern Washington)
- Owner: Oregon Public Broadcasting
- Digital channel: see § Television stations
- Affiliations: Radio: NPR; APM; PRX; BBCWS; Television: PBS; APT
- Former affiliations: NET (1957–1970)
- Official website: www.opb.org

Oregon Public Broadcasting (OPB) is the primary public media organization for most of the U.S. state of Oregon, as well as southern Washington. It provides news, information, and programming via television stations, dozens of VHF or UHF translators, on more than 20 radio stations, and via opb.org and other digital platforms. TV broadcasts include local and regional programming as well as programs from the Public Broadcasting Service (PBS) and American Public Television (APT), and radio programs from National Public Radio (NPR), American Public Media (APM), Public Radio Exchange (PRX), and the BBC World Service, among other distributors. Its headquarters and television studios are located on South Macadam Avenue in Portland, Oregon.

The part of southwestern Oregon not served by OPB, including Medford and Klamath Falls, is served by Jefferson Public Radio, and Southern Oregon PBS.

== History ==
=== 20th century ===
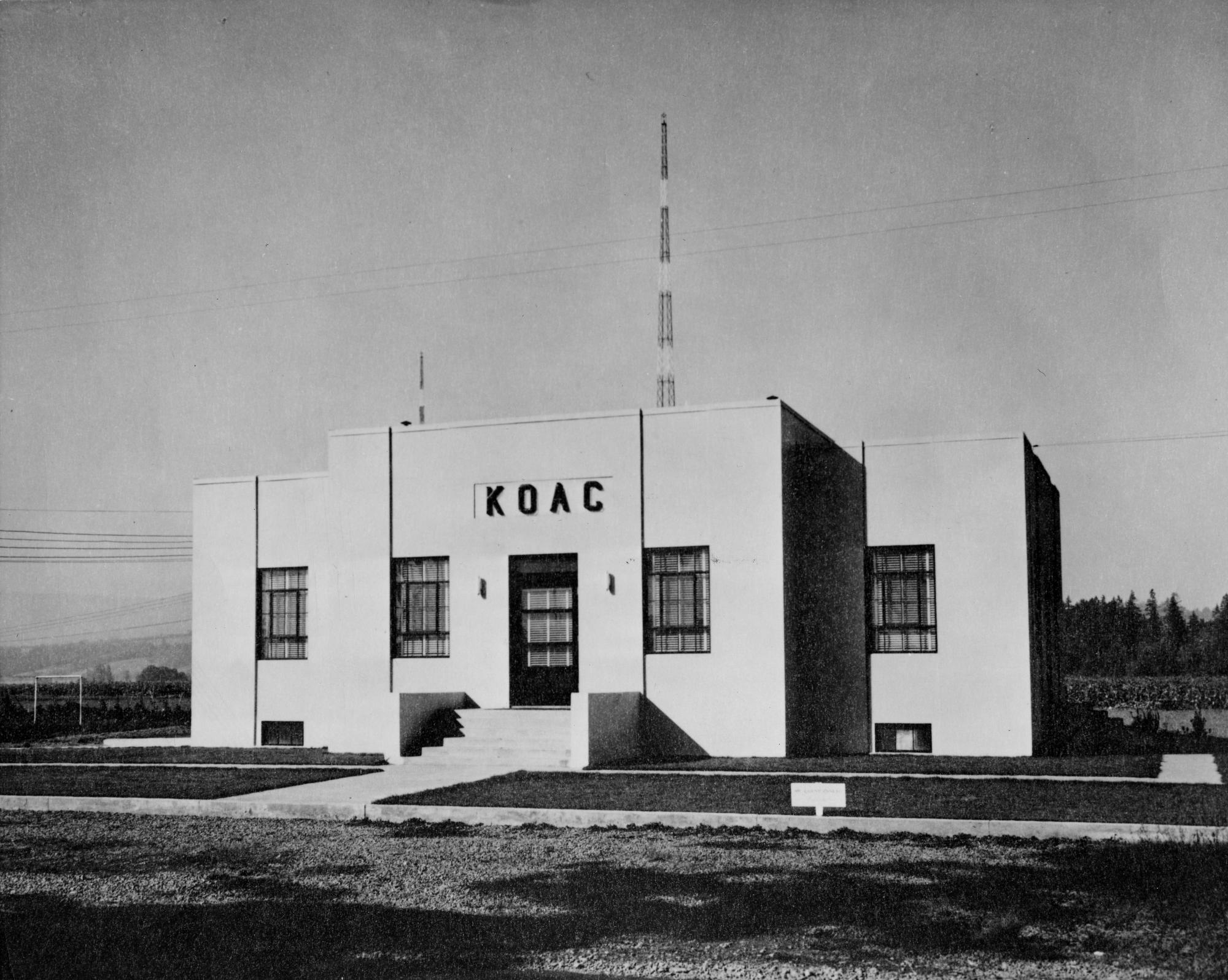
KOAC early studio and transmitter building near Oregon State University, c. 1941

OPB traces its roots back to January 23, 1923, when KFDJ signed on from the campus of Oregon Agricultural College (now Oregon State University) in Corvallis. From 1923 to 1981, the OAC/Oregon State campus served as the base of operations for educational broadcasting in Oregon. Charles B. Mitchel, a first-year speech professor at OAC, was instrumental in bringing Oregon's first public radio station to the state. physics instructor Jacob Jordan is credited with building the station's first radio transmitter near campus in 1923. It was one of several AM stations signed on by land-grant colleges in the early days of radio.

The radio station's call letters were changed to KOAC on December 11, 1925. In 1932, KOAC became a service of the Oregon State Board of Higher Education General Extension Division.

During the mid-1950s, the university constructed KOAC's first television studios inside Gill Coliseum. On October 7, 1957, KOAC-TV signed on as Oregon's first educational television station. For nearly 60 years, faculty and students at Oregon State University broadcast news, information and entertainment programming across the state from the Corvallis studios. First known as Oregon Educational Broadcasting, the public network became the Oregon Educational and Public Broadcasting Service (OEPBS) in 1971.

KOAC won its first Peabody Award for Outstanding Public Service by a Local Station in 1942 for Our Hidden Enemy, Venereal Disease. KOAC won a second Peabody Award in 1972 for Conversations with Will Shakespeare and Certain of His Friends.

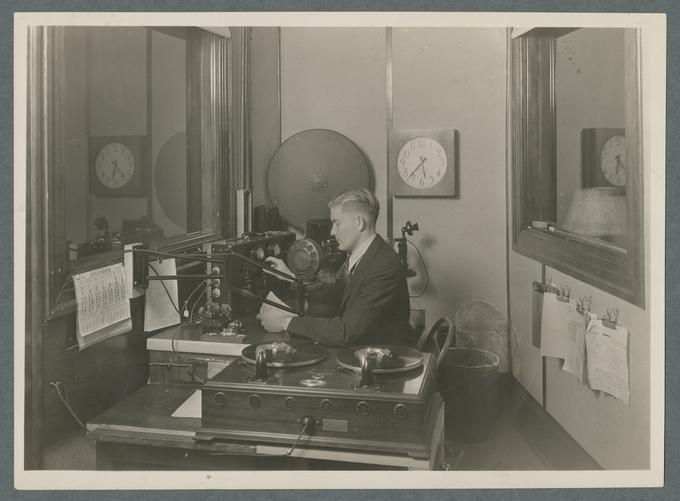
KOAC-AM announcer broadcasting from the main studios in Covell Hall at Oregon State University (1929).

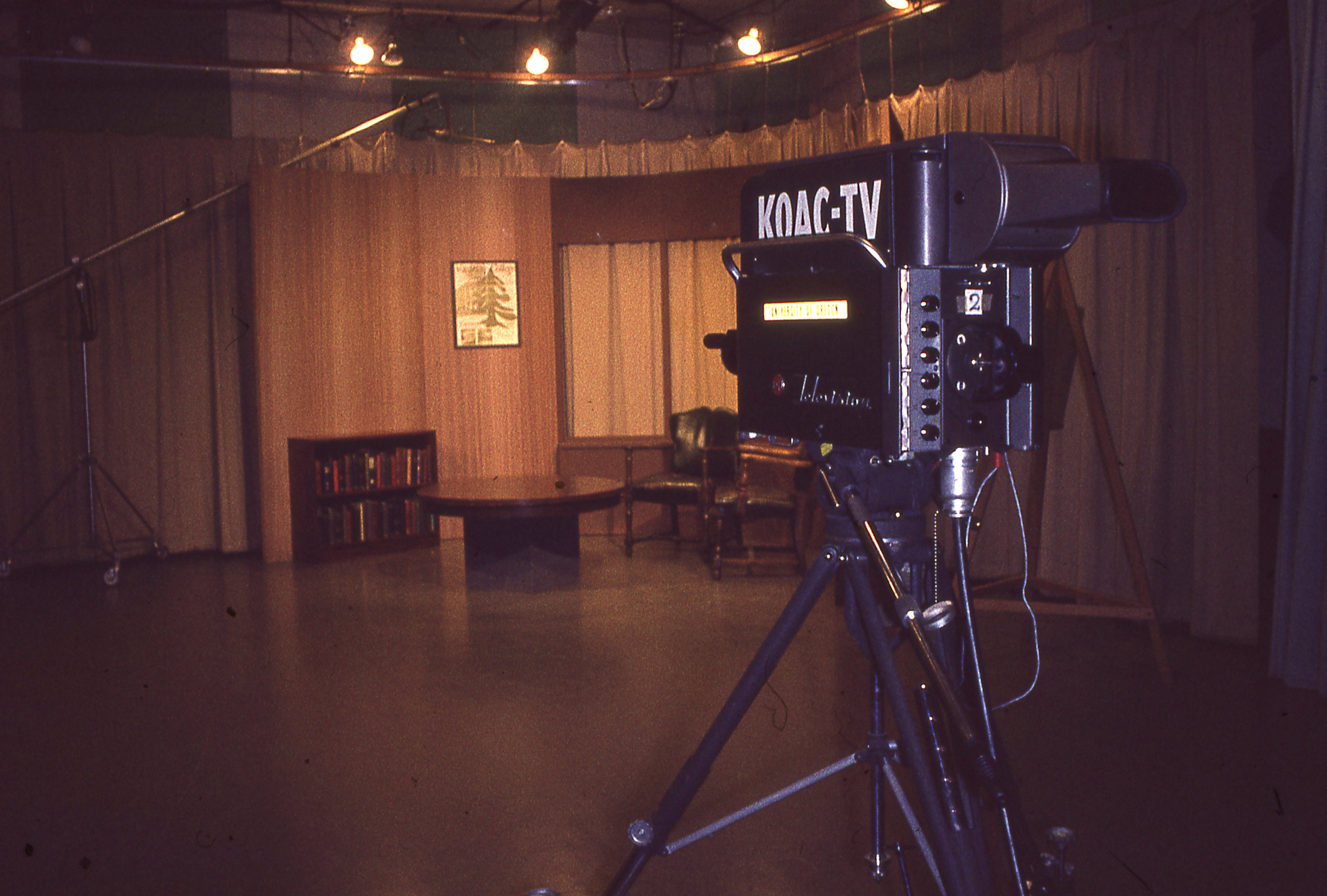
KOAC-TV satellite studio at University of Oregon (Eugene), 1963

In the late 1950s, KOAC's broadcast signal was shared across the state by microwave transmitters and receivers. KOAC also added satellite studios for radio broadcasting in Eugene, Monmouth, Salem, and Portland. In the 1960s, satellite TV studios were added in Portland and Eugene. The Portland studio was located in a leased building at what is now 2828 SW Naito Parkway. A full-time satellite of KOAC-TV began broadcasting on February 6, 1961 as KOAP-TV (for KOAC Portland); KOAP-FM followed in 1962. The Eugene studio was located on the University of Oregon campus, in Villard Hall. Up until 1965, all programs from the KOAC satellites were live, due to a lack of video recording equipment. Both studios operated two RCA TK31 cameras for live broadcasts.

On December 6, 1964, KTVR-TV began broadcasting in La Grande. The station started primarily as a commercial television station, affiliated with NBC and ABC. KTVR-TV operated as a semi-satellite of KTVB in Boise, Idaho. The La Grande studio was located at 1605 Adams Ave. and produced nightly newscasts and other local programming. However, by 1967, the La Grande studio and office were closed and KTVR became a full-fledged satellite of KTVB. KTVR was unique in the Pacific Time Zone, because as a repeater of a Mountain Time Zone station, its "prime time" schedule was broadcast from 6 to 9 p.m. OEPBS bought KTVR on August 31, 1976, and converted it to PBS on February 1, 1977. At first, KTVR rebroadcast programming from two Washington stations—KWSU-TV in Pullman and KSPS-TV in Spokane—until OEPBS completed a transmission link to La Grande. On September 1, 1977, OEPBS took KTVR off the air for transmitter repairs, due to increasing technical problems. KTVR returned to the air on January 1, 1978, carrying OEPBS programming for the first time.

KOAB-TV in Bend began broadcasting on February 24, 1970, as KVDO-TV, a commercial independent station licensed to Salem. Channel 3 struggled to compete with Portland's established independent, KPTV (channel 12), and in 1972, the station was purchased by Liberty Communications, then-owners of Eugene's ABC affiliate KEZI (channel 9). The intention was to make KVDO a full-power satellite of KEZI. During the sale, KATU (channel 2), Portland's ABC affiliate, objected over duplication of programming, and there were also objections to Liberty's common ownership of local cable systems and the television station. As a result, the Federal Communications Commission (FCC) allowed Liberty to buy KVDO-TV on the condition that it sell the station within three years.

The state government approved the purchase of KVDO-TV in 1975, with OEPBS taking control of the station on February 19, 1976. Nine days later, on February 28, a disgruntled viewer protesting KVDO's sale to OEPBS cut guy wires, toppling the channel 3 transmitter tower. On September 20, 1976, KVDO signed back on the air with a new tower; from then until March 31, 1981, the station broadcast an alternate program lineup to KOAP-TV and KOAC-TV, featuring time-shifted OEPBS programs, shows for the Spanish-speaking population in the Willamette Valley, and several local productions in Salem. OEPBS consistently eyed moving the station elsewhere to reduce duplication, which became more acute when budget cuts prompted KVDO-TV to drop its separate programs in 1981. The network pursued and won approval from the FCC to move the channel 3 allocation and license to Bend, which had no PBS coverage. KVDO-TV ceased broadcasting in Salem on July 31, 1983; on December 22, channel 3 signed back on the air as KOAB. The call letters were modified to KOAB-TV when KOAB-FM signed on the air on January 23, 1986.

In 1981, OEPBS was spun off from the Oregon State System of Higher Education and became a separate state agency, Oregon Public Broadcasting. As part of the network overhaul, KOAP-FM-TV became the flagships of the OPB network and central operations were relocated from Corvallis to Portland. The Portland stations changed their calls to KOPB-FM-TV in 1989.

KEPB-TV in Eugene began operation on February 27, 1990, as Eugene's first public television station, bringing most of Eugene a clear signal for PBS programming for the first time ever. Although KOAC-TV had long claimed Eugene as part of its primary coverage area (Corvallis is part of the Eugene market), it only provided rimshot coverage to most of Eugene itself and was marginal at best in the southern portion of the city. Most of Eugene could only get a clear picture from KOAC-TV on cable.

In the early 2000s, OPB installed Oregon's first digital transmitter, taking a critical first step in the digital television transition.

=== 21st century ===
For 2001 and 2002, the Oregon state government provided about 14 percent of OPB's operational budget; for 2003 and 2004, it was cut to 9 percent.

On December 4, 2007, OPB launched opbmusic, a 24-hour online radio channel spotlighting Pacific Northwest musicians. As of December 11, 2020, OPB discontinued the opbmusic HD radio and online audio stream and integrated opbmusic multimedia content into its broader arts and culture reporting.

In March 2009, the Corporation for Public Broadcasting chose OPB to manage the pilot version of American Archive, CPB's initiative to digitally preserve content created by public broadcasters.

In 2024, OPB released a documentary titled Road to Sunrise: A Journey to Reconcile Oregon's Racist History, which focused on work done surrounding the remembrance of Alonzo Tucker by the Oregon Remembrance Project. The documentary won a NATAS Northwest Emmy under the category of "Historical/Cultural – Long Form Content".

== Television stations ==
Station	City of license	Channels (RF / VC)	First air date	Call letters' meaning	ERP	HAAT	Facility ID	Transmitter coordinates	Public license information
KOPB-TV (Note: KOPB-TV used the callsign KOAP-TV from its 1961 sign-on until 1989.)	Portland	10 (VHF); 10	February 6, 1961 (65 years ago)	Oregon Public Broadcasting	46 kW	524 m (1,719 ft)	50589	45°31′20.5″N 122°44′49.5″W	Public file LMS
KOAC-TV	Corvallis	7 (VHF); 7	October 7, 1957 (68 years ago)	Oregon Agricultural College	18.1 kW	357 m (1,171 ft)	50590	44°38′24.9″N 123°16′29.3″W	Public file LMS
KEPB-TV (Note: KEPB-TV used the call sign KZJD during its construction permit from 1989 to 1990, and KEPB (without the -TV suffix) for just one day on May 1, 1990.)	Eugene	29 (UHF); 28	September 27, 1990 (35 years ago)	Eugene Public Broadcasting	100 kW	403 m (1,322 ft)	50591	44°0′9″N 123°6′58.5″W	Public file LMS
KOAB-TV (Note: KOAB-TV used the callsign KVDO-TV from its 1970 sign-on until 1983. It was a commercial independent station until OEPBS bought the station in 1976. It was licensed to Salem until 1983.)	Bend	11 (VHF); 3	February 24, 1970 (56 years ago)	KOAC Bend	90 kW	245 m (804 ft)	50588	44°4′39.9″N 121°20′0.3″W	Public file LMS
KTVR (Note: KTVR was a commercial station relaying KTVB from Boise, Idaho until 1977.)	La Grande	13 (VHF); 13	December 6, 1964 (61 years ago)	Television Grande Ronde	16.1 kW	775 m (2,543 ft)	50592	45°18′32.7″N 117°43′58.3″W	Public file LMS

== Cable and satellite availability ==
OPB Television is available on all cable providers in its service area. On Dish Network, KOPB-TV, KEPB-TV, and KOAB-TV are available on the Portland, Eugene and Bend local broadcast station lineups, respectively. KOPB-TV and KEPB-TV are available on the Portland and Eugene DirecTV broadcast station lineups.

== Digital television ==
OPB's first digital channel was OPB CREATE (an affiliate of the Create network), announced in January 2006; its availability was limited to certain Comcast digital cable customers and on Clear Creek Television in Oregon City.

In December 2008, in anticipation of the original February 18, 2009, deadline for switching to all-digital broadcasting, OPB announced the launch of three digital subchannels: OPB, which would air OPB programming with an "improved picture for viewers with traditional sets", OPB HD, airing programming in "high definition with the highest-quality picture and sound", and OPB Plus, which offered "more choices in viewing times and added programs in news, public affairs and lifestyle."

=== Subchannels ===
OPB currently offers four digital multiplex channels:

OPB multiplex
Subchannel	Res.	Short name	Programming
xx.1	1080i	OPB	PBS
xx.2	1080i	World	OPB World
xx.3	480i	OPBKids	OPB Kids
xx.4	480i	OPB-FM	OPB Radio; KMHD Jazz Radio (SAP channel 1)

OPB was one of the partners of The Oregon Channel, a public affairs network that began with the 74th Oregon Legislative Assembly in 2007. Programming consisted of Oregon legislative sessions and other public affairs events. The Oregon Channel was discontinued in 2011.

All of OPB's digital channels are also available on cable providers Comcast Xfinity, Charter Spectrum and Ziply Fiber (grandfathered TV subscribers), and three other providers serving specific regions and communities in Oregon: Clear Creek (a cooperative serving the Redland area of Oregon City), BendBroadband (serving Central Oregon), and Crestview Cable Communications (serving Madras, Prineville, and La Pine).

On July 6, 2011, OPB combined OPB and OPB SD into one high-definition channel feed on the main channel of its digital stations. OPB Plus moved from the third digital subchannel to the second subchannel and OPB Radio moved from the fourth digital subchannel to the third subchannel.

On January 26, 2023, OPB ended broadcasting of OPB Plus and replaced it with OPB World.

=== Analog-to-digital conversion ===
During 2009, OPB shut down the analog transmitters of the stations on a staggered basis. The station's digital channel allocations post-transition are as follows:

- KOAC-TV shut down its analog signal, over VHF channel 7; the station's digital signal relocated from its pre-transition UHF channel 39 to VHF channel 7.
- KOPB-TV shut down its analog, signal, over VHF channel 10; the station's digital signal relocated from its pre-transition UHF channel 27 to VHF channel 10.
- KEPB-TV shut down its analog signal, over UHF channel 28; the station's digital signal remained on its pre-transition UHF channel 29, using virtual channel 28.
- KOAB-TV shut down its analog signal, over VHF channel 3; the station's digital signal remained on its pre-transition VHF channel 11, using virtual channel 3.
- KTVR shut down its analog signal, over VHF channel 13; the station's digital signal relocated from its pre-transition VHF channel 5 to channel 13.

== Translators ==
- K17GK-D Arlington (translates KOPB-TV)
- K23GK-D Astoria (translates KOPB-TV)
- K20IV-D Baker City (translates KTVR)
- K36BA-D Burns (translates KOPB-TV)
- K26KQ-D Christmas Valley (translates KOPB-TV)
- K16IE-D Coos Bay (translates KOAC-TV)
- K23KD-D Coos Bay, etc. (translates KEPB-TV)
- K20IR-D Cottage Grove (translates KEPB-TV)
- K11VI-D Elkton (translates KOAC-TV)
- K28JC-D Enterprise (translates KTVR)
- K21FS-D Eugene (translates KEPB-TV)
- K32HF-D Florence (translates KEPB-TV)
- K24FH-D Glide, etc. (translates KEPB-TV)
- K29JN-D Gold Beach (translates KOPB-TV)
- K31IR-D Grays River, WA (translates KOPB-TV)
- K10NF-D Halfway (translates KTVR)
- K28GD-D Heppner, etc. (translates KOPB-TV)
- K36FG-D Hood River, etc. (translates KOPB-TV)
- K26FQ-D John Day (translates KOPB-TV)
- K34NG-D La Grande (translates KTVR)
- K19BK-D Lakeview (translates KOPB-TV)
- K33KD-D London Springs (translates KEPB-TV)
- KOAB-TV (DRT) 16 Madras (translates KOAC-TV)
- K34JR-D Madras (translates KOAC-TV)
- K19EC-D Mapleton (translates KEPB-TV)
- K30OA-D Milton-Freewater (translates KTVR)
- K33LZ-D Myrtle Point (translates KEPB-TV)
- KOPB-TV (DRT) 29 Newberg (translates KOPB-TV)
- K18FR-D Newport (translates KOAC-TV)
- K11SZ-D Oakridge (translates KEPB-TV)
- K30QD-D Ontario, etc. (translates KTVR)
- K19EI-D Pacific City/Cloverdale (translates KOAC-TV)
- K09VC-D Paisley (translates KOPB-TV)
- K28LO-D Paisley (translates KOPB-TV)
- K25OO-D Pendleton (translates KTVR)
- K16LI-D Port Orford (translates KEPB-TV)
- K26NJ-D Powers (translates KOAC-TV)
- K16EM-D Prineville, etc. (translates KOAB-TV)
- K28IH-D Rainier (translates KOPB-TV)
- K20LL-D Reedsport (translates KEPB-TV)
- K08KW-D Richland (translates KTVR)
- K36GU-D Rockway Beach (translates KOPB-TV)
- K15KN-D Roseburg (translates KEPB-TV)
- K34LS-D Seneca (translates KOPB-TV)
- KOPB-TV (DRT) 28 Sentinel Hill (translates KOPB-TV)
- K08LG-D Silver Lake, etc. (translates KOPB-TV)
- K31HZ-D The Dalles, etc. (translates KOPB-TV)
- KOAB-TV (DRT) 30 Warm Springs (translates KOAB-TV)
- K04MG-D Wedderburn, etc. (translates KOPB-TV)

Low-power translators in Elkton, Glendale, Mapleton, Myrtle Point, Newport, Oakland, Oakridge, and Swisshome have been discontinued.

== Radio stations ==
Call sign	Frequency	City of license	Facility ID	Class	Power (W)	ERP (W)	Height (m (ft))
KOAC-FM	89.7 FM	Astoria	81807	A	—	180	321 m (1,053 ft)
KOBK	88.9 FM	Baker City	94195	C3	—	600	559 m (1,834 ft)
KOAB-FM	91.3 FM	Bend	50609	C1	—	75,000	199 m (653 ft)
KOBN	90.1 FM	Burns	174446	A	—	600	274 m (899 ft)
KOAC	550 AM	Corvallis	50587	B	5,000	—	—
KOTD	89.7 FM	The Dalles	173179	A	—	50	589 m (1,932 ft)
KETP	88.7 FM	Enterprise	174467	A	—	100	535 m (1,755 ft)
KOPB	1600 AM	Eugene	841	B	5,000 day 1,000 night	—	—
KOGL	89.3 FM	Gleneden Beach	91095	A	—	210	−14 m (−46 ft)
KHRV	90.1 FM	Hood River	90769	A	—	65	227 m (745 ft)
KOJD	89.7 FM	John Day	174221	A	—	900	−39 m (−128 ft)
KTVR-FM	89.9 FM	La Grande	94194	C2	—	400	760 m (2,490 ft)
KOAP	88.7 FM	Lakeview	93285	A	—	170	−180 m (−590 ft)
KOPB-FM (Note: Flagship station)	91.5 FM	Portland	50607	C0	—	73,000	470 m (1,540 ft)
KRBM	90.9 FM	Pendleton	50608	C2	—	25,000	180 m (590 ft)
KTMK	91.1 FM	Tillamook	91082	A	—	140	356 m (1,168 ft)

Notes:

Broadcast translators of KOPB-FM
Call sign	Frequency	City of license	Facility ID	Class	ERP (W)	Height (m (ft))
K283BT	104.5 FM	Astoria	142734	D	70	107.4 m (352 ft)
K276BU	103.1 FM	Corvallis	50601	D	15	326 m (1,070 ft)
K214AQ	90.7 FM	Mount Vernon	50603	D	25	383 m (1,257 ft)
K293BL	106.5 FM	Nedonna Beach	50610	D	10	396.9 m (1,302 ft)
K298AC	107.5 FM	Ontario	50611	D	62	120 m (390 ft)
K228DT	93.5 FM	Pacific City	50614	D	10	677 m (2,221 ft)
K212AQ	90.3 FM	Riley	50598	D	50	524.7 m (1,721 ft)
K252DL	98.3 FM	Walton	92367	D	8	489.8 m (1,607 ft)

Since the spring of 2009, OPB has operated jazz radio station KMHD; the station is owned by Mount Hood Community College, but operates out of OPB's studio facilities in Portland.

=== HD stations ===
Currently only KMHD and KOPB-FM carry HD radio content.

The OPB HD radio channels are:

Channel	Programming
OPB FM HD-1	Main OPB radio programing
KMHD-FM HD-1	KMHD "Jazz Radio"

=== Other radio frequencies ===
- Halfway – 91.3 FM
- Happy Hollow, Oregon – 93.5 FM
- Nedonna Beach – 106.5 FM
- Richland – 91.9 FM
- Silver Lake (Lake County) – 91.7 FM
- Riley – 90.3 FM K212AQ (50 watts) FCC LMS
- Mount Vernon – 90.7 FM K214AQ (25 watts) FCC LMS
- Pacific City – 93.5 FM K228DT (10 watts) FCC LMS
- Walton – 98.3 FM K252DL (8 watts) FCC LMS
- Corvallis – 103.1 FM K276BU (15 watts) FCC LMS
- Astoria – 104.5 FM K283BT (70 watts) FCC LMS
- Nedonna Beach – 106.5 FM K293BL (10 watts) FCC LMS

== Original programming ==
OPB produces original audio and video content for distribution across multiple channels including TV, radio, and online podcasting or streaming services.

Notable podcast series include Bundyville, a deep-dive investigation of the beliefs and politics behind the 2014 Bundy standoff, the 2016 Occupation of the Malheur National Wildlife Refuge, and the sovereign citizen movement. Its second season aired in 2019 with a broadened focus on right-wing and anti-government extremism in the United States. Long-running programs include OPB Politics Now and Think Out Loud, both of which have been on air since 2008. The newest series The Evergreen is a weekly podcast highlighting stories from across the Pacific Northwest.

Notable TV and video productions include Oregon Field Guide and Oregon Art Beat, which first premiered in 1990 and 1999 respectively.

Table of OPB Shows
Title	Release date	Subject	Ended?	Ref.
All Science. No Fiction.	April 18, 2022	Science and Nature	No	
Class of 2025	December 11, 2013	Education	No	
Oregon Art Beat	1999	Art and Culture	No	
Oregon Experience	June 16, 2006	History	No	
Oregon Field Guide	April 16, 1990	Nature	No	
Superabundant	November 23, 2021	Food	No	

== See also ==
- Michael Husain – documentary filmmaker and producer; former OPB producer
- Barry Serafin – early OPB news reporter
- Soccer Made in Germany – 1980s highlights of West German soccer games, distributed nationwide by OPB
