= KOPB-TV =

Television station in Portland, Oregon

- Portland, Oregon; Vancouver, Washington; United States
- City: Portland, Oregon
- Channels: Digital: 10 (VHF); Virtual: 10
- Branding: OPB

Programming
- Subchannels: 10.1: OPB; 10.2: OPB World; 10.3: OPB Kids; 10.4: OPB FM
- Network: Oregon Public Broadcasting
- Affiliations: PBS, APT

Ownership
- Owner: Oregon Public Broadcasting

History
- First air date: February 6, 1961
- Former call signs: KOAP-TV (1961–1989)
- Former channel numbers: Analog: 10 (VHF, 1961–2009); Digital: 27 (UHF, 2001–2009)
- Former affiliations: NET (1961–1970)
- Call sign meaning: Oregon Public Broadcasting

Technical information
- Licensing authority: FCC
- Facility ID: 50589
- ERP: 46 kW
- HAAT: 524 m (1,719 ft)
- Transmitter coordinates: 45°31′20.5″N 122°44′49.5″W

Links
- Public license information: Public file; LMS
- Website: www.opb.org

KOPB-TV (channel 10) is a PBS member television station in Portland, Oregon, United States, owned by Oregon Public Broadcasting (OPB) as the flagship station of its television network. The station's studios are located at OPB's headquarters on South Macadam Avenue in Portland, and its transmitter is located on NW Skyline Boulevard inside Forest Park in the city's Sylvan-Highlands section.

== History ==
KOPB-TV originally signed on the air as KOAP-TV, on February 6, 1961. The call sign letters stood for "Oregon Agricultural Portland", preceded by the "K" prefix the Federal Communications Commission uses when assigning call signs for stations west of the Mississippi River. It was a sattilite station for KOAC-TV in Corvallis, Oregon, whose call letters—carried over from KOAC-AM, which received them in the mid-1920s during its early years broadcasting as an AM radio station—stood for "Oregon Agricultural College" (Oregon State University's original name). KOAP-TV was first housed in a leased building at what is now known as 2828 SW Naito Parkway, with the transmitter being located on Council Crest. KOAP-TV was a member of NET, or National Educational Television (NET), carrying its programs. On April 30, 1962, KOAP-TV's FM sister service (KOAP-FM) signed on the air. By 1966, most local programs originated at KOAP-TV.

Originally known on-air as OEB (Oregon Educational Broadcasting), the organization running the station changed its name in early 1972 to OEPBS (Oregon Educational & Public Broadcasting Service). The network was spun off from the state board of education in October 1981 and renamed Oregon Public Broadcasting. At the same time, the network moved to Portland, and KOAP-FM/TV became the flagship stations. On February 15, 1989, KOAP changed their call letters to KOPB, for both radio and television.

OPB was a pioneer in HDTV. As early as March 5, 1997, OPB's experimental HDTV station transmitted a random-bit data stream. On September 15, 1997, OPB Portland was assigned the experimental call letters KAXC for channel 35. Then on October 11, 1997, at 4:37 p.m. KAXC became the first TV station in Oregon and one of the first on the west coast to transmit an HDTV picture. After experimentation ended, channel 35 was vacated. On December 7, 2001, KOPB-DT began operation on channel 27.

== Technical information ==
=== Analog-to-digital conversion ===
KOPB-TV shut down its analog signal, over VHF channel 10, on June 12, 2009, the official date on which full-power television stations in the United States transitioned from analog to digital broadcasts under federal mandate. The station's digital signal relocated from its pre-transition UHF channel 27 to VHF channel 10.
