= KOAC (AM) =

- Corvallis, Oregon; United States
- Frequency: 550 kHz

Programming
- Format: Public radio and talk
- Affiliations: NPR; APM; PRX

Ownership
- Owner: Oregon Public Broadcasting

History
- First air date: January 23, 1923
- Former call signs: KFDJ (1922–1925)
- Call sign meaning: Oregon Agricultural College (former name of Oregon State University)

Technical information
- Licensing authority: FCC
- Facility ID: 50587
- Class: B
- Power: 5,000 watts
- Transmitter coordinates: 44°38′5.3″N 123°11′41.8″W

Links
- Public license information: Public file; LMS
- Webcast: Listen live
- Website: opb.org

KOAC (550 AM) is a non-commercial radio station licensed to Corvallis, Oregon, United States. The station is owned by Oregon Public Broadcasting, and airs OPB's news and talk programming, consisting of public radio shows from NPR, American Public Media and the Public Radio Exchange, as well as locally produced offerings. It is operated from OPB's studios and offices on South Macadam Avenue in Portland.

The transmitter is located off of NE Granger Avenue near U.S. Route 20 in Albany. Due to its transmitter power and location near the bottom of the AM dial, its daytime signal provides at least secondary coverage from Portland to Roseburg. It is the only directional AM radio station in the United States which uses a shunt-fed antenna.

== History ==
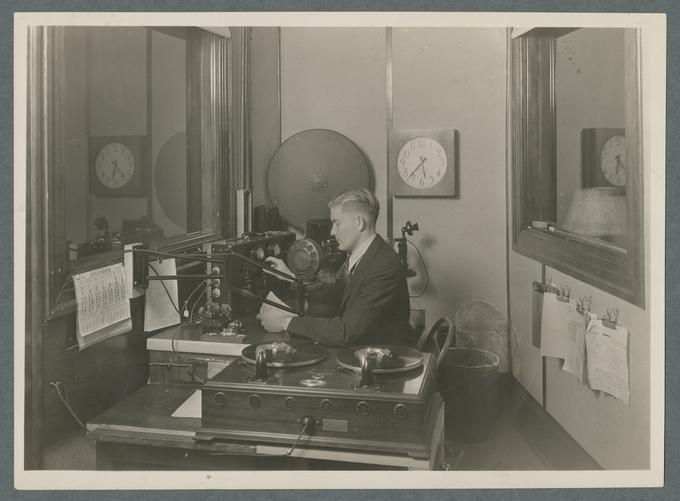
KOAC announcer broadcasting from the studios in Covell Hall at Oregon State University (1929).

KOAC is one of the oldest radio stations in Oregon. It was first licensed, with the sequentially assigned call letters KFDJ, to Oregon Agricultural College (now Oregon State University) on December 7, 1922. It made its debut broadcast on January 23, 1923.

Its call sign became KOAC — the last three letters being the initials of Oregon Agricultural College — in late 1925. KOAC was one of a number of AM stations started by universities in the early days of radio as a way to experiment in the new medium and train future broadcasters. Unlike most early radio stations that had to share a frequency with other stations, KOAC was eventually able to have a frequency to itself full-time.

In the 1930s, it was powered at 1,000 watts.

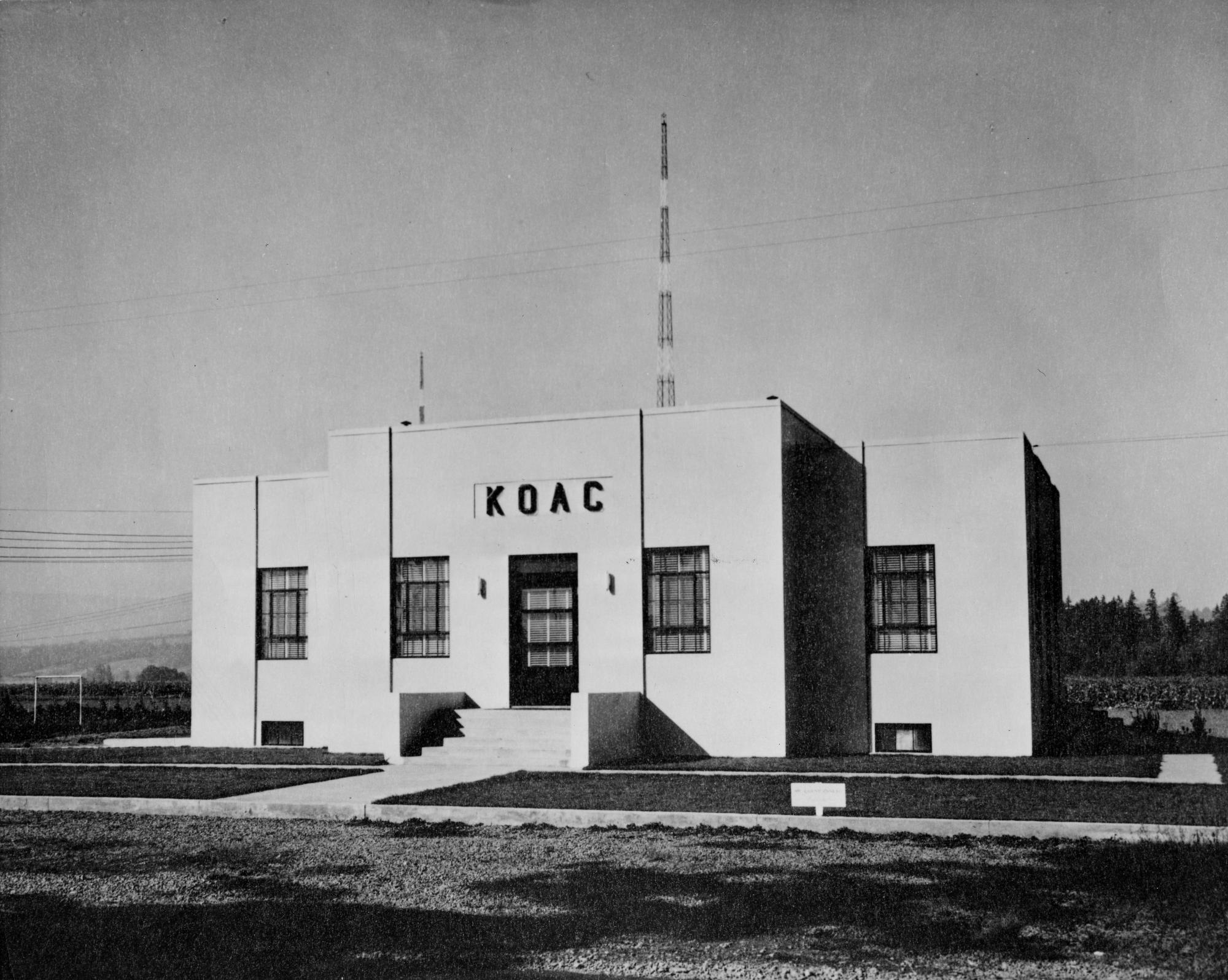
KOAC Radio building, circa 1941

In 1932, the station's management was transferred from Oregon State College to the Oregon State Board of Higher Education's General Extension Division. However, the state headquarters and network studios remained at the university's campus in Corvallis.

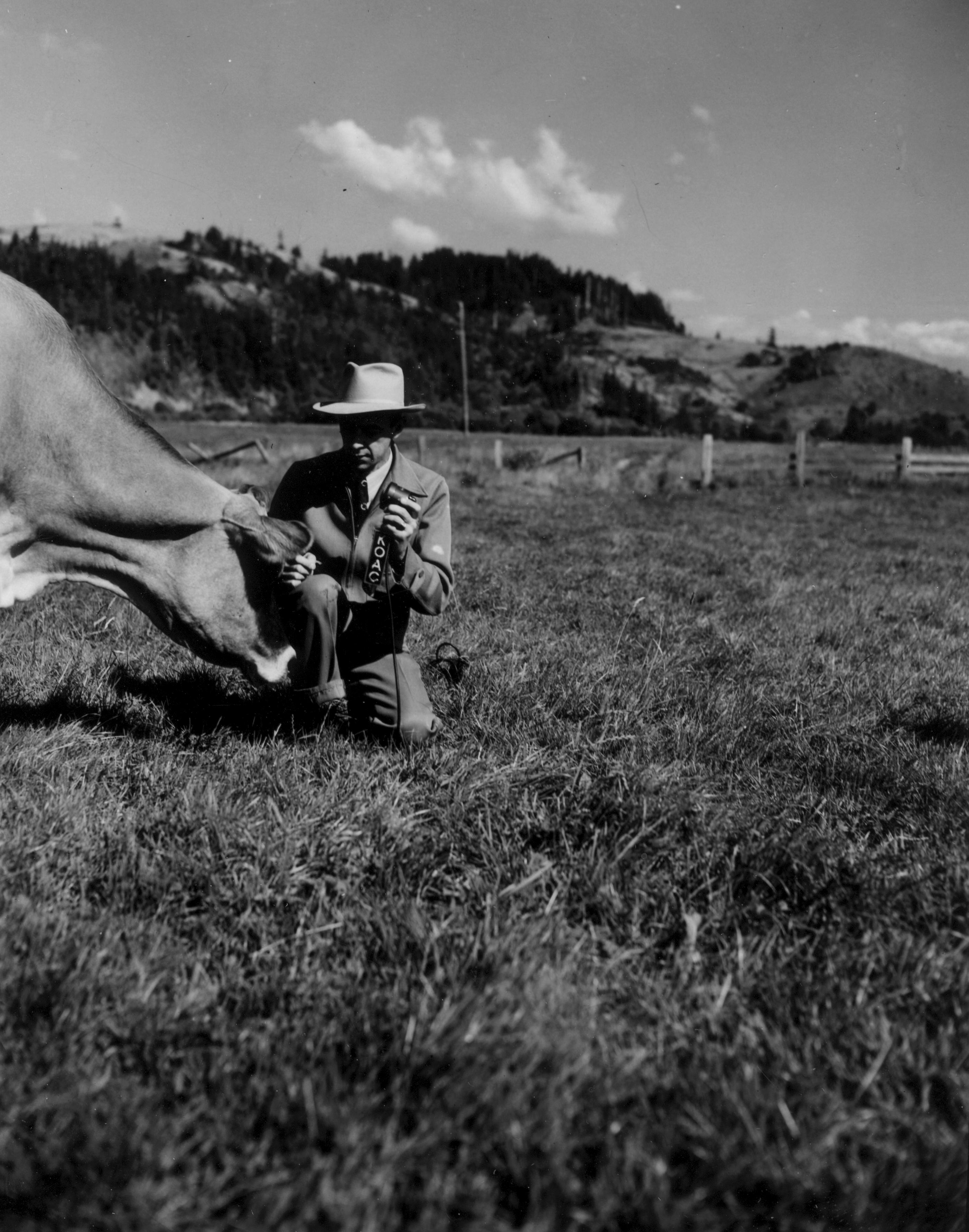
Field reporter Arnold Ebert entertains listeners during his parody of an interview with a cow (1950).

The first broadcasts by KOAC were made from the original campus studio in Kearny Hall in 1923.

From 1928 to 2006, KOAC's studios were on campus in Covell Hall, where OSU faculty and students broadcast educational programs and later live news programs across the state. Starting in the 1950s, the board signed on a number of simulcast radio stations in Portland, Eugene and other communities. It also began a sister network of television stations fronted by KOAC-TV (channel 7, which signed on in 1957). This group became known as Oregon Educational Broadcasting, with KOAC AM-TV as flagship stations. OEB evolved into the Oregon Educational and Public Broadcasting Service (OEPBS) in 1971.

The radio and TV studios remained on the Corvallis campus until 1981. The network was then spun-off from the Board of Higher Education and became a separate state agency known as Oregon Public Broadcasting. At that time, the satellite stations in Portland, KOAP-FM-TV (now KOPB-FM-TV), became the flagship stations.
