= KOPB-FM =

Oregon Public Broadcasting radio station in Portland

Coordinates: 45.522°N 122.747°W

- Portland, Oregon; United States
- Broadcast area: Northwest Oregon - Southwest Washington
- Frequency: 91.5 MHz (HD Radio)
- Branding: OPB Radio

Programming
- Format: Public Radio - News - Talk
- Affiliations: National Public Radio (NPR); American Public Media; Public Radio Exchange (PRX); BBC World Service

Ownership
- Owner: Oregon Public Broadcasting

History
- First air date: April 30, 1962
- Former call signs: KOAP-FM (1962–1989)
- Former frequencies: 92.3 MHz (1962–1963)
- Call sign meaning: Oregon Public Broadcasting

Technical information
- Licensing authority: FCC
- Facility ID: 50607
- Class: C0
- ERP: 73,000 watts
- HAAT: 470 meters (1,540 ft)

Links
- Public license information: Public file; LMS
- Webcast: Listen live
- Website: opb.org

KOPB-FM (91.5 FM) is a non-commercial, listener-supported radio station licensed to Portland, Oregon. It is owned by Oregon Public Broadcasting as the flagship of the radio network of the organization and airs a public radio news and talk format. It is a member station of National Public Radio (NPR), American Public Media, the Public Radio Exchange (PRX), and airs the BBC World Service overnight. KOPB-FM serves as the flagship station for OPB, simulcast on multiple stations and FM translators in Oregon. It is a primary entry point station for the Emergency Alert System. Its studios are located at the organization's headquarters, radio, and television studios on South Macadam Avenue in Portland.

KOPB-FM is a Class C0 station with an effective radiated power (ERP) of 73,000 watts. The transmitter is off NW Skyline Boulevard, inside Forest Park in Portland.

== History ==
The station signed on the air on April 30, 1962, replacing KEX-FM. Its original call sign was KOAP-FM and it broadcast at 92.3 on the FM dial. The following year, it moved to 91.5 MHz, in the section of the FM band set aside for non-commercial stations. In 1967, the commercial station that today is KGON began broadcasting at 92.3 MHz.

KOAP-FM changed its call letters to KOPB-FM in 1989 to identify with Oregon Public Broadcasting, its parent company.
