= KYTE =

- Independence, Oregon; United States
- Broadcast area: Benton, Lane, Lincoln, Linn, Marion and Yamhill Counties in Oregon
- Frequency: 102.7 MHz
- Branding: 102.7 KYTE FM

Programming
- Format: Hot adult contemporary

Ownership
- Owner: Yaquina Bay Communications
- Sister stations: KBCH, KCRF-FM, KNCU, KNPT, KWDP

History
- First air date: October 25, 1976 (as KNPT-FM at 102.5)
- Last air date: 2023
- Former call signs: KNPT-FM (1976–1984); KBKN (1984–1985); KNPT-FM (1985–1986); KYQT (1986–1991)
- Former frequencies: 102.5 MHz (1976–1988)
- Call sign meaning: "Kite"

Technical information
- Licensing authority: FCC
- Facility ID: 9848
- Class: C0
- ERP: 37,000 watts
- HAAT: 648 meters (2,126 ft)
- Transmitter coordinates: 44°47′50″N 123°32′32″W

Links
- Public license information: Public file; LMS
- Website: www.kytefm.com

KYTE (102.7 FM, "102.7 KYTE FM") was a radio station licensed to serve Independence, Oregon, United States. The station was owned by Yaquina Bay Communications.

== Programming ==
KYTE previously broadcast a hot adult contemporary music format.

== History ==
This station began regular broadcasting as KNPT-FM in Newport, Oregon, on October 25, 1976, on a frequency of 102.5 MHz and aired a beautiful music format. In May 1979, Yaquina Radio, Inc., reached an agreement to sell this station to Charmar Broadcasting, Inc. The FCC approved the deal on July 20, 1979. The station was moved to 102.7 MHz on September 24, 1988.

Facing financial difficulties, an application was made in September 1986 to involuntarily transfer the broadcast license for this station from Charmar Broadcasting, Inc., to Dennis P. McManus, acting as receiver. The FCC approved the transfer on October 16, 1986. McManus arranged a sale of the station to Central Coast Broadcasting Company, Inc. The new owners had the call sign changed to KYQT on November 10, 1986. The station was assigned the KYTE call sign by the FCC on January 1, 1991.

In October 1995, Central Coast Broadcasting Company, Inc. agreed to sell this station to Yaquina Bay Communications, Inc. The FCC approved the deal on December 8, 1995. Eventually, the station changed formats from Adult Contemporary to Hot AC.

On September 5, 2017, KYTE changed its transmitter location (expanding its signal coverage to Salem and the Mid-Willamette Valley) and changed its city of license from Newport, Oregon, to Independence, Oregon. (info taken from stationintel.com)

KYTE's license was cancelled on January 7, 2023. Even though the license was cancelled, KYTE was illegally broadcasting on January 10, 2023.
