= Nye Beach =

Central district in Newport, Oregon, U.S.

Coordinates: 44°38′28″N 124°03′37″W

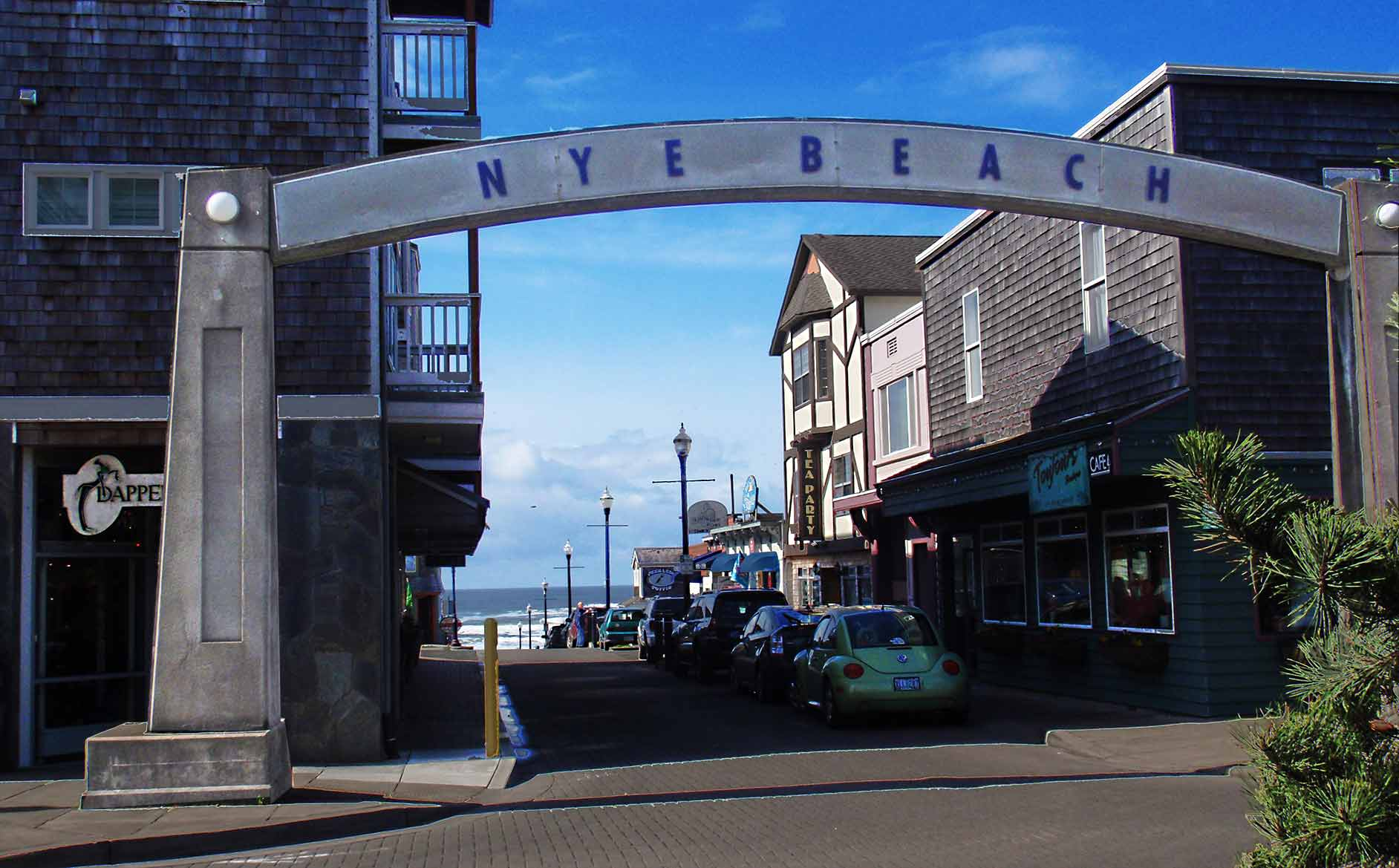
Nye Beach Arch on Coast Street

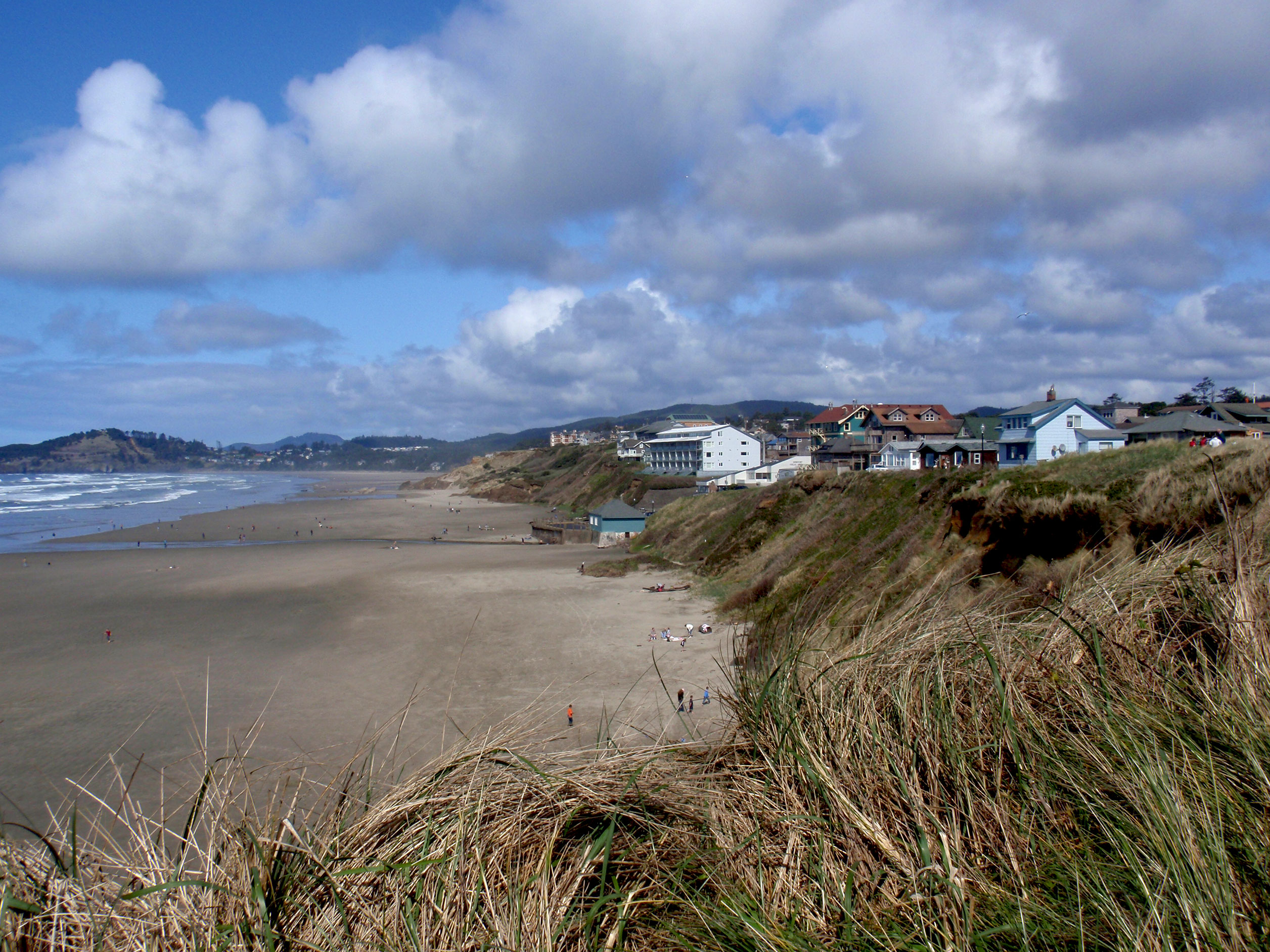
Nye Beach, March 2010

Nye Beach is a central district in Newport in the U.S. state of Oregon. The Nye Beach historic overlay district is bounded on the north and south sides by Northwest Twelfth Street and Southwest Second Street respectively; on the east side by Hurbert Street and on the west side by the Pacific Ocean. Situated on a sea cliff, the district has been a popular vacation spot since the late 19th century. Cultural and literary groups such as Oregon Coast Council for the Arts, Yaquina Art Association, and Writers on the Edge are based in Nye Beach, as are Newport's Performing Arts and Visual Arts Centers. The beach attracts tide-pool enthusiasts and beachcombers as well as surfers, sail-boarders, crabbers, clam diggers, kite flyers, photographers, and artists and has also been the site of marine and geological research projects.

== Changing coastline ==
In the early 1800s, the beach that would become Nye Beach was demarcated to the south by the Yaquina River and a rocky outcropping known as Jump-off Joe. In those days, Jump-off Joe extended into the sea and posed an obstacle to beach traffic. By the mid-20th century, coastal erosion had caused the sea stack to separate from the cliff, develop an arch, and finally crumble, leaving only a scattering of rock formations to mark the spot. Without this natural barrier nothing remains to separate Nye Beach from Agate Beach State Recreation Site to the north.

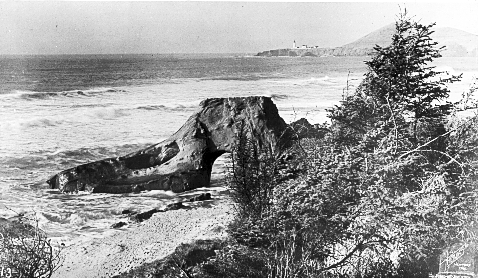
Jump-off Joe and Nye Beach in 1910

Since the demise of Jump-off Joe, at least one (and possibly more) similar, but less imposing, outcroppings have appeared, carved by coastal erosion from the sea cliff. "Slipper Rock," a few hundred feet south of the original Jump-off Joe, resembled its predecessor, complete with arch, and in time met a similar fate. A 2004 geological report on the Oregon coast refers to the entire slide area north of Nye Creek as the Jump-off Joe landslide block.

In 1942 a landslide took out about 15 acres (6 ha) of coastal land and downed a number of houses at the Jump-off Joe site; other homes in the area were undermined by subsequent erosion.

In 1980 a condominium development under construction near the "Slipper" site also collapsed.

Remnants of both events can still be seen. Broken cement walls and footings in the Slipper area are visible from the sea.

Jump-off Joe was a significant coastal feature, like its more stable neighbor, Yaquina Head. Yaquina Head is mainly composed of basalt and breccia, susceptible to erosion at a much slower rate than the sandstone of Jump-off Joe.

== History ==
In the early 1800s, the coastal land that became Nye Beach was part of the sprawling Coast Indian Reservation. By 1865, the Indian population of the area was severely diminished and so the United States government opened it for homesteading.

John Nye homesteaded the Nye Creek area in 1865, when it was a semi-wilderness. At the time, Yaquina Bay frontage was the primary destination of visitors to Newport. Nye Beach lacked any approach by road and was edged by cliffs. A stream (Nye Creek), had carved an opening in the sea cliff, an access point that would become the heart of the Nye Beach district. This spot later became known as "the Turnaround."

By the 1890s, summer vacationers found their way to Nye Creek. In 1891, a boardwalk connected Nye Creek to the bay front. Within two years, the boardwalk had become a road, and summer crowds gathered on the beach at Nye Creek for band concerts and other entertainment.

Nye Beach attracted artists, writers and students of natural science. This tradition dates back to 1896 when a four-day summer teachers' conference was held in Newport. In 1897, a group of summer residents associated with various colleges and known as the Summer Educational Association (SEA) achieved the building of an auditorium in the Nye Creek area. Summer teaching sessions were held for four seasons between 1897 and 1902. Classes in "Science, Music, Mirth, Art and Religion" were offered. SEA summer sessions were discontinued in 1903, but the reputation of Nye Creek as a mecca for the literary, scholarly and artistic was established. The SEA auditorium fell into disuse and was demolished in 1910, its lumber probably reused to build summer cabins.

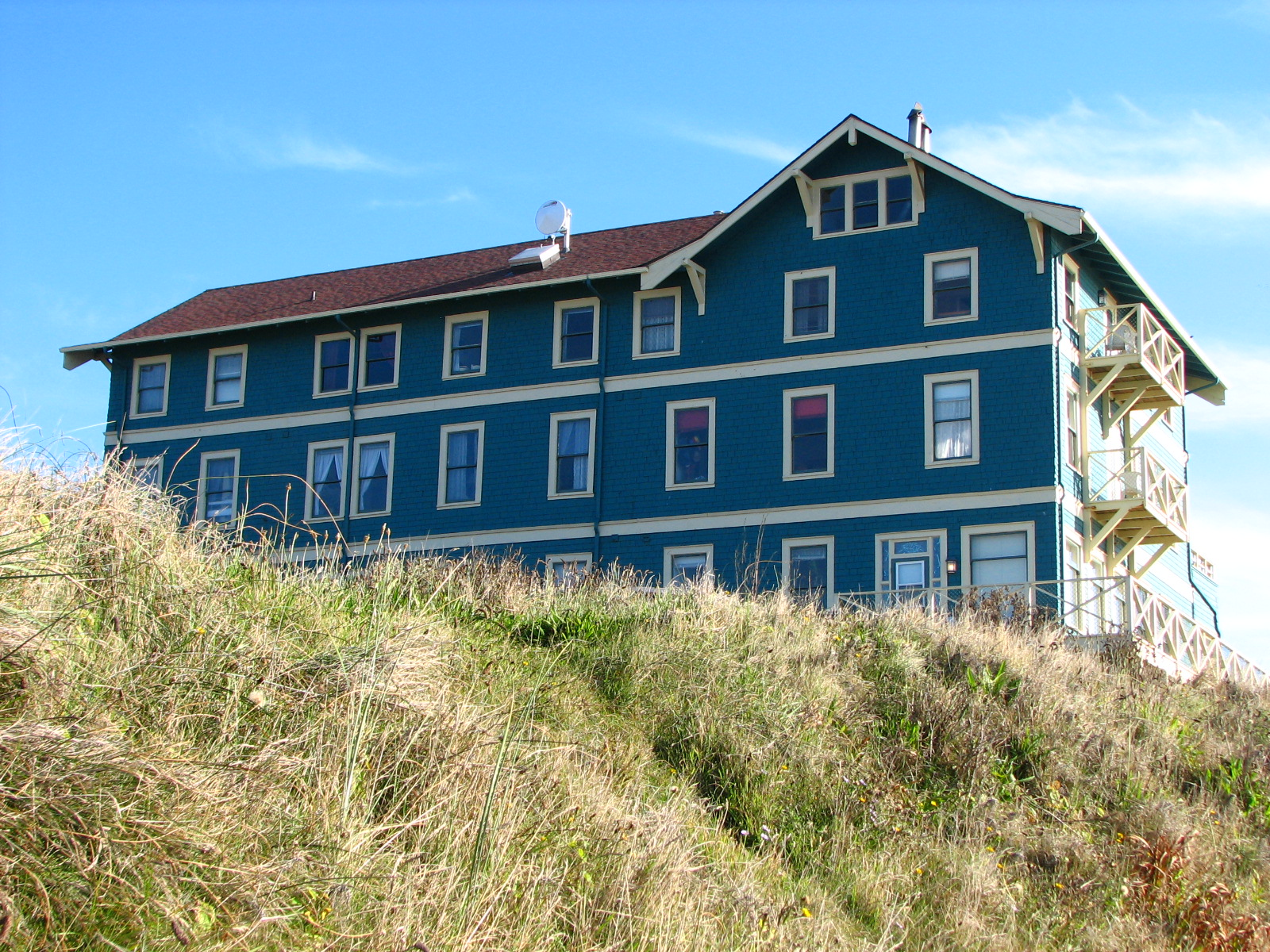
The New Cliff House (Sylvia Beach Hotel) in Nye Beach is on the National Register of Historic Places.

By the close of the 19th century, numerous summer cottages populated the area and camping enthusiasts pitched tents in campgrounds established along Nye Creek. By 1902 shops began to appear, soon followed by boarding houses, hotels and recreational attractions. The Cliff House Hotel, completed in 1913, still stands on a Nye Beach sea cliff, having morphed first into the Hotel Gilmore (1921) and again in 1986 into a whimsical haven for readers and writers, the Sylvia Beach Hotel.

In 1901 a bath house (offering changing rooms for surf bathers) was erected at the Nye Creek beach entrance.

In 1902 Henry J. Minthorn, a physician with an interest in hot springs and sanitoria, moved to Newport and set up ocean-water baths. He practiced medicine in the city through 1922.

In 1911 the bath house at Nye Creek was demolished and replaced by a natatorium, offering heated sea-water bathing and sunbathing rooms. It remained a popular attraction for decades. Destroyed by fire in 1922, it was promptly rebuilt. The reconstructed natatorium had an elaborate domed roof and besides the swimming pool, offered a dance hall, movie theater, bowling, and roller skating.

Eventually the Natatorium lost popularity and fell into disrepair. A photo from 1966 shows it with a "4-SALE" sign. It was eventually demolished and the vacant grounds became a picnic area and parking lot at the Nye Beach Turnaround. All that remains of the former complex is one building that used to provide public restrooms, but is now the Yaquina Art Gallery.

By the mid-1920s, during Prohibition, Newport had paved streets and curbs, and a cement breakwater was under construction. The enthusiastic building of vacation beach cottages continued through 1920s, with guests arriving from Albany by train, ferryboat, and "coaches" (buses). Visitors to Nye Creek could choose lodgings from the Rose City Cottages, the Panama Cottages, the Sunny Side, the Cherry City Cottages, the Hub Cottages, Sunset Cottages, Linger Longer Lodge, the Model Campground, the Nicolai Hotel and the Hotel Gilmore.

Early transportation to Newport had relied mainly on rail, with trains from Albany arriving at Yaquina City, where passengers could board a ferryboat to Yaquina Bay. Optimism for Newport's early growth was based on the expectation that the railway would eventually reach Newport. It never did. In 1928, the Southern Pacific Railroad stopped service to Yaquina City. This may have put a temporary damper on the tourist business, but by 1930 highway projects were underway that would make the area more accessible than ever.

Construction of the "Roosevelt" Highway (now Coast Highway) began in 1919. It was to run the length of the Oregon Coast. Newport would soon have a highway connection with Lincoln City to the north and with Waldport to the south (though ferries were required to cross both Yaquina Bay and Alsea Bay).

The new Salmon River Highway (now Highway 18) would connect Grand Ronde and Otis (north of Lincoln City), opening a new route to the coastal highway.

By 1936 bridges across the Rogue River, Alsea River, Yaquina Bay, Coos Bay, and Umpqua River were all complete and the Oregon Coast was fully accessible to automobile traffic.

Throughout the 1940s, Nye Beach continued to evolve its unique character. During World War II, the beach was patrolled by blimps and by local citizens with dogs and rifles, guarding the country from the threat of marine invasion. Also in the 1940s some distinctive homes were built, contributing to what became known as the "Nye Beach style." Many of these homes have endured, for example, the Grand Victorian, now a bed-and-breakfast.

The Graphic Novel Gilmore By the Sea by Ed Cameron describes 1980s Nye Beach as a rough and tumble neighborhood. But by the twenty-first century, Nye Beach was on its way to becoming a self-conscious community with its own merchant organization, modern architecture and community cultural events. In 2007 the multimillion-dollar Archway Place with upscale shopping at ground level and costly condos on its second and third floors was constructed on the former site of Cozy Corner Confectionery (a 1920s grocery). Similar projects followed. The densely commercial Coast Street was refurbished with retro paving stones and custom curbs. Two cement archways were constructed over the approach to the Turnaround and behind the Visual Arts Center.

Few of the historic cottages survived. Some are rentals or shops, though most have fallen to the demand for renovation. Many were replaced in the 1980s by condominiums. Others later yielded ground to modern hotels like the Elizabeth Street Inn and the Inn at Nye Beach], the first hotel on the Oregon coast designed to minimize its environmental impact via such things as a 58-panel solar array that can produce over 16,000 watts of electricity. Built in 2010, the Inn at Nye Beach (formerly the Greenstone Inn) acquired the site of the original Hub Cottages (later known as the Viking's Cottages, for decades the oldest continuously operating motel in Oregon).

In the 21st century, the Performing Arts Center(1988) and the Visual Arts Center(1985) share their neighborhood with the Yaquina Art Gallery. Rare book stores, boutiques, an astrologer, spas, galleries, bistros, pubs, wine shops, and restaurants share the scene with an animal hospital, a historic laundry, a real estate office, and an ambulance service.

== People ==
=== John Nye ===
John Nye was born in Ohio in 1832. In 1859 he headed west with a team oxen which he traded for horses in Salt Lake City, Utah. He reached Corvallis, Oregon in 1860. After plying several trades, including a stint at the Rock Creek mines in British Columbia, soldiering in the Union Army, and road building on present-day Highway 20, he found his way to the Oregon coast.

In 1865 he acquired a homestead on the section of land known afterward as Nye Creek and later as Nye Beach. He built a cabin at what would be the corner of Brook and Third Streets in Nye Beach. He probably attempted mining the creek, which ran by his cabin. After 19 months, he had fulfilled the homestead residence requirement. Then he traveled to Indiana, married Olive Kist, returned to Oregon and settled for a time in Corvallis. When Nye had his coastal property platted, he named Olive Street after his bride. In 1874 the Nyes returned to Newport, moving onto another homestead property, east of town. On those 160 acres (65 ha), he and Olive farmed, raised eight children, and lived for the rest of their lives.

John Nye sold the Nye Creek claim to developer Sam Irvin in 1880. Irvin promoted Newport tourism in the 1880s.

=== Ed Seidler ===
In 1901 Ed Seidler built the original bathhouse at Nye Creek, now the Nye Beach Turnaround.

=== John Minthorn ===
In 1902 Minthorn, a physician, established a sanitarium in Nye Creek. It offered hot seawater baths. Minthorn, from Newberg, was the uncle of Herbert Hoover and raised him as his son from the age of 10. At first only a summer visitor to Newport, Minthorn eventually became a year-round resident. The Minthorn House is one of the historic houses still preserved in Nye Beach in 2013.

=== Donald A. Davis ===
Newport City Manager from to 1962 to 1992. The Don Davis park in Nye Beach was named to honor his leadership.
