= Agate Beach, Oregon =

Unincorporated community in Oregon, United States

- Unincorporated community
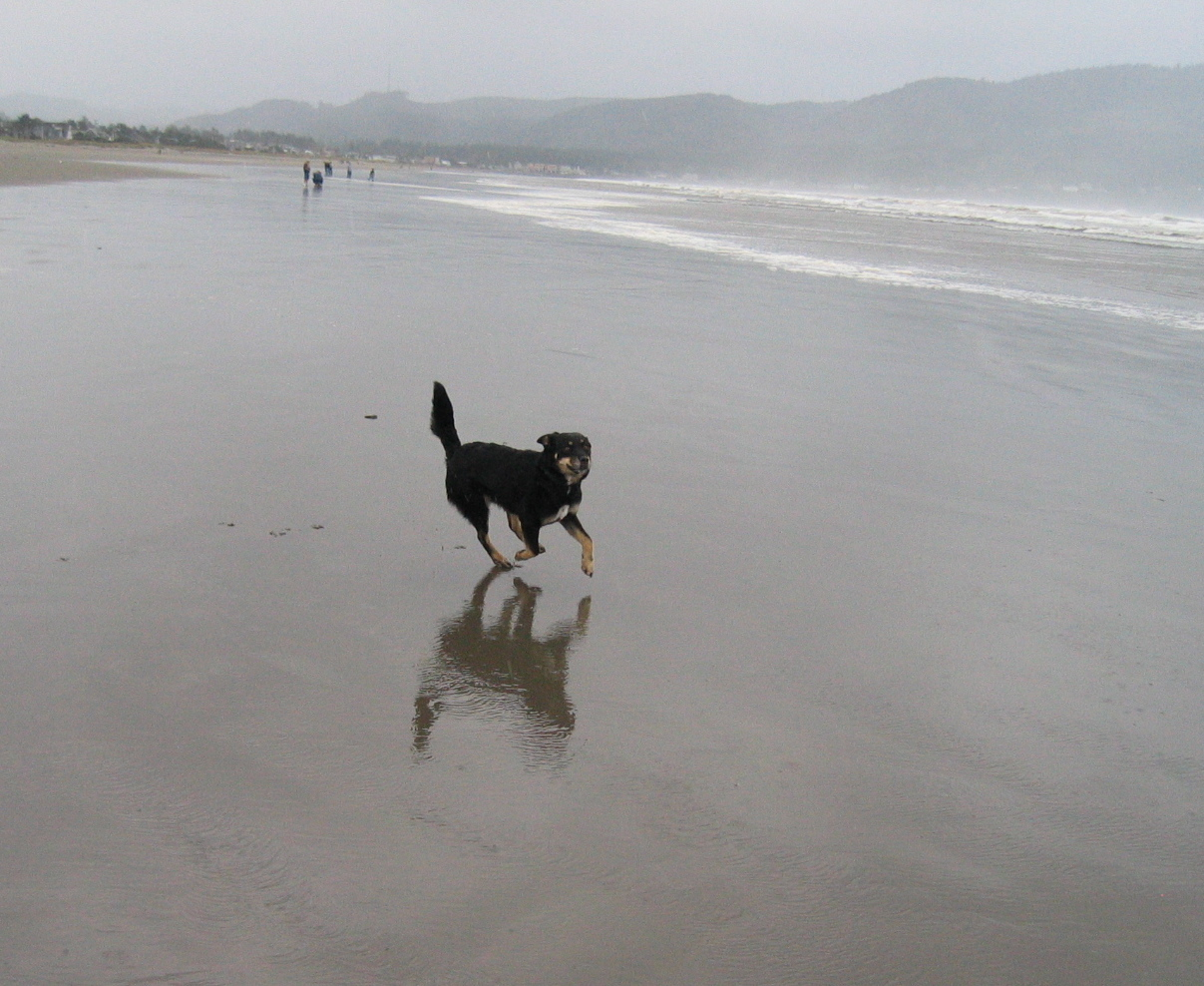
- Beach at Agate Beach at low tide

- Location within Oregon Location within the United States
- Coordinates: 44°40′38″N 124°03′42″W
- Country: United States
- State: Oregon
- County: Lincoln
- Elevation: 157 ft (48 m)
- Time zone: UTC-8 (PST)
  - Summer (DST): UTC-7 (PDT)
- Coordinates and elevation from United States Geological Survey

Agate Beach is an unincorporated community in Lincoln County, Oregon, United States. Agate Beach is named for the agates that are found on the beaches of the Pacific Ocean between Newport and Yaquina Head. Agate Beach post office was established in 1912 and closed in 1971.

Historically, the area's most famous citizen was composer Ernest Bloch, who spent his later years in the community. The 1914 Ernest Bloch House is on the National Register of Historic Places and was once owned by the son of Asahel Bush and his family.

In June 2012 a 165-ton floating dock dislodged from the March 2011 Japanese tsunami washed up ashore, creating a popular tourist attraction as well as an imperative to remove potential invasive species.

== See also ==
- Agate Beach State Recreation Site
