= KSHY-LP =

Newport, Oregon; United States
- Frequency: 94.3 MHz

Programming
- Format: Defunct (was Religious)

Ownership
- Owner: Sacred Heart of Jesus Educational Association

Technical information
- Licensing authority: FCC
- Facility ID: 134994
- Class: L1
- ERP: 21 watts
- HAAT: 65.0 meters (213.3 ft)

Links
- Public license information: LMS

KSHY-LP (94.3 FM) was a low-power radio station broadcasting a religious format. Licensed to Newport, Oregon, United States, the station is currently owned by Sacred Heart of Jesus Educational Association.
