= Jump Off Joe (disambiguation) =

Jump Off Joe may refer to:

- Jump-off Joe, a collapsed sea stack off the coast of Newport, Oregon, U.S.
- Jump Off Joe (Washington), a butte in the Horse Heaven Hills in the U.S. State of Washington
- Jump Off Joe station 1883–1886, now in Merlin, Oregon, U.S.
