= KWDP =

- Waldport, Oregon; United States
- Broadcast area: Lincoln County, Oregon
- Frequency: 820 kHz

Programming
- Format: Defunct (was adult standards)

Ownership
- Owner: David J. Miller; (Yaquina Bay Communications, Inc.)
- Sister stations: KBCH, KCRF-FM, KNCU, KNPT

History
- First air date: July 1, 1988 (as KBBM at 850)
- Last air date: December 31, 2023 (35 years, 183 days)
- Former call signs: KBBM (1986–1990); KDRC (1990–1991); KORC (1991–2011)
- Former frequencies: 850 kHz (1988–1993)
- Call sign meaning: Waldport

Technical information
- Facility ID: 30574
- Class: D
- Power: 1,000 watts (day); 15 watts (night)
- Transmitter coordinates: 44°26′16.4″N 124°01′14.4″W

Links
- Webcast: Listen live
- Website: www.kwdpam.com

KWDP (820 AM) was a radio station licensed to serve the community of Waldport, Oregon, United States. The station, which began broadcasting in 1988, was owned by David J. Miller and the broadcast license was held by Yaquina Bay Communications, Inc. The station, which had been temporarily dark for financial reasons, returned to the air simulcasting KBCH (1400 AM, Lincoln City, Oregon) in May 2011.

== Programming ==
This station long broadcast an easy listening music format under the KORC call sign until the station fell silent on April 1, 2009, due to "financial difficulties". After a sale to new owners was consummated in January 2010, KORC returned to the air with a classic rock music format branded as "The Crab" on March 10, 2010. KORC fell silent again on November 1, 2010. After another new owner for the station was found, the station returned to the air as KWDP on May 2, 2011, simulcasting KNPT from Newport from 6:00 a.m. to 10:00 a.m. weekdays. The rest of the day, the station airs an adult standards format plus local news and sports including Waldport High School sports, Oregon State Beavers football and basketball, and Portland Trail Blazers basketball.

== History ==
=== The beginning ===
This station received its original construction permit from the Federal Communications Commission on April 1, 1986. The new AM station was authorized to broadcast with 250 watts of power, daytime-only, on a frequency of 850 kHz to serve Waldport, Oregon. The new station was assigned the call letters KBBM by the FCC on April 23, 1986. KBBM signed on July 1, 1988, and received its license to cover from the FCC on November 21, 1988.

=== Sold ===
In November 1989, owner Edward C. McElroy, Jr., filed an application with the FCC to transfer the broadcast license for KBBM to a new company owned by James Girard called KBBM Radio, Inc. The transfer was approved by the FCC on December 29, 1989, and the transaction was consummated on February 1, 1990. The new owners immediately applied for new call letters and the station was assigned KDRC by the FCC on March 6, 1990. This change lasted just over a year as the station applied for another new, but similar, call sign and was assigned KORC on April 25, 1991.

Logo from station's days at KORC.

In April 1992, Rod Wolfe, acting as executor of the estate of James Girard, the now-deceased owner of KBBM Radio, Inc., reached an agreement to sell this station to Jarvis Communications, Inc. The deal was approved by the FCC on July 21, 1992, and the transaction was consummated on August 3, 1992.

=== Move to 820 ===
The FCC authorized KORC to add nighttime operation, albeit with just 10 watts of power, with a construction permit issued on April 22, 1993. Less than three weeks later, the station applied for further authorization to change frequencies to 820 kHz, increase its daytime signal power to 1,000 watts, and boost its nighttime signal (which is limited to protect clear-channel station WBAP, also on 820 kHz) to 15 watts.

In November 2002, Jarvis Communications, Inc. (Matt Jarvis, owner/general manager) announced an agreement to sell this station to Total Access, Inc., for a reported sale price of $185,500. The deal was approved by the FCC on December 30, 2002, and the transaction was consummated on January 1, 2003.

=== The Profitt era ===
This ownership change would prove short-lived as Total Access, Inc., reached an agreement in August 2003 to sell this station to Larry D. and Margaret E. Profitt, a General Partnership, for $185,000, just $500 short of the price they paid at the beginning of the year. The Profitts bought the station after Larry Profitt retired as the chief of police of Rio Vista, California, and the couple took a vacation trip through Oregon. At the time of the sale, the KORC was broadcasting an easy listening music format. The deal was approved by the FCC on November 30, 2003, and the transaction was consummated on October 7, 2003.

In December 2007, the station added an emergency generator to its studio facilities. This gasoline-powered equipment allows the station to continue broadcasting during a power outage.

=== Falling silent ===
Owners Larry D. and Margaret E. Profitt put KORC up for sale in early 2008 for an asking price of $285,000 with plans to use the money for their retirement. When no deal could be reached they dropped the asking price first to $199,000 then finally to $129,000 in March 2009. On March 30, 2009, KORC management informed the FCC that the station would go dark on April 1, 2009, and applied for temporary authority to remain silent for up to six months. The reason stated in the application was "financial difficulties".

Just before the station was to fall silent, a tentative purchase deal was reached with Georgia Triangle Broadcasting. They operated the station with a hard rock music format with shock jock programming as the "Rocket Radio Network" for a short time before deciding not to complete the transaction. The station fell silent on May 16, 2009, and a new application for remain-silent authority, again citing financial reasons, was accepted for filing on June 8, 2009. The Commission granted this temporary authority on January 6, 2010, with a scheduled expiration of May 17, 2010—at which time the station would have been off the air for a full year and their license subject to automatic forfeiture.

=== Reed-Nickerson era ===
Unable to sell the station or resume broadcasting, the Profitts had planned to have the broadcast tower disassembled on October 31, 2009, until a new ownership group made a successful bid to acquire the station. KORC filed an application with the FCC on November 23, 2009, to transfer the broadcast license for this station to KORC, Inc., for a reported total of $33,000. KORC Radio, Inc., is wholly owned by Leighton M. Reed-Nickerson and Joan M. Reed-Nickerson. The Commission approved this application on January 7, 2010, and the transaction was consummated on January 25, 2010. The station returned to the air on March 10, 2010, with a classic rock music format branded as "The Crab".

On March 11, 2010, KORC Radio, Inc., filed an application with the FCC for a daytime power increase to 5,000 watts. The FCC granted a new construction permit for this change on July 28, 2010, with a scheduled July 28, 2013, expiration date. Also in March 2010, the KORC studios were moved to a larger facility at 140 Verbina Street in Waldport. A new transmitter building was constructed and a new generator and uninterruptible power supply were installed.

On April 19, 2010 KORC began an affiliation with the CBS Radio Network. The station fell silent on November 1, 2010, for "financial reasons" and applied to the FCC for special authority to remain silent until economic conditions improve. The FCC granted this authority on December 9, 2010, with a scheduled expiration date of June 7, 2011. Even with this authority, the station's broadcast license would have expired automatically if KORC did not resume normal broadcast operations before November 2, 2011. The Reed-Nickersons, the station's current owners, announced to the press that they intended to disassemble the broadcast tower for use at another location. They hoped to sell the station's license and remaining assets for $35,000 before the license expired.

=== New owners ===
In April 2011, KORC Radio, Inc., found a buyer in David J. Miller of Newport, Oregon. He agreed to purchase the station with his wholly owned Yaquina Bay Communications, Inc., as the broadcast license holder. The FCC accepted the station's filing on April 18, 2011, and approved the sale on June 21, 2011. The transaction was formally consummated on July 25, 2011. Yaquina Bay Communications holds the licenses for KNPT and KYTE; owner David J. Miller's Pacific West Broadcasting, Inc., is the licensee for KBCH, KCRF-FM, and KNCU.

On May 2, 2011, the station returned to the air as a simulcast of KBCH (1400 AM) in Lincoln City, Oregon. The station returned with a new call sign as well, switching to KWDP on April 19, 2011, just one week shy of a 20-year run as KORC.

=== Shutdown ===
KWDP, along with its sister stations, shut down on December 31, 2023. (Note: KYTE had lost its license earlier in the year for operating at an unauthorized location for over three years.) The closure followed the August foreclosure of the stations' Newport studios, which were sold to Oregon Coast Bank in a sheriff's sale on December 5. The Federal Communications Commission cancelled the station’s license on January 8, 2025.
