= KBCH =

- Lincoln City, Oregon; United States
- Frequency: 1400 kHz

Programming
- Format: Adult standards; news–talk
- Affiliations: ABC News Radio; Westwood One

Ownership
- Owner: Yaquina Bay Communications; (Pacific West Broadcasting, Inc.)
- Sister stations: KCRF-FM, KNCU, KNPT, KWDP, KYTE

History
- First air date: May 27, 1955
- Former frequencies: 1400 kHz (1955–1960); 1380 kHz (1960–1981)
- Call sign meaning: Beach

Technical information
- Licensing authority: FCC
- Facility ID: 50004
- Class: C
- Power: 1,000 watts (unlimited)
- Transmitter coordinates: 44°59′27″N 123°58′45″W

Links
- Public license information: Public file; LMS

KBCH (1400 AM) is a radio station licensed to serve Lincoln City, Oregon, United States. The station, which began broadcasting in 1955, is owned by Pacific West Broadcasting, Inc.

== Programming ==
KBCH broadcast a mix of adult standards music and news/talk that features programing from ABC News Radio and Westwood One's America's Best Music format. KBCH aired local news, health updates, a tradio program, plus syndicated talk shows hosted by Jim Bohannon and Lars Larson. The KBCH music mix included such artists as Tony Bennett, Frank Sinatra, Nat "King" Cole, and The Carpenters.

The station also aired high school sports featuring the Taft High School Tigers, National Basketball Association games as a member of the Portland Trail Blazers radio network, and University of Oregon Ducks football and men's basketball.

== History ==
=== The beginning ===
This station began regular broadcast operations on May 27, 1955, with 250 watts of round-the-clock power on a frequency of 1400 kHz, licensed to serve Oceanlake, Oregon. The station was initially owned by Lincoln Electronics, Inc. Robert G. Beattie was named president of the company in January 1956. KBCH was the second radio station, after KNPT (1310 AM, Newport), established in Lincoln County, Oregon. The station requested the call sign KBCH to represent the "20 Miracle Miles" of beaches in Lincoln County, including Moolack Beach and Beverly Beach State Park.

=== Move to 1380 ===
KBCH was acquired by Yaquina Radio, Inc., on November 16, 1959. The new owners got authorization from the FCC to change frequencies to 1380 kHz and increase daytime power to 1,000 watts but at the sacrifice of becoming a daytime-only station. Further changes were in store as, in March 1965, the station changed its legal community of license from Oceanlake to Lincoln City, Oregon.

Yaquina Radio, Inc., sold KBCH to Lincoln City Broadcasting, Inc., in a transaction consummated on March 1, 1974. The new owners maintained KBCH's middle of the road contemporary music format.

In December 1978, Lincoln City Broadcasting, Inc., reached an agreement to sell this station to Brown Broadcasting Enterprises, Inc. The transaction was consummated on February 12, 1979.

=== Back to 1400 ===
The new owners filed an application with the FCC in April 1980 to change the station's broadcast frequency from 1380 back to 1400 kHz and restore nighttime service with 250 watts of power. The FCC granted the station a new construction permit that authorized the changes on March 26, 1981. The station began licensed operation on 1400 kHz on August 4, 1981.

In June 1986, Brown Broadcasting Enterprises, Inc., reached an agreement to sell this station to Matrix Media, Inc. The deal was approved by the FCC on August 4, 1986, and the transaction was consummated on September 19, 1986. After Matrix Media, Inc., had fallen into bankruptcy, trustee Thomas A. Huntsberger arranged to sell the broadcast license for this station in January 1990 to Oceanlake Broadcasting Company, Inc. The deal was approved by the FCC on July 31, 1990, and the transaction was consummated on August 15, 1990.

In April 1996, Oceanlake Broadcasting Company, Inc., contracted to sell this station to Q Media LLC. The deal was approved by the FCC on June 13, 1996, but the transaction was never consummated and control of KBCH remained with Oceanlake Broadcasting. The company reached a new agreement to sell this station in September 1999, this time to Yaquina Bay Communications, Inc., as part of a two-station deal valued at $425,000. The deal was approved by the FCC on October 27, 1999, and the transaction was consummated on August 8, 2000. In October 2000, Yaquina Bay Communications, Inc., reached an agreement to transfer the KBCH broadcast license to Pacific West Broadcasting, Inc. The transfer was approved by the FCC on October 27, 2000, and the transaction was consummated on November 15, 2000.

=== Shutdown and Subsequent Resumption of Operations ===
KBCH, along with its sister stations (KNPT and KNCU in Newport, KYTE (licensed to broadcast to Independence but actually broadcasting from Otter Crest), KCRF-FM in Lincoln City, and KWDP in Waldport), shut down on December 31, 2023. The closure followed the August foreclosure of the stations' Newport studios, which were sold to Oregon Coast Bank in a sheriff's sale on December 5. Yaquina Bay Communications owed four years in unpaid back taxes (some $40,000) and over $400,000 in overdue loans to Oregon Coast Bank. This ended 75 years of broadcast service from these six radio stations. The co-owner of Yaquina Bay Communications, David Miller cited over 50% reduction in advertising revenue during and after the COVID pandemic as the reason for the inability to pay the outstanding debts. On December 31, 2024, the station resumed operations. The station is operating from a rooftop at 800 Highway 101 in Lincoln City with 10 watts full time.
