= KNPT =

Defunct

Newport, Oregon; United States
- Broadcast area: Central Oregon Coast
- Frequency: 1310 kHz
- Branding: Newstalk 1310

Programming
- Format: Silent
- Affiliations: ABC News Radio, Westwood One

Ownership
- Owner: Yaquina Bay Communications, Inc.
- Sister stations: KBCH, KCRF-FM, KNCU, KWDP, KYTE

History
- First air date: June 28, 1948
- Last air date: December 31, 2023 (75 years, 186 days)
- Call sign meaning: Newport

Technical information
- Facility ID: 9853
- Class: B
- Power: 5,000 watts day; 1,000 watts night
- Transmitter coordinates: 44°37′40″N 123°59′15″W
- Translator(s): 98.3 K252EQ (Depoe Bay)

Links
- Webcast: Listen live
- Website: www.knptam.com

KNPT (1310 AM, "Newstalk 1310") was a radio station broadcasting a news–talk format. Licensed to Newport, Oregon, United States, the station was owned by Yaquina Bay Communications, Inc., and featured programming from ABC News Radio and Westwood One.

== History ==
KNPT signed on June 28, 1948, and was first licensed on February 2, 1949. Thomas R. Becker's Yaquina Radio sold the station and KNPT-FM 102.5 to Charmar Broadcasting (led by Charles F. King, a former general sales manager for KPAM-AM-FM in Portland) for $1 million in 1979. David Miller's Yaquina Bay Communications bought KNPT and KYTE (102.7; the former KNPT-FM) from Central Coast Broadcasting for $331,798.12 in 1995.

KNPT, along with its sister stations (KNCU in Newport, KBCH and KCRF-FM in Lincoln City, and KWDP in Waldport), shut down on December 31, 2023. (Note: KYTE, by then reallocated to Independence, had lost its license earlier in the year for operating at an unauthorized location for over three years.) The closure followed the August foreclosure of the stations' studios, which were sold to Oregon Coast Bank in a sheriff's sale on December 5. The Federal Communications Commission cancelled the station’s license on January 8, 2025.
