= KCRF-FM =

- Lincoln City, Oregon; United States
- Broadcast area: Central Oregon Coast
- Frequency: 96.7 MHz
- Branding: K-Surf Country

Programming
- Format: Country
- Affiliations: ABC News Radio

Ownership
- Owner: PACNW BROADCASTING,LLC
- Sister stations: KPPT

History
- First air date: November 1, 1981
- Former call signs: KCRF (8/1981-11/1981)
- Call sign meaning: "K-Surf"

Technical information
- Licensing authority: FCC
- Facility ID: 50003
- Class: C1
- ERP: 19,500 watts
- HAAT: 266 meters (873 ft)
- Transmitter coordinates: 44°45′22″N 124°2′57″W

Links
- Public license information: Public file; LMS
- Webcast: Listen Live
- Website: KCRF Online

KCRF-FM (96.7 MHz) is a radio station licensed to Lincoln City, Oregon, United States. The station is currently owned by PACNW BROADCASTING, LLC. It began operating in November 1981 as an adult contemporary station owned by a husband and wife, Charles Rowe and Kim Singer, who were also TV news anchors. Singer and then Rowe each departed to return to that profession, and the next owners declared bankruptcy in 1989. The station broadcast an oldies format as late as 1999 before flipping to classic rock. It left the air after a 2023 foreclosure, was sold, and returned to the air in May 2024. Ownership transferred to the Otter Rock Radio conglomerate July 1st, 2026 joining sister station 100.7 the Otter. K-Surf is now programmed in a Country music format.

== History ==
The station was assigned the call letters KCRF on August 3, 1981; it signed on November 1. It was built by the Rainbow Broadcasting Company and originally offered a middle-of-the-road, adult contemporary music format. Rainbow was owned by a husband and wife, Charles Rowe and Kim Singer. Rowe and Singer each had careers as TV news anchors before and after starting KCRF-FM, Singer at KATU in Portland and both at stations in Los Angeles. Singer returned to Portland TV news at KPTV in 1984, leaving Rowe to operate KCRF-FM; Rowe became an anchor at KREM in Spokane, Washington, in 1987; 20 years later, when he retired from KREM, he recalled his time building and owning KCRF as "the most fun I've ever had ... I'm very proud of that station. I wasn't making a lot of money but I sure was having a lot of fun."

After Rowe moved to Spokane, KCRF-FM was sold to Matrix Media, which paired it with KBCH, Lincoln City's AM station. The stations were knocked off the air after a fire on May 5, 1989, destroyed their studios; the fire was believed to be caused by a lit cigarette. After the fire, Matrix declared bankruptcy, and KBCH-KCRF was acquired by Oceanlake Broadcasting Corporation. Oceanlake agreed to sell the stations to Q Media in 1996 but still owned them in 1999 when a sale was agreed to Yaquina Bay Communications, owner of three stations in Newport.

KCRF-FM, along with its sister stations (KNPT and KNCU in Newport, KBCH in Lincoln City, and KWDP in Waldport), shut down on December 31, 2023. The closure followed the August foreclosure of the stations' Newport studios, which were sold to Oregon Coast Bank in a sheriff's sale on December 5. At the time, KCRF offered a classic rock format. Xana Oregon, owned by Thomas Hodgins and Christopher Jacky, acquired KNCU and KCRF-FM from Yaquina Bay Communications for $115,000 in a sale filed with the FCC in April 2024.

On July 1, 2026, KCRF-FM changed their format from classic rock to country, branded as "K-Surf Country".
