= KWPB-LP =

- Newport, Oregon; United States
- Frequency: 98.7 MHz
- Branding: Winds of Praise

Programming
- Format: Contemporary Christian

Ownership
- Owner: Winds of Praise Broadcasting

Technical information
- Licensing authority: FCC
- Facility ID: 133784
- Class: L1
- ERP: 100 watts
- HAAT: 18.0 meters (59.1 ft)
- Transmitter coordinates: 44°38′57″N 124°3′08″W

Links
- Public license information: LMS
- Webcast: Listen live
- Website: windsofpraise.com

KWPB-LP (98.7 FM, "Winds of Praise") is a low-power radio station broadcasting a contemporary Christian music format. Licensed to Newport, Oregon, United States, the station is currently owned by Winds of Praise Broadcasting.
