= Yaquina Head Light =

Lighthouse in Oregon

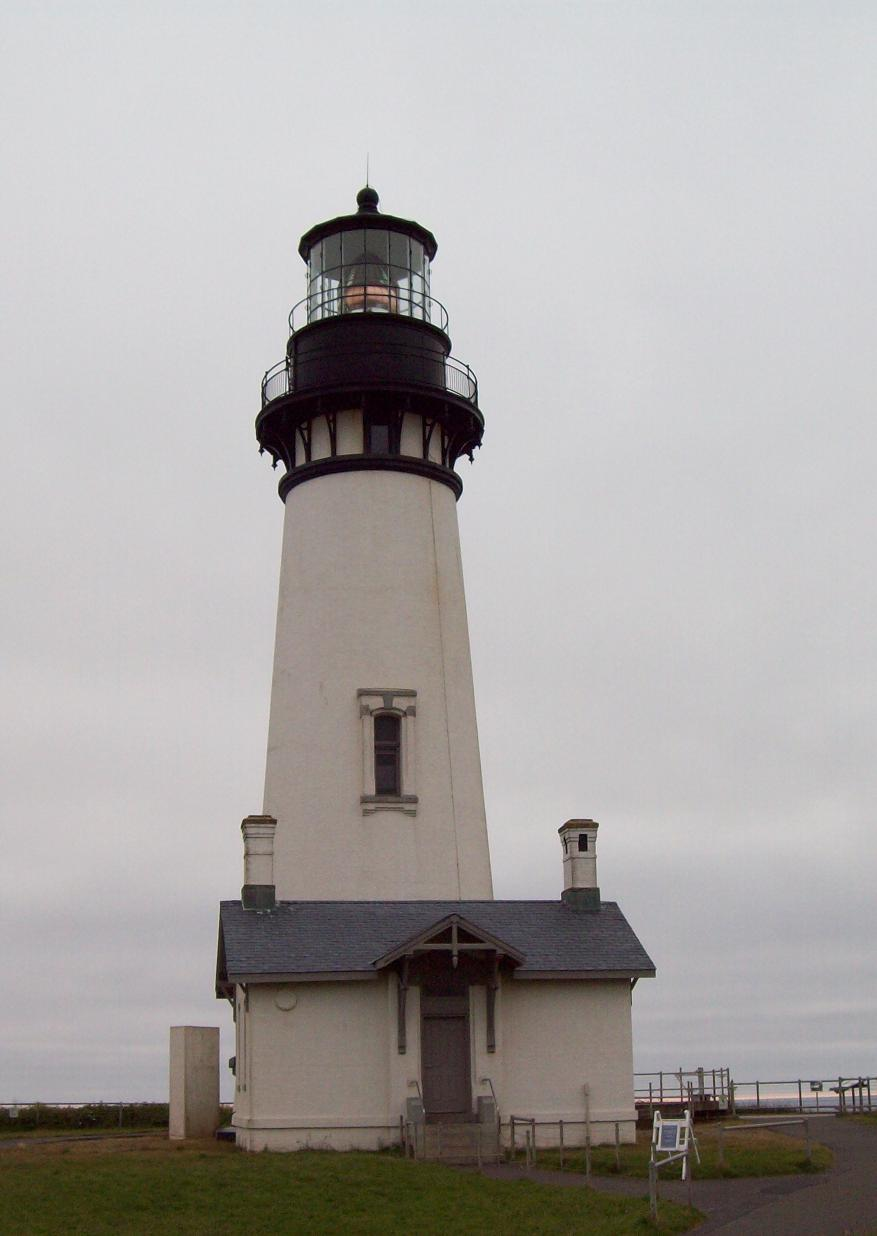
- Yaquina Head Lighthouse in 2010
- Location: Newport, Oregon
- Coordinates: 44°40′36.4″N 124°4′45.9″W

Tower
- Foundation: Brick on basalt rock
- Construction: brick
- Automated: 1966
- Height: 93 feet (28 m), 114 steps
- Shape: Conical
- Heritage: National Register of Historic Places listed place

Light
- First lit: 1873
- Deactivated: Active
- Focal height: 49 m (161 ft)
- Lens: First order Fixed Fresnel lens. Lard Oil 1873 - 1887, Kerosene 1887 - ?, Vapor Oil ? - 1933, Electrified 1933-1939 with a solid white light (1 kW Halogen Bulb made by GE), 1939- 500 watt bulb blinking in pattern. Retrofitted with LED in January 2019.
- Range: 18.5 nautical miles (34.3 km; 21.3 mi)
- Characteristic: Originally Solid White (non-rotating). After 1939: 2 seconds on, 2 seconds off, 2 seconds on, 14 seconds off
- Yaquina Head Lighthouse
- U.S. National Register of Historic Places
- Nearest city: Newport, Oregon
- Area: 4.6 acres (1.9 ha)
- MPS: Lighthouse Stations of Oregon MPS
- NRHP reference No.: 73002340
- Added to NRHP: May 13, 1993

The Yaquina Head Light, also known early in its existence as the Cape Foulweather Lighthouse (Cape Foul Weather is 4 miles (6.4 km) to the north) is a lighthouse on the Oregon Coast of the United States, established in 1873. It is located in Lincoln County, near Newport at Yaquina Head. The tower stands 93 feet (28 m) tall, and is the tallest lighthouse in Oregon.

== History ==
Made in Paris in 1868 and shipped to Oregon, Yaquina Head Light was first lit August 20, 1873, and automated in 1966. It is active with an identifying light characteristic of two seconds on, two seconds off, two seconds on, and 14 seconds off.

A two-story keepers' dwelling was built at the time the lighthouse tower and its adjoining oil house were constructed. In 1923, a one-story keepers' house was added a short distance to the east. In 1938, a one-story building replaced the original two-story dwelling. Both dwellings and all outbuildings (a shed, a garage, etc.) were then demolished in 1984.

Yaquina Head typically had three lighthouse keepers under the U.S. Lighthouse Service; a Head Keeper, and First and Second Assistant. The Head Keeper as well as the First Assistant usually stayed in the two-story keepers' dwelling with their families and the Second Assistant was usually a bachelor. In 1939 the U.S. Coast Guard took over the management. During World War II, 17 servicemen were stationed at Yaquina Head to keep a lookout for enemy ships.

The lighthouse still uses its original 1868 French-made, 1st order, Fixed Fresnel lens, visible 19 miles (31 km) out to sea. In 1993, the lighthouse was listed in the National Register of Historic Places (reference number #73002340).

== Description ==
The 100-acre (40 ha) site was established by Congress as an Outstanding Natural Area in 1980. The Bureau of Land Management manages the Yaquina Head Outstanding Natural Area, including the lighthouse. The Yaquina Head Interpretive Center opened in 1997 and includes exhibits about the history and preservation of the lighthouse, as well as the marine life found in tide pools and along the coast. The Center includes a gift shop.

The lighthouse lantern is operated by the U.S. Coast Guard and the U.S. Fish and Wildlife Service monitors offshore bird rookeries and wildlife. The Oregon Department of Fish and Wildlife manages the intertidal animals, and the Oregon Department of State Lands is responsible for the intertidal lands.

Lighthouse tours are available. Space on these tours is limited and available on a first-come, first-served basis at the Interpretive Center desk.

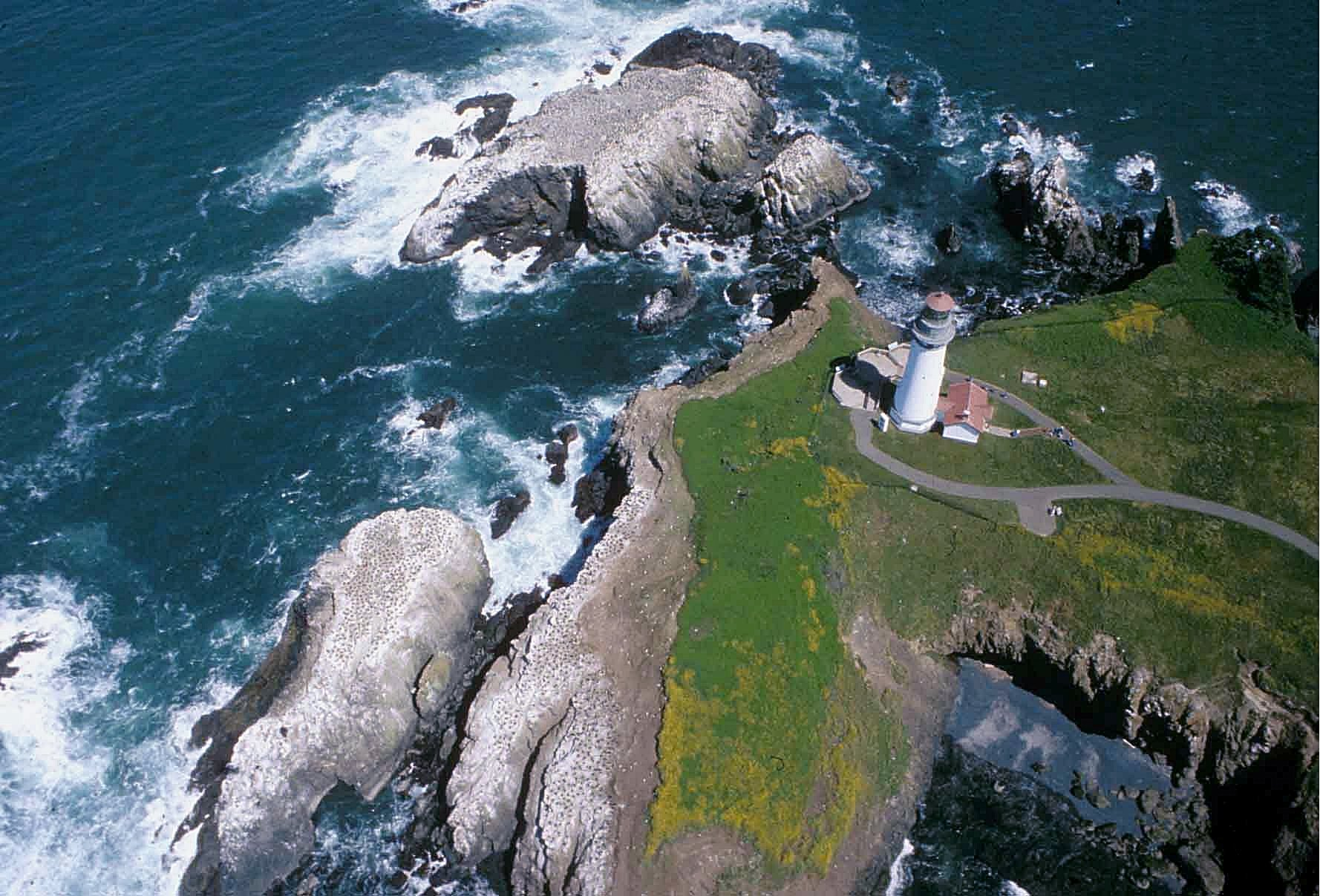
Aerial view

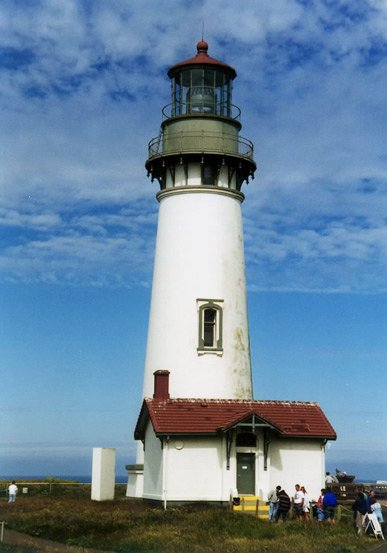
Yaquina Head Lighthouse in 2004.

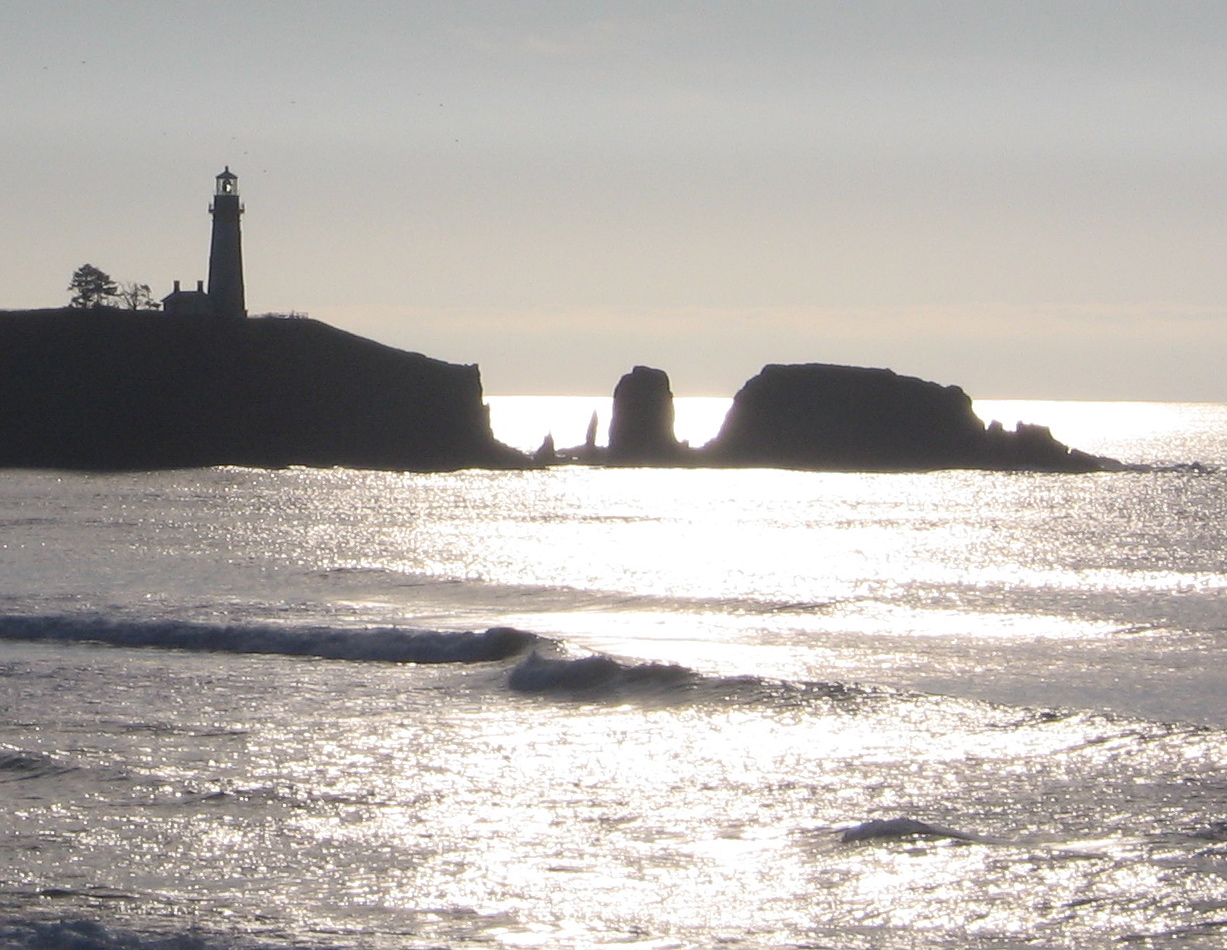
Yaquina Head from the north

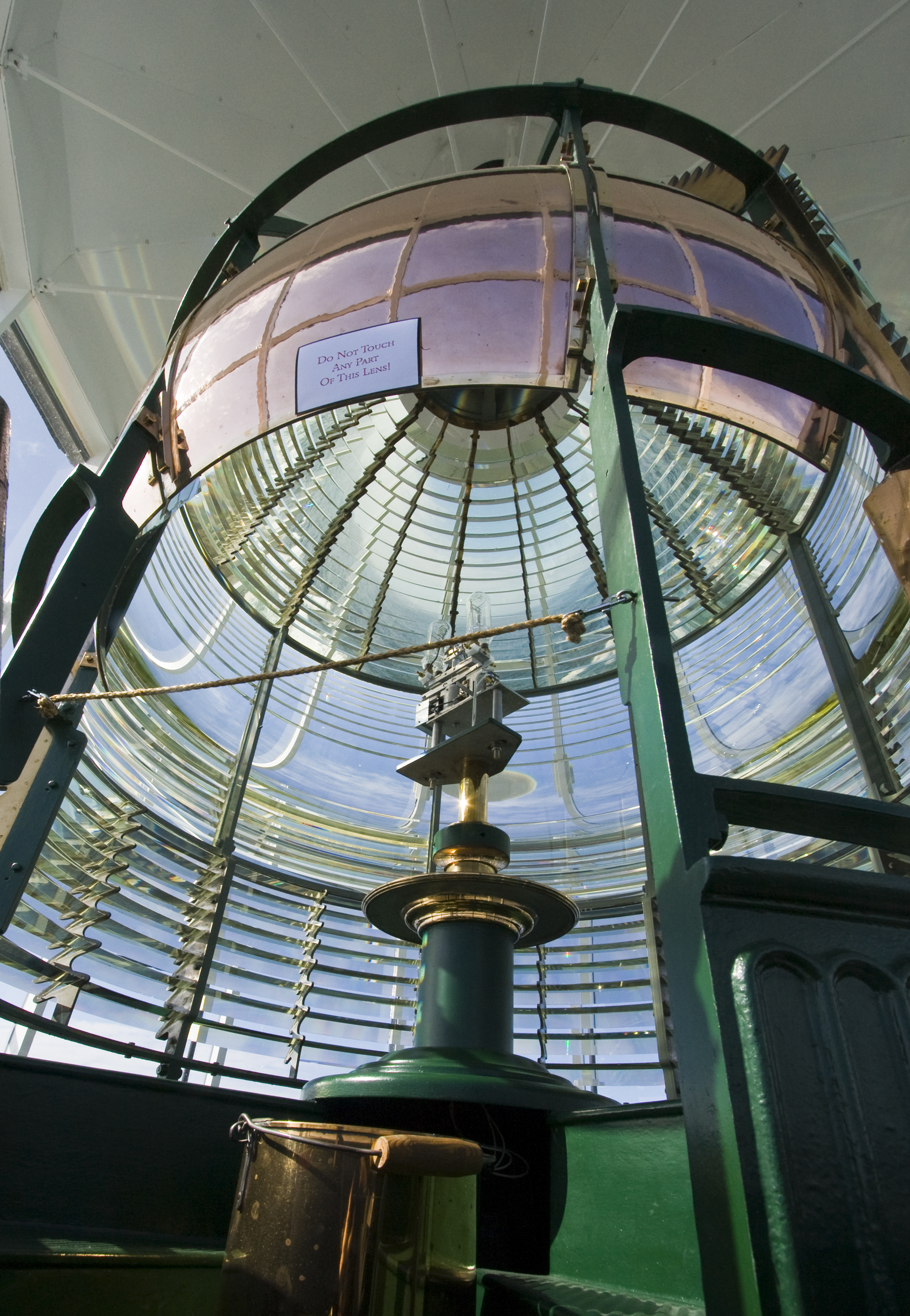
First-order Fresnel lens

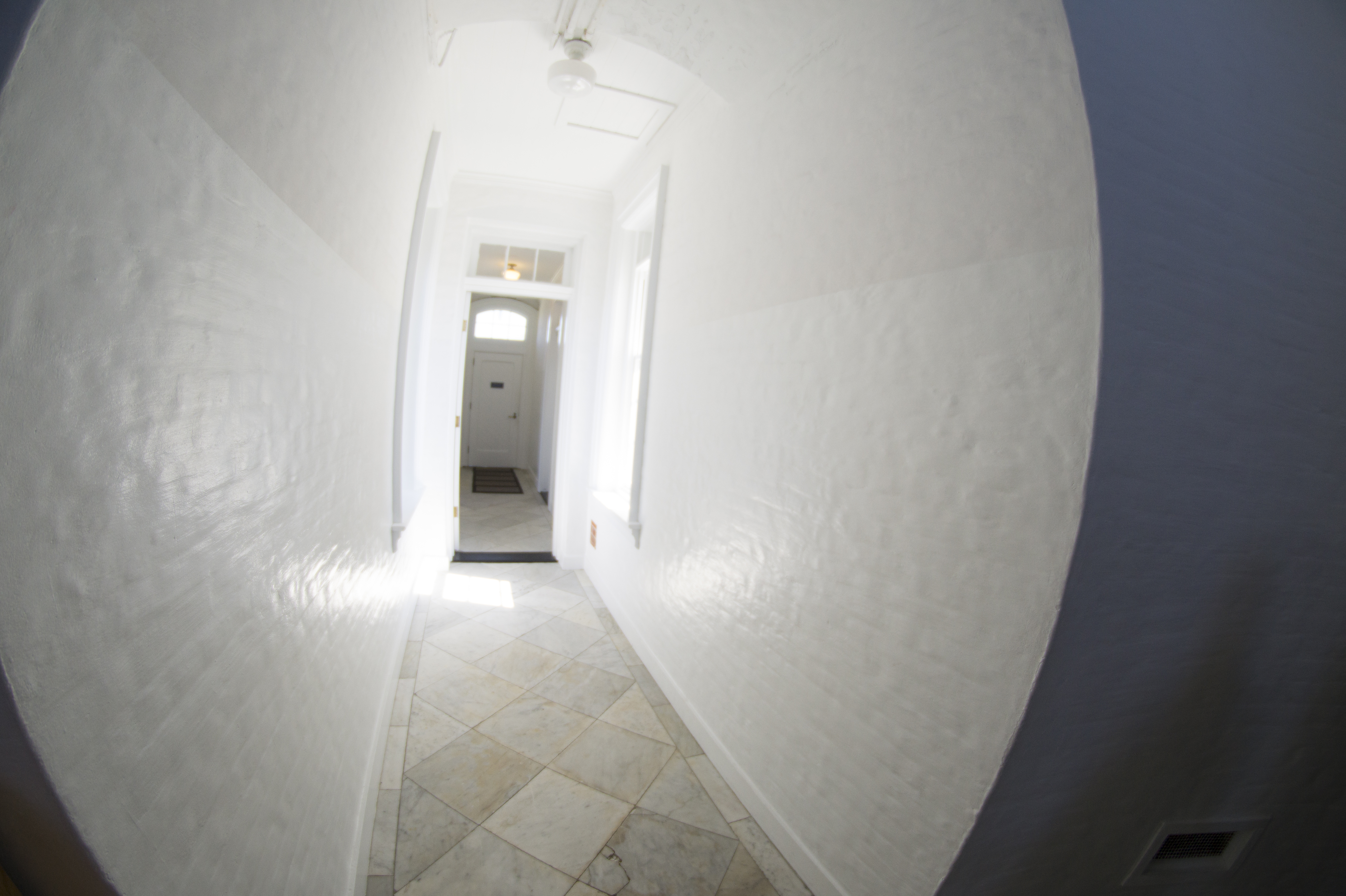
Interior view showing the building's iconic marble floor.

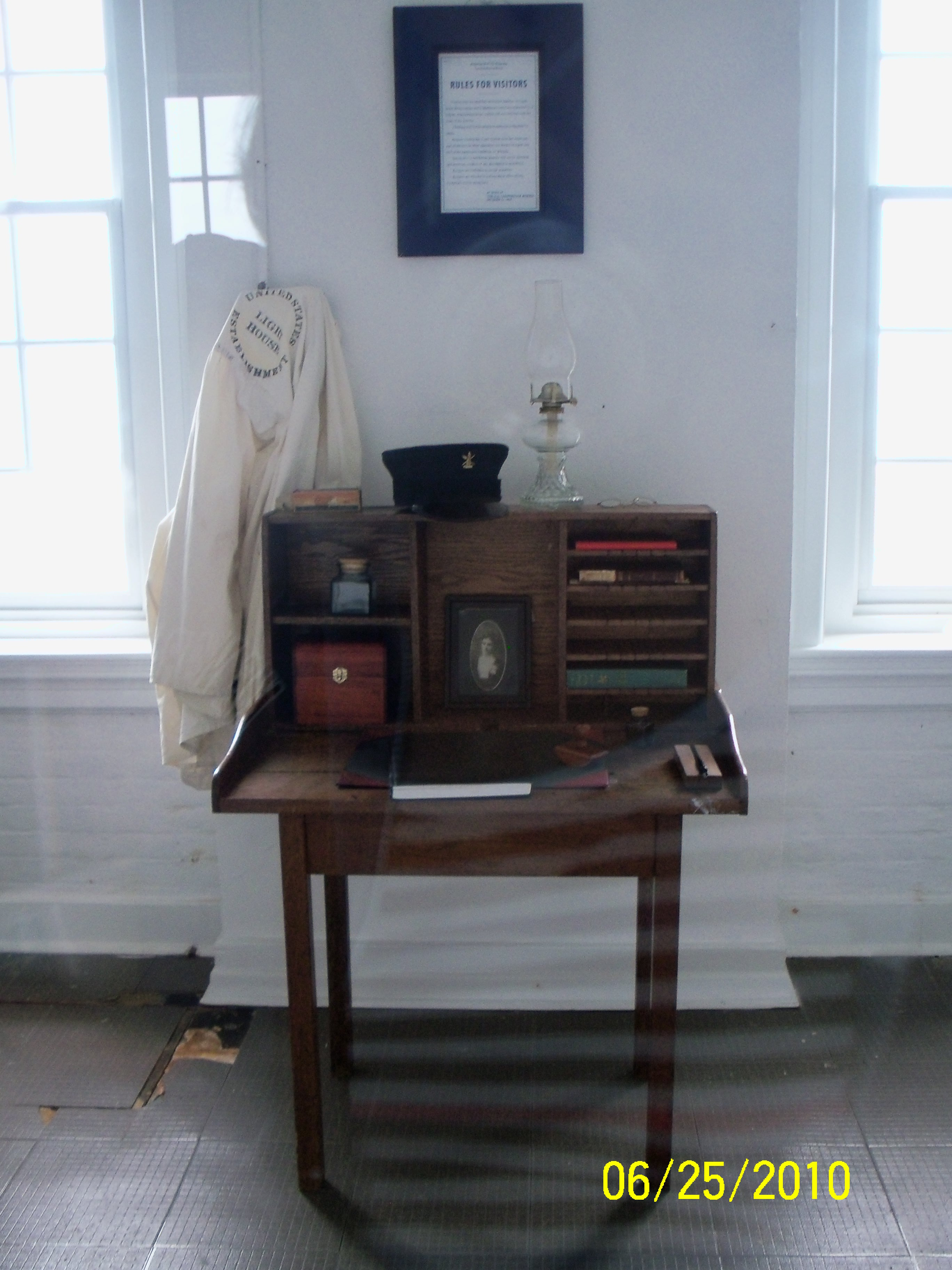
USLHS equipment inside the lighthouse.

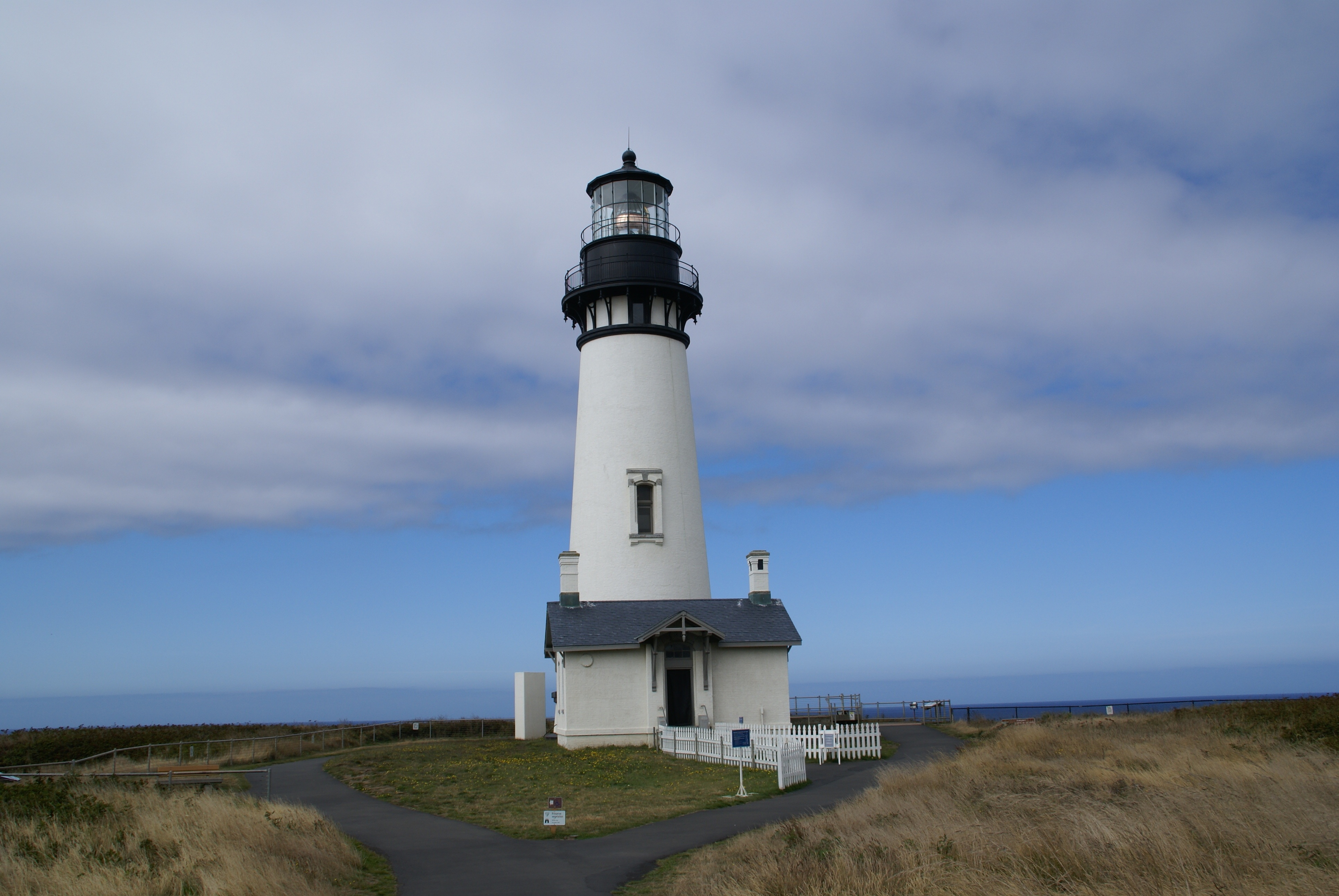
The lighthouse in 2007

== Film and television location ==
The lighthouse was used as the setting for the "Moesko Island Lighthouse" in the 2002 film The Ring. It had already appeared in an earlier film, Hysterical (1983), and The Nancy Drew Mysteries 1977 television series episode "The Mystery of Pirate's Cove".

== See also ==
- List of lighthouses on the Oregon Coast
