= New Cliff House =

- U.S. National Register of Historic Places
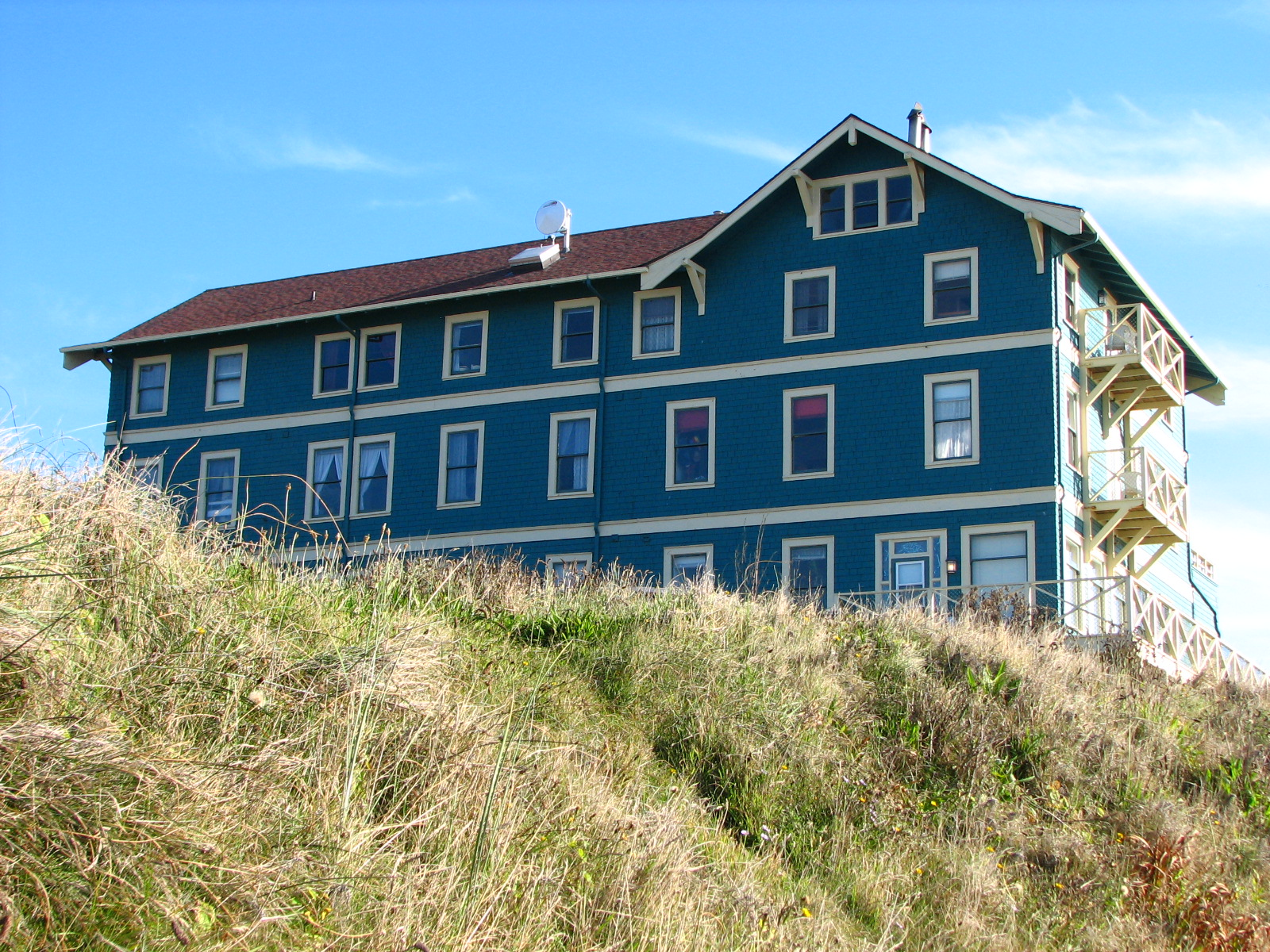
- The New Cliff House in 2008

- Location within Oregon Location within the United States
- Location: 267 NW Cliff Street; Newport, Oregon
- Coordinates: 44°38′18″N 124°03′44″W
- Area: Less than 1 acre (0.40 ha)
- Built: 1913
- Architectural style: Craftsman
- NRHP reference No.: 86002962
- Added to NRHP: November 6, 1986

New Cliff House, also formerly known as the Hotel Gilmore and now known as the Sylvia Beach Hotel, is a historic hotel building in Newport, Oregon.

== History ==
The hotel was built in 1913 for W. D. Wheeler and was promoted by the Southern Pacific Railroad in its literature advertising the connection of Yaquina Bay to the mail rail line at Corvallis. The New Cliff House replaced an earlier boarding house (the "Cliff House") at the same location. The popularity of the new resort at Newport was enhanced by the availability of alcohol, something unusual in the mostly "dry" area. The hotel overlooks Nye Beach, and is the only remnant of the tourist accommodations of that era in the Nye Beach section of Newport.

== Description ==
As built, the New Cliff House had its kitchen and service areas in the basement, with a dining room at the end of that level overlooking the ocean. The lobby is on the main level, with some sleeping rooms. Parlor rooms and sleeping rooms occupied the second and third floors.

The building is L-shaped with a gabled roof, measuring about 80 feet (24 m) by 30 feet (9.1 m), with a 10-foot (3.0 m) by 27-foot (8.2 m) extension. It is built in wood frame and covered in wood shingles, set on a concrete and stone foundation. The elevations feature simple double-hung sash windows, regularly spaced.

The hotel is relatively unaltered, with most changes on the lower level. Individual room arrangements have been changed to provide private toilets for the rooms. A moderate proportion of the original trim remains.

== Present Sylvia Beach House ==
New Cliff House was placed on the National Register of Historic Places on November 6, 1986 by an application from Aron Faegre Architect. It is operated as the Sylvia Beach Hotel, named for Sylvia Beach, opening under that name on the hundredth anniversary of the birth of Sylvia Beach, March 14, 1987. It was the creation of Goody Cable and Sally Ford as owners, and Aron Faegre as architect. Aron Faegre, the architect, remembers that Goody Cable's dream was that there would be a library in the upper reaches of the renovated hotel, and at night the seats would be full of people with books, but the books would be turned over the people would be talking with each other (personal memory) The present hotel, in keeping with its name, has a literary theme, with each guest room dedicated to a well-known author and decorated to reflect the author's life and work.

== See also ==
- National Register of Historic Places listings in Lincoln County, Oregon
