= Agate Beach State Recreation Site =

State Recreation Site in Oregon, United States

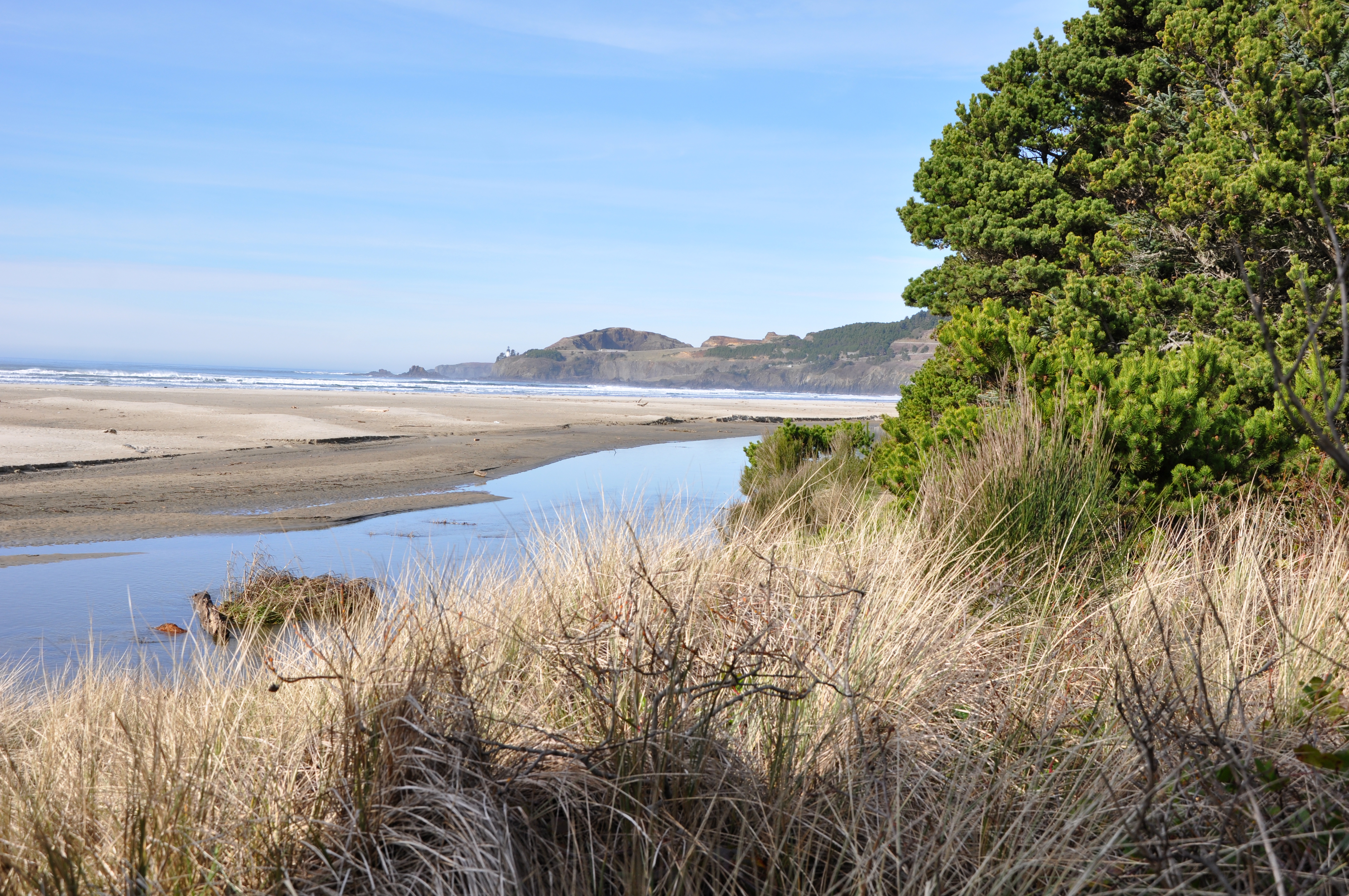
- Along a path leading to the beach

- Location within Oregon Location within the United States
- Interactive map of Agate Beach State Recreation Site
- Type: Public, state
- Location: Lincoln County, Oregon
- Nearest city: Newport, Oregon, United States
- Coordinates: 44°39′31″N 124°03′29″W
- Area: 18.48 acres (7.48 ha)
- Elevation: 16 feet (5 m)
- Created: 1969
- Operator: Oregon Parks and Recreation Department
- Visitors: about 190,000 a year
- Open: Year-round

Agate Beach State Recreation Site is a state park between Newport and Agate Beach in Lincoln County in the U.S. state of Oregon. It is administered by the Oregon Parks and Recreation Department.

Lying between new and old U.S. Highway 101, the 18.48-acre (7.48 ha) park offers beach access via a path from the parking lot through a tunnel under the old highway. Amenities include restrooms and a place to fish, surf, and dig for razor clams. The site also has picnic tables, and activities on its beach may include kite flying, agate hunting, birdwatching, and photography.

Created in 1969 from land bought from the Lincoln County Development Company, the park is open year-round. About 190,000 people visit the park each year.

== See also ==
- List of Oregon state parks
