= KNCU =

- Newport, Oregon; United States
- Broadcast area: Central Oregon Coast
- Frequency: 92.7 MHz
- Branding: Fox Sports Newport

Programming
- Format: Sports talk
- Affiliations: Fox Sports Radio

Ownership
- Owner: Stephen Woodward (KORE Broadcasting)
- Sister stations: KCRF-FM

History
- First air date: June 2000
- Former call signs: KBGX (1998–2000)

Technical information
- Licensing authority: FCC
- Facility ID: 81725
- Class: C3
- ERP: 3,800 watts
- HAAT: 256 meters (840 ft)
- Transmitter coordinates: 44°45′22″N 124°02′57″W

Links
- Public license information: Public file; LMS
- Website: foxsportsnewport.com

KNCU (92.7 FM, "Fox Sports Newport") is a radio station licensed to serve Newport, Oregon, United States. The station is owned by KORE Broadcasting.

== History ==
This station received its original construction permit from the Federal Communications Commission on April 16, 1998. The new station was assigned the KBGX call sign by the FCC on July 17, 1998. KBGX received its license to cover from the FCC on May 30, 2000, and signed on that June with country music supplied by Westwood One. The station initially applied for new call letters KNUU, and was assigned KNCU by the FCC on August 30, 2000.

In October 2000, Yaquina Bay Communications, Inc., reached an agreement to sell this station to Pacific West Broadcasting, Inc. The deal was approved by the FCC on October 27, 2000, and the transaction was consummated on November 15, 2000.

KNCU, along with its sister stations (KNPT in Newport, KBCH and KCRF-FM in Lincoln City, and KWDP in Waldport), shut down on December 31, 2023. The closure followed the August foreclosure of the stations' studios, which were sold to Oregon Coast Bank in a sheriff's sale on December 5.

Previous logo

On June 27, 2025, KNCU flipped to sports under the branding "Fox Sports Newport".

== Programming ==
KNCU broadcasts a sports talk format with some programming provided by Fox Sports Radio.
