= Jump-off Joe =

Former rock pillar on Oregon's coast

Coordinates: 44.645395°N 124.062617°W

Jump-off Joe in 1890

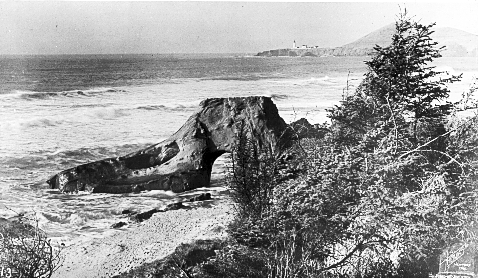
Jump-off Joe in 1910.

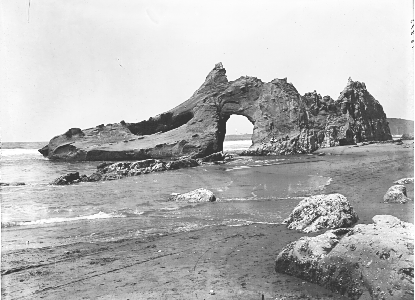
Jump-off Joe in the 1910s just prior to the arch's collapse in 1916.

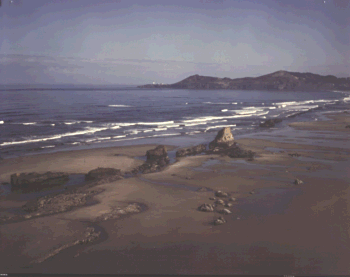
Jump-off Joe in 1970.

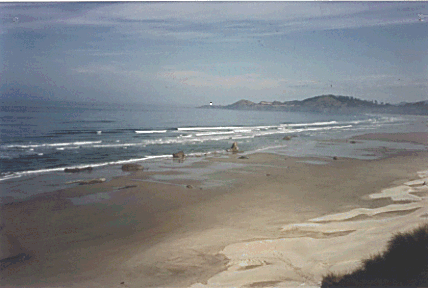
Jump-off Joe in 1990.

Jump-off Joe was a 100-foot-tall sea stack geological formation composed of middle Miocene concretionary sandstone at Nye Beach in Newport, Oregon, United States. It was a well-known tourist attraction before World War I. It formed sometime before the 1880s when it was connected to the mainland, and was a major impediment walking the beach. Early travelers would have to jump off the side to get over it, hence the name. Early writers claimed the site was connected with Native American mythology. Natural forces separated it from the mainland in the 1890s, and its large arch collapsed in 1916.

== Etymology ==
The name "Jump-Off Joe" originated from the son of Dr. John McLoughlin, Joseph. Joseph accidentally fell near the rock during a trapping expedition but managed to survive for nine more years before dying of his injuries. The rock was originally known as "The Jump-Off Where Joe Fell", before being shortened to "Jump-Off Joe".

== Key events ==
- Between 1920 and 1970, the majority of the sea stack collapsed, and by 1990 it had been swept away, and little trace remains today.
- In 1970 and 1990, members of the United States Geological Survey photographed the remains of the sea-stack.
- In late January 2021, Jump-Off Joe was affected by a landslide and closed it off to the public due to safety risks.
