= Yaquina Head =

Headland, north of Newport, Oregon, USA

Yaquina Head Outstanding Natural Area
- IUCN category V (protected landscape/seascape)
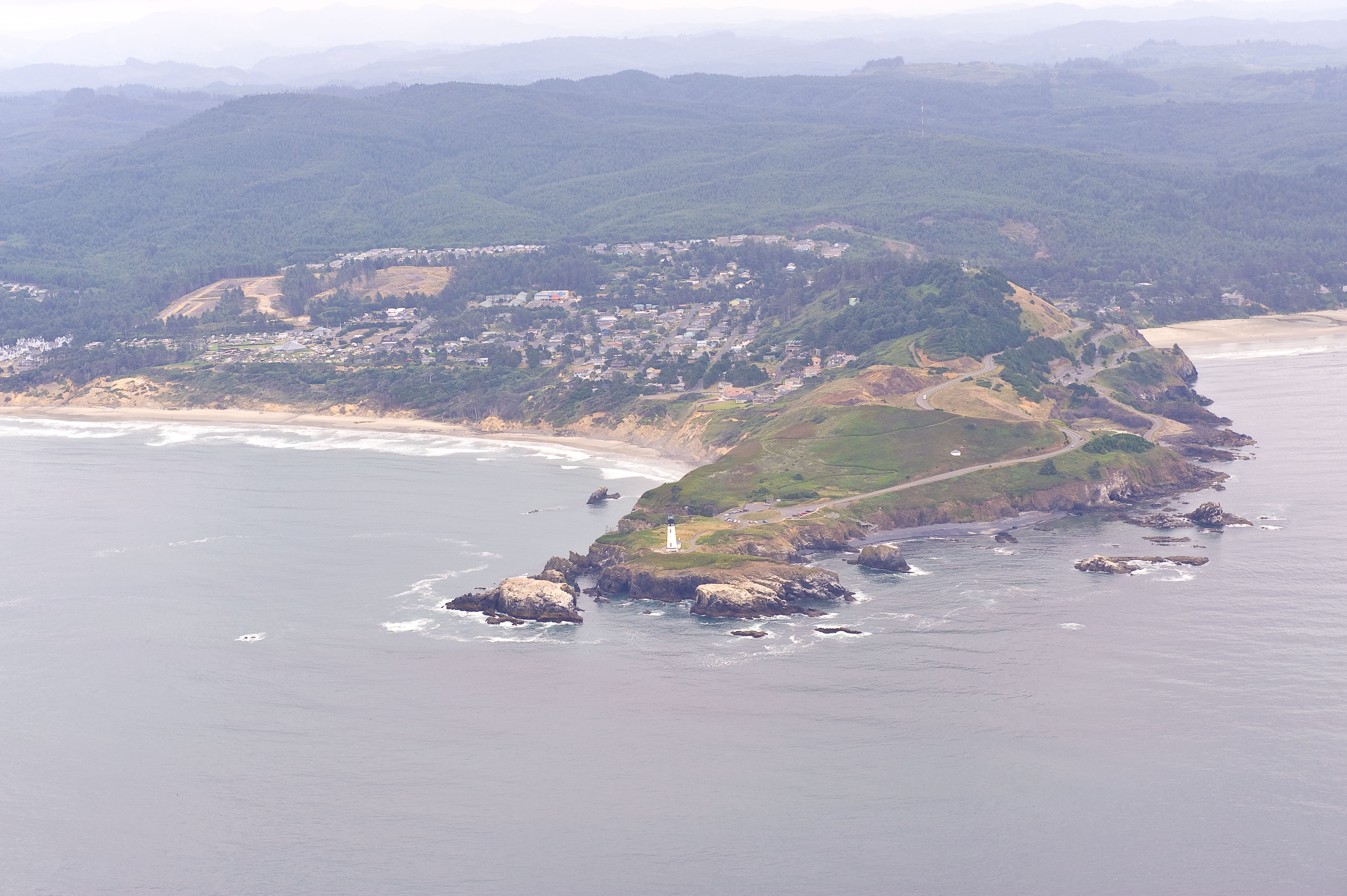
- Aerial view of Yaquina Head

- Location within the United States
- Location: Lincoln County, Oregon, United States
- Nearest city: Newport, Oregon
- Coordinates: 44°40′30″N 124°04′35″W
- Area: 95 acres (38 ha)
- Established: 1980
- Governing body: Bureau of Land Management

Yaquina Head (/jəˈkwɪnə/ yə-KWIN-ə) is a headland extending into the Pacific Ocean north of Newport, in the U.S. state of Oregon. It is the site of the Yaquina Head Light, and is managed as Yaquina Head Outstanding Natural Area by the Bureau of Land Management. It is part of the National Landscape Conservation System, commonly known as the National Conservation Lands.

The United States Congress named the 95-acre (38 ha) headland an Outstanding Natural Area in 1980. The area's average elevation is 108 feet (33 m) above sea level. The headland is along U.S. Route 101, and is about 55 miles (89 km) west of Corvallis.

Possible activities include hiking the area's five trails, each shorter than 0.5 miles (0.8 km), near the ocean or through forests of Douglas fir and Sitka spruce. Other attractions include whale-watching, bird-watching, visiting the site's interpretive center, and touring the lighthouse.

Ancient lava flows formed Yaquina Head.

== Gallery ==
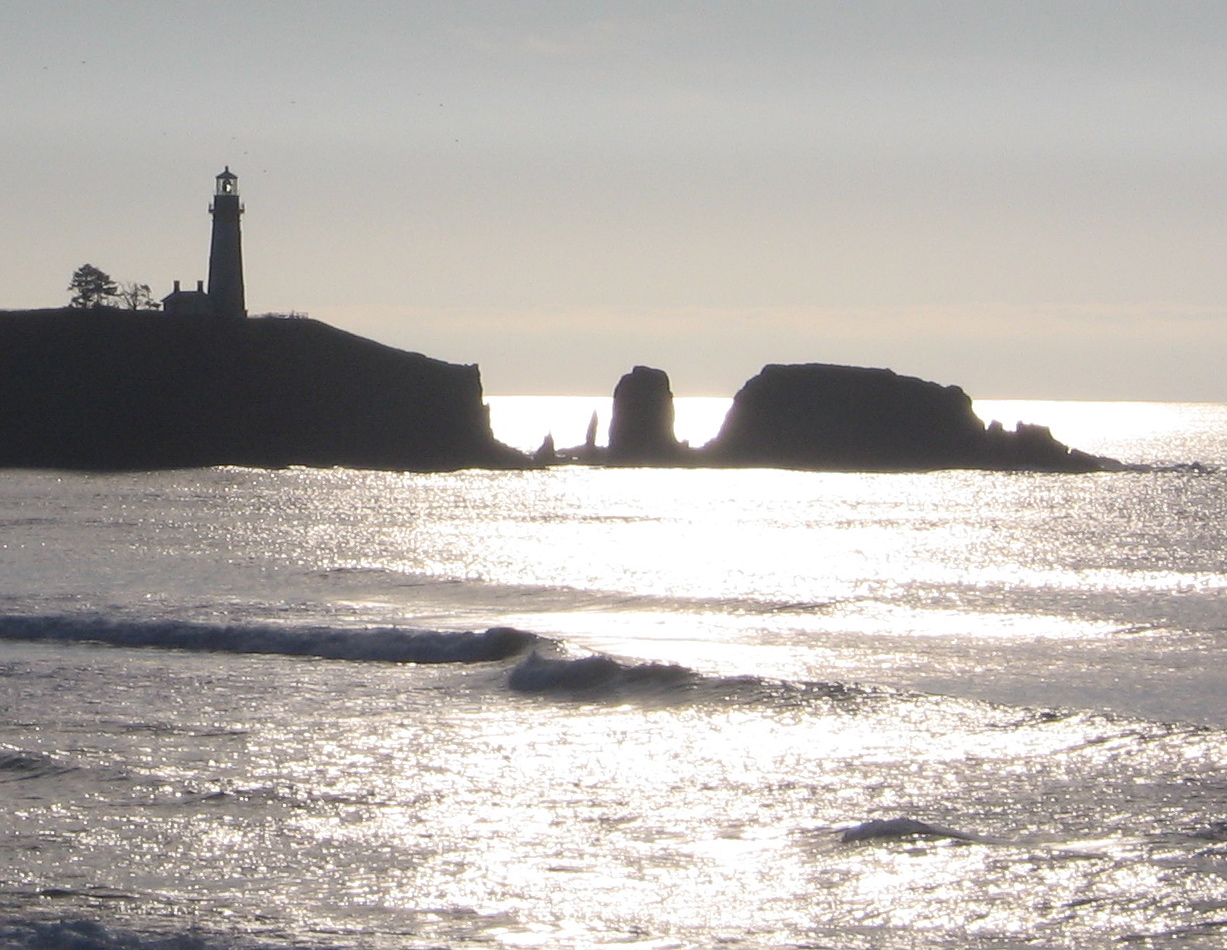
Yaquina Head from the north.

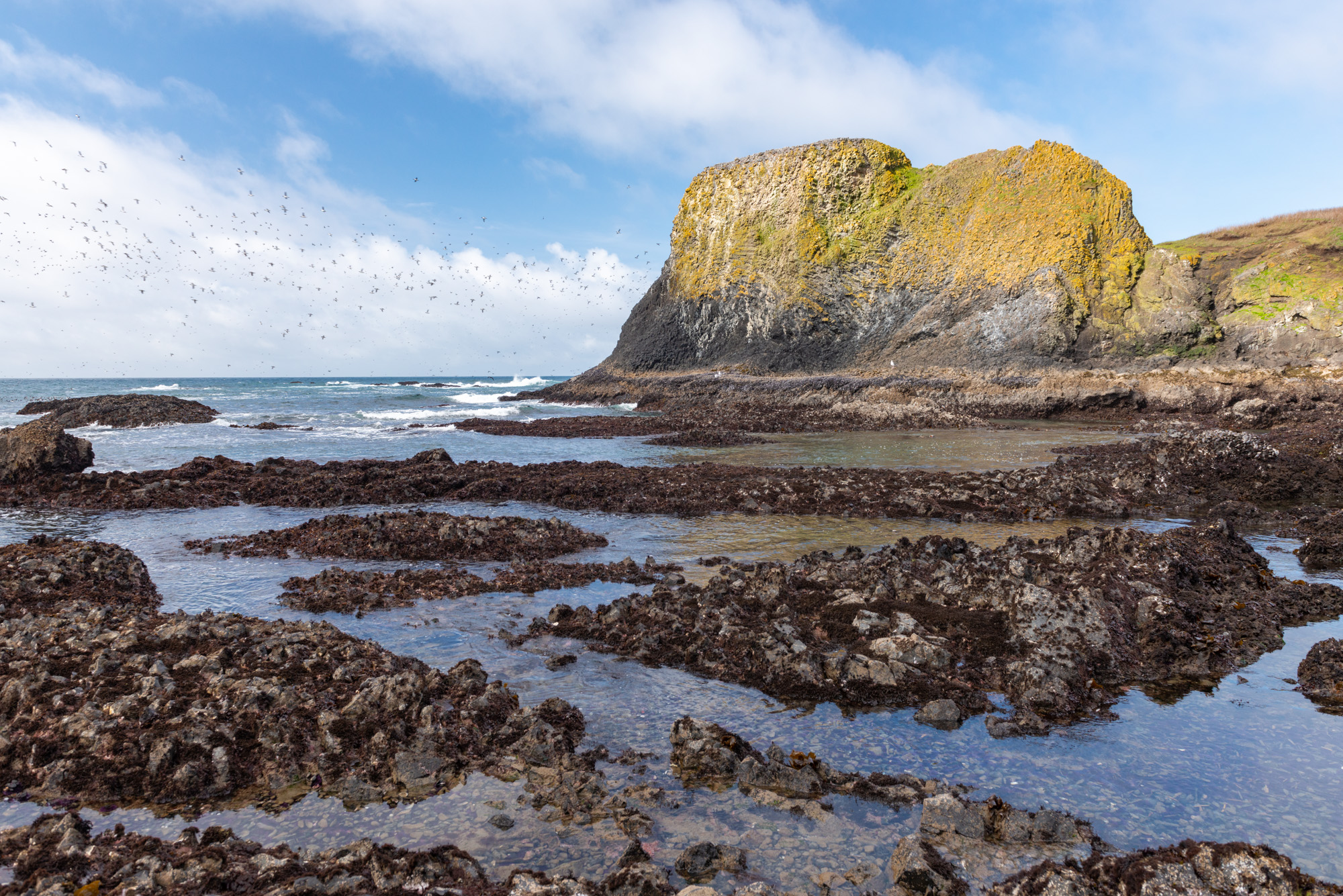
Rocks at Yaquina Head, with tidepools.

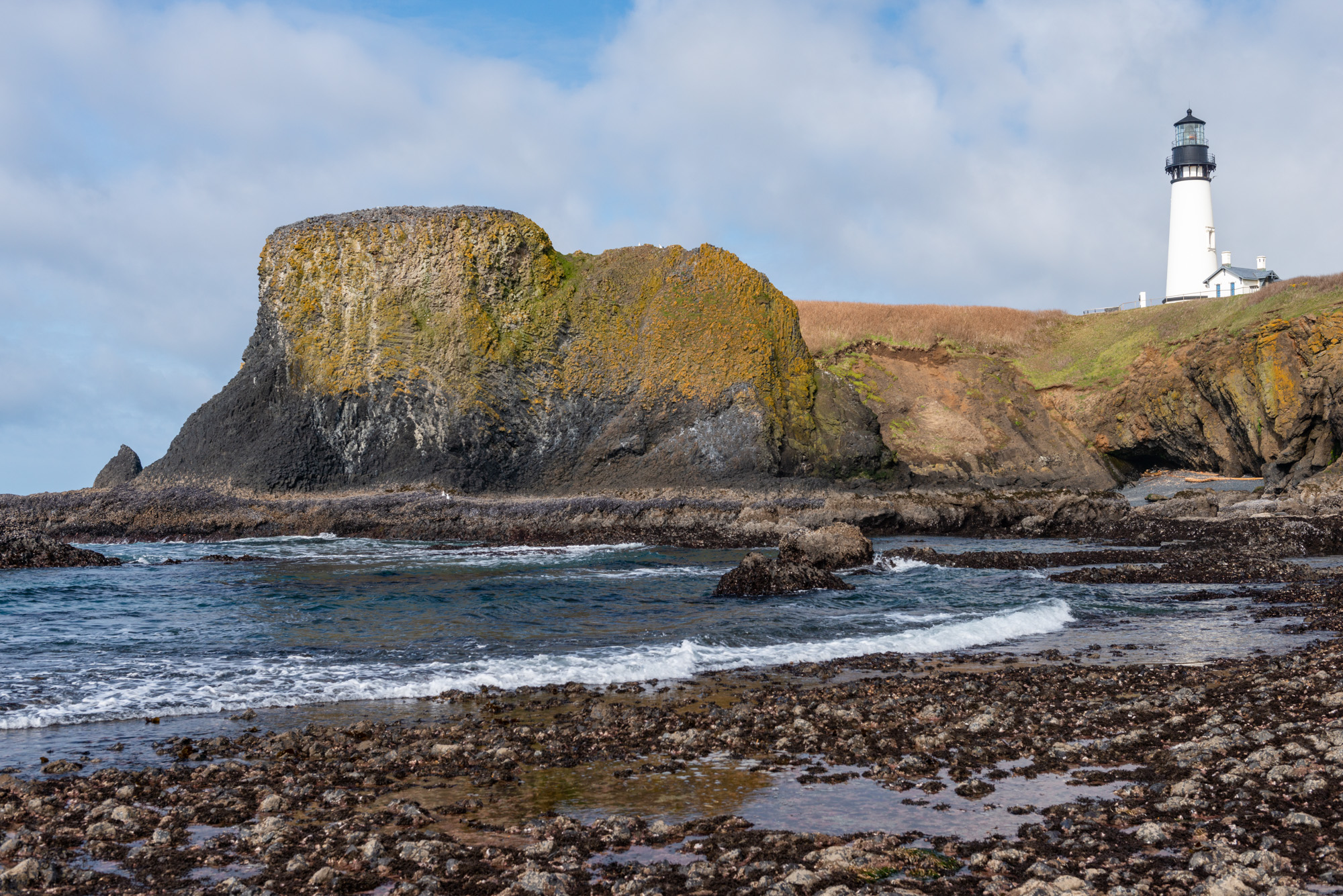
Yaquina Head, with lighthouse.

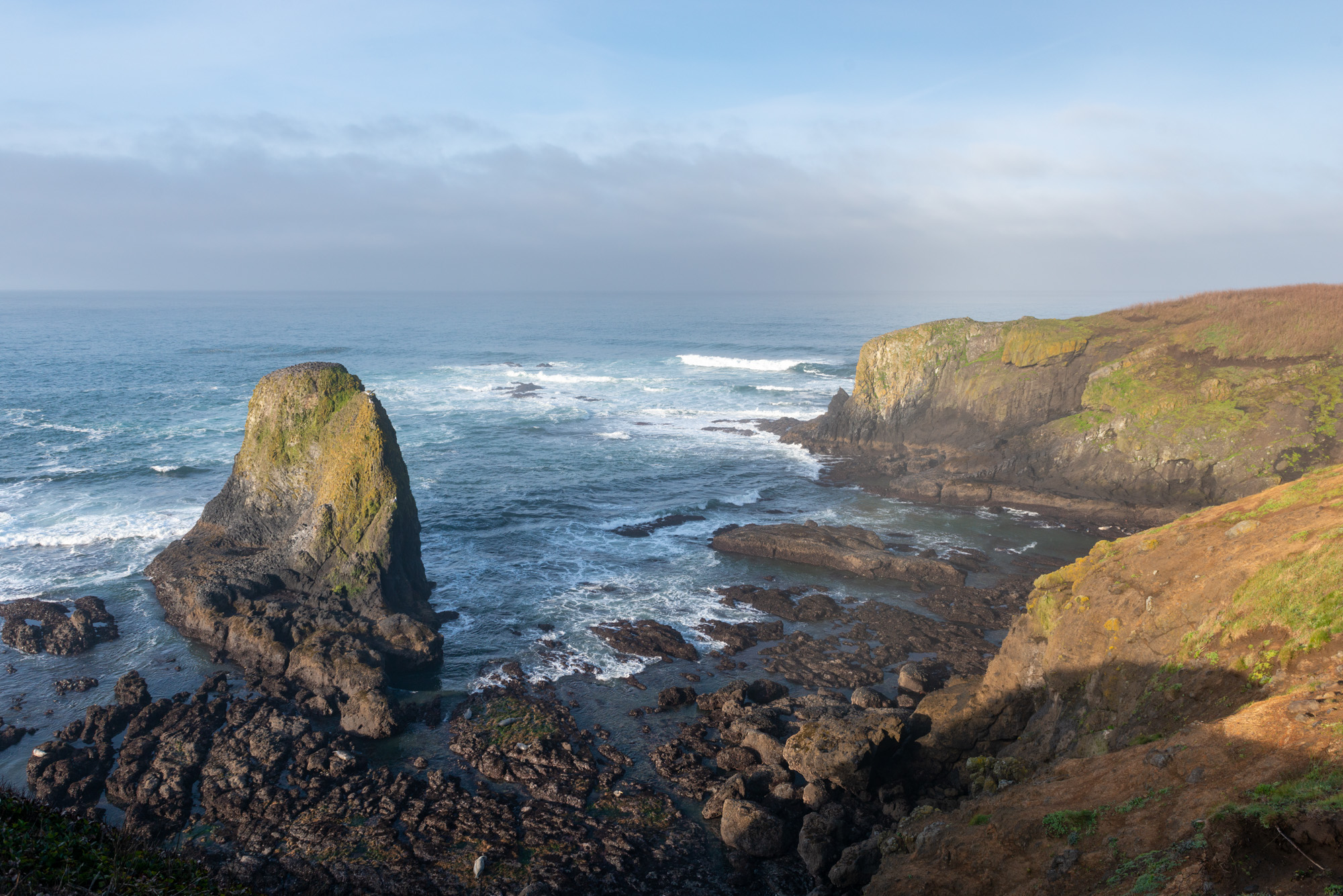
Rocks and shoreline at Yaquina Head.

== See also ==
- Oregon Coast
- Yaquina Head Light
- Yaquina River
