= Newport, Oregon =

City in Lincoln County, Oregon

- City
- City of Newport
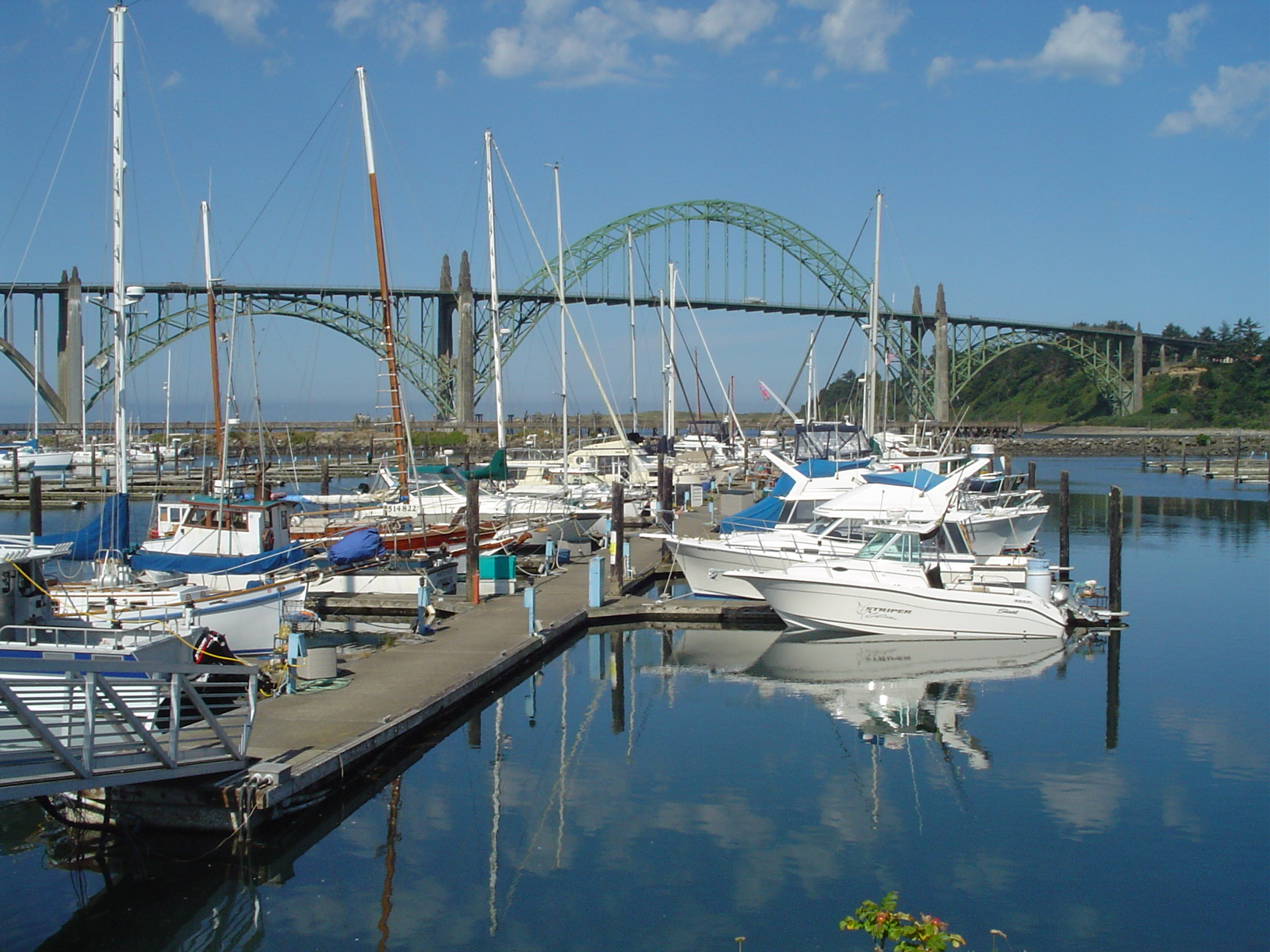
- Port of Newport and Yaquina Bay Bridge (U.S. Route 101)
- Motto: "The Friendliest"
- Location of Newport in Lincoln County, Oregon (left) and in Oregon (right)
- Coordinates: 44°38′18″N 124°03′05″W
- Country: United States
- State: Oregon
- County: Lincoln
- Incorporated: 1882

Government
  - Mayor: Jan Kaplan

Area
  - Total: 11.72 sq mi (30.35 km^{2})
  - Land: 9.98 sq mi (25.84 km^{2})
  - Water: 1.75 sq mi (4.52 km^{2})
- Elevation: 0 ft (0 m)

Population (2020)
  - Total: 10,256
  - Density: 1,028.1/sq mi (396.96/km^{2})
- Time zone: UTC-8 (PST)
  - Summer (DST): UTC-7 (PDT)
- ZIP Codes: 97365-97366
- Area code: 541
- FIPS code: 41-52450
- GNIS feature ID: 2411248
- Website: City of Newport

Newport, earlier known as Fredericksberg, is a city in and the county seat of Lincoln County, Oregon, United States. It was incorporated in 1882 with the name dating back to the establishment of a post office in 1868. Newport was named for Newport, Rhode Island. As of the 2020 census, the city had a total population of 10,256.

It is also home of the Oregon Coast Aquarium, Hatfield Marine Science Center, Nye Beach, Yaquina Head Light, Yaquina Bay Light, Newport Sea Lion Docks, Pacific Maritime Heritage Center, and the former Rogue Ales. The city is the western terminus of U.S. Route 20, a cross-country highway that originates in Boston and is the longest road in the United States.

== History ==
The area was originally home to the Yacona tribe, whose history can be traced back at least 3000 years. White settlers began homesteading the area in 1864. The town was named by Sam Case, who also became the first postmaster.

Newport has been the county seat of Lincoln County since 1952, when voters approved a measure to move the center of government from nearby Toledo to Newport.

== Geography ==
According to the U.S. Census Bureau, the city has a total area of 10.59 square miles (27.43 km^{2}), of which 9.05 square miles (23.44 km^{2}) is land and 1.54 square miles (3.99 km^{2}) is water. It is located 3,365 miles (5,415.44 km^{2}) west of Boston, Massachusetts on road signs for US-20.

=== Climate ===
Newport has mild, wet weather throughout the year with the heaviest precipitation falling during the winter months. The city averages 29 mornings with minimum temperatures of 32 °F or 0 °C or lower, whilst only four afternoons have exceeded 90 °F (32.2 °C) on record. Historic extreme temperatures have varied between 6 °F (−14.4 °C) on December 8, 1972, and again on December 21, 1990, up to 94 °F (34.4 °C) on October 2, 1980.

The average annual precipitation between 1961 and 1990 was 70.99 inches (1,803 mm), with the wettest period being from July 1968 to June 1969 with 102.15 inches (2,594.6 mm) and the driest, like most of Oregon, from July 1976 to June 1977 with 38.94 inches (989.1 mm). There are an average of 187 days a year with precipitation equalling or exceeding 0.01 inches or 0.3 millimetres. Average annual snowfall is only 1.57 inches or 0.040 meters.

In October 1962, wind gusts at Newport reached 138 miles per hour (222 km/h; 120 kn) before the wind gauge stopped working. This occurred during the Columbus Day Windstorm, which the National Weather Service has named one of Oregon's top 10 weather events of the 20th century.

Another top-10 event affecting Newport occurred in December 1964, when a rainstorm caused severe flooding in many parts of the state. The Weather Service rated the storm among the most severe in western Oregon since the 1870s. About 21 inches (530 mm) of rain fell on Newport. This was almost twice the normal amount expected in December and set a new record for the city.

Also in the Weather Bureau's top-10 list for Oregon are the snowstorms of January 1950. Newport saw a total of about 6 inches or 0.15 meters fall during the month, four times its normal annual snowfall.

Climate data for Newport, Oregon (1991–2020 normals, extremes 1893–2012)
Month	Jan	Feb	Mar	Apr	May	Jun	Jul	Aug	Sep	Oct	Nov	Dec	Year
Record high °F (°C)	77 (25)	77 (25)	80 (27)	81 (27)	82 (28)	90 (32)	84 (29)	88 (31)	91 (33)	94 (34)	85 (29)	73 (23)	94 (34)
Mean maximum °F (°C)	60.7 (15.9)	64.6 (18.1)	65.2 (18.4)	65.8 (18.8)	69.7 (20.9)	68.7 (20.4)	70.0 (21.1)	71.8 (22.1)	76.8 (24.9)	74.9 (23.8)	64.5 (18.1)	59.8 (15.4)	80.5 (26.9)
Mean daily maximum °F (°C)	50.3 (10.2)	51.6 (10.9)	52.8 (11.6)	54.3 (12.4)	58.1 (14.5)	61.2 (16.2)	63.5 (17.5)	64.1 (17.8)	63.6 (17.6)	59.6 (15.3)	53.7 (12.1)	50.3 (10.2)	64.1 (17.8)
Daily mean °F (°C)	44.8 (7.1)	45.4 (7.4)	46.0 (7.8)	47.8 (8.8)	52.0 (11.1)	55.0 (12.8)	57.4 (14.1)	58.2 (14.6)	56.3 (13.5)	52.4 (11.3)	47.7 (8.7)	44.8 (7.1)	50.6 (10.3)
Mean daily minimum °F (°C)	39.3 (4.1)	39.2 (4.0)	39.2 (4.0)	41.2 (5.1)	45.9 (7.7)	48.8 (9.3)	51.2 (10.7)	52.2 (11.2)	48.9 (9.4)	45.1 (7.3)	41.7 (5.4)	39.2 (4.0)	39.2 (4.0)
Mean minimum °F (°C)	29.6 (−1.3)	29.5 (−1.4)	31.9 (−0.1)	34.3 (1.3)	38.6 (3.7)	43.9 (6.6)	46.0 (7.8)	46.7 (8.2)	43.0 (6.1)	37.4 (3.0)	32.6 (0.3)	29.6 (−1.3)	25.1 (−3.8)
Record low °F (°C)	10 (−12)	12 (−11)	21 (−6)	20 (−7)	28 (−2)	25 (−4)	33 (1)	32 (0)	31 (−1)	25 (−4)	18 (−8)	6 (−14)	6 (−14)
Average precipitation inches (mm)	10.33 (262)	8.38 (213)	6.82 (173)	5.53 (140)	2.96 (75)	2.16 (55)	0.59 (15)	0.74 (19)	2.33 (59)	5.56 (141)	10.24 (260)	11.63 (295)	67.27 (1,707)
Average snowfall inches (cm)	0.0 (0.0)	0.0 (0.0)	0.0 (0.0)	0.0 (0.0)	0.0 (0.0)	0.0 (0.0)	0.0 (0.0)	0.0 (0.0)	0.0 (0.0)	0.0 (0.0)	0.0 (0.0)	0.1 (0.25)	0.1 (0.25)
Average precipitation days (≥ 0.01 in)	20.4	16.6	20.9	16.6	13.3	10.8	5.1	5.5	7.3	15.2	19.5	20.0	171.2
Average snowy days (≥ 0.1 in)	0.0	0.1	0.0	0.0	0.0	0.0	0.0	0.0	0.0	0.0	0.0	0.1	0.2
Average relative humidity (%)	82	83	83	81	81	82	81	82	81	81	83	83	82
Mean daily sunshine hours	4.0	4.0	5.5	7.4	8.4	9.4	10.7	10.4	9.0	5.3	4.4	4.2	6.9
Mean daily daylight hours	9.3	10.5	12.0	13.5	14.8	15.5	15.2	14.0	12.5	10.9	9.6	8.9	12.2
Average ultraviolet index	3	2	3	3	4	4	5	4	4	3	2	2	3
Source 1: NOAA
Source 2: Weather Atlas (UV and humidity)

== Demographics ==
Historical population
Census	Pop.	Note	%±
1880	52		—
1890	121		132.7%
1900	256		111.6%
1910	721		181.6%
1920	980		35.9%
1930	1,530		56.1%
1940	2,019		32.0%
1950	3,241		60.5%
1960	5,344		64.9%
1970	5,188		−2.9%
1980	7,519		44.9%
1990	8,437		12.2%
2000	9,532		13.0%
2010	9,989		4.8%
2020	10,256		2.7%

=== Racial and ethnic composition ===
Racial composition as of the 2020 census
Race	Number	Percent
White	7,599	74.1%
Black or African American	57	0.6%
American Indian and Alaska Native	262	2.6%
Asian	204	2.0%
Native Hawaiian and Other Pacific Islander	35	0.3%
Some other race	996	9.7%
Two or more races	1,103	10.8%
Hispanic or Latino (of any race)	1,954	19.1%

=== 2020 census ===
As of the 2020 census, Newport had a population of 10,256. The population density was about 1,028 people per square mile. The median age was 46.9 years, 18.3% of residents were under the age of 18, and 27.0% were 65 years of age or older. For every 100 females there were 92.8 males, and for every 100 females age 18 and over there were 91.1 males age 18 and over.

There were 4,600 households in Newport, of which 22.2% had children under the age of 18 living in them. Of all households, 39.1% were married-couple households, 19.7% were households with a male householder and no spouse or partner present, and 33.4% were households with a female householder and no spouse or partner present. About 35.8% of all households were made up of individuals and 19.4% had someone living alone who was 65 years of age or older. The average household size was 2.2 persons.

There were 5,697 housing units, of which 19.3% were vacant. Among occupied housing units, 53.5% were owner-occupied and 46.5% were renter-occupied. The homeowner vacancy rate was 2.4% and the rental vacancy rate was 7.1%.

98.8% of residents lived in urban areas, while 1.2% lived in rural areas.

The median household income was $52,897, the per capita income was $30,060, and 14.1% of the population were in poverty.

=== 2010 census ===
As of the census of 2010, there were 9,989 people, 4,354 households, and 2,479 families living in the city. The population density was about 1,104 inhabitants per square mile (426.3/km^{2}). There were 5,540 housing units at an average density of about 612 per square mile (236.3/km^{2}). The racial makeup of the city was 84.1% White, 0.6% African American, 2.1% Native American, 1.6% Asian, 0.2% Pacific Islander, 7.5% from other races, and 3.9% from two or more races. Hispanic or Latino of any race were 15.3% of the population.

There were 4,354 households, of which about 25% had children under the age of 18 living with them, 41% were married couples living together, 11% had a female householder with no husband present, 5% had a male householder with no wife present, and 43% were non-families. About 35% of all households were made up of individuals, and about 15% had someone living alone who was 65 years of age or older. The average household size was about 2.2 and the average family size was about 2.8.

The median age in the city was about 43 years. About 20% of residents were under the age of 18, 8% were between the ages of 18 and 24, 24% were from 25 to 44, 29% were from 45 to 64, and 19% were 65 years of age or older. The gender makeup of the city was 49.1% male and 50.9% female.

== Economy ==
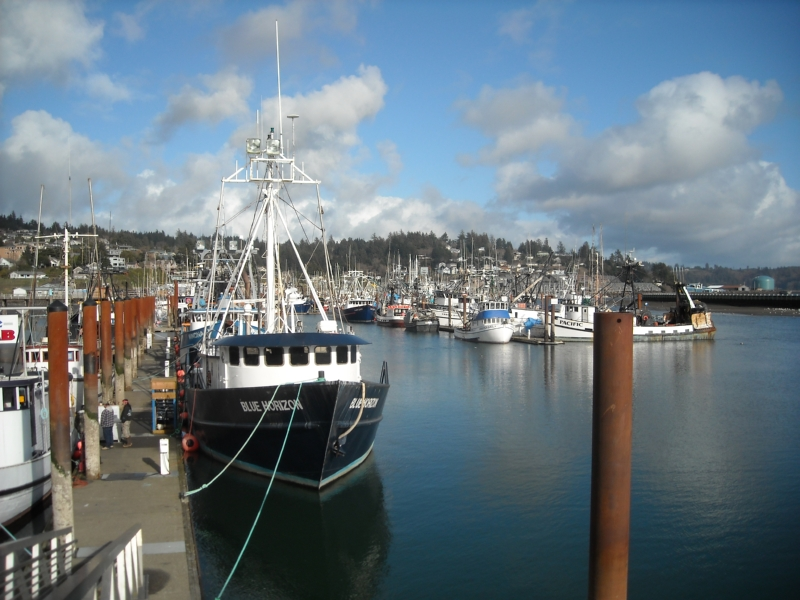
Harbor in Yaquina Bay, Newport

In August 2011, the National Oceanic and Atmospheric Administration moved its base for research ships from Seattle to Newport. The base boasts about 110 marine officers and a total of 175 employees. It bases four ships, including the NOAAS Bell M. Shimada and the NOAAS Rainier, and it provides support for up to two itinerant vessels. NOAA has personnel at the Hatfield Marine Science Center which support the fisheries science centers for Alaska and the Northwest. The ships join the R/V Oceanus and R/V Elakha research vessels based at the center.

Newport is home to the largest fishing fleet on the Oregon Coast.

== Education ==
The public schools in Newport are part of the Lincoln County School District, which covers the entire county, and include Newport High School, Newport Preparatory Academy, Newport Intermediate School, and Sam Case Primary School.

Lincoln County voters established Oregon Coast Community College in 1987, in which year the college held its first classes. The county is in the Oregon Coast Community College district.

Newport is also home to the Hatfield Marine Science Center, operated by Oregon State University in collaboration with state and federal agencies. The center conducts research and educational programs associated with the marine environment and serves as a primary field station for the university's College of Oceanic and Atmospheric Sciences.

== Government ==
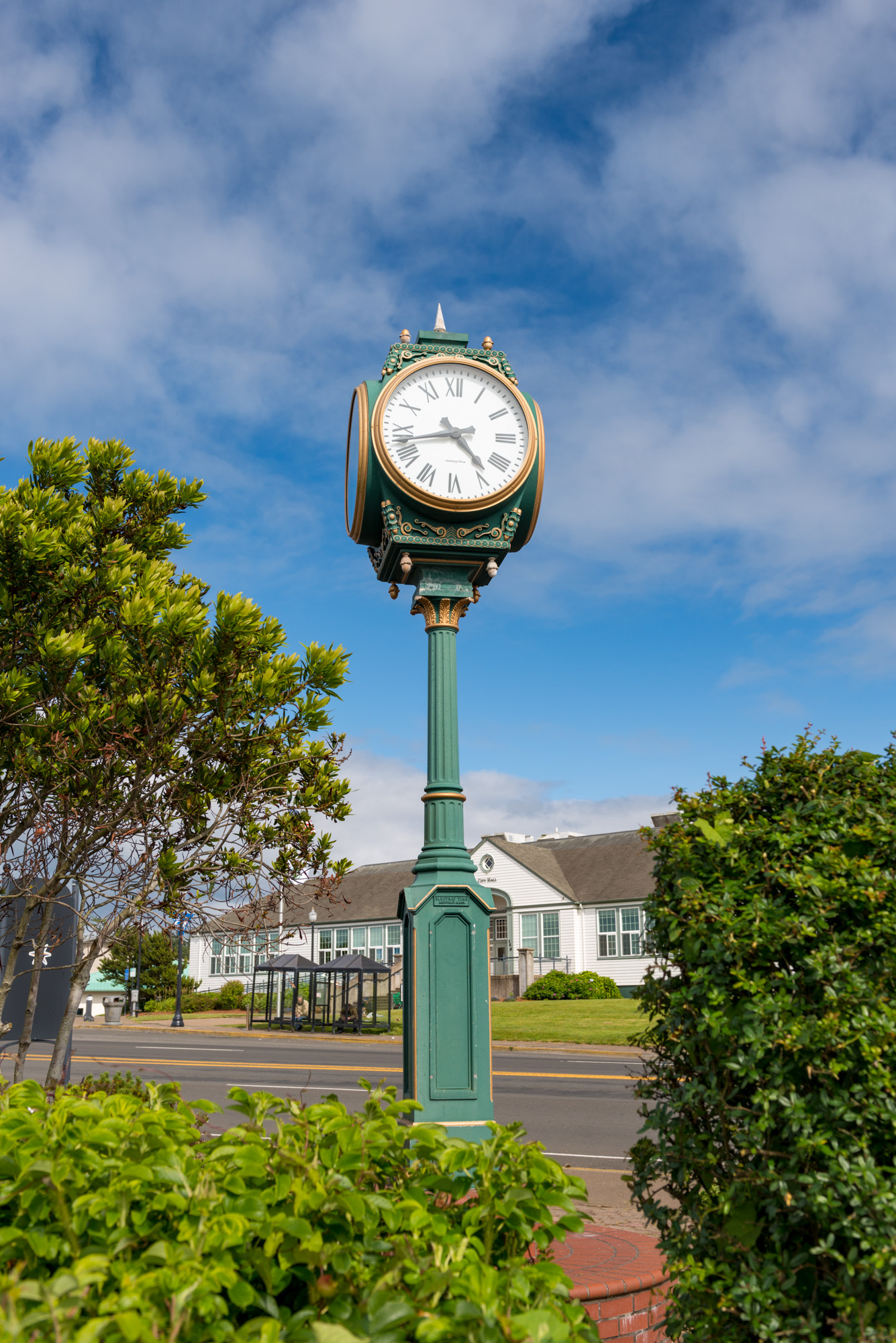
City hall

Newport is a charter city (also called a home rule city) and has a council-manager form of government. The city council consists of a Mayor who chairs the meetings, and 6 councilors. The mayor and city council served staggered terms, between two and four years.

== Media ==
=== Radio stations ===
Newport has several locally based stations:

- KPPT 100.7FM (Classic Hits)
- KNPT 1310AM (News/Talk)
- KYOR 88.9FM (Religious)
- KLOV 89.9FM (Christian Contemporary)
- KLCO 90.5FM (Public Radio/Lane Community College)
- KWAX 91.3FM (Classical)
- KNCU 92.7FM (Country)
- KRLZ 93.7FM (Hot AC)
- KWPB 98.7FM (Religious)
- KOGL 106.9FM (Public Radio)

=== Newspaper ===
The Lincoln County Leader is published once a week.

== Sister city ==
Newport has one sister city:

- Monbetsu, Japan

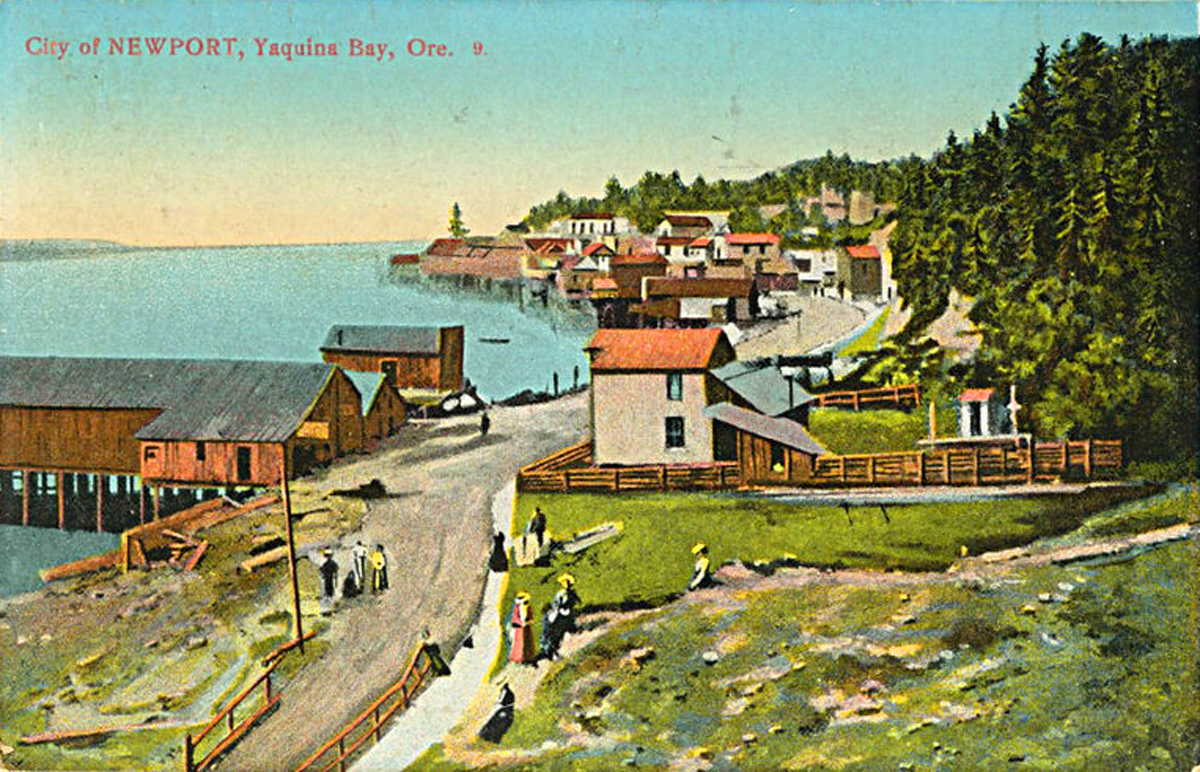
Newport bayfront as seen in the mid-1910s

== Notable people ==
- Sam Adams, former mayor of Portland, Oregon
- Scott Baker, marine biologist at the Marine Mammals Institute
- Nathan Ball, mechanical engineer, entrepreneur, TV host, and author
- Rick Bartow, artist
- Ernest Bloch, composer and humanist
- Alan Brown, member of the Oregon House of Representatives
- Joel Hedgpeth, marine biologist
- Christian Longo, convicted murderer
- Hedy Rijken, member of the Oregon House of Representatives
- Max Rijken, member of the Oregon House of Representatives and father of Hedy
- David Ogden Stiers, actor

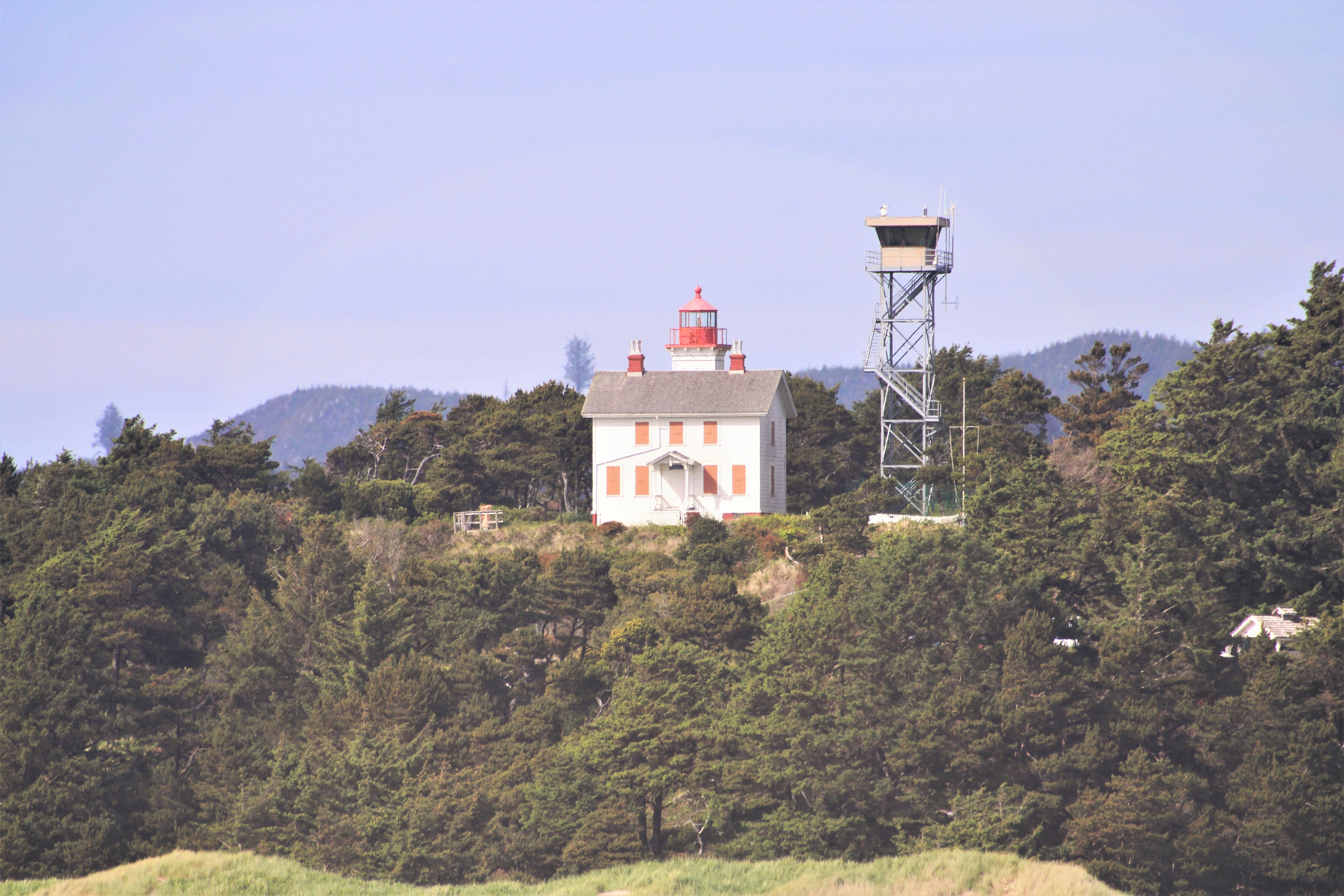
Yaquina Bay Light

== See also ==
- Jumpoff Joe, a former rock pillar on Nye Beach
- Newport Municipal Airport
- Siletz Reef
- Steamboats of the Oregon Coast
- Stonewall Bank
- Yaquina Bay
- Yaquina Head, a rocky headland
