= Mass media in Eugene, Oregon =

The following is a list of mass media in Eugene, Oregon, United States.

== Print ==
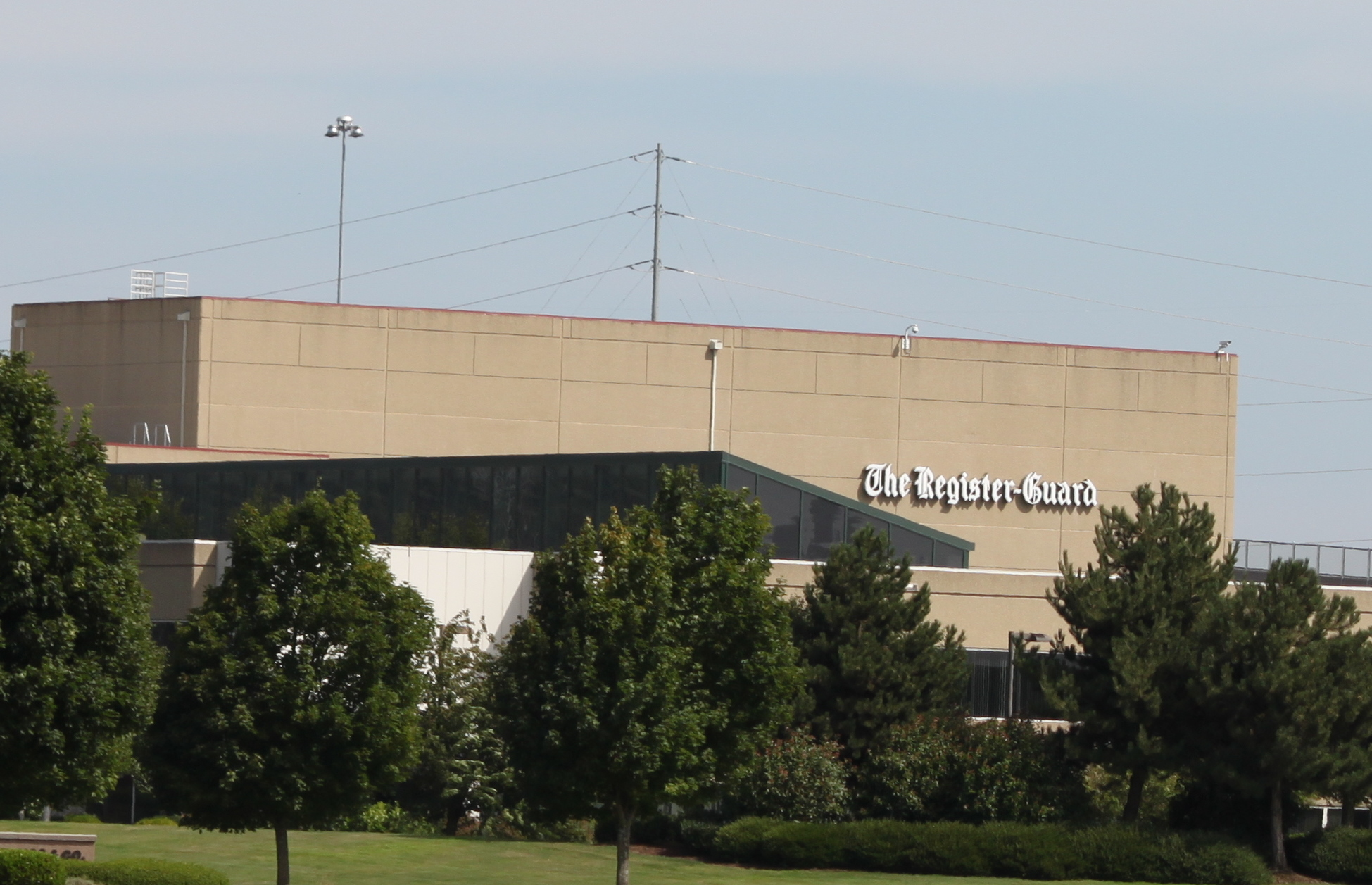
The Register-Guard building

=== Daily ===
- The Register-Guard - owned by USA Today Co.

=== Alternative weekly ===
- Eugene Weekly

=== Collegiate ===
- The Emerald - the student newspaper at the University of Oregon, published Mondays and Thursdays
- The Torch - the student newspaper at Lane Community College
- The Ignite - the newspaper at New Hope Christian College
- The Beacon-Bolt - the student newspaper at Bushnell University

=== Magazines ===
- Eugene Magazine
- Lifestyle Quarterly
- Eugene Living
- Sustainable Home and Garden

=== Spanish language ===
- Adelante Latino

== Digital Only ==
=== Daily ===
- Lookout Eugene-Springfield - owned by Local Lookout Inc, a public benefit corporation

== Television ==
The Eugene television market is ranked 117th in the nation with 218,200 homes with TVs and 0.204% of the U.S. market. It includes the counties of Lane, Benton, Douglas, and Coos. Among the stations it includes are:

- KEZI, Channel 9 - ABC, owned and operated by Allen Media Broadcasting
- KVAL, Channel 13 - CBS, owned and operated by the Sinclair Broadcast Group
- KMTR, Channel 16 - NBC, owned and operated by Roberts Media, LLC
- KEVU-CD, Channel 23 - MyNetworkTV, owned and operated by California Oregon Broadcasting, Inc.
- KEPB, Channel 19 - PBS, owned and operated by Oregon Public Broadcasting
- KLSR, Channel 34 - Fox, owned and operated by California Oregon Broadcasting, Inc.
- KTVC, Channel 36 - 3ABN (licensed to Roseburg)
- KHWB-LD, Channel 38 - TBN

== Radio ==
=== AM Stations ===
- KOAC 550 Corvallis - NPR News/Talk (Oregon Public Broadcasting)
- KUGN 590 Eugene - News/Talk (Cumulus)
- KXOR 660 Junction City - Spanish Religious (Zion Media)
- KKNX 840 Eugene - Classic Hits (Mielke Broadcasting)
- KORE 1050 Springfield - FOX Sports Radio
- KPNW 1120 Eugene - News/Talk (Bicoastal Media)
- KRVM 1280 Eugene - NPR News/Talk (Eugene School District)(JPR affiliate)
- KNND 1400 Cottage Grove - Classic Country (Reiten Communications Inc)
- KEED 1450 Eugene - Classic Country (Mielke Broadcasting)
- KOPB 1600 Eugene - NPR News/Talk (Oregon Public Broadcasting)

=== FM Stations ===
- KWVA 88.1 Eugene - Freeform (University of Oregon)
- KPIJ 88.5 Junction City - Christian (Calvary Satellite Network)(Calvary Chapel)
- KQFE 88.9 Springfield - Christian (Family Radio)
- KLCC 89.7 Eugene - NPR News/Talk/Jazz (Lane Community College)
- KWAX 91.1 Eugene - Classical (University of Oregon)
- KRVM 91.9 Eugene - Adult Album Alternative (Eugene School District)
- KKNU 93.3 Springfield - Country (McKenzie River Broadcasting)
- KMGE 94.5 Eugene - Adult Contemporary (McKenzie River Broadcasting)
- KUJZ 95.3 Creswell - Sports (Cumulus)
- KZEL 96.1 Eugene - Classic Rock (Cumulus)
- KEPW-LP 97.3 Eugene - PeaceWorks Community Radio (Eugene PeaceWorks)
- KEQB 97.7 Coburg - Regional Mexican (McKenzie River Broadcasting)
- KODZ 99.1 Eugene - '90s/'00s Hits (Bicoastal Media)
- KRKT 99.9 Albany - Country (Bicoastal Media)
- KMME 100.5 Cottage Grove - Catholic Program (Catholic Radio Northwest)
- KFLY 101.5 Corvallis - Country (Bicoastal Media)
- KEHK 102.3 Brownsville - Hot Adult Contemporary (Cumulus)
- KNRQ 103.7 Harrisburg - Alternative Rock (Cumulus)
- KDUK 104.7 Florence - Top 40 (Bicoastal Media)
- KEUG 105.5 Veneta - Adult Hits (McKenzie River Broadcasting)
- KLOO 106.3 Corvallis - Classic Rock (Bicoastal Media)
- KLVU 107.1 Sweet Home - Contemporary Christian Music (K-LOVE)(Educational Media Foundation)
- KHPE 107.9 Albany - Contemporary Christian Music (Extra Mile Media)
