= Las Vegas Raiders Radio Network =

NFL team radio network

- Type: Radio network
- Country: United States
- Headquarters: Las Vegas, Nevada
- Broadcast area: Nevada; California; Alaska (limited); Arkansas (limited); Hawaii (limited); Kansas (limited); Minnesota (limited); New Mexico (limited); Oregon (limited); Texas (limited); Utah (limited)
- Owner: Las Vegas Raiders
- Established: 1966 (as the Oakland Raiders Radio Network)
- Affiliations: Compass Media Networks; Lotus Communications
- Affiliates: 52 English affiliates (including 2 flagships); 8 Spanish affiliates (including 1 flagship)
- Official website: Raiders Radio Network
- Language: English and Spanish

The Las Vegas Raiders Radio Network is an American radio network composed of 52 radio stations which carry English-language coverage of the Las Vegas Raiders, a professional football team in the National Football League (NFL). Las Vegas market stations KRLV (920 AM) and KOMP (92.3 FM) serve as the network's two flagships. The network also includes 50 affiliates in the U.S. states of Nevada, California, Alaska, Arizona, Hawaii, Kansas, Minnesota, New Mexico, Oregon, Texas and Utah: 34 AM stations, sixteen of which supplement their signals with a low-power FM translator and one repeated over an HD Radio FM digital subchannel; and 16 full-power FM stations, four of which supplement their signals with a low-power FM translator. Jason Horowitz is the current play-by-play announcer, while Lincoln Kennedy serves as color commentator; George Atkinson and Jim Plunkett offer pre- and post-game commentary. Compass Media Networks is responsible for producing and distributing the network to these aforementioned terrestrial radio stations.

Complementing this coverage, Las Vegas market station KENO (1460 AM) serves as the flagship of a secondary radio network carrying Spanish-language coverage of the Raiders. This network includes 8 affiliates in the U.S. states of Nevada and California: 5 AM stations and 3 FM stations. Harry Ruiz is the current Spanish-language play-by-play announcer with Ernesto Amador serving as color commentator.

In addition to traditional over-the-air AM and FM broadcasts, network programming airs on SiriusXM satellite radio; and streams online via SiriusXM Internet Radio, TuneIn Premium, and NFL+.

== History ==
From 2004 to 2009, the flagship was KSFO (560 AM) in San Francisco with a network of thirty radio stations in Hawaii, Oregon, Nevada, New Mexico, and British Columbia. During most of the 1970s, KGO (810 AM) was the flagship station.

Bill King—the "Voice of the Raiders"—called the Oakland/Los Angeles Raiders from 1966 to 1992. He called approximately 600 games. The Raiders awarded him all three rings. King left after the 1992 season. It's Bill's radio audio heard on most of the NFL Films highlight footage of the Raiders. King's color men in Oakland included former San Francisco 49ers tight end Monty Stickles and Scotty Stirling, a sports writer for the Oakland Tribune. Many of the years, KGO 810 did promos as "Raider Radio 81". King's call of the Holy Roller has been labeled (by Chris Berman, among others) as one of 5 best in NFL history. King died in October 2005 from complications after surgery. Scotty Stirling, an Oakland Tribune sportswriter, served as the "color man" with King. The Raider games were called on radio from 1960 to 1962 by Bud (Wilson Keene) Foster and Mel Venter and from 1963 to 1965 by Bob Blum and Dan Galvin.

Until their dismissal prior to the 2018 season, Greg Papa was the voice of the Raiders with former Raiders quarterback and head coach Tom Flores doing commentary from 1997 until 2017. From 2018 until 2022, Brent Musburger was the voice of the Raiders.

== Station list ==
English language network stations as of the 2021 Raiders season
Callsign	Frequency	Band	City	State	Network status
KRLV	920	AM	Las Vegas	Nevada	Flagship
KOMP	92.3	FM	Las Vegas	Nevada	Flagship
KTHH	990	AM	Albany	Oregon	Affiliate
KQTM	101.7	FM	Albuquerque	New Mexico	Affiliate
KOAN	1080	AM	Anchorage	Alaska	Affiliate
K236CG	95.1	FM	Anchorage	Alaska	KOAN relay
KHRQ	96.9	FM	Baker	California	KHDR repeater
KGEO	1230	AM	Bakersfield	California	Affiliate
K266CG	101.1	FM	Bakersfield	California	KGEO relay
K232EA	96.3	FM	Carson City	Nevada	KTHX-FM relay
KPAY	93.9	FM	Chico	California	Affiliate
K243BT	96.5	FM	Clearlake	California	KXBX relay
KFPT	790	AM	Clovis	California	Affiliate
KEJO	1240	AM	Corvallis	Oregon	Affiliate
KXO-FM	107.5	FM	El Centro	California	Affiliate
KHEY	1380	AM	El Paso	Texas	Affiliate
KEAU	104.7	FM	Elko	Nevada	Affiliate
KORE	1050	AM	Eugene	Oregon	Affiliate
K275CX	102.9	FM	Eugene	Oregon	KORE relay
KWSW	980	AM	Eureka	California	Affiliate
KDAC	1230	AM	Fort Bragg	California	KUKI repeater
KFIG	1430	AM	Fresno	California	Affiliate
KBUF	1030	AM	Garden City	Kansas	Affiliate
KHVH	830	AM	Honolulu	Hawaii	Affiliate
KFNC	97.5	FM	Houston	Texas	Affiliate
KAOI	1110	AM	Kihei	Hawaii	Affiliate
K254CS	98.7	FM	Kihei	Hawaii	KAOI relay
KRKC-FM	102.1	FM	King City	California	Affiliate
KXBX	1270	AM	Lakeport	California	Affiliate
KHDR	94.9	FM	Lenwood	California	Affiliate
KLAA	830	AM	Los Angeles	California	Affiliate
K289CB	105.7	FM	Los Banos	California	KBRE relay
KDJK	103.9	FM	Mariposa	California	KHKK repeater
K244AG	96.7	FM	Maui	Hawaii	KAOI relay
KBRE	1660	AM	Merced	California	Affiliate
KHKK	104.1	FM	Modesto	California	Affiliate
KHIP	104.3	FM	Monterey	California	Affiliate
KTOX	1340	AM	Needles	California	Affiliate
K225DF	92.9	FM	Needles	California	KTOX relay
KCLB-FM	93.7	FM	Palm Springs	California	Affiliate
KPRL	1230	AM	Paso Robles	California	Affiliate
K257GL	99.3	FM	Paso Robles	California	KPRL relay
K233CM	94.5	FM	Petaluma	California	KSRO relay
KQFN	1580	AM	Phoenix	Arizona	Affiliate
K257CD	99.3	FM	Phoenix	Arizona	KQFN relay
KOAL	750	AM	Price	Utah	Affiliate
K297BV	107.3	FM	Price	Utah	KOAL relay
KNRO	1440	AM	Redding	California	Affiliate
K280GP	103.9	FM	Redding	California	KNRO relay
KTHX-FM	94.5	FM	Reno	Nevada	Affiliate
KPLY	630	AM	Reno	Nevada	Affiliate
KPWK	1350	AM	Riverside	California	Affiliate
KHTK	1140	AM	Sacramento	California	Affiliate
KYMX-HD2*	96.1-2	FM	Sacramento	California	KHTK repeater
KSAC-FM	105.5	FM	Sacramento	California	Affiliate
KZNS	1280	AM	Salt Lake City	Utah	Affiliate
KZNS-FM	97.5	FM	Salt Lake City	Utah	Affiliate
KGB	760	AM	San Diego	California	Affiliate
KXTK	1280	AM	San Luis Obispo	California	Affiliate
K269GY	101.7	FM	San Luis Obispo	California	KXTK relay
KSRO	1350	AM	Santa Rosa	California	Affiliate
K278CD	103.5	FM	Santa Rosa	California	KSRO relay
WBHR	660	AM	Sauk Rapids	Minnesota	Affiliate
W239CU	96.3	FM	Sauk Rapids	Minnesota	WBHR relay
KHKR	1210	AM	St. George	Utah	Affiliate
K249EQ	97.7	FM	St. George	Utah	KHKR relay
KWSX	1280	AM	Stockton	California	Affiliate
K279DB	103.7	FM	Stockton	California	KWSX relay
K240EU	95.9	FM	Tempe	Arizona	KQFN relay
KCLZ	95.5	FM	Twentynine Palms	California	KCLB-FM repeater
KUKI	1400	AM	Ukiah	California	Affiliate
K242AD	96.3	FM	Ukiah	California	KUKI relay
KLLK	1250	AM	Willits	California	KUKI repeater

- Asterisk (*) indicates HD Radio broadcast.
- Blue background indicates low-power FM translator.

=== Spanish-language stations ===
Call sign	Frequency	Band	City	State	Network status
KENO	1460	AM	Las Vegas	Nevada	Flagship
KWAC	1490	AM	Bakersfield	California	Affiliate
KHIT-FM	107.1	FM	Fresno	California	Affiliate
KFWB	980	AM	Los Angeles	California	Affiliate
KFOY	1060	AM	Reno	Nevada	Affiliate
KVMX	92.1	FM	Sacramento	California	Affiliate
XHMORE **	98.9	FM	San Diego	California	Affiliate
KSFN	1510	AM	San Francisco	California	Affiliate

- **Station has a concession from the IFT to serve Tijuana, Baja California, Mexico, but services the San Diego–Tijuana market.
