= Lars Larson =

American conservative talk radio show host (born 1959)

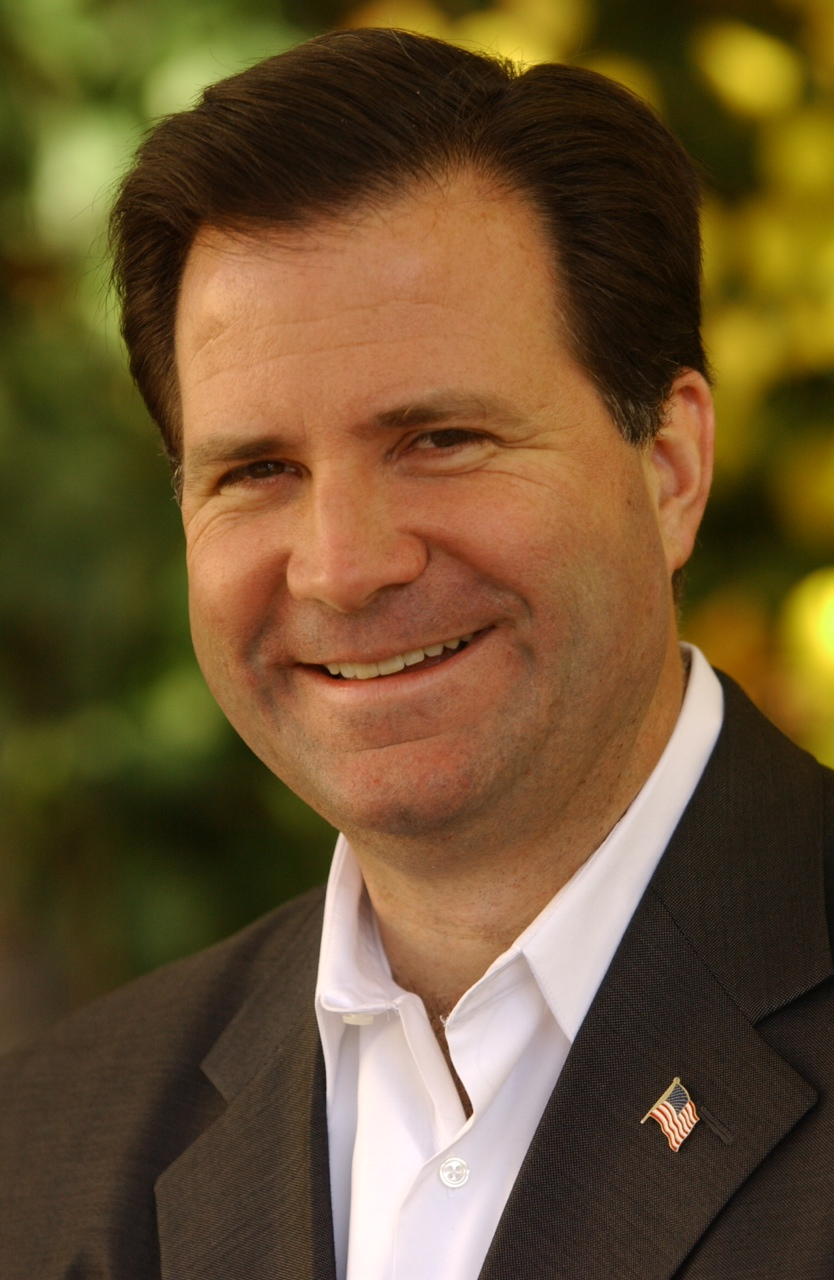
- Larson in 2013
- Born: Lars Kristopher Larson; March 6, 1959 (age 67); Taipei, Taiwan
- Occupation: radio personality
- Employer(s): Alpha Broadcasting, Compass Media Networks
- Spouses: Debb Janes (1991–1995); Tina Larson (1997–present)
- Children: 2 (step-children)
- Website: www.larslarson.com

Lars Kristopher Larson (born March 6, 1959) is an American conservative talk radio show host based in Portland, Oregon. Larson worked in television and radio news from the 1970s to 1990s and has hosted The Lars Larson Show from flagship station KXL in Portland since 1997. Two versions of the show exist: the Northwest show airs from 12 p.m. to 3 p.m. (Pacific) and discussing Pacific Northwest issues. The Northwest show is syndicated on the Radio Northwest Network which is owned and operated by Alpha Media. The nationally syndicated program airs from 3 p.m. to 6 p.m. (Pacific) and discusses national issues. The national show is syndicated by Compass Media Networks.

== Early life ==
Larson was born in Taipei, Taiwan. His father served in the United States Navy, and when he began a career in forestry, the Larson family lived in Montana, California (Happy Camp, Somes Bar, and Dorris), and Klamath Falls, Oregon, before settling in Tillamook, Oregon, when Lars was a teenager. He graduated from Tillamook High School in 1977, where he was on the speech and debate team.

Larson began his broadcasting career at age 16, at KTIL in his hometown of Tillamook, Oregon, learning his trade under Mildred Davy. He later became an announcer at Eugene-based KWAX. From 1977-1979, Larson attended the University of Oregon in Eugene, but quit "after just a year to work in radio and television".

== Career ==
Larson served as news director for KATR in Eugene from 1977 to 1978 and KBDF from 1978 to 1979 with internships at KEZI television and KPNW radio. He was later news director at KZEL in Eugene before moving to KJRB in Spokane, Washington in 1979 to be a reporter. While in Spokane, Larson took classes at Gonzaga University.

In 1980, Larson moved to Portland, Oregon, and KXL where he did the afternoon news. In 1983, he moved back to Eugene and was a reporter and eventually anchor for KVAL-TV. In 1985, Larson moved back to Portland, when he was hired by KPTV as a reporter for The 10 O'Clock News.

In 1988, he hosted a weekend talk show on KEX and transferred to KGW, where he would stay from 1989 to 1991.

In 1992, he helped to create the KPTV news magazine program Northwest Reports, a weekly one-hour show which debuted in September of that year. Previously, since at least 1990, KPTV had aired documentaries or investigative stories under the name "Northwest Reports with Lars Larson" as segments within regular newscasts or occasionally as one-time specials, but not as a regular program. For the new weekly show, Larson was both executive producer and on-air anchor. It was a "60 Minutes-style investigative show" but focused on the Portland area and the Northwest. The program won a regional Emmy Award for a story that exposed careless handling of customers' private financial information by certain local banks.

The Oregonian reported that Northwest Reports had "decent ratings" against "strong network competition", but not enough to attract sufficient advertising revenue. The program lasted more than four years, but was canceled in fall 1996, after which Larson resumed anchor duties on KPTV's 10 O'Clock News.

=== The Lars Larson Show ===
In his radio career, Larson moved back to KXL in 1997, this time hosting a talk show, The Lars Larson Show, which aired from noon to 4 p.m. Continuing as news anchor at KPTV, Larson left the station in November 1998 "after months of pressure from station management over his other role as an outspoken radio talk-show host" on KXL. KPTV management viewed his radio talk-show role as a conflict of interest with his role as a news anchor.

He later began working at KOIN TV, hosting the morning program The Buzz until 2000.

On January 31, 2000, The Lars Larson Show began airing on nine radio stations via "The Radio Northwest Network". On August 14, 2003, Larson was hired by Westwood One Radio Network to host his own show for national syndication. The Lars Larson Show officially debuted on Westwood One on September 1, 2003, with 105 affiliates and grew to 175 affiliates.

On March 19, 2009, Westwood One canceled The Lars Larson Show. Larson's national network show re-launched on newly-formed Compass Media Networks on March 30, 2009. In 2015 the show was picked up by Sinclair Broadcast Group's Seattle radio outlet KVI-AM (Talk Radio 570). With the addition of Seattle, the show aired on 18 stations in the Pacific Northwest through the Radio Northwest Network. In December 2022 Compass Media Networks a multi-year extension, continuing to serve as the "exclusive home" of The Lars Larson Show for national syndication, then heard in 130 markets.

== Conservative principles ==
Larson's conservative ideology focuses on limited government, free markets, and individual liberty, which he views as essential to preserving economic vitality and personal autonomy. Government overreach distorts incentives and stifles innovation, he argues, advocating instead for restrained state functions confined to core protections and services (like national security). His beliefs derive from observations of the results of market efficiencies, where voluntary exchanges outperform centralized planning, economically and socially, according to some value systems.

== Personal life ==
In the early 1990s, Larson was married to Debb Janes, a Portland radio personality. In 1997, Larson married Tina Larson. They live in Vancouver, Washington. He has two step-children. Larson has one sister, Patty Schild, of Sisters, Oregon.

== Awards ==
- National Press Club award "Can't You Hear the Whistle Blow?" (KPTV News 1988) This was also a finalist for a national Emmy.
- Peabody Award 1990 (KPTV Northwest Reports: "Mount St. Helens: A Decade Later")
- Northwest Regional Emmy Award for best investigative reporting (1994 KPTV Northwest Reports: "The Round File", with Gordon Coffin)
- In 2002, Larson was first listed in Talkers Magazine's Heavy Hundred of the most important radio hosts in the U.S. In 2020, Talkers Magazine rated Larson the 13th, and he ranked 14th in 2024.
