= KLOO =

KLOO may refer to:

- KLOO-FM, a radio station (106.3 FM) licensed to Corvallis, Oregon, United States
- KLOO (AM), a radio station (1340 AM) licensed to Corvallis, Oregon, United States
- Kloo, meaning "canoe" in the Haida language, is a variant spelling of the First Nations reserve of New Clew, British Columbia or Clew in the Queen Charlotte Islands of British Columbia, Canada
