= KZAM =

KZAM may refer to:

- KZAM (FM), a radio station (98.7 FM) licensed to Pleasant Valley, Texas, United States
- KSCR, a defunct radio station (1320 AM) formerly licensed to Eugene, Oregon, United States, which used the KZAM call letters from 1985 to 1990
- KUJZ, a radio station (96.3 FM) licensed to Creswell, Oregon, United States, which used the KZAM-FM call letters from 1985 to 1990
- KQMV, a radio station (92.5 FM) in Seattle, Washington, United States, which used the KZAM call letters from 1961 to 1964 and from 1974 to 1983
