= KPNW =

KPNW may refer to:

- KPNW (AM), a radio station (1120 AM) licensed to serve Eugene, Oregon, United States
- KPNW-FM, a radio station (98.9 FM) licensed to serve Seattle, Washington, United States
- KODZ, a radio station (99.1 FM) licensed to Eugene, Oregon, which held the call sign KPNW-FM from 1968 to 1994
- KLCC (FM), a radio station (89.7 FM) licensed to Eugene, Oregon, which held the call sign KPNW from January to August 1967
