= KDAC =

Satellite of KUKI, Ukiah
- Fort Bragg, California; United States
- Broadcast area: Mendocino Coast
- Frequency: 1230 kHz

Programming
- Format: Classic hits

Ownership
- Owner: Bicoastal Media Licenses, LLC
- Sister stations: KLLK; KUKI; KUKI-FM

History
- First air date: November 6, 1947
- Last air date: September 2025

Technical information
- Licensing authority: FCC
- Facility ID: 51880
- Class: C
- Power: 1,000 watts unlimited
- Transmitter coordinates: 39.443°N 123.781°W
- Translator: 104.1 K281CV (Fort Bragg)

Links
- Public license information: Public file; LMS
- Website: www.kuki.com

KDAC (1230 AM) was a radio station broadcasting a classic hits format as a simulcast of KUKI from Ukiah. It was licensed to Fort Bragg, California, United States. The station was owned by Bicoastal Media Licenses, LLC.

== History ==
KDAC began broadcasting in 1948 on 1230 kHz with 250 watts power (full-time). The licensee was Mendocino Coast Broadcasting Company.

KDAC, along with KUKI in Ukiah, went silent for financial reasons in September 2025. The Federal Communications Commission cancelled the KDAC license on September 23, 2026.
