= KPRB (Oregon) =

Radio station in Redmond–Bend, Oregon (1952–1994)

- Redmond, Oregon; United States
- Broadcast area: Bend, Oregon
- Frequency: 1240 kHz

Programming
- Format: Country (simulcast of KSJJ)

Ownership
- Owner: Stewart Broadcasting

History
- First air date: October 7, 1952
- Last air date: August 1, 1994
- Former call signs: KSGA (1952–1953); KJUN (1953–1958)
- Call sign meaning: Prineville, Redmond, Bend

Technical information
- Licensing authority: FCC
- Facility ID: 55417
- Class: C
- Power: 1,000 watts day; 250 watts night

Links
- Public license information: Public file; LMS

KPRB was a radio station operating on 1240 AM in Redmond–Bend, Oregon. It went on the air in 1952 and was taken silent in 1994 so that its owner could buy other radio stations in the Bend area. The 1240 frequency was put up for auction after KPRB's license was surrendered and returned to the air as KRDM in 2004.

== History ==
KPRB signed on as KSGA on October 7, 1952, broadcasting with 250 watts. Owned by Oregon station owner Gordon Allen and Harold Singleton, it was affiliated with ABC upon signing on. Allen, however, sold the station within 9 months to founding general manager F. Gilbert Lieser; the call letters were changed on March 15, 1953 to KJUN, reflecting the name of the new ownership: Juniper Broadcasters. (Gordon Allen promptly used the KSGA call letters for the next station he started, KSGA in Cottage Grove, which launched on July 26, 1953.) Lieser then bought out Singleton's interest in KJUN that December.

KJUN was sold in 1956 to Lynn Thomas, general manager of a station at Coquille, for $50,000, with Lieser continuing on as manager. Thomas owned the station for less than two years before selling KJUN to Orlo M. Bagley of Cottage Grove, who had previously bought KSGA in Cottage Grove and changed its call letters to KOMB. Bagley relaunched KJUN as KPRB with a new program lineup at the beginning of June 1958.

Bagley did not own the station long: he sold it in 1959 to Donald and Rita Anderson. In 1963, the Andersons were approved to upgrade the station to broadcast with 1,000 watts during daytime hours. However, when Don Anderson was named the fire chief of Redmond in 1967, he announced his intention to sell KPRB to devote himself to his new duties. That sale would take two years, and two attempts, to be finalized. In August 1968, the Andersons filed to sell the station to William and Willa Miller; the Federal Communications Commission approved the application in February 1969, but the purchase was not consummated. Instead, that August, KPRB was sold to Richard Ernest Combs.

In 1974, Combs filed to sell the station to Big Sky Broadcasters, which was majority-owned by Ron Post of Albany; by this time, KPRB was a country music station. Combs cited health reasons as his reason to sell KPRB. Three years later, BBS Communications, owned by KPRB general manager William A. Moller, acquired Big Sky Broadcasters for $70,000. The ownership carousel that had characterized KPRB throughout its history spun again when California Oregon Broadcasting acquired the station in 1980. The next year, however, family problems inside the Smullin family prompted the company to be split, with Donald E. Smullin acquiring Klamath Falls television station KOTI, KLOO-AM-FM in Corvallis, and KPRB. BBS had applied for the 92.7 FM allotment for Redmond in 1980, but its bid was dismissed that May; the station went on the air February 4, 1981 as Contemporary Christian outlet KSBC, owned by the Sonshine Broadcasting Company. However, KSBC was sold twice in 1982, the second time to Donald E. Smullin's Bachelor Broadcasting Corporation for a total of $121,000. It became KPRB-FM on August 10, 1982, and the two stations formed a full-time country simulcast. Smullin owned KPRB-AM-FM until 1989, when the stations were sold to Redmond Broadcasting Group, controlled by Donald McCoun, for $500,000; under McCoun, KPRB-FM changed its call letters to KSJJ. McCoun sold KPRB and KSJJ for $710,000 to Stewart Broadcasting in 1992.

Stewart closed KPRB AM in 1994 as a direct result of its acquisition of Bend stations KGRL and KXIQ for $975,000. FCC ownership limits of the time required KPRB to be divested to complete the acquisition. KPRB was taken silent, and its license deleted, on August 1, 1994.
