= KSCR =

KSCR may refer to:

- KSCR-FM, a radio station (93.5 FM) licensed to Benson, Minnesota, United States
- KSCR (AM), a defunct radio station (1320 AM) formerly licensed to Eugene, Oregon, United States
- KSCR (USC AM radio station), an unlicensed radio station of the University of Southern California
