= KXOR =

KXOR may refer to:

- KXOR (AM), a radio station (660 AM) licensed to Junction City, Oregon, United States
- KXOR-LP, a low-power television station (channel 36) licensed to Eugene, Oregon
- KLXH, a radio station (106.3 FM) licensed to Thibodaux, Louisiana, United States, which held the call sign KXOR-FM from 1973 to 2017
