= KSCR (AM) =

- Eugene, Oregon; United States
- Broadcast area: Eugene–Springfield
- Frequency: 1320 kHz

Ownership
- Owner: Cumulus Media; (Cumulus Licensing LLC)
- Sister stations: KUJZ; KZEL-FM; KNRQ; KEHK; KUGN

History
- First air date: June 12, 1962
- Last air date: July 11, 2021
- Former call signs: KATR (1962–1981); KQDQ (1981–1985); KZAM (1985–1990); KHNN (1990–1992); KZZK (1992–1995); KNRQ (1995–2001)
- Call sign meaning: "Score"

Technical information
- Facility ID: 30649
- Class: D
- Power: 1,000 watts (day); 48 watts (night)
- Transmitter coordinates: 44°05′16″N 123°06′48″W
- Translator: 98.1 K251BN (Eugene)

KSCR (1320 AM) was a radio station airing a soft adult contemporary format. Licensed to Eugene, Oregon, United States, the station served the Eugene-Springfield area. The station, which operated from 1962 to 2021, was owned by Cumulus Media.

== History ==
The station, launched in 1962 as KATR, was assigned call sign KZAM on August 20, 1985. On May 1, 1990, the station changed its call sign to KHNN, with an all-news format. On October 1, 1992, it changed to KZZK with the satellite-fed "Z-Rock" format. On September 29, 1995, it became "New Rock" alternative station KNRQ, a simulcast of KNRQ-FM 95.3. In late 2000, KNRQ dropped its simulcast with KNRQ-FM, and picked up a sports format as "1320 The Score". The call letters were changed on April 26, 2001 to KSCR. KSCR aired University of Oregon women's basketball as a member of the Oregon Sports Network.

On April 1, 2010, KSCR changed its format from sports (as "The Score") to business news and talk, branded as "1320 Info Radio". The station featured three local business talk shows, including long-time Eugene talk radio personality Steve Tannen. His show, SportsTalk, was followed by The Writer's Block with The Register-Guard sports columnist George Schroeder and KSCR's Justin Myers. Myers continued with his afternoon drive program, The Sports Idol.

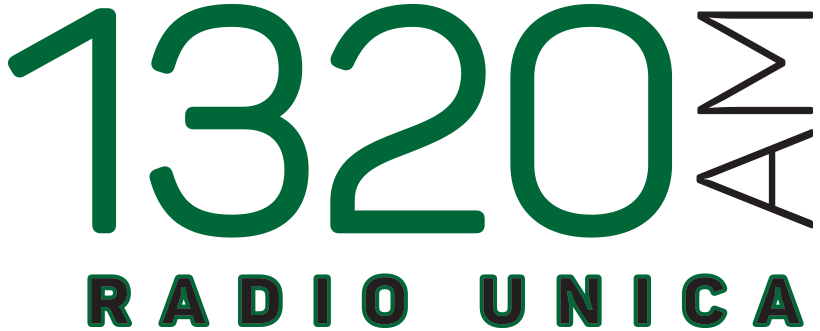
Logo as "Radio Unica", 2015-2017

On April 20, 2015, KSCR changed its format to regional Mexican, branded as "1320 Radio Unica", which featured Spanish news and talk programming.

On December 13, 2017, KSCR began stunting with Christmas music, and also began simulcasting on FM translator K251BN (98.1 FM). On January 1, 2018, KSCR launched a soft adult contemporary format.

On July 15, 2021, Cumulus surrendered the licenses of KSCR and K251BN.
