= KFLY =

Radio station in Corvallis–Eugene, Oregon

- Corvallis, Oregon; United States
- Broadcast area: Willamette Valley
- Frequency: 101.5 MHz
- Branding: US 101

Programming
- Format: Country
- Affiliations: Premiere Networks

Ownership
- Owner: Bicoastal Media; (Bicoastal Media Licenses V, LLC)
- Sister stations: KDUK-FM, KEJO, KLOO, KLOO-FM, KODZ, KPNW, KRKT-FM, KTHH

History
- First air date: October 1, 1966
- Former call signs: KFLY-FM (1966–1979); KEJO (1979–1994)

Technical information
- Licensing authority: FCC
- Facility ID: 39574
- Class: C0
- ERP: 28,000 watts
- HAAT: 707 meters (2,320 ft)
- Transmitter coordinates: 44°38′24″N 123°16′25″W

Links
- Public license information: Public file; LMS
- Webcast: Listen live

KFLY (101.5 FM) is a commercial radio station licensed to Corvallis, Oregon, United States, that serves the Willamette Valley of west-central Oregon. It airs a country music format and is owned by Bicoastal Media. KFLY's studios are on Valley River Drive in Eugene.

KFLY's signal extends across Eugene–Springfield, Albany, Lebanon, Junction City and Salem; its transmitter is on a mountaintop near Blachly.

== History ==
=== Top 40, Easy Listening and Active Rock ===
KFLY-FM signed on the air on October 1, 1966. It originally simulcast its sister station's Top 40 format (now KEJO 1240). By the mid-1970s, it had its own easy listening format with some classical music at night. In 1979, KFLY-FM changed its call sign to KEJO, standing for Emily Jo, the late daughter of the station's owner. For many years, 101.5 KEJO had an automated adult contemporary format, with no air personalities.

In January 1994, the FM swapped call letters with the AM (1240) bringing KFLY back to 101.5 FM. Branded as "Flight 101" the station aired a local morning show, with the rest of the day-parts airing Jones Radio Network's satellite-fed hot adult contemporary format. By 1996, "Flight 101.5" KFLY had dropped the satellite-fed programming, for a locally programmed (Top 40-leaning) Hot AC format. By 2000, the station had rebranded as "Mix 101-5 KFLY" with a straight-ahead Hot AC format, under the ownership of Clear Channel Communications (a forerunner to today's iHeartMedia).

In the summer of 2002, KFLY moved its transmitter site to the high-elevation KDUK-FM tower, greatly increasing its coverage area, and targeting the Eugene-Springfield market. It briefly stunted with quick song clips for a few hours. It then flipped to active rock as “101-5 K-Fly” with studios in Eugene.

=== The Donkey Show ===
From the early 2000s until 2015, The Donkey Show was heard in afternoon drive time, 2 to 6 p.m. It featured Tanner, Drew, and Marcus along with their producer Cory, camera guy/audio producer Kirk, Mandy and Carl. The show had a replay hour locally in Eugene from 6pm -7pm called the Donkey Show Rewind. The Donkey Show aired on both KFLY and co-owned 106.3 KZZE in Medford (now KMED).

The Donkey Show used the tagline "The only legal donkey show in America." In addition to music, it covered national and local topics, along with giveaways, stunts, interviews and comedy bits.

On July 15, 2015, KFLY's entire airstaff was let go, indicating a format change was imminent. On July 30, 2015, at noon, KFLY changed its format to adult album alternative, branded as "World Class Rock 101.5". The AAA format lasted two years.

=== U.S. 101 Country ===
On June 4, 2017, KFLY dropped its AAA format and began stunting again. It used a text-to-speech countdown with voice of Microsoft David. At 3 p.m. the following day, the station flipped to country music as "US 101".

Pat Garrett, formerly of country station 94.1 KMPS-FM Seattle, was named program director. The Bobby Bones Show from Nashville was chosen for morning drive time. KFLY would compete for country listeners in the Eugene-Springfield radio market with the top music station, 93.3 KKNU.
