= KEED =

Radio station in Eugene, Oregon, United States

- Eugene, Oregon; United States
- Broadcast area: Eugene and Vicinity
- Frequency: 1450 kHz
- Branding: Classic Country KEED AM

Programming
- Format: Classic country

Ownership
- Owner: Mielke Broadcasting Group
- Sister stations: KKNX

History
- First air date: 1954
- Former call signs: KRGA (1954–1955); KEED (1955–1985); KRXX (1985–1987); KKXO (1987–2004); KOPT (2004–2005); KLZS (2005–2017)

Technical information
- Licensing authority: FCC
- Facility ID: 40889
- Class: C
- Power: 1,000 watts
- Transmitter coordinates: 44°4′53.4″N 123°6′38.3″W
- Translator: 104.3 K282CA (Eugene)

Links
- Public license information: Public file; LMS
- Webcast: Listen Live
- Website: keed1450.com

KEED (1450 AM) is a commercial radio station licensed to Eugene, Oregon, United States. The station is owned by Mielke Broadcasting Group.

== History ==
According to Federal Communications Commission (FCC) records, KEED (Facility ID #40889) dates back to 1927. However, because the station inherited the KEED call sign in a 1966 call letter swap with the original KEED, it has traditionally traced its history to the debut of the original KEED in 1954.

=== Original KEED on AM 1050 ===
In 1954, a new station in Eugene on AM 1050, with the call letters KRGA, was licensed to W. Gordon Allen. This station changed its call sign to KEED the next year.

=== 1966 call letter swap of KORE and KEED ===
In November 1966, the call signs of KORE and KEED were swapped, with AM 1450 changed to KEED from KORE, while AM 1050 changed to KORE from KEED.

The station on AM 1450 changed its call sign to KLZS on April 22, 2005. As KLZS, for several years, the station broadcast a Spanish language sports radio format branded as "ESPN Deportes 1450" to the greater Eugene area as an ESPN Deportes Radio affiliate. This programming was aired in conjunction with sister station KXPD (1040 AM) in Portland, Oregon. On November 15, 2009, KLZS switched to a satellite-fed English language smooth jazz music format branded as "Smooth Jazz Network" from Broadcast Architecture.

On December 30, 2009, KLZS went off the air citing "substantial decreases in its revenue flow" over the past three years. In its application to the FCC for special temporary authority to remain silent, the station's license holder claimed that "losses have reached the point that the station no longer generates sufficient funds to pay operating expenses" and that the company is seeking to either sell the station or refinance and return to operation. The FCC granted the station authority to remain silent on March 4, 2010. The station returned to the air on May 11, 2010, broadcasting an oldies format as a simulcast of KKNX (840 AM, "Radio 84").

In December 2011, Churchill Media, LLC, applied to the FCC to transfer KLZS and sister station KXOR to "Arlie & Company". Both companies were wholly owned by Suzanne K. Arlie and the transfer was made as a "business reorganization". The FCC approved the move on December 29, 2011, and formal consummation of the transaction took place the same day.

Beginning November 1, 2012, KLZS broadcast a comedy format under the name "All Comedy 1450". The station broadcast a mix of stand up and interviews from the All Comedy Radio Network and local programming with professional comedians from the Eugene-Springfield area. Effective January 15, 2013, KLZS was purchased by Eugene Comedy Radio.

On June 14, 2017, KLZS went silent. Effective July 28, 2017, Eugene Comedy Radio sold KLZS to Mielke Broadcasting Group for $226,000. Mielke changed the station's call sign to its earlier KEED on August 1, 2017. The next day, KEED returned to the air with a simulcast of oldies-formatted KKNX 840 AM. On August 7, 2017, KEED changed their format to classic country.
