= KWRX =

Radio station in Redmond–Bend, Oregon

Coordinates: 44.437°N 120.954°W

- Redmond, Oregon; United States
- Broadcast area: Bend, Oregon
- Frequency: 88.5 MHz
- Branding: KWAX

Programming
- Format: Classical music

Ownership
- Owner: University of Oregon

History
- First air date: 2002

Technical information
- Licensing authority: FCC
- Facility ID: 90887
- Class: C2
- ERP: 950 watts
- HAAT: 670 meters
- Translator: See below

Links
- Public license information: Public file; LMS
- Webcast: Listen Live
- Website: kwax.com

KWRX (88.5 FM) is a non-commercial classical music radio station in Redmond, Oregon, broadcasting to the Bend, Oregon area. KWRX is a simulcast of KWAX in Eugene, Oregon.

== Repeaters and Translators ==
KWRX is simulcast on the following stations and translators:

- 91.1 FM in Eugene, Oregon (KWAX)
- 91.5 FM in Florence, Oregon (KWVZ)
- 90.9 FM in Sunriver, Oregon
- 91.3 FM in Newport, Oregon
- 92.9 FM in Corvallis, Oregon
- 92.9 FM in Salem, Oregon
- 97.9 FM in Roseburg, Oregon
- 98.9 FM in Bend, Oregon
- 101.9 FM in Cottage Grove, Oregon
- 105.3 FM in Glide, Oregon
