= KLOO (AM) =

Radio station in Corvallis, Oregon

- Corvallis, Oregon; United States
- Frequency: 1340 kHz
- Branding: Newsradio 1340 KLOO

Programming
- Format: Talk radio
- Affiliations: Fox News Radio; Compass Media Networks; Premiere Networks; Westwood One

Ownership
- Owner: Bicoastal Media; (Bicoastal Media Licenses V, LLC)
- Sister stations: KDUK-FM, KEJO, KFLY, KLOO-FM, KODZ, KPNW, KRKT-FM, KTHH

History
- First air date: August 23, 1947
- Former call signs: KRUL (1947–1957)
- Call sign meaning: "Locally owned and operated"

Technical information
- Licensing authority: FCC
- Facility ID: 67594
- Class: C
- Power: 1,000 watts
- Transmitter coordinates: 44°35′38″N 123°13′30″W
- Translator: 96.5 K243CW (Corvallis)

Links
- Public license information: Public file; LMS

KLOO (1340 AM) is an commercial radio station licensed to Corvallis, Oregon, United States, broadcasting a talk format. The station is owned by Bicoastal Media, via subsidiary Bicoastal Media Licenses V, LLC, and features programming from Fox News Radio, Compass Media Networks, Premiere Networks and Westwood One. The studios and offices are on South Marion Street in Albany.

In additional to a standard analog transmission, KLOO is relayed low-power Corvallis translator K243CW (96.5 FM).

== History ==
The Pacific States Radio Company obtained a construction permit for a new full-time radio station with 250 watts on 1340 kHz on October 31, 1946. The station would be the first commercial outlet to serve Corvallis. The president of the company was J. C. Haley, head of the Brown & Haley Co., a candy manufacturer in Tacoma, Washington.

The station signed on August 23, 1947. Its offices and studios were located at 1221 S. 15th Street in Corvallis. Three months after signing on, Haley bought all of the shares he did not own in Pacific States Radio from various Corvallis-area investors, citing differences of opinion in the station's operation.

Haley's 1954 death prompted changes and caused a trio of Seattle men involved with KJR in that city to take an option on the station, No transaction panned out with that group, but Pacific States Radio was sold in 1956 to Portland appliance dealer John G. Severtson.

A year later, Severtson sold KRUL to Benton Broadcasters, Inc., a group of three men involved with other Oregon radio stations. After taking control, Benton Broadcasters changed KRUL's call sign to its present KLOO, for "locally owned and operated", on May 16. The new owners filed for and received federal approval to increase power to 1,000 watts on 1350 kHz; the change never came to pass, and instead Benton sold KLOO to the Paul H. Raymer Company of Chicago in 1960.

KLOO would get another new owner when KLOO, Inc., owned by the Houglum family of Eugene, completed its purchase of the station in 1964. It was the second attempt by Raymer to sell: a previous deal with the Mur-Rand-A Broadcasting Corporation had fallen apart. The new owners were able to increase the station's power to 1,000 watts after the FCC approved a two-year-old application in 1964. Houglum established himself as an on-air presence as well with his daily "Toast and Coffee" show; he also made an offer of $10,000 to anyone who could bring an extraterrestrial lifeform to the station, as he wanted "to bring all the UFO talk down to earth". January 1973 brought a simulcasting FM station, KLOO-FM at 106.1 MHz.

In late 1977, Houglum concluded arrangements to sell KLOO-AM-FM to Medford–based California–Oregon Broadcasting Inc., remaining on air to host his "Toast and Coffee" program, which did not end until he retired in 1987. During its ownership, California–Oregon pursued a new tower site and power increase for the FM station to maximize its facility. However, a split within the controlling Smullin family led to Donald E. Smullin becoming owner of the KLOO stations plus KPRB near Bend and KOTI television in Klamath Falls in 1981. By that time, KLOO AM was airing middle of the road music.

Smullin owned KLOO and the FM station, which had changed its call letters to KFAT, until he sold the pair in 1995 to Oregon Trail Productions of Broomfield, Colorado. Under Oregon Trail, the station adopted a sports talk format, which shifted to the present talk format in 1998 upon the purchase of KLOO by Jacor, which installed programs it syndicated such The Rush Limbaugh Show and the programs of Laura Schlesinger and Art Bell. Bicoastal Media purchased KLOO from Clear Channel Communications, Jacor's successor, in 2007 when the company purchased the former Clear Channel clusters in Medford, Eugene and Corvallis.
