= KUGN =

Radio station in Eugene, Oregon

Coordinates: 44°06′2.4″N 123°03′10.3″W

- Eugene, Oregon; United States
- Broadcast area: Eugene - Springfield - Willamette Valley
- Frequency: 590 kHz
- Branding: News Talk 590

Programming
- Format: Talk radio
- Affiliations: ABC News Radio; Bloomberg Radio; Premiere Networks; Westwood One

Ownership
- Owner: Cumulus Media; (Cumulus Licensing LLC)
- Sister stations: KUJZ, KZEL-FM, KNRQ, KEHK

History
- First air date: July 4, 1946
- Call sign meaning: "Eugene"

Technical information
- Licensing authority: FCC
- Facility ID: 12506
- Class: B
- Power: 5,000 watts
- Translator: 98.1 K251CY (Springfield)

Links
- Public license information: Public file; LMS
- Webcast: Listen live; Listen live; Listen live (via iHeartRadio)
- Website: kugn.com

KUGN (590 AM) is a commercial radio station, licensed to Eugene, Oregon, United States, and serves the Eugene-Springfield media market. Owned by Cumulus Media, it broadcasts a talk format. The studios and offices are on Executive Parkway. The transmitter is located off North Game Farm Road.

KUGN is also relayed over K251CY (98.1 FM), an FM translator.

== History ==
=== Early years ===
KUGN first signed on the air on July 4, 1946. It was the second radio station in Eugene, after KORE. The station was founded by C.H. Fisher of Portland. After some years, his children - Carl Fisher, Jane Whitbread, and Nancy Harrison - assumed daily operations of the station.

KUGN was originally affiliated with the ABC radio network, but switched to NBC in December 1952. In 1953, KUGN raised its power to 5,000 watts, to become the most powerful radio station in Oregon, outside the Portland metropolitan area. In 1979, KUGN began airing some Mutual Broadcasting System programming, including Monday Night Football and Larry King's popular late night talk show.

In 1972, Obie Advertising bought KUGN from the Fisher Family. Obie was headed by Brian Obie, a future mayor of Eugene. Obie Advertising sold KUGN to Dallas-based Media Corp. of America in 1987. Then in mid-1989, long-time employees Jim Torrey (also a future mayor of Eugene) and Chuck Chackel purchased KUGN for $4.2 million. The new company was called Combined Communications. Torrey sold his interest in the company in 1991.

=== Past personalities ===
During its first four decades, KUGN was best known for its eclectic, personable announcers. The careers of such veterans as Duke Young, Dick Cross, Dave Miller, Russ Doran, Skip Hathaway, Frank Ellington as “The Old Trader”, Webb Russell, Gordon Scott, Wendy Ray and Dale "Uncle Fuzzy" Reed spanned the period from the late 1950s to the 1970s. The station had the first traffic reports in the market in 1976 when Ken Strobeck did morning and afternoon drive-time reports in the "KUGN Traffic Rabbit," a Volkswagen Rabbit equipped with a radio telephone and portable transmitter. Tom Lichty ("Major Tom") took over the job in late 1976 when traffic reporting took flight, serving both as traffic reporter and pilot.

KUGN is remembered for its Morning Show, a "must hear" in the Eugene area throughout the 1970s, 1980s, and early 1990s. The Morning Show entertained listeners with features such as Wendy Ray's "Ball Score Boogie," conceptualized by Reed, the "Poet's Nook" starring Fred Webb as the high-buttoned poetry devotee "Charles," Lichty's traffic reports, and "Gridpute," a tongue-in-cheek Friday morning football preview featuring Ray and a clanking, cantankerous "computer." Ray and Webb also teamed up on the morning newscasts, twice hourly between 5:30 and 10 a.m. Host Dale Reed, known as "Uncle Fuzzy," knit it all together with his wry commentary and savvy music choices (adult contemporary music with a fair amount of jazz).

Ray retired from radio in March 1992. Reed and Webb continued until that November, but management chose not to renew their contracts. The station experimented with a few replacements, before settling on a morning news team of Ralph Steadman and Rick Little. Steadman exited in 1995 to make way for University of Oregon sportscaster Jerry Allen. Then in 2016, KUGN began carrying Armstrong & Getty, a syndicated morning show based at KSTE in Sacramento.

=== Changes in ownership ===
In 1996, the Federal Communications Commission changed radio station ownership rules to allow companies to own up to six stations in a market (see Telecommunications Act of 1996). Prior to 1996, companies could only own two FM and two AM stations per market.

Combined Communications took advantage of the new ownership rules and sold the station in 1996 to Deschutes Broadcasting for $7 million. Over the next three years, KUGN passed hands from Deschutes to Citadel Broadcasting to Marathon Media, and finally, to Cumulus Broadcasting. Cumulus also purchased five other stations in the Eugene area. The six stations have offices and studios at Cumulus headquarters on Executive Parkway.

=== "Home of the Ducks" ===
In 1959, KUGN became the first flagship station of the newly created University of Oregon sports radio network, with play-by-play announcer John Tasnady starting a three-season run as the football "Voice of the Ducks." Previously, KUGN was one of four Eugene stations to carry Oregon and Oregon State football games on the Tidewater Associated Oil Co. network.

KUGN news- and sportscaster Wendy Ray took the microphone in 1960 as the Ducks' basketball announcer, when KUGN got the broadcast rights to that sport from local rival KASH. When Tasnady retired from broadcasting prior to the 1962 football season, Ray stepped in as football announcer, and called both sports up through the 1969 Oregon-Oregon State "Civil War" football game. Color commentator Mike Guldager stepped in as play-by-play announcer for the season finale at Hawaii, and then announced Ducks basketball and football until 1973.

Ray returned to Oregon Ducks play-by-play for one season (1974–75) as football and basketball announcer. He also served as color commentator for new play-by-play announcer Warren Swain in the 1980 football season. Outside radio, Ray was the longtime public address announcer for Oregon track and field meets at Hayward Field. Other KUGN "voices" of University of Oregon sports were Bud Sobel (1973–74), Ralph Petti (football, 1975), Mike Stone (1975–80), Swain (1980–82), Bill Johnson of Portland network affiliate KXL (1982–84) and Hal Ramey (1984–87).

KUGN lost the broadcast rights to Duck sports in 1987, when the University of Oregon athletic department set up its own in-house radio network. The university put the network's flagship status up for bidding, and local rival KPNW won out over KUGN. During that time, KUGN became the flagship station for the Oregon State Beavers football radio network, outbidding Portland station KEX 1190 AM. Eight years later, KUGN regained the broadcast rights to Duck sports. Play-by-play announcer Jerry Allen, who began calling Ducks games in 1987, moved from KPNW to KUGN at that time. Today Ducks' broadcasts are shared with co-owned sports radio station KUJZ 95.3 FM.

== Programming ==
KUGN is the flagship radio station of the Oregon Sports Network. It broadcasts University of Oregon Ducks football and basketball games, which are simulcast on KUJZ.
