= KRKT-FM =

Radio station in Albany, Oregon

Coordinates: 44.646°N 123.271°W

- Albany, Oregon; United States
- Broadcast area: Albany–Corvallis–Lebanon, Salem, and Eugene–Springfield, Oregon (Willamette Valley)
- Frequency: 99.9 MHz
- Branding: 99.9 KRKT (pronounced as "Cricket")

Programming
- Format: Country

Ownership
- Owner: Bicoastal Media
- Sister stations: KDUK-FM, KEJO, KFLY, KLOO (AM), KLOO-FM, KODZ, KPNW, KTHH

History
- First air date: August 1, 1977
- Call sign meaning: "Cricket"

Technical information
- Licensing authority: FCC
- Facility ID: 39483
- Class: C0
- ERP: 100,000 watts
- HAAT: 326 meters (1,070 ft)
- Translators: 96.7 K244FG (Salem); 100.5 K263AF (Sweet Home)

Links
- Public license information: Public file; LMS
- Webcast: Listen Live

KRKT-FM (99.9 MHz) is a commercial country music radio station in Albany, Oregon, United States, broadcasting to the Albany–Corvallis–Lebanon, Salem, and Eugene–Springfield, Oregon areas, also known as the Willamette Valley area.

Previous logo

== Translators ==
KRKT-FM broadcasts on the following translators:

Call sign	Frequency	City of license	FID	ERP (W)	Class	FCC info
K244FG	96.7 FM	Salem, Oregon	39482	130	D	LMS
K263AF	100.5 FM	Sweet Home, Oregon	77274	250	D	LMS
