= KDUK-FM =

Contemporary hit radio station in Florence–Eugene, Oregon

- Florence, Oregon; United States
- Broadcast area: Eugene–Springfield, Oregon
- Frequency: 104.7 MHz
- Branding: 104.7 KDUK (pronounced "K-Duck")

Programming
- Format: Contemporary hit radio
- Affiliations: Compass Media Networks; Premiere Networks

Ownership
- Owner: Bicoastal Media
- Sister stations: KEJO, KFLY, KLOO, KLOO-FM, KODZ, KPNW, KRKT-FM, KTHH

History
- First air date: 1983
- Former call signs: KDUK (1983–1987); KLCX (1987–1993)
- Call sign meaning: The Oregon Duck, mascot for the University of Oregon

Technical information
- Licensing authority: FCC
- Facility ID: 54010
- Class: C
- ERP: 68,000 watts horizontal; 100,000 watts vertical
- HAAT: 707 meters (2,320 ft)
- Transmitter coordinates: 44.291°N 123.540°W

Links
- Public license information: Public file; LMS
- Webcast: Listen live

KDUK-FM (104.7 FM) is a commercial radio station licensed to Florence, Oregon, United States, and serving the Eugene–Springfield, Corvallis–Albany–Lebanon, and Salem areas of the Willamette Valley with a contemporary hit format.

== History ==
KDUK has spent the vast majority of its years as a CHR/Top 40 station. In 1983, KDUK signed on the air with a hot adult contemporary format as "K-Duck 105" before changing to classic rock “Classics 104.7” as KLCX in late 1987. KLCX (also known as "The X") was a classic rock station until early 1993, when 104.7 returned to pop music as CHR/Top 40, and the KDUK call letters. In 1993 (when the CHR/Top 40 format debuted), it was branded “Power 104.7 K-D-U-K” which evolved into its current branding; “104.7 K-Duck” by 1995.
