= KUKI (AM) =

- Ukiah, California; United States
- Broadcast area: Fort Bragg-Ukiah
- Frequency: 1400 kHz
- Branding: Greatest Hits on Earth

Programming
- Format: Classic hits

Ownership
- Owner: Bicoastal Media Licenses, LLC
- Sister stations: KDAC; KLLK; KUKI-FM

History
- First air date: October 1, 1950
- Last air date: September 2025
- Call sign meaning: Ukiah

Technical information
- Licensing authority: FCC
- Facility ID: 31619
- Class: C
- Power: 1,000 watts unlimited
- Transmitter coordinates: 39°10′5.6″N 123°12′50″W
- Translator: 96.3 K242AD (Ukiah)
- Repeaters: 1230 KDAC (Fort Bragg); 1250 KLLK (Willits)

Links
- Public license information: Public file; LMS
- Website: kuki.com

KUKI (1400 AM) was a radio station broadcasting a classic hits music format. Licensed to Ukiah, California, United States, the station served the Fort Bragg-Ukiah area. The station was owned by Bicoastal Media Licenses, LLC.

KUKI, along with KDAC in Fort Bragg, went silent for financial reasons in September 2025. The Federal Communications Commission cancelled the KUKI license on September 23, 2026.
