= KNND =

Radio station in Cottage Grove, Oregon

- Cottage Grove, Oregon; United States
- Frequency: 1400 kHz
- Branding: KNND AM 1400

Programming
- Format: Classic country

Ownership
- Owner: Cameron Reiten; (Reiten Communications, LLC)

History
- First air date: August 1953
- Former call signs: KCTG (1952–1953, CP); KSGA (1953–1954); KOMB (1954–1960)

Technical information
- Licensing authority: FCC
- Facility ID: 66972
- Class: C
- Power: 950 watts (unlimited)
- Transmitter coordinates: 43°45′43″N 123°04′42″W
- Translator: 99.7 K259DE (Cottage Grove)

Links
- Public license information: Public file; LMS
- Website: knnd.com

KNND (1400 AM) is a radio station licensed to Cottage Grove, Oregon, United States, broadcasting a classic country format. The station, which began broadcasting in 1953, is currently owned by Cameron Reiten, through licensee Reiten Communications, LLC.

== History ==
=== Beginnings ===
The construction permit for the station was issued by the Federal Communications Commission to the Coast Fork Broadcasting Company in 1952. The construction permit originally bore the call letters KCTG, but they were changed to KSGA before going on air on July 26, 1953. The station was authorized to broadcast with 250 watts of power on a frequency of 1400 kHz and under the leadership of company president W. Gordon Allen. (It was the second station Allen had started in less than a year with those call letters; he had sold the first, in Redmond, in March 1953 and had the KSGA call letters transferred to what was KCTG.)

Coast Fork Broadcasting was sold to Orlo M. and Thelma Bagley in a deal that was consummated on June 1, 1954. The new owners had the FCC change the call sign again, this time to KOMB.

The Bagleys changed the name of the license holding company to Radio Station KOMB, Inc., in 1956, and Milton Viken joined the staff as the station's chief engineer. In 1959, the owners applied for a new call sign and the station was assigned KNND by the FCC on August 26, 1960.

=== 1960s ===
The company, which still retained the Radio Station KOMB, Inc. name, was sold to Peter Ryan in 1960. In 1962, Ryan changed the name of the company to Radio Station KNND, Inc., to match the new call letters. That same year, the FCC issued the station a new construction permit to upgrade its daytime signal to 1,000 watts while broadcasting with 250 watts of power at night. KNND would begin broadcasting at the newly authorized power levels in 1963.

Chief engineer Milton A. Viken purchased the station and, by 1966, had changed the name of the company to Radio Station KNND & KRKT, Inc., to reflect its duopoly status. Also in 1966, the station was playing as much as 12 hours of country & western music each week. Reflecting the growth of the company, Viken transferred the broadcast license for KNND to the Interstate Broadcasting Company in 1968. KNND aired Major League Baseball games as an affiliate of the Seattle Pilots during their only year of existence, 1969, before the team went bankrupt and was reborn in 1970 as the Milwaukee Brewers.

=== 1970s ===
In 1972, Interstate Broadcasting sold the station to Keith L. and Eleanor B. Stiles, a married couple. The Stiles programmed a mix of country & western and contemporary music. This ownership would prove short-lived as on April 1, 1974, the station was sold to KTOB, Inc., who brought in a middle of the road music format. This too was a short-term change as the station was sold again, this time to Thornton Pfleger, Inc., in a transaction consummated on December 1, 1976. The new owners maintained the MOR format through the end of the 1970s.

=== 1980s and beyond ===
In October 1988, David R. Pfleger and Mary T. Pfleger announced an agreement to sell KNND license holder Thornton Pfleger, Inc., to Robert L. O'Renick and Diane C. O'Renick. The deal was approved by the FCC on November 28, 1988, and the transaction was consummated on December 3, 1988.

In October 1998, the FCC granted KNND a new construction permit to change the location of its transmitter, make changes to its antenna system, and reduce the power of both its daytime and nighttime signals to 950 watts.

KNND "America's Best Country" logo

In January 2005, Thornton Pfleger, Inc., reached an agreement to sell this station to Paul Henry Schwartzberg doing business as Schwartzberg Communications, Inc., for a reported cash price of $300,000. The deal was approved by the FCC on March 11, 2005, and the transaction was consummated on May 2, 2005.

At the time of the sale, KNND broadcast a country music format. The station flipped from its former country music format to a syndicated oldies music format from ABC Radio (now known as Citadel Media) in October 2007. On January 1, 2014, KNND changed their format to classic country.

Schwartzberg Communications sold KNND to Reiten Communications, LLC, effective December 23, 2014, at a price of $173,250.

== Programming ==
=== Specialty programming ===
Specialty weekday programming on KNND includes a Monday mid-day bluegrass music block called Into the Blue with Terry Herd, a Thursday mid-day classic country music program known as The Round-Up Classic Country and Western Hoe-Down, a Friday evening classic rock block called Dig It. Weekend specialty programming includes a Saturday-morning one-hour program for horse enthusiasts called The Horse Show, a two-hour Saturday-morning "Polka Party" hosted by John Klobas, three hours of cowboy poetry and western music each Sunday afternoon on The Cowboy Culture Center with Dallas McCord, and a three-hour Gospel music show called Sunday Morning Light.

=== Talk and sports programming ===
In addition to its music programming, KNND airs a weekday community call-in talk program called The Beeper Show, followed by an hour-long tradio program called Swap 'n' Shop. KNND also broadcasts high school football games and select other sporting events featuring the Cottage Grove High School Lions as a member of the Table Rock Sports Network. KNND is also a member of the Oregon State University Beavers football radio network.

== Awards and honors ==
KNND on-air personality and The Cowboy Culture Center host Dallas McCord won the 2007 Will Rogers Award, named for humorist Will Rogers, as best Disc Jockey, Secondary Market, from the Academy of Western Artists. The Will Rogers Awards honor "the best and brightest in all facets of contemporary cowboy heritage" and recognize "outstanding talent, craftsmanship, and artistry in those who exemplify the cowboy way of life".

== Translator ==
KNND is also broadcast on the following translator:

Call sign	Frequency	City of license	FID	ERP (W)	Class	FCC info
K259DE	99.7 FM	Cottage Grove, Oregon	202475	200	D	LMS
