= KXPD (AM) =

- Tigard, Oregon; United States
- Broadcast area: Portland metropolitan area, Oregon
- Frequency: 1040 kHz (HD Radio)
- Branding: Slavic Family Radio

Programming
- Language: Russian
- Format: Slavic/English Programming

Ownership
- Owner: Irina Baranova; (Pin Investments, Inc.)

History
- First air date: June 28, 1993
- Former call signs: KEZF (1989–1997); KLVP (1997); KSKD (1997); KLVP (1997–2006)
- Call sign meaning: "La X Portland" (previous format)

Technical information
- Licensing authority: FCC
- Facility ID: 18859
- Class: D
- Power: 2,200 watts (day); 200 watts (night)
- Transmitter coordinates: 45°28′26″N 122°39′33″W

Links
- Public license information: Public file; LMS

KXPD (1040 AM) is a commercial radio station licensed to Tigard, Oregon, United States, and serving the Portland metropolitan area. It airs Russian language programming and is currently owned by Irina Baranova, through licensee PIN Investments, Inc. KXPD is part of the Slavic Family Radio Network.

== History ==
=== K-LOVE ===
More than five years after applying in August 1983, Dale A. Owens received the original construction permit for a new 250 watt AM station. The permit was provided by the Federal Communications Commission on March 23, 1989. The new station was assigned the call letters KEZF by the FCC in 1989.

Before it was on the air, the permit was sold to a religious broadcaster. In March 1990, Dale A. Owens reached an agreement to sell the permit for this still-under construction station to the Educational Media Foundation. EMF owns hundreds of stations around the U.S. featuring Christian radio formats "K-LOVE" and "Air1." The deal was approved by the FCC on April 25, 1990, and the transaction was consummated on June 13, 1990.

The new owners filed an application with the FCC in July 1992 to change the transmitter location, increase the station's signal daytime power to 2,200 watts, and lower the nighttime power to 200 watts. The FCC granted authorization for these changes to the construction permit on December 22, 1992. After several extensions, KEZF finally received its license to cover from the FCC on July 16, 1993.

Eleven days after receiving the license, the Educational Media Foundation applied to the FCC for a waiver of its "main studio rule" to allow the station to be programmed from Sacramento, California, and operated as a non-commercial educational radio station. After a second application in April 1996, the FCC granted this request on March 4, 1997.

EMF intended to make the station part of its K-LOVE Radio Network. EMF applied to the FCC for a new [call sign and granted KLVP on February 10, 1997. Those call letters refer to K-Love Portland. The call sign was changed again to KSKD on October 20, 1997, before returning to KLVP on December 22, 1997, where it would remain until the station was sold in 2006.

=== La X 1040 ===
"La X" branding

On April 30, 2006, the Educational Media Foundation reached an agreement to sell this station to Churchill Communications, LLC, for a reported total price of $1.8 million. The deal was approved by the FCC on July 24, 2006, and the transaction was consummated on July 31, 2006. The new owners had the FCC assign the station new call sign KXPD on July 31, 2006. On the same day, the FCC authorized the station to resume operations as a commercial radio station and licensed KXPD to operate through at least February 1, 2014.

KXPD broadcast a mixed Regional Mexican music and Spanish-language talk radio format branded as "La X 1040". Weekday programs on "La X" included a morning show called "Nelson, Tere y el Morrillo", a mid-day show hosted by Fernando Sobrevilla, and afternoon drive is hosted by El Capitan Hernandez. These programs were aired in conjunction with sister station KXOR (660 AM) in Eugene, Oregon.

In 2007 and 2008, the station aired select Oregon State Beavers football and baseball games in Spanish. In 2008, KXPD broadcast the home games of the Portland Timbers, a professional soccer team in the USL First Division. The broadcasts included a 25-minute pre-game show and play-by-play by Fernando Sobrevilla.

=== Silent ===
On December 30, 2009, KXPD went off the air citing "substantial decreases in its revenue flow" over the past three years. In its application to the FCC for special temporary authority to remain silent, the station's license holder claimed that "losses have reached the point that the station no longer generates sufficient funds to pay operating expenses" and that the company is seeking to either sell the station or refinance and return to operation. The FCC granted the station authority to remain silent on March 4, 2010. This temporary authorization was scheduled to expire on September 4, 2010.

The FCC granted an extension of this authority until December 30, 2010, after which the station would have been off the air for a full year and the station's license subject to involuntary forfeiture. KXPD returned to the air full-time on December 29, 2010.

=== Old Time Radio and Russian programming ===
The station began broadcasting full-time "Old Time Radio" content featuring comedy, mystery, and adventure programs from the 1930s through 1960s. Between some episodes, KXPD broadcast brief, pre-recorded station identification messages. On January 31, 2011, KXPD went silent again. KXPD returned to the air again on June 9, 2011, with old-time radio programs and then went silent again on June 12, 2011. As of July 2, 2011, KXPD returned with Chinese language programming.

In 2020, it was acquired by PIN Investments, Inc., to air Russian language programming from the Slavic Family Network.
