= KEJO =

Radio station in Corvallis, Oregon

- Corvallis, Oregon; United States
- Frequency: 1240 kHz
- Branding: 1240 Joe Radio

Programming
- Format: Sports
- Affiliations: Fox Sports Radio; Westwood One Sports; Corvallis Knights; Oregon State Beavers; Seattle Mariners

Ownership
- Owner: Bicoastal Media; (Bicoastal Media Licenses V, LLC)
- Sister stations: KDUK-FM, KFLY, KLOO, KLOO-FM, KODZ, KPNW, KRKT-FM, KTHH

History
- First air date: August 1955
- Former call signs: KCOV (1955–1958); KFLY (1958–1994)
- Call sign meaning: named for Emily Jo, the late daughter of a now-former owner

Technical information
- Licensing authority: FCC
- Facility ID: 39573
- Class: C
- Power: 1,000 watts
- Transmitter coordinates: 44°35′38″N 123°13′30″W
- Translator: 93.7 K229DI (Corvallis)

Links
- Public license information: Public file; LMS
- Webcast: Listen live

KEJO (1240 AM, "1240 Joe Radio") is a commercial radio station licensed to Corvallis, Oregon, United States, airing a sports format. It is owned by Bicoastal Media with the broadcast license held by Bicoastal Media Licenses V, LLC. The studios are on Marion Street SE in Albany.

KEJO is also heard over low-power FM translator K229DI at 93.7 MHz.

== History ==
The Midland Broadcasting Company was granted a construction permit in 1953 to build a new AM radio station broadcasting with 250 watts of power on a frequency of 1240 kHz. The stations signed on the air in August 1955 as KCOV. Donald McCormick served as president of Midland Broadcasting and Frank Flynn as the general manager of the station.

Dave Hoss acquired control of Midland Broadcasting in late February 1958. He applied to the FCC for new call letters for the station and was granted KFLY.

Radio Broadcasters, Inc., acquired KFLY in January 1963. The Federal Communications Commission granted KFLY authorization a few months later to increase its daytime signal strength to 1,000 watts while maintaining the nighttime signal power of 250 watts. In October 1966, KFLY-FM (101.5 FM) was launched as an FM sister station, simulcasting duplicating a portion of the AM station's programming and extending its effective coverage area. KFLY-FM later switched to a separate format of easy listening and classical music.

Ted Jackson's Radio Corvallis, Inc., bought KFLY in March 1971. The station aired a Top 40 music format throughout the 1970s. It carried news from the ABC Contemporary Radio Network. KFLY was acquired by the Madgekal Broadcasting Company in August 1977 and the Top 40 format was maintained. Mario Pastega, the owner of Madgekal Broadcasting, also owned the local Pepsi-Cola bottling plant.

After more than 35 years of broadcasting as KFLY, the station was assigned the current KEJO call letters by the FCC on January 31, 1994. Pastega chose the new call sign as a tribute to his daughter, Emily Jo, who died as a young adult.

In June 1999, Madgekal Broadcasting, Inc., reached an agreement to sell this station to Jacor Communications. The deal was approved by the FCC on August 24, 1999, and the transaction was consummated on September 1, 1999. After Jacor's merger with Clear Channel Communications was completed, the company made application with the FCC in December 2000 to transfer the broadcast license for KEJO to Clear Channel subsidiary Citicasters Licenses, Inc. The transfer was approved by the FCC on January 4, 2001, and the transaction was consummated on June 5, 2001.

KEJO was granted a construction permit to upgrade to 1,000 watt operation both day and night in November 2001. The station received its license to cover this change on September 25, 2003.

In May 2007, Clear Channel Communications, through its Citicasters Licenses, LP, subsidiary, announced an agreement to sell this station to Bicoastal Media subsidiary Bicoastal Willamette Valley, LLC. It was part of a 14-station deal valued at $37 million.

The sale was approved by the FCC on July 2, 2007, and the transaction was consummated on October 1, 2007. As part of an internal corporate reorganization in October 2007, Bicoastal Willamette Valley, LLC, applied to transfer the broadcast license for KEJO to Bicoastal Media Licenses V, LLC. The transfer was approved by the FCC on October 29, 2007.

== Programming ==
=== Sports talk ===
KEJO carries national shows from Fox Sports Radio and Westwood One Sports. Local and regional weekday programs on KEJO include Joe Beaver Show with the Oregon State Beavers radio voices, Mike Parker & Jon Warren.

=== Live sports events ===
KEJO airs local high school football games plus Oregon State Beavers football, men's basketball, and baseball as part of the Beaver Sports Radio Network. Beginning with the 2009 season, KEJO is the broadcast home of the Corvallis Knights, a West Coast League minor league baseball team. During the baseball season, KEJO is also an affiliate of the Seattle Mariners Radio Network.
