= KODZ =

Coordinates: 44.116°N 123.000°W

- Eugene, Oregon; United States
- Broadcast area: Eugene-Springfield
- Frequency: 99.1 MHz
- Branding: 99.1 The Beat

Programming
- Format: Rhythmic 1990s/2000s hits
- Affiliations: Westwood One

Ownership
- Owner: Bicoastal Media; (Bicoastal Media Licenses V, LLC)
- Sister stations: KDUK-FM; KEJO; KFLY; KLOO; KLOO-FM; KPNW; KRKT-FM; KTHH

History
- First air date: November 1968 (as KPNW-FM)
- Former call signs: KPNW-FM (1968–1994)
- Call sign meaning: Refers to previous oldies format

Technical information
- Licensing authority: FCC
- Facility ID: 40845
- Class: C
- ERP: 100,000 watts
- HAAT: 497 meters (1,631 ft)
- Translator: 95.3 K237EC (Florence)

Links
- Public license information: Public file; LMS
- Webcast: Listen live

KODZ (99.1 FM "99.1 The Beat") is a commercial radio station in Eugene, Oregon, broadcasting to the Eugene-Springfield radio market. The station is owned by Bicoastal Media and airs a rhythmic 1990s/2000s hits radio format.

The studios and offices are on River Valley Road in Springfield. The transmitter is off Hill Road north of Springfield, amid towers for other Eugene-area FM and TV stations. KODZ is also heard on an FM translator station in Florence, K237EC 95.3 MHz.

== History ==
The station signed on the air in November 1968 as KPNW-FM. It was owned by Pacific Northwest Broadcasting, along with KPNW (1120 AM). KPNW-FM carried an automated beautiful music format, featuring 15 minute sweeps of mostly instrumental cover versions of pop songs, Broadway and Hollywood show tunes.

Over time, KPNW-FM decreased the instrumentals and added more soft vocals, with DJs replacing the automation during some hours. In the mid-1980s, it transitioned to a soft adult contemporary sound, branded as "Lite 99.1".

In 1991, KPNW-AM-FM were bought by McCoy Broadcasting for $4 million. In 1994, McCoy Broadcasting switched KPNW-FM to oldies. To reflect the new format, it changed its call sign to KODZ.

KODZ and KPNW were acquired by Clear Channel Communications in 2000. Clear Channel began to shift the playlist from oldies of the late 1950s, 1960s, and 1970s to classic hits of the 1970s and 1980s.

Current owner Bicoastal Media acquired KODZ and KPNW in 2007. Under Bicoastal Media's ownership, KODZ added some 1990s titles and limited the 1970s songs. During this period, KODZ played all-Christmas music for part of November and December, and carried the syndicated Bob & Sheri morning drive time show.

On March 25, 2023, KODZ changed its format from classic hits to rhythmic 1990s-2000s hits, branded as "99.1 The Beat".

== Translators ==
KODZ broadcasts on the following translator:

Call sign	Frequency	City of license	FID	ERP (W)	Class	FCC info
K237EC	95.3 FM	Florence, Oregon	51214	250	D	LMS
