= KMGE =

Radio station in Eugene, Oregon

- Eugene, Oregon; United States
- Broadcast area: Eugene-Springfield
- Frequency: 94.5 MHz
- Branding: 94-5 Mix FM

Programming
- Format: Adult contemporary
- Affiliations: Premiere Networks

Ownership
- Owner: McKenzie River Broadcasting Company, Inc.
- Sister stations: KEUG, KKNU

History
- First air date: July 30, 1962
- Former call signs: KBMC (1962–1987)
- Call sign meaning: "Magic Eugene" (previous branding)

Technical information
- Licensing authority: FCC
- Facility ID: 40885
- Class: C1
- ERP: 49,000 watts (horiz.); 21,000 watts (vert.)
- HAAT: 396 meters (1,299 ft)
- Transmitter coordinates: 44°0′4″N 123°6′45″W
- Translators: 93.9 K230AD (Cottage Grove); 100.9 K265CZ (Oakridge)

Links
- Public license information: Public file; LMS
- Webcast: Listen live
- Website: 945mixfm.com

KMGE (94.5 FM) is a commercial radio station licensed to Eugene, Oregon, United States, serving the Eugene-Springfield market. It is owned by McKenzie River Broadcasting and calls itself "94-5 Mix FM." KMGE broadcasts an adult contemporary format.

== History ==
On July 30, 1962, the station signed on as KBMC. It was owned by the Milan Corp. It originally transmitted with an effective radiated power of 3.4 kilowatts. KBMC was acquired in October 1965 by Good Shepherd Broadcasting, Inc. Good Shepherd aired a Christian radio format.

Good Shepherd Broadcasting, Inc., made a deal to transfer the broadcast license for KBMC to the Inspirational Broadcasting Corporation in 1978. Under the Inspirational Broadcasting Corporation's ownership, KBMC continued to broadcast a religious radio format.

In September 1986, Inspirational Broadcasting Corp. reached an agreement to sell the station to McKenzie River Broadcasting Company, Inc. The deal was approved by the Federal Communications Commission (FCC) on October 29, 1986, and the transaction was consummated on December 18, 1986. The new owners had the FCC change the station's call letters to KMGE on January 6, 1987.

In early 1987, KMGE launched with a well-researched Adult Contemporary format branded as “Magic 94” which became "Magic 94.5" by 1999. The station used the slogan “Today’s Hits and Yesterday’s Favorites.”

In 2008, KMGE rebranded as “94-5 Mix FM” with a slightly more upbeat Adult Contemporary presentation.

== Awards and honors ==
KMGE was recognized by the Oregon Association of Broadcasters in 2001 as a runner-up for Best Commercial Spot Announcement-Radio and both winner and runner-up in the Best Commercial Promotional Campaign for a Client-Radio category.

== Translators ==
KMGE programming is also carried on multiple broadcast translator stations to extend or improve the coverage area of the station.

Call sign	Frequency	City of license	FID	ERP (W)	Class	FCC info
K230AD	93.9 FM	Cottage Grove, Oregon	40891	250	D	LMS
K265CZ	100.9 FM	Oakridge, Oregon	40888	120	D	LMS
