= KEUG =

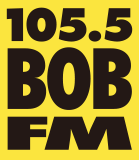
- Veneta, Oregon; United States
- Broadcast area: Eugene-Springfield metropolitan area
- Frequency: 105.5 MHz
- Branding: 105.5 Bob FM

Programming
- Format: Adult hits

Ownership
- Owner: McKenzie River Broadcasting
- Sister stations: KKNU, KMGE

History
- First air date: 1998
- Call sign meaning: Eugene

Technical information
- Licensing authority: FCC
- Facility ID: 60358
- Class: C3
- ERP: 2,800 watts
- HAAT: 303 meters (994 ft)
- Transmitter coordinates: 44.00261°N 123.11314°W
- Translator: 103.3 K277CT (Cottage Grove)

Links
- Public license information: Public file; LMS
- Webcast: Listen live
- Website: 1055bobfm.com

KEUG (105.5 FM) is a commercial radio station licensed to Veneta, Oregon, United States, and serving the Eugene-Springfield metropolitan area. Owned by McKenzie River Broadcasting, it airs an adult hits format known as "105.5 BOB FM". The studios and offices are on Country Club Road in Eugene.

KEUG's transmitter is sited on Blanton Heights Road in Eugene. It also broadcasts on a low-power FM translator, K277CT in Cottage Grove at 103.3 MHz.

== History ==
Originally filed under ownership of Signal Communications (P.O. box in Portland), KEUG first signed on the air in 1998 as a class A with its transmitter site in Cottage Grove. It was branded as "Lite FM" with the Jones satellite-fed AC format. In 2001, KEUG became "G105.5" with a locally-programmed Soft AC/Oldies format. In 2003, the format moved to a gold-based Hot AC, and then, AAA (World Class Rock, G105.5) by the end of the year. The current owner, McKenzie River Broadcasting, acquired the station on January 28, 2004 for $1.02 million. KEUG's city of license was changed from Cottage Grove to Veneta, while its transmitter site was moved to Eugene's Blanton Heights. In mid-March of 2004, after a brief period of silence, KEUG was relaunched in Eugene as "105-5 Bob FM" with its automated Adult Hits format.
