= KPNW (AM) =

News/talk radio station in Eugene, Oregon

- Eugene, Oregon; United States
- Broadcast area: Eugene-Springfield
- Frequency: 1120 kHz
- Branding: Newsradio 1120 and 93.7

Programming
- Format: Talk radio
- Affiliations: Fox News Radio; Compass Media Networks; Premiere Networks; Radio America; Westwood One

Ownership
- Owner: Bicoastal Media; (Bicoastal Media Licenses V, LLC)
- Sister stations: KDUK-FM; KEJO; KFLY; KLOO; KLOO-FM; KODZ; KRKT-FM; KTHH

History
- First air date: February 12, 1962
- Former call signs: KPIR (1962–1967)
- Former frequencies: 1500 kHz (1962–1969)
- Call sign meaning: Pacific Northwest

Technical information
- Licensing authority: FCC
- Facility ID: 40846
- Class: B
- Power: 50,000 watts
- Transmitter coordinates: 43°57′23.45″N 123°2′14.3″W
- Translator: 93.7 K229DC (Eugene)

Links
- Public license information: Public file; LMS
- Webcast: Listen live

KPNW (1120 AM) is a commercial radio station licensed to Eugene, Oregon, United States, and serving the Eugene-Springfield area. Owned by Bicoastal Media, it airs a talk radio format known as "Newsradio 1120 and 93.7". The studios and offices are on Valley River Drive in Eugene. KPNW and Portland's KOPB-FM are Oregon's primary entry point for the Emergency Alert System.

KPNW's transmitter is sited on Hideaway Hills in Creswell. KPNW is also heard in Eugene, Springfield and adjacent communities on low-power FM translator K229DC at 93.7 MHz.

== History ==
The station signed on the air on February 12, 1962. The original call sign was KPIR and it broadcast on 1500 kHz. KPIR was a daytimer station, powered at 10,000 watts using a nondirectional antenna but required to go off the air at night.

The call sign was changed to KPNW on September 25, 1967. Shortly afterward, the station's owner, Emerald Broadcasting Corporation, changed its name to Pacific Northwest Broadcasting Corporation.

For most of the 1960s and 1970s, KPNW had a middle of the road format, with popular adult music, news and sports. It was a network affiliate of ABC Radio. In 1968, it added a sister station, KPNW-FM 99.1. At first, the two stations mostly simulcast their programming, but KPNW-FM eventually had its own format of beautiful music. Today, it is KODZ.

In May 1969, KPNW moved to the current 1120 kHz frequency. It increased power to 50,000 watts and began using a directional antenna. The directional signal is necessary to avoid causing interference to KMOX in St. Louis, which is the dominant Class A station on the same frequency. At 50,000 watts full-time, KPNW is the most powerful AM station on the West Coast between San Francisco and Portland.

== Programming ==
Bill Lundun and Gerry Snyder host the station's local morning show; nationally syndicated conservative talk programs comprise the remainder of the schedule, including The Lars Larson Show (Larson was a one-time news intern at KPNW).

== Translator ==
KPNW also broadcasts on the following translator:

Broadcast translator for KPNW
Call sign	Frequency	City of license	FID	ERP (W)	Class	Transmitter coordinates	FCC info
K229DC	93.7 FM	Eugene, Oregon	155834	250 vertical	D	44°0′6.4″N 123°6′51.3″W	LMS
