= KXOR (AM) =

- Junction City, Oregon; United States
- Broadcast area: Eugene, Oregon
- Frequency: 660 kHz
- Branding: Radio Zion

Programming
- Language: Spanish
- Format: Christian

Ownership
- Owner: Iglesia de Cristo Ministerio Llamada Final, Inc.

History
- Former call signs: KZTU (1991–2004)

Technical information
- Licensing authority: FCC
- Facility ID: 31037
- Class: D
- Power: 10,000 watts (day); 75 watts (night)
- Transmitter coordinates: 44°12′36″N 123°10′56″W

Links
- Public license information: Public file; LMS
- Webcast: Listen live
- Website: radiozion.net

KXOR (660 AM, "Radio Zion") is a commercial radio station licensed to Junction City, Oregon, United States, and serving the greater Eugene, Oregon, area. The station, established as KZTU in 1991, is owned by Iglesia de Cristo Ministerio Llamada Final, Inc. and broadcasts a Spanish-language Christian format .

== History ==
The station was assigned the call sign KZTU on August 23, 1991. On August 12, 2004, the station changed its call sign to the current KXOR.

On December 30, 2009, KXOR went off the air citing "substantial decreases in its revenue flow" over the past three years. In its application to the FCC for special temporary authority to remain silent, the station's license holder claimed that "losses have reached the point that the station no longer generates sufficient funds to pay operating expenses" and that the company is seeking to either sell the station or refinance and return to operation. The FCC granted the station authority to remain silent on March 4, 2010.

Former branding

Until going dark on December 30, 2009, KXOR broadcast a mixed Regional Mexican music and Spanish-language talk radio format branded as "La X 660" to the Eugene, Oregon, area. This programming was aired in conjunction with sister station KXPD (1040 AM) in Portland, Oregon. In September 2010, the station filed for an extension of this authority but the application was dismissed as moot on October 25, 2010. The station returned to the air on October 18, 2010, as a Regional Mexican station with the "La Ke Buena" branding.

In December 2011, Churchill Media, LLC, applied to the FCC to transfer KXOR and sister station KLZS to "Arlie & Company". Both companies are wholly owned by Suzanne K. Arlie and the transfer was made as a "business reorganization". The FCC approved the move on December 29, 2011, and formal consummation of the transaction took place the same day.

In February 2012, Arlie & Company reached an agreement to sell KXOR to Zion Multimedia (Otto R. Azurdia, president) for $548,100 through their Zion Multimedia Oregon Corporation holding company. The deal gained FCC approval on April 2, 2012, and was formally consummated on April 17, 2012.

Zion Multimedia sold KXOR to Iglesia de Cristo Ministerio Llamada Final, Inc. in a transaction that was consummated on May 7, 2015. The consideration for the purchase was settlement of a $280,000 debt outstanding between the parties.
