= KUKI-FM =

Coordinates: 39.326°N 123.271°W

- Ukiah, California; United States
- Frequency: 103.3 MHz
- Branding: KUKI 103.3

Programming
- Language: English
- Format: Country

Ownership
- Owner: Bicoastal Media Licenses, LLC
- Sister stations: KLLK

History
- First air date: October 16, 1974 (as KALF)
- Former call signs: KALF (1974–1980); KIAH (1980–1989); KUKY (February–August 1989)

Technical information
- Licensing authority: FCC
- Facility ID: 31620
- Class: B
- ERP: 2,900 watts
- HAAT: 542 meters (1,778 ft)
- Translators: 100.9 K265DB (Fort Bragg); 107.1 K296ES (Lakeport)

Links
- Public license information: Public file; LMS
- Webcast: Listen live
- Website: kukifm.com

KUKI-FM (103.3 FM) is a radio station that broadcasts a country music format to Ukiah, California.
