= KWAX =

Classical music station in Eugene, Oregon

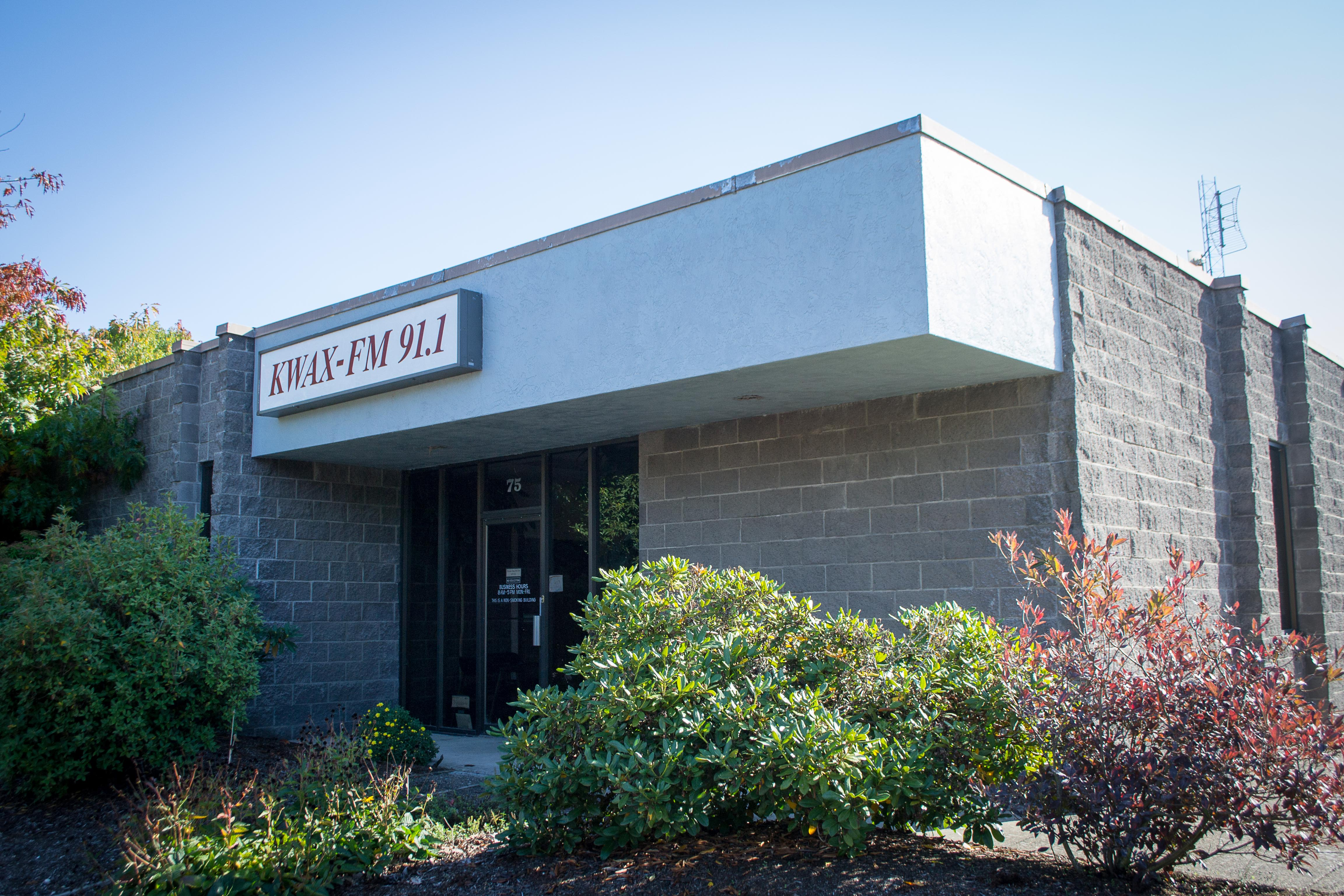
- KWAX's studios in Eugene, Oregon
- Eugene, Oregon; United States
- Broadcast area: Eugene-Springfield, Oregon
- Frequency: 91.1 MHz
- Branding: KWAX FM 91.1

Programming
- Format: Classical

Ownership
- Owner: University of Oregon

History
- First air date: 1951
- Call sign meaning: Pronounced "Quacks", referencing the Oregon Ducks, and "wax", slang for a phonograph record

Technical information
- Licensing authority: FCC
- Facility ID: 62413
- Class: C1
- ERP: 21,500 watts (horiz.); 12,500 watts (vert.)
- HAAT: 370 meters (1,210 ft)
- Translator: See below

Links
- Public license information: Public file; LMS
- Webcast: Listen live
- Website: kwax.com

KWAX (91.1 FM) is a non-commercial classical music radio station in Eugene, Oregon, broadcasting to the Eugene-Springfield, Oregon area. The station is a listener supported service of the University of Oregon. Some programming is spoken word: Episodes of My Word! and My Music were broadcast Sunday afternoons, until their discontinuation.

== History ==
KWAX started out in the late 1950s as a student managed and operated FM station, with studios and transmitter on the top floor of Villard Hall. The initial transmitter was 10 watts, and hours of operation were somewhat irregular. In 1966, a local FM station gave the university their old 250-watt transmitter when they upgraded.

== Repeaters and Translators ==
KWAX is simulcast on the following stations and translators:

- 88.5 FM in Redmond, Oregon (KWRX)
- 91.5 FM in Florence, Oregon (KWVZ )

Broadcast translators for KWAX
Call sign	Frequency	City of license	FID	ERP (W)	HAAT	Class	Transmitter coordinates	FCC info
K215ED	90.9 FM	Sunriver, Oregon	50617	50	90.4 m (297 ft)	D	43°52′25.4″N 121°30′18.1″W	LMS
K217FZ	91.3 FM	Newport, Oregon	50618	240	129.22 m (424 ft)	D	44°38′39.4″N 124°0′54.4″W	LMS
K225BF	92.9 FM	Turner, OR	63024	23	294 m (965 ft)	D	44°51′17.4″N 123°7′19.3″W	LMS
K225CC	92.9 FM	Corvallis, Oregon	156668	15.5	313.22 m (1,028 ft)	D	44°38′24.4″N 123°16′29.4″W	LMS
K250BK	97.9 FM	Roseburg, Oregon	17414	190	158.9 m (521 ft)	D	43°12′7.4″N 123°22′58.3″W	LMS
K255CA	98.9 FM	Bend, Oregon	36520	92	161.9 m (531 ft)	D	44°4′39.4″N 121°19′53.1″W	LMS
K270BJ	101.9 FM	Cottage Grove, Oregon	36521	250	98.1 m (322 ft)	D	43°46′40.4″N 123°2′36.3″W	LMS
K287BF	105.3 FM	Glide, Oregon	17417	10	759 m (2,490 ft)	D	43°22′15.8″N 123°3′50.9″W	LMS
