= KUJZ =

- Creswell, Oregon; United States
- Broadcast area: Eugene-Springfield, Oregon
- Frequency: 95.3 MHz
- Branding: Sports Radio, 95.3 The Score

Programming
- Format: Sports
- Affiliations: Westwood One Sports; BetQL Network

Ownership
- Owner: Cumulus Media; (Cumulus Licensing LLC)
- Sister stations: KEHK; KNRQ; KUGN; KZEL-FM

History
- First air date: 1985
- Former call signs: KZAM-FM (1985–1990); KAVE (1990–1993); KZZK-FM (1993–1995); KNRQ-FM (1995–2001); KKTT (2001)
- Call sign meaning: Eugene's Smooth Jazz (previous format)

Technical information
- Licensing authority: FCC
- Facility ID: 30650
- Class: C3
- ERP: 1,750 watts
- HAAT: 366 meters (1,201 ft)
- Transmitter coordinates: 44.001°N 123.114°W

Links
- Public license information: Public file; LMS
- Webcast: Listen live; Listen live; Listen live (via iHeartRadio)
- Website: www.953thescore.com

KUJZ (95.3 FM, "Sports Radio, 95.3 The Score") is a commercial radio station licensed to Creswell, Oregon, United States, and serving the Eugene-Springfield radio market. The station is owned by Cumulus Media and the broadcast license is held by Cumulus Licensing LLC. It airs a sports format, with studios and offices on Executive Parkway in Eugene.

KUJZ's transmitter is sited on Blanton Road in Eugene.

== History ==
The station signed on the air in 1985 as KZAM-FM. It had an adult album alternative (AAA) format. In late 1988, KZAM-FM changed to a satellite-fed "Pure Gold" oldies format.

In 1990, new owners changed the call letters to KAVE and started a new adult album alternative format as "95-3 The KAVE". In 1993, the format changed to the satellite-fed "Z-Rock", a hard rock format simulcasting with AM 1320 KZZK; the call letters were changed to KZZK-FM. In 1995, the format changed to alternative rock as "New Rock 95-3 NRQ" with new call letters KNRQ-FM.

In 2001, after KNRQ's format and call letters were moved to 97.9 KKTT, 95.3 became smooth jazz as KUJZ. In 2004, it changed to country music as “95-3 The Moose”. The station was automated with no DJs. In 2009, KUJZ dropped country and picked up AM 1320 "The Score" KSCR's sports radio format. 1320 KSCR has since gone dark.

== Programming ==
KUJZ carries programming from Westwood One Sports and BetQL Network most of the day. A local call-in show is hosted weekday afternoons by Steve Tannen. KUJZ is the Eugene outlet for Oregon Ducks football, basketball, and baseball broadcasts, the NFL, and the Eugene Emeralds.
