= KLOO-FM =

Radio station in Corvallis, Oregon

- Corvallis, Oregon; United States
- Broadcast area: Salem-Albany–Corvallis–Lebanon, Oregon (Willamette Valley)
- Frequency: 106.3 MHz
- Branding: 106.3 KLOO (pronounced as "Clue")

Programming
- Format: Classic rock
- Affiliations: Compass Media Networks; United Stations Radio Networks

Ownership
- Owner: Bicoastal Media; (Bicoastal Media Licenses V, LLC)
- Sister stations: KDUK-FM, KEJO, KFLY, KLOO, KODZ, KPNW, KRKT-FM, KTHH

History
- First air date: January 7, 1973 (at 106.1)
- Former call signs: KLOO-FM (1973–1983); KFAT (1983–1997)
- Former frequencies: 106.1 MHz (1973–2001)

Technical information
- Licensing authority: FCC
- Facility ID: 35077
- Class: C
- ERP: 100,000 watts
- HAAT: 347 meters (1,138 ft)
- Transmitter coordinates: 44°38′47″N 123°16′10″W

Links
- Public license information: Public file; LMS
- Webcast: Listen Live

KLOO-FM (106.3 MHz) is a commercial radio station licensed to serve Corvallis, Oregon, United States. The station is owned by Bicoastal Media and the broadcast license is held by Bicoastal Media Licenses V, LLC. KLOO-FM broadcasts a classic rock music format to the Salem, Oregon, and Mid-Willamette Valley areas. The station is an affiliate of the syndicated Pink Floyd program "Floydian Slip."

The station was reassigned the KLOO-FM call sign by the Federal Communications Commission on January 8, 1997.
