= KKNX =

- Eugene, Oregon; United States
- Broadcast area: Eugene–Springfield and vicinity
- Frequency: 840 kHz
- Branding: Radio 84 and FM 105.1

Programming
- Format: Classic hits
- Affiliations: Westwood One

Ownership
- Owner: Mielke Broadcasting Group

History
- First air date: 1992
- Former call signs: KZTZ (1991, CP); KDBS (1991–1995); KOOK (1995–1996)

Technical information
- Licensing authority: FCC
- Facility ID: 5390
- Class: D
- Power: 1,000 watts (day); 170 watts (night)
- Transmitter coordinates: 44°04′53.4″N 123°06′38.3″W
- Translator: 105.1 K286CJ (Eugene)

Links
- Public license information: Public file; LMS
- Webcast: Listen live
- Website: radio84.com

KKNX (840 AM) is a classic hits radio station broadcasting to the Eugene, Oregon area on 840 AM and 105.1 FM.

840 AM is a United States clear-channel frequency, on which WHAS in Louisville, Kentucky is the dominant Class A station. KKNX must reduce nighttime power to protect the skywave signal of WHAS.

== Translator ==
KKNX also broadcasts on the following FM translator:

Broadcast translator for KKNX
Call sign	Frequency	City of license	FID	ERP (W)	Class	FCC info
K286CJ	105.1 FM	Eugene, Oregon	148828	99	D	LMS
