= KLLK =

Currently silent
- Willits, California; United States
- Broadcast area: Fort Bragg-Ukiah area
- Frequency: 1250 kHz
- Branding: AM 1250 KLLK

Programming
- Format: Classic hits

Ownership
- Owner: Bicoastal Media Licenses, LLC
- Sister stations: KUKI-FM

History
- First air date: 1985

Technical information
- Licensing authority: FCC
- Facility ID: 65697
- Class: B
- Power: 5,000 watts (day); 2,500 watts (night)
- Transmitter coordinates: 39°23′57.6″N 123°19′24″W
- Translator: 104.3 K282CC (Ukiah)

Links
- Public license information: Public file; LMS
- Website: kuki.com

KLLK (1250 AM) is a radio station that is silent. Until 2025, it broadcast a classic hits format, simulcasting KUKI from Ukiah. Licensed to Willits, California, United States, the station serves the Fort Bragg-Ukiah area. The station is owned by Bicoastal Media Licenses, LLC.

KLLK went silent in December 2025 for financial reasons. In August 2026, Bicoastal Media sold KLLK to Mendocino County Public Broadcasting for $1,000; the station will join the public radio network originating at KZYX in Philo.
