= KEHK =

Radio station in Brownsville–Eugene, Oregon

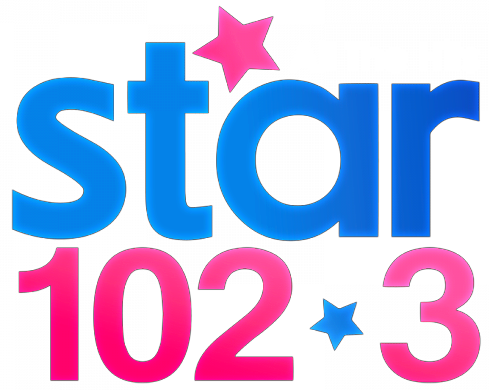
- Brownsville, Oregon; United States
- Broadcast area: Eugene; Springfield
- Frequency: 102.3 MHz
- Branding: Star 102.3

Programming
- Format: hot adult contemporary
- Affiliations: Westwood One

Ownership
- Owner: Cumulus Media; (Cumulus Licensing LLC)
- Sister stations: KNRQ; KUGN; KUJZ; KZEL-FM

History
- First air date: 1991
- Former call signs: KGAL-FM (1990–1994); KLRF (1994–1996)
- Call sign meaning: "Eugene Hawk" (previous format)

Technical information
- Licensing authority: FCC
- Facility ID: 7989
- Class: C1
- ERP: 100,000 watts horizontal polarization; 43,000 watts vertical polarization
- HAAT: 280 meters (920 ft)
- Transmitter coordinates: 44°0′7.4″N 123°6′54.3″W

Links
- Public license information: Public file; LMS
- Webcast: Listen live; Listen live; Listen live (via iHeartRadio)
- Website: www.starfm1023.com

KEHK (102.3 FM) is a commercial radio station licensed to Brownsville, Oregon, and serving the Eugene-Springfield radio market. It is owned by Cumulus Media and airs a hot adult contemporary radio format, using the moniker "Star 102.3." KEHK's studios and offices are on Executive Parkway in Eugene, and its transmitter is off Blanton Road, also in Eugene.

== History ==
The station first signed on as KGAL-FM on April 1, 1991. It was owned by Eads Broadcasting Corporation, along with KSHO in Lebanon, Oregon. KGAL-FM aired a satellite oldies format, using the "Kool Gold" service. Initially it was only powered at 6,000 watts, a fraction of its power today, and did not significantly reach the Eugene-Springfield market.

In 1994, it moved to its current transmitter site with an adult album alternative format as "Clear 102.3" and changed its call sign to KLRF. In 1996, it switched to classic hits as "102.3 The Hawk" and its current call letters KEHK. In 2003, it changed to "Star 102.3" with its hot adult contemporary format.
