= KNRQ =

Radio station in Harrisburg–Eugene, Oregon

- Harrisburg, Oregon; United States
- Broadcast area: Eugene–Springfield, Oregon
- Frequency: 103.7 MHz
- Branding: Alternative 103-7 KNRQ

Programming
- Format: Alternative rock
- Affiliations: Compass Media Networks; United Stations Radio Networks

Ownership
- Owner: Cumulus Media; (Cumulus Licensing LLC)
- Sister stations: KUJZ, KZEL, KEHK, KUGN

History
- First air date: April 1974
- Former call signs: KOMS (1974–1978); KIQY (1978–1993); KXPC (1993–2013)
- Call sign meaning: "New Rock"

Technical information
- Licensing authority: FCC
- Facility ID: 61987
- Class: C0
- ERP: 100,000 watts
- HAAT: 310 meters (1,020 ft)
- Transmitter coordinates: 44°00′08″N 123°06′50″W
- Translator: 98.5 K253CF (Cottage Grove)

Links
- Public license information: Public file; LMS
- Webcast: Listen live; Listen live; Listen live (via iHeartRadio)
- Website: nrq.com

KNRQ (103.7 FM) is a commercial radio station licensed to Harrisburg, Oregon, United States, and serving the Eugene–Springfield market. It is owned by Cumulus Media and airs an alternative rock format.

Studios and offices are on Executive Parkway in Eugene and the transmitter is off Blanton Road, also in Eugene, sharing a tower with several other FM and TV stations.

== Station history ==
The station signed on in April 1974, as KOMS. On September 27, 1978, the call sign was changed to KIQY. These call letters were chosen because of their resemblance to "K104" the station’s branding at the time.

By the late 1980s, KIQY’s format had evolved from adult contemporary to Top 40, as 103.7 KIQY. In August 1991, the station became "The Heat 103.7" as it picked up the satellite network programming. By 1993, KIQY had returned to all-local programming, and by the summer, rebranded as "Hot 103.7" with KIQY only being mentioned during the hourly legal ID.

On November 1, the format was changed from Top 40 to country music. To match the "Pure Country 103.7" branding, the station chose the call letters KXPC-FM which became official on November 16.

Until May 20, 2009, KXPC-FM (then licensed to Lebanon, Oregon) broadcast a country music format branded as "Pure Country 103.7". On May 20, 2009, the station fell silent for technical and financial reasons. The FCC granted the station temporary authority to remain silent on November 20, 2009, with a scheduled expiration of May 20, 2010. If the station did not resume broadcasting by the date, its broadcast license would be subject to automatic forfeiture as it would have been off the air continuously for a full year. The Educational Media Foundation announced that the station would be operated as a "satellite" of KLVR in Middletown, California, as part of the K-LOVE radio network.

On October 7, 2009, Portland Broadcasting LLC reached an agreement to transfer the broadcast license for KXPC-FM to the Educational Media Foundation for a total price of $1,250,000. The deal gained FCC approval on November 24, 2009, and the transaction was completed on December 18, 2009.

On November 13, 2009, the Educational Media Foundation applied to have the FCC modify the station's license from commercial to non-commercial educational. This request was granted on May 10, 2010.

On August 31, 2012, it was announced that Educational Media Foundation would sell KXPC-FM to Cumulus and Cumulus would move KNRQ from 97.9 FM to 103.7 FM when the 97.9 frequency moved to Portland, Oregon. On July 28, 2013, Cumulus moved KNRQ to 103.7 at 12 Midnight (PDT) and relocated the KXPC calls to 97.9 (later changed to KLVP), where it began testing the signal in the Portland area with music until its transmitter is signed on, as part of its deal to close on its swap with EMF on August 1, 2013.

== KNRQ history ==
KNRQ started out on 95.3 serving the Eugene-Springfield, Oregon area. That station applied for an FCC construction permit to move its 97.9 frequency and change its city of license to Tualatin, Oregon, so it could serve the Portland area. It was granted on May 24, 2010. The station applied for a modified construction permit to move the 97.9 frequency and change its city of license to Aloha, Oregon, also serving the Portland area. It was granted then cancelled on July 19, 2011. KNRQ remained on the 97.9 FM frequency until the call sign and format was swapped with 103.7 FM on July 28, 2013.

== Translators ==
KNRQ is simulcast on the following translator:

Call sign	Frequency	City of license	FID	ERP (W)	Class	FCC info
K253CF	98.5 FM	Cottage Grove, Oregon	12502	250	D	LMS
