= KKNU =

Radio station in Springfield–Eugene, Oregon

Coordinates: 44.001°N 123.114°W

- Springfield, Oregon; United States
- Broadcast area: Eugene-Springfield, Oregon
- Frequency: 93.3 MHz
- Branding: KKNU New Country 93.3

Programming
- Format: Country

Ownership
- Owner: McKenzie River Broadcasting
- Sister stations: KEUG, KMGE

History
- First air date: December 18, 1958 (as KEED-FM at 93.1)
- Former call signs: KEED-FM (1958–1967); KORE-FM (1967–1976); KSND (1976–1993)
- Former frequencies: 93.1 MHz (1958–2006)
- Call sign meaning: NU = "New"

Technical information
- Facility ID: 40887
- Class: C0
- ERP: 100,000 watts horiz 43,000 watts vert
- HAAT: 395 meters
- Translator: See table

Links
- Webcast: Listen Live
- Website: kknu.fm

KKNU is a commercial country music radio station in Springfield, Oregon, broadcasting to the Eugene-Springfield, Oregon area on 93.3 FM. It is owned by Mckenzie River Broadcasting.

Syndicated programming included After Midnite with Blair Garner hosted by Blair Garner from Premiere Radio Networks.

== History ==
In the late 60's through the mid 70's, the station had a Country music format as KORE-FM.

Starting in the late 70's, running throughout the 80's, and into the early 90's, 93.1 KSND (known as “The Sound” or “K-Sound” for a time) had a Top 40 format. It was an affiliate of Rick Dees Weekly Top 40.

In late 1992, KSND was sold to McKenzie River Broadcasting, Inc. which ended the longtime Top 40 format at the end of year. On January 1, 1993, KSND began a two-week-long simulcast with its new sister station; “Magic 94” KMGE. In mid-January, “New Country 93” launched with “Today’s Hottest New Country” and the KKNU call sign in February.

In 2006, KKNU moved from 93.1 to 93.3, to allow KAST-FM (now KRYP) to move into the Portland market on 93.1.

== Translators ==
KKNU programming is also carried on a network of broadcast translator stations to extend or improve the coverage area of the station.

Call sign	Frequency	City of license	FID	ERP (W)	Class	FCC info
K224CN	92.7 FM	Roseburg-Green, Oregon	84109	82	D	LMS
K225BE	92.9 FM	Cottage Grove, Oregon	40886	230	D	LMS
K265AB	100.9 FM	Florence, Oregon	40890	240	D	LMS
K281AF	104.1 FM	Oakridge, Oregon	40892	140	D	LMS
K285FH	104.9 FM	Glide, Oregon	156748	10	D	LMS
