= KORE =

- Springfield-Eugene, Oregon; United States
- Frequency: 1050 kHz
- Branding: 1050 & 102.9 - The Sports Animal

Programming
- Format: Sports
- Affiliations: Fox Sports Radio

Ownership
- Owner: Bulldog Media Broadcasting, LLC

History
- First air date: September 1927
- Call sign meaning: Oregon

Technical information
- Licensing authority: FCC
- Facility ID: 64034
- Class: D
- Power: 5,000 watts (day); 105 watts (night)
- Transmitter coordinates: 44°4′53.4″N 123°6′38.3″W
- Translator: 102.9 K275CX (Eugene)

Links
- Public license information: Public file; LMS
- Webcast: Listen live
- Website: www.sportsanimaleug.com

KORE (1050 AM) is a commercial radio station dual licensed to Springfield and Eugene, Oregon, United States. It airs a sports format and is owned by Bulldog Media Broadcasting, LLC. The studios and offices are on Willagillespie Road off Oregon Route 132 in Eugene and the transmitter is sited on Goodpasture Road near the Willamette River in Eugene.

Programming is also heard on low-power FM translator K275CX at 102.9 MHz. Television station KLSR-TV (channel 34) also carries KORE audio overnight.

== History ==
According to Federal Communications Commission (FCC) records, KORE (Facility ID #64034) dates back to 1954. However, because the station inherited the KORE call sign in a 1966 call letter swap with the original KORE, it has traditionally traced its history to the 1927 founding of the original KORE, thus making it Eugene's oldest radio station.

=== Original KORE ===
The original KORE was first licensed on February 15, 1927, as KLIT, to Lewis Irvine Thompson at 475 Twenty-first Street in Portland. Its debut broadcast, with just 2 1/2 watts, took place at 8 p.m. on February 24, and included an address by Mayor George L. Baker. In early 1928, the station was sold to the Eugene Broadcast Station, which moved the station to Eugene, and changed the call letters to KORE, reflecting the first three letters of Oregon.

The long-running religious program, The World Tomorrow, originated on KORE in 1933. For most of its history, KORE was a full-service radio station, airing popular adult music, news and sports. In March 1941, with the implementation of the North American Regional Broadcasting Agreement, the original KORE moved to 1450 kHz.

=== 1966 call letter swap of KORE and KEED ===
In November 1966, the call signs of KORE and KEED were swapped, with AM 1050 changed to KORE from KEED, and AM 1450 changed from KORE to KEED.

KORE flipped to country music in 1970 and became a network affiliate of the Mutual Broadcasting System. But as fans of country music switched to the FM dial, KORE decided to appeal to a different audience. It adopted a Christian talk and teaching format in 1973, changing its network to USA Radio News.

For most of its history, operation on 1050 AM was as a daytimer station, required to stop broadcasting at sunset to avoid interfering with XEG in Monterrey, Mexico, the dominant Class A station on 1050 AM. But by the 1980s, restrictions on clear channel frequencies had been relaxed. KORE was able to apply to the FCC for full time operation, running 5,000 watts by day and reduced power at night. On June 15, 2016, KORE went silent. On November 23, 2016, it resumed broadcasting as a sports radio station with programming from Fox Sports Radio.

== Programming ==
KORE changed its imaging to THE SPORTS ANIMAL on July 20, 2026. Still affiliated with Fox Sports, it airs Dan Patrick and Colin Cowherd in the mornings, and the new "Bald Faced Truth Unfiltered" from John Canzano from 2-3pm PT. The station now features a statewide PM show called "The Drive" from 3-6pm with Danny Havel, Steve Mims, and Justin Grossweiner, heard on stations in Corvallis, Albany, Lebanon, Medford, Roseburg, Newport, and Klamath Falls. The station broadcasts Willamette HS Football, Bushnell University Men's and Women's Basketball, and the Eugene Emeralds, along with NFL, NCAA Football and March Madness.

== Translator ==
KORE also broadcasts on the following FM translator:

Broadcast translator for KORE
Call sign	Frequency	City of license	FID	ERP (W)	Class	Transmitter coordinates	FCC info
K275CX	102.9 FM	Eugene, Oregon	156576	250	D	44°0′6″N 123°6′51.6″W	LMS
