= KZEL-FM =

- Eugene, Oregon; United States
- Broadcast area: Eugene–Springfield, Oregon
- Frequency: 96.1 MHz
- Branding: 96.1 KZEL

Programming
- Format: Classic rock
- Affiliations: Westwood One

Ownership
- Owner: Cumulus Media; (Cumulus Licensing LLC)
- Sister stations: KUJZ, KNRQ, KEHK, KUGN

History
- First air date: 1969
- Call sign meaning: George Zellner, station founder

Technical information
- Licensing authority: FCC
- Facility ID: 49822
- Class: C
- ERP: 100,000 watts (horiz.); 43,000 watts (vert.)
- HAAT: 333 meters (1,093 ft)
- Transmitter coordinates: 44°00′05″N 123°06′48″W
- Translators: 96.7 K244DL (Cottage Grove); 99.3 K257EB (Riddle); 102.1 K271BL (Roseburg)

Links
- Public license information: Public file; LMS
- Webcast: Listen live; Listen live; Listen live (via iHeartRadio)
- Website: 96kzel.com

KZEL-FM (96.1 FM) is a commercial radio station licensed to Eugene, Oregon, United States. The station airs a classic rock format.

It has applied for a U.S. Federal Communications Commission (FCC) construction permit to move to a taller tower (HAAT 451.9 meters) at the same site and increase the vertically polarized ERP to 100,000 watts.

== History ==
KZEL-FM, along with short-lived KZEL-AM, was founded and funded in 1967 by Eugene Lumberman and George "Tirebiter" Zellner. When he purchased the stations, their call letters were KWFS. Zellner changed the call letters to KZEL, for the FM and AM bands. KZEL-AM was briefly affiliated with the CBS network, and carried Frank Gifford's sports updates from CBS, along with broadcasts of Churchill High School sports and Eugene Bombers pro football. Zellner sold the station to Jay and Barbara West in 1971.

The Wests led KZEL for most of the 1970s as a free-format station. Its studios were located in Glenwood, near Springfield. Disc jockeys included John Napier, Gary "The Wasted Potato" Palmatier, Stan "Harry 'Til 6" Garrett, Michael Waggoner, Sleepy John (Cuthbertson), JET, Tom Krumm, Chris Kovarik, Magic Mike, and Peyton Mays. Additionally, KZEL carried "Daybreak" in the morning and "News & Information" in the afternoon. News anchors included Melinda Coates, Rosemary Reed, Cal Turlock (real name Phillip Johnson) and Bryce Zabel.

In the 1970s the News department was headed by Matt McCormick, aided by Tim Helfrich, and Josh Marquis, all destined to become practicing lawyers.

KZEL-FM is owned by Cumulus Media, a nationwide owner of radio stations. The station's heritage rock format evolved into classic rock in the early 1990s. In 2006, the program director, Mark Raney, locked himself in the station's control room for 10 days to protest the management's decision to abandon KZEL's classic rock format and replace it with country music. Raney, with support from his listeners, persuaded the station's management to retain the rock format.

KZEL-FM then evolved from a classic rock format into more of an adult album alternative rock format, adding newer artists and music to the playlist. Weekday personalities on the station still include Mark Raney and John Frederick in the morning, Emma at mid-day, and C.Y.D. in the afternoon. In December 2018, Mark Raney retired after 41 years in the radio industry.

On June 1, 2018, KZEL returned to a classic rock format.

== Translators ==
KZEL-FM programming is also carried on a series of broadcast translator stations to extend or improve the coverage area of the station.

Broadcast translators for KZEL-FM
Call sign	Frequency	City of license	FID	ERP (W)	Class	FCC info
K244DL	96.7 FM	Cottage Grove, Oregon	49820	250	D	LMS
K257EB	99.3 FM	Riddle, Oregon	156832	10	D	LMS
K271BL	102.1 FM	Roseburg, Oregon	57282	62	D	LMS
