= KTHH =

- Albany, Oregon; United States
- Frequency: 990

Programming
- Format: Full Service

Ownership
- Owner: Bicoastal Media

History
- First air date: January 16, 1959

Links
- Website: www.midvalleyradio.com

KTHH (990 AM, "Mid Valley Radio") is a radio station licensed to serve Albany, Oregon, United States. The station, which began broadcasting in 1959, is currently owned by Bicoastal Media and the broadcast license is held by Bicoastal Media Licenses V, LLC.

== Programming ==
KTHH broadcasts "Mid-Valley Radio", featuring local news, sports and music from the 70's to today. In addition to its usual music programming, KTHH airs Major League Baseball games as a member of the Seattle Mariners Radio Network.

== History ==
=== Launch as KABY ===
This station began regular broadcast operations on January 16, 1959, with 250 watts of power, daytime-only, on a frequency of 990 kHz. KABY was owned by the Albany Broadcasting Corporation with Chet Wheeler serving as president and general manager. Just over three years after the station was launched, in May 1962, it was sold to Radio Station KNND, Inc., and W. Gorden Crockett took over as general manager.

=== Change to KRKT ===
The new owners had the call sign changed to KRKT later in 1962. In 1963, the name of the license holding company was changed to Radio Stations KNND & KRKT, Inc. to reflect the duopoly ownership. In 1966, Peter J. Ryan and Milton A. Viken were acting as co-general managers of the station but by 1967 Ryan would be full in charge as the station's sole general manager.

The company named was changed again in 1968, this time to the more general Interstate Broadcasters, Inc., while Peter J. Ryan remained the GM. Robert Esty joined the station in 1971 overseeing its popular music format as general manager, promotions manager, and vice president of the company. In 1972, Harry Gilt took over the general manager and promotions manager jobs as the station shifted its format slightly to a contemporary music mix.

Robert Esty returned in early 1973 when his Linn-Benton Broadcasters, Inc., purchased the station from Interstate Broadcasters, Inc., in a transaction that was consummated on May 1, 1973. The company name represented the two Oregon counties served by this station's broadcast signal: Linn and Benton. Esty resumed his general manager duties while Harry Gilt remained with the station as the program director overseeing the new country & western music format. The station would stay a country music outlet through the rest of the 1970s and well beyond.

In April 1998, Robert A. Esty & Marianne Esty applied to the FCC to transfer control of KRKT to the Robert & Marianne Esty Charitable Remainder Trust. The transfer was approved by the FCC on May 19, 1998. In June 1998, the Robert & Marianne Esty Charitable Remainder Trust reached an agreement to sell this station to Jacor Communications. The deal was approved by the FCC on August 18, 1998, and the transaction was consummated on September 15, 1998.

KRKT owner Jacor Communications, Inc., was acquired by Clear Channel Communications in May 1999. In December 2000, as part of a reorganization after the merger, the KRKT broadcast license was transferred from Jacor Broadcasting of Oregon, Inc., to Citicasters Licenses, Inc. The transfer was approved by the FCC on January 4, 2001, and the transaction was consummated on June 19, 2001.

=== Switch to KTHH ===
The station dropped its classic country music programming for a progressive talk format, primarily programming from Air America Radio, branded as "990 The Truth", beginning on October 4, 2004. To accompany the new branding, the station applied for and was assigned the KTHH call sign by the FCC on October 5, 2004. The station dropped the talk programming to return to a classic country music format branded as "The Legend" in late 2006.

In May 2007, Clear Channel Communications subsidiary Citicasters Licenses, L.P., reached an agreement to sell this station to Bicoastal Media LLC as part of a 14-station deal valued at a reported $37.18 million. The deal was approved by the FCC on July 2, 2007, and the transaction was consummated on October 1, 2007. At the time of the sale, KTHH broadcast a country music format.

As part of an internal corporate reorganization, Bicoastal Media applied to the FCC in October 2007 to transfer the broadcast license for KTHH from its Bicoastal Willamette Valley, LLC, subsidiary to Bicoastal Media Licenses V, LLC. The transfer was approved by the FCC on October 29, 2007, and the transaction was consummated on the same day.

KTHH aired the minor league baseball games of the Corvallis Knights in the 2007 and 2008 seasons before the games shifted to KEJO for the 2009 season.

On March 1, 2011, KTHH changed its format to comedy, branded as "Comedy 990".

On July 1, 2026, KTHH changed its format to "Mid-Valley Radio", featuring programming from www.midvalleyradio.com
