= KATU =

Television station in Portland, Oregon

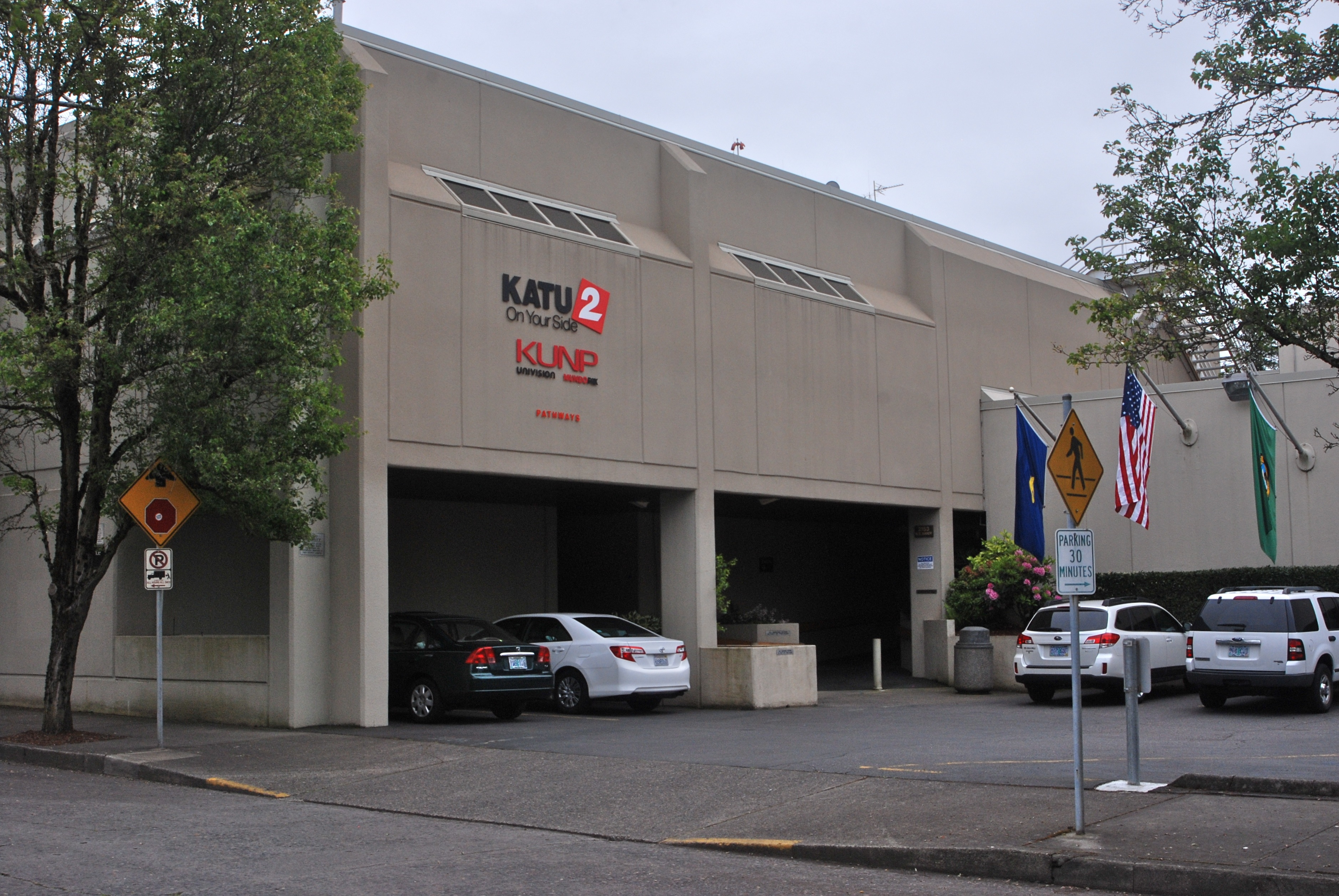
- KATU is the only Portland TV station operating from its original site, a former laundry on Sandy Boulevard, since it launched in 1962
- Portland–Salem, Oregon; Vancouver, Washington; United States
- City: Portland, Oregon
- Channels: Digital: 24 (UHF); Virtual: 2
- Branding: KATU (pronounced "K-2")

Programming
- Affiliations: 2.1: ABC; 2.2: Independent; for others, see § Subchannels

Ownership
- Owner: Sinclair Broadcast Group; (Sinclair Portland Licensee, LLC)
- Sister stations: KUNP

History
- First air date: March 15, 1962
- Former channel numbers: Analog: 2 (VHF, 1962–2009); Digital: 43 (UHF, 1998–2019)
- Former affiliations: Independent (1962–1964)
- Call sign meaning: Sounds like "K-2"

Technical information
- Licensing authority: FCC
- Facility ID: 21649
- ERP: 1,000 kW
- HAAT: 524 m (1,719 ft)
- Transmitter coordinates: 45°30′57.8″N 122°44′3.1″W
- Translator(s): see § Translators

Links
- Public license information: Public file; LMS
- Website: katu.com

KATU (channel 2) is a television station in Portland, Oregon, United States, affiliated with ABC. It is owned by Sinclair Broadcast Group alongside La Grande–licensed independent station KUNP, channel 16 (which KATU simulcasts on its second digital subchannel). The two stations share studios on Northeast Sandy Boulevard in Portland; KATU's transmitter is located in the Sylvan-Highlands section of the city.

KATU went on the air in 1962 as Portland's fourth commercial television station. Built by the Fisher Broadcasting Company (later Fisher Communications), KATU remained an independent station until 1964, when it began an affiliation with ABC. In the early 1970s, KATU expanded its local programming and became a contender in Portland-area local news ratings. In 2013, Fisher Communications and KATU were acquired by Sinclair Broadcast Group.

== History ==
=== Channel 2 comes to Portland ===
Channel 2 was not initially assigned to Portland, being allocated in 1957. That action spurred activity on the valuable frequency. Four applications were initially received, from The Oregon Journal, owner of KPOJ (1330 AM); Fisher Broadcasting Company, which owned KOMO radio and television in Seattle; Tribune Publishing Company, publisher of The News Tribune and owner of KTNT-TV in Tacoma, Washington; and KPTV (channel 12), which wanted to move to channel 2. KPTV later withdrew, and KPOJ dropped its application in March, but it was not until the end of 1959 that a Federal Communications Commission (FCC) hearing examiner recommended Fisher over the Tribune Publishing Company for the channel 2 construction permit. The full commission began drafting paperwork in support of this decision in December 1960, and Fisher received the permit on February 23, 1961.

Work began to build facilities in the former Crystal Laundry on NE Sandy Boulevard in June; the two-story building was refitted to contain two production studios. The station originally was assigned the call letters KOXO but switched to the call sign KATU within months.

KATU began broadcasting on March 15, 1962, originally operating as an independent station; Portland native and film actress Jane Powell hosted the opening ceremonies. The station's transmitter was originally located atop Livingston Mountain, about 7 miles (11 km) north-northeast of Camas, Washington; this northerly site had been required to maintain minimum spacing to the unbuilt channel 3 (the future KVDO-TV) at Salem.

While it was the 25th independent in the United States, from the moment it went on air, speculation swirled that KATU might look to poach a network affiliation from one of the three other commercial stations in Portland. Rumors intensified in June 1963 as KATU began construction of a transmitter in Portland's West Hills, which would improve its signal coverage and co-site channel 2 with the other major stations. The news came in early December when ABC announced it would drop KPTV, Oregon's oldest television station, and move to KATU on March 1, 1964. The news led to speculation that the ABC switch to KATU, in spite of KPTV's performance being comparable to that of other ABC affiliates, was a countermove by the network to avoid losing Seattle's KOMO-TV, one of the network's few top-rated stations at the time, to a possible overture by CBS. KPTV—which had been ABC's Portland affiliate since 1959—sued, alleging that Fisher coerced ABC into affiliating with KATU by threatening to defect in Seattle. (It was the second time KPTV had lost an affiliation to a group owner in five years; King Broadcasting Company's KGW-TV [channel 8] displaced KPTV as the NBC television affiliate in Portland in 1959, and its KING-TV in Seattle replaced KOMO-TV in the network lineup.)

After a decade in which the station struggled to build an identity in the market, KATU began to find its way in the early 1970s after expanding its local programming. New shows such as public affairs program Town Hall, weekend children's program Bumpity, and morning talk show AM Northwest proved critical to the station's success. KATU continues to broadcast AM Northwest, while other shows, such as Faces & Places and Two at Four, ended in the 1980s.

In 1975, KATU-TV became sister stations with Hokkaido Television Broadcasting in Sapporo, Japan, a sister city of Portland. The stations exchanged documentary footage of events in their areas.

KATU was Portland's first commercial station to broadcast in digital, doing so in 1998 alongside Oregon Public Broadcasting. KATU shut down its analog signal, over VHF channel 2, on June 12, 2009, the official date on which full-power television stations in the United States transitioned from analog to digital broadcasts under federal mandate. The station's digital signal remained on its pre-transition UHF channel 43, using virtual channel 2.

=== Sinclair Broadcast Group ownership ===
On April 10, 2013, KATU and Fisher Communications's other holdings were acquired by the Sinclair Broadcast Group. The FCC granted its approval of the deal on August 7, and the sale was completed the following day.

On May 8, 2017, Sinclair Broadcast Group entered into an agreement to acquire Tribune Media—owner of CW affiliate KRCW-TV (channel 32)—for $3.9 billion, plus the assumption of $2.7 billion in debt held by Tribune. Sinclair would have been required to sell one of KUNP or KRCW-TV if the deal were to be approved. However, in 2018, the FCC designated the deal for hearing by an administrative law judge; the deal was then terminated by Tribune.

== Local programming ==
=== News operation ===
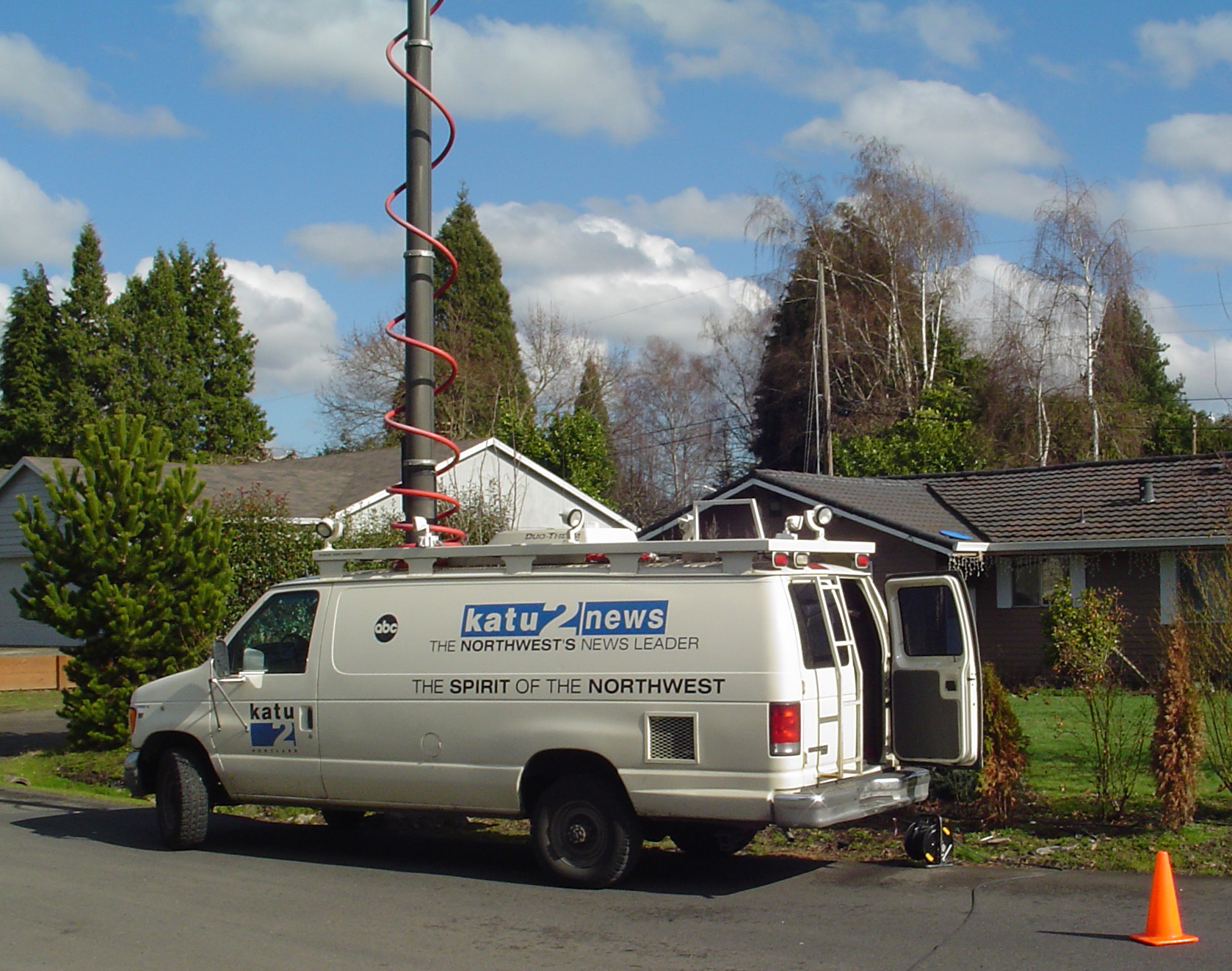
A KATU news van in 2007

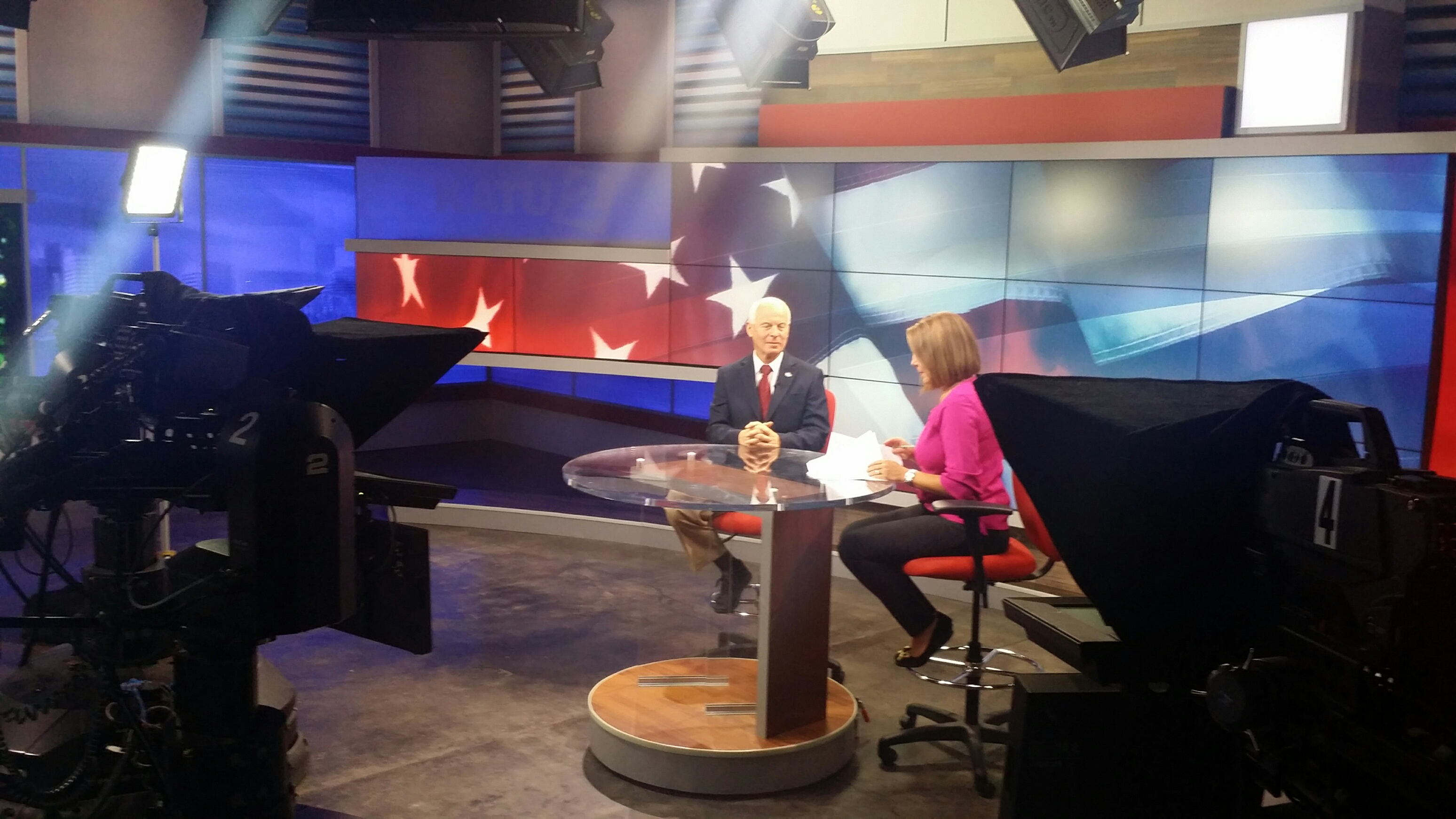
Debra Knapp of KATU on set interviewing Oregon Secretary of State Dennis Richardson

From the station's first day on air, KATU produced local newscasts. As an independent, its late-night local news aired at 10 p.m. This changed after the station switched to ABC in 1964, but KATU remained mired in third place in local news coverage behind KOIN-TV and KGW-TV, which were said to have a "stranglehold" on Portland viewers.

One Oregon news event covered by KATU cameras in the station's first decade on air acquired lasting notoriety. In November 1970, reporter Paul Linnman, who worked at KATU from 1967 to 1972 before returning to the station in 1984 and retiring from TV news in 2004, traveled to Florence, Oregon, where a sperm whale washed ashore; its carcass was exploded unsuccessfully. The station continued to receive requests for footage years after the event and has since commemorated anniversaries of the exploding whale, including a news special in 1995 and a remaster of the original newsfilm in 2020. The 4K remaster was conducted by the Oregon Historical Society, which has held the original film in its collection since the 1980s.

In 1975, Richard Ross left KGW-TV after 19 years to become the news director at channel 2. That same year, former Oregon governor Tom McCall joined KATU as commentator; prior to becoming governor, he had also worked at KGW. Under Ross, the station produced such efforts as Kidwitness News, a monthly newscast for kids anchored by puppets; the station's documentary unit won a Peabody Award in 1981. McCall's commentaries continued appearing despite his battle with cancer leading up to his death in January 1983.

News hires at KATU in the 1980s included Jeff Gianola, who initially joined as a weekend weather presenter in 1983 and became evening anchor before defecting to KOIN in 1998, and Bill O'Reilly, the future Fox News Channel anchor whose tenure in Portland lasted less than a year due to family reasons. O'Reilly's time with the station was marked by remarks about Portland being a "vacation" compared to his previous job in Boston, which displeased management, and an incident in which he left his paycheck in a copy machine, unwittingly divulging a six-figure salary that irked underpaid colleagues. By 1985, what had once been a five-person staff in the early days had become a 60-person news department.

KATU had worked its way up to having the top-rated newscasts in Portland by 1997, but ratings were starting to decline before Gianola's departure for KOIN, which was responsible for leading a resurgence at that station. In 1997, the station's general manager concocted a promotional strategy, known as the "Power of 2", by which the station acquired two news helicopters, in an attempt to increase falling ratings, even though the news director had previously said helicopters were primarily a marketing tool. The campaign was produced with such secrecy that its first airing took newsroom employees by surprise. Within a month of the highly publicized debut of the second helicopter, the leased helicopter, "JetRanger II", crashed and burned in November while harvesting Christmas trees.

By 2021, KATU had returned to first place in early and late evening news in total viewership, though Fox affiliate KPTV beat it out in morning news. That year, the station attracted industry attention for suspending an entire day of newscasts so the station staff could take stress management training in light of increasing burnout in television news.

=== Sports ===
On September 23, 2024, the Portland Trail Blazers announced a new television deal with Sinclair to create the Rip City Television Network, with Sinclair stations and subchannels to air the team's games in the Portland, Seattle, Medford, Eugene, and Yakima/Tri-Cities markets. In Portland, KATU would broadcast six games on its ABC subchannel, with additional games to be aired by KATU's 2.2 subchannel and—beginning January 1, 2025—KUNP.

=== Notable former on-air staff ===
- Dick Bogle – reporter and anchor, 1968–1982
- Anna Canzano – anchor/investigative reporter
- Jack Faust – host of the weekly public affairs show Town Hall, 1980–1993
- Paul Magers – reporter, 1979–1981
- Rob Marciano – meteorologist, 1997–2003
- Cathy Marshall – reporter/anchor, 1998–2003
- Tom Rinaldi
- Roger Twibell – sports reporter (1973–1975)
- Brian Wood – reporter/anchor, 2008–2021
- Linda Yu – news anchor, 1975

== Technical information ==
=== Subchannels ===
KATU broadcasts from a transmitter in the Sylvan-Highlands area of Portland. The station's signal is multiplexed:

Subchannels of KATU
Subchannel	Res.	Short name	Programming
2.1	720p	KATU	ABC
2.2	1080i	KUNP	KUNP (Independent)
2.3	480i	Comet	Comet
32.1	1080i	KRCW	The CW (KRCW-TV)

Simulcast of subchannels of another station
Broadcast on behalf of another station

The 32.1 subchannel for KRCW-TV is broadcast by KATU as part of Portland's ATSC 3.0 (NextGen TV) deployment plan; in exchange, KRCW-TV broadcasts KATU in that format.

=== Translators ===
KATU is additionally rebroadcast over a network of 16 low-power digital translator stations:

- Astoria: K26DB-D
- Baker Valley: K27MX-D
- Corvallis: K08PZ-D
- Hood River: K28CQ-D
- La Grande: K32LY-D
- La Grande: K35GA-D
- Lincoln City, etc.: K32NK-D
- Madras: K26NX-D
- Milton-Freewater: K28FT-D
- Pendleton: K34DI-D
- Prineville: K35LD-D
- Rainier: K31HK-D
- Rockaway Beach: K23NS-D
- The Dalles: K18HH-D
- Tillamook: K34PJ-D
- Grays River/Lebam, WA: K20NL-D
