= KGW =

Television station in Portland, Oregon

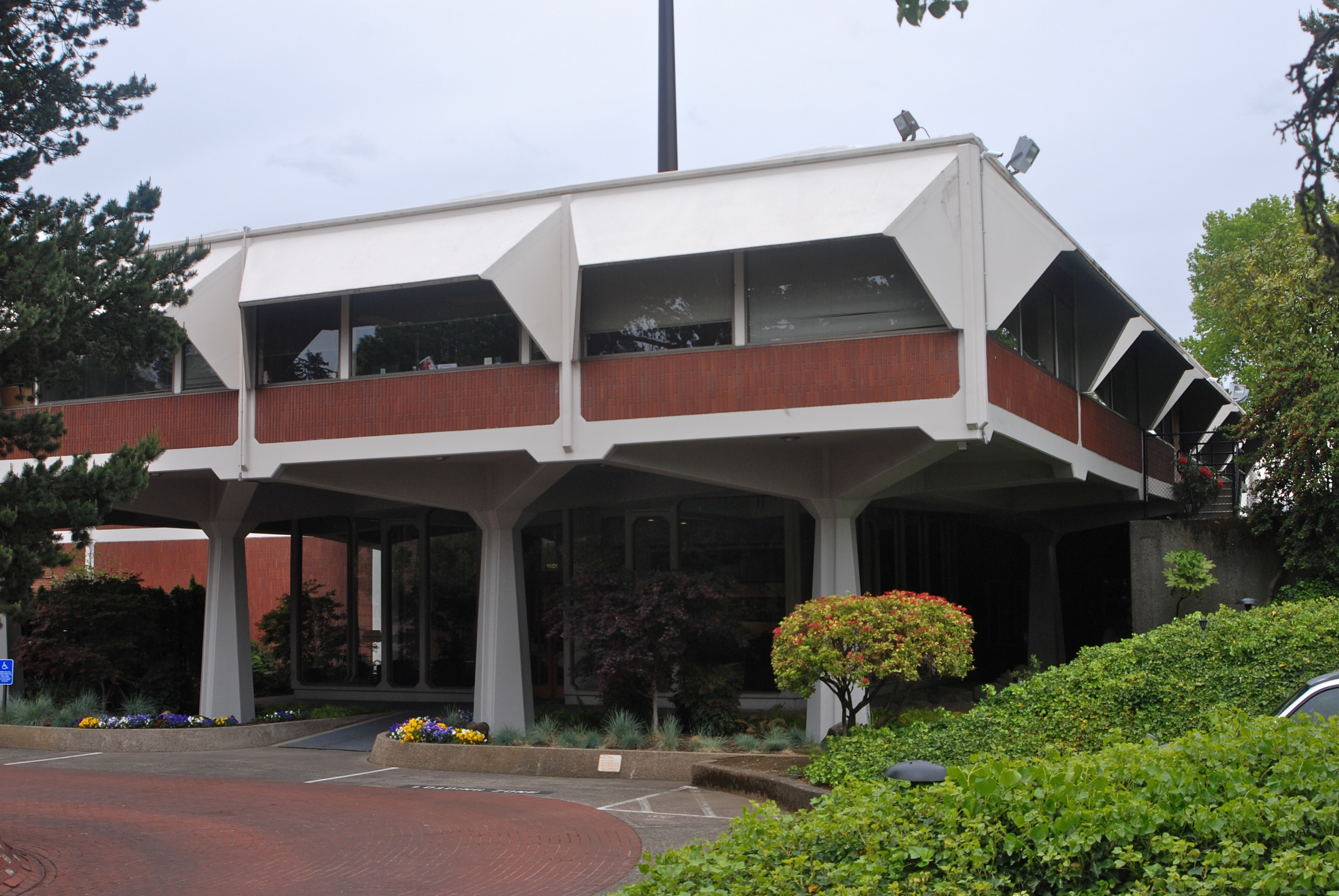
- KGW's studio building, designed by Fred Bassetti
- Portland–Salem, Oregon; Vancouver, Washington; United States
- City: Portland, Oregon
- Channels: Digital: 26 (UHF); Virtual: 8
- Branding: KGW 8; KGW News

Programming
- Affiliations: 8.1: NBC; for others, see § Technical information and Subchannels

Ownership
- Owner: Tegna Inc., a subsidiary of Nexstar Media Group; (Sander Operating Co. III LLC d/b/a KGW Television)
- Sister stations: Nexstar: KOIN, KRCW-TV

History
- First air date: December 15, 1956
- Former call signs: KGW-TV (1956–1994)
- Former channel numbers: Analog: 8 (VHF, 1956–2009); Digital: 46 (UHF, 2000–2009), 8 (VHF, 2009–2021)
- Former affiliations: ABC (1956–1959)
- Call sign meaning: Derived from KGW radio, randomly assigned

Technical information
- Licensing authority: FCC
- Facility ID: 34874
- ERP: 1,000 kW
- HAAT: 539 m (1,768 ft)
- Transmitter coordinates: 45°31′20.5″N 122°44′49.5″W
- Translator(s): see § Translators

Links
- Public license information: Public file; LMS
- Website: kgw.com

KGW (channel 8) is a television station in Portland, Oregon, United States, affiliated with NBC. It is owned by the Tegna subsidiary of Nexstar Media Group; Nexstar also owns CBS affiliate KOIN (channel 6) and CW station KRCW-TV (channel 32). KGW's studios are located on Jefferson Street in southwestern Portland, and its transmitter is located in the city's Sylvan-Highlands section.

KGW-TV began broadcasting on December 15, 1956. It was built by a consortium of the Seattle-based King Broadcasting Company and Portland investors, owners of Portland radio station KGW (620 AM). It was the fourth television station on the air in Portland and took the ABC affiliation before switching to NBC in 1959. The present studios were completed in 1965 after the station's original facilities were placed in the path of Interstate 405. From the start, KGW-TV had a strong news team, with multiple on-air personnel who remained at the station for decades as well as commentator Tom McCall, who left the station in 1964 to run for public office and served two terms as Governor of Oregon. KGW's Evening show, introduced in 1975, was one of several weeknight feature magazines to predate the syndicated PM Magazine and aired in one form or another for 21 years. In news, KGW contended for number-one ratings through the 1970s but had inconsistent performances in the 1980s.

In 1990, the Providence Journal Company acquired King Broadcasting; the Belo Corporation in turn acquired Providence Journal in 1997. After several years of a slump in news ratings and a period of four news directors in the span of two years, the station found stability and ratings success in the mid- to late 1990s and reached number one in the 2000s and early 2010s, but news viewership began to decline as the station slipped to second place in the 2010s. For 25 years from 1992 to 2017, KGW was the broadcast television home of the Portland Trail Blazers basketball team. Belo sold its television stations in 2013 to the Gannett Company, which reorganized as Tegna in 2015; Nexstar, which already owned KOIN and KRCW, acquired Tegna in 2026, though integration activities have been halted by a federal injunction. KGW produces local newscasts and non-news programming covering Oregon and southwest Washington.

== History ==
=== The scramble for channels ===
Portland, Oregon, was one of the largest cities in the United States without a television station prior to the Federal Communications Commission (FCC) freezing new station assignments in 1948. The freeze ended in 1952, and Portland was assigned three VHF channels for commercial use: 6, 8, and 12. Prior to the freeze, five groups had applied with the FCC for what were then four available commercial channels. Among the pre-freeze applicants were radio stations KGW (620 AM), which had sought channel 6, and KOIN, which was the only applicant for channel 8. Two groups had applied for channel 10, which became reserved non-commercial educational after the freeze lifted. KEX, owned by Westinghouse Broadcasting, shifted its application from channel 10 to channel 8. Three other groups sought channel 8. Portland Television, Inc., was formed by a group of local businessmen. John R. Latourette Sr. and his son John R. Latourette Jr., partners in a Portland law firm, formed Cascade Television Company. The fourth applicant to file for channel 8 was North Pacific Television, in which Seattle-based King Broadcasting was the majority stockholder. Portland interests also participated in North Pacific Television, including president Gordon Orput, an insurance executive, and men active in the real estate and oil industries. The applications were designated for comparative hearing in September 1952 as the commission prepared to hear applications for all of Portland's contested channels. With twelve applicants seeking the four channels, months of testimony were required.

Hearings on channel 8 began on January 26, 1953, as the third group of applicants to be analyzed. First to present its case was Portland Television, which had to explain similarities between program proposals in its bid and those of a sister company, Denver Television, for a station in Denver. Next was KEX, followed by North Pacific Television. North Pacific relied heavily on its experience as the only pre-freeze television broadcaster in the Pacific Northwest, operating Seattle's KING-TV. The last firm to present was Cascade Television; it refused to present new testimony, and FCC hearing examiner Elizabeth C. Smith held the firm in default.

Meanwhile, KGW and KOIN both sought channel 6. Their bids and one from KXL were in the last group to be heard, which was already delayed by the slow pace of the channel 8 hearings. KXL dropped its application, and on May 17, 1953, KGW and KOIN announced they would merge their television applications. Under the agreement, which averted a lengthy contest for channel 6 and promised to put the station on the air sooner, KOIN would win the permit, but the Newhouse family, publishers of The Oregonian and owners of KGW, would be allowed to buy half of KOIN's radio and television operation. That, in turn, required the divestiture of KGW to meet FCC radio ownership limits. On August 30, KGW radio found its buyer: the same investors involved in North Pacific Television.

Hearing examiner Smith issued an initial decision favoring North Pacific Television on June 22, 1954. The losing applicants appealed her decision to the FCC, which held a final round of arguments on the matter that December; by that time, Cascade was out of the running. Portland Television's lawyer alleged that Smith's decision was actively hostile to his firm, while Westinghouse decried the regional concentration of broadcast station ownership by King Broadcasting and its affiliates. The commission voted in June 1955 to uphold Smith's decision and award channel 8 to North Pacific Television.

=== Early years ===
With the channel awarded, planning and construction began. In March 1956, North Pacific Television purchased a plot of land in the Sylvan area to house the station's transmitter facility, after having originally sought to build at Mt. Scott. At the time, the station was designated as KTLV. The site was near where KOIN-TV (channel 6) had already located. North Pacific Television merged with Pioneer Broadcasters that March, and the station was given the call sign KGW-TV in May. Construction began in May; the station began broadcasting color test patterns in early November, even though its studios on 13th Avenue between SW Main and Jefferson streets were not yet ready.

KGW-TV was officially dedicated and began broadcasting on December 15, 1956. Formal ceremonies were held in the completed studios, known as Broadcast House, with 120 guests. KGW-TV was an ABC affiliate; even though KGW radio had long been associated with NBC, it changed to ABC. The previous ABC affiliate, KLOR-TV (channel 12), became an independent station at that time. (Note: KLOR-TV merged with KPTV (channel 27), the NBC affiliate, to become KPTV (channel 12) on May 1, 1957.) At its launch, KGW-TV was the first station in Portland to present live local programming in color, with two daily shows originating from its studios: Telarama and Pioneer Club. It also was the first station to telecast a basketball game in Portland when it aired a game between Portland and Fresno State.

The station remained an ABC affiliate until 1959, when King Broadcasting struck a group affiliation agreement with NBC covering the KGW stations in Portland and the KING stations in Seattle, also previously ABC affiliates. For KGW-TV, the new affiliation became effective on May 1, 1959. ABC programs moved to KPTV (channel 12).

The KGW-TV tower was toppled in the Columbus Day Storm on October 12, 1962. A tower from Spokane and an antenna previously used by KTNT-TV of Tacoma, Washington, were transported to Portland to put the station back on the air four days later. The outage occurred in the middle of the 1962 World Series; KOIN-TV broadcast two games of the series, including one game that both stations aired. After the collapse, the FCC granted KGW-TV permission to build a new tower, 270 feet (82 m) higher than the one lost in the storm, in July 1963, and it was completed and activated in early December. KATU (channel 2) and KPTV relocated to the Sylvan area around this time, clustering the four towers in the same general vicinity.

=== New studios and expansion ===
The KGW studio facility built in 1956 was in the path of a new freeway, the Stadium Freeway (Interstate 405), running between SW 13th and 14th avenues. As a result, in 1964, the company began constructing a new 50,000-square-foot (4,600 m^{2}) building down the street at 1501 SW Jefferson, between 14th and 16th avenues. The new facility, designed by architect Fred Bassetti, was dedicated in July by NBC newsman Chet Huntley, who had worked at KGW radio in the 1930s. It featured two studios for production as well as a weather station on the roof. This facility was enlarged in 1981.

In 1971, Ed Godfrey arrived at KGW-TV from KHOU-TV in Houston. Under Godfrey, in September 1975, the station introduced a weeknight newsmagazine, Evening. It was the only local program aired by a Portland TV station in the prime access window of 7 to 8 p.m. and was originally hosted by Dick Klinger and Robin Chapman, with Paul Linnman replacing Klinger in 1978. It debuted three years after KCRA-TV in Sacramento, California, premiered the similar Weeknight and a year before KPIX-TV in San Francisco launched its version of the format, Evening Magazine. KPIX's owner, Group W, took the concept national as the syndicated PM Magazine in 1978, and KGW's Evening was replaced with PM the next year. In this incarnation, KGW continued to produce more than half the local segments, but the remainder came from the other stations that produced local versions of PM Magazine. Linnman remained as host until he departed for KATU in 1983. When Group W discontinued syndication of PM Magazine in 1990—with KGW as one of 13 stations carrying it at the end—channel 8 restored a local magazine program in the time slot. The successor, Good Evening, ran until March 1996. In the early 1980s, KGW produced a local children's show, Just Kidding, hosted by KGW radio disc jockey Dave Hood.

From 1985 to 1988, KGW produced a local game show, On the Spot, hosted by Larry Blackmar Born out of the idea that people would respond to local residents as contestants, the show featured multiple-choice questions and required contestants to remember how many questions have been asked in each category. The decision to produce a local game show in-house was seen as unusual. Ratings for On the Spot, which aired weeknights at 6:30 p.m., lagged for the first season, but a jump in February led to a renewal; despite running in third place in the time slot, it was renewed for its third season in 1987–88. However, when KGW acquired rights to syndicated reruns of The Cosby Show, On the Spot was canceled.

King Broadcasting Company put itself up for sale in 1990, citing the age of its majority owners, Patsy Bullitt Collins and Harriet Stimson Bullitt, the daughters of the late Dorothy Bullitt. It accepted an offer from the Providence Journal Company in 1991, and the transaction closed the following year. King Broadcasting retained KGW radio, a full-service Top 40 station that flipped to talk in 1988, but shut down its separate programming in 1991, simulcasting its FM sister KINK.

The Belo Corporation purchased the Providence Journal Company in 1996. From 2001 to 2005, as part of a national association between Pax and NBC, KGW managed the operations of KPXG-TV (channel 22), Portland's Pax station, via a sales agreement; operations moved into KGW's studios. In the 2000s, KGW also provided services to KPOU, Portland's Univision station.

KGW's logo used from September 1999 to January 21, 2008.

KGW's logo used from January 22, 2008, to July 21, 2014.

=== Changes in ownership ===
On June 13, 2013, the Gannett Company announced that it would acquire Belo. However, since Gannett owned the Statesman Journal newspaper in Salem—within KGW's viewing area—KGW was instead sold to Sander Media LLC, owned by former Belo executive Jack Sander, in order to comply with the FCC's newspaper-broadcast cross-ownership restrictions. However, Gannett operated KGW through joint sales and shared services agreements. The sale was completed on December 23. The publishing and broadcasting portions of Gannett were split into separate companies in 2015, with the latter taking the name Tegna. This removed the cross-ownership conflict with the Statesman Journal. Shortly afterward, Sander Media filed with the FCC to transfer KGW's license back to King Broadcasting Company, now an in-name Tegna subsidiary; the acquisition was completed on December 3, 2015.

On August 19, 2025, Nexstar Media Group agreed to acquire Tegna for $6.2 billion. In Portland, Nexstar already owned KOIN and KRCW-TV (channel 32). The transaction was completed on March 19, 2026, after the FCC's Media Bureau waived restrictions prohibiting Nexstar from owning more than two full-power TV station licenses in markets such as Portland. A temporary restraining order issued one week later by the U.S. District Court for the Eastern District of California, later escalated to a preliminary injunction, has prevented KGW from being integrated into KOIN and KRCW.

== Programming ==
=== News operation ===
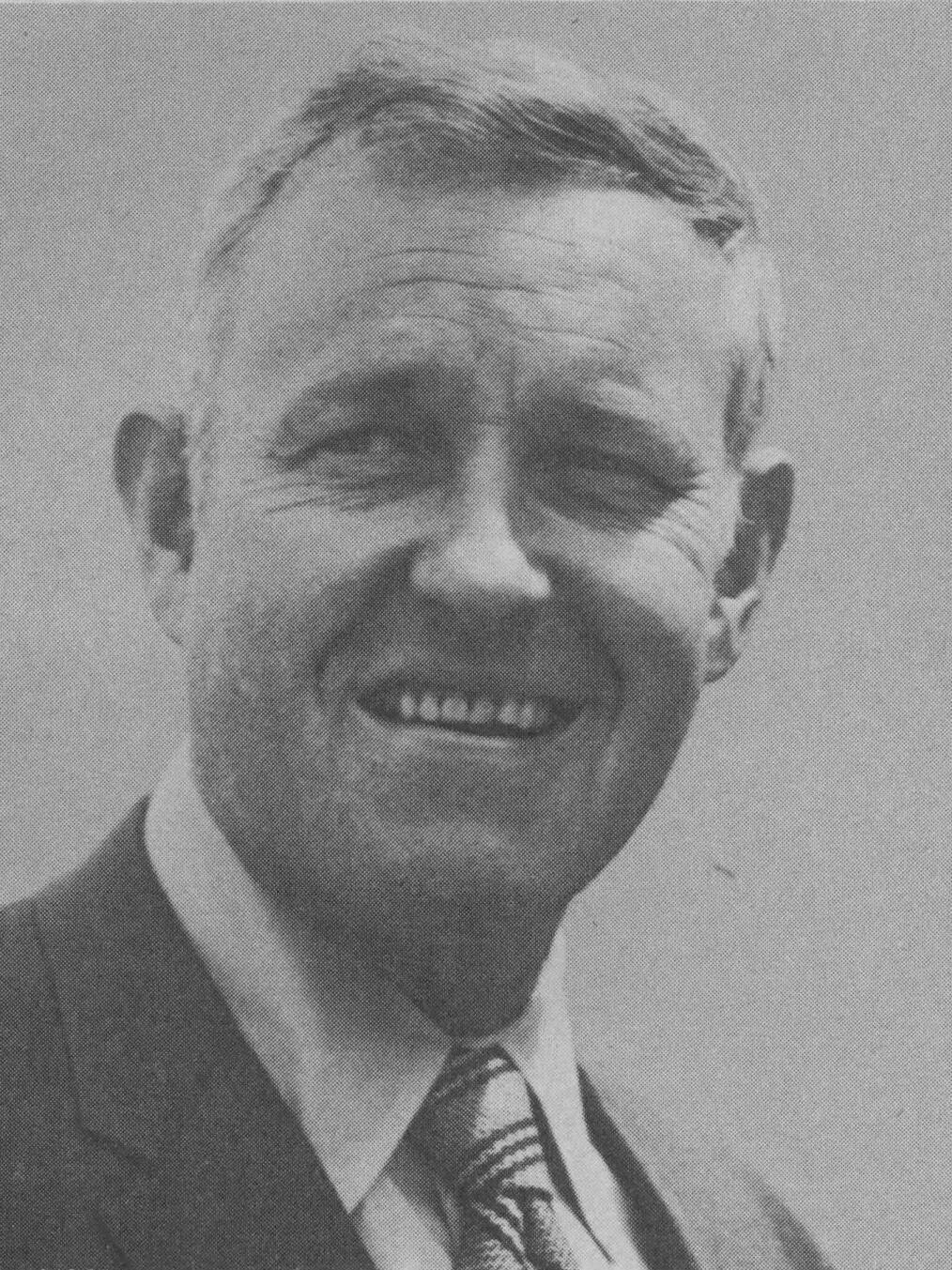
Tom McCall, KGW-TV's news commentator when it signed on, later served as Governor of Oregon.

KGW-TV had a local news department from the start. Richard Ross was the first main news anchor at 6:30 p.m. and news director, arriving from KING-TV. Ivan Smith, previously of KPTV, anchored the 11 p.m. Night Beat newscast. Jack Capell and Doug LaMear covered weather and sports, respectively. Tom McCall, already an editorialist on KGW radio, was signed as news commentator for the station's 6:30 p.m. early newscast. The early news was 30 minutes long at a time when the leading television news in the area, from KOIN-TV, lasted 15 minutes.

These news personalities had longevity and were later recalled as the best news team in Portland television history, a unit described by The Oregonian as "formidable" and a "news dynasty". KGW and KOIN fought for first place in the local evening news ratings race; KGW was surpassed by KOIN between 1967 and 1971, when KGW retook a narrow lead, which widened in the mid-1970s. McCall remained with the station until 1964, when he departed to run for Oregon Secretary of State; he was elected that November and served as Governor of Oregon from 1967 to 1975. Ross departed in 1975 to take the news director role at KATU, where he joined McCall. Smith retired in 1980. LaMear remained a sportscaster and outdoors show host from 1956 to 1991–with the exception of several days in May 1989 when he was fired and then reinstated by viewer demand. Capell continued to work in spite of ALS, first at noon and later on the weekend newscasts, until his retirement in 2000.

In the 1970s, KGW won two Alfred I. duPont–Columbia University Awards, the first Oregon station to do so, and became the third news organization to that time to be honored twice. In 1973, it won for Death of a Sideshow, a series profiling Portland's skid row. The station won again in 1978 for The Timber Farmers, a 15-part news series and documentary on the timber industry. A 1984 documentary, Rajneesh: Update, won the station a Peabody Award. Floyd J. McKay, who worked at KGW from 1970 to 1986, credited King Broadcasting and its president, Ancil Payne, with providing the support necessary to produce strong journalism.

By 1980, KGW was fighting for second place in local news ratings behind KOIN; it fell to third place a year later, after lengthening its 5 p.m. news to an hour, but had rebounded by 1984 to a tie for second in the 5 p.m. ratings and a lead at 11 p.m. A morning newscast debuted in 1985. By 1987, it was challenging KOIN for the lead.

However, in the years that followed, KGW slumped in the ratings, suffered from leadership turnover, and moved away from its traditional emphasis on politics and government reporting. McKay attributed this development to the 1986 retirement of King Broadcasting president Ancil Payne and the 1989 death of Dorothy Bullitt. Under news director Dave Wenstrand, who arrived from King Broadcasting–owned KREM in Spokane in 1989, the morning newscast was expanded to an hour. A 4 p.m. newscast, First at Four, debuted in 1990 as the market's first newscast in the time slot but was eliminated the next year as part of station-wide cutbacks that saw the dismissal of 25 employees; in 1992, KGW instituted Portland's first Saturday morning TV newscast. But ratings for KGW's newscasts fell; the 5 p.m. news had fallen to fourth behind comedies on KPTV, and Wenstrand was dismissed in April 1992. At the end of the year, under new news director Brink Chipman, longtime evening anchor Pete Schulberg was dismissed and his contract not renewed in response to continued low ratings. Two consecutive news directors—Chipman and Steve Tuttle—each lasted nine months before departing. Under Tuttle, a Sunday morning newscast was introduced to pair with the Saturday morning news.

Providence Journal dispatched Mike Rausch, the news director of co-owned WHAS-TV in Louisville, Kentucky, to Portland in hopes of turning around the KGW newsroom, with its low morale and low ratings. Under Rausch, the station became newly aggressive as it aimed to compete with then–market leader KATU. The evening newscasts were rearranged into 5, 6, and 6:30 p.m. half-hours; the 6:30 p.m. hour was new and provided competition to KATU, which had the only newscast in the time slot. The station rebranded from "News 8" to "Northwest NewsChannel 8". Budget cuts were replaced with more financial support from corporate. The next year, the morning news was extended to 5:30 a.m.; Providence Journal launched Northwest Cable News, a regional cable channel utilizing the resources of the King Broadcasting stations including KGW; and KGW debuted a helicopter, Sky 8, for newsgathering. KGW began to make inroads on KATU in the news ratings, moving up to second place by May 1995. Sky 8 was the first news helicopter in the world fitted with an infrared camera, provided by Portland-based FLIR Systems. in September 1995, it pursued a fugitive that law enforcement officials had been trying to apprehend, helping sheriff's deputies make an arrest, and it was used in other police operations until the practice was ended by Belo after it purchased Providence Journal. Under Rausch, Sky 8 was a major promotional tool that Schulberg, who after leaving KGW became the media critic for The Oregonian, called "the station's trademark". By the time Rausch departed in 1998, KGW had unseated KATU from number-one in several newscasts.

In 1999, the morning newscast was extended again to two hours, and the weekend morning newscasts were lengthened. That year, the station was running neck-and-neck with a resurgent KOIN in the evening news ratings. By February 2001, it was winning in all news timeslots except noon after a sustained increase in viewership. When KGW managed KPXG-TV, the station provided newscasts for air on channel 22, initially reruns of its 6 and 11 p.m. newscasts and, from January 2003 to October 2005, a live 10 p.m. newscast. When the agreement ended, the 10 p.m. news moved to Portland's WB affiliate, KWBP-TV (channel 32).

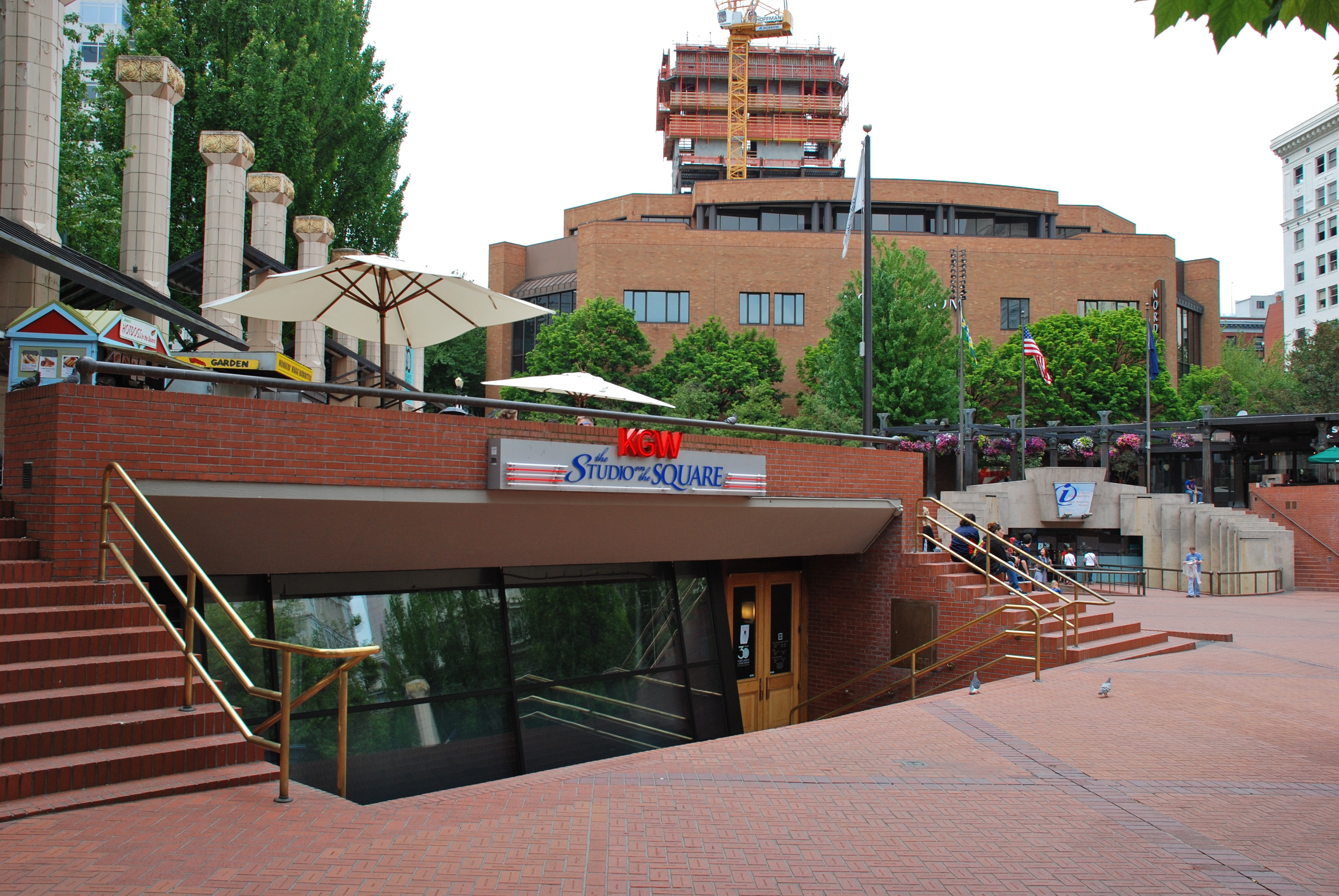
Exterior of KGW's "Studio on the Square" at Pioneer Courthouse Square

On January 21, 2008, KGW became the first television station in the Portland market to begin broadcasting its local newscasts in high definition. The station developed a high-definition news studio in downtown Portland at Pioneer Courthouse Square, in a space previously occupied by Powell's Books. Regular broadcasts from the location that KGW named the "Studio on the Square" began on March 17, 2009. KGW's noon newscast and Live at 7 originated from the downtown location. While KGW continued to have the number-one 11 p.m. newscast during this time, KPTV's 10 p.m. news surpassed it in total viewers.

When The Oprah Winfrey Show ended production in 2012, KGW debuted a 4 p.m. newscast, originally anchored from the Studio on the Square. Two years later, it put Sky 8 up for sale and began sharing a helicopter with KPTV. During the 2010s, it slowly lost its lead in news timeslots. In 2014, KOIN narrowly attracted more viewers than KGW at 11 p.m., while KATU surpassed it at 6 p.m. KGW's 10 p.m. news for KWBP, which became KRCW-TV in 2006, ended in September 2019 when that station was sold to Nexstar Media Group, owner of KOIN. By 2021, KGW was tied for second at 11 p.m. with KPTV in late news, but KPTV's 10 p.m. newscast had higher ratings.

=== Sports programming ===
In 1992, the NBA's Portland Trail Blazers moved their broadcast TV rights to KGW after 10 seasons with KOIN, giving the station a package of 20 regular-season road games. The move was significant for KGW as the Blazers had boasted the highest local TV ratings in the league for 14 years. After the initial three-year deal, the two parties renewed in 1995; KGW continued to be associated with the Trail Blazers through the 2016–17 season, airing between 16 and 26 games a season. During the period when it managed KPXG, some Blazers games aired on that station. The relationship ended when the Blazers designated the cable channel Comcast SportsNet Northwest as their exclusive television home in 2017.

Since 2024, KGW also airs a small number of non-national Seattle Kraken games; the remaining games air on the station's second subchannel.

=== Non-news local programming ===
KGW airs The Good Stuff, a weeknight 7 p.m. program that debuted in July 2020. It replaced Tonight with Cassidy, an entertainment program put on hiatus due to the COVID-19 pandemic. In 2022, the KGW sales and marketing department began producing Hello, Rose City!, a daily 11 a.m. lifestyle program featuring community issues and sponsored segments.

== Notable on-air staff ==
=== Current ===
- John Canzano – commentator on Sports Sunday

=== Former ===
- Ken Ackerman – sports reporter, 1989–1991
- Steve Bartelstein – sports director, 1994–1996
- Jim Compton – investigative reporter, 1976–1980
- Colin Cowherd – sports director, 1996–2004
- Ann Curry – reporter and weekend anchor, 1981–1984
- Lew Frederick – reporter, 1977–1993
- Joey Harrington – part-time reporter, 2016–
- C. W. Jensen – reporter, 2001–2003
- Eric Johnson – sports director, 1989-1993
- Shawn Levy – film critic, 2009–2016
- Paul Linnman – host of Evening and PM Magazine (1978–1983)
- Ron Magers – 11 p.m. anchor, 1967–1968
- Cathy Marshall – reporter, anchor and managing editor, 2011–2022
- Tom McCall – commentator, 1956–1964
- Brian McFayden – morning and Live at 7 anchor, 2016–2017
- Steve Pickett – reporter, 1990s
- John Stossel – reporter, 1969–1973
- Maggie Vespa – reporter, 2014–2022

== Technical information and subchannels ==
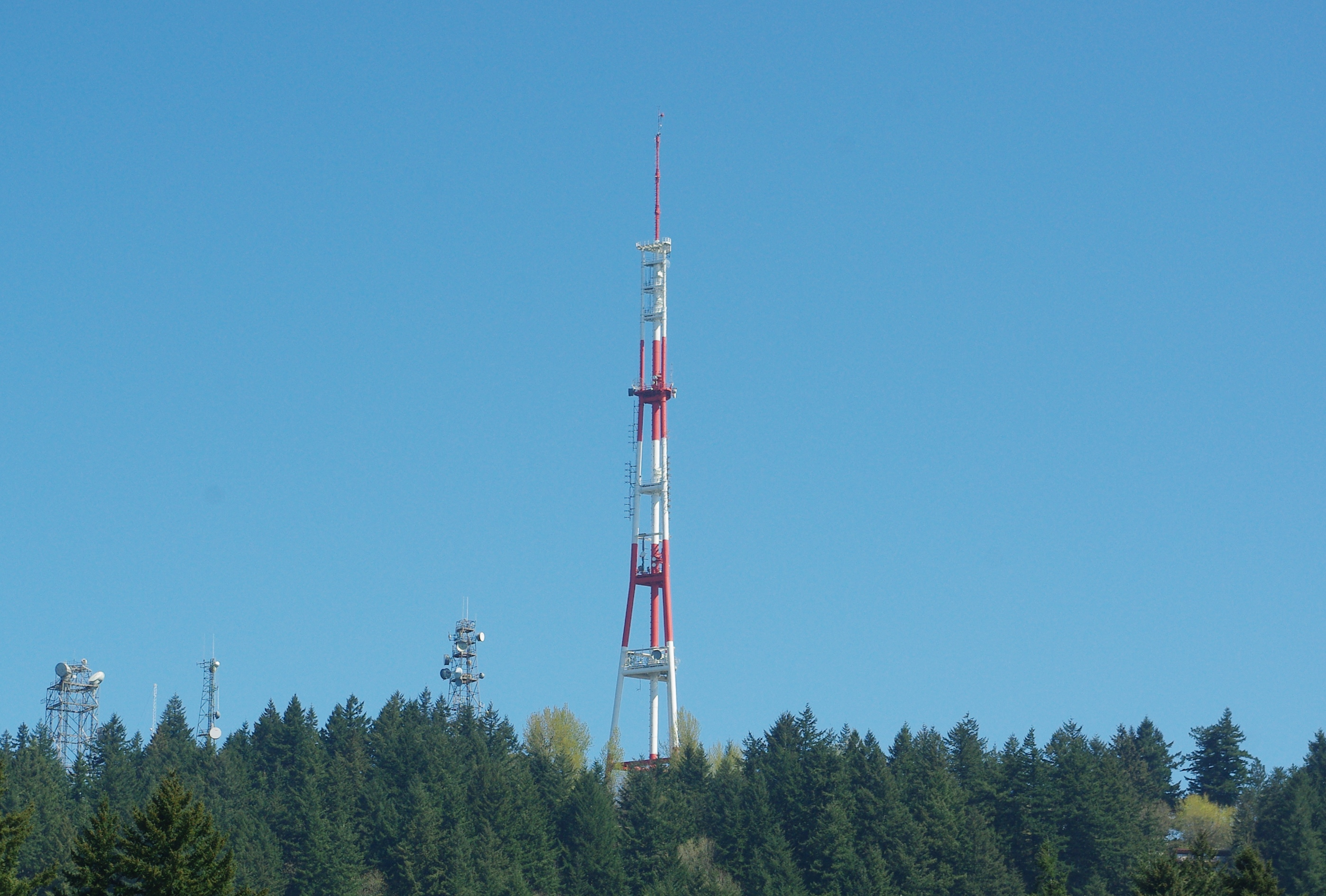
KGW's transmitter tower

KGW broadcasts from a transmitter in the Sylvan-Highlands neighborhood of Portland. The station's signal is multiplexed:

Subchannels of KGW
Subchannel	Res.	Short name	Programming
8.1	1080i	KGW	NBC
8.2	480i	Quest	Quest/sports programming
8.3	480i	Crime	True Crime Network
8.5	480i	NOSEY	(Blank)
49.2	480i	Mystery	Ion Mystery (KPDX)
49.4	480i	CourtTV	Court TV (KPDX)

Broadcast on behalf of another station

KGW began broadcasting a digital signal on February 4, 2000, using UHF channel 46. The station shut down its analog signal on the date of June 12, 2009, and moved its digital signal to VHF channel 8. While it was anticipated at the time that the move to VHF would improve reception, it did not, resulting in regular complaints to the station. As a result, in 2020, Tegna applied to move KGW to UHF channel 26. The station moved on July 16, 2021.

=== Translators ===
KGW's signal is rebroadcast over the following translators in Oregon and southwest Washington:

- Astoria: K17HA-D
- Baker Valley: K30OF-D
- Corvallis: K16ML-D
- Grays River, Washington: K35HU-D
- Hood River: K34KE-D
- La Grande: K26FV-D (Mount Fanny), K28NY-D (Mount Harris)
- Newport: K29AZ-D
- Pendleton: K36DP-D
- Prineville, etc.: K19LT-D
- Rainier: K36OJ-D
- Rockaway Beach: K17NJ-D
- The Dalles: K25KS-D
- Tillamook: K28MJ-D
- Walla Walla, Washington: K19KU-D

== See also ==
- List of three-letter broadcast call signs in the United States
