= Tim Joyce =

American meteorologist and newscaster

Tim Joyce is an American meteorologist and newscaster on Chicago's WGN-TV. He was formerly at KCPQ in Seattle. He also presented weather and traffic for the Portland, Oregon-based station KRCW (NW32) on the "Portland's Morning News" program, which is part of the nationally broadcast "Eye Opener" morning program. Previously, he worked at several other television stations, including nine years in the Eugene, Oregon, area and almost seven at the CBS affiliate KOIN, in Portland. Tim Joyce was one of the few openly gay television personalities on-air in the Pacific Northwest.

== Education ==
Joyce was born in Chicago. He attended the University of Kansas, majoring in journalism and also working for campus radio station KJHK-FM while there. Later, while working in Eugene, Oregon, he studied meteorology at Mississippi State University, earning a Certificate of Broadcast Meteorology with advanced standing, in 2003.

== Career ==
Joyce's first job on-air was at KTKA-TV in Topeka, Kansas. In 1995, Joyce moved to Eugene, Oregon, where he worked for KVAL-TV. In 2000, Joyce began working for KMTR-TV in neighboring Springfield. He co-hosted the morning show for the NBC affiliate which became the number-one morning show in the Eugene/Springfield area. He worked as a meteorologist for Portland, Oregon, CBS affiliate KOIN from 2004 until April 2011. In November 2011, he began working at Portland station KRCW (NW32), on its then-new "Portland's Morning News" program. He has also worked for Seattle-based Northwest Cable News. On June 19, 2021, WGN announced that Joyce will be starting on July 3, 2021, as the new weekend morning meteorologist he will be replacing Former WGN Meteorologist Mike Hamernik who died in March.
