= Jeff Gianola =

American new anchor

Jeff Gianola (born October 2, 1955) is a retired news anchor who worked for two network affiliate stations in Portland, Oregon.

== Career ==
Gianola grew up in San Diego, California, and came to Portland's KATU, the city's ABC affiliate, in 1983 from a stint at a Santa Barbara, California, station where he was the general-assignment reporter. After doing the weather and morning anchoring at KATU for a few years, he was moved to evening anchor in 1985. He was teamed with Julie Emry, and the pair co-anchored KATU's evening newscasts for several years in the late 1980s and 1990s. Gianola left KATU for CBS affiliate KOIN, in August 1998. In September 1999, Gianola wrote, produced and starred in "Quick Tips for Easy Living", a lifestyle program that aired Saturday afternoons on KOIN. The program was cancelled in October 1999. Gianola's news partner was Anne State until she left broadcast news to care for her parents in April 2015. In 1996, Gianola produced the documentary "No Perfect Answers: The Life and Architecture of Pietro Belluschi".

Gianola played a television news reporter in the 2003 William Friedkin film The Hunted. His name appears in an advertisement on the sides of the train in several scenes. He also had a cameo in the 1999 Kelley Baker film Birddog.

Gianola anchored the CBS Weekend News on the weekend of May 16–17, 2020, during a period when the network's broadcast center in New York City was closed because of the COVID-19 pandemic and its affiliate stations performed substitute anchor duties, from their own studios, on weekends for a time.

In July 2025, Gianola announced that he plans to retire in October 2025.

== Personal ==
Gianola is the father of five children; two girls from a previous marriage and three children with his current wife, Shannon. The family lives in Tigard. Gianola is the president and founder of the Wednesday's Child Foundation. This foundation helps to raise funds for children in foster care to participate in activities such as camps, lessons, and sports teams.
