= Ken Ackerman =

American television news anchor and reporter

Ken Ackerman (born March 14, 1960) was an American television news anchor and reporter in California, North Carolina, Oregon and Washington.. Born in Dover, New Jersey, Ken attended High School in Olympia, WA and eventually settled in the Pacific Northwest. Upon graduation in 1983 from the University of Southern California with a bachelor's degree in Sports Broadcast Journalism, Ken began his television career in California and then North Carolina where Ken was awarded several Associated Press awards with WITN-TV and WXII-TV in Winston-Salem. Ken made his way back to the Northwest in 1989 where he spent the rest of his career as a fixture on Portland television as a sports anchor/reporter on the NBC affiliate KGW. In 2003 he was hired by the Fox affiliate KPTV, where he went on to earn four NW emmy nominations and an RTNDA national news directors honor as a feature reporter. In 1996 Ken was chosen to become the first host of the FOX morning show Good Day Oregon. In 2003, ABC affiliate KATU hired Ken to host its morning show AM Northwest. Ackerman was also hired by Comcast as the studio host of Comcast Newsmakers interviewing state political and business leaders. In 2011, Ken became the lead anchor on KRCW's "Portland's Morning News", which aired as part of the nationally broadcast Eye Opener morning program. Ken filled in as a news & sports anchor on Fox 13 in Seattle. Ken retired from the media in 2016, and he and his wife Sally, opened a high-end consign & design company in Lake Oswego, OR called Oswego Trading Company. Ken & Sally divorced in 2019 and Ken moved to Florida where he is enjoying the next chapter of his life as a tennis pro at a country club in Palm Beach Gardens. Ken admits his biggest accomplishment is his son.
