= KVDO-TV =

Television station in Salem, Oregon (1970–1983)

Moved to Bend as KOAB-TV
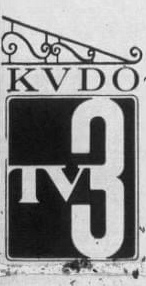
- Logo in the early 1970s, when channel 3 was a private commercial station
- Salem, Oregon; United States
- Channels: Analog: 3 (VHF)

Ownership
- Owner: Oregon Educational and Public Broadcasting Service; (The State of Oregon, Acting By and Through the State Board of Higher Education, For and On Behalf of the Oregon Commission on Public Broadcasting)

History
- First air date: February 24, 1970
- Last air date: July 31, 1983
- Call sign meaning: "K-Video"

Technical information
- ERP: 19.5 kW
- HAAT: 1,070 ft (330 m)
- Transmitter coordinates: 44°51′17″N 123°07′17″W

KVDO-TV (channel 3) was a television station in Salem, Oregon, United States, which operated from 1970 to 1983. Originally intended as a local independent station serving the Willamette Valley, financial considerations resulted in a contested sale to Liberty Television, owner of KEZI in Eugene, Oregon, in 1972. However, for media concentration reasons, the Federal Communications Commission (FCC) ordered KVDO-TV sold within three years. As a result, the Oregon Educational and Public Broadcasting Service (OEPBS) acquired KVDO-TV in 1976, resulting in a station that often—and controversially—duplicated OEPBS's transmitters at Portland and Corvallis.

In 1981, OEPBS applied to move channel 3, and KVDO-TV, from Salem to Bend, which at the time did not have public television service. The move was made in 1983, and the station was renamed KOAB-TV.

== History of channel 3 in Salem ==
Channel 3 was allocated to Salem in 1952 when the Federal Communications Commission (FCC) lifted the freeze on new television stations and reorganized many channel assignments. Two construction permits were awarded for the channel—neither built—before the KVDO-TV construction permit was awarded in 1969.

=== First construction permit ===
Oregon Radio, Inc., owner of radio station KSLM (1390 AM), immediately submitted an application for the channel, as well as for a television companion for co-owned KORE in Eugene. When a second application was filed by Willamette-Land Television, associated with KGAE (1340 AM) in Keizer and headed by Gordon Allen, both applications were placed in comparative hearing. Willamette-Land dropped out, enabling the FCC to grant Oregon Radio a construction permit on September 30, 1953.

Approval of a higher-power facility was stalled when a party attempted to move a channel 3 allocation from Lewiston, Idaho, to Richland, Washington, which would have left the proposed KSLM-TV short-spaced by just 0.5 miles of the minimum 190. Tower approval was still pending when it was announced on April 19, 1956, that the construction permit would be bought by then-UHF station KPTV (channel 27) at Portland to allow it to move to VHF. Storer Broadcasting, owner of KPTV, then announced plans to apply to move channel 3 to Portland, a move that would be contested by the three existing VHF stations there.

In response, Carl H. Fisher, owner of the Fisher Broadcasting group and owner of broadcast stations in Oregon and Washington, announced plans to file for a new permit. He argued that the failure of KSLM to build merited forfeiture of the construction permit. The commission refused the proposal in October.

With the FCC having turned down Storer's Portland move bid and the Fisher proposal, KSLM owner Glenn McCormick announced in May 1957 that he still intended to build the station if the FCC approved the tower plan. The next month, the FCC ordered Oregon Radio to go into comparative hearing against Fisher, who now owned local station KBZY (1490 AM). In February 1958, the FCC Broadcast Bureau ruled against another extension of the KSLM-TV permit. A hearing examiner agreed the next month. The full commission voted to deny further extension to Oregon Radio in March 1959.

As the KSLM-TV permit waned in 1958, Fisher and Allen showed renewed interest. Ultimately, however, four parties filed: Willamette-Land, Fisher, Oregon Faculties (owner of the KIEM stations in Eureka, California), and KPTV. Fisher and Oregon Faculties soon dropped out, the latter to avoid a lengthy and expensive comparative hearing. KPTV then withdrew in February 1961, citing the fact that its withdrawal could speed the activation of service in Salem, leaving Allen alone. However, financial and character qualifications continued to be a concern for the Allen bid, and the FCC denied it in February 1962, over the recommendation of a hearing examiner.

=== Second construction permit ===
With Gordon Allen's attempt having been denied, interest in the channel 3 allocation by other parties returned. One of the new entrants, Salem Channel 3 Telecasters, Inc., was owned by Don Wellman, who owned radio stations KGAL at Lebanon and KGAY at Salem. Other groups that had pushed for the channel at that time included former governor Robert D. Holmes, vice president of the Salem Television Co., Fisher Broadcasting, and Gordon Allen. By 1963, the applications of Salem Channel 3 Telecasters and Salem Television Company were pending at the FCC. The commission that year dealt a blow to both Salem applicants when it approved an application by Portland's KATU, channel 2, to move its transmitter south from Camas, Washington, which would have in turn required Salem channel 3 to be placed further south to meet minimum mileage separations between stations on adjacent channels.

Financial qualifications drove the comparative hearing between the two applicants. In May 1964, an FCC hearing examiner found that Salem Television Company was more financially qualified; the commission reaffirmed the finding in January 1965, stating that Salem Channel 3 Telecasters's construction plans and loan commitments were misrepresentations. The examiner found that Salem Channel 3 had "failed utterly" in its program proposal and would be less responsive to community needs.

As a result of the 1963 decision, and the fact that a Prospect Hill transmitter location would have placed too strong a signal in Portland to secure a network affiliation, Salem Television—which selected the call letters KVUE—proposed to place its transmitter on Vineyard Hill, north of Corvallis. That prompted protests from Eugene's two television stations, KEZI and KVAL-TV, who claimed that the technical proposal would have resulted in a new competitor in their market and asked for hearings on the application. After the request from the Eugene stations, Salem Television Co. surrendered its construction permit.

== KVDO-TV as a commercial independent ==
=== Channel 3, Inc. ===
On October 20, 1967, Channel 3, Inc., a consortium of 11 Salem residents, applied to the Federal Communications Commission for a construction permit to build a new television station in Salem, with the transmitter to be located on Prospect Hill southeast of town. The company was temporarily chaired by Urlin S. Page, owner of the Union Title Insurance Company. The FCC granted the permit on March 5, 1969, after Cascade Broadcasting, a group interested in filing for channel 3 at Eugene, withdrew its request to reallocate the channel. The grant required the FCC to waive minimum distance requirements to KATU.

Channel 3 selected the call letters KVDO-TV for its station and began building on Prospect Hill; the station leased a building on Portland Road for studios and offices. KVDO-TV began telecasting on February 24, 1970. The station went on the air as an independent, airing syndicated fare and a 10 p.m. newscast on weeknights. It had color broadcasting capability, though it aired many black-and-white programs, and there were no color film processors in Salem, further impeding color programs.

The station made its first sports broadcast that fall when it broadcast a game between McNary High School and Corvallis High School, which was also the first-ever telecast of a high school football game in the state. Station officials were pleased with the quality, but Corvallis High School noted a steep drop in gate revenue compared to other games that season.

By the station's first year, ratings were decent in Salem but poor in the Portland metropolitan area. The station had expanded its sports coverage to include live Oregon State Beavers men's basketball games, and it now produced two newscasts a day, but it was at a disadvantage competing against the Portland stations for syndicated programming. Cable services extended the station's coverage across much of the state, from Medford to Bend. When KOIN-TV's tower collapsed in March 1971, KVDO-TV stepped in on an emergency basis to carry CBS network programming until the Portland station could return to the air. In doing so, KVDO-TV extended its broadcast day beyond 3:30 p.m. for the first time, clearing the entire CBS schedule and moving its own local shows to fill gaps in the network lineup.

=== The contested KEZI sale ===
In August 1971, Channel 3, Inc., reached terms to sell KVDO-TV to Liberty Television, Inc., owner of ABC-affiliated KEZI in Eugene, in what was announced as a merger of the two stations. Harry Godsil, KVDO-TV president, noted that "the cost of operating a secondary market television station without a network affiliation has proven to be quite substantial", incurring heavy losses in 18 months of operation. At the time, it was noted that KVDO-TV would air local shows originating in Salem as well as KEZI local productions and ABC network programming. The sale would be structured as a stock swap valued at $410,000 and would see KVDO-TV only air five and a half hours a week of separate local programming.

The proposed sale, however, drew petitions to deny from KATU—the Portland ABC affiliate—and KOBI-TV in Medford. KATU's opposition concerned the network programming; the station noted that there would be an 82 percent overlap between KATU and KVDO-TV and suggested that channel 3 be relocated from Salem. KOBI-TV warned that Liberty and KEZI would gain "an undue concentration of economic power" were the sale to be approved; in addition to KEZI, Liberty owned AM and FM stations in Eugene and cable systems serving twelve communities in western Oregon, as well as a construction permit for a new Medford station. KVDO-TV and KEZI launched a petition drive to garner support for the merger among Salem residents.

In September 1972, the FCC approved the sale, waiving its signal overlap and cable cross-ownership rules, but attaching a condition that Liberty was to sell KVDO-TV within three years; in allowing the transaction, it cited the risk of a financial collapse of Salem's only television station. Two commissioners dissented. The unusual stipulation from the FCC came as a surprise to officials on both sides of the transaction; upon its closure, Godsil noted that KVDO-TV would not carry any ABC programs and would continue as an independent. The sale was completed in October.

== Sale to OEPBS ==
By October 1974, two years into the three-year period allowed by the FCC for KEZI to own KVDO-TV, Liberty Television began to scout potential uses for the station, which was not profitable. At that time, the company's board of directors was considering three options. One possibility was selling the station to a consortium of educational institutions led by Lane Community College, which would use it as a training ground for broadcasting students and to air additional educational programs not aired by the Oregon Educational and Public Broadcasting Service (OEPBS), the state's public television service. Chemeketa Community College took the lead by December when it was noted that Eugene's KVAL-TV had pledged $200,000 over four years to assist in the conversion of KVDO-TV to educational status. By January, the consortium had coalesced around Chemeketa, Lane, and Linn-Benton Community College. In newspaper letters to the editor published in February and March, Ron Wakefield of Corvallis cynically noted that KVDO's efforts to keep the station in Salem were helpful to Eugene stations including KEZI.

The Elections Committee of the Oregon House of Representatives recommended that the Oregon State Board of Higher Education purchase KVDO-TV in late February, only to have the board vote down the measure on a 5–4 vote; board chairman John Mosser, who cast the tie-breaking vote, said he was acting on the advice of its academic affairs committee. The next month, however, backers of a proposal to sell the station to OEPBS met with state legislative leaders. Despite maintaining its recommendation to not buy the station, in late March, the board authorized such a purchase if the state legislature were to appropriate the funds.

The bid to buy the station appeared dead, but it was revived in June by the Ways and Means Committee, which approved a measure authorizing the Oregon Emergency Board to administer the purchase. Under the bill, the state would pay $200,000 and be repaid in cash, so as to maximize tax benefits to Liberty Television. As the legislative session neared its end, SB 539 was approved by the Oregon State Senate days later. Under the plan, OEPBS would broadcast time-shifted public programs at different times to the network's Portland and Corvallis stations, and it would not be able to sell KVDO-TV to a commercial group for a certain period of time. The House approved SB 539 by a 31–28 vote, and Governor Robert W. Straub signed the bill on July 2. By this time, the station had cut down its schedule of programs to five and a half hours a day: an hour-long show known as Valley View, two newscasts, and a movie. The station also struggled technically in its final days as a commercial station, with frequent interruptions and outages.

=== Religious objections ===
The transaction was filed with the FCC on August 9, 1975, while the Emergency Board granted approval on September 12. However, two objections stalled FCC approval. One came from a shareholder in Liberty Television, while the other came from Rick Adams, the owner of a Salem Christian bookstore, who was concerned that the sale would mean several religious programs that the station had aired— particularly The 700 Club—would not continue after OEPBS took control. As one response to worries over program duplication, OEPBS committed to air 35 hours of unduplicated programming each week on the Salem station and amended its proposed program schedule to include religious shows in prime time. The Salem Area Chamber of Commerce voted to ask the FCC to call a public hearing, worried that there might not be another chance for a commercial TV station in Salem. Wakefield wrote another editorial asking, "Was State Purchase of KVDO A Mistake?"

The sale languished so long that Chemeketa Community College and Intercontinental Ministries, a Christian group based in Salem, had begun to ready bids if the OEPBS purchase fell through. Additionally, between 1974 and 1976, channel 3 had shrunk from 24 employees to eight.

On February 19, 1976, the FCC approved the sale to OEPBS. The state took control of the station that day and immediately began to introduce new programming, with an extended broadcast day and new lineup slated to debut March 1. The move caught the various religious ministries that broadcast on KVDO-TV, for two hours each evening and six hours on Sunday, off guard, and local ministries did not get the opportunity to say goodbye to their viewers.

=== Tower collapse ===
OEPBS's plans and the objections of the faithful, however, were quickly overshadowed. On the morning of February 28, the KVDO tower came crashing to the ground, evidently from a cut guy wire. Marion County officials arrested Ron Wakefield—whose editorials against the purchase had appeared throughout 1975—and charged him with criminal mischief; OEPBS estimated the damage at about $110,000, including structural damage to the transmitter building. Wakefield, when questioned, called himself a "self-proclaimed public avenger"; he felt that he had done all he could to protest the sale, remarking, "One must be prepared to pay the price if one engages in illegal protest." He then apologized to viewers in a letter written from jail.

Wakefield opted to plead guilty and was sentenced in May to five years in prison. He was paroled in October 1977, and he was found dead in the Willamette River in July 1978; his death was ruled a suicide.

Putting KVDO-TV back in commission was a tall order; while the state restoration fund would cover costs, neither the tower builder nor the antenna manufacturer had parts for repair, requiring the state to bid out a contract for new parts. The collapse also prompted the state to investigate asking the FCC to move channel 3 to Corvallis and channel 7 further south. In the meantime, The 700 Club—the most requested religious program that OEPBS planned to not air—was picked up by radio stations in Eugene and Salem.

In April, OEPBS announced a target date of September 20 to resume broadcasting and reiterated its plans to slate alternate programming on channel 3. As construction proceeded, a lawsuit by Intercontinental Ministries was dismissed, affirming the sale to the state, and another legal challenge was dropped. (Intercontinental's final appeal would be dismissed by a federal appeals court in July 1977.) In August, the new mast was topped off and the antenna placed, and the station met the target date to resume broadcasts.

== Public KVDO ==
When KVDO-TV returned to Salem screens, it did so with an alternative lineup of programs to that aired by the OEPBS transmitters in Portland and Corvallis, as well as the new station for La Grande. This included program productions from Salem: one program, the Valley View talk show, was held over from the station's commercial days. Channel 3 also offered Spanish-language programming, including Mexican movies, and PBS fare aired at alternate times to its showings on the rest of the OEPBS network. One challenge was that Liberty had taken with it some of KVDO's better equipment upon the sale, leaving older studio cameras in Salem. Some remote broadcasts, including the state legislative session and Oregon State Fair, also highlighted KVDO's first year as a public television station.

The state network also pursued potential new studio arrangements; while the Oregon state capitol did not have room for the station outside of the legislative session, plans were analyzed in 1978 to build a $410,000 studio at the Oregon State Fairgrounds. However, new thoughts of moving the station began to emerge. By 1979, the state's capital construction plans had channel 3 moving to central Oregon sometime between 1983 and 1985, a task made easier when the FCC designated KVDO-TV a noncommercial station that April. (Channel 22 was designated commercial as a result, resulting in its availability for future station KECH-TV.) The proposed site changes also played a role in defeating an attempt in the state legislature by representative Curt Wolfer to order the sale of the television station.

By 1980, the technical situation for KVDO had improved, with the Salem studios now boasting three color cameras; the talk show, which had been renamed from Valley View to Inner View and then Conversations, was still in production. The station was spared from 18 percent budget cuts to OEPBS later that year, with its staff of six continuing to lead the state network's legislative coverage.

=== 1981 cuts and move to Bend ===
However, the station was not spared in 1981. On April 1, the station ceased all separate local content, though it continued to break away from OEPBS on weekdays from 8 a.m. to 1 p.m. to air programs for schools. This slashed $10,000 from the $110,000 deficit of OEPBS. The plan went ahead despite concerns that it could violate the commitments made by OEPBS when it bought the station to avoid duplication of the rest of the network. One proposal had KVDO and KTVR at La Grande being closed altogether. The newly renamed Oregon Public Broadcasting (OPB) pressed ahead with plans to move channel 3 to Bend that June, announcing its intention to file an application with the FCC, though it received an offer in October from the owners of the construction permit for UHF television station KMTR (channel 16) in Eugene. KMTR would have bought channel 3 and moved it to Eugene in lieu of channel 16 while assisting OPB in building a UHF transmitter to serve the Bend area.

Bend UHF station KTVZ dropped its opposition to the KVDO move to Bend in March 1982, eliminating an obstacle; previously, the station had advocated for KVDO to move to UHF channel 15 in Bend. The FCC approved the reassignment of channel 3 to Bend on July 29, citing the opportunity to expand public television service to a previously unserved area and eliminate the short-spacing to KATU that had been associated with the Salem operation for its entire existence. The last opposition, from another tower owner at the proposed site on Awbrey Butte, withdrew its objection to Deschutes County's authorization of the new Bend tower in late June. KVDO-TV signed off for the final time from Salem at midnight on July 31, 1983. The equipment was dismantled and moved to Bend, where testing for the newly renamed KOAB-TV began on December 1.

== See also ==
- Oregon Public Broadcasting, for information on KOAB-TV and OPB since 1983
