= KUNP =

Television station in La Grande, Oregon

KUNP and KUNP-LD

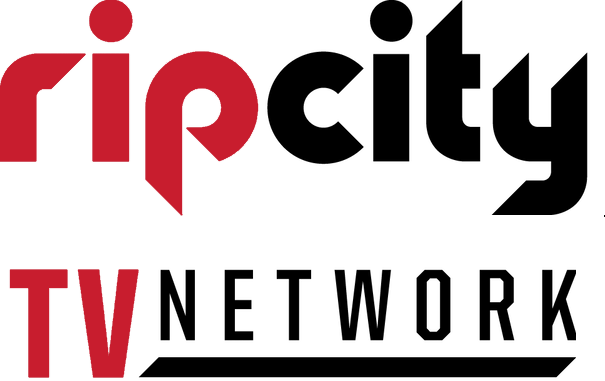

KUNP: La Grande, Oregon; KUNP-LD: Portland, Oregon; United States
- Channels for KUNP: Digital: 16 (UHF); Virtual: 16
- Channels for KUNP-LD: Digital: 34; Virtual: 47
- Branding: KUNP Portland; Rip City Television Network

Programming
- Affiliations: 16.1/47.1: Independent; for others, see § Subchannels

Ownership
- Owner: Sinclair Broadcast Group; (Sinclair LaGrande Licensee, LLC)
- Sister stations: KATU

History
- Founded: KUNP: August 6, 1999; KUNP-LD: May 18, 1993
- First air date: KUNP: December 3, 2001
- Former call signs: KUNP: KBPD (2001–2002); KPOU (2002–2006); KUNP-LD: K76AM (until 1994); K30EH (1994–2001); K57IF (2001–2004); KPOU-LP (2004–2006); KUNP-LP (2006–2012)
- Former channel number: KUNP: Analog: 16 (UHF, 2001–2009); KUNP-LD: Analog: 30 (UHF, 1994–2001), 57 (UHF, 2001–2003), 47 (UHF, 2003–2012); Digital: 47 (UHF, 2012–2018)
- Former affiliations: Univision (2001–2024)
- Call sign meaning: "Univision Portland" (former affiliation)

Technical information
- Licensing authority: FCC
- Facility ID: KUNP: 81447; KUNP-LD: 34882
- Class: KUNP-LD: LD
- ERP: KUNP: 18.95 kW; KUNP-LD: 15 kW
- HAAT: KUNP: 760 m (2,493 ft); KUNP-LD: 455 m (1,493 ft)
- Transmitter coordinates: KUNP: 45°18′32.4″N 117°43′57.7″W; KUNP-LD: 45°31′13″N 122°44′41″W
- Translator: KATU 2.2 Portland

Links
- Public license information: KUNP: Public file; LMS; KUNP-LD: Public file; LMS
- Website: kunptv.com

KUNP (channel 16) is an independent television station licensed to La Grande, Oregon, United States. It is owned by Sinclair Broadcast Group alongside Portland-licensed ABC affiliate KATU (channel 2). The two stations share studios on Northeast Sandy Boulevard in Portland; KUNP's transmitter is located east of Cove atop Mount Fanny, within eastern Oregon's Wallowa–Whitman National Forest.

Because of the location of its transmitter facilities 240 miles (390 km) east of downtown Portland, KUNP's over-the-air signal is unable to reach Portland proper. To overcome this, its signal is relayed on a low-power translator station, KUNP-LD (channel 47), which serves the immediate Portland area from a transmitter on Willamette Stone Park Road (near Skyline Boulevard) in the Sylvan-Highlands section of Portland, along with cable and satellite coverage folded into KATU's retransmission consent agreements to cover the market, along with some outlying areas. Additionally, KUNP is simulcast in full high definition on KATU's second digital subchannel.

== History ==
The station was founded on August 6, 1999, and formally signed on the air on December 3, 2001, as KBPD; it changed its call letters to KPOU on May 14, 2002. From the start, the station was an affiliate of the Spanish-language network Univision.

As KBPD and KPOU, the station was owned by Equity Broadcasting Corporation; it was acquired by Fisher Communications on November 3, 2006, for $19.3 million. Fisher would associate KPOU with KATU, the ABC affiliate it owned in Portland. Fisher changed the call letters to the current KUNP on December 5, 2006.

On August 21, 2012, Fisher Communications signed an affiliation agreement with MundoFox, a Spanish-language competitor to Univision that was owned as a joint venture between Fox International Channels and Colombian broadcaster RCN TV, for KUNP and Seattle sister station KUNS-TV to be carried on both stations as digital subchannels starting in late September. MundoFox would eventually rebrand as MundoMax in 2015 before ending all operations on December 1, 2016.

On April 10, 2013, KUNP, KATU, and Fisher Communications's other holdings were acquired by the Sinclair Broadcast Group. The Federal Communications Commission granted its approval of the deal on August 7, and the sale was completed the following day.

On May 8, 2017, Sinclair Broadcast Group entered into an agreement to acquire Tribune Media—owner of CW affiliate KRCW-TV (channel 32)—for $3.9 billion, plus the assumption of $2.7 billion in debt held by Tribune. Sinclair would have been required to sell one of KUNP or KRCW-TV if the deal were to be approved. However, in 2018, the FCC designated the deal for hearing by an administrative law judge; the deal was then terminated by Tribune.

On September 23, 2024, the Portland Trail Blazers announced a new television deal with Sinclair to create the Rip City Television Network. Under the deal, KUNP would begin airing Blazers games in January 2025. On September 26, Sinclair announced that KUNP would drop its Univision affiliation in 2025 to pivot the station to English-language programming, which in turn left the Portland market without a Univision outlet.

== Technical information ==
=== Subchannels ===
The station's signal is multiplexed:

Subchannels of KUNP and KUNP-LD
| Subchannel | | Res. | Short name | Programming |
| KUNP | KUNP-LD | Res. | Short name | Programming |
|---|---|---|---|---|
| 16.1 | 47.1 | 1080i | KUNP | Main KUNP programming |
| 16.2 | 47.2 | 480i | TheNest | The Nest |
| 16.3 | 47.3 | 480i | Charge | Charge! |
| 16.4 | 47.4 | 480i | ROAR | Roar |

=== Analog-to-digital conversion ===
Since KUNP did not sign on-the-air before the April 21, 1997, deadline for the FCC's digital television allotment plan, the station was not granted a companion digital signal. Therefore, on June 11, 2009, the station turned off its analog signal and turned on a new digital signal (a method known as a "flash cut") on UHF channel 16. KUNP-LP, as a low-power station, continued to broadcast in analog until April 13, 2012, when it made its flash-cut to digital transmission on UHF channel 47 and changing its call sign suffix from "-LP" to "-LD".

=== Former translators ===
KUNP also previously relayed its signal via analog translator KABH-LP (channel 15) in Bend. KABH was owned by WatchTV, Inc., alongside its crosstown Portland HSN affiliate KORK-CA, but was operated by Sinclair under a local marketing agreement (LMA). KABH-LP was founded on June 1, 1992, as K15DO, but did not take to the air until November 3, 1993. KABH's license was canceled by the FCC on March 19, 2015, for failure to file a license renewal application.

At one point, KUNP also had KKEI-CA as another translator prior to the Fisher acquisition. That station is now a Telemundo affiliate owned by WatchTV, Inc., which owned the now-defunct KABH-LP.
