= Exploding whale =

Phenomenon of a beached whale exploding due to explosives or decomposition

1970 whale explosion in Florence, Oregon, US, filmed by KATU news, one of the most widely reported cases of the exploding whale phenomenon. This explosion was intentionally caused using dynamite, but whale carcasses may also burst on their own.

There have been several cases of natural or intentional explosion of whale carcasses. Naturally, this occurs due to a buildup of gas in the decomposition process. This can occur when a whale strands itself ashore. Explosives have also been used intentionally by humans to assist in disposing of whale carcasses, ordinarily after towing the carcass out to sea, and as part of a beach cleaning effort. It was reported as early as 1928, when an attempt to preserve a carcass failed due to faulty chemical usages.

A widely reported case of an exploding whale occurred in Florence, Oregon, United States, in November 1970, when the Oregon Highway Division (now the Oregon Department of Transportation) blew up a decaying sperm whale with dynamite to dispose of its rotting carcass. The explosion threw whale flesh up to 800 feet (240 metres) away, and its odor lingered for some time. American humorist Dave Barry wrote about it in his newspaper column in 1990 after viewing television footage of the explosion, and later the same footage from news station KATU circulated on the Internet. It was also parodied in the 2007 American film Reno 911!: Miami, the 2018 Australian film Swinging Safari, and the 2010 The Simpsons episode, "The Squirt and the Whale". It has since been honored by the Eugene Emeralds of Minor League Baseball in 2023.

An example of a spontaneously bursting whale carcass occurred in Taiwan in January 2004, when the buildup of gas inside a decomposing sperm whale caused it to burst in a crowded urban area while being transported for a post-mortem examination. Other cases, natural and artificial, have also been reported in Canada, South Africa, Iceland, Australia, Denmark, and the United Kingdom. Artificial explosions have also been imposed by governments, and approved by the International Whaling Commission in emergency situations. However, it has also been criticized for its long-lasting odor.

== United States ==
=== Florence whale ===
External videos
- Exploding Whale 50th Anniversary, Remastered!, KATU

On November 9, 1970, a 45-foot-long (14 m) sperm whale washed ashore at Florence on the central Oregon Coast. The weight of the carcass was estimated at 8 short tons (16,000 lb; 7,300 kg). At the time, Oregon beaches were under the jurisdiction of the state's Highway Division, which, after consulting with the United States Navy, decided to remove the whale using dynamite – assuming that the resulting pieces would be small enough for scavenger animals to consume.

George Thornton, the engineer in charge of the operation, told an interviewer that he was not sure how much dynamite would be needed, saying that he had been chosen to remove the whale because his supervisor had gone hunting. A charge of one-half short ton (450 kg) of dynamite was selected. A military veteran with explosives training who happened to be in the area warned that the planned twenty cases of dynamite was far too much, and that 20 sticks (8.4 lb or 3.8 kg) would have sufficed, but his advice went unheeded.

The dynamite was detonated on November 12 at 3:45 p.m. A cameraman, Doug Brazil, filmed it for a story by news reporter Paul Linnman of KATU-TV in Portland, Oregon. In his voice-over, Linnman joked that "land-lubber newsmen" became "land-blubber newsmen [...] for the blast blasted blubber beyond all believable bounds". The explosion caused large pieces of blubber to land near buildings and in parking lots some distance away from the beach. Only some of the whale was disintegrated; most of it remained on the beach for the Oregon Highway Division workers to clear away. In his report, Linnman also noted that scavenger birds, who it had been hoped would eat the remains of the carcass after the explosion, did not appear as they were possibly scared away by the noise.

Days before the blast, a local explosive expert had purchased a new automobile in a "Get a Whale of a Deal" promotion. It was damaged by a chunk of falling blubber.

Ending his story, Linnman noted that "It might be concluded that, should a whale ever be washed ashore in Lane County again, those in charge will not only remember what to do, they'll certainly remember what not to do". When 41 sperm whales beached nearby in 1979, state parks officials burned and buried them.

Later that day, Thornton told the Eugene Register-Guard, "It went just exactly right. [...] Except the blast funneled a hole in the sand under the whale" and that some of the whale chunks were subsequently blown back toward the onlookers and their cars.

Thornton was promoted to the Medford office several months after the incident, and served in that post until his retirement. When Linnman contacted him in the mid-1990s, the newsman said Thornton felt the operation had been an overall success and had been converted into a public-relations disaster by hostile media reports.

The Siuslaw Pioneer Museum has bone fragments of the Florence exploding whale, called "Florence's most infamous moment" by local press. Currently, Oregon State Parks Department policy is to bury whale carcasses where they land. If the sand is not deep enough, they are relocated to another beach.

==== Renewed interest ====
The story was brought to widespread public attention by writer Dave Barry in his Miami Herald column of May 20, 1990, when he reported that he possessed footage of the event. Barry wrote, "… we watch it often, especially at parties." Some time later, the Oregon State Highway division started to receive calls from the media after a shortened version of the article was distributed on bulletin boards under the title "The Far Side Comes to Life in Oregon". The unattributed copy of Barry's article did not explain that the event had happened approximately 25 years earlier. Barry later said that, on a fairly regular basis, someone would forward him his own column and suggest he write something about the described incident. As a result of these omissions, an article in the ODOT's TranScript notes that:

"We started getting calls from curious reporters across the country right after the electronic bulletin board story appeared," said Ed Schoaps, public affairs coordinator for the Oregon Department of Transportation. "They thought the whale had washed ashore recently, and were hot on the trail of a governmental blubber flub-up. They were disappointed that the story has twenty-five years of dust on it."

Schoaps has fielded calls from reporters and the just plain curious in Oregon, San Francisco, Washington, D.C., and Massachusetts. The Wall Street Journal called, and Washington, D.C.–based Governing magazine covered the immortal legend of the beached whale in its June issue. And the phone keeps ringing. "I get regular calls about this story," Schoaps said. His phone has become the blubber hotline for ODOT, he added. "It amazes me that people are still calling about this story after nearly twenty-five years."

The KATU footage resurfaced later as a video file on several websites, becoming a viral video. A 2006 study found that the video had been viewed 350 million times across various websites. In 2020, residents of Florence voted to name a new recreational area "Exploding Whale Memorial Park" in honor of the incident; it also has a memorial plaque. For the 50th anniversary of the event, KATU pulled the original 16 mm footage from the archives and released a remastered edition of the news report in 4K resolution. Commemorating the anniversary as well, locals were reported to visit the beach and dress as whales.

Florence celebrates Exploding Whale Day annually at Exploding Whale Memorial Park. In 2024, the public was invited to build an altar for the exploded whale.

== Taiwan ==
Another whale explosion occurred on January 26, 2004, in Tainan City, Taiwan. This time the explosion resulted from the buildup of gas inside a decomposing sperm whale, which caused it to burst. The cause of the phenomenon was initially unknown, since it occurred in the spinal area of the whale, not in its abdomen as might be expected. It was later determined that the whale had most likely been struck by a large shipping vessel, damaging its spine and weakening the area, and leading to its death. The whale died after beaching on the southwestern coast of Taiwan, and it took three large cranes and 50 workers more than 13 hours to shift the whale onto the back of a truck.

Taiwan News reported that, while the whale was being moved, "a large crowd of more than 600 local Yunlin residents and curiosity seekers, along with vendors selling snack food and hot drinks, braved the cold temperature and chilly wind to watch workmen try to haul away the dead marine leviathan". Professor Wang Chien-ping had ordered the whale be moved to the Sutsao Wild Life Reservation Area after he had been refused permission to perform a necropsy at the National Cheng Kung University in Tainan. When it burst, the whale carcass was on the back of a truck near the center of Tainan, en route from the university laboratory to the preserve. The bursting whale splattered blood and entrails over surrounding shop fronts, bystanders, and cars. The explosion did not, however, cause injuries or prevent researchers from performing a necropsy on the animal.

Over the course of about a year, Wang completed a bone display from the remains of the whale. The assembled specimen and some preserved organs and tissues have been on display in the Taijiang Cetacean Museum since April 8, 2005.

== See also ==
- List of individual cetaceans
- Globster
- Tay Whale
- Exploding animal
