= KOIN Tower =

Building in Portland, Oregon, U.S.

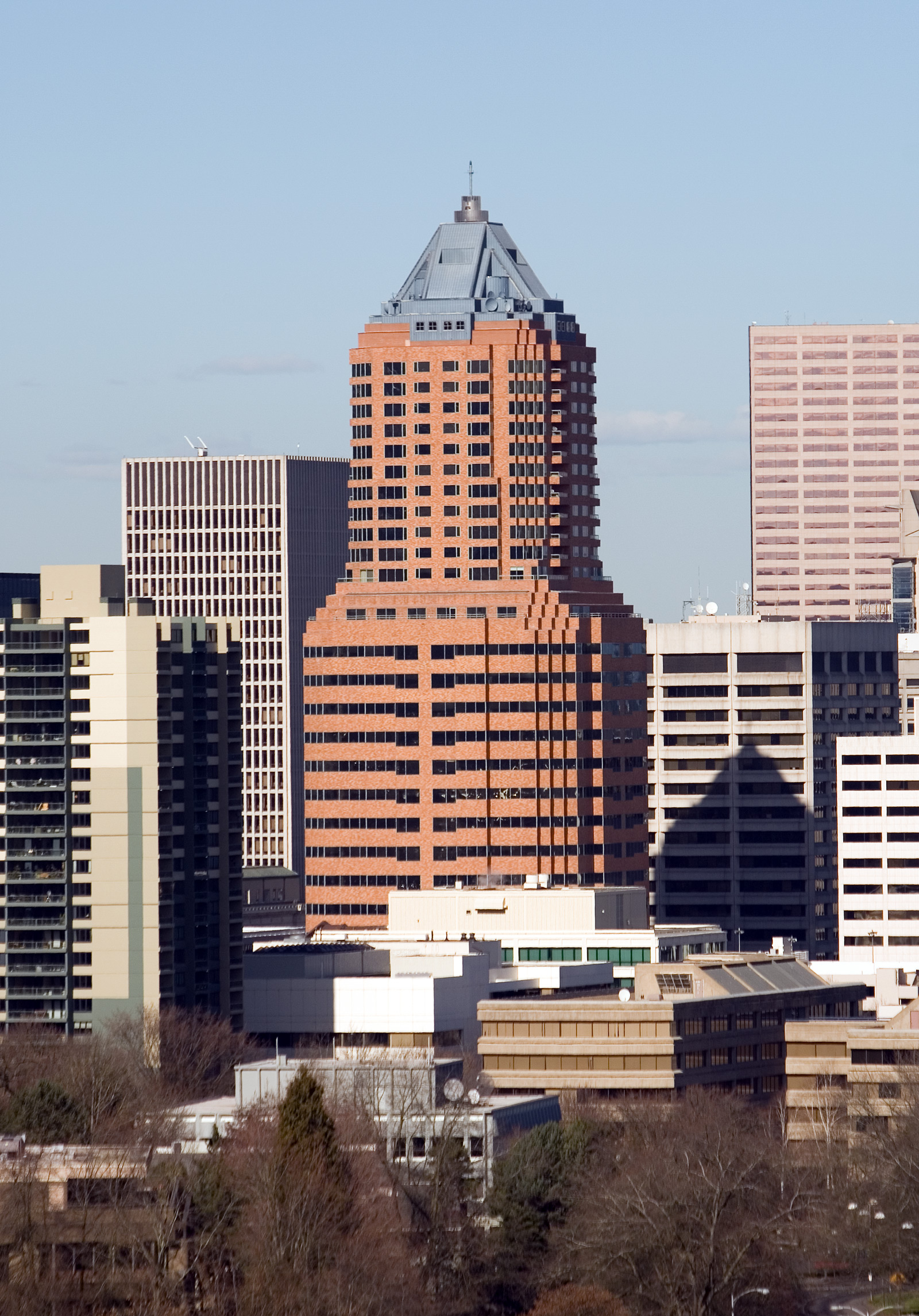

- Location within Portland, Oregon
- Alternative names: KOIN Tower

General information
- Type: Commercial offices Residential condominium
- Location: 222 SW Columbia Street; Portland, Oregon
- Coordinates: 45.5132°N 122.6779°W
- Completed: 1984
- Cost: US$48 million
- Owner: ScanlanKemperBard

Height
- Roof: 509 ft (155 m)

Technical details
- Floor count: 35
- Floor area: 39,019 m^{2} (420,000 sq ft)
- Lifts/elevators: 9

Design and construction
- Architect: Zimmer Gunsul Frasca Partnership

KOIN Tower (formerly KOIN Center) is a 155.15 m (509.0 ft), 35-story, skyscraper in Portland, Oregon, United States. The building, the third-tallest in the city, was designed by the firm of Zimmer Gunsul Frasca Partnership and opened in 1984 at a cost of US$48 million.

== History ==
The building was originally named Fountain Plaza, but it quickly came to be known as the KOIN Center reflecting the name of its highest-profile occupant, KOIN television, the CBS affiliate in Portland. The building was controversial while being constructed because its location blocked the view of Mount Hood that had long been seen by drivers emerging from the Vista Ridge Tunnels under Portland's West Hills going eastbound on U.S. Route 26.

KOIN Center was the first building completed in a projected three-block development sponsored by the Portland Development Commission (PDC) that also included the city blocks immediately to the north and east. The latter was the long-time location of the KOIN broadcast studios and offices, which relocated to the KOIN Center upon its completion. Of the additional projected buildings, only the Essex House apartments, occupying half of the northern block facing SW Third Avenue were completed, in 1992. A 15-story office building on the eastern block, 100 Columbia, was proposed but construction never commenced. This building has now been cancelled.

The PDC had a number of goals in sponsoring the Fountain Plaza project. One was to provide a link between the government and central business core of downtown and the nearly completed South Auditorium redevelopment district immediately to the south. This redevelopment project, initiated in 1960, had been the first for the PDC and, though controversial at the time, has been considered by some to be one of the nation's few successful such projects from that era. Reflecting that goal, the southwest entrance to the KOIN Center faces its own street-corner plaza diagonally across the intersection from the Ira C. Keller Fountain, making a visual and pedestrian connection that important public space. The Keller Fountain, built in 1970 and originally named the Forecourt Fountain in reference to the adjacent Municipal (now Keller) Auditorium, was described by New York Times architecture critic Ada Louise Huxtable as maybe "one of the most important urban spaces since the Renaissance." It is this fountain that gave the name to the KOIN Center project. A second goal of the PDC in proposing this mixed-use building was to promote the type of condominium apartment living common in the central business districts of large cities such as New York City and Chicago but not in Portland at the time.

The firm of Olympia & York of Oregon, a joint venture of Olympia & York Properties of Toronto and Arnon Development, both Canadian-owned, won the PDC competition for the Fountain Plaza project and completed the building in 1984. Between 1992 and 1995, the real estate holdings of Olympia & York of Toronto were auctioned off in bankruptcy court, with the KOIN Center going to an ownership group headed by the Louis Dreyfus Property Group (LDPG) in 1993. The LDPG owned the building until it was sold on July 3, 2007 to a group of California investors for US$109 million, a purchase that included the two remaining building sites for potential high-rise office and residential development. In August 2009, these investors, including the California Public Employees' Retirement System (CalPERS) and CommonWealth partners, surrendered control of the KOIN Center after defaulting on their mortgage of US$70 million from the New York Life Insurance Company. The condos on the upper floors are owned separately and were unaffected by the default.

In December 2009, Portland-based American Pacific International Capital purchased the office portion of the building for between $50 and $60 million, approximately half the US$109 million paid by CalPERS in 2007. ScanlanKemperBard bought the office tower for $88 million in January 2015. In 2016, the building underwent major upgrades, including a full renovation of the main lobby, improvements throughout the building and some vacant suites. The lobby is home to a 32-screen, 16 by 18 feet (4.9 by 5.5 metres) media wall. As part of the improvements, KOIN Center underwent a rebranding and was renamed KOIN Tower.

Following its departure from Hampton Opera Center in the Central Eastside, All Classical Radio officially opened its new headquarters in KOIN Tower on December 8, 2024. Located on the building's third floor, the facility has a total space of 15,000 square feet (1,400 square metres), which included five production studios, a music library, an art gallery, and a cafe.

== Design ==
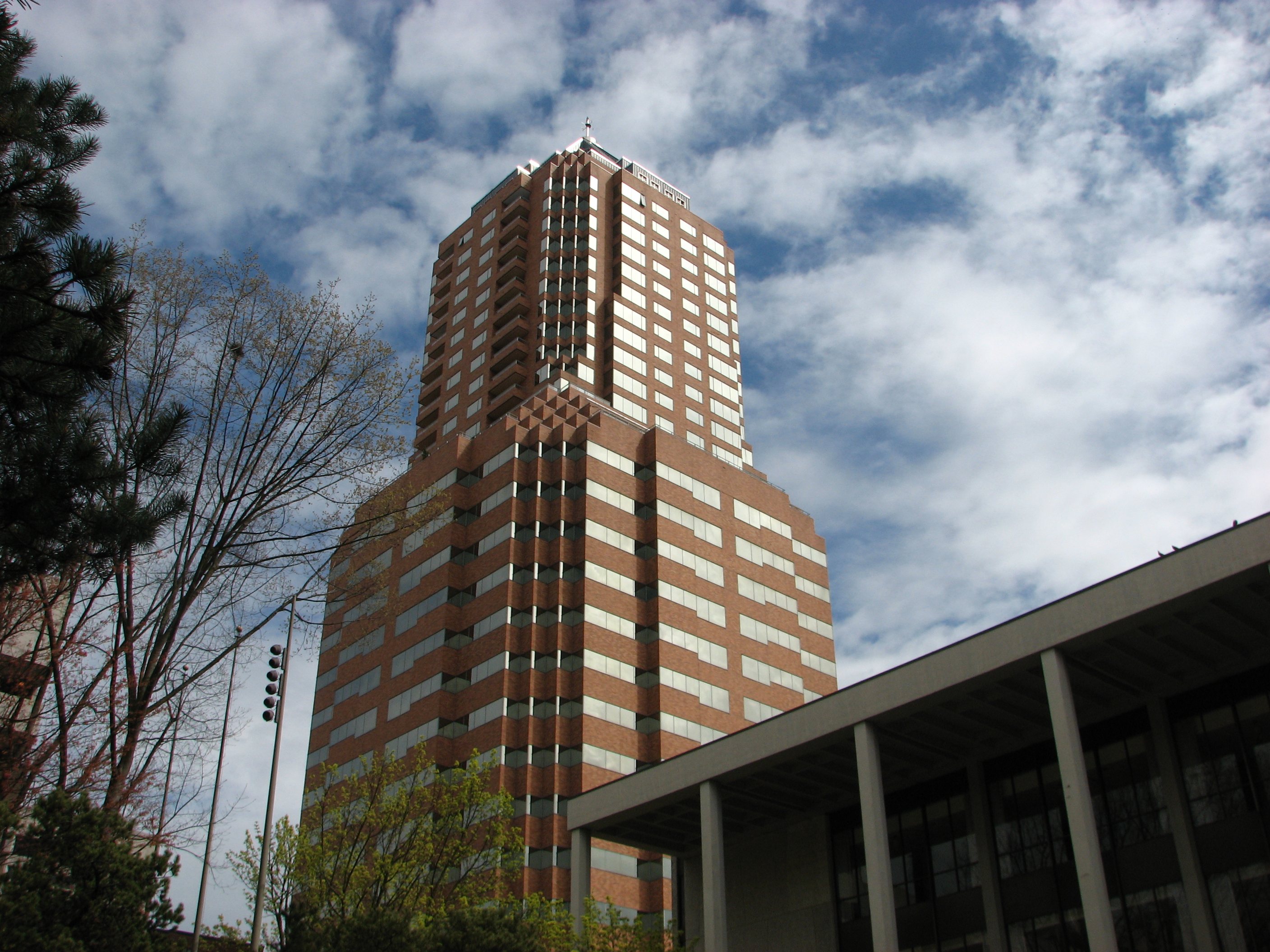
The center from below

KOIN Tower occupies an entire city block and is clad in orange brick and trimmed with white limestone at the base; the sloping roof forming the pyramidal crown is prefinished galvanized steel. The ziggurat-like profile and blue crown sets it apart from other buildings in downtown Portland and makes it instantly recognizable, "one of the most important things a downtown skyscraper can accomplish." The step backs in its footprint with increasing height and its multi-faceted form are reminiscent of the Art Deco skyscrapers of the 1920s, leading some commentators to describe its architecture as Neo-Art Deco. In addition to the KOIN broadcast studios and offices below grade, the building has three principal functional programs, each with its own entrance and distinctive facade—commercial/office on SW Columbia Street, retail and former theater space on the southwest corner, and residential condominiums on SW Third Avenue. In addition, a restaurant space has its own entrance on SW Clay Street. Thus, the building relates to its surroundings in several distinct ways. Of these, most important is the southwest corner as an extension of the public space represented by the Keller Fountain and adjacent Keller Auditorium. A feature unique in Portland, and resulting from the multi-block nature of the original project, is the location of the entrance to the underground parking and loading docks on the adjacent block to the east. This spares any of the four street frontages from accommodating a parking entrance or loading dock, a distinct design advantage for a building on one of the small 200 by 200 ft (61 by 61 m) blocks typical of downtown Portland.

The limestone at street level is rich with fossils — including sand dollars, byrozoa, and barnacles — as well as pieces of green chert.

== Tenants ==
There are four distinct uses for the KOIN Tower, each hosted in a separate part of the building. The first three floors house mixed retail and office space. The ground-floor restaurant space, originally occupied by a branch of the Seattle-based Thirteen Coins, is now the location of a Morton's The Steakhouse. Floors 4 through 19 are office space, with tenants including Skanska USA Building, First American Title Insurance, ECONorthwest, Helmy Law Firm PC, Evanta, Robert Half International, Schnitzer Steel, and others. The Fountain Plaza Condominiums occupy Floors 20 through 31. The studios and production facilities of KOIN and KRCW, Portland's CBS and The CW affiliates, occupy the basement and a portion of the ground floor. The blue spire crowning the building houses the equipment used for broadcasting radio and television signals. The building previously housed the six-screen KOIN Center Cinema, which closed in 2004 after 19 years in operation.

== See also ==
- Architecture of Portland, Oregon
- List of tallest buildings in Portland, Oregon
