= Cathy Marshall (news anchor) =

American broadcast journalist

- Born: Catherine Marshall; Eugene, Oregon, U.S.
- Education: Oregon State University
- Occupation: Television journalist
- Notable credit(s): CNN; NBC 7 Boston (WHDH); KATU Portland; KMTR Eugene; WTNH New Haven; KIRO Seattle; KGW Portland; KTVZ Bend
- Spouse: John Marler
- Children: 4

Catherine "Cathy" Marshall is an American broadcast journalist who has worked as a reporter and anchorperson. She has worked as an anchor for CNN and has also worked with news stations in Boston; New Haven, Connecticut; Seattle; and Eugene and Portland, Oregon; and as a sideline reporter for Fox Sports Northwest. At the beginning of 2010, Marshall joined the news team of MDiTV, a medical news network also based in Portland, as an anchor. In December 2011, she began working as a reporter and anchor at KGW-TV in Portland. In 2022, she began working as an anchor at KTVZ, and became the station's News Director in December, 2022.

Marshall and husband John Marler co-anchored newscasts in some cities, including at Boston's WHDH and Portland's KATU.

== Personal life ==
Marshall graduated with honors from Oregon State University in 1982 with a bachelor's degree in speech communications.

She is married to John Marler, also a news anchor, and the couple have four children.
