= KOIN =

Television station in Portland, Oregon

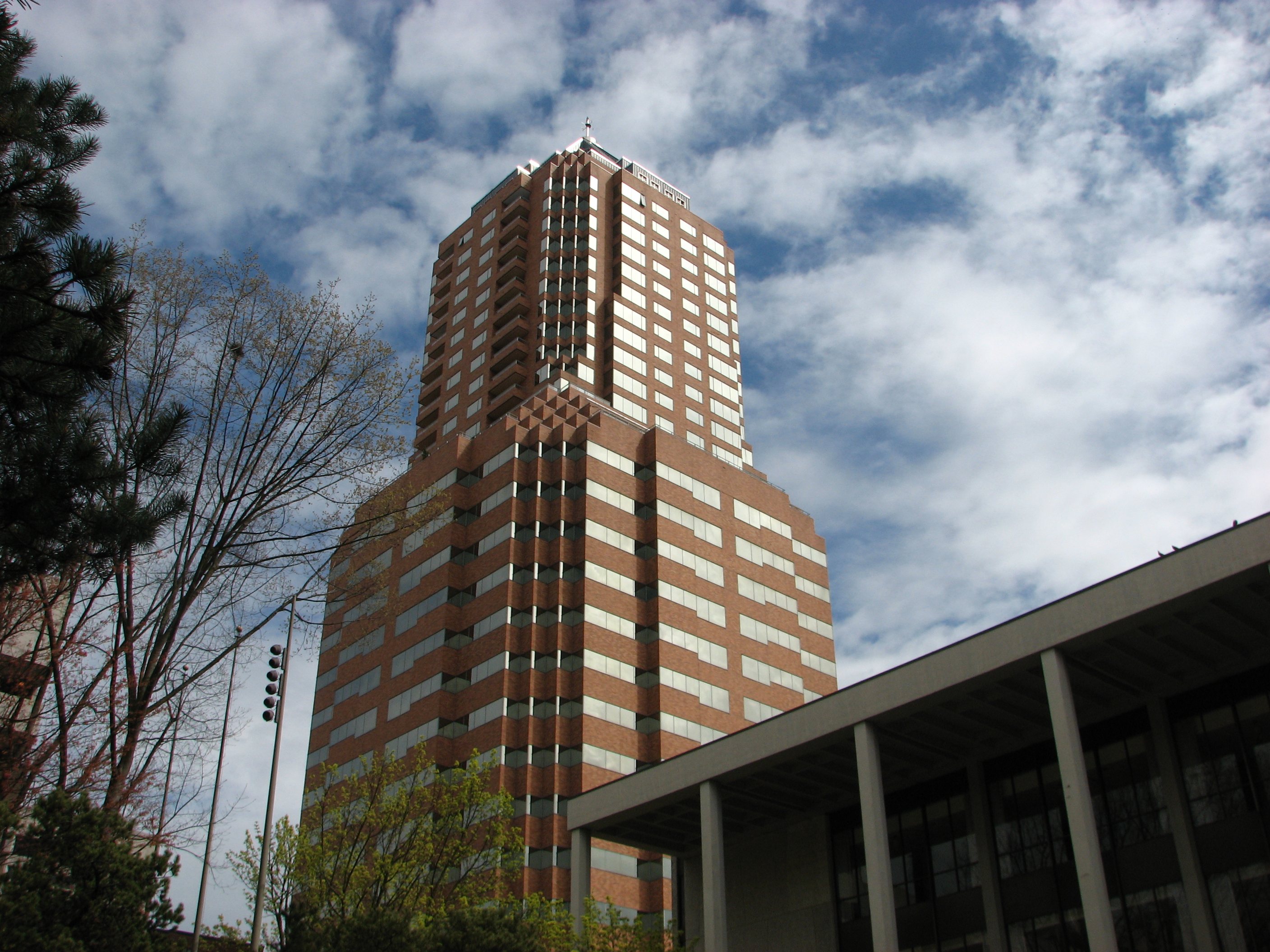
- The KOIN Center is the third-tallest skyscraper in Portland.
- Portland–Salem, Oregon; Vancouver, Washington; United States
- City: Portland, Oregon
- Channels: Digital: 25 (UHF); Virtual: 6
- Branding: KOIN 6 (pronounced as "Coin 6")

Programming
- Affiliations: 6.1: CBS; 6.2: Great; 6.3: Rewind TV

Ownership
- Owner: Nexstar Media Group; (Nexstar Media Inc.)
- Sister stations: KRCW-TV; Tegna: KGW

History
- First air date: October 15, 1953
- Former call signs: KOIN-TV (1953–1992)
- Former channel numbers: Analog: 6 (VHF, 1953–2009); Digital: 40 (UHF, 1998–2018)
- Call sign meaning: "Know Oregon's Independent Newspaper" (from The Portland News; later purchased by The Oregon Journal); sounds like "coin"

Technical information
- Licensing authority: FCC
- Facility ID: 35380
- ERP: 1,000 kW
- HAAT: 536.3 m (1,760 ft)
- Transmitter coordinates: 45°30′57.8″N 122°44′3.1″W
- Translator(s): see § Translators

Links
- Public license information: Public file; LMS
- Website: www.koin.com

KOIN (channel 6) is a television station in Portland, Oregon, United States, affiliated with CBS. It is owned by Nexstar Media Group alongside CW station KRCW-TV (channel 32); Nexstar's Tegna subsidiary owns NBC affiliate KGW (channel 8). KOIN and KRCW-TV share studios in the basement of the KOIN Center skyscraper on Southwest Columbia Street in downtown Portland; KOIN's transmitter is located in the Sylvan-Highlands neighborhood of the city.

== History ==
=== Radio origins ===
KOIN began as a radio station at 970 AM that went on the air November 9, 1925, as KQP; the station changed its call sign to KOIN on April 12, 1926. It became an affiliate of the Columbia Broadcasting System (CBS) on September 1, 1929. During the golden years of radio, KOIN was one of Portland's major radio stations, with an extensive array of local programming, including live music from its own studio orchestra.

As a CBS Radio Network affiliate, KOIN was the local home for CBS radio programs such as the CBS World News Roundup, Lux Radio Theater and Suspense. An FM station, KOIN-FM 101.1, was launched in 1948. Both stations were owned by Field Enterprises, Inc. from 1947 until sold in 1952 to the Mount Hood Radio and Television Broadcasting Corporation.

Radio stations KOIN and KOIN-FM were sold on May 1, 1977, to the Gaylord Broadcasting Company, and effective May 12, 1977, their call signs changed to KYTE and KYTE-FM, respectively. Its affiliation with CBS ended, and the CBS Radio Network's programming in the Portland market moved to KYXI in Oregon City at that time. The stations using the former KOIN frequencies currently are KUFO (AM) and KXL-FM.

=== Television station ===
KOIN-TV began broadcasting on October 15, 1953, as Portland's first VHF television station. It took on an affiliation with the CBS Television Network, to match the radio station (channel 6 has always been a primary CBS station, and as such, it is the only Portland TV station to retain its primary affiliation). At the time, it was jointly owned by Mount Hood Radio and Television Broadcasting Corporation; Newhouse Broadcasting Corporation (now Advance Publications), owner and publisher of The (Portland) Oregonian; local investors and Marshall Field's department stores. The station took its calls from KOIN radio (AM 970 and 101.1 FM), which was a joint venture of Mount Hood Broadcasting and Newhouse. Eventually, Marshall Field sold its stake to Newhouse. Lee Enterprises purchased KOIN-TV in April 1977 from the Mount Hood-Newhouse group.

KOIN's first color television broadcast was made on August 14, 1954, only three days after then-NBC-affiliate KPTV (channel 12) had made Portland's first such broadcast.

In the 1950s, KOIN ran a Sunday afternoon program, Report to the People, hosted by the governor of Oregon.

On February 27, 1971, both transmitter towers used by KOIN-FM and KOIN-TV—the 1,000-foot (300 m) main tower and the 700-foot (210 m) auxiliary tower—collapsed during an ice and wind storm. The two KOIN (AM) towers, located on the same property, were not damaged. Nine days later, on March 9, 1971, KOIN-FM and KOIN-TV returned to the air when a temporary tower was erected on the site of the collapsed auxiliary tower. During those nine days off the air, CBS programming was provided to the Portland market (and, by extension, most of Oregon) by independent station KVDO-TV in Salem.

During the 1970s, KOIN still had a handful of locally produced programs on the air, including RFD 6, Hi! Neighbor, the cooking show KOIN Kitchen, and public affairs programs such as News Conference Six and Northwest Illustrated. In 1976, KOIN-TV became the second television station in the Portland market (after KPTV) to broadcast Portland Trail Blazers basketball games. Select Blazers games aired on KOIN-TV until 1996, when the Blazers moved to KGW. KOIN was the first flagship station of the Trail Blazers' radio network, beginning in the inaugural 1970–71 season, and ending when the station was sold shortly before the Trail Blazers won the 1976–77 NBA championship, which was broadcast on KOIN-TV via CBS' coverage (KOIN also broadcast all Blazers games that were aired through CBS Sports from 1973 to 1990).

By the 1980s, one of KOIN's past general managers—Richard M. "Mick" Schafbuch—served one term in 1981 as President of the CBS Network Affiliates Group. In 1982, C. Stephen Currie, KOIN's program operations manager, was elected to serve as the president of the National Association of Television Program Executives. During KOIN-TV's 30th anniversary week in 1983, the station aired classic CBS programming from the 1950s and 1960s. By this time, the station had moved into its new location at KOIN Center. In 1984, the station aired the Japanese program From Oregon With Love. The "-TV" suffix was dropped on August 31, 1992, fifteen years after KOIN radio was sold off.

In October 2000, the Lee Enterprises television group, including KOIN was purchased by Emmis Communications. On January 27, 2006, Emmis sold KOIN (along with KHON-TV in Honolulu, Hawaii, KSNT in Topeka, Kansas, and KSNW in Wichita, Kansas) to Montecito Broadcast Group for $259 million.

On July 24, 2007, Montecito announced the sale of all of its stations (KOIN, plus KHON-TV and its satellites, KSNW and its satellites, and KSNT) to New Vision Television. The sale closed on November 1, 2007.

In October 2008, KOIN converted its central Oregon translators into a locally focused semi-satellite, KBNZ, which was sold off in 2010. On December 30, 2008, one of the 15 guy wires on the station's main transmitter tower snapped, putting the tower in danger of collapsing (as with the 1971 tower collapse, this incident followed a prolonged snow and ice storm). The Portland Police Bureau evacuated about 500 local residents and closed several roads around the tower, including a portion of Skyline Boulevard, the main north-south road through the West Hills of Portland. At first, officials feared that the wire itself—which is over 1,000 feet (300 m) long and weighs several tons—had snapped, which would have taken several weeks to manufacture and install a replacement. Upon inspection, it was revealed that one of the high frequency insulators incorporated into the guy wire assembly had shattered. Repair crews replaced the insulator by 4 p.m. the next day and the surrounding neighborhood was reopened to residents and car traffic. New Vision Television paid a $1,500 fine to the Federal Communications Commission (FCC) due to equipment neglect.

On May 7, 2012, LIN Media announced that it would acquire KOIN and the other New Vision stations for $330.4 million and the assumption of $12 million in debt. The FCC approved the sale on October 2, and it was completed ten days later on October 12, 2012. The group deal reunited KOIN, KHON, KSNW and KSNT with several former Emmis-owned stations which had been purchased by LIN seven years earlier, such as KRQE in Albuquerque, New Mexico, WALA-TV in Mobile, Alabama, and WLUK-TV in Green Bay, Wisconsin (KOIN, KRQE, KSNW, and KSNT had also been sister stations under Lee Enterprises).

On March 21, 2014, Media General announced that it would purchase LIN Media and its stations, including KOIN, in a $1.6 billion merger. The merger was completed on December 19. Less than a year later, on September 8, 2015, Media General announced that it would acquire the Meredith Corporation for $2.4 billion, with the combined group to be renamed Meredith Media General once the sale is finalized by June 2016. Because Meredith already owns Fox affiliate KPTV (channel 12), and the two stations rank among the four highest-rated stations in the Portland market in total day viewership, the companies would have been required to sell either KPTV or KOIN to comply with FCC ownership rules as well as recent changes to those rules regarding same-market television stations that restrict sharing agreements; KPTV's MyNetworkTV-affiliated sister station KPDX (channel 49) could have remained with either KPTV or KOIN or be spun off to the suitor as its total day viewership ranks below the top-four ratings threshold.

However, the proposed deal with Meredith would later fall through, and on January 27, 2016, it was announced that Nexstar Broadcasting Group would buy Media General for $4.6 billion. KOIN became part of "Nexstar Media Group" and is the company's first station in Oregon.

On December 3, 2018, Nexstar announced it would acquire the assets of Chicago-based Tribune Media—which has owned CW affiliate KRCW-TV (channel 32) since 2003—for $6.4 billion in cash and debt. Nexstar included the overlap between KOIN and KRCW-TV among the television stations in thirteen markets where the group may consider making divestitures to address national ownership cap issues related to the Tribune transaction and/or to comply with FCC local ownership rules preventing it from owning two or more stations in the same market. However, KRCW does not rank among the four highest-rated stations in the Portland market in total day viewership, and FCC regulations no longer preclude legal duopolies that would leave fewer than eight independently owned television stations in a single market (a KOIN/KRCW combination would leave only seven full-power commercial television stations with independent ownership remaining in the market, barring a second legal duopoly in the market under the previous "eight-voices test" rules repealed by the FCC in November 2017), hence there are no legal hurdles in place which would otherwise preclude a KOIN/KRCW duopoly. The sale was approved by the FCC on September 16 and was completed on September 19, 2019.

On August 19, 2025, Nexstar Media Group agreed to acquire Tegna for $6.2 billion. In Portland, Tegna already owns KGW. The transaction was completed on March 19, 2026. Nexstar was allowed to hold three TV station licenses in markets such as Portland. A temporary restraining order issued one week later by the U.S. District Court for the Eastern District of California, later escalated to a preliminary injunction, has prevented KGW from being integrated into KOIN and KRCW.

== News operation ==
KOIN presently broadcasts 43 1/2 hours of locally produced newscasts each week (with 5 1/2 hours each weekday and 2 1/2 hours each on Saturdays and Sundays). On February 1, 2007, KOIN became the first television station in the Portland market to being broadcasting its local newscasts in 16:9 widescreen standard definition. According to Oregon Media Insiders, during Montecito's ownership of KOIN, its local news ratings declined in all time periods; among the four news-producing stations in the Portland market, KOIN had the greatest loss in audience share.

For the first time in ten years, KOIN finished in first position in the 11 p.m. news in the May 2008 NSI sweeps. KOIN News 6 at 11—unlike a year earlier when it lost over 20 percent of its CBS lead-in share—held its prime time share throughout its 11 p.m. newscast in the May 2008 NSI sweeps. In January 2008, KOIN's then-owners, New Vision Television, fired news director Jeff Alan and replaced him with Lynn Heider. Afterwards, KOIN dropped its slogan "Bringing News Home" as Jeff Alan had trademarked it under his name in 2000 before he worked at KOIN.

Under new news director Heider and long-time creative services director Rodger O'Connor, KOIN's 11 p.m. newscast increased its household ratings from May 2007 to May 2008 by 12 percent and its household share by 19 percent. It increased its household ratings by 30% from February 2008 to May 2008 and its household share by 33%. According to general manager Christopher Sehring, "The defining moment for KOIN News came in the third week of the sweeps. Up until then, we were having a strong ratings run against some terrific competition. Unfortunately, we then lost two straight nights – and I was worried that these losses might shake our new-found confidence. Fortunately, our team roared back on Thursday night, delivering an 8 household rating by increasing Without A Trace's 19 share lead-in to a 21 share. This type of comeback is indeed the sign of a station that refuses to toss in the towel – and will go a long way to helping us continue New Vision's plan to reenergize this great operation." This was the first time in a decade that KOIN's newscasts has won any timeslots.

On September 9, 2009, KOIN launched a new local program airing weekdays at 4 p.m., called Keep It Local. The show explored local neighborhoods and highlighted events taking place in Portland. The program was hosted by Priya David, with Mike Donahue and Araksya Karapetyan serving as its reporters. In 2010, Keep It Local was reformatted into Studio 6, a product and lifestyles magazine, hosted by Jenny Hansson, Anne Jeager, Hayley Platt and Jake Byron.

On July 26, 2010, KOIN became the third television station in the Portland market to begin broadcasting its local newscasts in high definition. It was also the first in the market to broadcast all aspects of its news programming, including field reporting, studio and weather segments completely in the format. KPTV was the only station remaining in the market that broadcast its local newscasts in 16:9 widescreen standard definition until it upgraded to HD on August 26, 2013.

=== Notable former on-air staff ===
- Carlos Amezcua – reporter
- Christine Chen – reporter
- Priya David – Keep It Local host (2009–2010)
- Jeff Gianola – news anchor
- Jenni Hogan – traffic reporter
- Tim Joyce – meteorologist
- Lars Larson – morning show host of The Buzz
- Rick Metsger – sports reporter
- Charles Royer – reporter
- Barry Serafin – reporter
- Anne State – weeknight anchor

== Technical information and subchannels ==
KOIN's transmitter is located in the Sylvan-Highlands neighborhood of Portland. The station's signal is multiplexed:

Subchannels of KOIN
| Subchannel | Res. | Short name | Programming |
|---|---|---|---|
| 6.1 | 1080i | KOIN-HD | CBS |
| 6.2 | 480i | GREAT | Great (4:3) |
| 6.3 | 480i | Rewind | Rewind TV |
| 32.2 | 480i | Antenna | Antenna TV (KRCW-TV) |
| 32.3 | 480i | Grit | Grit (KRCW-TV) |
| 32.4 | 480i | ShopLC | Shop LC (KRCW-TV) |

Broadcast on behalf of another station

On January 11, 2016, KOIN activated digital subchannel 6.2, which carried a standard definition version of KOIN and CBS programming for the next 20 days. At 12:05 a.m. PST on February 1, 2016, subchannel 6.2 began carrying GetTV programming.

On March 10, 2016, KOIN activated digital subchannel 6.3 and began carrying Decades programming until it was replaced with Bounce TV in September 2019. On September 1, 2021, KOIN's digital subchannel 6.3 replaced Bounce TV with SportsGrid, only for it to be replaced by Rewind TV on October 20, 2022.

=== Analog-to-digital conversion ===
KOIN ended regular programming over its analog signal, over VHF channel 6, on June 12, 2009, the official date on which full-power television stations in the United States transitioned from analog to digital broadcasts under federal mandate. The station's digital signal remained on its pre-transition UHF channel 40, using virtual channel 6.

As part of the SAFER Act, KOIN kept its analog signal (also heard at 87.7 FM like other channel 6 analog stations throughout the country) on the air from 7:28 a.m. on June 12 until June 27 to inform viewers of the digital television transition through a loop of public service announcements in English and Spanish from the National Association of Broadcasters. On June 27, 2009, at 7:06 a.m., KOIN broke from the nightlight PSA loop to air the station's 25th-anniversary special (originally broadcast in 1978) for the station's final 24 minutes of analog broadcasting; the analog signal permanently shut down at 7:30 that morning. As a result of the digital transition, those in the market lost access to KOIN's audio feed that was transmitted over the 87.7 FM frequency.

=== Translators ===
- K34DC-D Astoria
- K24MC-D Baker Valley
- K29IB-D Grays River, etc., WA
- K23OV-D Hood River
- K29EL-D La Grande
- K30OG-D La Grande
- K23OC-D Lincoln City–Newport
- K24KG-D Madras
- K24ME-D Milton-Freewater
- K32DE-D Pendleton
- K15KV-D Rockaway Beach
- K07YV-D The Dalles

Low-power translators in Cascadia, Florence, Heppner, Monument, Prineville, Rainier, Seaside, Sisters and Wallowa, Oregon, and Trout Lake, Washington, have been discontinued.
