= Paul Linnman =

American former television and radio personality

- Born: January 25, 1947 (age 79); Portland, Oregon, U.S.
- Occupations: Media consultant; former television journalist and presenter; talk radio host
- Notable credits: KATU-TV; KGW-TV; KEX (AM)

Paul Linnman (born January 25, 1947) is an American former television news reporter and anchor in Portland, Oregon, and radio personality in the same city. He is best known for his 1970 KATU report on the attempt by the Oregon Highway Division to dispose of a dead, beached whale by exploding it (beaches open to motor vehicles are considered state highways in Oregon). He worked for more than 30 years as a television news reporter, host and anchor, from 1967–1972 and 1978–2004. He had a talk radio show on KEX 1190 AM from 2003 to 2014, and subsequently has worked as a media consultant.

== Education ==
Born in 1947, Linnman grew up in Portland, Oregon, and attended Wilson High School. He graduated from Portland State University, studying journalism.

== Career ==
He began his broadcast career in 1967, when he was hired by Portland's ABC affiliate, KATU. His initial stint working at KATU lasted through 1972 and included various jobs, among them news assignment editor, sports director and investigative reporter. He left the station in January 1973, to join the staff of then-new City Commissioner Mildred Schwab, as an executive assistant. At the time, he had not intended to return to broadcast journalism, he told The Oregonian in a 1978 interview.

In January 1978, he was hired by KGW, Portland's NBC affiliate station, to replace departing co-host Dick Klinger on KGW's local magazine program Evening, which had been broadcast every weeknight since 1975. The Evening program was replaced in September 1979 by PM Magazine, a nationally syndicated program with a similar format and local hosts with each affiliate station; Linnman also served as one of its regular co-hosts while at KGW. Linnman turned down an invitation from Mike Wallace to work at a news station in Chicago.

Linnman left KGW in late 1983 to return to KATU, as host of a new daily one-hour afternoon local news and features program, Two at Four, scheduled to debut in January 1984. He remained with KATU for the next 20 years. In September 1987, Linnman returned to news broadcasting, when KATU made him the anchor of its 6:30 p.m. weekday newscast.

In 2003, Linnman began hosting a morning talk show on Portland radio station KEX. In August 2004, he left KATU in order to focus exclusively on his KEX radio show, which continued until 2014.

Since 2014, he has worked as a media consultant.

== Personal life ==
Paul Linnman married to Vicki Linnman, who is involved in philanthropic work supporting children's causes and formerly served as a parent–teacher association president. They have four sons.

== Published works ==
- Oregon Golf: The Oregon Coast, Southern Oregon, Portland & Environs, Central Oregon. Portland, Oregon: Graphic Arts Center Publishing Company, 1999. ISBN 1-55868-474-3
- The Exploding Whale: And Other Remarkable Stories from the Evening News (with Doug Brazil). Portland, Oregon: Graphic Arts Center Publishing Company, 2003. ISBN 1-55868-743-2
