= KRCW-TV =

Television station in Salem, Oregon

ATSC 3.0 station
- Salem–Portland, Oregon; Vancouver, Washington; United States
- City: Salem, Oregon
- Channels: Digital: 33 (UHF); Virtual: 32
- Branding: Portland's CW

Programming
- Affiliations: 32.1: The CW; for others, see § Technical information and subchannels

Ownership
- Owner: Nexstar Media Group; (Nexstar Media Inc.)
- Sister stations: KOIN; Tegna: KGW

History
- Founded: February 6, 1984
- First air date: May 8, 1989
- Former call signs: KUTF (1989–1992); KEBN (1992–1995); KWBP (1995–2006)
- Former channel number: Analog: 32 (UHF, 1989–2009)
- Former affiliations: Independent (1989–1990, 1990–1992, 1994–1995); Dark (1990, 1992–1994); The WB (1995–2006)
- Call sign meaning: Reflecting its CW affiliation

Technical information
- Licensing authority: FCC
- Facility ID: 10192
- ERP: 750 kW
- HAAT: 523.3 m (1,717 ft)
- Transmitter coordinates: 45°30′57.8″N 122°44′3.1″W

Links
- Public license information: Public file; LMS
- Website: www.koin.com/portlands-cw/

KRCW-TV (channel 32) is a television station licensed to Salem, Oregon, United States, serving as the Portland area's outlet for The CW. It is owned by Nexstar Media Group alongside CBS affiliate KOIN (channel 6); Nexstar's Tegna subsidiary owns NBC affiliate KGW (channel 8). KRCW-TV and KOIN share studios in the basement of the KOIN Tower skyscraper on Southwest Columbia Street in downtown Portland; KRCW-TV's transmitter is located in the Sylvan-Highlands neighborhood of the city.

Channel 32 began broadcasting as Christian station KUTF on May 8, 1989, from studios in Salem and a transmitter near Molalla. It was constructed by South Carolina–based Dove Broadcasting but never received adequate financial support from its viewers or coverage on local cable systems; it was off the air for six days in 1990, and Dove sold the station to Communications Programming Agency in 1991. The new owners relaunched the station as KEBN, a secular independent station known as "Oregon's New Eagle 32", in 1992. Amid moving the studio operation from Salem to Beaverton, the station went off the air in October 1992 and was later placed into receivership. Channel 32, Inc., purchased the station out of bankruptcy and returned it to the air in July 1994.

KEBN affiliated with The WB at its January 1995 launch and became known as KWBP later that year. The station was sold twice during The WB's existence, first to ACME Television in 1997 and then to Tribune Broadcasting in 2003. KWBP and 15 other Tribune stations became charter affiliates of The CW upon its creation in September 2006. In 2019, Nexstar acquired Tribune, bringing KOIN and KRCW under the same ownership. Immediately, KOIN debuted expanded local newscasts on KRCW. KRCW-TV is one of two ATSC 3.0 (NextGen TV) host stations for the Portland market; in turn, other stations broadcast its subchannels on its behalf.

== History ==
=== KUTF and KEBN: Construction ===
In 1983, the Federal Communications Commission (FCC) received applications from several firms wishing to activate channel 32, an available commercial TV channel at Salem, Oregon. First to apply was Willamette Valley Broadcasting Co., Ltd., of Chattanooga, Tennessee, which proposed to air a family-friendly format with possible network affiliation. Its application proposed to erect a tower in the Eola Hills northwest of Salem, which faced opposition from aviation officials over impacts to nearby McNary Field. Also filing was Salem Television Inc., a subsidiary of American Communications & Television of Gainesville, Florida, which dropped out before the end of the year.

Willamette Valley Broadcasting Co. was awarded the construction permit on May 22, 1984, and promised to have channel 32 built in about 18 months. By 1985, the station had a call sign of KUTF and had changed its proposed transmitter site to one in Clackamas County. Meanwhile, Willamette Valley Broadcasting was also attempting to firm up financing for the venture.

By 1986, the permit was held by Dove Broadcasting, owner of Christian television station WGGS-TV in Greenville, South Carolina, which began fundraising activities. At the time, Salem's existing commercial station, KECH-TV (channel 22), aired the daily Nite Line Christian program produced by WGGS. Dove had hoped for a mid-1987 start, but its plans were delayed two years for various reasons. The transmitter site was changed again to improve the coverage area, and the new location, 15 miles (24 km) from Molalla, was the subject of thefts; a 20-year-old transmitter purchased from a TV station in San Francisco was found to be defective and needed a total rebuild; and a four-wheel-drive vehicle was stolen.

After a transmitter test on May 6, KUTF launched on May 8, 1989. The station's original programming format consisted mostly of religious programs from FamilyNet as well as Nite Line, with the South Carolina program later replaced with a local version. Dove Broadcasting struggled to build a support base for KUTF. The station was not added to cable television systems, which Dove president Jimmy Thompson cited as a key reason viewership and donations were less than expected. In May 1990, the station left the air for six days. According to station insiders, the Jim Bakker and Jimmy Swaggart scandals gave potential supporters pause.

In June 1991, Dove Broadcasting filed to sell KUTF to Communications Programming Agency, Inc., a company controlled by Glen and Beverly Chambers and Ronna Scott, for $800,000. The new owners changed the program orientation of the station over the course of 1992. The ownership group took the name Eagle Broadcasting for its Oregon subsidiary and relaunched the station as KEBN, "Oregon's New Eagle 32", which was a more conventionally programmed independent station with fewer religious programs, adding home shopping, classic reruns and movies, and weekend sports. Among the sports telecasts was a package of Seattle Mariners baseball games that every Portland-market station had turned down. However, the rebrand did not solve its lack of cable carriage, which denied the station access to many potential viewers that were cable subscribers.

By October 1992, the station had operations split between Salem and Beaverton, a suburb of Portland, and sought to consolidate them in Beaverton. On October 12, to conserve funds during the moving process, KEBN left the air for what a station spokesman expected to be a two- to four-week period. At this time, the station was behind on its lease for the tower. By late 1993, a receiver had been appointed for the licensee, Willamette Valley Broadcasting, Ltd.

=== KWBP: Portland's WB ===
The receiver filed to sell KEBN to Channel 32, Inc., at the end of 1993. This company, formed to purchase the station, consisted of five major investors, including 49-percent owner and financier Roy Rose through his Peregrine Communications and Victor Ives, a veteran Portland radio and TV personality. While the deal was pending, KEBN returned to the air on a test basis in July 1994. Channel 32, Inc., also completed negotiations for KEBN to become Portland's affiliate of a forthcoming national network, The WB, and planned to change the call sign from KEBN to KPWB. The station went from testing to a more normal on-air schedule in September 1994. Under Ives, in addition to WB and syndicated programming, the station targeted specialized audiences with such features as live coverage of the murder trial of O. J. Simpson, a daily Japanese-language newscast, and a package of Spanish-language movies. In October 1995, it took the call letters KWBP, reflecting its new affiliation. Peregrine Communications bought Ives's stake in the station in 1995.

The WB as a network, due to parent company Time Warner's heavy involvement in cable systems, could not have conventional owned-and-operated stations. As a result, the network backed a separately owned group seeking to improve the network's national reach. This group materialized in January 1997 as ACME Television Holdings (in reference to Wile E. Coyote and the Road Runner cartoons), owned by WB network president Jamie Kellner; an 80-percent stake in KWBP was its first purchase, for a price of $25 million. To solve signal problems resulting from its tower site location, ACME acquired a low-power TV station in 2000 to serve as a translator for channel 32. By this time, it had added a college football package, including Portland State Vikings football, to its lineup.

=== Tribune ownership ===
In 2001, Tribune Broadcasting began eyeing the two largest ACME stations—KWBP and KPLR-TV in St. Louis, Missouri—after Kellner was promoted and reportedly had less interest in running a station group. In a deal announced in December 2002 and finalized in March 2003, ACME sold KWBP and KPLR-TV to Tribune for $275 million ($75 million of which was declared as the purchase price for KWBP). Tribune changed the station's brand from WB32 to Portland's WB and instituted a public affairs show. It also outsourced master control, traffic, and creative services functions for the station to KCPQ in Seattle, and in March 2005, KWBP was placed under the purview of KCPQ's general manager. A local general manager was later reinstated, but in 2008, responsibility for the station was again handed over to the KCPQ general manager.

On October 3, 2005, KWBP began airing a live 10 p.m. newscast, seven nights a week, produced by Portland NBC affiliate KGW. KGW had been producing a 10 p.m. newscast for Pax station KPXG-TV (channel 22), but the relationship had ended the month before.

In 2006, The WB and UPN merged to form The CW. KWBP was part of a group of Tribune stations immediately announced as one of the network's new affiliates. Ahead of the new network's launch, the station changed call signs from KWBP to KRCW-TV. In December 2011, KRCW began airing Eye Opener, a syndicated morning newscast produced by Tribune; it featured national news and feature stories along with local inserts. Eye Opener was canceled in 2017 and replaced with a similarly syndicated newscast, Morning Dose, which lasted a year before being discontinued.

Tribune Media attempted to sell itself to Sinclair Broadcast Group—owner of ABC affiliate KATU (channel 2) and Univision affiliate KUNP (channel 16)—in 2017. Sinclair would have been required to sell one of KRCW-TV or KUNP if the deal were to be approved. However, in 2018, the FCC designated the deal for hearing by an administrative law judge; the deal was then terminated by Tribune.

=== Duopoly with KOIN ===
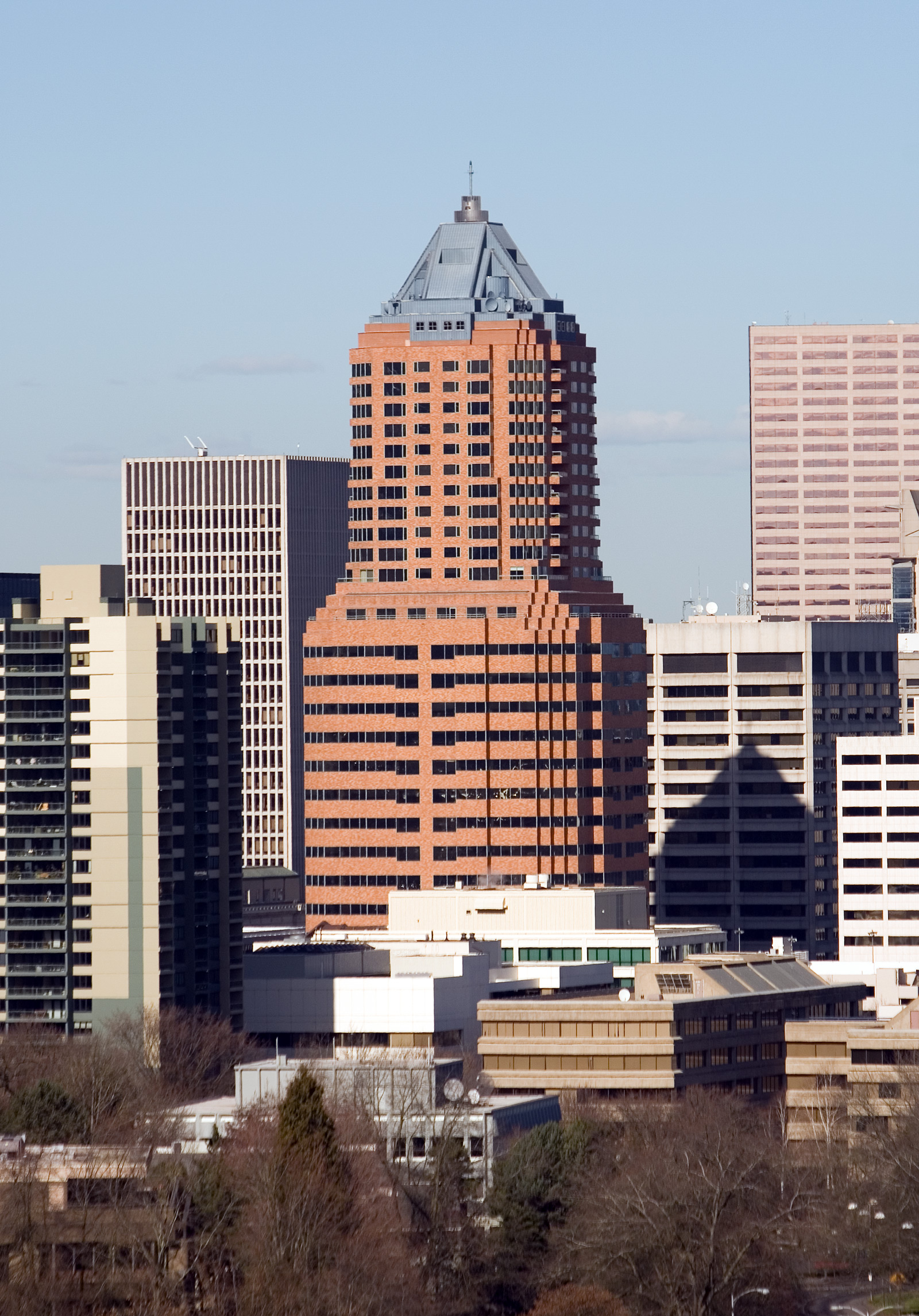
KOIN Tower

After the Sinclair purchase fell apart, Nexstar Media Group acquired Tribune in 2019 for $6.9 billion in cash and debt on December 3, 2018.

Nexstar owned KOIN, Portland's CBS affiliate, and moved to integrate KRCW with KOIN; in early 2020, the station's main studio was changed from its Beaverton site to KOIN Tower. With the ownership change, beginning September 19, 2019, KOIN began producing the station's 10 p.m. newscast, replacing KGW after nearly 14 years. The next month, Nexstar lengthened the newscast from 30 minutes to a full hour and created a new weekly sports highlight show, Game On!. By 2022, a morning news extension from 7 to 9 a.m. had been added to the KRCW schedule.

On August 19, 2025, Nexstar Media Group agreed to acquire Tegna for $6.2 billion. In Portland, Tegna already owns KGW. The transaction was completed on March 19, 2026, after the FCC's Media Bureau allowed Nexstar to hold more than two full-power TV station licenses in markets such as Portland. A temporary restraining order issued one week later by the U.S. District Court for the Eastern District of California, later escalated to a preliminary injunction, has prevented KGW from being integrated into KOIN and KRCW.

== Sports programming ==
As of 2024, KRCW holds the local broadcasting rights to 20 events from the University of Portland, college football from both Pacific University and the Northwest Conference, and college baseball from Oregon State University. The Portland Pickles, a collegiate summer baseball team, announced a broadcasting partnership with KRCW in 2025 to air six home games on the station and stream them on KOIN+.

== Technical information and subchannels ==
KRCW-TV's transmitter is located in the Sylvan-Highlands neighborhood of Portland. It is one of two stations in the market broadcasting an ATSC 3.0 (NextGen TV) signal, along with KPDX. Both stations began ATSC 3.0 service in July 2020. As KWBP, the station first began providing a digital signal on August 30, 2003, on channel 33 from a more centrally located transmitter; this channel was used after the digital television transition on June 12, 2009.

Subchannels provided by KRCW (ATSC 1.0)
Subchannel	Res.	Short name	Programming	ATSC 1.0 host
32.1	1080i	KRCW	The CW	KATU
32.2	480i	Antenna	Antenna TV	KOIN
32.3	480i	Grit	Grit	KOIN
32.4	480i	ShopLC	Shop LC	KOIN

=== ATSC 3.0 lighthouse ===
Subchannels of KRCW-TV (ATSC 3.0)
Subchannel	Short name	Programming
2.1	KATU	ABC (KATU)
2.10	T2	T2
2.11	PBTV	Pickleballtv
6.1	KOIN	CBS (KOIN)
32.1	KRCW	The CW

Subchannel streamed via the internet
Subchannel broadcast with digital rights management

=== Translators ===
KRCW-TV and its subchannels, which are broadcast by KATU and KOIN as part of the ATSC 3.0 hosting arrangement, are rebroadcast into areas of Oregon and southwest Washington by those stations' translators.
