= Kelley Baker =

American film director

- Born: July 20, 1956 (age 69); Portland, Oregon, US
- Occupation: Film director
- Website: www.angryfilmmaker.com

Kelley J. Baker (born July 20, 1956) is an American independent filmmaker, writer, and director. His three indie feature films are Birddog (1999), The Gas Cafe (2001), and Kicking Bird (2005).

== Education ==
Baker attended the University of Southern California. He received a BA (1980) and an MFA (1982) in Film Production from the USC School of Cinematic Arts and did post-graduate work at the American Film Institute (1989).

== Career ==
Baker was the recipient of the Western States Media Arts Fellowship (1997) as well as grants from the SOROS Fund (2000), the Collins Foundation (2000), the Oregon Arts Commission (1993), Pioneer Fund Emerging Documentary Filmmaker grant for his film Criminal Justice (1985), Rose E. Tucker Charitable Trust (1984), the Maurie Clark Foundation (1984), and a technical assistance grant from RACC (2004). Baker has completed two documentaries for the National Endowment for the Arts and the Juvenile Justice Office of the Department of Justice (1999).

=== Projects with other filmmakers ===
He worked with Roger Corman as Assistant ADR (Automated Dialogue Replacement) Mixer on Humanoids from the Deep in 1996.

== Books ==
Baker is the author of:

- The Angry Filmmaker Survival Guide: Making the Extreme No-Budget Film (2008)
- From Arrah Wanna To Mule Shoe
- Dennis Barton is a Bastard
- Road Dog.
- Behind the Screens: Programmers Reveal How...

== Interviews ==
In 2021, Kelley appeared on the fifteenth episode of The Ghost of Hollywood, where he revisited his work with Gus Van Sant, Todd Haynes, and Will Vinton.

== Filmography ==
=== Feature films ===
Year	Title	Director	Producer	Writer
1999	Birddog	Yes	No	Yes
2003	The Gas Cafe	Yes	Yes	Yes
2005	Kicking Bird	Yes	Yes	Yes
