= Sylvan-Highlands, Portland, Oregon =

Sylvan-Highlands
- Neighborhood
- Location in Portland
- Coordinates: 45.515°N 122.730°W
- Country: United States
- State: Oregon
- City: Portland
- Website: sylvanhighlands.org

Sylvan-Highlands is a neighborhood of Portland, Oregon, United States located on the west side of the West Hills.

== History ==
In 1850, Nathan B. Jones, a pioneer of 1847, settled at the head of Tanner Creek and platted lots for a community he called "Zion Town". It is unknown if he named the place for Mount Zion, a summit located about a mile to the southeast. Because the name "Zion" for a local post office would have caused confusion, as there had already been two post offices so-named in Oregon, a resident suggested the name "Sylvan", from the Roman deity of the woods Silvanus. The office was established in 1890 and it closed in 1906. Nathan B. Jones, who was considered an eccentric hermit, had wanted Zion Town to become the new capital of Oregon. He was murdered during a robbery in 1894. Sylvan post office was located at what today is the interchange of Sunset Highway, Scholls Ferry Road and Skyline Boulevard within the Portland city limits in Multnomah County.

== Schools ==
Schools that serve the neighborhood include Ainsworth Elementary School, Bridlemile Elementary School, West Sylvan Middle School, and Lincoln High School.

== Parks and visitor attractions ==
The Oregon Zoo and Washington Park are located in the neighborhood. The former Portland Children's Museum, which closed in 2021, was also in the neighborhood.

== Neighborhood organizations ==
The Sylvan-Highlands Neighborhood Association meets on the second Tuesday of every other month. The association is a part of the District 4 coalition.
