= Journal Building =

Journal Building may refer to:

- Journal Building (Augusta, Maine), listed on the National Register of Historic Places (NRHP) in Kennebec County, Maine
- Journal Building (Portland, Oregon), NRHP-listed
