= Lauretta Jean's =

Bakery in Portland, Oregon, U.S.

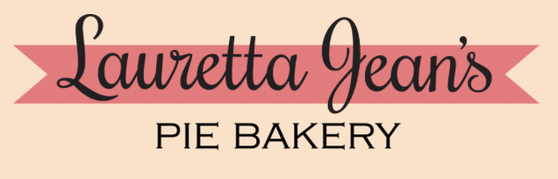

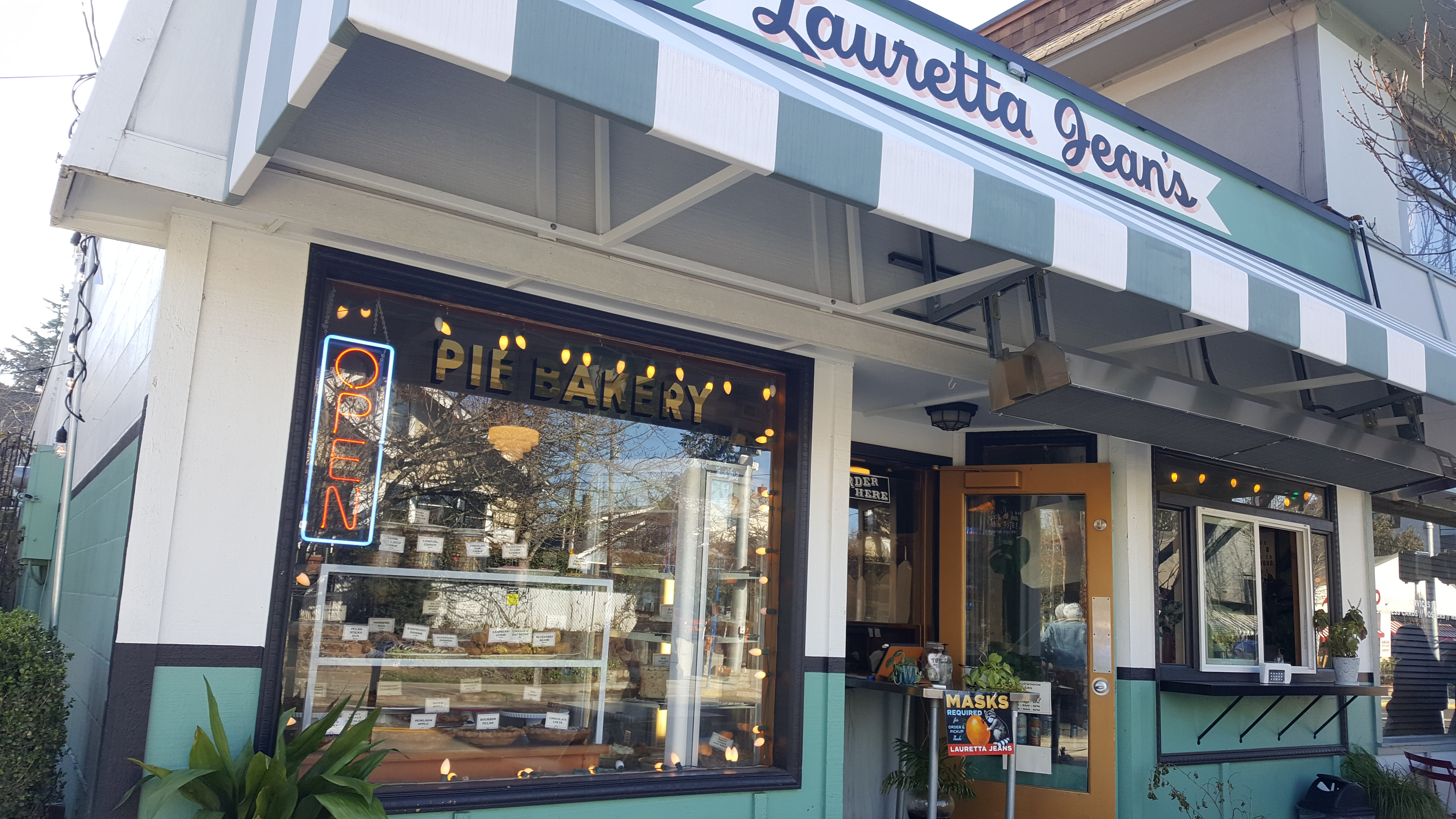
- Exterior of the shop in Southeast Portland, Oregon, 2022
- Interactive map of Lauretta Jean's

Restaurant information
- Owner: Kate McMillen
- Location: 3402 Southeast Division Street, Portland, Multnomah, Oregon, 97202, United States
- Coordinates: 45.5046°N 122.6293°W
- Website: laurettajeans.com

Lauretta Jean's is a bakery and pie shop in Portland, Oregon, United States. Baker and owner Kate McMillen started the business as a stall at the Portland Farmers Market before opening a brick and mortar shop in downtown Portland in 2011. The business has operated in southeast Portland's Richmond neighborhood since 2012.

Lauretta Jean's has garnered a positive reception. It was included in Thrillist's 2021 list of the nation's 25 best pie shops. Lauretta Jean's was selected to represent Oregon in The Daily Meal's 2024 overview of the best chicken pot pies in each U.S. state. It was also selected for Oregon in Tasting Table's 2026 list of the best pies in each state.

== Description ==
Lauretta Jean's is a bakery in southeast Portland; previously, the business operated a shop in downtown Portland. Martin Cizmar of Willamette Week described the southeast Portland location as "classy but casual" with "low light, a simple wood-and-glass counter and a poster advocating weed". The newspaper's Neil Ferguson said the southeast Portland shop is a "quaint and warming space", with robin egg blue walls.

=== Menu ===
The menu has included pies, brownies, Nanaimo bars, breakfast pastries such as apricot almond scones and biscuits with jam and butter, cookies, yogurt, and breakfast sandwiches. The lunch menu has included quiches, salads, soups, and pies with ham and cheese, caramelized onion, and blue cheese. Ingredients for biscuit sandwiches include apple barbecue sauce, Brussels sprouts, egg, and pulled pork. Quiches use eggs, chorizo, and red pepper.

Pies are sold whole or by the slice; varieties have included banana cream, pumpkin, coconut cream, chocolate cream, heirloom apple and bourbon-pecan, honey hazelnut, marionberry, salty grapefruit, blackberry and raspberry streusel, key lime, and sweet potato marshmallow meringue. Coffee drinks and alcoholic beverages are also served.

== History ==
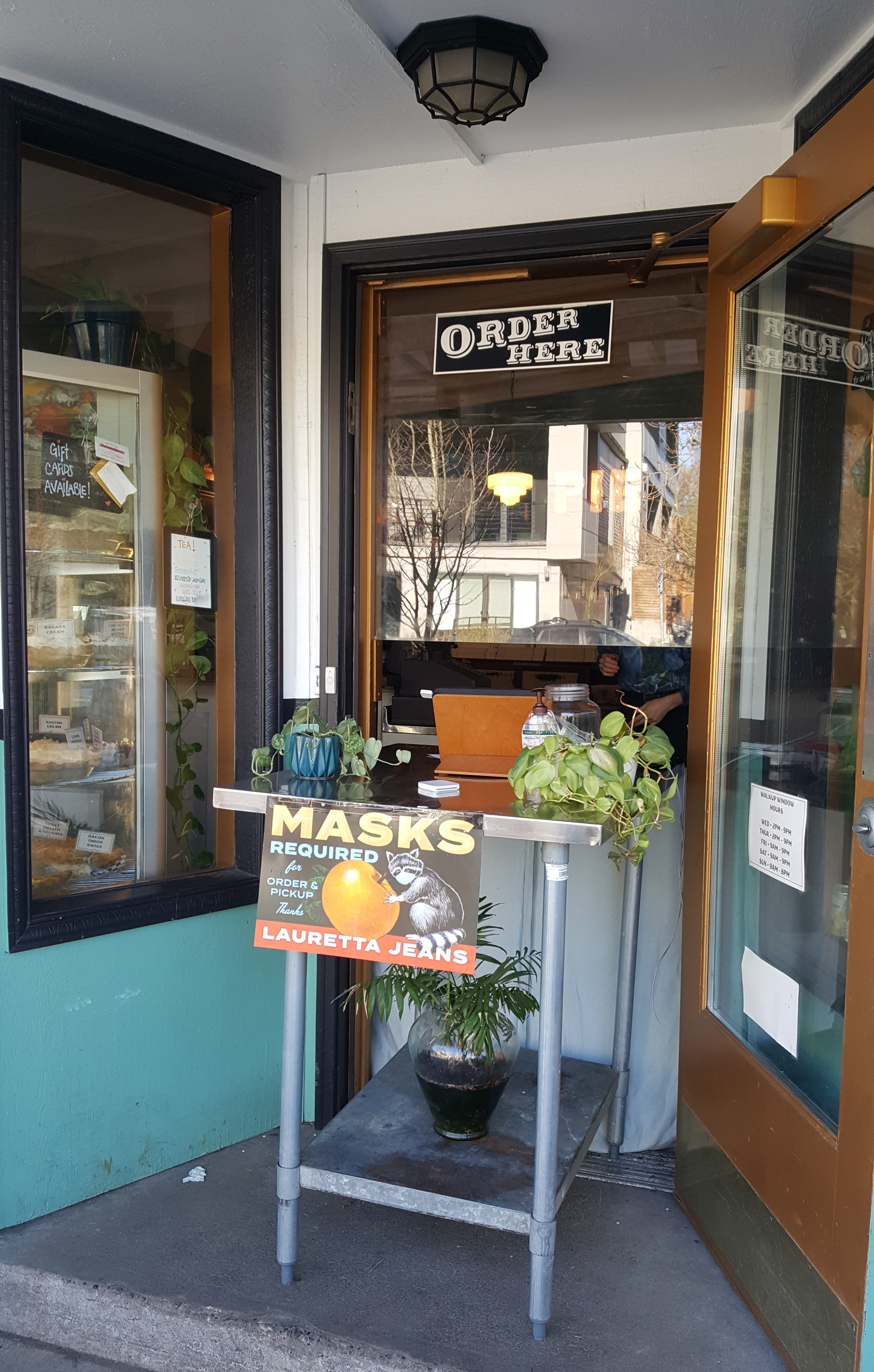
Window operation in 2022, during the COVID-19 pandemic

Baker and owner Kate McMillen began operating the business from a stall at the Portland Farmers Market. The business is named after her grandmother Lauretta Jean. In 2011, McMillen relocated Lauretta Jean's to a small brick and mortar shop on Southwest Pine Street in downtown's Transit Mall, operating primarily via take-out and sharing the space with Cafe Velo, which would later close in August 2011.

McMillen opened a second shop on Division Street in southeast Portland's Richmond neighborhood in 2012, filling the space previously occupied by Pix Pâtisserie. The second shop offered an expanded menu and indoor seating for patrons. She created separate pickup and take-out windows for the shop during the COVID-19 pandemic.

Lauretta Jean's has hosted activities and specials for Pi Day. In 2013, the bakery's holiday celebration had live music and "pie-and-booze pairings". Ahead of the holiday in 2014, the bakery held a "March-Madness-style" pie bracket as well as food and drink specials. A salty grapefruit pie debuted in 2022. In 2023, Lauretta Jean's had special flavors, extended hours, and "mystery boxes" with slices of three surprise varieties. These "mystery boxes" returned in 2024. In 2025, the bakery offered specials through the weekend for the first time. In 2026, Lauretta Jean's offered eight special flavors and made approximately 1,000 pies over the holiday weekend, twice that of a typical weekend. Since c. 2019, a 3.14-mile run is held in Ladd's Addition on Pi Day, often ending at the bakery.

Lauretta Jean's was a vendor at Feast Portland in 2018 and 2019. Will Ferrell visited the shop in 2023.

== Reception ==
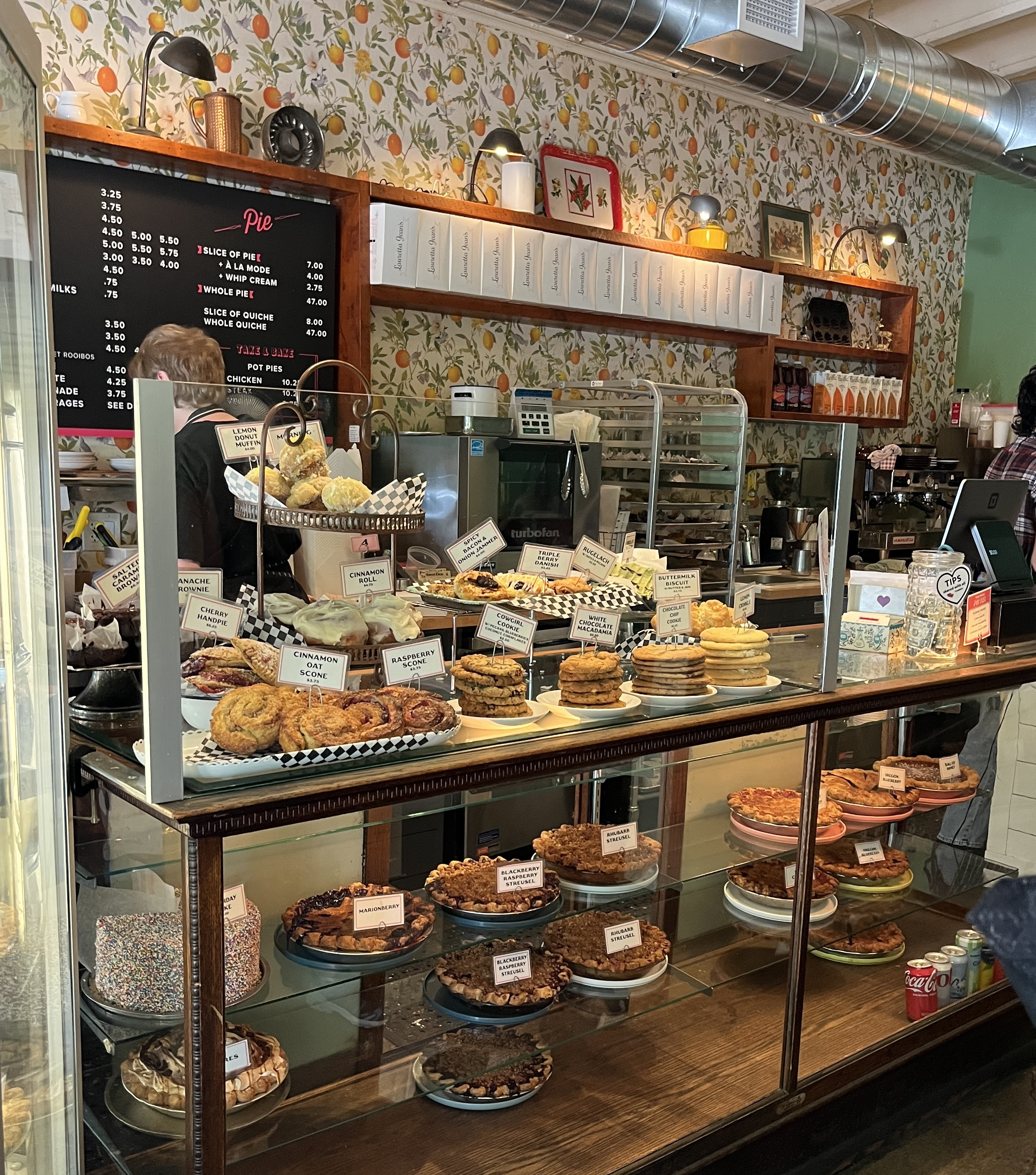
The bakery's interior, 2026

Fodor's has described Lauretta Jean's as a "foodie icon" of Portland. Portland Monthly included the business in a 2012 overview of the city's best biscuits. The magazine's Karen Brooks and other writers called the pies "unstoppable" in 2012. Portland Monthly included the biscuit board in a 2017 list of 30 local dishes "that will break your mind—but not your budget". Katherine Chew Hamilton ranked Lauretta Jean's first in the magazine's 2022 overview of Portland's seven best pie shops. Alex Frane included the shop in Portland Monthly's 2025 list of the city's best pies, writing, "There's no denying that this tiny shop on SE Division Street makes the best pie in Portland, as indicated by the daily lines out the door". In 2013, The Oregonian said Lauretta Jean's "offers one of the best weekend-only brunches in a brunch-heavy neighborhood", calling the "excellent" scones and the seasonal vegetables the "stars" of the menu. In 2016, the newspaper's readers ranked Lauretta Jean's one of Portland's ten best pie shops. Samantha Bakall of The Oregonian included the bakery in 2017 list of the city's best dessert spots for Valentine's Day. The newspaper's readers also recommended the shop as a brunch destination in 2019.

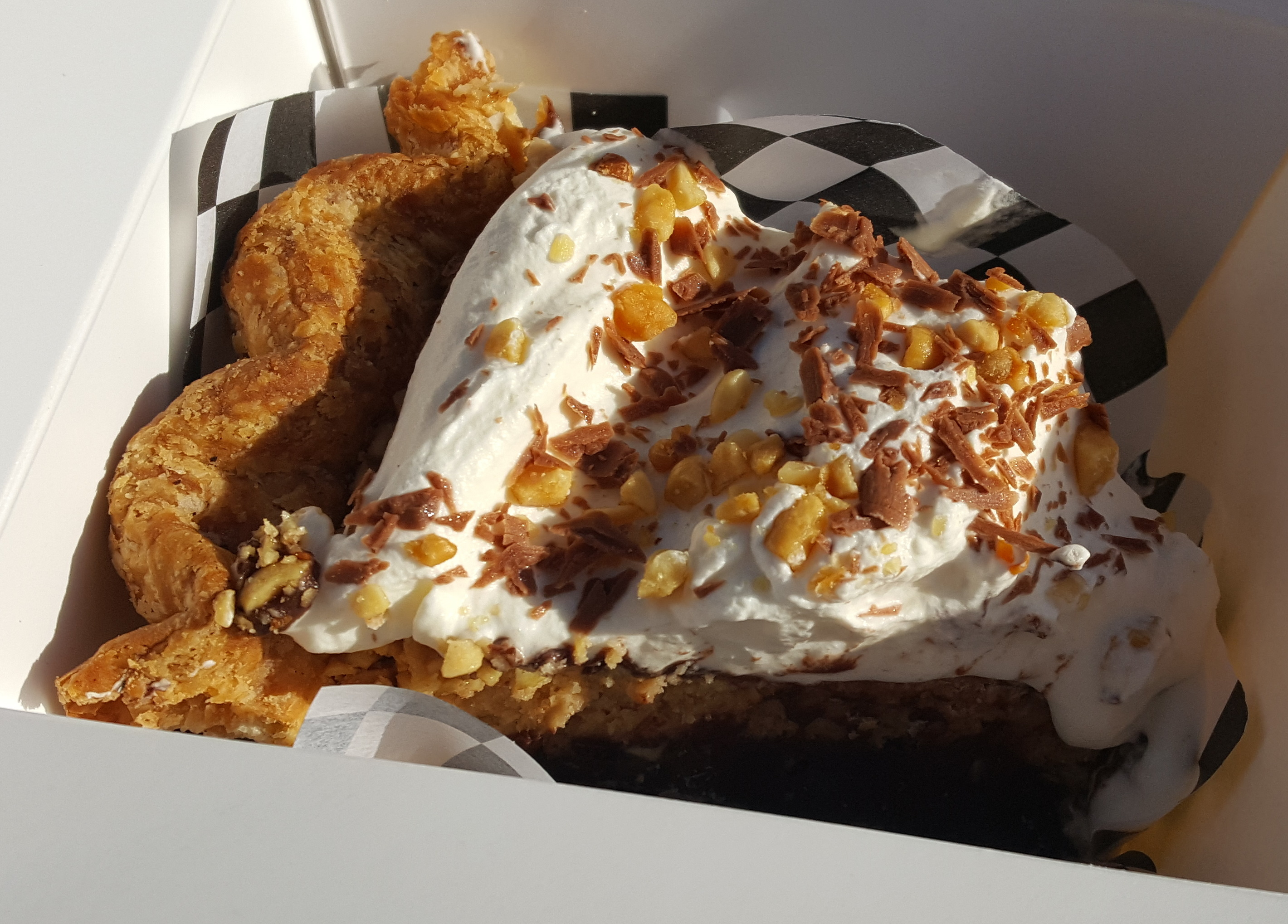
Piece of chocolate pie in a take-out container, 2022

In 2013, Martin Cizmar of Willamette Week called Lauretta Jean's "a perfect pie shop". The business ranked first in the Best Pie category in the newspaper's annual "Best of Portland" readers' poll in 2016. It ranked third in the Best Dessert House category and first in the Best Pie category in 2017, and won the Best Pie Shop category in 2020. Andrea Damewood of Willamette Week said Lauretta Jean's was Portland's best pie shop in 2023. Jagger Blaec of the Portland Mercury said "every option on Lauretta's menu is as unique as the next" in 2017. Michelle Lopez included Lauretta Jean's in Eater Portland's 2018 list of fifteen "Portland biscuits that would make any Southerner proud", and Nick Townsend included the bakery in the website's 2020 list of fifteen restaurants "worth visiting" on Southeast Division Street. The website's 2021 overview of "legit" pies in Portland said Lauretta Jean's is "easily one of the city's top three pie shops" and complimented McMillen, who "particularly shines with her cream pies, as well as the standout salted honey pie".

Thrillist included Lauretta Jean's in a 2021 list of the 25 best pie shops in the United States. Oscar Ponteri included the shop in The Franklin Post's 2022 overview of Portland's best pies. Jenn Carnevale selected Lauretta Jean's to represent Oregon in The Daily Meal's 2024 overview of the best chicken pot pies in each U.S. state. Writing for The New York Times, Jamie Cattanach said the salted honey pie "will make you understand why there's a line". Emily Hunt selected Lauretta Jean's to represent Oregon in Tasting Table's 2026 overview of the best pies in each U.S. state.

== See also ==
- List of bakeries
