= John Francis Carroll =

John F. Carroll
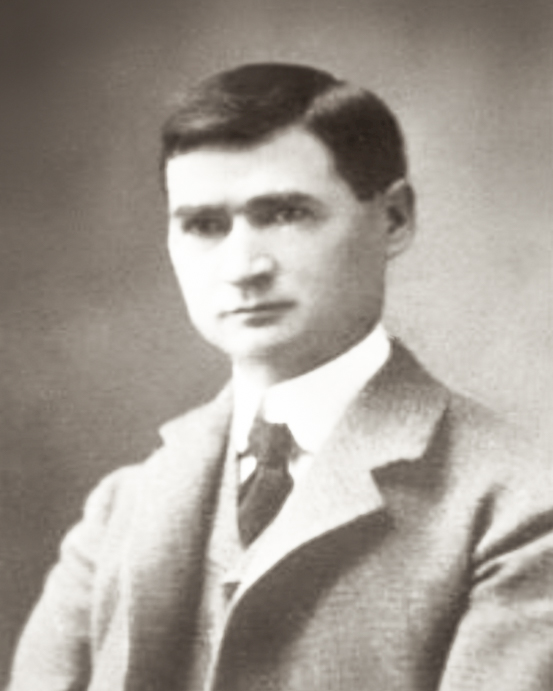
- A young John Carroll
- Born: June 15, 1858; St. Clair, Pennsylvania
- Died: December 4, 1917 (aged 59); Portland, Oregon
- Occupations: Newspaper publisher and editor
- Years active: 1876 – 1882, 1884 – 1917
- Known for: Evening Telegram

John Francis Carroll (June 15, 1858 – December 4, 1917) was a newspaper publisher and editor who operated the Evening Telegram in Portland, Oregon. He was best known as an early champion of both the Portland Rose Festival and what became the Carroll Public Market.

== Early life and education ==
Carroll was born in 1858 in St. Clair, Pennsylvania, a mining town near extensive coal deposits. His parents, Thaddeus Carroll and Caroline Jordan, had immigrated to Pennsylvania from Ireland. Carroll and his brother were raised by an aunt after the death of their mother. Carroll attended Pennsylvania Normal School in Millersville, and his first job was as a Breaker boy in a coal mine. Later he briefly studied medicine at Western Reserve University.

== Career ==
Carroll's first job as a newspaper reporter was at the Evening Chronicle in Pottsville, Pennsylvania, where he covered the Molly Maguires trials and witnessed the hanging of 17 defendants. In 1879 he joined the staff of the Missouri Republican in St. Louis, but in 1880 he became city editor for the Omaha Bee. In 1881 he returned to Missouri and took a job at the St. Joseph Gazette, where he befriended writer Eugene Field. Carroll moved to Texas in 1882.

In 1884 Carroll worked at the Cleveland Leader, then in 1887 he became editor and part owner of the Leader in Cheyenne, Wyoming. He became embroiled in the Wyoming range war, and after eight years in Wyoming he moved to Colorado to become managing editor at The Denver Post. He served as general manager of the Denver Times for six years. Then in 1903, Carroll moved to Portland and became editor of The Oregon Journal. After three years at the Journal, he became editor and publisher of the Evening Telegram, a job he would keep until his death in 1917. In 1914, Carroll became co-owner of the paper, after he and partners John E. Wheeler and L. R. Wheeler purchased it from The Oregonian Publishing Company, who had been his employer as the paper's editor until that time. He continued working as The Telegram's editor.

== Personal life ==
Carroll was a Democrat and was a Mason of the 32nd degree. In 1889 he married Florence Hurlbut in Denver, and the couple produced eight children. While in Denver, Carroll helped publish the work of poet Paul Laurence Dunbar.
