= James Beard Public Market =

Proposed public market in Portland, Oregon, U.S.

- The market under construction in 2026
- Interactive map of James Beard Public Market
- Address: Portland, Oregon; United States
- Coordinates: 45°31′11″N 122°40′44″W

Website
- www.jamesbeardpublicmarket.com

The James Beard Public Market is a public market under construction in Portland, Oregon, United States. Named after James Beard, a Portland-born chef and cookbook writer, the market is slated to open in two adjoining buildings Selling Building and the Ungar Building in downtown with anticipated opening sometime in 2027.

It was originally planned near the west end of Morrison Bridge, however this plan was abandoned in 2016 due to pedestrian accessibility.

== History ==
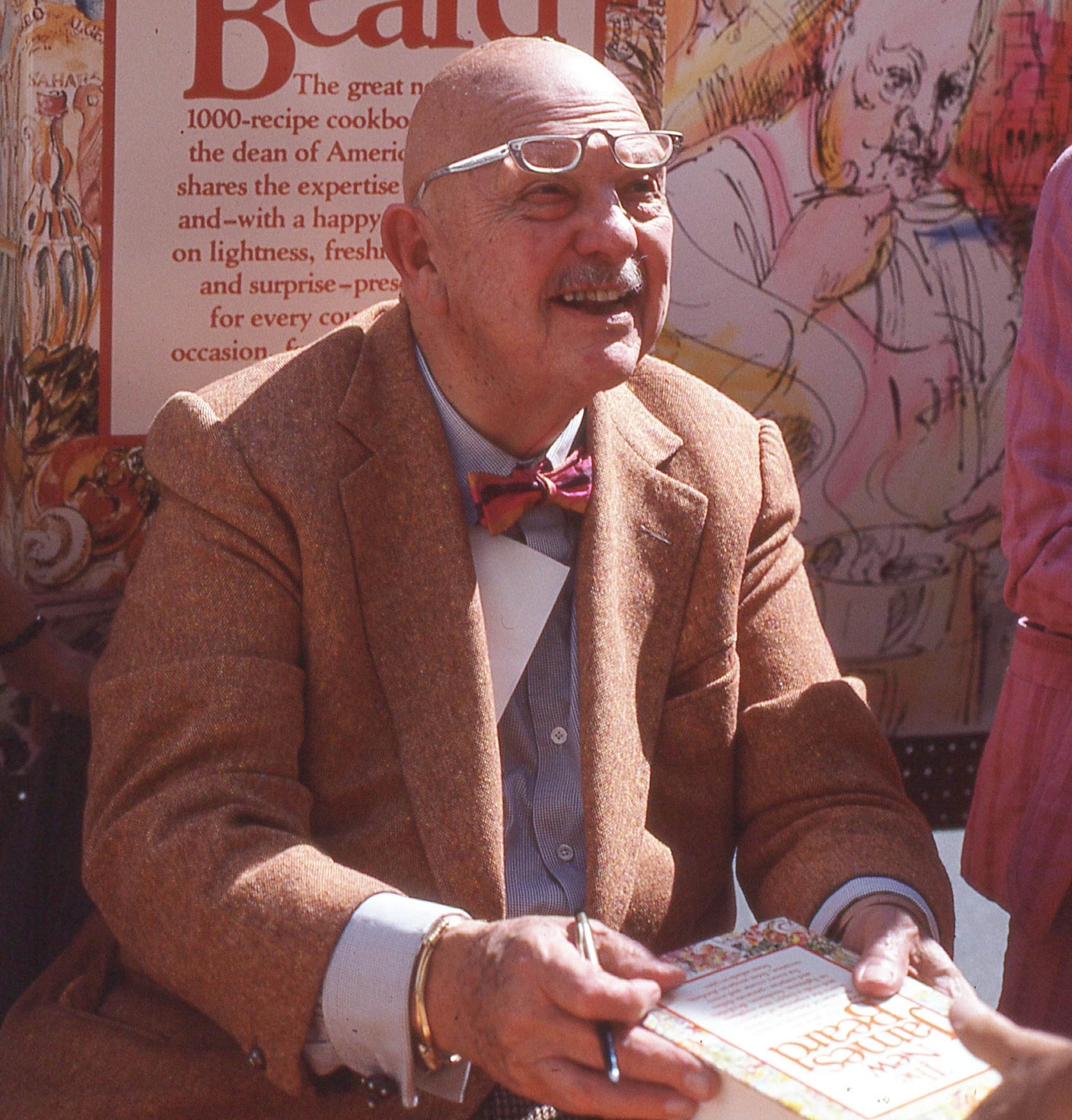
The market's namesake, James Beard, in 1981

Part of the originally proposed site of the market abuts The Oregonian Printing Press Park, where the first copy of The Oregonian was printed in December 1850.

The original site for the James Beard Public Market (JBPM) is located near the former site of the Portland Public Market, which was the largest public market in the U.S. when it was built in December 1933 for $1 million. It was located on what is now Tom McCall Waterfront Park in between the Hawthorne Bridge and Morrison Bridge. Its construction enabled removal of the on-street Carroll Public Market. After closing in 1942 due to lack of demand, it was later used as the headquarters of The Oregon Journal from 1948 to 1961. Demolition occurred in 1969.

Multnomah County sold 3.12 acres (1.26 ha) of property to Melvin Mark Companies and the James Beard Public Market Foundation (JBPMF) in June 2012 for $10.43 million.

=== Design ===
==== Early designs ====
The market was expected to cost $30 million to construct, with the funds coming from public donations and Multnomah County. According to the market's director, it would have included solar panels and green roofing, be divided into 12-by-12-foot (3.7 m × 3.7 m) stalls, and have a mezzanine level for education and cooking classes.

Portland city officials considered removing or modifying the cloverleaf ramps that run from the Morrison Bridge to Naito Parkway, while the market proposed moving the ramps to Morrison and Stark streets, allowing easier pedestrian access from the waterfront. However, the market and the city failed to reach a decision on the ramps, leading the market to abandon the waterfront site in November 2016. Other sites near the Oregon Museum of Science and Industry (OMSI) and in the South Waterfront were also considered at the time.

The initial design for the market was unveiled on June 25, 2015 at OMSI. Facing Naito Parkway and the Willamette River, there would have been 650 feet (200 m) of storefronts, with a facade of glass doors to allow outdoor seating during good weather. A terraced rooftop garden with views of Mount Hood was also planned.

The market was previously planned to be located at the west end of the Morrison Bridge in downtown Portland, in what are currently parking lots, but this site was dropped in November 2016 after concerns over pedestrian accessibility due to the bridgehead ramps. The developer continued with plans to build a 17-story building at the same site. Original designs for the market called for it to have two halls, totaling 80,000 square feet (7,400 m^{2}), along with 60 permanent and 30 to 40 temporary stalls for food vendors. These plans were abandoned in 2016.

==== Ongoing work ====
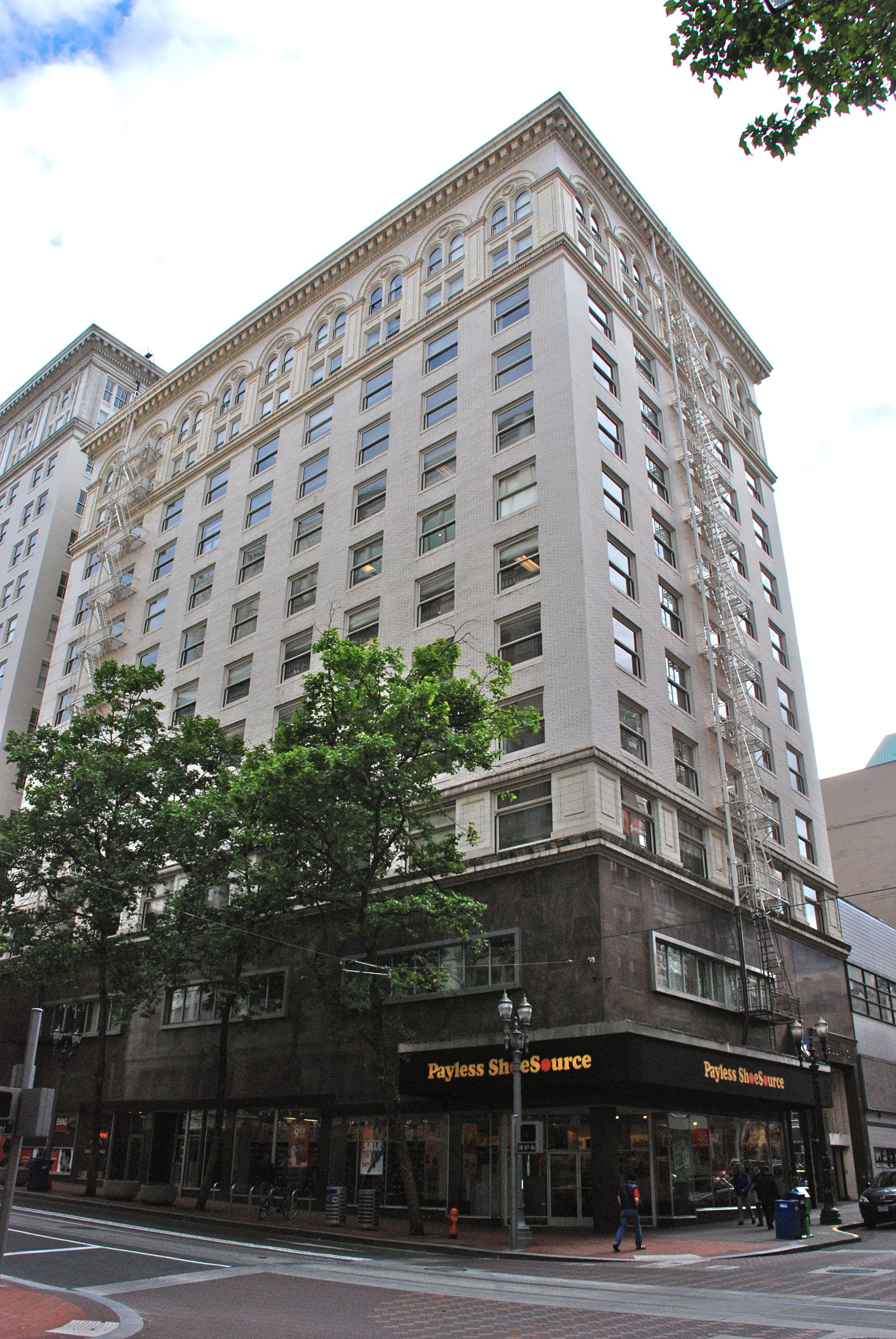
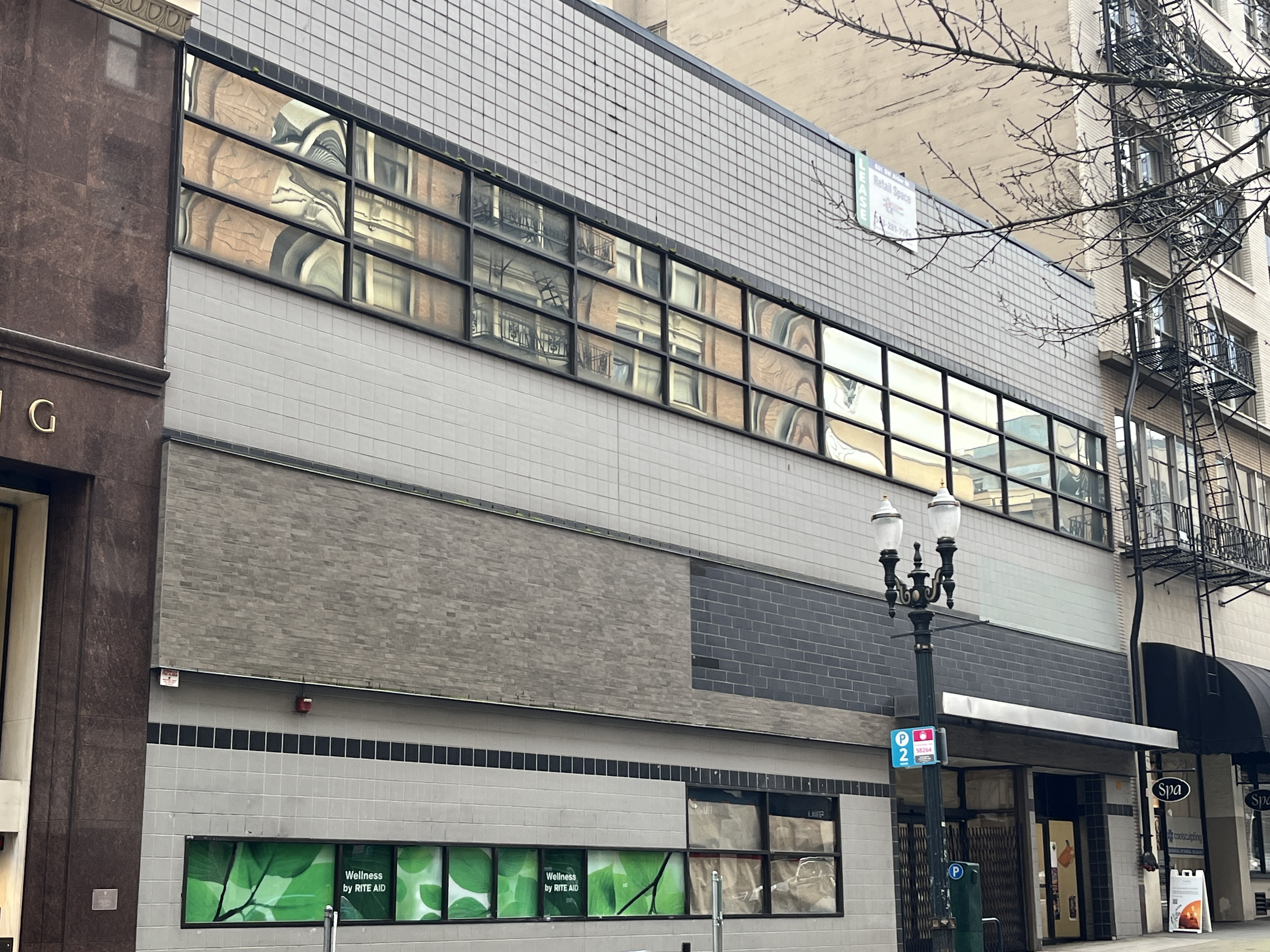
The Selling Building (top, exterior pictured in 2012) and the Ungar Building (bottom, exterior pictured in 2025)

The market plans on opening sometime in 2027. It will be housed in the Selling Building and the Ungar Building. In March 2025, the JBPMF submitted design requests for both buildings. Both buildings require a design review. Since moving location to the historic Selling and Ungar Buildings, San Francisco based BCV Architecture + Interiors has taken over the design.

The market is slated to have an event space, a teaching kitchen, and a cookbook store.

=== Funding ===
The Oregon Legislative Assembly allocated $10 million from lottery bonds towards the construction of the market, which is estimated to cost $25 million. In May 2025, Portland City Council pledged $1 million to help fund the market. In June 2025, Regence BlueCross BlueShield of Oregon and Cambia Health Foundation pledged $500,000.

=== Operations ===
The Nutrition for All program will offer free cooking and nutrition classes. The classes, which are supported by Regence BlueCross BlueShield of Oregon and the Cambia Health Foundation, will start at the National University of Natural Medicine in partnership with the university, before moving into the market.

==== Vendors ====
The market is slated to accommodate approximately 40 vendors. Approximately 100 vendor applications were submitted. Vendors will accept Supplemental Nutrition Assistance Program (SNAP) benefits.

Spella Caffè is slated to operate at the market. There are also plans for a butcher, a cheese shop, fish market, restaurants, and a wine shop.

== See also ==
- Pine Street Market, another food hall in Portland
