= Philip Augustus Marquam =

American politician (1823–1912)

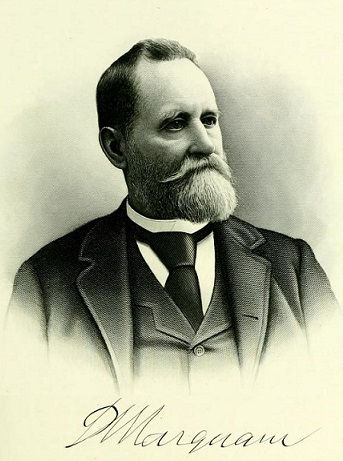
- Philip A Marquam Sr (1823-1912)
- Born: February 28, 1823; Maryland
- Died: May 8, 1912 (aged 89); Portland, Oregon
- Occupation(s): Judge, businessman, lawyer
- Spouse: Emma Kern (married 1853-1902)

Philip A. Marquam (February 28, 1823 – May 8, 1912) was a lawyer, judge, legislator, and real estate developer in the U.S. state of Oregon.

== Early life ==
Philip Marquam was born in Baltimore, Maryland, on February 28, 1823, to Philip Winchester Marquam and Charlotte Mercer Poole. The family later moved to Indiana. There Philip attended law school in Bloomington, Indiana. He went to California as a "49er" during the gold rush of 1849, and was elected judge in Yolo County.

== Oregon ==
In August 1851, Marquam moved to Portland, Oregon, then a small town of under 1,000 inhabitants. For many years he was the largest landowner in Multnomah County, Oregon, counting among his holdings Portland's Fulton District and his homestead on Marquam Hill in southwest Portland. The hill was part of a 300-acre (1.2 km^{2}) donation land claim he purchased for $2,500 in 1857 from John Donner, brother of George Donner of the ill-fated Donner Party. The hill is now the site of the Oregon Health & Science University and the Portland Veterans Affairs Medical Center.

In 1862, he was elected Multnomah County judge. He served eight years in the position, having been re-elected to a second four-year term in 1866.

In 1882, Marquam was elected as a Republican to the Oregon House of Representatives from Multnomah County. Marquam gained a reputation as a transportation advocate and developer. He was instrumental in the formation of the Oregon Railway and Navigation Company in 1887.

He built the Marquam Grand Opera House in Portland, later renamed the Orpheum Theater. The theater was torn down in the 1922. It was located in the downtown Portland block bounded by Broadway, Alder, 6th and Morrison streets, which block was owned by Marquam. In the south half of the same block he built an eight-story office building, the Marquam Building, completed around 1892, next to his home, a small house at the southeast corner of the block. The office building and house were later torn down and replaced by the Northwestern National Bank Building.

Less than two years after arriving in Oregon, Marquam married Emma Kern, on May 8, 1853. Eleven children were born to the couple, four sons and seven daughters. The youngest child, Thomas Alfred "Tom" Marquam, served as mayor of Fairbanks, Alaska from 1923 to 1925. Emma Marquam died in 1902.

Marquam died at the home of one of his daughters, in southwest Portland, shortly after midnight on May 8, 1912, four days after suffering a stroke. He is buried in River View Cemetery in Portland.

Bearing his name is the Marquam Bridge in Portland, opened in 1966, Marquam Hill and the adjacent Marquam Gulch and Marquam Nature Park. The community of Marquam, Oregon, is named for his older brother, Alfred.
