= Ernest Boyd MacNaughton =

American architect

- Born: October 22, 1880; Cambridge, Massachusetts, US
- Died: August 24, 1960 (aged 79); Portland, Oregon, US
- Resting place: River View Cemetery (Portland, Oregon); 45.465535°N 122.673272°W
- Other names: E.B. MacNaughton; Mr. Mac
- Education: Bachelor of Science degree
- Alma mater: Massachusetts Institute of Technology
- Occupations: President of The Oregonian publishing company President of First National Bank of Oregon; President of Reed College
- Years active: 1906 – 1960
- Board member of: Japan-America Society of Oregon; American Civil Liberties Union Advisory Council; Oregon Historical Society
- Spouses: Gertrude Hutchinson; Cheryl Scholz
- Children: 3

Ernest Boyd MacNaughton (October 22, 1880 – August 24, 1960) was president of the First National Bank of Oregon (1932 – 1947), then chairman (1947 – 1960), president of The Oregonian publishing company (1947 – 1950), and president of Reed College (1948 – 1952). He is the namesake of the ACLU E.B. MacNaughton Civil Liberties Award.

== Early life and education ==
MacNaughton was born in 1880 in Cambridge, Massachusetts, to parents Daniel MacNaughton and Lillias Boyd. He received a Bachelor of Science degree in engineering from the Massachusetts Institute of Technology in 1902.

His first job after graduation was as a building contractor working for F.B. Gilbreth in Boston. After moving to Portland in 1903, MacNaughton began working in the office of architect Edgar M. Lazarus.

== Career ==
The 1984 Portland Historic Resources Inventory identified 37 buildings associated with E.B. MacNaughton.

=== MacNaughton and Raymond ===
In 1906 MacNaughton formed an architectural and engineering partnership with Herbert E. Raymond, MacNaughton and Raymond. Raymond may also have trained as an engineer. The partnership existed until 1907 when Ellis F. Lawrence joined the firm. After the departure of Lawrence in 1910, MacNaughton and Raymond briefly resumed their partnership.

MacNaughton's designs at this time include the Sellwood Branch YMCA and the Blake McFall Company Building. He is credited with designing the 1906 Alexandra Apartment/Hotel building on NW 21st Place in Portland, although a set of architectural drawings for the building was found among the Lawrence papers, leading researchers to conclude that the design credit should go to Lawrence. MacNaughton and Raymond also designed the 1912 Clyde Hotel.

Relying on his skills as a building contractor, MacNaughton accepted the job of renovating the Marquam Building in 1912. Part of the building collapsed during the renovation, and MacNaughton was fired by owner Henry Pittock. An investigation concluded that weak bricks had been used in the original construction.

=== MacNaughton, Raymond, and Lawrence ===
The addition of Ellis F. Lawrence greatly increased the architectural skills at the firm. Among the surviving designs of MacNaughton, Raymond, and Lawrence are the Samuel G. Reed House and the Cumberland Apartments. Lawrence left the firm in 1910 to start his own company, and the two remaining partners continued as MacNaughton and Raymond.

=== Strong and MacNaughton ===
MacNaughton gradually became more interested in resource planning and asset management, and he formed a partnership with Robert H. Strong sometime after 1911, the Strong and MacNaughton Trust Company. Strong was an asset manager whose inventory included management of the estate of Henry W. Corbett, and his brother was managing director of the Ladd estate. Strong would soon become a commissioner at the Port of Portland.

In 1919 Portland mayor George Luis Baker appointed MacNaughton to the newly created planning commission. Other planners included architects A. E. Doyle and Ellis F. Lawrence.

The firm authored a series of newsletters in the 1920s that provided analysis and opinions about capital, real estate, taxes, merchandising, city infrastructure, and city planning. The firm also handled stock investments, and when the Portland Public Market was approved in the 1920s, Strong and MacNaughton was the transfer agent.

=== First National Bank of Portland ===
MacNaughton entered the banking industry in the mid-1920s when Frederic B. Pratt, owner of Portland's Ladd and Tilton Bank, suspected that he had been cheated by the previous owners. Pratt hired MacNaughton to analyze the bank's records and discover what had happened. MacNaughton became a vice president at the bank, and when the bank was acquired by the U.S. National Bank of Portland, Strong and MacNaughton were tasked with liquidating the assets.

In 1928 MacNaughton became a vice president at the First National Bank of Portland, and Strong and MacNaughton was disbanded. In 1932 during the Great Depression, he became president of the bank. He became chairman in 1947 and was scheduled to become honorary chairman in 1960.

MacNaughton served for a time as an associate professor of banking at the Stanford Graduate School of Business.

=== The Oregonian ===
MacNaughton became a director of The Oregonian publishing company in 1939, a position he would hold for 11 years. During his time on the board, the newspaper undertook a costly relocation and expansion. MacNaughton became president of the company in 1947 and soon began to look for a buyer. The company was purchased for $5.6 million by Samuel Irving Newhouse, Sr. in 1950, and MacNaughton's tenure ended.

=== Reed College ===
In 1908 the will of Amanda Reed, widow of Simeon Gannett Reed, established a board of five trustees to oversee Reed College. In 1919 the trustees voted to create a board of regents that would absorb the original five trustees and include six newly elected officers. MacNaughton was among the new regents, as was Reed architect A. E. Doyle.

MacNaughton served in various capacities at Reed for 24 years. He became president of the college in 1948 during a time of financial crisis. He raised faculty salaries, created a scholarship fund for students, and increased the size of Reed's endowment through donations. In 1952 when Reed was financially solvent, MacNaughton left his job as president.

== Partial list of honorariums and awards ==
The University of Oregon awarded MacNaughton an honorary doctorate in 1944 in recognition of his many years of service to the Oregon business community.

He received the William Freeman Snow Medal for distinguished service to humanity in 1952.

MacNaughton served as chairman of the ACLU Advisory Council from 1955 until 1960, and the E.B. MacNaughton Civil Liberties Award was created in 1962 in his honor.

== Death ==
MacNaughton died of cancer on August 24, 1960. He is buried at River View Cemetery.

== See also ==
- History of Portland, Oregon
