= Xiao Ye (restaurant) =

Restaurant in Portland, Oregon, U.S.

- Interactive map of Xiao Ye

Restaurant information
- Owners: Jolyn Chen; Louis Lin
- Chef: Louis Lin
- Location: 3832 NE Sandy Blvd., Portland, Oregon, 97232, United States
- Coordinates: 45°32′04″N 122°37′24″W
- Website: xiaoyepdx.com

Xiao Ye is a restaurant in Portland, Oregon's Hollywood neighborhood, in the United States.

== Description ==
Xiao Ye, which translates to "midnight snack" in Mandarin, is a restaurant at the intersection of Sandy Boulevard and 38th Street in northeast Portland's Hollywood neighborhood. Bon Appétit has said the restaurant has a "fun, unfussy design which includes mismatched vintage chairs in bold colors, patterned textiles, and checkered tile floors".

The menu has included grilled snapper with chipotle and chile negro butter, served with curtido on the side, as well as masa-mochiko madeleines, tom yum soup, pear and steak tartare, tomato toast, and Jolyn's Favorite Noodle V. 1, a pasta dish with sesame, Taiwanese black vinegar, and Lao Gan Ma.

== History ==
Chef Louis Lin and co-owner Jolyn Chen opened Xiao Ye in September 2023; the duo prefer to describe the cuisine as "first-generation American" instead of New American or fusion.

In 2026, the restaurant participated in Portland's Dumpling Week, as well as Strawberry Shortcake Week, which was presented by and in support of the James Beard Public Market.

== Reception ==
In 2023, Xiao Ye won in the Best New Restaurant category of Eater Portland's annual Eater Awards. Nathan Williams also included the business in the website's 2023 list of sixteen "standout spots" in the Hollywood neighborhood. In his review for the Portland Mercury, Ned Lannamann wrote: "As it stands, though, Xiao Ye is an artful misfire: the sort of place that, as Mr. Huang sadly appears to desire it to be, is really only best when the customers are a little drunk, a little high, maybe both and in any event extremely hungry." Xiao Ye was included in The Infatuation's 2024 list of Portland's best restaurants. Michael Russell ranked Xiao Ye number 36 in The Oregonian's 2025 list of Portland's 40 best restaurants.
