= Marquam Building =

Former building in Portland, Oregon, U.S.

Coordinates: 45.51925°N 122.67874°W

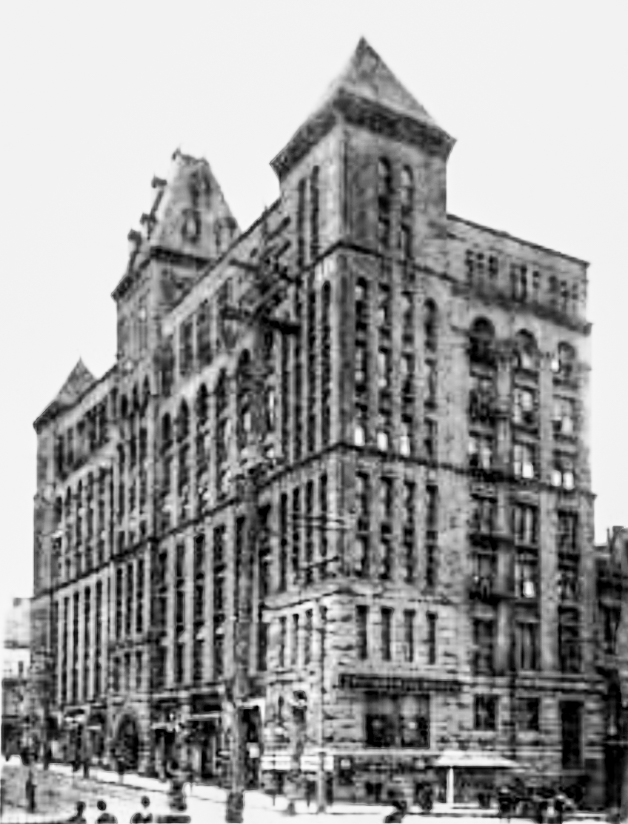
- Image courtesy of the Architectural Record

- Location within Portland, Oregon

General information
- Type: Office, theater
- Architectural style: Romanesque Revival
- Location: 600 SW Morrison Street, Portland, Oregon, United States
- Named for: Philip Augustus Marquam
- Completed: 1892
- Demolished: 1913

Height
- Height: 160 ft (49 m)

Dimensions
- Other dimensions: 200 ft (61 m) by 60 ft (18 m)

Technical details
- Structural system: Steel frame
- Material: Brick, sandstone, and terra cotta
- Floor count: 8
- Lifts/elevators: 2

Design and construction
- Known for: First modern office building in Portland, November 1929 collapse

Renovating team
- Main contractor: Ernest Boyd MacNaughton

The Marquam Building was an eight-story, Romanesque Revival office building in Portland, Oregon, United States. Named for Philip Augustus Marquam, the building has been called Portland's first skyscraper and first modern office building. The building resembled a structure designed by Seattle architect John Parkinson and Pennsylvania architect John B. Hamme as an entry in the Portland Chamber of Commerce design competition of 1890.

The demolished Marquam Building, formerly at the corner of SW 6th Avenue and Morrison Street in Portland, Oregon, is not to be confused with the Marquam Building at 2501 SW 1st Avenue. The demolished building was replaced by the American Bank Building.

== History ==
Philip Augustus Marquam acquired the lot at the corner of SW Sixth and Morrison from William W. Chapman in 1854 as payment of $500 in legal fees. Marquam resided on the property and constructed other dwellings, but in the late 1880s he began planning the Marquam Grand Opera House and the Marquam Building, adjoining structures that would cost him $600,000.

=== Marquam Grand Opera House ===
The Marquam Grand Opera House, a five-story structure adjoining the Marquam Building, opened in 1890 and was demolished in 1922. An early manager was future Portland mayor George Luis Baker. The opera house, later known as the Orpheum and the Baker Theatre, opened to highly complimentary reviews. A Portland newspaper, The Oregonian, called it "one of the neatest theaters of the west." Another review offered higher praise: "The Marquam...will eclipse all other such buildings in the northwest. It yields the palm to only one on the Pacific coast, the grand opera house in San Francisco, and that only to a small degree as regards size." But critics were not as complementary when describing the Marquam Building.

=== Marquam Building ===
Opening in 1892, the Marquam Building was Portland's first modern office building. The Oregonian described the architecture as "very imposing." Another critic described it as "rather gloomy and cheerless, like so many of the office structures designed under the spell of the Richardsonian Romanesque...It has no doubt all sorts of faults."

Rather than pay high prices to local brick suppliers, Marquam started his own brickyard, and he shipped cheaper bricks to Portland from San Francisco.

Marquam's ownership of the building ended in foreclosure in 1908.

=== Renovation and collapse ===
The Marquam Building was sold in 1912 to real estate speculator Henry Pittock, founder and publisher of The Oregonian. Pittock and his son-in-law, Frederick Leadbetter, intended to remodel the building to serve as headquarters for the newly organized Northwestern National Bank Company. Pittock hired general contractor Ernest Boyd MacNaughton to supervise the work.

Part of the building collapsed during renovation, possibly because of substandard masonry used in the original construction. After the collapse, discussion increasingly focused upon the need for a newer, modern building. In a letter to the editor of The Architect and Engineer, one writer stated that "...as Portland advanced from a sleepy overgrown village to a half-grown city, the building became a home for quack doctors and patent medicine fakers..." and that the bricks used in construction were soft and of poor material. He implied that the collapse was not a disaster but a blessing. Pittock fired MacNaughton and hired architect A. E. Doyle to demolish the Marquam Building and erect what would become the American Bank Building.

== See also ==
- Architecture of Portland, Oregon
- History of Portland, Oregon
