= Jackson Tower =

Historic building in Portland, Oregon, U.S.

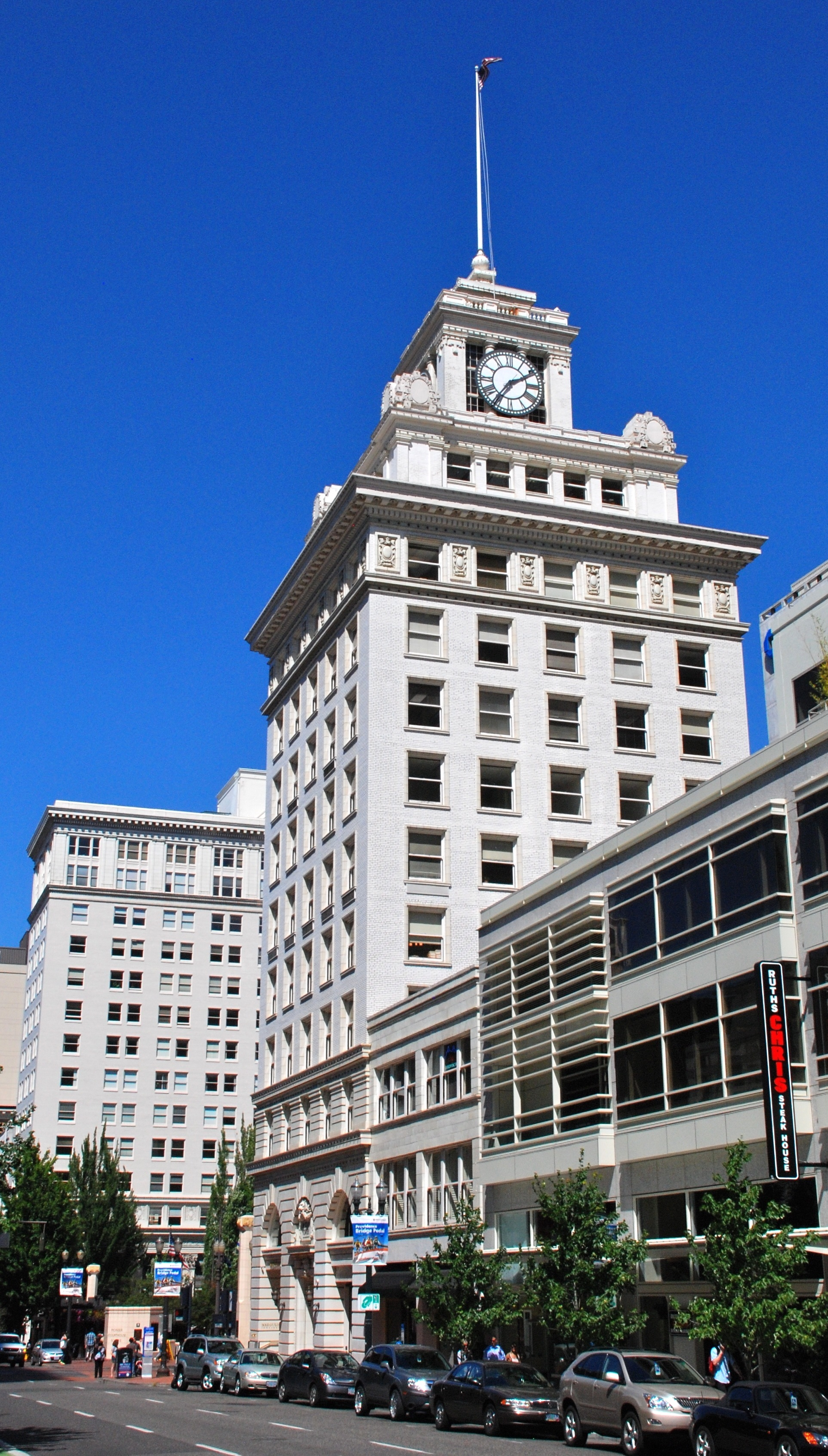
- Jackson Tower in 2011, viewed from the southwest

- Location within Portland, Oregon
- Former names: The Oregon Journal Building; Block 180 (Lots 7 and 8)

General information
- Status: Completed
- Type: Commercial offices
- Architectural style: Beaux-Arts
- Location: 806 SW Broadway; Portland, Oregon
- Coordinates: 45.518472°N 122.679814°W
- Construction started: 1909
- Completed: 1912
- Renovated: 1972

Height
- Antenna spire: 57.3 m (188 ft)
- Roof: 49 m (161 ft)

Technical details
- Floor count: 12; 2 below ground
- Floor area: 4,793 m^{2} (51,590 sq ft)

Design and construction
- Architect: Reid & Reid
- Main contractor: Dinwiddie Construction Company
- Journal Building
- U.S. National Register of Historic Places
- Portland Historic Landmark
- Built: 1912
- Architectural style: Beaux Arts
- NRHP reference No.: 96000995
- Added to NRHP: July 12, 1996

Jackson Tower, formerly The Oregon Journal Building, is a 12-story, 188 ft (57.3 m) glazed terra-cotta historic office building in downtown Portland, Oregon. It is located on the corner of Broadway and Yamhill Streets adjacent to Pioneer Courthouse Square.

== History ==
The building was constructed to house the operations of the now-defunct Oregon Journal. The Journal occupied the structure from its completion in 1912 until July 4, 1948, when the newspaper moved to the larger quarters of the former Portland Public Market building on the Portland waterfront. In 1951, the structure was renamed Jackson Tower to honor the newspaper's founder, Charles Samuel Jackson. The impressive clock tower results from the common practice, at that time, of newspapers' integrating such structures into their headquarters. Additionally, 1,800 light bulbs illuminate the tower after dark. There were originally 2,400.

The Jackson Tower was renovated in 1972, and placed on the National Register of Historic Places (as the Journal Building) in 1996. On September 12, 2008, the tower was purchased for $13.5 million by Jackson Tower Partners. The building was sold by that partnership for $7.45 million in 2023 to CRP Properties after it was foreclosed on by JPMorgan Chase Bank. In July 2026, the building was purchased for $3.25 million by Hadi Nouredine from CRP Properties.

== Details ==
The base of the building measures 100 ft × 100 ft (30 m × 30 m). The north portion of the ground floor has housed Margulis Jewelers for several decades. Each of the 1,800 light bulbs screw directly into the facade. In addition to the tower's illumination, at one time the clocks used to chime every 15 minutes, but the bells were moved to the Journal's new building on the waterfront in June 1948. Each clock face is 12.5 feet (3.8 m) in diameter.

== See also ==
- Architecture in Portland, Oregon
