= Samuel G. Reed House =

Historic building in Portland, Oregon, U.S.

- U.S. National Register of Historic Places
- Portland Historic Landmark
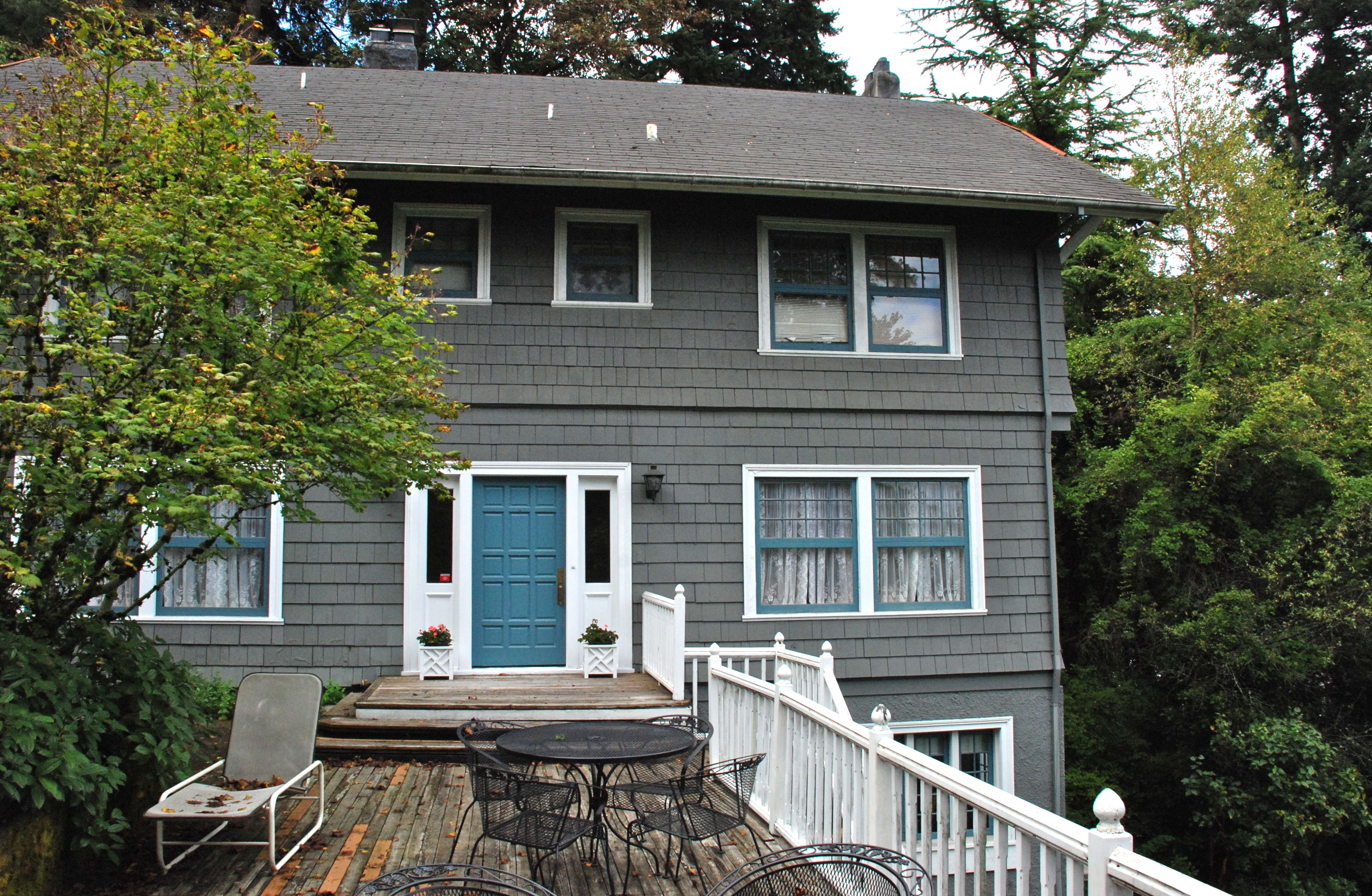
- The Samuel G. Reed House in 2013

- Location within Portland, Oregon Location within Oregon Location within the United States
- Location: 2615 SW Vista Avenue; Portland, Oregon
- Coordinates: 45°30′31″N 122°42′12″W
- Area: less than one acre
- Built: 1908
- Architect: MacNaughton, Raymond & Lawrence
- Architectural style: Bungalow/Craftsman
- MPS: Architecture of Ellis F. Lawrence MPS
- NRHP reference No.: 90001516
- Added to NRHP: October 17, 1990

The Samuel G. Reed House is a house located in southwest Portland, Oregon, listed on the National Register of Historic Places.

== See also ==
- National Register of Historic Places listings in Southwest Portland, Oregon
