= William W. Knight (publisher) =

American lawyer, politician, and newspaper publisher

Member of the Oregon House of Representatives from the 15th district
- In office January 14, 1935 – January 11, 1937
- Preceded by: A. G. Clarke
- Succeeded by: Glenn N. Riddle

Personal details
- Born: February 8, 1909 Winnebago, Minnesota, US
- Died: February 19, 1981 (aged 72) Portland, Oregon, US
- Party: Republican
- Spouse: Lota Hatfield
- Children: 3, including Phil Knight
- Relatives: Travis Knight (grandson)
- Education: University of Oregon
- Occupation: Lawyer; publisher of The Oregon Journal

William Wesley Knight (February 8, 1909 – February 19, 1981) was an American lawyer, politician, and newspaper publisher. He lived, worked in, and raised a family with his wife, Lota Hatfield Knight, in Portland, Oregon. Their son, Phil Knight, a high school and college athlete, went on to co-found Nike.

== Life and career ==
Commonly known as Bill, Knight was born on February 8, 1909, in Winnebago, Minnesota, to Fred A. Knight and Edith M. Knight, but grew up in Roseburg, Oregon.

Knight received his law degree from the University of Oregon School of Law in 1932.

In 1935, he was elected as a Republican to the Oregon House of Representatives from Douglas County, Oregon; Knight was 26. He served one term. "He also served as a Douglas County deputy district attorney under Guy Cordon, who later was a U.S. Senator." In 1939, Knight and his family moved to Portland, where he became "legal counsel for the Industrial Relations Association of Oregon."

Knight's 18-year tenure as publisher of The Oregon Journal began in February 1953, with the sudden death of then-publisher Philip L. Jackson from a heart-attack. Along with the newspaper came responsibility for managing the company's radio stations, including KPOJ AM & FM.

In 1959, the Journal and Portland's other newspaper, The Oregonian, were struck by a labor dispute over working conditions. The strike continued for several years, with US Senator Wayne Morse calling for mediation.

Knight retired in December 1971, at age 62.

== Family and end of life ==
Knight and the former Lota Hatfield (second cousin of Mark Hatfield), of Roseburg, were married on March 4, 1937. The couple had three children, including twin daughters in addition to their son, Phil. Mrs. Knight "devoted herself to her home and to the raising of her three children." William Knight died in Portland, Oregon, on February 19, 1981. Lota died on March 8, 2007, at age 91.

== Service and legacy ==
Knight had a term as president of the Oregon Newspaper Publishers Association, in 1970.

The William W. Knight Law Center, home of the University of Oregon Law School, is named after him, "in recognition of a generous gift given to the building campaign by his son, Philip Knight '58, UO alumnus and chairman and CEO of Nike." The facility was "dedicated September 15, 1999, by U.S. Supreme Court Justice Sandra Day O'Connor."
