= Ungar Building =

Building in Portland, Oregon, U.S.

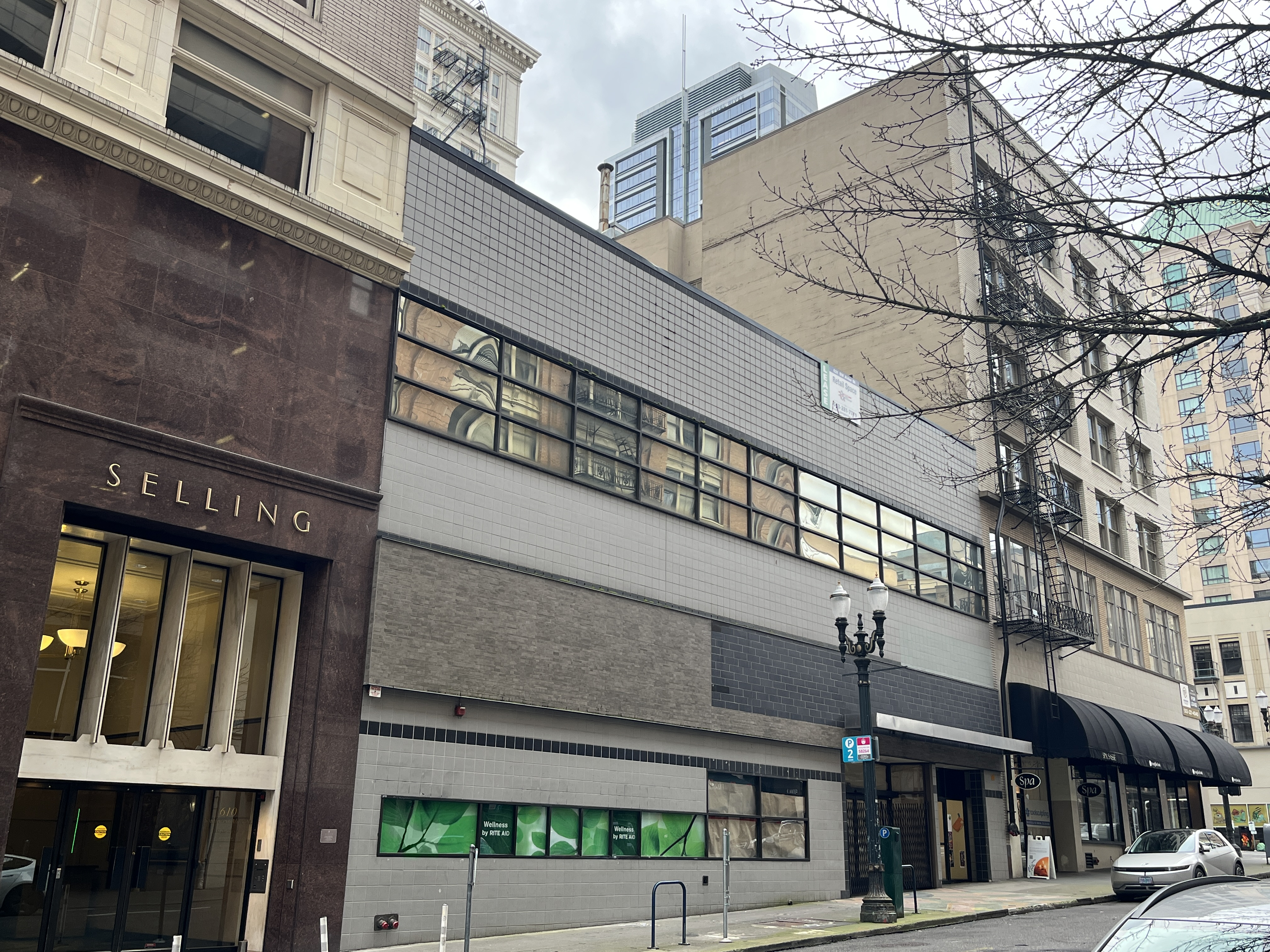
- The building's exterior, March 2025
- Interactive map of the Ungar Building area

General information
- Location: Portland, Oregon, United States
- Coordinates: 45.5198°N 122.6788°W

The Ungar Building is a building in Portland, Oregon, United States. It is set to become known as the James Beard Public Market Building.

The building has housed a Rite Aid location.

== See also ==
- James Beard Public Market
