= Sellwood Branch YMCA =

Historic building in Portland, Oregon, U.S.

- U.S. National Register of Historic Places
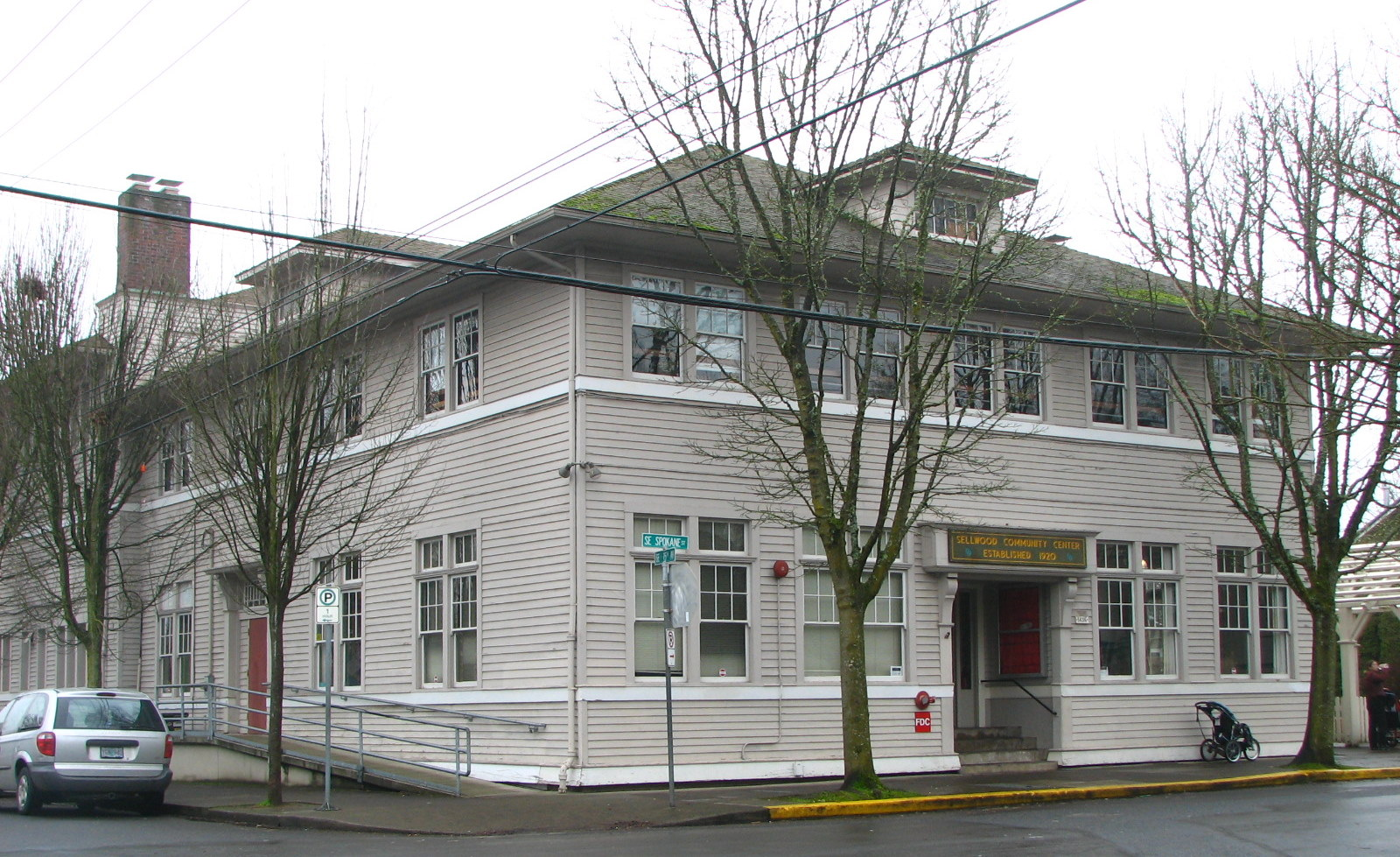
- Sellwood Branch YMCA in 2009

- Location within Portland, Oregon Location within Oregon Location within the United States
- Location: 1436 SE Spokane Street; Portland, Oregon
- Coordinates: 45°27′53″N 122°39′04″W
- Area: 0.23 acres (0.093 ha)
- Built: 1910
- Architect: Ernest Boyd MacNaughton
- Architectural style: American Craftsman
- NRHP reference No.: 06001033
- Added to NRHP: November 15, 2006

The Sellwood Branch YMCA, also known as the Sellwood Community Center, in southeast Portland in the U.S. state of Oregon, is a 2.5-story structure listed on the National Register of Historic Places. Built in 1910, it was added to the register in 2006.

Financial problems led to the building's take-over by the City of Portland in 1916 and its conversion from a Young Men's Christian Association (YMCA) or (Y) branch to a secular community center. Managed by Portland Parks & Recreation (PP&R), the building is equipped for basketball, yoga, music lessons, crafts, meetings, parties, weddings, and other recreational, social, and educational activities, and it contains offices and storage space.

== Description ==
External features of the 60-by-100-foot (18 by 30 m) wooden building include large dormers, wide eaves, and multi-pane windows, all similar to nearby single-family houses. The modified T-shaped structure occupies all of a 50-by-100-foot (15 by 30 m) lot and part of an adjacent lot that also contains a playground, added in 1986.

Resting on an elevated concrete foundation, the structure consists of two floors, a mezzanine level, and an attic. The first-floor spaces include meeting rooms, offices, a lounge, kitchen, and a former swimming pool converted to a tumbling-mat area. On the mezzanine is a gymnasium and a small storage room. The second floor, which originally contained dormitory rooms, has been converted to spaces for dancing, yoga, music, meetings, and storage. The attic is used for additional storage.

== History ==
During a public meeting in 1908 a group of Sellwood boys suggested the idea of creating a Y branch near where they lived. Founded in London, England, in 1844, the Y became popular in North America, and by 1870 about 650 American cities had Ys. In Portland, the Y was incorporated in 1868 as a religious society. Activities included Bible distribution, Sunday school recruitment, and charitable giving. As time passed, the Y focused less on religious matters and more on recreational and social activities. Admission to the Portland Y was opened to women in 1874, and the membership expanded. By 1909, the downtown Portland Y occupied an eight-story building shared by the Young Women's Christian Association (YWCA). The structure included a large auditorium, classrooms, gymnasiums, a swimming pool, and 200 dormitory rooms for single adults. Although the downtown Y was open to Sellwood residents, it was about 3 miles (4.8 km) away by streetcar, which not everyone could afford.

Agreeing with the boys' idea of 1908, Sellwood business and religious leaders decided to fund and build an independent branch Y, smaller than the downtown Y but including a gymnasium, swimming pool, and dormitory rooms. Although construction was completed on schedule, fundraising fell short of expectations, and four local churches were responsible for ongoing mortgage payments. Membership fees, dormitory rentals, and further fundraising efforts failed to raise enough money to pay the mortgage and sustain operations. To cut expenses, the Sellwood Y cut services and operating hours, and by 1915 the building was used only for meetings and social events.

Pressed for help by Sellwood residents, PP&R leased the building in 1916 and re-established recreational programs. By 1920, the City of Portland agreed to buy the building and to maintain it at public expense. PP&R has managed the building ever since. Amenities in the 21st century include an indoor basketball court, gymnasium, kitchen, space for meetings, parties, and weddings, and an outdoor playground and picnic tables.

== See also ==
- National Register of Historic Places listings in Southeast Portland, Oregon
