= Blake McFall Company Building =

Historic building in Portland, Oregon, U.S.

- U.S. National Register of Historic Places
- Portland Historic Landmark
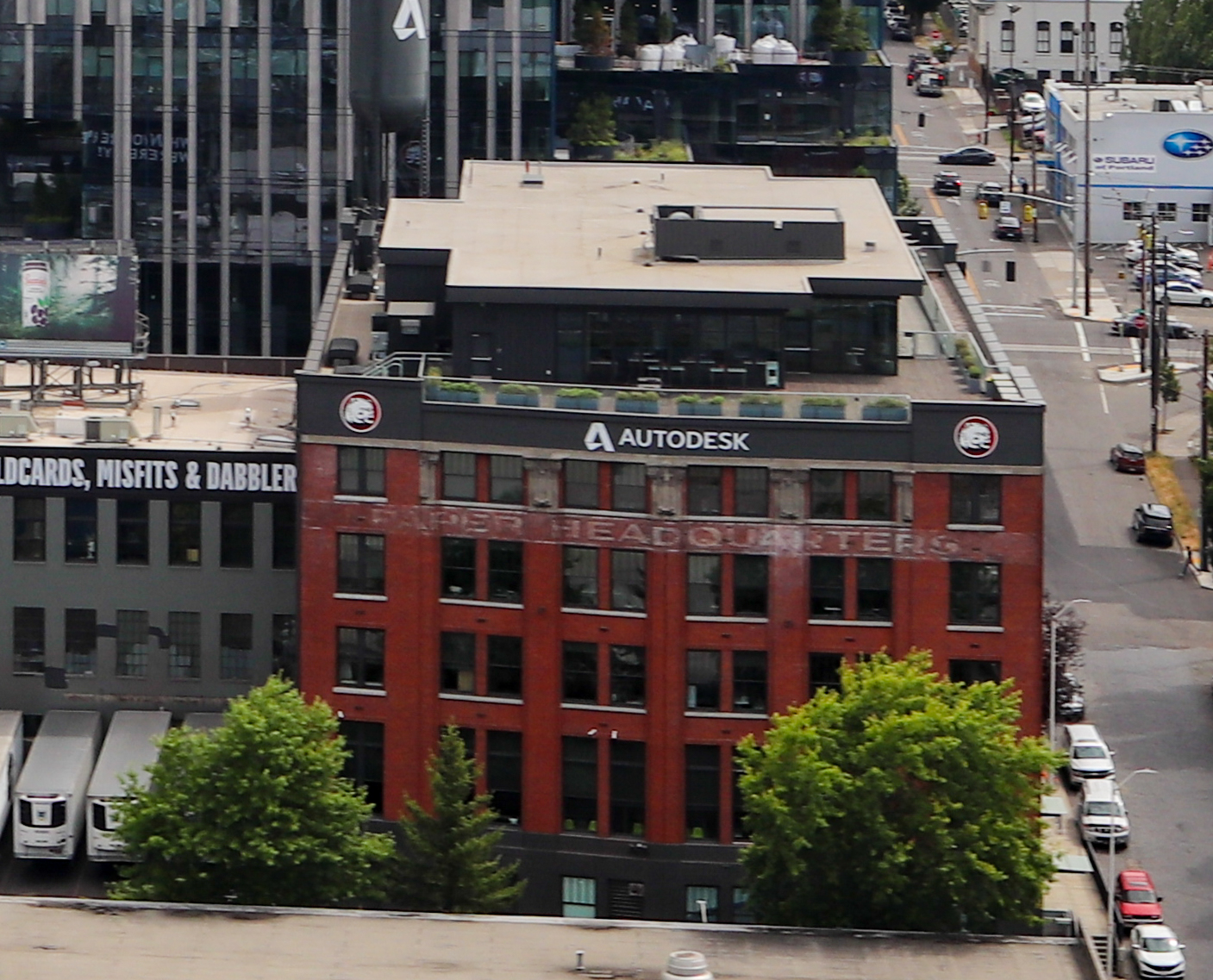
- Building in 2020
- Location: 215 SE Ankeny Street; Portland, Oregon
- Coordinates: 45°31′21″N 122°39′48″W
- Area: 100 by 200 feet (30 by 61 m)
- Built: 1915
- Architect: MacNaughton & Raymond
- Architectural style: Commercial
- NRHP reference No.: 90000371
- Added to NRHP: March 9, 1990

The Blake McFall Company Building, also known as the Emmett Building, in southeast Portland in the U.S. state of Oregon, is a five-story commercial warehouse listed on the National Register of Historic Places. Designed by McNaughton & Raymond of Portland and built in 1915, it was added to the register in 1990. The 100-by-200-foot (30 by 61 m) structure is representative of a group of timber-framed loft warehouses built in the early 20th century on the east side of the Willamette River.

== History ==
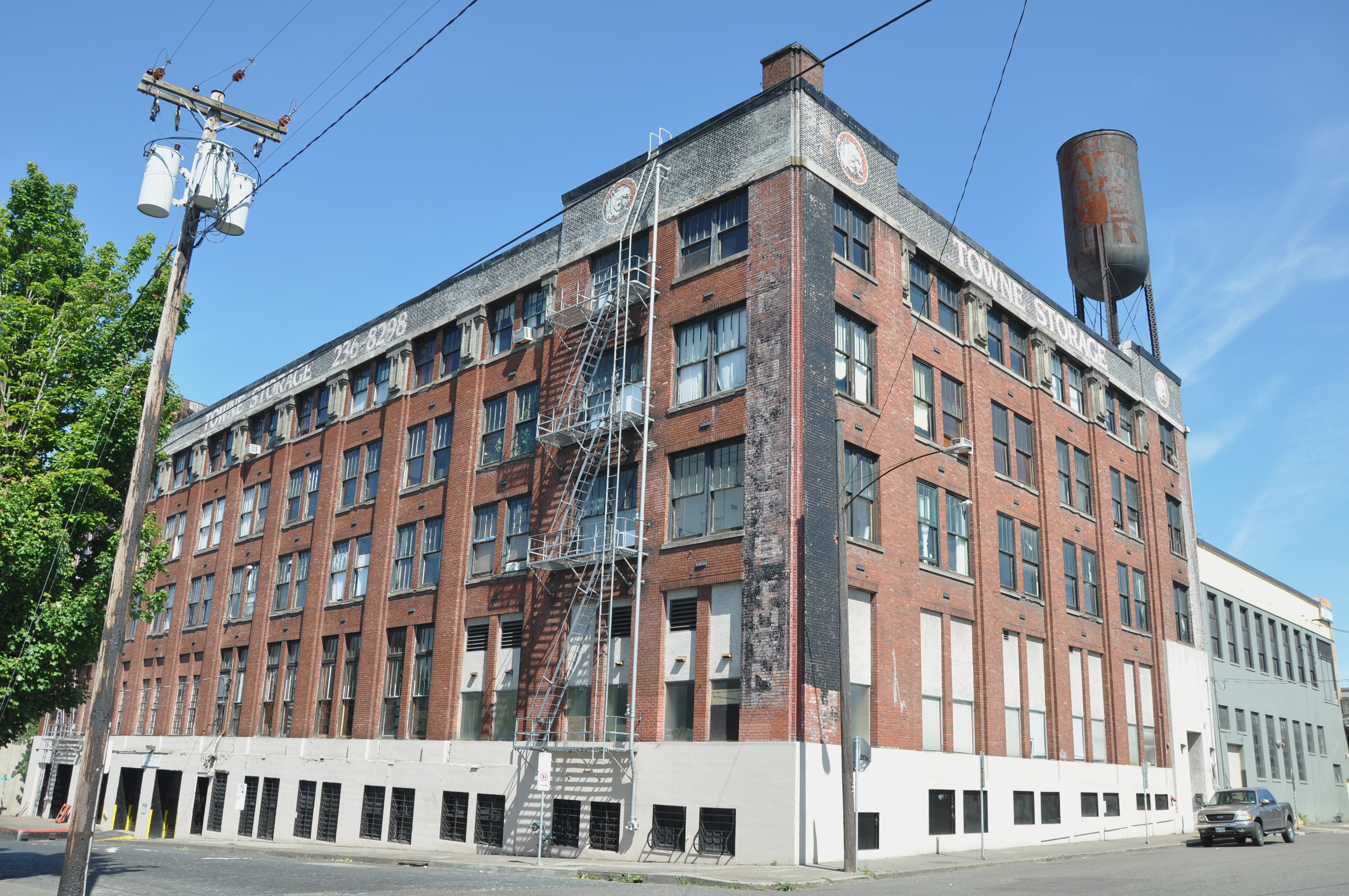
South and east faces of the building in 2011

Completion of the Steel Bridge over the Willamette River in 1888 had established a rail link between downtown Portland and East Portland. During subsequent decades, an industrial area developed along the river's east bank to store and re-ship merchandise arriving by rail and river steamer. Companies like John Deere, International Harvester, and Blake, Moffitt & Towne built multi-story warehouses in this area. The Blake McFall Company Building, near the east ramp of the Burnside Bridge, was at the northern edge of the warehouse district.

Blake McFall was a wholly owned subsidiary of Blake, Moffitt & Towne, which at that time was the leading wholesale paper distributor on the Pacific coast. It bought and re-shipped products ranging from newsprint to writing papers, wrapping, and bags. Served mainly by rail, the warehouse received large shipments that were subdivided in Portland and sent to the company's seven divisions in Oregon, Washington, and Idaho. A warehouse in Seattle gradually replaced some of the Portland-based functions, and by the 1940s shipping by truck had rendered the Portland warehouse obsolete. Blake, Moffitt, & Towne abandoned the building in 1957. Jeff and Lauri Gordon bought the building from the FDIC in 1992. They went on to create the first legal work spaces on Portland's east side and named the building Towne Storage.

Since 2019, software company Autodesk occupies the building.

== See also ==
- National Register of Historic Places listings in Southeast Portland, Oregon
