= Sam Jackson (publisher) =

American journalist (1860–1924)

C.S. "Sam" Jackson
- Born: September 15, 1860; Deltaville, Virginia
- Died: December 27, 1924 (aged 64); Portland, Oregon
- Occupation: Newspaper publisher
- Known for: Eastern Oregonian; The Oregon Journal
- Political party: Democratic
- Spouse: Maria Clopton Jackson
- Children: Francis C. Jackson; Philip L. Jackson

Charles Samuel Jackson (September 15, 1860 – December 27, 1924) was a prominent newspaper publisher in the U.S. state of Oregon. Jackson owned the East Oregonian from 1882 to 1913, developing it into a successful regional paper. He also founded and published Oregon Journal, which in over 22 years, he turned it into a "strong voice of the Oregon Country" and a rival of state's newspaper, The Oregonian. Author George Stanley Turnbull described Jackson as "a character which has been one of the most influential in the history of Oregon journalism."

== Early life ==
Charles Samuel Jackson was born on September 15, 1860, on his father's plantation in Deltaville, Virginia. Jackson was interested in printing from an early age. At 16, his father gave him $20 to help finance a trip to the Centennial Exposition in Philadelphia. Instead, Jackson used the money to buy a small hand printing-press and made money from printing jobs done for friends and neighbors. At 19, Jackson's father gave him $250 to traverse the American frontier to Portland, Oregon. He then arrived in Pendleton in April 1880. His first job in town was at a stage line agency. John Hailey hired Jackson because he looked like Abraham Lincoln. The job paid $10 a week. Jackson's father, thinking the wage too low, in a letter wrote "Don't take the money; you're not worth it."

== East Oregonian ==
As a second job, Jackson contributed local news stories about those who came and went on the stage line for the East Oregonian, a Democratic weekly newspaper. He also wrote some semi-editorial articles, signed "Sandy Bottom." In 1881, Lewis Berkeley Cox sold Jackson a quarter interest in the East Oregonian. Within the year, Jackson sold his shares back for $250 more than he paid. On January 13, 1882, Jackson purchased the entire paper for $3,500. At the time Jackson had only $5 to his name, so he persuaded lawyer J. A. Guyer to buy in as co-owner and loan Jackson the $1,750 needed for his half. Guyer was a silent partner while Jackson managed all aspects of the business. At the same time Jackson kept working his stage job until the railroad reached Pendleton in 1884 and the line was discontinued. Jackson increased print days from once to twice a week starting February 3, 1882. This helped him dominate the field. Jackson hired correspondents throughout Eastern Oregon and wrote editorials republished in other papers. Jackson expanded from semi-weekly to daily, except Sunday, on March 1, 1888.

Jackson was an aggressive journalist. He once said "Print the truth. Fight for the right. People like a fighting newspaper." His efforts made the East Oregonian "the most quoted, the most feared, and the best-loved paper east of the mountains." Jackson was a fighting editor in the literal sense. He got into fist fights in the streets to defend his opinions. One time Jackson was accosted by a man over one of his editorials. Jackson had accused the man of opposing a school tax levy because he made money from brothels and preferred to keep young girls uneducated. The man hit Jackson with a cane while he fought back with his fists. The day after the brawl, Jackson wrote: "A man who is afraid of bodily injury or personal attacks is not a newspaperman or capable of becoming one." Another time Jackson fought former EO editor J. H. Turner, turned around and then fought the man's nephew.

During the Pendleton years, Jackson was involved in various insurance, real estate and loan operations. As publisher, Jackson wrote in support of a single-tax system exposed by Henry George in his book Progress and Poverty. He also advocated for a Secret ballot. Jackson developed Eastern Oregonian into "a powerful voice in the region." By 1913, he still owned a third of the Eastern Oregonian, which at that time he sold (aside from two shares he kept for sentimental reasons) to the paper's editor Edwin B. Aldrich.

== The Oregon Journal ==
On March 10, 1902, A. D. Bowen and others started the Portland Evening Journal. The paper struggled to gain traction as the region was dominated by The Oregonian. Author George Stanley Turnbull wrote "The little Journal was unimpressive in those few months when it was struggling merely to keep alive." On July 23, 1902, Jackson, of the Eastern Oregonian, bought the Journal for a few thousands dollars. He changed the name to The Oregon Journal. In his first editorial at the helm of the paper, Jackson declared that:

The Journal in head and heart will stand for the people, be truly Democratic and free from political entanglements and machinations, believing in the principles that promise the greatest good to the greatest number – to ALL MEN, regardless of race, creed or previous condition of servitude.... It shall be a FAIR newspaper and not a dull and selfish sheet – [and] a credit to 'Where rolls the Oregon' country.

Few at the time believed the Journal could be a success. Jackson started with a second-hand press and 5,000 subscribers. He soon recruited journalists like Fred Lockley, who said Jackson in a letter to him wrote: "Fight for the right but not on lines of prejudice, revenge, or malice. To win, you must be bigger in mind and courage in every way than the other fellow. People like a fighting paper, a paper with a conscience - one that will fight for better conditions."

The Journal soon became the main (Democratic-leaning) competitor to Portland's (Republican-leaning) daily paper, The Oregonian. Jackson led the Journal for 22 years as owner, publisher and editor, until his death on December 27, 1924. His son, Philip succeeded him, serving as publisher for 29 years, until his death at the age of 59, in 1953. Maria Jackson remained involved in the business until her death in 1956, at the age of 93.

== Family ==
In 1886, Sam Jackson and the former Maria Clopton, also originally from Virginia, were married, in Pendleton. They had two sons, Francis C. and Philip L. Jackson, both born in Pendleton.

== Honors and legacy ==
In 1917, Jackson donated 88 acres (356,000 m²) on Marquam Hill in Portland to the University of Oregon Medical School. The site, then known as Sam Jackson Park, became part of the campus of the Oregon Health & Science University. The nearby street was named SW Sam Jackson Park Road and in 29129 the school constructed a building called Sam Jackson Hall.

In 1943, the SS Sam Jackson, a Liberty ship the late-publisher's widow sponsored and named in his honor, was launched.

In 1951, the former home of The Oregon Journal in downtown Portland, was renamed Jackson Tower in his honor.

In October 1960, four years after Maria Jackson's death, based on provisions in her will, The Jackson Foundation was established. According to the foundation's website, "The Foundation continues today as a permanent fund governed by the following language in her will:

The income from the trust shall be distributed by the trustees for use within the State of Oregon for charitable, educational or eleemosynary purposes and for the advancement of public welfare. The trustees shall have wide discretion in the selection of the particular purposes for which said distribution shall be made and shall select beneficiaries as they shall deem to be most appropriate and best calculated to promote the welfare of the public of the City of Portland or the State of Oregon, or both.

In 1979, Jackson was inducted by the Oregon Newspaper Publishers Association into the Oregon Newspaper Hall of Fame.

In 1981, "Alder Lea", a log house built for Jackson in 1912–15 on a 40-acre (16 ha) tract on the Clackamas River, for use as a summer retreat, was added to the National Register of Historic Places as the C. S. "Sam" Jackson Log House.
