= Cumberland Apartments =

Historic building in Portland, Oregon, U.S.

- U.S. National Register of Historic Places
- Portland Historic Landmark
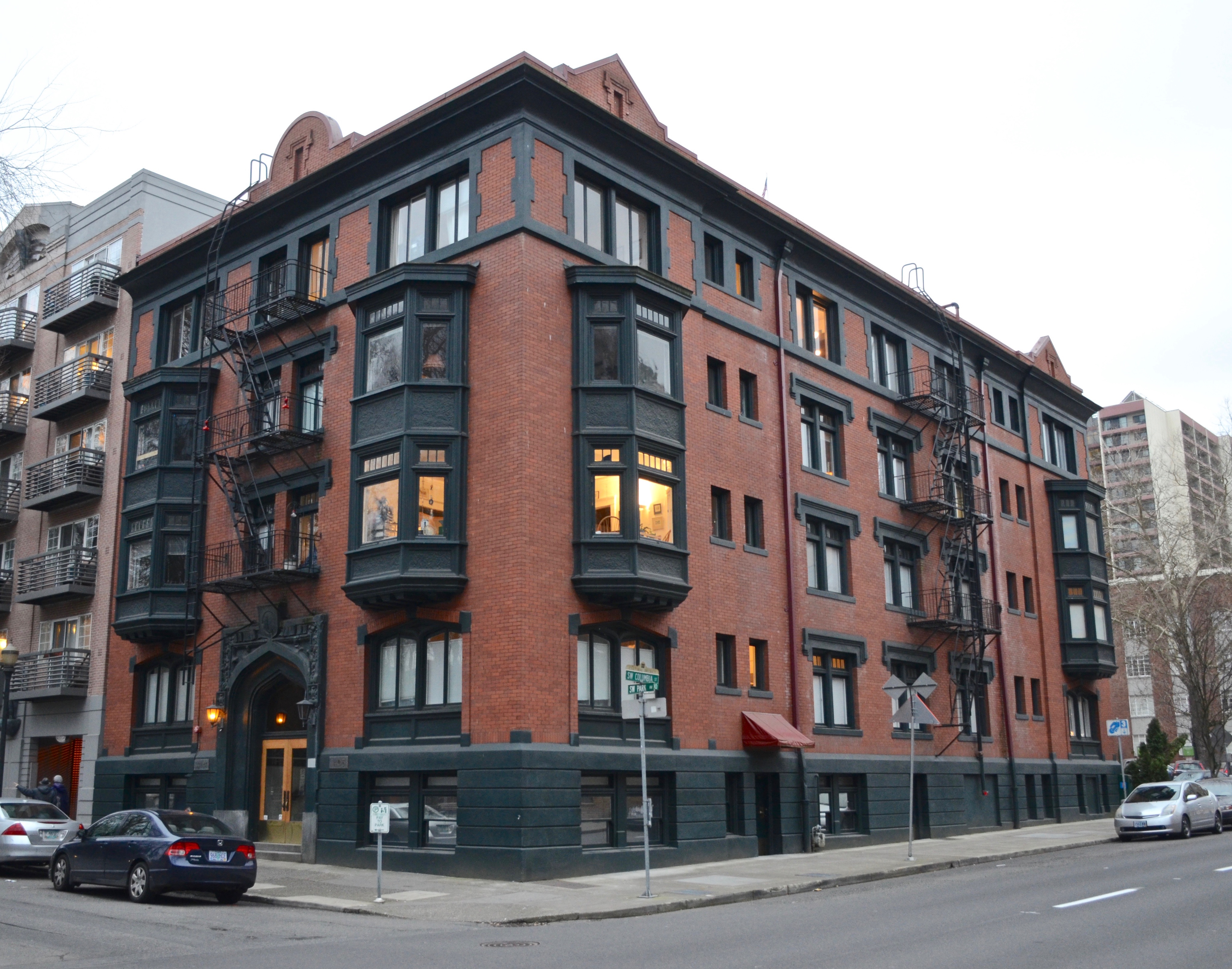
- The Cumberland Apartments in 2017

- Location within Portland, Oregon Location within Oregon Location within the United States
- Location: 1405 SW Park Avenue; Portland, Oregon
- Coordinates: 45°30′54″N 122°41′02″W
- Built: 1910
- Architect: MacNaughton, Raymond & Lawrence
- Architectural style: Tudor Revival, Jacobethan
- MPS: Architecture of Ellis F. Lawrence MPS
- NRHP reference No.: 90001509
- Added to NRHP: October 17, 1990

The Cumberland Apartments is a building complex located in downtown Portland, Oregon, that is listed on the National Register of Historic Places.

== See also ==
- National Register of Historic Places listings in Southwest Portland, Oregon
