= Portland Farmers Market (Oregon) =

Coordinates: 45.512°N 122.685°W

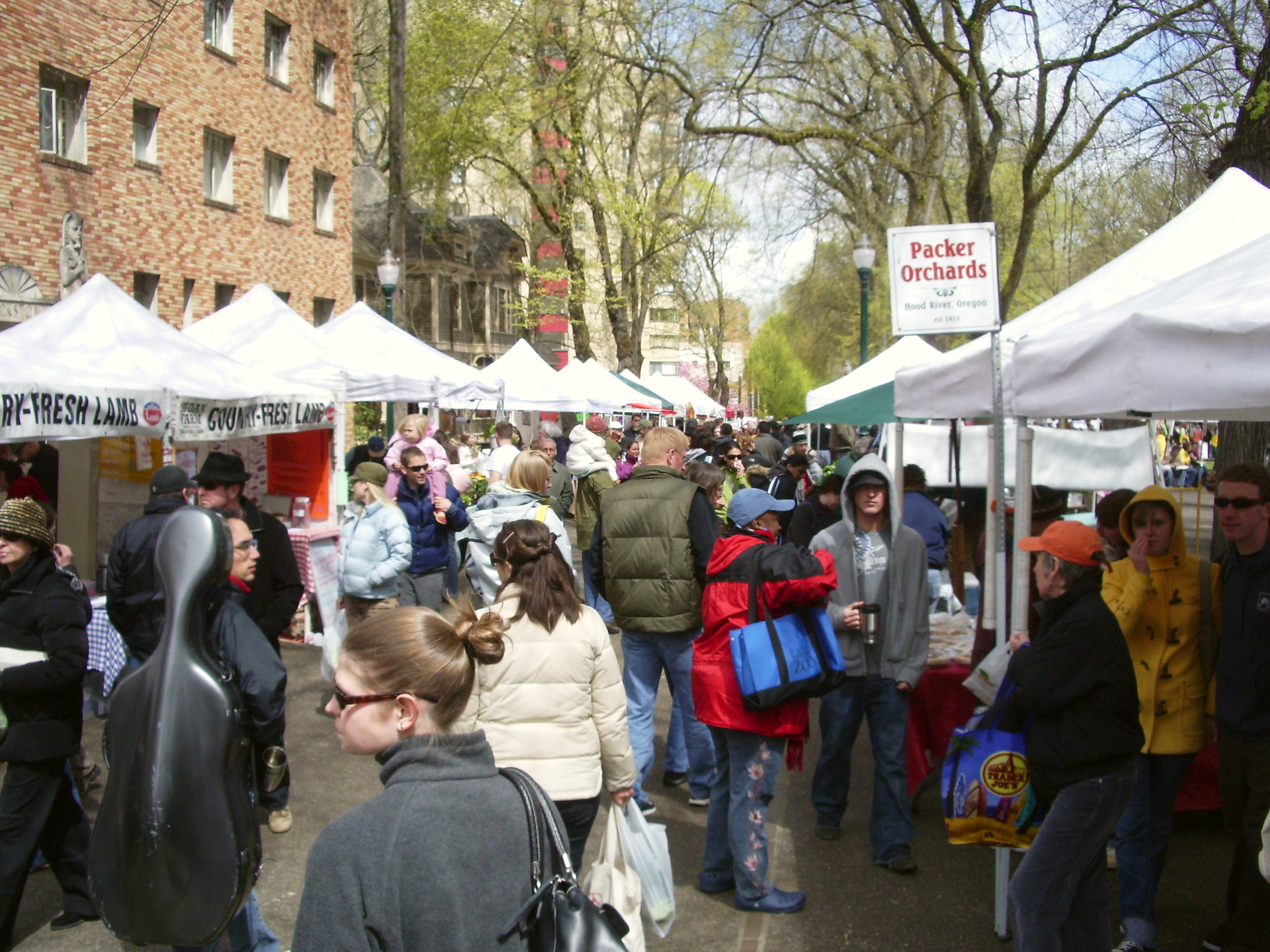
- Farmers Market booths in PSU park blocks; snow flurries this day limited number of shoppers
- Abbreviation: PFM
- Established: 1992; 34 years ago
- Founded at: Portland State University
- Type: Nonprofit
- Tax ID no.: 93-1085791
- Legal status: 501(c)(6) organization
- Headquarters: 240 N Broadway, Suite 129
- Location: Portland, Oregon, United States
- Members: 200+ vendors (2025)
- Website: portlandfarmersmarket.org

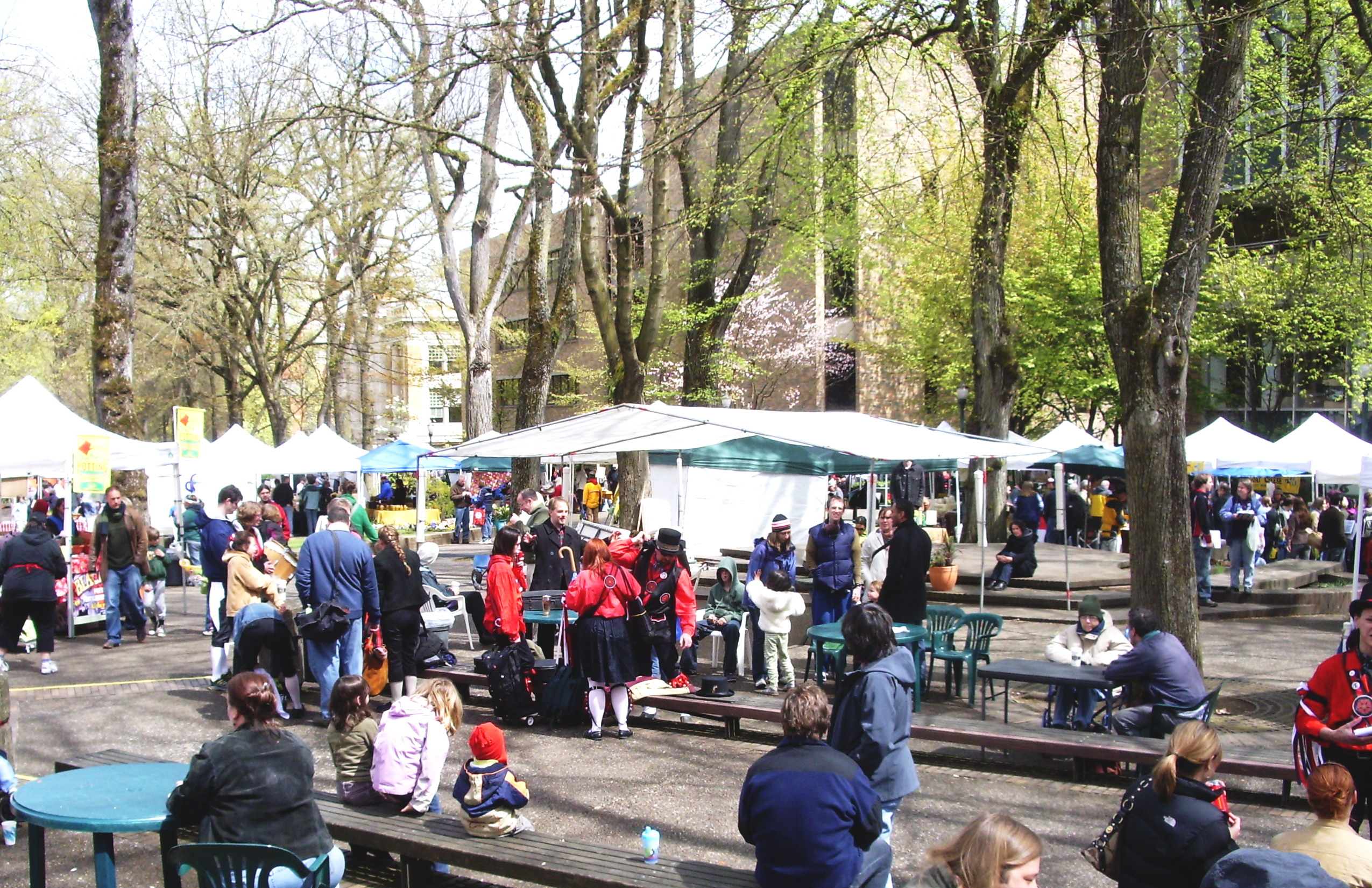
Some entertainment wrapping up in Portland Farmers Market

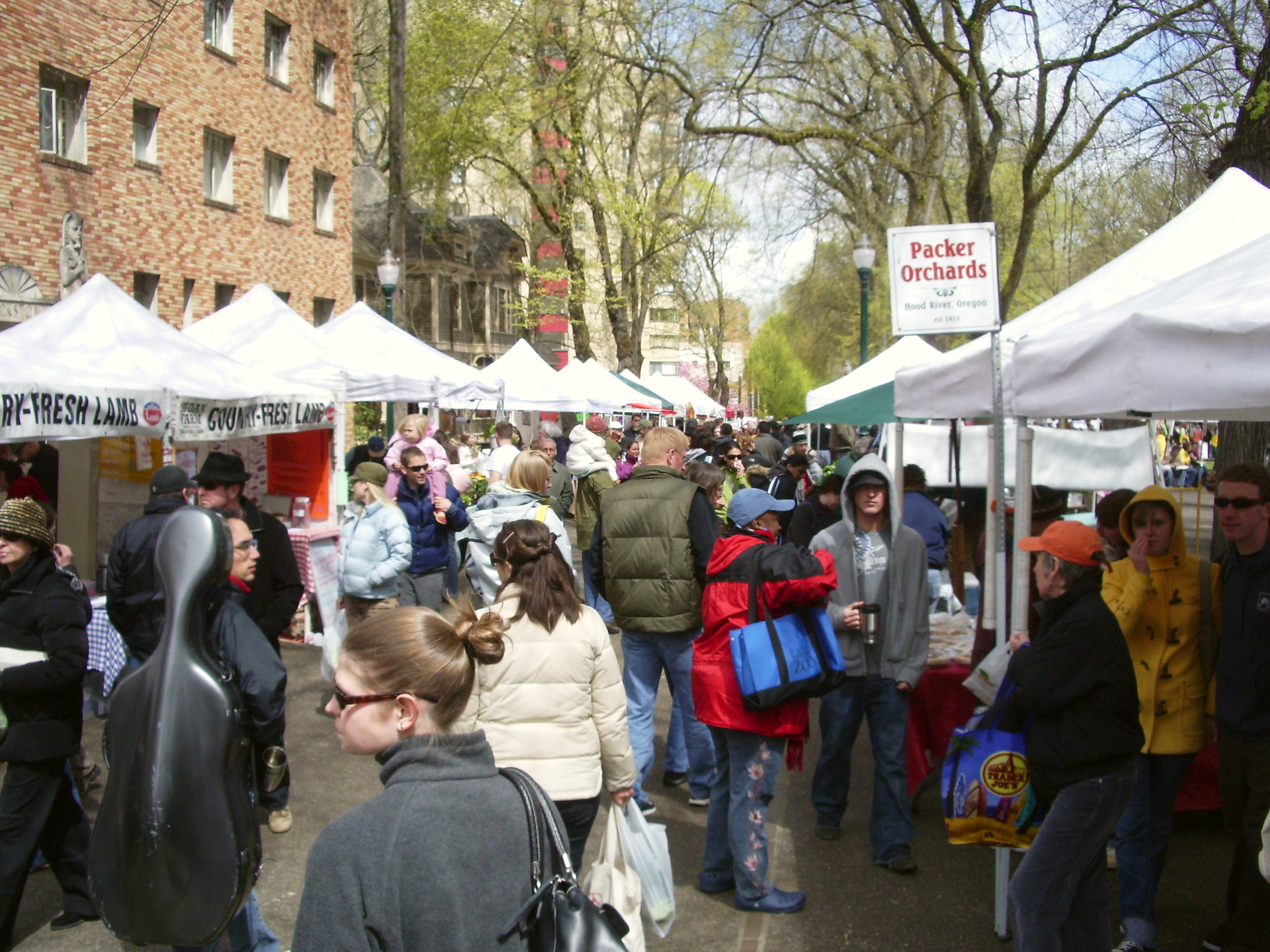
Farmers Market booths in PSU park blocks; snow flurries this day limited number of shoppers

Portland Farmers Market is an outdoor farmers' market in Portland, Oregon, United States. Up to two hundred vendors sell produce, fish, meat, dairy products, baked goods, and other agricultural products. It is rated one of the five best farmers markets in the United States based on variety of fresh local foods, numerous workshops and demonstrations, samples of unusual produce, numerous festivals, and non government funding by Eating Well Magazine. It was rated seventh in the country for its sustainable production and transportation, quality control, focus on education, food stamp support, general atmosphere, and community support by Greenlight Magazine.

The market's purpose is to connect Oregon's small farmers directly to consumers. Among the market's early supporters were local restaurant chefs. At its inception in 1992 there was difficulty finding vendors, but now there is a waiting list.

During peak season, the market serves 10,000 to 12,000 shoppers each week. Some of its special events—such as the annual "Summer Loaf" bread, wine, and cheese festival— became so popular they were spun off as separate events. The market has spawned about two dozen smaller farmers markets in the surrounding metropolitan area. The accelerating popularity of area farmers' markets has the Oregon Department of Agriculture considering stronger regulations and inspections.

== Locations ==
Portland Farmers Market operates five farmers markets in Portland, Oregon: the flagship PSU Farmers Market in the South Park Blocks, which operates year-round on Saturdays, and four seasonal markets: the Shemanski Park Farmers Market in downtown Portland, the King Farmers Market in Northeast Portland, the Kenton Farmers Market in North Portland, and the Lents International Farmers Market in Southeast Portland.

== See also ==
- Portland Saturday Market
- Portland Public Market
