= Journal Building (Augusta, Maine) =

- U.S. National Register of Historic Places
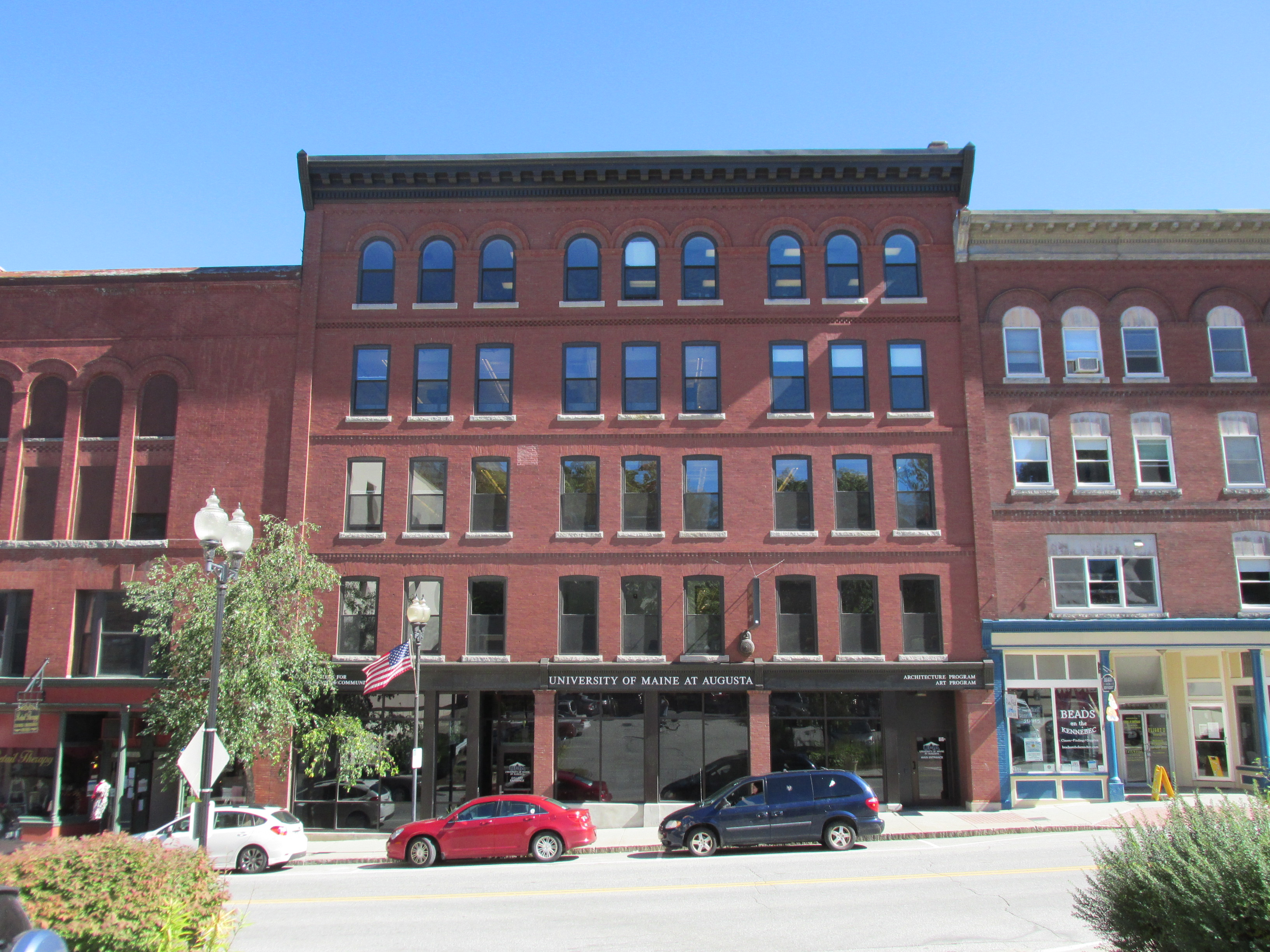

- Location within Maine Location within the United States
- Location: 325-331 Water St., Augusta, Maine
- Coordinates: 44°18′50″N 69°46′30″W
- Area: 0.25 acres (0.10 ha)
- Built: 1899
- Architect: Arthur G. Wing
- Architectural style: Renaissance
- MPS: Augusta Central Business District MRA
- NRHP reference No.: 86001692
- Added to NRHP: May 2, 1986

The Journal Building (also known as the Gannett Building and Handley Hall) is a historic commercial building at 325-331 Water Street in downtown Augusta, Maine. Built in 1899 to a design by Arthur G. Wing, it is a fine local example of commercial Renaissance Revival architecture. It was for main years home to Augusta's leading newspaper, the Kennebec Journal. It was listed on the National Register of Historic Places in 1986. It is now occupied by facilities of the University of Maine at Augusta.

== Description and history ==
The Journal Building stands on the east side of Water Street, Augusta's principal downtown thoroughfare, near its southern end. It is a five-story masonry structure, built out of red brick with granite trim. The ground floor has three storefronts, now remodeled with modern plate glass and metal, with brick piers separating them. The upper levels are nine bays wide, with the floors separated by courses of corbelled brickwork. Windows on the second through fourth floors are set in segmented-arch openings, while the top floor windows are set in round-arch openings, all organized in groups of three. The building is topped by a projecting modillioned cornice.

The Kennebec Journal was founded in 1825, and occupied leased spaces until the construction of this building in 1899. It was designed by local architect Arthur Wing, whose career was shortened by his untimely death in 1912. Although downtown Augusta has several Renaissance style buildings, including the one just to the south, this building is one of the least-altered of the style. It presently houses the art and architecture departments of the University of Maine at Augusta, with galleries on the ground floor, and is called Handley Hall by the university.

== See also ==
- National Register of Historic Places listings in Kennebec County, Maine
