= Carroll Public Market =

Produce market in Portland, Oregon, US

- Public market (dissolved)
- Location: SW Yamhill Street from First Avenue to Fifth Avenue; Portland, Oregon

The Carroll Public Market, also known as the Yamhill Street Market, was a fresh produce market that operated for twenty years on the sidewalks of SW Yamhill Street between First and Fifth avenues in Portland, Oregon, during the early decades of the 20th century. The organizational structure of the market eventually included 212 stalls and over 400 vendors who offered pricing by negotiation. One writer characterized the atmosphere as "loosely organized chaos." The market was dissolved and replaced by the Portland Public Market in 1934.

== History ==
Public markets often have been part of Portland history. An 1854 map of early Portland included two plats for market squares. One square on Fifth between Yamhill and Morrison was known as "Market Block," and it eventually became the site of two markets. In 1872 a mixed-use building, the New Market and Theater, included a public market at the site of Portland's current Saturday Market. Changing demographics forced the market to close in the mid-1880s.

Early in the 20th century, Evening Telegram editor and publisher John Francis Carroll began calling for a new public market, and in 1914 the Carroll Public Market was named in his honor. The market was located on the west bank of the Willamette River, near the site of the old Morrison Bridge, where vendors from farming communities outside of Portland could easily commute. Immediately the market became popular with customers seeking fresh produce. Customers dealt directly with farmers on the street and eliminated value added charges from middle men.

The market quickly expanded to include not only the sidewalk space on Yamhill but adjacent buildings as well. Business owner Fred Meyer leased floor space in buildings that bordered the market, and he rented the space to vendors by the square inch. Meyer believed that vendors needed only a 2-foot aisle within stalls.

Pedestrian and automobile traffic congestion along SW Yamhill Street continued to increase, turning the busy market into a target for urban planners in the 1920s. Planners wanted to move the market away from the sidewalks on Yamhill Street to a single building where inventory could be handled more efficiently and customers could be managed. In 1934, the Carroll Public Market was demolished in favor of the new Portland Public Market on the waterfront at SW Taylor Street.

== See also ==
- Downtown Portland
- History of Portland, Oregon
- Portland Yamhill Historic District
