= American Bank Building =

Historic building in Portland, Oregon, U.S.

- Northwestern National Bank Building
- U.S. National Register of Historic Places
- Portland Historic Landmark
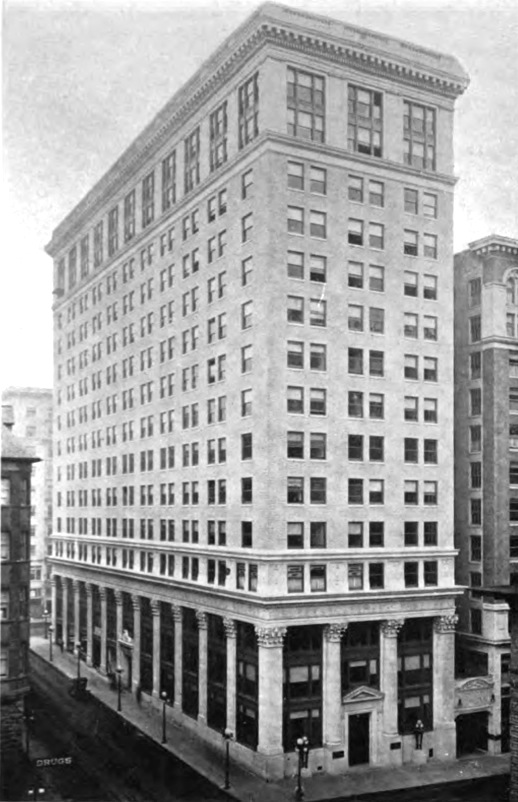
- Northwestern National Bank Building in 1913

- Location within Portland, Oregon Location within Oregon Location within the United States
- Location: 621 SW Morrison Street; Portland, Oregon
- Coordinates: 45°31′10″N 122°40′45″W
- Built: 1913
- Architect: A. E. Doyle
- NRHP reference No.: 96001001
- Added to NRHP: September 12, 1996

The American Bank Building is a 15-floor building in Portland, Oregon, U.S. It stands 63 metres (207 ft) tall, and was built in 1913. It replaced the Marquam Building.

== History ==
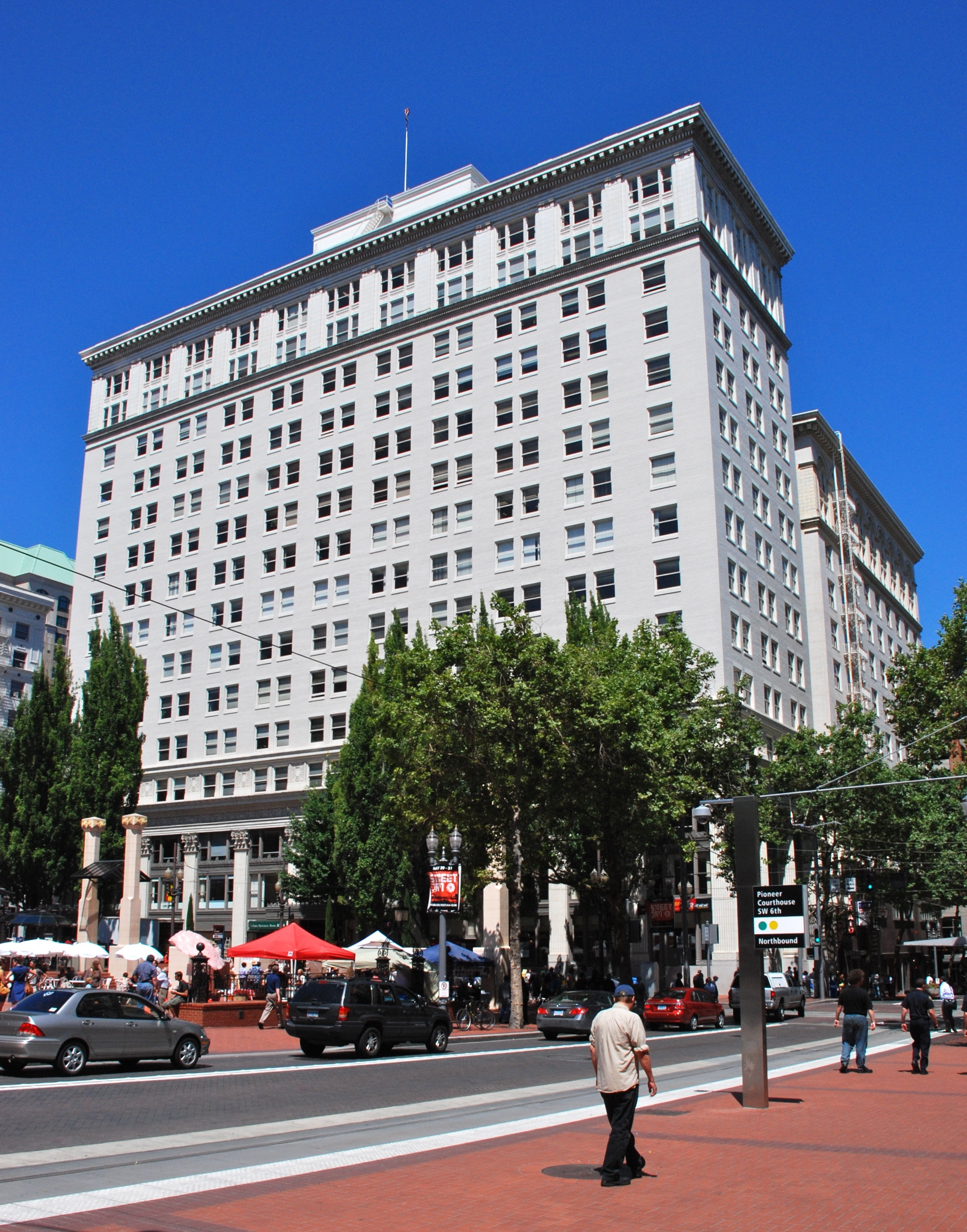
The building in 2011

The building was the tallest in the city for 14 years until surpassed by the Public Service Building in 1927. Designed by A. E. Doyle, it is located at 621 SW Morrison Street, and was formerly known as the Northwestern National Bank Building. The building was added to the National Register of Historic Places in 1996. In 2000, Transamerica Asset Management paid $21.7 million to City Center Retail to acquire the building. Transamerica then sold it to SKB Portland Office Investments LLC in 2002 for $22.3 million, who then sold the tower in 2008 for $35.2 million to LaeRoc Partners. In July 2014, the building was sold for $45 million to Chilean company Independencia S.A. It was sold in September 2023 to Portland-based Menashe Properties for $13.6 million.
