= The Oregon Journal =

Daily newspaper in Portland, 1902 to 1982

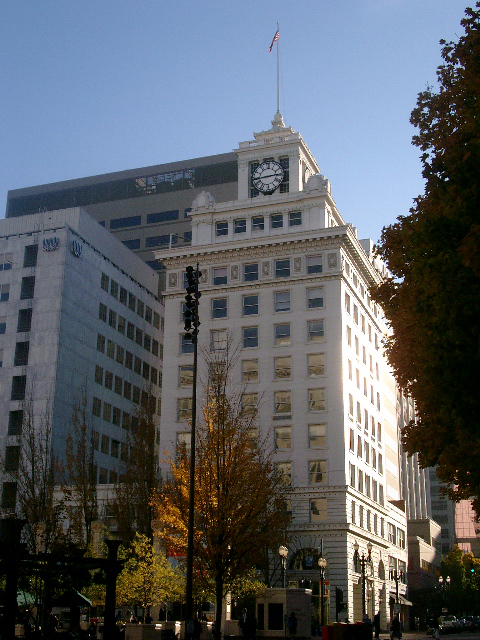
- Jackson Tower
- Type: Daily newspaper
- Format: Broadsheet
- Owner(s): C.S. Jackson & heirs; S.I. Newhouse
- Publisher: C.S. Jackson; Philip L. Jackson; William W. Knight
- Founded: 1902
- Ceased publication: September 4, 1982
- Political alignment: Democratic
- Headquarters: Jackson Tower, Broadway and Yamhill, Portland, Oregon
- Circulation: 201,421 daily 217,808 Sunday (as of 1948)

The Oregon Journal was Portland, Oregon's daily afternoon newspaper from 1902 to 1982. The Journal was founded in Portland by C. S. "Sam" Jackson, publisher of Pendleton, Oregon's East Oregonian newspaper, after a group of Portlanders convinced Jackson to help in the reorganization of the Portland Evening Journal. The firm owned several radio stations in the Portland area. In 1961, the Journal was purchased by S.I. Newhouse and Advance Publications, owners also of The Oregonian, the city's morning newspaper.

== Founding ==
The Portland Evening Journal was first published on March 10, 1902. This newspaper began as a campaign paper owned by A. D. Bowen, with William Wasson as the first editor. However, within a few months the paper had floundered and was being liquidated. In July 1902, the Evening Journal, was taken over by C.S. "Sam" Jackson, who had been the publisher of the East Oregonian based in Pendleton. Jackson renamed the paper The Oregon Daily Journal. In his first editorial as publisher of the Journal, on July 23, 1902, Jackson declared:

"The Journal in head and heart will stand for the people, be truly Democratic and free from political entanglements and machinations, believing in the principles that promise the greatest good to the greatest number – to ALL MEN, regardless of race, creed or previous condition of servitude.... It shall be a FAIR newspaper and not a dull and selfish sheet – [and] a credit to 'Where rolls the Oregon' country."

== The Journal at its height ==
Sam Jackson served as the Journal's editor and publisher for 22 years, from July 1902 until his death in 1924. He was succeeded by his son, Philip L. Jackson, who, following his father's footsteps, ran the newspaper for 29 years, expanding into broadcasting.

Under the Jacksons' leadership, the Journal competed with the state's major newspaper, The Oregonian, also based in Portland, with the Journal touting itself as the "strong voice of the Oregon Country." The paper was involved in a number of early 20th century crusades for reform, including better control of Oregon timberlands, adoption of the initiative, referendum and recall laws, direct election of U.S. senators, pure milk, and dredging of the Columbia River navigation channel to allow development of Portland as a major world port.

The Journal ventured into radio, purchasing KOIN radio (AM 970). In 1932, the Journal purchased its second station, KALE (970 AM). In 1946 KOIN was sold to Field Enterprises,

In 1947, the Journal became the first newspaper in the country to employ a helicopter on a regular basis to gather news photographs.

On June 6, 1948, KALE became KPOJ, standing for, Portland Oregon Journal. Also on this date KPOJ-FM (98.7) was launched.

The Journal's circulation peaked in 1948, with daily sales of 201,421 and Sunday circulation of 217,808.

== Transition and decline ==
In 1953, Philip Jackson died from heart disease. William W. Knight, who had been the paper's legal counsel, was brought in as its new publisher. C.S. Jackson's widow, Maria Clopton Jackson, died just a few years later, in 1956. With the successive deaths of C.S. Jackson II, Philip Jackson, and Maria Jackson, no family heirs were left to oversee the business and its operations. In this era, afternoon newspapers began their decline due to the rise of television, changing commuting patterns and other forces. The paper's economic vitality was further sapped by a lengthy strike against both Portland newspapers that began in November 1959, and by the competing Portland Reporter newspaper that was launched by striking workers. The newspapers published a joint strike edition, but while separate publication of the Journal resumed in 1960, its circulation never approached pre-strike levels.

Although the will of C.S. Jackson's widow, Maria Clopton Jackson, had specified that the newspaper's stock should be transferred to its employees upon her death, the trustees of her estate challenged that decision in court. Eventually, the courts ruled that the provision was written in wishful, not binding language.

In 1961 the trustees, believing that losses from the strike could bankrupt the paper and deprive the foundation of much of its principal, sold the Journal to The Oregonian's publisher, S. I. Newhouse, for $8 million. This amount was twice the bid made by an Oregon group. Newhouse had acquired The Oregonian, Portland's morning daily, in 1950. Newhouse consolidated production and business operations of the two newspapers in The Oregonian's building while keeping their editorial staffs separate. As a result of the Newhouse acquisition, publication of the Journal's Sunday edition was discontinued. The company's radio stations were sold in 1961 to make way for the Journal's sale.

The Journal never recovered the readership lost in the 1959 strike. Its circulation steadily declined through the 1960s and 1970s.

== Final decade(s) ==
William Knight continued as publisher, retiring in 1971. Other key creative forces in the paper's final decades included Editor Donald J. Sterling Jr., columnists Dick Fagan (creator of Mill Ends Park, the world's smallest park) and Doug Baker, Sports Editor George Pasero and prize-winning photographer David Hume Kennerly.

Under the terms of sale of the Journal by The Jackson Foundation, the newspaper was to remain under "independent editors until 1981". In 1982, the Journal ceased publication due to declining circulation and advertising revenues. Most Journal reporters and many of the paper's features were moved into a revamped Oregonian. The final edition of The Oregon Journal was published on September 4, 1982.

== Awards and honors ==
- Founding publisher, C.S. Jackson, inducted into the Oregon Newspaper Hall of Fame, 1979
- Editor, Donald J. Sterling Jr., inducted into the Oregon Newspaper Hall of Fame, 1983

== Locations ==
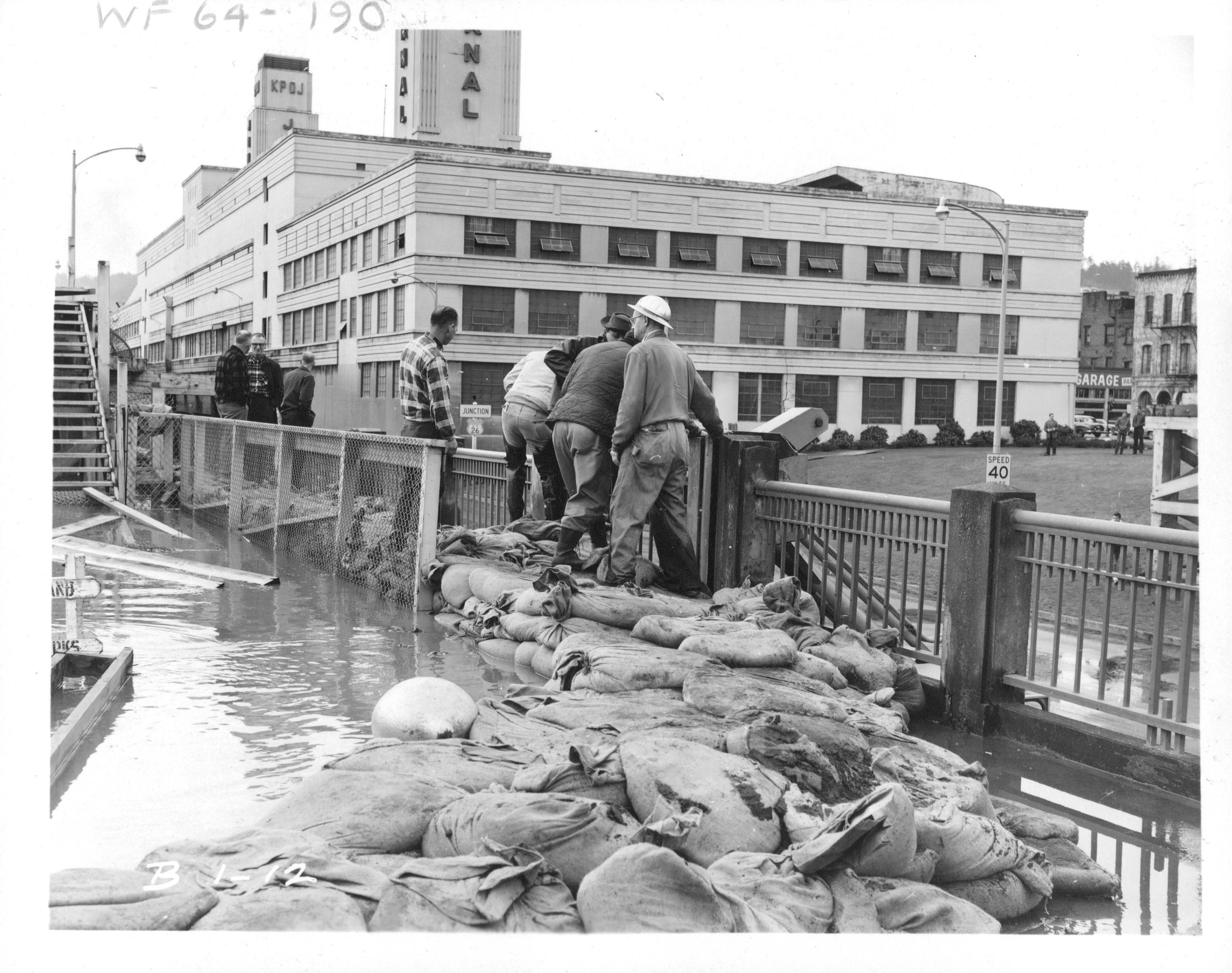
The Oregon Journal Building of 1948–61 (former Portland Public Market building) during the Christmas flood of 1964

The Journal was published at four downtown Portland locations during its 80-year history. From 1902 to 1912, it was headquartered in the Goodnough Building at Fifth and Yamhill Streets. In 1912, the newspaper moved to a 12-story building it had constructed at Southwest Broadway and Yamhill Streets. (The iconic Portland building, now known as Jackson Tower, has been on the National Register of Historic Places since 1996.) The paper had outgrown that structure by the 1940s, and in 1948, the Journal moved to a three-block-long structure on SW Front Avenue that had originally been constructed in 1933 as the Portland Public Market. That building was home to the Journal until the paper was acquired by Newhouse in 1961. The building stood empty and deteriorating until it was demolished in 1969; the site is now part of Tom McCall Waterfront Park.

== Archives and legacy ==
Archives of the Journal are maintained by The Oregonian.

The firm's legacy lives on in the airwaves, as well: besides KOIN-TV (now owned by Nexstar and still a CBS affiliate), KOIN today is KUFO; FM 101.1 is now KXL-FM; KALE is KKPZ; and KPOJ-FM is KUPL. The current KPOJ at 620 (a sports radio station since 2012) is unrelated in any way to the Journal and its broadcast division, and the calls were exploited in an unsuccessful attempt to mine nostalgia value during a 2003 conversion of that station to an oldies format.

== See also ==
- Jackson Tower
- Portland Public Market
- Larry Smyth
