= Portland Public Market =

Coordinates: 45.516°N 122.673°W

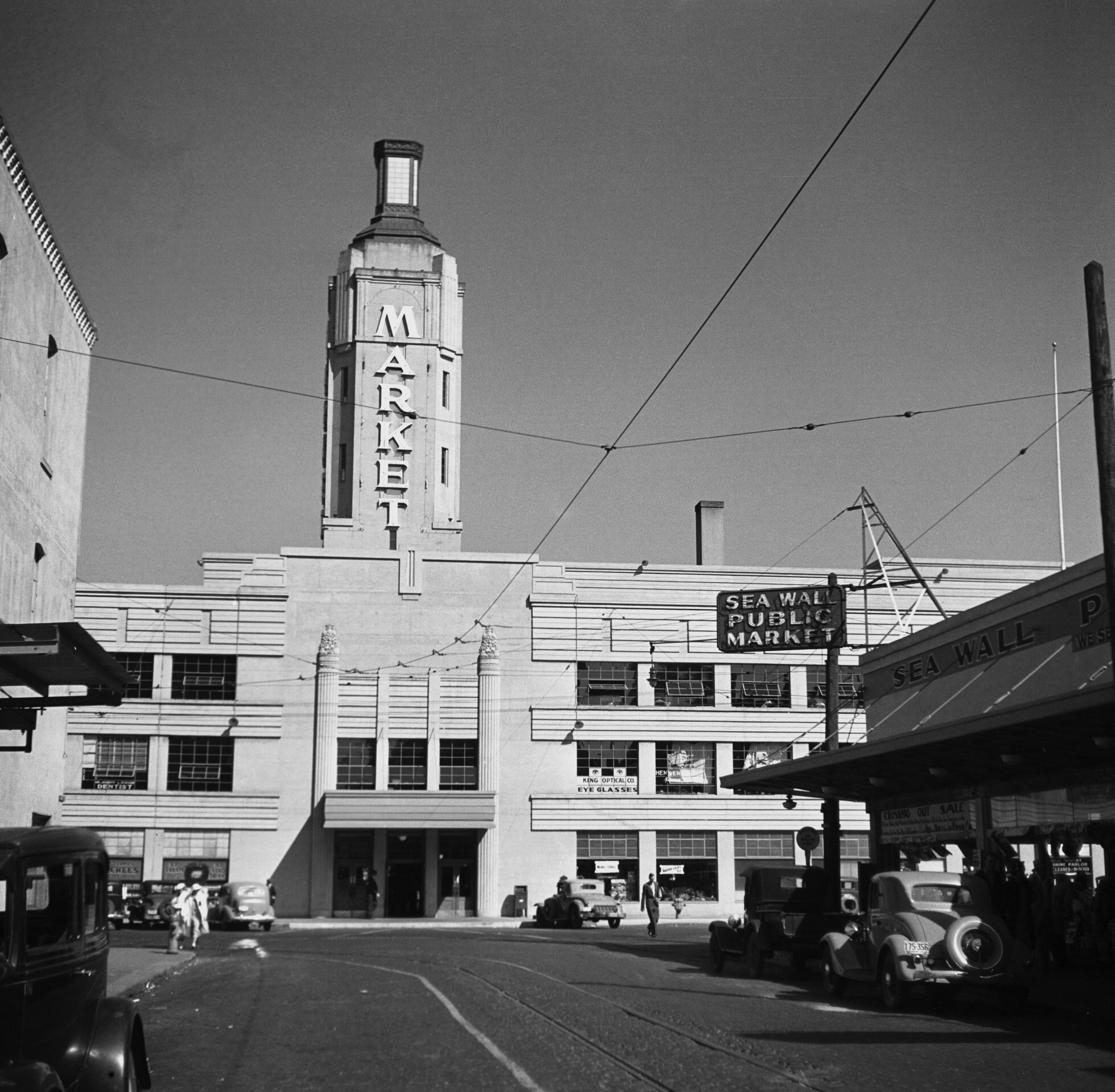
The original Portland Public Market building, with an eleven-story entryway tower in 1936. This view is looking east on Yamhill St. at Front St.

The Portland Public Market was a public market in Portland, Oregon, United States, built in 1933 at a widely advertised cost of $1 million ($19 million in 2024). Controversial and ambitious, it was intended to replace the Carroll Public Market, centered at southwest Fifth and Yamhill Streets; the Portland Public Market was never popular and was in financial trouble virtually from the day it opened.

The conception and siting of the market was rooted in heavy corruption and graft; Mayor George Luis Baker and city commissioner John Mann, among others, were clearly heavily involved. A recall effort was organized: it went to the ballot, though signatures for the recall petition were mysteriously stolen during a break-in, and the house of one of the two leaders of the recall was bombed. Baker was acquitted on the market corruption charges days before the recall vote, which was narrowly defeated and failed to remove him from office.

Three stories tall with eleven-story towers, three blocks long, and with features including a gas station, rooftop parking, and a 500-seat auditorium, it was primarily a novelty, and struggled to retain tenants from its 1933 opening until finally closing in 1942. The architect was William G. Holford.

The building was leased to the U.S. Navy in 1943, then sold to The Oregon Journal in July 1946, for use as the newspaper's offices and operations plant beginning in 1948. After publishing from there for 13 years, the paper vacated the building in 1961, and it stood unused until purchased by the City of Portland in 1968. The building was demolished the following year to make way for an expansion of Harbor Drive, which itself was replaced in 1974 by Tom McCall Waterfront Park.

There is currently no permanent public market in the city, although plans are in progress to build the James Beard Public Market.

== See also ==
- Portland Farmers Market (Oregon)
- Portland Saturday Market
