= KILT =

KILT may refer to:

- KILT-FM, a radio station (100.3 FM) licensed to Houston, Texas, United States
- KILT (AM), a radio station (650 AM) licensed to Pasadena, Texas, United States
  - KIKK (AM), a radio station (610 AM) licensed to Houston, Texas, United States, that used the call sign KILT from 1961 to 2026

== See also ==
- kilt, a traditional Highland Scottish garment
