= KEX =

KEX may refer to:

- KEX (AM), a radio station (1190 AM) licensed to Portland, Oregon, United States
- KEX Engine, a game engine
- KEX Hotel, an Iceland-owned hotel in Portland, Oregon, United States
- Kex, the name of a Mandalorian in Star Wars: Knights of the Old Republic II: The Sith Lords
- Kansai Commodities Exchange, a futures exchange in Japan
- The NYSE ticker symbol for the Kirby Corporation
- The dried stems and seeds of the Poison hemlock or similar umbelliferous plants
- File extension .kex for KEDIT KEXX macros, a subset of REXX
- Potassium ethyl xanthate
- A cryptographic key exchange
- Kex, a Hungarian rock band
