= KKCW =

Adult contemporary radio station in Beaverton–Portland, Oregon

- Beaverton, Oregon; United States
- Broadcast area: Portland metropolitan area
- Frequency: 103.3 MHz (HD Radio)
- Branding: K103

Programming
- Format: Adult contemporary
- Subchannels: HD2: Latin pop/AC "Magic"
- Affiliations: Compass Media Networks

Ownership
- Owner: iHeartMedia, Inc.; (iHM Licenses, LLC)
- Sister stations: KEX, KFBW, KKRZ, KLTH, KPOJ, KXJM

History
- First air date: February 24, 1984
- Former call signs: KTJA (1982–1984, CP)

Technical information
- Licensing authority: FCC
- Facility ID: 68210
- Class: C
- ERP: 100,000 watts
- HAAT: 470 meters (1,540 ft)
- Transmitter coordinates: 45°31′21″N 122°44′45″W

Links
- Public license information: Public file; LMS
- Webcast: Listen Live; Direct stream access (AAC); Listen Live (HD2)
- Website: k103.iheart.com

KKCW (103.3 FM, "K103") is a commercial radio station licensed to Beaverton, Oregon and serving the Portland metropolitan area. It is owned by iHeartMedia and airs an adult contemporary radio format. From mid-November to December 31 each year, it switches to all-Christmas music. The studios and offices are on SW 68th Parkway in Tigard, while the transmitter is located off Northwest Skyline Boulevard in Portland's West Hills, amid the towers for other local FM and TV stations. KKCW broadcasts in the HD Radio hybrid format.

== History ==
In 1984, the Columbia-Willamette Broadcasting Company acquired and built out the license for a new FM station for Portland licensed to Beaverton. It intended to sign on the station with a country music format, and the "CW" in the station's calls would have held a dual meaning for 'country and western' had it gone to plan.

KUPL-FM (98.5), which had been an easy listening station on FM, instead had the country format airing on sister station 1330 AM KUPL bumped to 98.5 on February 24, 1984. Thus, KKCW "K103" instead went on the air with a soft adult contemporary format and de facto traded formats with KUPL-FM. KKCW has never changed its format since sign-on, outside adjustments to fit industry trends.

In 1986, the station was sold to Trumper Communications of Portland. San Antonio-based Clear Channel acquired the station in 1999.

== HD programming ==
The station currently carries 1 HD Radio subchannel besides the HD1 simulcast, though it has had two subchannels in the past.

=== KKCW-HD2 ===
From August 2007 until 2019, an automated smooth jazz format with a resemblance to that of KIJZ, which switched to oldies after that point, was programmed. It eventually took the automated playlist heard on the iHeartRadio web/app Smooth Jazz channel until its demise. In January 2024, the HD2 signal was reactivated with a Latin pop/AC format known as "Magic".

=== KKCW-HD3 ===
The channel carried the Educational Media Foundation's Air1 Christian worship music network, which was also relayed on FM translator K224DL (92.7 FM), until November 2019. Air1 then moved to KLVP-HD2 after that station was moved into the Portland market, which is translated by K235CU (94.9).
