= KIJZ =

KIJZ may refer to:

- KIJZ-LP, a defunct low-power radio station (102.9 FM) licensed to serve Austin, Texas, United States
- KFBW, a radio station (105.9 FM) licensed to serve Vancouver, Washington, United States, which held the call sign KIJZ from 2005 to 2007
