= KLOL =

- Houston, Texas; United States
- Broadcast area: Greater Houston
- Frequency: 101.1 MHz (HD Radio)
- Branding: Mega 101

Programming
- Language: Spanish
- Format: Contemporary hit radio
- Subchannels: HD2: Tejano music ("Fierro")
- Affiliations: Houston Texans; KTMD

Ownership
- Owner: Audacy, Inc.; (Audacy License, LLC)
- Sister stations: KHMX; KIKK; KILT; KILT-FM; KIKK-FM

History
- First air date: June 30, 1947
- Former call signs: KTRH-FM (1947–1970)
- Call sign meaning: LOL in lower case resembles "101"

Technical information
- Licensing authority: FCC
- Facility ID: 35073
- Class: C
- ERP: 96,000 watts; (100,000 watts with beam tilt)
- HAAT: 585 meters (1,919 ft)
- Transmitter coordinates: 29°34′34″N 95°30′38″W

Links
- Public license information: Public file; LMS
- Webcast: Listen live (via Audacy); HD2: Listen live (via Audacy)
- Website: www.audacy.com/klol

KLOL (101.1 MHz, "Mega 101") is a commercial FM radio station in Houston, Texas. It is owned by Audacy, Inc. and airs a Spanish-language Latin pop format. KLOL serves as the Spanish-language flagship station for the Houston Texans football team.

The studios and offices are in Greenway Plaza in Houston. The transmitter is located off McHard Road in Missouri City, Texas.

== History ==
=== KTRH-FM ===
For much of the early days of radio, KTRH had been one of Houston's top AM stations, co-owned with The Houston Chronicle. In 1945, a construction permit for an FM station was obtained, and on June 30, 1947, 101.1 KTRH-FM went on the air. It was the third FM station in Houston (after the short-lived KOPY and KPRC-FM) and mostly simulcast KTRH's programming when few people had FM radios. KTRH-AM-FM aired the CBS Radio Network line-up of dramas, comedies, news, sports, soap operas, game shows and big band broadcasts during the "Golden Age of Radio".

In the 1950s, as network programming moved from radio to TV, KTRH-AM-FM switched to a full-service middle of the road (MOR) format. On September 1965, KTRH-AM-FM were acquired by the Rusk Corporation. Under Rusk ownership, KTRH-FM experimented with progressive rock programs at night while simulcasting AM 740 in the daytime.

=== Rock 101 KLOL ===
On August 7, 1970, "I'm Free" by The Who ushered in a new format and call sign to the 101.1 frequency, and "The KLOL Legend" was born. In the early days, KLOL was known as "Mother's Family" and later "K101" and utilized what would be termed a freeform radio format, where each DJ would choose which records he wanted to play. The "Mother's Family" name was a reference to KFMK-FM (97.9, now KBXX), Houston's original progressive rock radio station, known as "Mother Radio".

A major contributor to the early and ongoing success of KLOL was the late laid-back DJ Maurice "Crash" Collins. KLOL played cuts from mostly rock albums in the early years, but it was also possible to hear jazz, blues, folk music and R&B. In the mid-1970s the main rock competition to 101 KLOL was ABC-owned 96.5 KAUM. KAUM eventually switched to Top 40 hits. In addition, 100.3 KILT-FM was another competitor for KLOL also playing rock music,

=== Moving to AOR ===
By the late 1970s, KLOL had moved from progressive rock to an album-oriented rock sound, with a structured playlist of only the top tracks from the best selling albums. The station changed its moniker to "101 KLOL". KLOL achieved victory in early 1981 against format rival KILT-FM, which soon changed its format to country music. Shortly thereafter, KLOL had another rival in 97ROCK (96.5 KSRR) and one of the fiercest AOR battles of the 1980s commenced. KLOL once again won the battle as KSRR flipped to Top 40 as KKHT in 1986 (and is now KHMX).

KLOL mellowed somewhat in the 1980s, as did many AORs, but the playlist remained quite wide. The station's core artists were The Eagles, Bruce Springsteen, Fleetwood Mac, Van Halen, The Rolling Stones, Billy Joel, Led Zeppelin, Boston, The Police and Tom Petty.

In the late 1980s and early 1990s, KLOL was one of the top-rated AOR stations in the United States. KLOL featured legendary morning hosts Mark Stevens and Jim Pruett and their cleverly titled "Stevens and Pruett Show", chalking up both high ratings and several fines from the Federal Communications Commission (FCC) for "offensive content". Dayna Steele anchored mid-days with her audience of "Steele Workers". In the evenings it was "Outlaw Radio", an active rock show with "a lot of attitude". KLOL was regularly in the top 3 in that time frame.

=== Changes in ownership ===
In 1993, Evergreen Media bought KTRH and KLOL for $49 million. Evergreen started to make changes to KLOL's sound. The station started relying heavily on either classic rock product (KLOL would be almost all classic rock from 1996 to 1998) or current product from "safe artists" who were often not that popular. KLOL virtually ignored the exploding grunge rock and alternative rock bands in the 1990s.

In late 1998, KLOL began playing more current material. Some thought active rock was finally coming to Houston on KLOL. Alternative rock-formatted KTBZ-FM had moved to a more pop-alternative sound to target listeners who had previously tuned in the now defunct 102.9 KKPN, a modern AC station that is now KLTN. So the opportunity for a harder-edged station was there. But the station stopped short of going to an active rock sound.

Clear Channel Communications became the owner of KLOL in 2000. For several years, Clear Channel retained the rock format. Many thought Clear Channel would bring back the classic sound of the station during the previous decades. Instead, KLOL carried on in the same vein for another four years.

=== KLOL transition to Latin ===
Rumors of a KLOL format change had been heard since at least 1989. Some had speculated on a switch to urban oldies or Top 40 as "KISS 101". However, the November 10, 2004, edition of "the Walton & Johnson Show" on KLOL informed listeners that if they wanted to keep listening, they had better learn Spanish.

On November 12, 2004, after a rerun of the "Walton & Johnson Show", KLOL segued into the "10 O'Clock Rock Block" as normal. Then, at 10:11 am, the station changed its format to Hurban (Spanish-language hip hop music). "I'm Free" by The Who would bookend the 34-year history of KLOL as a rock station.

In the fall of 2007, KLOL redesigned the station's entire look, changing the format to a more contemporary Latin pop sound under the direction of Clear Channel's Senior VP Alfredo Alonso. This design was made to better compete with other Spanish-language stations on the Houston radio dial. The name MEGA 101 was kept, while the logo was changed. The website was also redesigned. Dayna Steele began to learn Spanish while she prepared for a career in politics.

=== CBS and Entercom acquisitions ===
On December 15, 2008, Clear Channel and CBS Radio announced a multi-station swap: KLOL and co-owned 96.5 KHMX would go to CBS Radio, while CBS Radio-owned stations WQSR in Baltimore, KBKS-FM in Seattle, KLTH and KXJM in Portland, Oregon, and KQJK in Sacramento, California, would go to Clear Channel. The sale was approved on March 31, 2009, and was consummated on April 1.

On February 2, 2017, CBS Radio announced it would merge with Entercom. The merger was approved on November 9, and was consummated on November 17.

=== Partnership with KTMD ===
On September 25, 2018, Entercom struck a new content deal with NBCUniversal Television Group station KTMD (Telemundo Channel 47). The TV station would provide news, weather and other content for KLOL programming.

=== Online return of Rock 101 ===
On November 12, 2012, after eight years of absence, Rock 101 KLOL returned as an Internet radio format. The online-only version plays classic, progressive and some contemporary rock as well as blues-rock, often commercial-free. The Internet station is run by volunteers and uses a listener-supported business model. It is not owned by Audacy.

The station has several syndicated shows as well as original programming. Classic station imaging is played and old clips of Stevens & Pruett's "Uncle Waldo" are aired on Friday mornings. Former "on air" personalities such as the late Jim Pruett, Dayna Steele and Scotty Phillips have contributed with sweepers and station drops, along with other material.

== Current competitors ==
- KAMA-FM 104.9 Latino Mix
- KOVE-FM Amor 106.5

== Callsign and moniker history ==
- KTRH-FM: June 30, 1947
- KLOL: August 1970 (Mother's Family, K101, 101 KLOL, Classic Rock 101 KLOL, Rock 101 KLOL, Rock 101, Mega 101 Latino & Proud!, Mega 101FM, Mega 101)
