= KHMX =

Hot adult contemporary radio station in Houston

- Houston, Texas; United States
- Broadcast area: Greater Houston
- Frequency: 96.5 MHz (HD Radio)
- Branding: Mix 96.5

Programming
- Language: English
- Format: Hot adult contemporary
- Subchannels: HD2: Channel Q

Ownership
- Owner: Audacy, Inc.; (Audacy License, LLC)
- Sister stations: KIKK; KILT; KILT-FM; KIKK-FM; KLOL

History
- First air date: February 1, 1948
- Former call signs: KXYZ-FM (1948–1970); KAUM (1970–1980); KSRR (1980–1986); KKHT (1986–1989); KNRJ (1989–1990)
- Call sign meaning: "Houston's Mix"

Technical information
- Licensing authority: FCC
- Facility ID: 47749
- Class: C
- ERP: 100,000 watts
- HAAT: 585 meters (1,919 ft)
- Transmitter coordinates: 29°34′34″N 95°30′36″W

Links
- Public license information: Public file; LMS
- Webcast: Listen live (via Audacy)
- Website: audacy.com/mix965houston

KHMX (96.5 FM, "Mix 96.5") is a commercial radio station licensed to Houston, Texas, United States, and serving Greater Houston. Owned by Audacy, Inc., it features a hot adult contemporary format with studios located in Houston's Greenway Plaza district and transmitter sited in the Houston suburb of Missouri City. In addition to a standard analog transmission, KHMX broadcasts in HD Radio and is available online via Audacy. It is the flagship station for the syndicated morning show "The Dana Cortez Show".

== History ==
=== Early years ===
KXYZ-FM first signed on February 1, 1948, under the ownership of Shamrock Broadcasting. As typical of FM radio stations in the mid-20th century, KXYZ-FM was a simulcast of its AM parent, KXYZ. On April 6, 1953, the station expanded its broadcasts to 12 hours. The station would stay on the air for five years and six months before being silent on September 10, 1953, resuming operations on October 4, 1961, again as a simulcast of KXYZ's beautiful music format.

In 1968, KXYZ and KXYZ-FM were acquired by ABC; the new ownership subsequently changed KXYZ-FM's format to automated progressive rock, branded as "Love 96 1/2 FM" in September 1969. "Love" was formulated by ABC Radio for its FM stations around the U.S., including WABC-FM in New York City, KABC-FM in Los Angeles, WLS-FM in Chicago, KGO-FM in San Francisco, WXYZ-FM in Detroit and KQV-FM in Pittsburgh. At the end of 1970, all seven FM stations switched call signs to distinguish from their AM counterparts. KXYZ-FM became KAUM on December 13, 1970, a nod to the Hindu chant of "Om" or "Aum". When the national "Love" format was discontinued later in 1971, the progressive rock music continued, but with local disc jockeys, changing its moniker to "KAUM 96 1/2 FM". In 1979, KAUM shifted from album-oriented rock (AOR) to Top 40 hits to compete against KRBE and KILT.

On July 24, 1980, the station flipped to KSRR. Branded as "Star 97", it had an adult contemporary format with a fair amount of country crossover material. The format did not get much traction, and after KILT-FM flipped from rock to country in February 1981, it opened up an opportunity for the station. On September 7, 1981, "Star 97" flipped to album rock as "97 Rock." It also used the slogan "Kick Ass Rock 'N' Roll!" and a logo similar to WABB in Mobile. The new station featured morning radio host and KEGL Dallas alum James Smith "Moby" Carney and Matthew, with Hannah Storm as sports announcer.

In mid-1985, due to the merger of ABC Radio and Capital Cities Communications, KSRR was spun off to Malrite Communications in order to meet the FCC's ownership limits at the time. On October 15, 1986, the station changed call letters to KKHT, and the AOR format was replaced by a Top 40 format known as "Hit 96.5 KKHT". By mid-1987, heavy competition from Top 40 powerhouses KKBQ-FM and KRBE prompted the station to morph to adult contemporary. The station rebranded as "96.5 KKHT". In late 1988, Emmis Broadcasting bought the station.

On February 10, 1989, at 6 p.m., the station flipped to a new rhythmic contemporary format, with a focus on dance-oriented music, branded as "Energy 96.5". The station adopted the new KNRJ call letters (a nod to French radio station NRJ) on September 4. This format was a competitive response to two other local stations, KKBQ and KRBE, whose Top 40 formats reflected the increasing presence of dance club-oriented tracks (catering to a then-lucrative target audience drawn to the flourishing night club scenes along Richmond Avenue and inner Westheimer Road). These competitors featured late-night, weekend live broadcasts from local dance clubs (e.g., Club 6400, The Ocean Club), where in-house DJs drew heavily from libraries of imported and small-label, extended-length modern tracks (which otherwise were seldom heard on most commercial stations). By early 1990, KNRJ had partnered with the Tower Theater's Decadance to host its own weekend, late-night live broadcast.

In May 1990, Nationwide Communications bought the station. The station's ratings during this time were low and the new owners wanted to improve the numbers. In the station's latter months, KNRJ began adding more new wave music tracks to improve ratings.

=== Mix 96.5 ===
On June 25, 1990, at 7:15 a.m., in the middle of "Tonight" by New Kids on the Block, DJ Jeff Scott, in a bit, abruptly cut off the song and announced his discontent for the format, with he and some fellow DJs playing brief music clips to complain about before being heard throwing the tapes away. After that, KNRJ flipped to an alternative rock format. The station kicked off with "I Eat Cannibals" by Toto Coelo, starting off a "Top 100 Best Alternative Songs of All Time" countdown. The Alternative 96.5 re-brand was a transitional format, lasting roughly five weeks, and was promoted while a forthcoming format was under preparation. A weekly playlist, under a makeshift Alternative 96.5 letterhead, was distributed to local retail and media outlets.

Then, at 7 a.m. on July 18, KNRJ began stunting with a 48-hour ticking clock countdown sequence. A series of disjointed song samples were eventually interspersed into the sequence within the last 12 hours, most famously the opening to the song "Let It Whip" by The Dazz Band played first normally, then again in reverse. After the countdown concluded at 7 a.m. on July 20, a fictitious "teacher" conducted a "roll call" calling out the names of program directors from competing radio stations, asking the "class" to start their tape recorders and take notes as this "lecture" was to begin. At that moment, KNRJ's call letters switched to KHMX as the station changed formats to hot adult contemporary, branded as "Mix 96.5." The first two songs on "Mix" were Steve Winwood's "Roll With It" and Taylor Dayne's "I'll Be Your Shelter".

Previous logo under Clear Channel ownership

General Manager Clancy Woods and Nationwide National Program Director Guy Zapoleon used the roll out at KHMX to launch other new Hot AC stations, branded as the "Mix" format. The Mix brand tagline, "More Music, More Variety, A Better Mix", was commercially successful. The formula for the "Mix" format was replicated through the 1990s and early 2000s in several other radio markets across North America and in cities as far away as Sydney, Australia by KHMX consultant Alan Burns. Around the same time, research expert John Parikhal, who also worked with KHMX, was helping PD Greg Strassell of Steve Dodge's American Radio Systems in Boston launch another Mix station known as "Mix 98.5", WBMX. WBMX was more of a Rhythmic AC and an early example of today's MOViN' format. Another Mix station was launched a few months earlier in the Summer of 1989 at WOMX in Orlando by Nationwide Communications GM Rick Weinkoff and PD Brian Thomas, with help from Guy Zapoleon.

Nationwide sold all of its radio stations, including KHMX, to Jacor in October 1997. After a series of mergers, Clear Channel Communications acquired KHMX in early 1999. KHMX was broadcast nationwide on XM Satellite Radio from 2001 to the end of 2003, when a unique-to-XM Mix channel debuted.

On December 15, 2008, Clear Channel and CBS Radio announced a multi-station swap: KHMX and sister station KLOL would go to CBS Radio, while CBS Radio-owned stations WQSR in Baltimore, KBKS in Seattle, KLTH and KXJM in Portland, Oregon and KQJK in Sacramento would go to Clear Channel. The sale was approved on March 31, 2009, and was consummated on April 1. After the sale of the station to CBS in 2009, KHMX tweaked its sound to include more Top 40/CHR currents.

On February 2, 2017, CBS Radio announced it would merge with Entercom. The merger was approved on November 9, 2017, and was consummated on November 17.

=== Morning shows ===
During its tenure as "Mix", the station has rotated through several morning shows, including Roula & Ryan (now on KRBE) from 2003-2005, Sam Malone (formerly of KRBE) from 2005-2007, Maria Todd (also formerly of KRBE) from 2009-2011, The Kidd Kraddick Morning Show from 2011-2012, Atom Smasher (also a KRBE alum) from 2013-2015, and Dave, Mahoney & DK (formerly of sister KXTE/Las Vegas) from 2015-2016.

Dave, Mahoney & DK were let go from the station in December 2016. On April 5, 2017, it was announced that "The Morning Mix" would become the new morning show on KHMX, consisting of former KKHH host Sarah Pepper, along with afternoon host Lauren Kelly and Geoff Sheen, formerly of KTKR in San Antonio, which began on April 10, 2017. Lauren Kelly, however, left the station in 2019. Pepper left the station in 2024. Since November 4, 2024, the station has been the flagship for the syndicated "Dana Cortez Show". Cortez and her co-hosts also relocated from their previous home base in Phoenix to Houston in January 2025.

== HD radio ==
KHMX signed on HD Radio operations in 2006. 96.5 HD2 first carried a rhythmic contemporary – dance music format, known as "Energy 96.5." Energy 96.5 was the moniker KHMX used prior to becoming "Mix" in 1990. After the sale of the station to CBS in April 2009, KHMX 96.5 HD2 and KKHH 95.7 HD2 swapped formats, with KHMX-HD2 becoming smooth jazz "The Wave", while KKHH-HD2 taking on the dance format and "Energy 95.7" moniker. "The Wave" would eventually evolve into a Smooth AC (a hybrid of Smooth Jazz and R&B music) format with an emphasis on Smooth Jazz.

In December 2016, "The Wave" moved to KHMX-HD3. After a brief run with an album adult alternative (AAA) format as "Third Rock Radio", and nearly a year of airing a message redirecting Smooth Jazz listeners to KHMX HD-3, the HD-2 re-launched as Hard rock-formatted "HarD Rock Radio 96-5 HD-2" on November 20, 2017.

The HD subchannels would be turned off in February 2023. In August 2026, KHMX-HD2 was reactivated as the Houston affiliate for "Channel Q", which moved over from KKHH-HD2.
