= KPOJ =

- Portland, Oregon; United States
- Broadcast area: Portland metropolitan area
- Frequency: 620 kHz
- Branding: Rip City Radio 620

Programming
- Format: Sports
- Affiliations: Fox Sports Radio; Portland Trail Blazers Radio Network; KATU-TV (news partnership)

Ownership
- Owner: iHeartMedia, Inc.; (iHM Licenses, LLC)
- Sister stations: KEX; KKRZ; KKCW; KFBW; KLTH; KXJM

History
- First air date: March 25, 1922
- Former call signs: KGW (1922–1993); KINK (1993–1995); KOTK (1995–1997); KEWS (1997–2000); KDBZ (2000–2002); KTLK (2002–2003)
- Former frequencies: 833 kHz (1922); 750 kHz (1922–1923); 750 (entertainment) and 619 kHz (weather) (1923); 610 kHz (1923–1928)
- Call sign meaning: The Portland Oregon Journal (former calls of KKPZ from 1948–1970)

Technical information
- Licensing authority: FCC
- Facility ID: 53069
- Class: B
- Power: 25,000 watts (days); 10,000 watts (nights)
- Transmitter coordinates: 45°25′19.4″N 122°34′1.3″W

Links
- Public license information: Public file; LMS
- Webcast: Listen live (via iHeartRadio)
- Website: ripcityradio.iheart.com

KPOJ (620 AM, "Rip City Sports Radio 620") is a commercial radio station licensed to Portland, Oregon, United States. Owned by iHeartMedia, it airs a sports radio format as the local affiliate for Fox Sports Radio and the flagship station for the Portland Trail Blazers Radio Network. The KPOJ studios are on SW 68th Parkway in Tigard.

KPOJ 's transmitter site is off SE Lawnfield Road, near Interstate 205 in Sunnyside, Oregon.

== History ==
=== KGW ===
On December 1, 1921, the U.S. Department of Commerce, in charge of radio at the time, adopted a regulation formally establishing a broadcasting station category. It set aside the wavelength of 360 meters (833 kHz) for entertainment broadcasts, and 485 meters (619 kHz) for market and weather reports. On March 21, 1922, the Oregonian Publishing Company, which owned The Oregonian daily newspaper, was issued a license for a new Portland station. It had the randomly assigned call letters KGW, transmitting on the 360 meter entertainment wavelength.

Following a series of test transmissions, KGW began regular broadcasting at noon on March 25, 1922. The debut program included singing by Chicago Grand Opera soprano Edith Mason. The station's studios and transmitter were located in the Oregonian Building. The studios remained there until 1943, when a fire destroyed the facility. At that point, the station moved to other quarters.

In late September 1922, the Department of Commerce set aside a second entertainment wavelength, 400 meters (750 kHz) for "Class B" stations that had quality equipment and programming, and KGW was assigned use of this more exclusive wavelength. In early 1923 the station received an additional authorization to broadcast weather reports on 485 meters.

In May 1923, additional "Class B" frequencies were made available, which included a Portland allocation for 610 kHz (492 meters). KGW was exclusively assigned to this frequency. On November 11, 1928, as part of the implementation of a major nationwide reallocation under the provisions of the Federal Radio Commission's General Order 40, KGW was assigned to a "regional" frequency, 620 kHz.

=== NBC Red Network ===
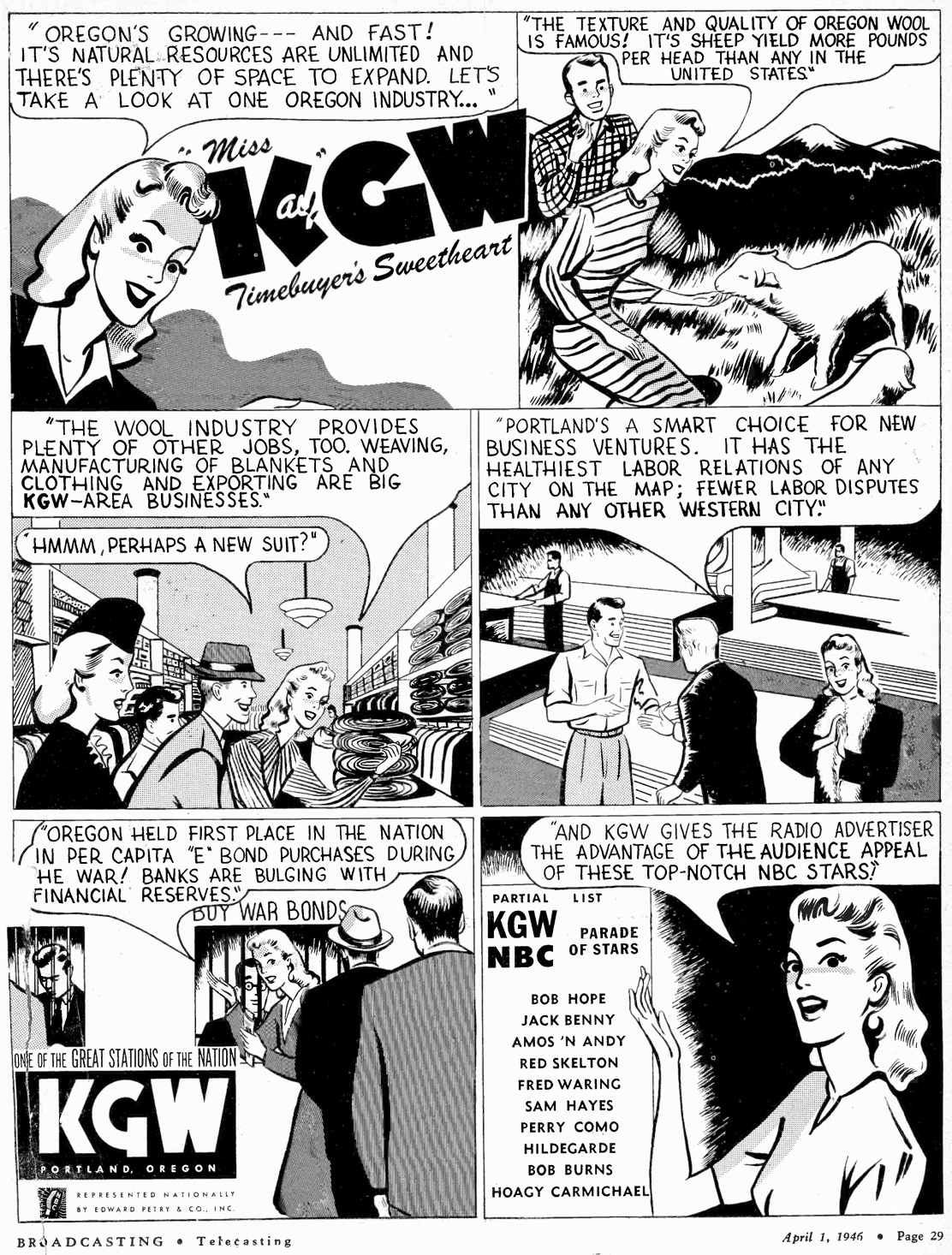
1946 station advertisement, narrated by "Miss KayGW".

KGW affiliated with the NBC Red Network in 1927. It carried NBC's dramas, comedies, news and sports during the "Golden Age of Radio". At the time, KGW was powered at only 1,000 watts, a fraction of its current output. KGW remained an NBC Network affiliate for 29 years until joining ABC Radio in 1956.

Among KGW's early personalities was Mel Blanc, a local musician and vocalist featured on the "Hoot Owls" variety program. Hoot Owls ran from 1927 to 1933. Here, Blanc discovered a talent for character voices that would win him stardom as the voice of Bugs Bunny, Daffy Duck and many other Warner Brothers cartoon features.

=== TV and FM ===
Under the ownership of The Oregonian, the station gained a sister station, KEX, in 1933. It put the Northwest's first FM station, KGW-FM on the air in 1946. KGW-FM mostly simulcast 620 AM in its early years, when few people owned FM receivers. In 1954, it was sold, becoming easy listening KQFM. Today it is 100.3 KKRZ.

In 1957, KGW was sold to the Seattle-based King Broadcasting Company. King Broadcasting founded KGW-TV in 1956. KGW-TV channel 8 is now owned by Tegna, Inc.

=== Top 40, AC and talk ===
As network programming moved from radio to television, AM stations began airing music formats. KGW flipped to Top 40 hits on January 9, 1959. "62 KGW", as it called itself during the 1960s and 1970s, was one of the most popular radio stations in Portland among young people. For many years and with various formats, the station also called itself "Super 62".

In the 1980s, as younger listeners tuned to FM radio for their favorite songs, KGW's ratings declined. That prompted a shift to a full service, adult contemporary music format.

The AC format also struggled in the ratings. On July 28, 1989, the station changed to a talk format, using primarily local hosts. The change did not produce the hoped-for ratings turnaround. On July 26, 1991, the talk programming was replaced by a simulcast of the adult album alternative (AAA) programming of sister station KINK-FM. AM 620 retained the longstanding and locally well-known call sign KGW at first. On March 1, 1993, the call letters were changed to KINK.

=== Syndicated talk ===
On February 6, 1995, KINK changed back to all-talk, now airing nationally syndicated talk hosts instead of local talk. The call letters changed to KOTK, representing "Oregon's Talk". The frequent changing of call letters continued, with the station becoming KEWS ("K-News") in 1997, KDBZ ("The Buzz") in 2000, and KTLK ("K-Talk") in 2002.

On July 25, 2003, the station flipped to oldies. It began the call letters KPOJ on August 18. They refer to the Portland Oregon Journal newspaper, which once held the call sign for its AM station on 1330.

=== Progressive talk ===
Logo as a progressive talk station

On March 31, 2004, KPOJ flipped to progressive talk, with hosts who advocated liberal politics. The station was one of the first Air America affiliates, joining when the network launched in that same month. KPOJ ran most of Air America's shows.

Hosts included Marc Maron, Rachel Maddow, Al Franken, Randi Rhodes, Janeane Garofalo, Sam Seder and Mike Malloy. It also served as broadcast home for Thom Hartmann with Carl Wolfson and Christine Alexander doing a locally focused morning show for a time.

=== Sports talk ===
At 5:30 PM on November 9, 2012, the progressive talk format was replaced by all-sports. This happened three days after the 2012 general election.

Fans of the progressive talk radio format immediately started a campaign to "Save KPOJ", with thousands of listeners signing a petition to the station's owner, Clear Channel Communications. Clear Channel changed its name in 2014 to iHeartMedia, Inc.

In 2013, KPOJ became the flagship station of the Portland Trail Blazers basketball team, replacing sister station KEX. The station had already aired some Blazers games during the 2012–13 season when there were conflicts with KEX's broadcasts of the Oregon State Beavers. On April 14, 2014, KPOJ rebranded as "Rip City Radio 620." (Rip City is a nickname for Portland, inspired by the Blazers.)

=== Fox Sports Radio ===
The station is a long-time Fox Sports Radio affiliate. It has carried many Fox Sports hosts, including Rich Eisen, Jay Mohr and Clay Travis. In March 2015, a local morning drive time show was added, "Rip City Mornings" with Andy Bunker and Taylor Danforth.

Travis Demers was brought in to host the afternoon drive show "The Rip City Drive" in October 2015. Dan Sheldon and Nigel Burton took over hosting the morning show on September 1, 2016. Chad Doing was added to the afternoon show on March 20, 2017.

=== Partnership with NBC Sports Northwest ===
On January 14, 2018, Rip City Radio announced a partnership with NBC Sports Northwest. The lineup included a television simulcast of Rip City Mornings with Dan Sheldon and Nigel Burton, and the Rip City Drive with Travis Demers and Chad Doing in the afternoon. A new midday show with Dwight Jaynes and Aaron Fentress was added. In July 2018, the Brian Noe Show replaced Dwight and Aaron.

The partnership also included adding a radio simulcast to shows originated by NBC Sports Northwest including 'Talkin Beavers', 'Talkin Ducks', 'The Bridge', and 'Outdoor GPS'.

== See also ==
- List of initial AM-band station grants in the United States
