= Mark Mason (announcer) =

American sports announcer

- Born: November 10; Glendale, California
- Presenting career
- Show: Mark Mason Show
- Station: KEX
- Time slot: 12:00p-3:00p
- Style: News-talk
- Country: United States
- Website: www.markanddaveshow.com

Mark Mason is an American public address announcer for the Portland Trail Blazers of the National Basketball Association.

Mason began working as the Trail Blazers' public address announcer at the start of the 1996–97 NBA season. Since his start, he has announced every preseason and regular season game and reached 843 consecutive regular season games before a health crisis ended the streak in April, 2016. In October, 2016, after a six-month recovery he resumed his spot courtside to begin the 2016-2017 NBA season. He will begin his 30th season behind the mic with the opening of the NBA Trailblazers 2025-2026 season.

A native of Southern California, Mason's radio broadcast career path took him to Portland, Oregon in 1995 where he hosted the "Mark Mason Show", a local news–talk show. The show aired afternoons on KEX 1190 in Portland for almost 30-years.

Mason is known for including "native-language introductions" for the team's foreign players, a "6th Man" catch-phrase, and the anticipatory "Are you ready...for your Portland Trail Blazers!" According to Mason, his introduction of current Trail Blazers guard Damian Lillard is the first introduction of an NBA player by letter rather than number. (O, for Lillard's regional basketball resume: Oakland, Ogden, and Oregon.)
