= The Playhouse (radio show) =

American radio program

- Genre: Comedy, Talk
- Running time: 5 hours (inc. commercials); 4 hours online (live and repeat)
- Country of origin: United States
- Home station: KXJM (107.5) (May 12, 2008-December 1, 2009)
- Starring: P.K.; Duryan; Neveen (in absentia); Ivan; "Extra Work" Tony
- Produced by: Ivan
- Original release: 2000 (first on KXJM "Jammin'" 95.5; now KXTG)
- Website: playhouseshow.com

Playhouse TV Logo

The Playhouse was a Portland, Oregon-based syndicated morning drive time radio show that debuted on February 12, 2000. It originally aired weekday mornings between 5-10am on then-flagship radio station KXJM (Jammin 107.5 FM), with the last four hours of the show being broadcast live online with fully produced video, and repeated every four hours until the next show. The show was also on at various hours in the morning on its syndicated affiliates. From its conception on February 12, 2000 to May 12, 2008 the show's flagship station was the "Original" Jammin' 95.5 KXJM (now KXTG).

The Playhouse also had a nightly TV show called Playhouse TV that aired on Comcast's on-demand service in the Portland and Eugene areas. The show was aired nightly on Comcast in the Portland and Eugene metropolitan areas on channel 14 until the service was discontinued.

The Playhouse was canceled by KXJM on December 1, 2009. It was unclear what led to their departure from KXJM. It was announced via Ivan's Twitter account on December 2, 2009, that they would be returning to "a new PDX home" in early 2010; however, P.K. and Ivan instead moved to Houston, Texas to host a morning show on KKHH "Hot 95-7".

== Cast ==
- P.K.
- Ivan
- Duryan
- Extra Work Tony-Produces PlayHouse TV
- Denise-PK's wife & phone screener

== Former cast members ==
- Neveen (in absentia)
- Sonie
- Scooter
- Felix
- FPC aka Fat Phone Chick (Heather)
- E-bro
- Manny
- Don-E
- JB
- Seahorse
- Jailbait aka Lori
- Asian Boy (Shanno)

== Former affiliates ==
The PlayHouse went into syndication in 2003. Gradually, over the years, their affiliates dropped the show due to format changes or looking for a local morning show.

- KXJM-Portland, Oregon (home station), "Jammin 95.5" (later 107.5)
- KSEQ-Fresno, California (the last remaining affiliate before the show officially went on hiatus/cancellation in December 2009), "Q97"
- KEZE-Spokane, Washington, "Wired 96.9"
- KBTE-Lubbock, Texas, "104.9 The Beat"
- KKYD (now KMXN)-Topeka, Kansas, "Wild 92.9"
- KSRT-Santa Rosa, California, "Jammin 107.1"
- KSXY-Santa Rosa, California, "Hot 98.7"
- KYZZ-Salinas/Monterey, California, "Jammin 97.9"
- KMME-Eugene, Oregon, "94.9 Jamz"
- WZNR (now WUSH)-Norfolk, Virginia, "The Zone @ 106.1"
- WRED-Portland, Maine, "Red Hot 95"
- KUJ-FM-Kennewick, Washington (Tri-Cities area), "Power 99.1"
- KAQX (now KLMY)-Astoria, Oregon, "Q94.3"
- KEWB-Redding, California, "Power 94"
- WKPO (now WWHG)-Madison, Wisconsin, "Hot 105.9" (first syndicated affiliate)
- KFAT-Anchorage, Alaska, "K-Fat 92.9"

== Incidents ==
=== The 'Special Jen' incident ===
On April 17, 2003, The Playhouse held a local event called "Adopt a Hottie," where P.K. would introduce groupies and have the listeners judge them. A frequent caller nicknamed "Special Jen", who appeared to be intellectually disabled, was invited on stage. P.K. then asked if it were true that she "had learned how to wipe herself." When someone else then asked "to see her ass," she pulled down her pants, according to an audience member. "All the while, the cast of The Playhouse jumped around, pointing, mugging at each other, slapping their foreheads, stomping their feet, et. cetera," said another witness. This all came after a similar event in February where another DJ broadcast a conversation with a woman suffering from schizophrenia saying she was "the ugliest, fattest lady I've ever seen in my life." Mental-health advocates then flooded the station with calls and persuaded a major advertiser to yank its ads. In response to the "Special Jen" incident, Program Manager Tim MacNamara issued orders that 'Jen' be kept off the air and out of any future Playhouse events.

=== The Portland biking incident ===
On July 13, 2006, Neveen told a story about a friend who had recently hit a cyclist with her car while driving downtown. She then mentioned that she had another cyclist punch her car hood, and cut her off in traffic. In response, host P.K. encouraged listeners to call in and tell more stories of cyclists who had been smashed by cars because the thought of it "really pumped him up." He went on to say how much he hated cyclists who didn't obey traffic laws and stated, "When I hear on TV that a cyclist has been hit and killed by a car I laugh, I think it's funny. If you are a cyclist you should know I exist, that I don't care about you. That I don't care about your life." Community group "Bike Portland" attempted to stage a protest in front of the KXJM studios, but were soon turned away by the program manager of the station, Tim McNamara. The studio's phone lines were flooded with various threats of harm, media attention, and protest. As a way to settle the controversy, show host P.K. decided to conduct a 'ride along' with a pair of local Portland bike enthusiasts to experience what biking in a busy city is like. He later went on the air and offered an official apology.

=== Attack on Jammin' 95.5 ===
On March 14, 2008, listener Andy Chung reversed his car into the ground floor lobby area of The Playhouse's partner station Jammin' 95.5, in retaliation to some action the show apparently took towards him. Whilst none of the show's presenters were aware of what had made the listener so riled, the show had received "incoherent e-mail" every six to ten months over a period of around six years containing death threats towards the group. KOIN news reported that Chung was seeking damages of one million dollars, with the promise of $10,000 for any listener who provided information to help his (still unknown) dispute. The show was told that Chung had previously visited a local army office, inquiring about where he could "purchase a machine gun".

Chung was hospitalized in a psychiatric ward after the incident, but on 16 September 2009 the show received a new handwritten letter sent from the institution, in which he re-detailed his wish to "sue for $6 billion" or a settlement of $100 million to "have a good time with." However, the letter also provided a clue as to the motive for the physical and written attacks; Chung wrote of a 'radio wife' that he had met at a 'radio school' many years ago, and subsequently lost contact with. He apparently knew that the lady listened to the show and phoned in to express his feelings on-air, only to be cut off by the host before he could do so. As a result, the show's team believe Chung blames them for this failed love. Despite all of the controversy and threat, P.K. expressed his willingness to make peace with Chung, saying "the possibility is there to be on his good side." There is no information yet on Chung's release date from the hospital.

== Cancellation on KXJM ==
On December 1, 2009 The Playhouse was canceled on its home station KXJM (Jammin 107.5 FM). At this time, it is unclear what the circumstances surrounding their departure were. Within hours of their disappearance from Jammin 107.5's website, a new website surfaced for the show. In the weeks prior to their cancellation, the station began to require that music be played every so often during each broadcast of the show, much to the frustration of the hosts. It is unknown if this was a factor in their departure from KXJM. The following day, December 2, 2009, it was announced via Ivan's Twitter and Facebook accounts that they will be returning to a "new PDX home" in early 2010, and was able to be heard on KSEQ in Fresno, CA. In February 2010, Ivan announced through his Facebook account that himself and PK will do mornings at KKHH in Houston, TX starting Monday, February 22 and named "The Hot Show". It is unclear if DuRyan and Tony will join them in Houston. Since moving to Houston, there has been no further news of a move back to Portland.
