= KIKK-FM =

Simulcasts KIKK, Houston
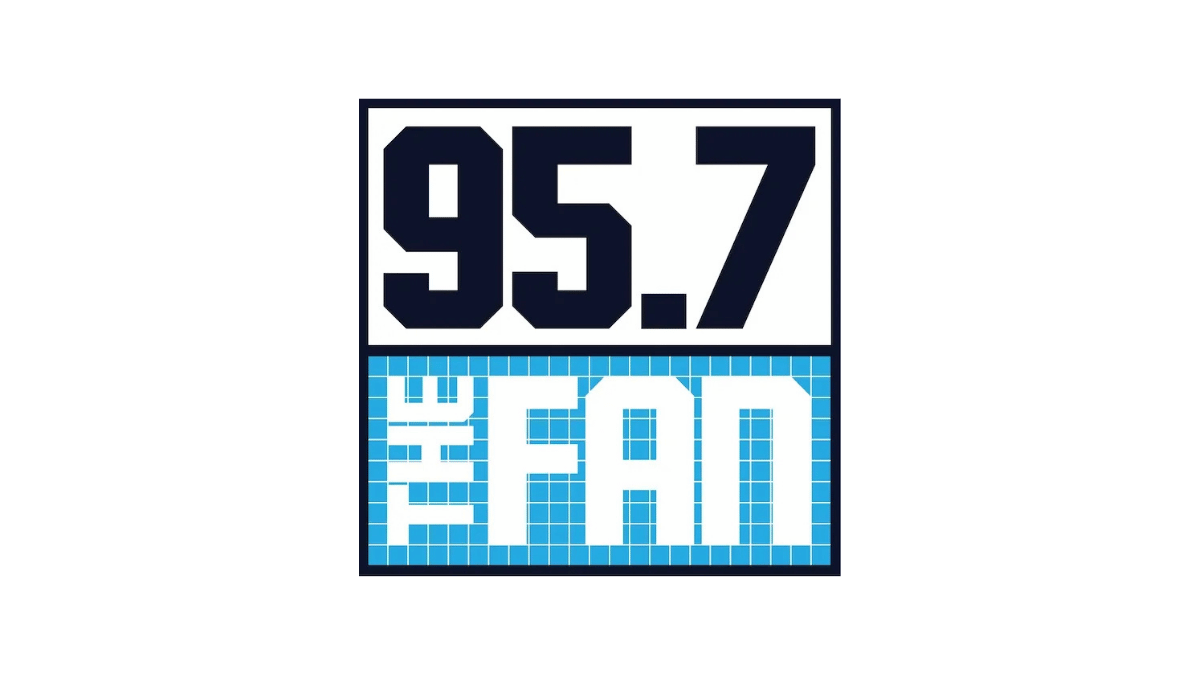
- Houston, Texas; United States
- Broadcast area: Greater Houston
- Frequency: 95.7 MHz (HD Radio)
- Branding: 95.7 The Fan

Programming
- Language: English
- Format: Sports talk radio
- Subchannels: HD2: Sports gambling (KILT); HD3: Adult hits “95.7 The Spot”
- Affiliations: Westwood One Sports; Houston Texans; Houston Dynamo; Sports USA Radio Network

Ownership
- Owner: Audacy, Inc.; (Audacy License, LLC)
- Sister stations: KHMX; KIKK; KILT; KILT-FM; KLOL

History
- First air date: October 4, 1959
- Former call signs: KHUL (1959–1966); KIKK-FM (1966–2002); KHJZ (2002–2007); KHJZ-FM (2007–2008); KKHH (2008–2026)
- Call sign meaning: "Kick"

Technical information
- Licensing authority: FCC
- Facility ID: 25449
- Class: C
- ERP: 100,000 watts
- HAAT: 585 meters (1,919 ft)
- Transmitter coordinates: 29°34′34″N 95°30′36″W

Links
- Public license information: Public file; LMS
- Webcast: Listen live (via Audacy); Listen live (HD3)
- Website: audacy.com/957thefan; HD3: audacy.com/957thespot

KIKK-FM (95.7 FM, "95.7 The Fan") is a radio station licensed to Houston, Texas, United States. It is owned by Audacy, Inc. and simulcasts a sports format with KIKK (610 AM), which originated the format in 1994 as KILT. The studios are located in the Greenway Plaza district of Houston and the transmitter is sited off Farm-to-Market Road 2234 near the Fort Bend Parkway in Southwest Houston. KIKK-FM broadcasts in HD Radio; the HD2 subchannel simulcasts KILT (AM)'s sports gambling format and the HD3 subchannel carries an adult hits format.

== Station history ==
=== Beginnings as "Cool" ===
KIKK-FM signed on the air as KHUL at 7 a.m. on October 4, 1959. KHUL carried a mostly instrumental easy listening and jazz format, and billed itself as "Cool, Refreshing Radio". KHUL was the first stand-alone FM station in the Houston radio market to operate with a 24-hour schedule and the 5th FM station in the area.

KHUL's effective radiated power was 15,500 watts, a fraction of its current output. It was owned by Charles Temple, president, and Ken Norman, vice president, which operated the station as Nor-Temp Broadcasting.

=== Country era ===
In 1966, the station was bought by Leroy J. Gloger, who owned Pasadena daytime-only AM country music station KIKK (650 AM). Gloger requested the station's call letters be changed to KIKK-FM, and began to simulcast the AM's country format as "KIKK 96 FM" (KIKK pronounced as "kick").

After album rock station KILT-FM flipped to country in 1981, the station saw fierce competition throughout the 1980s and early 1990s from the KILT combo. More competition came when KKBQ switched from easy country to a top 40 country approach in 1992. KIKK became KILT's sister station in late 1993, and KIKK struggled trying different variations on the format, including going from mainstream country to a more current-heavy approach in September 1994, then going head to head with KKBQ as "Young Country 95.7" by early 1997, and eventually rebranding as just "95.7 KIKK-FM" by September 2000. In 2001, KIKK adopted a Texas-centric country format, known as "Houston's Country Alternative," which included Americana and rock artists mixed in with more mainstream fare.

=== 95.7 The Wave ===
At Noon on November 4, 2002, KIKK-FM flipped from its long running country format to smooth jazz as "95.7 The Wave", with the KHJZ call letters being adopted on November 7.

=== Hot 95.7 ===
On March 12, 2008, at 5:37 p.m., KHJZ began stunting with a loop of "Don't Stop" by Freestyler and "Don't Stop the Music" by Rihanna, while promoting an announcement to come at 3 p.m. the next day. At that time, the station flipped to Top 40/CHR, branded as "Hot 95.7". The first song on "Hot" was the 2002 hit "Hot In Herre" by Nelly (by coincidence, a native of nearby Austin). The format used an interactive approach and positioned its Rhythmic hit-flavored direction in between KBXX and KRBE. At first, because of its choice of direction, Mediabase had placed KHJZ on its Rhythmic reporter panel, but moved it over to the Top 40/CHR panel as its playlist started playing non-Rhythmic fare. The KKHH call letters were adopted on April 1, 2008.

In an interview from the online website All Access (on the day of the flip), GM Laura Morris said, "We've built HOT 95-7 for the listener. We don't pick the hits; They do. Every hour, listeners can vote for the top hit of that hour and we'll play a song at the top of the next hour. We'll do that 24 hours a day... it's the first and only station we know of making listeners feel like they have that kind of control."

KKHH OM/PD Jeff Garrison, who also programmed Country sister KILT-FM and Sports Talk KILT (AM), added, "Houston's always been about making history ... from the oil wildcatters and the 8th Wonder of the World to landing on the moon. HOT 95-7 is Houston's next generation of radio, blazing a big, bold hot radio station for Houston listeners. HOT 95-7 has multi-cultural pop appeal with a rhythmic spice to match Houston's diversity. We're about today's new music, celebrity artists, pop culture, lifestyle and trends ... whatever is HOT now. We're online, on demand and in touch with the pulse of the next generation of pre-teen radio listeners."

On June 27, 2008, CBS announced the addition of Brad Booker and Sarah Pepper as the station's new morning show hosts beginning July 21. "We're very excited to have Booker & Sarah join the Hot team," said Hot/Houston PD Mark Adams. "I feel they're two of the most passionate, fun and entertaining morning show personalities out there, and I'm confident they'll do a great job here in Houston."

On February 22, 2010, PK Kalentzis and Ivan Trujillo (from the syndicated Playhouse morning show in Portland, Oregon) joined KKHH as the new morning show hosts, with Sarah Pepper remaining. Her former co-host, Brad Booker, moved over to sister station KHMX to join Maria Todd; Booker would later be released in 2011 following Todd's move to afternoons and Kidd Kraddick taking over the morning slot. PK would be released from the station in January 2016, with Pepper and Trujillo remaining as morning show hosts.

==== "Brit 95.7" stunt ====
On March 26, 2009, the station started running format change promos by the Station Manager. Dave Morales put the Station Manager on-air (unknown to him) to ask why and what was going on. The station manager just passed the buck and blamed CBS management and could not provide further information. When he found out he was on-air, he slammed down the phone.

The "changeover" was supposed to take place at 6:00 a.m. on March 30, 2009. There were rumors that KKHH would flip to urban, similar to KBXX and the defunct KPTY; this was because there was an ad for Los Angeles sister station "AMP 97.1" listed on the bottom of the page. However, many calls to the management or e-mails to the management were bilingual, hinting that they were pursuing a Latino format. In addition, the Pussycat Dolls were scheduled to appear in studio on Monday, the day "the switch" would be taking place.

The entire "change" for March 30, 2009 was apparently a marketing ploy. The station "changed" to "BRIT 95.7" to coincide with Britney Spears/the Pussycat Dolls concert at the Toyota Center the same evening. The station played nothing but Britney Spears music, and some the Pussycat Dolls music all day. The station would revert to "Hot 95.7" at Midnight.

=== 95.7 The Spot ===
At 10:20 a.m. on December 30, 2016, after playing "Don't Wanna Know" by Maroon 5 featuring Kendrick Lamar, KKHH began stunting with a robotic voice counting down from 2,957 to 0; at the same time, a message appeared on the station's website, saying "We're making some changes to 95-7. Tune in at 12:30 PM to find out what." At that time, KKHH flipped to adult hits as "95.7 The Spot". The first (and ultimately last) song on "The Spot" was "Let's Go Crazy" by Prince. The flip returned the format to the market for the first time since May 2009, when KHJK flipped to adult album alternative. Much of the "Hot" airstaff was let go as a result of the format change, while morning show co-host Sarah Pepper was retained and became part of a new morning show on sister station KHMX. While considered an adult hits station, KKHH leans heavily towards a classic hits format, primarily playing music from the 1970s, 1980s, and 1990s.

The following week, struggling classic hip-hop station KROI changed its format to CHR, presumably in response to KKHH's format change.

On February 2, 2017, CBS Radio announced it would merge with Entercom. The merger was approved on November 9, 2017, and was consummated on November 17.

=== 95.7 The Fan ===
On July 22, 2026, Audacy announced that KKHH would begin simulcasting the sports talk radio format of KILT as "95.7 The Fan" on August 13. The move comes on the same day as the opening preseason game for the Houston Texans, for whom KKHH will become a de facto FM flagship station for with the move, alongside KILT and sister station KILT-FM. The move also came despite the "Spot" format, at that time, being the most listened-to in the Audacy Houston cluster with a seventh ranked 4.7 share and ranking second in overall cume in the Spring 2026 Nielsen Audio market ratings. Audacy made the move anyway with the intention of better positioning KILT's sports talk format in the market, as it competes against two other sports stations in the market with KBME (which also simulcasts in FM quality through an HD Radio simulcast on a subchannel of KTBZ-FM) and KFNC; the move also follows similar FM sports station launches by Audacy in Chicago and Los Angeles earlier in the year. The station later revealed the "Spot" format would continue on as a shuffled playlist that continued to stream through the station's former website and Audacy stream, and would be promptly transferred to the station's HD3 subchannel.

On the day promised, the "Spot" format would sign off the 95.7 frequency at 7:40 a.m. after playing the first three songs played upon the format launch in 2016 in reverse order to serve as a bookend ("Like a Prayer" by Madonna, "Sweet Child o' Mine" by Guns 'N Roses, and "Let's Go Crazy" by Prince), with a final sweeper acknowledging the format's run and reminding listeners one final time of the format's HD move and mobile applications. Following this, the station would briefly stunt with a sound collage of highlights of the station's history dating back to the days of KHUL-FM all the way up to "The Spot", before the simulcast was launched shortly thereafter. With the move, the station filed with the FCC to revert to the KIKK-FM callsign, and officially did so upon receiving their approval with the launch of the format.

== HD radio ==
KIKK-FM (as KHJZ) signed on HD Radio operations in 2006. 95.7-HD2 carried a traditional jazz format. After the flip of the analog/HD1 signal in March 2008 (which resulted in a change of callsign to KKHH), the smooth jazz format that was on the former moved to KKHH-HD2, as well as "The Wave" moniker. When CBS bought KHMX (96.5 FM) in April 2009, KKHH-HD2 and KHMX-HD2 swapped formats, with KKHH-HD2 now airing a dance format, branded as "Energy 95.7", while the smooth jazz format and "The Wave" moniker moved to KHMX-HD2. In addition, KKHH added an HD3 channel in 2010.

After two years of broadcasting the dance format on 95.7 HD2, "Energy 95-7 HD2" began offering on-demand streaming via the Radio.com app/platform and Energy957.com in the summer of 2012, joining WBBM-HD2 in Chicago, KMVQ-FM-HD2 in San Francisco, and WPGC-FM-HD2 in Washington, D.C. to offer Dance formats through the Radio.com platform. Playing a variety of EDM genres such as Progressive, Electronica, Trance, and Dance-pop, the station also airs a variety of 1990's tracks as well as limited commercial interruptions. In March 2013, the station added "Riddler's Revolution," an hour-long twice IDMA-nominated mixshow from recording artist/producer The Riddler. Specialty Holiday programming includes the annual 'Energy Beatdown,' which airs during Christmas week and showcases the year's Top 95 Dance Anthems. Also, since 2010 on New Year's Eve, the station airs a multi-hour mix show format called 'Energy Tailgate Party' featuring several of America's well-known club DJs, spinning from various cities across the country.

On November 20, 2018, KKHH-HD2 became an affiliate of Radio.com's Channel Q LGBTQ talk/dance music network.

After KKHH flipped to its current sports talk format (and reverted its callsign to KIKK-FM) in 2026, the previous adult hits format was moved to 95.7 HD3. Until the format change to sports talk, KKHH-HD3 carried a simulcast of sports talk station KIKK (now KILT). Upon the format change, this simulcast was moved to KIKK-FM-HD2, replacing Channel Q (which moved to KHMX-HD2).
