= KXJM =

Radio station in Banks–Portland, Oregon

- Banks, Oregon; United States
- Broadcast area: Portland Metropolitan Area
- Frequency: 107.5 MHz (HD Radio)
- Branding: Jam'n 107.5

Programming
- Format: Rhythmic hot AC
- Subchannels: HD2: Top 40/Dance "Pride Radio"
- Affiliations: Compass Media Networks

Ownership
- Owner: iHeartMedia, Inc.; (iHM Licenses, LLC)
- Sister stations: KKRZ, KKCW, KFBW, KLTH, KPOJ, KEX

History
- First air date: March 8, 1991 (as KDBX)
- Former call signs: KDBX (1991–1996); KBBT-FM (1996–2000); KVMX (2000–2008)
- Call sign meaning: K X JaMmin' (branding used from 1999 to 2010, revived in 2014)

Technical information
- Licensing authority: FCC
- Facility ID: 12551
- Class: C0
- ERP: 71,000 watts
- HAAT: 501.6 meters (1,646 ft)
- Transmitter coordinates: 45°30′58″N 122°43′59″W

Links
- Public license information: Public file; LMS
- Webcast: Listen live (via iHeartRadio); HD2: Listen live (via iHeartRadio)
- Website: jamn1075.iheart.com prideradio.iheart.com (HD2)

KXJM (107.5 FM, "Jam'n 107.5") is a commercial radio station licensed to Banks, Oregon and serving the Portland metropolitan area. KXJM's studios and offices are in Tigard and the transmitter is located in Portland's West Hills. The station is owned by iHeartMedia, Inc., and airs a rhythmic hot AC format.

KXJM is the second station in Portland to use these call letters. They previously were found on 95.5, which is now KBFF.

== Station history ==
=== Contemporary Christian ===
This station got its initial construction permit in June 1990 but didn't sign-on until March 8, 1991. It began as KDBX, owned by Common Ground Broadcasting, and with an effective radiated power of 3,000 watts. At first, it carried the K-Love contemporary Christian music radio format. In 1992, it became "Spirit FM 107.5" with the stated goal of playing Christian hit music 24/7, a first for the Portland market.

=== Modern AC and '80s Hits ===
On October 1, 1996, the station was bought by American Radio Systems for $14 million. American Radio would later be bought out by Infinity Broadcasting, which in turn merged with CBS Radio. The Christian format was moved to AM 800 KPDQ, while 107.5 would offer a new format. After stunting with alternative rock music for 24 hours as "107.5 The End", the station flipped to Modern AC and changed its call sign to KBBT - The Beat at 107 dot 5. Those call letters were formerly on AM 970 (now KUFO). The station specialized in newer music, but by 1999, KBBT mixed in 1980s' hits as well. On June 2, 2000, most of the on-air staff was fired, with exception of Cort Webber (of Cort and Fatboy fame) and Troy Daniels. The station flipped to KVMX Mix 107.5 with an all-1980s hits format. In 2006, it shifted to a "Rock Hits" format focusing mostly on rock music from the 1980s, and picked up Bob Rivers' syndicated morning show, which was based at KZOK-FM in Seattle.

=== Movin 107.5 ===
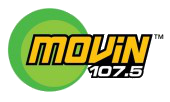
Movin 107.5 logo used 2006–2008.

On October 5, 2006, at 10 a.m., immediately after Rivers' show, KVMX changed its format to Rhythmic Hot AC as "MOViN 107.5". The "MOViN'" brand had previously been picked up by KQMV in Seattle, KMVN in Los Angeles, KYMV in Salt Lake City, KFRC in San Francisco, WMVN/St. Louis and KMVK in Dallas (KMVK used the same logo as KVMX due to both stations being at 107.5.)

KVMX's Program Director, Lisa Adams (who continued in the same position after KVMX's transition to Rhythmic Top 40 in May 2008), was KQMV's first PD the day it launched its "MOViN'" format in May 2006, and had been formerly a DJ with KBBT. Around this same time, the station got a sizable boost in its audio signal, going from 2,000 watts to 36,000 watts along with an increase in its antenna height. The move essentially gave KVMX a signal equal to the other major Portland-area FM stations.

=== JAMMiN' 107-5 ===
On May 1, 2008, Rose City Radio Corporation announced it would change the format of KXJM, "Jammin' 95.5", the market's first Rhythmic Contemporary station, to all sports on May 12, 2008 as "95.5 The Game." The shift almost left Portland without a hip-hop-based station, and possibly without a home for "The Playhouse" morning radio show.

But that would all change eight days later, when KVMX dropped the "MOViN'" format to become Portland's newest Rhythmic Contemporary outlet. The transition began May 9, at 6 p.m., when CBS Radio acquired the Rhythmic format, the website and intellectual properties, including the popular morning show "The Playhouse" and the KXJM call letters, from Rose City. While the changes were underway, both KVMX and KXJM simulcast via KXJM's web stream. The transition was completed on May 12, 2008 at 9 a.m., as the 107.5 frequency become the new "JAMMiN' 107-5" KXJM, "Portland's Hits & Hip-Hop", while the original KXJM became "95.5 The Game". "The Playhouse" was simulcast on both KVMX and KXJM on May 12, then kicked off Jammin' 107-5's new lineup on May 13. On May 27, 2008, the KVMX to KXJM call letter change was approved by the FCC, while 95.5 became KXTG. In May 2011, KXTG's sports format moved to 750 AM and 95.5 became KBFF.

In December 2008, CBS Radio traded KXJM and KLTH to Clear Channel Communications in a five station exchange deal for Clear Channel's Houston outlets KLOL and KHMX. The deal was completed on April 1, 2009. KXJM came under common ownership with its longtime rival KKRZ, which Clear Channel owned prior to the acquisition of KXJM.

In December 2009, The Playhouse was dropped from the KXJM lineup.

=== WiLD 107.5 ===
"WiLD 107.5" logo from March 15, 2010 to February 20, 2014

On March 15, 2010, at 10 am, after playing "Carry Out" by Timbaland, KXJM relaunched its Rhythmic CHR format as "WiLD 107.5" and adopted the slogan "Portland's Party Hits." Although the KXJM call letters remained, a new logo was patterned after its sister station in San Francisco, KYLD. KXJM's first song as "WiLD 107.5" was "La La La" by LMFAO.

The station added Friday and Saturday Night live mix show broadcasts from 9 pm to Midnight, along with a nightly mix from 9–10 pm Monday through Thursday. The changes helped WiLD 107.5 to improve its ratings for 18–34 year old listeners. In the June 2011 PPMs, KXJM posted its best ratings in nearly four years since its move from the 95.5 signal, overtaking KKRZ as the most listened-to contemporary outlet in Portland.

=== JAM'N 107.5 ===
On February 20, 2014, at Noon, KXJM relaunched as "JAM'N 107.5." The music is focused on current Rhythmic hits, with some gold and re-current music in its library, as well as adding more Hip-Hop/R&B material while decreasing the Dance-Pop tracks. KXJM began using the slogan "Jams from Today & Back in the Day." The station's moniker and logo are based on sister station WJMN in Boston.

During the latter weeks of December 2016 and the first two weeks of January 2017, KXJM began reducing the currents on its playlist, and shifted towards older hip hop hits. The station is currently ranked #5 with a 5.0 share according to the Portland Nielsen Audio PPMs.

== KXJM-HD2 ==
On June 3, 2010, KXJM signed on its HD2 channel with a rhythmic adult contemporary format, branded as "Rhythmix." It was a similar format as "MOViN," previously heard on 107.5 before its flip to Rhythmic Top 40 in May 2008. In January 2012, 107.5 HD2 flipped to all-dance music, and rebranded as "Too Wild." It was programmed by Michael Oaks (Mike O.), who had programmed rhythmic stations in Las Vegas and Phoenix. In June 2016, KXJM-HD2 flipped to the "Pride Radio" format found on the iHeartRadio line up.

== Logos ==
Original Jammin' 95.5 logo from 1999 to 2008.
