= KKRZ =

Contemporary hit radio station in Portland, Oregon

Coordinates: 45.522°N 122.747°W

- Portland, Oregon; United States
- Broadcast area: Northwestern Oregon, Southwestern Washington
- Frequency: 100.3 MHz (HD Radio)
- Branding: Z100

Programming
- Format: Top 40 (CHR)
- Subchannels: HD2: Alternative rock "Alt 102.3"
- Affiliations: Premiere Networks; KATU for traffic and weather reports

Ownership
- Owner: iHeartMedia; (iHM Licenses, LLC)
- Sister stations: KEX, KFBW, KKCW, KLTH, KPOJ, KXJM

History
- First air date: May 7, 1946 (as KGW-FM on 95.3)
- Former call signs: KGW-FM (1946–1950) & (1952–1954); KQFM (1954–1983)
- Former frequencies: 95.3 MHz (1946–1947)
- Call sign meaning: K K RoZe ("Rose" as in "Rose City")

Technical information
- Licensing authority: FCC
- Facility ID: 11280
- Class: C
- ERP: 100,000 watts
- HAAT: 470 meters (1,540 ft)
- Translators: 102.3 K272EL (Portland, relays HD2)

Links
- Public license information: Public file; LMS
- Webcast: Listen Live; Listen Live (HD2)
- Website: z100portland.iheart.com alt1023fm.iheart.com (HD2)

KKRZ (100.3 MHz) is a commercial FM radio station in Portland, Oregon, known as Z100. It is owned by iHeartMedia and airs a contemporary hit radio (CHR) format. The studios and offices are on SW 68th Parkway in Tigard.

KKRZ has an effective radiated power (ERP) of 100,000 watts, the maximum for most U.S. FM stations. Its transmitter site is in Portland's West Hills, off NW Skyline Boulevard.

KKRZ also transmits using HD Radio technology. Its HD2 digital subchannel carries an alternative rock format known as "Alt 102.3." That signal feeds the 99-watt FM translator K272EL on 102.3 MHz.

== Programming ==
Z100 carries a pair of syndicated shows on weekdays, "Johnjay and Rich" in morning drive time and Ryan Seacrest at midday. Local DJs are heard in the afternoon and evening.

In addition to the morning show, KKRZ's weekday lineup includes On Air with Ryan Seacrest in middays, Maui in early afternoons, Zann in afternoon drive time, and Jake B. in the evening. Other personalities include Kayla, Sos and Matt Holiday. Weekends feature American Top 40 with Ryan Seacrest, the iHeartRadio Countdown, On The Move with Enrique Santos, Most Requested Live with Romeo and The Vibe with Tanya and EJ. Weather reports are provided by ABC affiliate KATU, and traffic reports are supplied by sister station KEX.

== History ==
=== Original KGW-FM (1946-1950) ===
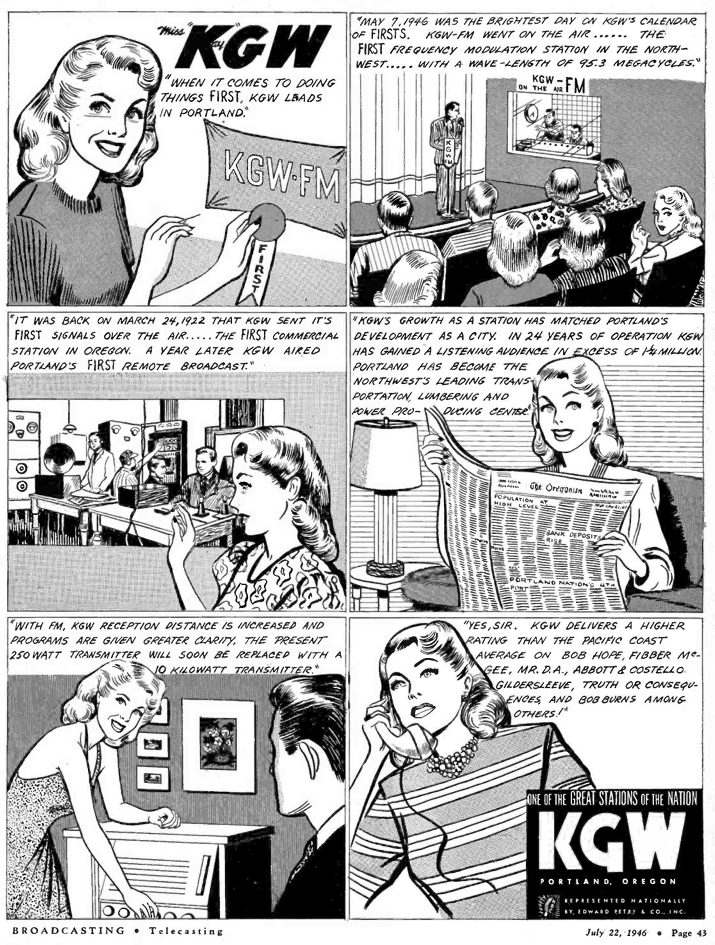
"Miss KayGW" announcing the 1946 establishment of KGW-FM, "the first frequency modulation station in the north-west".

Technically there have been two separate Portland stations operating at FM 100.3. The original KGW-FM began broadcasting at 4:50 p.m. on May 7, 1946, as the first FM station in Oregon. KGW-FM initially broadcast on 95.3 MHz, and moved to 100.3 MHz on September 22, 1947. KGW-AM-FM were both owned by Portland's daily newspaper, The Oregonian. KGW-FM mostly simulcast its AM counterpart, which was affiliated with the NBC Red Network, carrying its dramas, comedies, news, sports, soap operas, game shows and big band broadcasts during the "Golden Age of Radio".

The original KGW-FM ceased broadcasting on February 1, 1950, and returned its license to the Federal Communications Commission (FCC) for cancellation. An offer to donate its transmitter to the Portland School Board, which had operated an AM station, KBPS, since 1923, was turned down, because "too much expense would be involved in conversion of present AM receivers in the schools". KGW-FM's demise raised doubts about FM's future, as one reviewer asked: "Is KGW, which led Portland stations' parade into FM, leading a parade back out? Are FM set owners eventually to be tuned in only to static-free silence?"

=== Revival (1952) ===
In late 1950, ownership of KGW (AM) was transferred to Pioneer Broadcasters, Inc. On August 17, 1951, the FCC received an application from Pioneer Broadcasters for what was technically a new FM station, transmitting on the vacated 100.3 MHz frequency. The applicants were quoted that "As far as we know we are the first licensee to reapply for permission to operate FM facilities", however, "we believe that there is a definite future for FM operation". Although the revived station initially received the call sign KGW-FM, and transmitted on the same frequency used by the original station, FCC records treated this as a new operation, separate from the 1946-1950 version. However, station histories have traditionally treated this as a continuation of the original KGW-FM.

The revived KGW-FM returned in early 1952. In 1954 its license was transferred to H. Quenton Cox, and because it was no longer co-owned with KGW (AM), on December 1st the call letters were changed to KQFM. At first, KQFM aired a "good music" format of softer popular songs. This evolved over time to an easy listening format known as "Q-Music." The station played mostly instrumental cover versions of popular songs, as well as Broadway and Hollywood showtunes.

In 1978, KQFM switched to a progressive rock sound under the name "Q-100". The following year, the station was acquired by Golden West Broadcasting, owned by singer-actor Gene Autry. Golden West already owned KEX, so the two stations were managed and operated together. KQFM's format was changed to oldies on March 16, 1981 as "Solid Gold FM-100."

=== Z100 ===
On November 2, 1983, the station changed to the KKRZ call letters and switched to a Hot Adult Contemporary format as "The Rose," playing off of Portland's nickname as "The Rose City." KKRZ began its current Top 40 format on March 16, 1984, widely mirroring co-owned WHTZ in New York City (including the moniker familiar "Z100" name).

In 1986, the station adopted a more rhythmic-leaning format due to the lack of an existing urban contemporary station in Portland. In 1999, KKRZ picked up competition from Adult Contemporary-formatted KXL-FM, who flipped to rhythmic CHR, becoming KXJM, "Jammin 95.5." This competition between the two would last for nine years, as KXJM (whose playlist favored Hip-Hop/R&B and some Dance product) would overtake KKRZ (who shifted back to a more mainstream direction).

KXJM saw its ratings decline by 2007 and switched to Sports Talk as KXTG in May 2008. In response, KKRZ would add more Rhythmic crossovers to its playlist again, but later faced new competition from CBS Radio outlet KVMX, who dropped its Rhythmic Adult Contemporary format and picked up KXJM's Rhythmic CHR format and intellectual property, including the KXJM call letters and "Jammin'" branding, from Rose City Radio Corporation, the owners of KXTG. KKRZ's playlist later returned to the center and became a more balanced Top 40/CHR.

=== Clear Channel ownership ===
On April 1, 2009, Clear Channel Communications took over ownership of KXJM from CBS, thus making KKRZ and KXJM sister stations. At first, both stations retained their respective formats. In March 2010, KXJM relaunched as "WiLD 107.5", but kept its Rhythmic Top 40 format. Despite the fact that both KKRZ and KXJM are under the same ownership, and being programmed by the same program director, KKRZ continues to focus on Mainstream Pop/Rock hits.

On September 16, 2014, Clear Channel renamed itself iHeartMedia to bring its corporate name in line with its iHeartRadio internet platform.

== Morning Shows ==
Z100 has had several noteworthy morning shows in its history. The "Z Morning Zoo" started in 1984 (the year Z100 signed on), and had multiple hosts and co-hosts over the years. These included Gary Bryan, Dan Clark, John Murphy, Tony Martinez, Nelson the Intern, Scott Thrower, Billy Hayes, Valerie Ring and Brooke Belson. The Z Morning Zoo lasted until 2000, when Nelson left to join Terry Boyd at KRSK Rosey 105.1. The show had different DJ's from 2000-2002 including Dr. Doug, Stacey Lynn, and Skippy The Prize Guy from 2000-2002. Dr. Doug and Skippy also left to KRSK 105.1 to do PM drive. Z100 ran a heartbeat for 24hrs waiting for the "All New Z100" and launched the new morning show "Chet Buchannan & Nicole Camarata."

They lasted until 2002, when "The BuckHead Show" debuted, which lasted about five years. In the same week that BuckHead received the Edison Media Top 30 Under 30 Personality Award, KKRZ management Brian Bridgman, Tony Coles and Robert Dove began running short, cryptic spots about "T-Man" coming to Portland. On August 31, 2007, BuckHead's morning fill-in host Brooke Fox announced that indeed, "The T-Man Show" was coming to Z100 mornings on Tuesday, September 4, 2007. The T-Man Show was based in Seattle at co-owned KUBE and was also syndicated in San Francisco at iHeart-owned KYLD, before being pulled after six months. The T-Man Show could still be heard in Seattle and San Francisco until the show ended in 2009. The Johnjay and Rich Show, based at iHeart's KZZP Phoenix, began airing on KKRZ in 2008.

== HD Radio ==
KKRZ broadcasts in the HD Radio format. KKRZ-HD2 airs alternative rock, branded as "Alt 102.3." It is simulcast on 99-watt FM translator K272EL at 102.3 MHz. On weekday mornings, Alt 102.3 carries "The Woody Show" from KYSR Los Angeles.

== Former logo ==
former logo
