= Portland Trail Blazers Radio Network =

Radio network broadcasting Portland Trail Blazers basketball games

- Type: Radio network
- Country: United States
- Headquarters: Portland, Oregon
- Broadcast area: Oregon; Washington(limited)
- Owner: Portland Trail Blazers
- Official website: TrailBlazers.com

The Portland Trail Blazers Radio Network is an American radio network consisting of 18 radio stations which carry coverage of the National Basketball Association (NBA)'s Portland Trail Blazers.

The Radio Network has one flagship station (KPOJ) and 17 affiliate stations in Oregon and Washington. Travis Demers is the play-by-play announcer and former Trail Blazers player Michael Holton is the color analyst for home games. Chad Doing is studio host. Rich “The Captain”Patterson is the network producer. On March 9, 2025, Patterson worked his 3,000 consecutive radio broadcast.

== Station list ==
Map of network stations in Oregon and surrounding states

Call sign	Frequency	Band	City	State	Network status
KPOJ	620	AM	Portland	Oregon	Flagship
KLOO	1340	AM	Albany	Oregon	Affiliate
KKOR	1230	AM	Astoria	Oregon	Affiliate
KBKR	1490	AM	Baker City	Oregon	Affiliate
KBND	1110	AM	Bend	Oregon	Affiliate
KURY	910	AM	Brookings	Oregon	Affiliate
KHSN	1230	AM	Coos Bay	Oregon	Affiliate
KORE	1050/95.7	AM	Springfield-Eugene	Oregon	Affiliate
KJDY	1400	AM	John Day	Oregon	Affiliate
KLOG	1490	AM	Kelso	Washington	Affiliate
KFLS	1450	AM	Klamath Falls	Oregon	Affiliate
KBCH	1400	AM	Lincoln City	Oregon	Affiliate
KNPT	1310	AM	Newport	Oregon	Affiliate
KTIX	1240	AM	Pendleton	Oregon	Affiliate
KRCO	690	AM	Prineville	Oregon	Affiliate
KSKR	1490	AM	Roseburg	Oregon	Affiliate
KODL	1440	AM	The Dalles	Oregon	Affiliate
KTIL	1590	AM	Tillamook	Oregon	Affiliate
