= Dóttir (restaurant) =

Restaurant in Portland, Oregon, U.S.

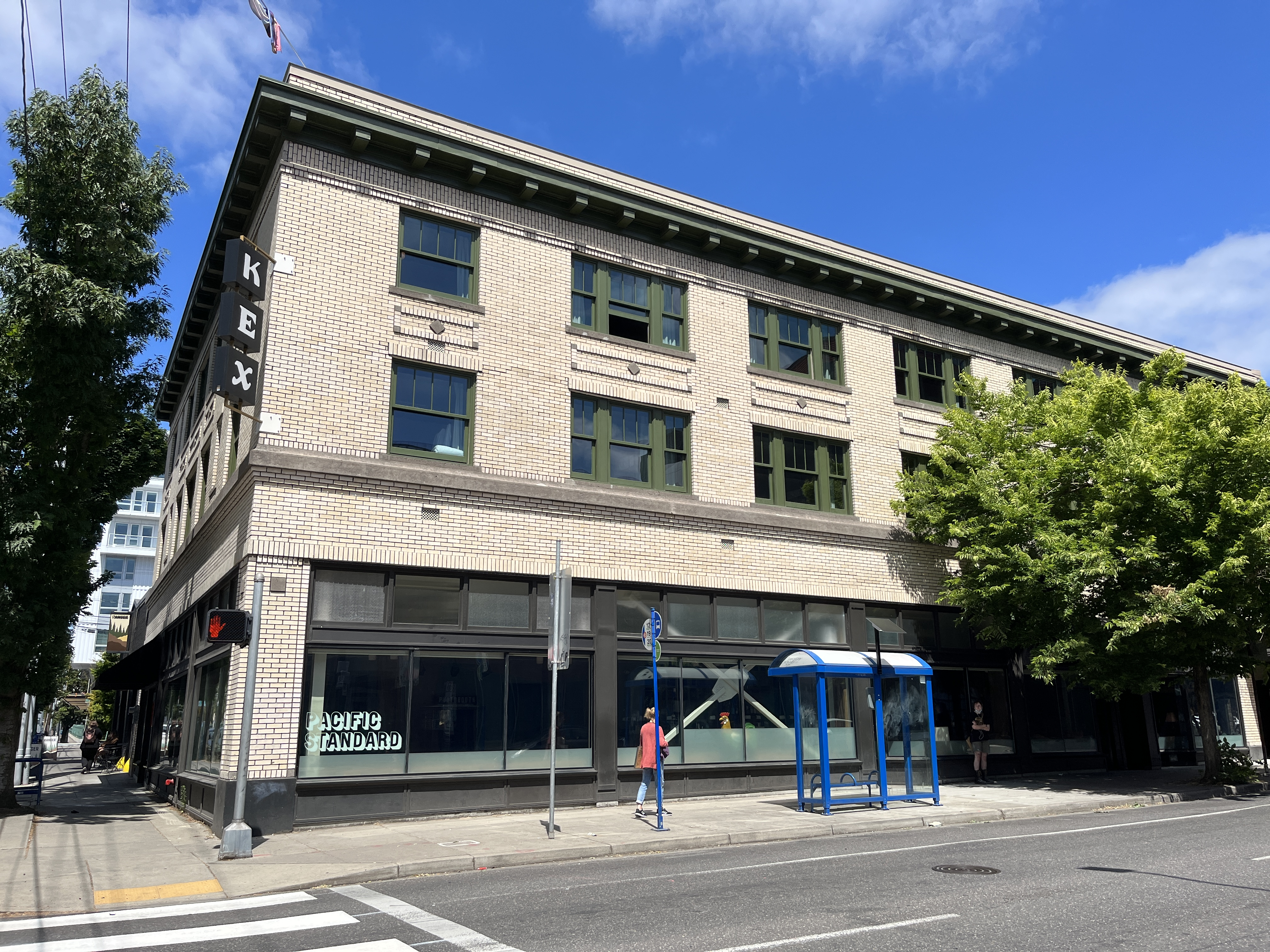
- Exterior of the KEX Hotel in 2022, following the restaurant's closure
- Interactive map of Dóttir

Restaurant information
- Established: 2019
- Closed: January 1, 2022
- Food type: Icelandic; Nordic; Pacific Northwest
- Location: Portland, Multnomah, Oregon, United States
- Coordinates: 45.5238°N 122.6615°W

Dóttir was a restaurant in Portland, Oregon's KEX Hotel, in the United States. The restaurant closed on January 1, 2022.

== Description and history ==
Dóttir (Icelandic: "daughter") was a 3,500-square-foot restaurant on the ground floor of the KEX Hotel on Martin Luther King Jr. Boulevard. Described as having "Icelandic-Pacific-Northwestern" (Icelandic/Nordic and Pacific Northwest) cuisine, the restaurant opened in 2019. Ólafur Ágústsson and Alex Jackson served as culinary director and executive chef.

Dóttir began serving brunch in January 2020. After closing during the COVID-19 pandemic, the restaurant reopened in mid 2021 with Michael Zeman as chef. Dóttir closed on January 1, 2022.

== See also ==
- List of Pacific Northwest restaurants
