= KEX Hotel =

Hotel in Portland, Oregon, U.S.

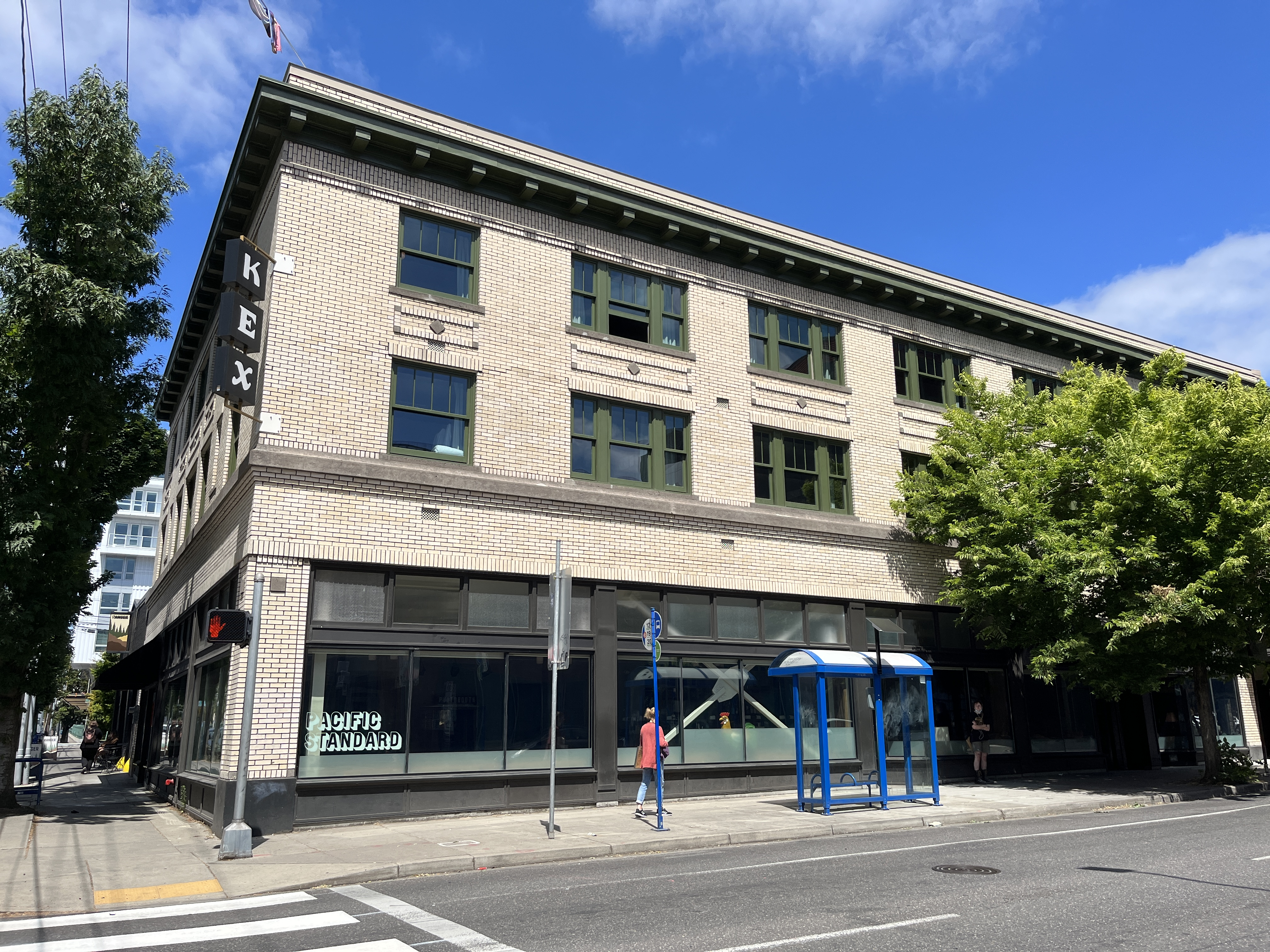
- The hotel's exterior, 2022
- Interactive map of the KEX Hotel area

General information
- Type: Hotel
- Location: Northeast Martin Luther King Jr. Boulevard and Couch Street, Portland, Oregon, United States
- Coordinates: 45°31′25.7″N 122°39′41.1″W

The KEX Hotel is a hotel at the intersection of Northeast Martin Luther King Jr. Boulevard and Couch Street in Portland, Oregon, United States. Kex is based in Reykjavík, and the Portland location is the brand's first hotel outside Iceland. In 2025, this was still their only hotel in North America. The hotel is unconnected in any way to Portland radio station KEX (1190).

== History ==
The hotel closed temporarily during the COVID-19 pandemic, reopening in June 2021.

KEX Hotel featured Dóttir, until the restaurant closed on January 1, 2022. It was replaced by Pacific Standard.
