= KEX (AM) =

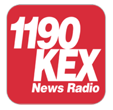
- Portland, Oregon; United States
- Broadcast area: Northwestern Oregon and Southwestern Washington
- Frequency: 1190 kHz
- Branding: NewsRadio 1190 KEX

Programming
- Format: News/talk
- Network: 24/7 News
- Affiliations: ABC News Radio; Bloomberg Radio; Premiere Networks; KATU (News and Weather)

Ownership
- Owner: iHeartMedia, Inc.; (iHM Licenses, LLC)
- Sister stations: KKRZ, KKCW, KFBW, KLTH, KXJM, KPOJ

History
- First air date: December 23, 1926
- Former frequencies: 670 kHz (1926–1927); 1240 kHz (1927); 1250 kHz (1927–1928); 1080 kHz (1928); 1180 kHz (1928–1941)
- Call sign meaning: None, randomly assigned

Technical information
- Licensing authority: FCC
- Facility ID: 11271
- Class: A
- Power: 50,000 watts
- Transmitter coordinates: 45°25′19.4″N 122°34′1.3″W
- Repeater: 106.7 KLTH-HD2 (Lake Oswego)

Links
- Public license information: Public file; LMS
- Webcast: Listen Live
- Website: 1190kex.iheart.com

KEX (1190 kHz) is a clear channel AM radio station licensed to Portland, Oregon, United States. It is owned by iHeartMedia, Inc., and airs a news/talk format known as NewsRadio 1190. The station's studios and offices are on SW 68th Parkway, off Interstate 5 in Tigard, Oregon.

Because KEX is a 50,000-watt Class A station, it reaches all of the Portland metropolitan area and beyond, providing grade B coverage as far south as Corvallis and as far east as The Dalles. At night, KEX can be heard around the Western United States and Western Canada. The transmitter is located off SE Lawnfield Road in Sunnyside. It uses a non-directional antenna in the daytime, but at night, to protect other stations on 1190 AM, it switches to a directional antenna with a three-tower array.

== Programming ==
KEX airs nationally syndicated talk shows, largely from Premiere Networks, a subsidiary of iHeartMedia. Weekdays begin with Armstrong & Getty from co-owned KSTE in Sacramento. That is followed by The Clay Travis and Buck Sexton Show; The Jesse Kelly Show; The Michael Berry Show from co-owned KTRH in Houston; The Glenn Beck Radio Program; Our American Stories with Lee Habeeb; The Michael DelGiorono Show and Coast to Coast AM with George Noory. A popular Premiere Networks talk program not carried by KEX is The Sean Hannity Show, which airs instead on KUFO 970 AM.

Weekends feature shows on money, cars, computers and home repair, as well as repeats of some weekday shows and some paid brokered programming. Syndicated shows heard on weekends include The Weekend with Michael Brown, Bill Handel on the Law, At Home with Gary Sullivan and Sunday Night with Bill Cunningham.

KATU Channel 2, the ABC television affiliate in Portland, supplies local news and weather. ABC News Radio is heard at the beginning of most hours with some news and sports reports from NBC News Radio also heard. Bloomberg Radio provides business news updates.

The radio station has no relation to the KEX Hotel, an Icelandic-owned hotel in downtown Portland.

== History ==
=== Blue Network ===
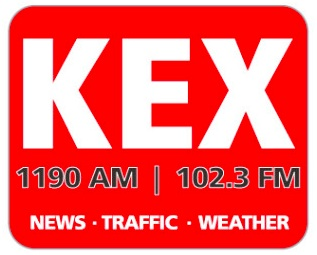
former logo while simulcasting on 102.3 FM

On December 23, 1926, KEX first signed on the air. The call sign was randomly assigned. Some sources show that the station may have originally started broadcasting on 670 kHz. On November 11, 1928, KEX started transmitting on 1180 kHz under the terms of the Federal Radio Commission's General Order 40. On March 29, 1941, the station moved to 1190 kHz under the terms of the North American Regional Broadcasting Agreement (NARBA).

KEX was an NBC Blue Network affiliate, carrying its schedule of dramas, comedies, news, sports, game shows, soap operas and big band broadcasts during the "Golden Age of Radio." In 1945, as the Blue Network became ABC Radio, KEX's affiliation continued. KEX was the first station to give the voice of Bugs Bunny, Mel Blanc, his own show. Blanc's Cobwebs & Nuts program debuted June 15, 1933, and ran Monday through Saturday from 11 p.m. to midnight.

=== The Oregonian and Westinghouse ===
The Oregonian Publishing Company, which owned The Morning Oregonian newspaper, acquired KEX in 1933. From 1934 to 1943, the station's studios were located in The Oregonian Building, in space shared with co-owned KGW, now KPOJ, which was the NBC Red Network affiliate in Portland. Westinghouse Broadcasting expanded to the West Coast in 1944 with its purchase of KEX, then running 5,000 watts, and sharing its frequency with another Westinghouse station, WOWO in Fort Wayne, Indiana.

In 1948, Westinghouse got the Federal Communications Commission (FCC) to increase KEX's power to 50,000 watts, day and night. Also in 1948, Westinghouse put KEX-FM on the air at 92.3 MHz (the frequency is now utilized by KGON). KEX-FM simulcast most of KEX's schedule. But few people had FM radios in those days and KEX-FM was taken off the air in the early 1960s. Also in the early 1960s, as network programming shifted from radio to television, KEX began airing a mix of middle of the road music, talk, news and sports.

=== Gene Autry and Clear Channel ===
Having reached the FCC's then-limit of seven AM stations, Westinghouse sold KEX to actor and singer Gene Autry's media company, Golden West Broadcasters, in 1967. In 1984, KEX was acquired by Taft Broadcasting. Taft became Citicasters in 1993. In 1996 Citicasters was acquired by Jacor Communications which was merged into Clear Channel Communications in 1999. Clear Channel was the forerunner to current owner iHeartMedia, Inc. As music listening switched to FM radio stations, KEX cut back on the songs it played till it became a true talk station by the late 1990s.

On March 30, 2011, KEX began simulcasting on FM once again, using translator station K272EL at 102.3 MHz. It also could be heard on the HD2 subchannel of co-owned KKRZ. The addition of K272EL was in response to rival news/talk outlet KXL's move from 750 AM to 101.1 FM. On September 9, 2013, KEX's FM simulcast ended, with KKRZ-HD2 and K272EL switching to an alternative rock format, branded as "Radio 102.3". In 2021, KEX was once again heard on a local HD subchannel, on KLTH-HD2 at 106.7 MHz.

KEX has not broadcast any local talk programming since April 2023, when midday host Mark Mason departed the station. The station relies on nationally syndicated shows from co-owned Premiere Networks.

=== Sports ===
KEX became the flagship station of the Oregon State Beavers for the 2012–2013 season.

Until 2013, KEX was the flagship station of the NBA Portland Trail Blazers. In the event of a conflict with the Beavers, Blazers broadcasts were moved to co-owned KPOJ 620 AM. The Blazers moved to KPOJ entirely in 2013.

=== Past personalities ===
- Bill Adams – sportscaster (1937–39)
- Barney Keep – morning show (1944–79)
- Paul Linnman – morning show (2003–14)
- Mark Mason — afternoon show (1995–2013); midday show (2017–23)

== See also ==
- List of three-letter broadcast call signs in the United States
