= KFBW =

Radio station in Vancouver, Washington

- Vancouver, Washington; United States
- Broadcast area: Portland, Oregon; Salem, Oregon; Vancouver, Washington
- Frequency: 105.9 MHz (HD Radio)
- Branding: 105.9 The Brew

Programming
- Format: Mainstream rock
- Subchannels: HD2: Contemporary worship music "Worship 24/7"

Ownership
- Owner: iHeartMedia, Inc.; (iHM Licenses, LLC)
- Sister stations: KKRZ, KKCW, KLTH, KXJM, KPOJ, KEX

History
- First air date: February 5, 2001 (as KBET-FM)
- Former call signs: KXMX (1998–1999, CP); KKLQ (1999–2000, CP); KBET-FM (2000–2001); KSTE-FM (2001–2002); KRVO (2002–2005); KIJZ (2005–2007); KQOL (2007–2009)
- Call sign meaning: K F BreW

Technical information
- Licensing authority: FCC
- Facility ID: 60640
- Class: C1
- ERP: 22,500 watts
- HAAT: 470 meters (1,540 ft)
- Transmitter coordinates: 45°31′21.00″N 122°44′45.00″W
- Translator: HD2: 94.9 K235CU (Longview)

Links
- Public license information: Public file; LMS
- Webcast: Listen Live
- Website: 1059thebrew.iheart.com

KFBW (105.9 FM) is a commercial radio station licensed to Vancouver, Washington, and broadcasting to the Portland metropolitan area. Owned by iHeartMedia, Inc., the station airs a mainstream rock radio format with emphasis on the late 1970s, 1980s, 1990s and early 2000s, branded as "105.9 The Brew". The transmitter is located in Portland's west hills and the studios are in Tigard, Oregon.

== History ==
The station was initially licensed to the Cincinnati-based Citicasters as of February 1996, when that broadcasting group was acquired by Jacor Communications. The station has had seven call signs since mid-1998. While owned by Jacor, it changed call letters to KXMX. When Jacor sold it to Clear Channel Communications, the call letters changed to KKLQ. In August 2000, it switched its call letters to KBET. The station officially signed on air with a modern adult contemporary music format branded as "Star 105.9" on February 5, 2001; to match the format, the call letters changed to KSTE-FM. It is also noted that the station used the same logo and slogan as Los Angeles station KYSR. At that time, both stations aired a Modern AC format.

On June 21, 2002, KSTE-FM dropped the modern adult contemporary music format, likely due to lackluster ratings and direct competition from cross-town KRSK, which aired a similar modern adult contemporary music format. KSTE-FM then began stunting with short clips of almost all music genres branded as "Quick 106" (this stunt was used earlier in the year on KJR in Seattle).

On June 25, 2002, KSTE-FM adopted a classic rock music format branded as "The River". A change of call letters followed on June 28, 2002 to KRVO to better match "The River" branding.

On November 4, 2005, KRVO changed formats yet again, adopting the smooth jazz music format that the Portland metropolitan area was lacking since the demise of KKJZ (now KLTH) on February 1, 2002. A change of call letters to KIJZ was made to match the name of the format and new branding as "Smooth Jazz 105.9", a format now heard on sister station KKCW's HD2 subchannel.

On August 30, 2007, KIJZ changed their format to classic hits, with the slogan "Kool 105.9" and changed their call letters to KQOL on September 5, 2007. The music, originally heavy on music from the 1970s and early 1980s, was shifted in spring 2008 to more of an evenly 60s/70s based format. After Clear Channel purchased KLTH and its classic hits format from CBS Radio in April 2009, it is now in the same building as KLTH.

On May 6, 2009, KQOL began stunting, directing listeners to KLTH. On May 8, KQOL launched an 1980s-based classic rock format and adopted its current branding "105.9 The Brew". The station changed their call letters to KFBW on June 2, 2009 to make it branding-appropriate. As of 2011, it began to expand its library to include tracks from the late 1960s, 1970s and early 1990s, along with the new slogan "Next Generation of Classic Rock" to reflect the adjustment. In the fall of 2013, KFBW adjusted its slogan to "Real Classic Rock". In January 2014, KFBW adjusted its slogan again, this time as "Portland's Rock Station".

== Branding ==
- KXMX (1998–1999)
- KKLQ (1999–2000)
- KBET (2000–2001)
- "Star 105.9" /KSTE (2001–2002)
- "105.9 The River" /KRVO (2002–2005)
- "Smooth Jazz 105.9"/KIJZ (2005–2007)
- "Kool 105.9"/KQOL (2007–2009)
- "105.9 The Brew"/KFBW (2009–Present)

== KFBW-HD2 ==
KFBW-HD2 features a Contemporary worship music format from the Worship 24/7 network. Its programming can also be heard on local translator K235CU 94.9 MHz in Longview.

== KFBW-HD3 ==
KFBW-HD3 featured a classic country format branded as "103.7 The Legend" and was simulcast on FM translator K279BO 103.7 FM in Portland, owned by Educational Media Foundation.

On May 9, 2019, K279BO dropped its simulcast with KFBW-HD3 and switched to "K-Love Classics" (simulcasting KLVP-HD3).

The HD3 subchannel has since been turned off.
