= KILT (AM) =

Radio station in Pasadena, Texas, United States

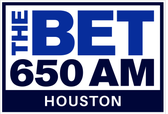
- Pasadena, Texas; United States
- Broadcast area: Greater Houston
- Frequency: 650 kHz
- Branding: The Bet Houston

Programming
- Language: English
- Format: Sports gambling
- Affiliations: BetMGM Network; Westwood One Sports

Ownership
- Owner: Audacy, Inc.; (Audacy License, LLC)
- Sister stations: KHMX; KILT-FM; KIKK; KIKK-FM; KLOL

History
- First air date: October 2, 1947 (as KRCT)
- Former call signs: KRCT (1947–1961); KIKK (1961–2026)
- Call sign meaning: Nickname and ethnicity of former owner of 610 AM, Gordon "Old Scotchman" McLendon

Technical information
- Licensing authority: FCC
- Facility ID: 25450
- Class: D
- Power: 250 watts day
- Transmitter coordinates: 29°41′18″N 95°10′29″W
- Repeater: 95.7 KIKK-FM-HD2 (Houston)

Links
- Public license information: Public file; LMS
- Webcast: Listen live (via Audacy)
- Website: www.audacy.com/thebethouston

KILT (650 AM) is a daytime-only station, licensed to Pasadena, Texas, which broadcasts a sports gambling format under ownership of Audacy, Inc. Its studios are located in the Greenway Plaza district of Houston, and its transmitter is located in Pasadena. While it only broadcasts during daytime hours at 250 watts, KILT's low frequency gives the station a large coverage area, stretching from Flatonia, Texas, to the west, and past Lake Charles, Louisiana, to the east.

== History ==
KILT commenced operations as radio station KRCT in 1947, licensed to Baytown. The Bay Broadcasting Company was the original owner, having built and operated the station since its inception. Bay Broadcasting would sell KRCT to Industrial Broadcasting Company in 1958, not long after moving it from the original tower site in Baytown to Pasadena. On May 1, 1961, KRCT changed call letters to KIKK.

The station only operates from local sunrise to local sunset in order to protect clear-channel WSM in Nashville. For a time in the 1960s, Industrial attempted to operate KIKK earlier than sunrise in Houston and Nashville and begin operations at 6:00 am each day. This was denied at district court and appeals court, and the station's prior operation at such times was sanctioned with a US$10,000 fine from the Federal Communications Commission.

Throughout the 1970s, 1980s, and early 1990s, 650 kHz was the country music station in Houston. It simulcast with FM sister station KIKK-FM, and was part of a heated country war with KILT (610 AM) and KILT-FM until 1994.

By this point, KILT (AM) dropped the country format programming it has been utilizing since 1981, becoming Houston's first sports station, while KIKK was merely filling time by simulcasting its FM sister full-time. KIKK AM finally broke the simulcast with 95.7 MHz, and flipped to business news as "Business Radio 650" in 1996.

KIKK changed formats in July 2004 to hot talk under the moniker KIKK Ass 650, which became the Houston home for The Howard Stern Show. After Stern's move to Sirius Satellite Radio in December 2005, KIKK switched to a news format and was affiliated with CNN Headline News. Their early evening schedule was composed of adult standards music until 2008, when Headline News completely took over the rest of the schedule, but that network's continuous move away from rolling news to focus more on personality talk caused the station to seek other programming such as the Clark Howard Show, which then took up most of the station's schedule. In 2010, the station flipped to a local personality-emphasizing talk format (branded simply as "Talk 650"); however, it switched to an all-syndicated lineup in July 2011.

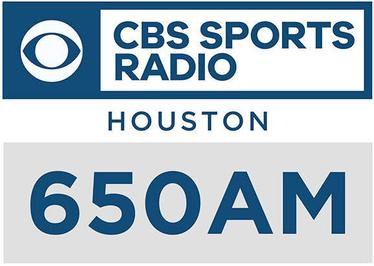
Logo as "CBS Sports Radio 650"

KIKK dropped its talk format on January 2, 2013, and became a sports radio station affiliated with CBS Sports Radio. The network's national programming complemented the locally focused sports format on sister station KILT.

On February 2, 2017, CBS Radio announced it would merge with Entercom. The merger was approved on November 9, 2017, and was consummated on November 17.

On June 21, 2021, KIKK flipped to sports gambling, branded as "The Bet Houston", with programming from the co-owned BetQL Network. CBS Sports Radio programming remained in certain timeslots.

On July 22, 2026, Audacy announced that sister station KILT would begin simulcasting on KKHH (95.7 FM), with the FM station returning to the KIKK-FM call sign. Following the change, KIKK and KILT swapped call signs in August 2026.

== Programming ==
KILT begins daily broadcasts at local sunrise (typical of daytime-only AMs) but usually is on the air by 6 a.m. Central in most cases. The station carries the entire daytime lineup of the BetMGM Network. It signs off at sunset to protect WSM. It simulcasts 24/7 on 95.7 KIKK-FM-HD2.
