= KILT-FM =

- Houston, Texas; United States
- Broadcast area: Greater Houston
- Frequency: 100.3 MHz (HD Radio)
- Branding: 100.3 The Bull

Programming
- Language: English
- Format: Country
- Subchannels: HD2: Texas country music

Ownership
- Owner: Audacy, Inc.; (Audacy License, LLC)
- Sister stations: KHMX; KIKK; KIKK-FM; KILT; KLOL

History
- First air date: July 1961
- Former call signs: KOST (1961–1967); KZAP (1967–1968); KILT-FM (1967–1984); KXAS-FM (1984–1985)
- Call sign meaning: Nickname/ethnicity of former owner, Gordon "Old Scotchman" McLendon

Technical information
- Licensing authority: FCC
- Facility ID: 25439
- Class: C
- ERP: 100,000 watts
- HAAT: 585 meters (1,919 ft)
- Transmitter coordinates: 29°34′34″N 95°30′36″W

Links
- Public license information: Public file; LMS
- Webcast: Listen live (via Audacy); Listen live (via Audacy) (HD3)
- Website: audacy.com/thebull

KILT-FM (100.3 FM, "The Bull 100.3") is a commercial radio station licensed to Houston, Texas, United States. Owned by Audacy, Inc., it airs a country format with studios in Greenway Plaza in Southwest Houston. KILT-FM serves as a co-flagship radio station of the Houston Texans football team, along with co-owned KIKK-FM and KIKK.

KILT-FM has an effective radiated power (ERP) of 100,000 watts, the highest permitted for non-grandfathered FM stations in the U.S. The transmitter is off Farm to Market Road 2234 near Fort Bend Parkway in Southwest Houston. KILT-FM broadcasts in HD Radio; the HD-2 subchannel carries a Texas country music format.

== History ==
=== McLendon origins ===
In July 1961, noted radio programmer and owner Gordon McLendon signed on an FM station at 100.3 MHz as the sister station to popular Top 40 station KILT (610 AM). The station originally had the call sign KOST and it carried an easy listening format.

The call letters were changed to KZAP in November 1967, shortly before McLendon sold his Houston properties to LIN Broadcasting. (McLendon moved the KOST call letters to his property in Los Angeles.)

=== FM 100 KILT Rock ===
Upon assuming control of KILT and KZAP in 1968, LIN changed the FM station's call letters to KILT-FM. KILT-FM began playing Top 40 music, similar to the successful AM station. But in the late 1960s the Federal Communications Commission began encouraging AM-FM combos to offer separate programming on each station. In the early 1970s, KILT-FM adopted a free-form progressive rock format while "The Big 610" KILT continued with its long-running Top 40 format.

KILT-FM was staffed with young disc jockeys who chose the music for their shows and had the freedom to discuss pop culture and current events during their programs. The station went by the slogan "Radio Montrose", named for the neighborhood in which the station's studios were located. By 1974, the station evolved to a more structured album rock format as "FM 100".

=== FM 100 KILT Country ===
KILT-FM flipped to country music on February 16, 1981. When KILT AM switched to country as well on June 1, 1981, its long-running Hudson and Harrigan morning show remained and began to be simulcast on KILT-FM. The rest of the day, the AM had more talk and information and it played some classic country titles along with current songs, while KILT-FM was more contemporary and had its DJs avoid too much chatter.

From its debut in 1967 through 1995, the Hudson and Harrigan morning show had eleven different sets of personalities occupying the personas of Mac Hudson and Irv Harrigan. The show's title remained, regardless of the DJs who staffed the program. Ken Hoffmann of the Houston Chronicle described Hudson and Harrigan as "the longest-running, most successful morning team anywhere in America". In 1994, KILT AM switched to sports radio, leaving Hudson and Harrigan on KILT-FM only.

Their run finally ended when KILT-FM announced the show's termination on March 23, 2010. Fred Olson and Randy Hames, who hosted as Hudson and Harrigan for the last 28 years, were released. Longtime KILT-FM afternoon personality Rowdy Yates, Erin Austin, and Cowboy Dave were subsequently named the new morning show hosts.

After switching to country, KILT-FM competed directly against KIKK-FM, the other major FM country music station in Houston. According to the Houston Chronicle, "after initial success, KILT-FM struggled through an aborted change of call letters (KXAS-FM in 1984) and the lack of a strong identity with listeners". In the spring of 1989, KILT-FM finally pulled ahead of KIKK-FM in the Arbitron ratings. KIKK-FM maintained the lead position for the next two ratings periods, and at the end of the year, Radio and Records magazine rated KILT-FM as the second most-listened-to country radio station in the United States in terms of market share. It had an estimated 542,600 listeners tuned in for at least 15 minutes each week. KIKK-FM was fourth on the nationwide list, with an estimated 508,700 listeners.

=== "The Bull" ===
On January 10, 2013, at 5 p.m., after playing "Give It All We Got Tonight" by George Strait, the station relaunched as "The Bull @ 100.3". The station shifted its playlist to include more current and recent music, avoiding most hits recorded before 2000. The first song on "The Bull" was "Drink in My Hand" by Eric Church.

In December 2024, the station axed the three hosts of its "Morning Bullpen" show in a cost-cutting move.

=== Ownership changes ===
KILT-AM-FM had been owned by LIN Broadcasting Corporation since 1968. In an effort to divest itself of all of its radio stations, in late 1986, LIN Broadcasting Corporation sold KILT and KILT-FM to Legacy Broadcasting Inc. for $36.75 million. Less than three years later, KILT-AM-FM were sold, along with seven other radio stations, by Metropolitan-Legacy to Westinghouse Broadcasting. At the time, the $360 million deal was considered the largest ever in radio. To meet federal regulations on radio ownership, Westinghouse sold its Houston station 99.1 KODA.

In 1993, Westinghouse purchased KILT-FM's country rival, KIKK-FM, as well as KIKK (650 AM). At the time, KILT-FM was first in the Arbitron ratings, with KIKK-FM second in the Houston market. A single general manager was assigned to run both stations. According to Dan Mason, president of Westinghouse Radio Broadcasting, "'As they have been fierce competitors in the past, our two Houston radio properties will now join hands to create one of Houston's most unique country music powerhouses, each with its own programming and sales team.'" On November 4, 2002, KIKK-FM stopped playing country music and switched to a smooth jazz format as KHJZ (it has since reverted to KIKK-FM, now airing 610 AM's sports format). This left KILT-FM as again one of only two Houston country stations (competing against KKBQ-FM owned by Clear Channel Communications). Some of the KIKK-FM promotions, including the 10 Man Jam concerts, were moved to KILT-FM.

KILT-FM was the last Houston FM radio station to maintain a full-service news department. The department was disbanded in 2004 when KILT-FM dropped its afternoon newscasts to go with a more-music approach.

On February 2, 2017, CBS Radio announced it would merge with Entercom. The merger was approved on November 9, 2017, and was consummated on November 17.
