= KIKK =

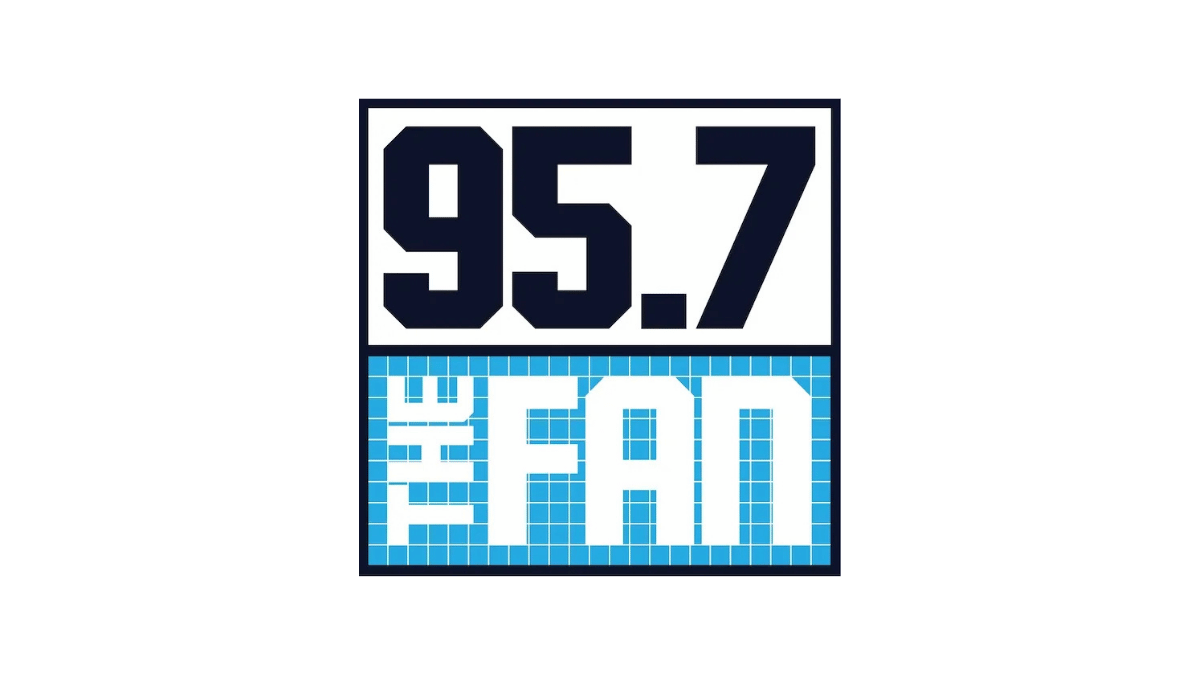
- Houston, Texas; United States
- Broadcast area: Greater Houston
- Frequency: 610 kHz
- Branding: 95.7 The Fan

Programming
- Language: English
- Format: Sports radio
- Affiliations: Westwood One Sports; Houston Dynamo; Houston Texans; Sports USA Radio Network

Ownership
- Owner: Audacy, Inc.; (Audacy License, LLC)
- Sister stations: KHMX; KIKK-FM; KILT; KILT-FM; KLOL

History
- First air date: January 31, 1948
- Former call signs: KLEE (1948–1952); KLBS (1952–1957); KILT (1957–2026)
- Call sign meaning: "Kick" (former country format branding of 650 AM)

Technical information
- Licensing authority: FCC
- Facility ID: 25440
- Class: B
- Power: 2,700 watts
- Transmitter coordinates: 29°55′4″N 95°25′33″W
- Repeater: 95.7 KIKK-FM (Houston)

Links
- Public license information: Public file; LMS
- Webcast: Listen live (via Audacy)
- Website: www.audacy.com/957thefan

KIKK (610 AM, "95.7 The Fan") is a commercial radio station licensed to serve Houston, Texas, owned by Audacy, Inc. The station airs a sports radio format, as the flagship of both the Houston Texans and Houston Dynamo FC, and is an affiliate of Westwood One Sports. Its studios are located in the Greenway Plaza district.

The station's transmitter is on Welcome Lane near T.C. Jester Boulevard in Houston. Programming is also heard on FM sister station KIKK-FM.

== History ==
=== KLEE ===
The station signed on the air on January 31, 1948. It was owned by W. Albert Lee, and chose the call sign KLEE to reflect his name. The studios were in the Milby Hotel, which Lee owned.

The following year, Lee added a television station, KLEE-TV (channel 2). It was Houston's first television station and the second one in Texas. Lee sold KLEE-TV to the Hobby family in 1950, owners of the Houston Post daily newspaper, but he kept his radio station since the Post already owned KPRC (950 AM); the television station became KPRC-TV.

=== Gordon McLendon ownership ===
In 1952, KLEE was sold to Gordon McLendon, who initially changed the call letters to KLBS, to represent his network, the "Liberty Broadcasting System." McLendon had great success programming Top 40 hits on KLIF in Dallas. That prompted McLendon to turn other stations in his chain into Top 40 outlets, including AM 610 in Houston, in 1957.

The station took the call letters KILT as a nod to McLendon, who often called himself "The Old Scotsman" on the air. (Scottish men are known for wearing kilts instead of pants.) For 24 years, KILT was the leading Top 40 station in Houston, called "The Big 610 KILT". It used PAMS jingles that featured the call letters being sung out over the air. Notable personalities in the 1960s and 1970s included Steve Lundy, Sheila Mayhew, Beau Weaver, Butch Brady, Jay West, K.O. Bailey, Barry Kaye, Captain Jack and others.

=== Flip to country ===
On February 16, 1981, sister station KILT-FM dropped album rock for country during the "Urban Cowboy" craze that swept through Houston, and the United States in general. The AM station continued with its adult Top 40 format. However, in the 1980s, young listeners were increasingly tuning in FM stations to hear their favorite hits. Competition from KRBE (104.1 FM) and KRLY (93.7 FM) prompted KILT to end its Top 40 format.

On June 1, 1981, KILT switched to country music, partially simulcasting KILT-FM, then known as "FM 100". Over time, KILT played more classic country titles among current and recent hits, while KILT-FM concentrated on current country music. KILT AM included more news and features while KILT-FM stressed its more-music approach. In addition, the morning show was heard on both stations.

In 1989, KILT-AM-FM were acquired by Westinghouse Broadcasting. Westinghouse kept KILT as an AM country station for another five years. As AM radio declined as a source for music, management decided to make a change.

=== SportsRadio 610 ===
KILT debuted a sports talk format in September 1994. The moniker for the new format was "Star 610 SportsRadio KILT". The initial hosts were Mike Edmonds & Ed Fowler in the afternoon from 4-7 p.m. and the Bob Stevenson Outdoors Show, airing Tuesday-Friday mornings 4 am-5 am and Saturdays & Sundays from 4 am-7 am. Prime Sports Radio, based in Dallas, aired for all other hours.

In 1995, Edmonds & Fowler moved to the mornings 6 am-9 am and Rich Lord & Kenny Hand were paired together for "Section 610" from 4 pm-7 pm. Lord & Hand also alternated hosting duties for the locally produced Astros Clubhouse Extra post-game shows from 1996 to 1998. KILT also became one of Jim Rome's most prominent affiliates in the mid & late 1990s. At one point, between 1996-1999 KILT aired Rome's show twice a day, live at 11 am, and then replayed at night at 7 pm. KILT's local sports talk programming was expanded in the late 1990s as Nate Griffin, Lance Zierlein, John Granato, Tony Ortiz (as of 2024 at WWJ in Detroit), Michael P. Davis, Adam Wexler, Russ Small, Jeremy Foster and Matt Jackson all joined the station for various timeslots. The network affiliation was also changed from Prime Sports to Chicago-based One on One Sports.

In 2001, KILT signed a 10-year agreement with the expansion Houston Texans of the NFL to become their first-ever flagship radio station when the team began play in 2002. Marc Vandermeer was hired as the Voice of the Texans and was also added to the roster of station hosts. Vandermeer teamed with former Heisman Trophy winner Andre Ware on the game broadcasts and Lord, along with his new co-host in afternoon drive, Charlie Pallillo, served as co-host of the Texans first-ever pre-game and post-game shows. In 2007, Lord moved on to a new role, serving seven seasons as the Texans in-game sideline reporter before giving way to John Harris.

=== Entercom ownership ===
On February 2, 2017, CBS Radio announced it would merge with Entercom. The merger was approved on November 9, 2017, and was consummated on November 17.

KILT has remained Houston's top rated sports station for most of its history. Co-owned KIKK (650 AM) carried the CBS Sports Radio in the daytime until 2021 when it made the switch to sports gambling as "The Bet", airing programming from the BetMGM Network, while KILT concentrates on local sports shows.

KILT added an FM simulcast on August 13, 2026, replacing the adult hits format of "95.7 The Spot" KKHH, which rebranded as "95.7 The Fan". After the format switchover, the callsigns for 610 and 95.7 changed to KIKK (swapping with 650 AM) and KIKK-FM respectively.

== Notable personalities ==
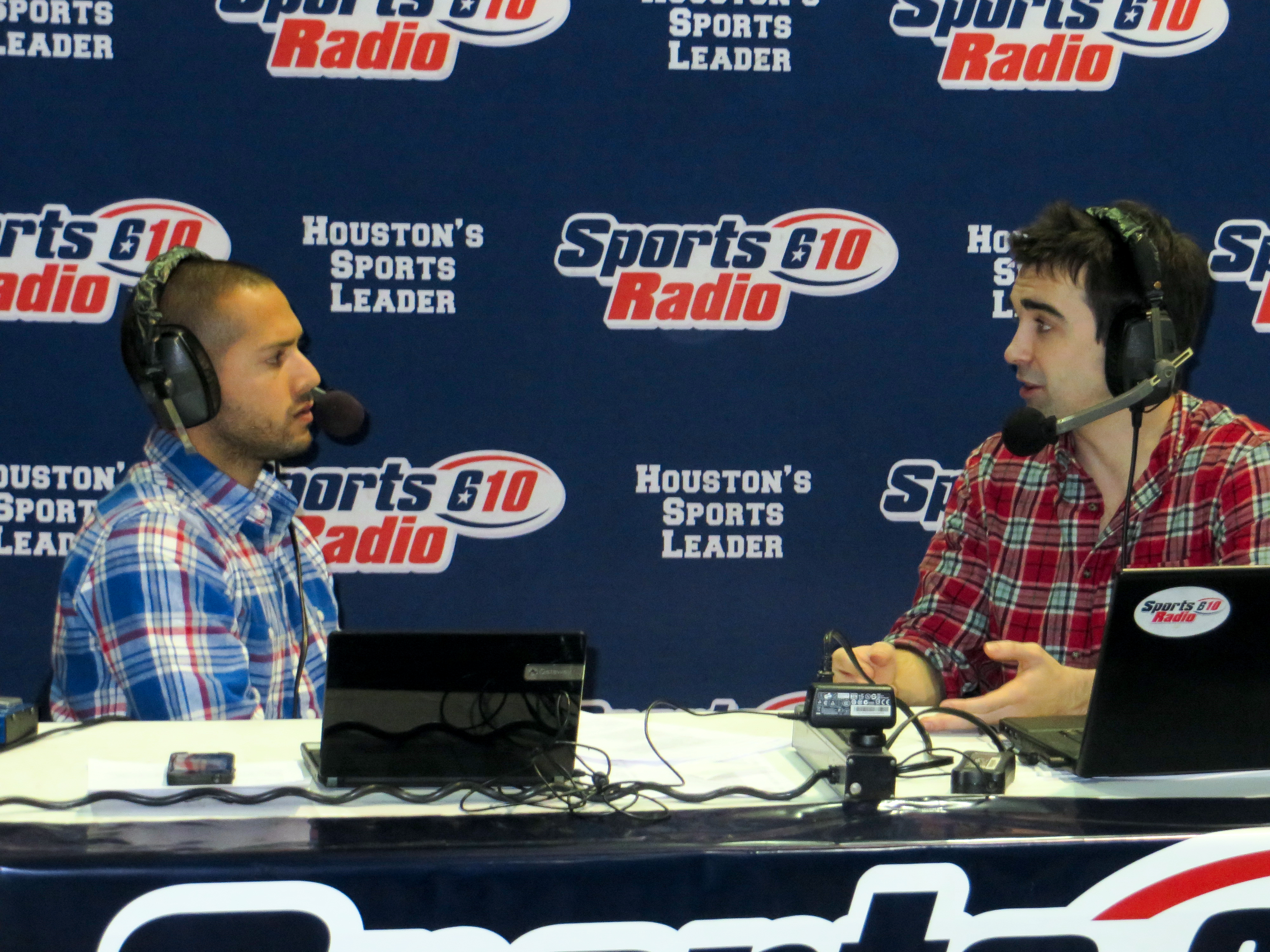
Shaun Bijani (left) and Paul Gallant airing live from a sports collectors show in Houston.

- Ted Johnson, former host & 3x Super Bowl Champion with New England Patriots
- Rick Kamla, former co-host of Clint and Kamla
- John McClain, former host and Hall of Fame NFL Sportswriter
- Jim Nantz, contributor to The Drive with Stoerner and Hughley
- Wade Smith, guest host and former Houston Texans OL
- Clint Stoerner, host of The Drive with Stoerner & Hughley & former Dallas Cowboys QB
- Booker T, former host & 2x WWE Hall of Famer
- Nick Wright, former host
