= KLTH =

Radio station in Lake Oswego–Portland, Oregon

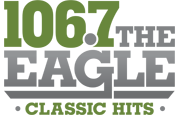
- Lake Oswego, Oregon; United States
- Broadcast area: Portland, Oregon
- Frequency: 106.7 MHz (HD Radio)
- Branding: 106.7 The Eagle

Programming
- Format: Classic hits
- Subchannels: HD2: KEX simulcast (news/talk)
- Affiliations: Premiere Networks; KATU-TV (weather)

Ownership
- Owner: iHeartMedia, Inc.; (iHM Licenses, LLC)
- Sister stations: KEX, KFBW, KKCW, KKRZ, KPOJ, KXJM

History
- First air date: September 15, 1972
- Former call signs: KQIV (1972–1977); KMJK (1977–1991); KMXI (1991–1993); KKBK (1993–1994); KKJZ (1994–2002)
- Call sign meaning: "K-Lite" (former branding)

Technical information
- Licensing authority: FCC
- Facility ID: 4115
- Class: C
- ERP: 100,000 watts
- HAAT: 502 meters (1,647 ft)
- Transmitter coordinates: 45°30′57.4″N 122°44′3.4″W

Links
- Public license information: Public file; LMS
- Webcast: Listen live (via iHeartRadio)
- Website: 1067theeagle.iheart.com

KLTH (106.7 MHz "The Eagle") is a commercial FM radio station, licensed to Lake Oswego, Oregon, and serving the Portland metropolitan area. It is owned by iHeartMedia, Inc., and airs a classic hits radio format. Specialty programs on KLTH include Casey Kasem's "American Top 40: The 70s" on Saturday mornings and "American Top 40: The 80s" on Sunday mornings. Sundays also feature "Yacht Rock".

KLTH's studios and offices are located on SW 68th Parkway in Tigard, Oregon. The transmitter is located on SW Barnes Road in the Tualatin Mountains. KLTH covers much of Northwestern Oregon and Southwestern Washington.

== History ==
=== KQIV ===
The station signed on for the first time at 10:15 p.m. on September 15, 1972, as KQIV. It was a short-lived but popular progressive rock station. KQIV was owned and operated by Willamette Broadcasting Company, Inc., with Walter J. M. Kraus serving as president. The station also called itself "KQ4" and "FM 107".

The original KQIV offices and studios were located at the Lake Oswego Elks Lodge (#2263). Members of this historically conservative organization frequently crossed paths with the station's hippie disc jockeys and creative staff.

The KQIV transmitter was located between Oregon City and Carver. An American Electronic Laboratories (AEL) FM-25KD transmitter fed 24,000 watts into a Jampro JSCP eight element antenna yielding an effective radiated power (ERP) of 100,000 watts. The antenna was mounted on a 200-foot tower based at an elevation of 800 feet in height above average terrain (HAAT).

Both the "Q" and "IV" in the station's call sign alluded to four-channel quadraphonic sound. KQIV was reported in the local press to be the second quadraphonic radio station in the world and the first to be designed and built to be quadraphonic,, though the station's promotional efforts were ahead of what turned out to be a reality where its intended system would never come to air. KQIV established its quadraphonic identity and "Rockin' in Quad" branding in anticipation of being selected as the exclusive FM station in the Portland radio market to field test the Dorren Quadraplex System, invented by audio engineer Louis Dorren. About a month before KQIV went on the air, the FCC suspended further testing of Quadraplex due to a concern that the system used an unregulated subcarrier component which was not permitted by the commission.

Despite the setback, KQIV continued to identify itself as a quadraphonic station in the hope that Quadraplex testing eventually would be permitted. Meanwhile, the station broadcast music from phonograph records encoded in various quadraphonic matrix formats.

In 1974, operation of KQIV was turned over to Brotherhood Broadcasting Company, with Roy Jay as president. Brotherhood changed the station's music format to urban contemporary, branded as "Soul 107". In 1975, the KQIV offices and studios were moved to Milwaukie. Its ratings failed to improve, and its quadrophonic intentions were eventually abandoned as continuing financial difficulties led to the court-ordered liquidation of KQIV, which went off the air on June 18, 1976.

=== KMJK ===
KQIV remained silent for nearly 14 months. On August 1, 1977, Communico Northwest Corp. began operating the station, using the same license as KQIV. The call sign switched to KMJK, using the moniker "Magic 107" and playing soft rock. The offices and studios moved to "Magic Manor" in Lake Oswego and the transmitter was relocated to Portland.

On June 29, 1979, KMJK changed its format to Top 40, but still called "Magic 107". The contemporary hit format failed to catch on, and in July 1981, KMJK changed back to soft adult contemporary music, still using the "Magic 107" moniker. In August 1982, KMJK switched back to Top 40, while retaining the "Magic 107" name. On April 13, 1987, at 6 a.m., after a 12-hour stunt, KMJK changed its format to classic hits, now calling itself "Classic Hits 106.7". On September 1, 1989, KMJK shifted its format to classic rock, calling itself "Classic Rock 106.7". On February 19, 1990, KMJK changed to hot adult contemporary as "106.7 Magic FM".

=== KMXI, KKBK and KKJZ ===
On January 25, 1991, the station rebranded and changed call letters to "Mix 106" KMXI, while continuing its hot AC format. On December 30, 1991, KMXI changed its format to oldies as "Oldies 106.7".

In 1993, KMXI was bought by BayCom Partners for $2.6 million. On July 7, 1993, 106.7 flipped to classical music as "K-Bach" KKBK. While the format was popular with mostly older listeners, the station struggled to attract advertisers.

In less than a year, management decided to try a different unique format that was catching on in many cities, smooth jazz. On March 17, 1994, the station became KKJZ, and rebranded as "Smooth Jazz 106.7".

=== KLTH ===
In 1998, KKJZ was acquired by Infinity Broadcasting, which later was merged into CBS Radio. On February 1, 2002, CBS changed the station's call sign to KLTH, and flipped back to soft AC as "Lite Rock 106.7, K-Lite".

On January 9, 2006, KLTH changed its format to 1960s and 1970s oldies as "106.7 K-Hits". Over time, KLTH expanded its scope to cover the 1980s as well. Its competition was adult hits KYCH, which was previously KKSN, Portland's outlet for the oldies format prior to KLTH's debut. The debut of “K-Hits” was quite successful, capitalizing on the oldies/classic hits vacuum left by KKSN. Programmed by Dennis Constantine and Creative Imaging by John Hugill, K-Hits was a top 3 contender until KQOL changed to classic hits and competed directly.

On April 1, 2009, CBS Radio sold KLTH to Clear Channel Communications along with KXJM. The sale made KLTH and KQOL sister stations. Both co-existed until May 6, 2009, when KQOL flipped to classic rock as KFBW. Previous KQOL listeners were redirected to KLTH, which aired the message "Welcome 105.9 listeners." Weekend specialty programs on KLTH included "Saturday Night Fever", a weekly classic disco show.

Shortly after the move, on August 17, 2009, the name was changed to "Oldies 106.7" with a logo identical to CBS Radio's WODS in Boston. This was later replaced by a more modern logo. In the May 2011 Arbitron PPMs, KLTH became the number one station in the Portland area radio rankings, overtaking the market's usual top station, co-owned KKCW, which plays adult contemporary music.

On August 1, 2014, at 5 p.m., KLTH shifted its format to classic hits and rebranded as "106.7 The Eagle". Most listeners did not notice much of a change, since KLTH had already been cutting back 1960s titles and focusing mostly on the 70s and 80s hits.

== KLTH-HD2 ==
In 2010, KLTH began broadcasting in the HD Radio format. On June 4, 2010, KLTH-HD2 signed on a 1950s-1960s oldies format branded as "Real Oldies". On April 17, 2015, KLTH-HD2 switched to iHeartMedia's "My 60s" format, featuring the hits of the 1960s (now known as "iHeart '60s").

== KLTH-HD3 ==
In December 2018 KLTH began airing "The Breeze" soft adult contemporary format on its HD3 subchannel. It has since been removed.
