= KKPZ =

Radio station in Portland, Oregon

- Portland, Oregon; United States
- Frequency: 1330 kHz (HD Radio)

Ownership
- Owner: Crawford Broadcasting; (KPHP Radio, Inc.)

History
- First air date: September 25, 1925
- Last air date: April 30, 2021
- Former call signs: KTBR (1925–1932); KALE (1932–1948); KPOJ (1948–1970); KPOK (1970–1976); KUPL (1976–1995)
- Former frequencies: 1140 kHz (1925–27); 1060 kHz (1927–28); 1310 kHz (1928); 1300 kHz (1928–41)
- Call sign meaning: "Praise"

Technical information
- Facility ID: 4113
- Class: B
- Power: 5,000 watts (unlimited)
- Transmitter coordinates: 45°27′13″N 122°32′45″W
- Translator: 97.5 K248DD (Portland)

KKPZ (1330 AM, "The Truth") was a radio station broadcasting a religious radio format. Licensed to Portland, Oregon, United States, it served the greater Portland metro area. The station was owned by KPHP Radio, Inc. (Crawford Broadcasting Company), located in Happy Valley, Oregon.

== History ==
The station was first licensed on September 21, 1925, as KTBR on 1140 kHz, to Brown's Radio Shop at 172 Tenth Street in Portland.

In 1932, the station (then broadcasting on 1330 kHz with 500 watts of power) was purchased by the management of KOIN, and the call letters were changed to KALE. A story in a trade publication noted that KALE "will broadcast CBS sustaining features which KOIN cannot handle." The station's call letters were changed to KPOJ effective June 6, 1948, the date on which sister station KPOJ-FM began broadcasting. The stations were owned and operated by The Oregon Journal.

On June 9, 1970, KPOJ changed callsigns to KPOK and switched to a "Pop Tunes and Oldies" format. On January 24, 1972, KPOK switched from "Pop Tunes and Oldies" to oldies as "The Golden Sound". On June 18, 1973, KPOK switched from oldies "The Golden Sound" to "Cross-Country" (a mixture of modern country and top hits). On August 16, 1976, KPOK changed call letters to KUPL and switched from "Rockin' Country" to beautiful music and later to adult standards. KUPL became a "Music of Your Life" adult standards station in 1980. In 1984, KUPL switched to a country format.

On November 1, 1995, KUPL changed its callsign to KKPZ and changed to a religious format.

KKPZ ceased broadcasting on April 30, 2021. Crawford Broadcasting put KKPZ and FM translator station 97.5 K248DD up for sale, but KKPZ's license was cancelled by the Federal Communications Commission on September 28, 2021. Due to that, K248DD started simulcasting KLVP. The property was sold for development into multi-family housing.
