= K275CH =

FM station translator in Gresham, Oregon

Translator for KINK-HD2
- Gresham, Oregon; United States
- Broadcast area: Portland metropolitan area
- Frequency: 102.9 MHz
- Branding: 102.9 KUFO

Programming
- Format: Active Rock

Ownership
- Owner: Connoisseur Media; (Alpha Media Licensee LLC)
- Sister stations: KBFF; KINK; KUFO; KUPL; KXL-FM; KXTG

History
- First air date: 1998; 28 years ago
- Former call signs: K273AB (1994–2001); K274AR (2001–2015)
- Call sign meaning: 102.5 MHz (1998–2001); 102.7 MHz (2001–2015)

Technical information
- Licensing authority: FCC
- Facility ID: 60147
- Class: D
- ERP: 99 watts
- HAAT: 198 meters (650 ft)
- Transmitter coordinates: 45°31′20.4″N 122°44′59.4″W

Links
- Public license information: Public file; LMS
- Webcast: Listen live; Listen live (via iHeartRadio)
- Website: www.1029kufo.com

K275CH (102.9 MHz) is an American commercial FM radio station translator licensed to Gresham, Oregon, and broadcasting to the Portland metropolitan area. The station, billed as "102.9 KUFO", is owned and operated by Connoisseur Media, which owns six full-strength radio stations in the Portland market.

K275CH's studios and offices are in the Connoisseur Media studios located in the PacWest Center on Southwest Fifth Avenue in Portland. The transmitter is located off Southwest Fairmount Boulevard, amid other Portland-area FM and TV towers. K275CH broadcasts at only 99 watts while many Portland-area FM stations operate at 100,000 watts. Because the tower is 198 meters (650 feet) height above average terrain, a bit less than the Empire State Building, the station's signal is limited over Portland and its nearby suburbs in Oregon and Washington.

== History ==
K275CH signed on at 102.5 FM in 1998, and repeated contemporary Christian programming from the K-Love network. It would later shift to 102.7 FM in 2001. In 2014, Alpha Media began programming the translator and flipped it to a simulcast of KXTG; the following year, the translator would shift frequencies again to 102.9 FM.

The "WE" intellectual property began on August 1, 2016, at 5 p.m., when Alpha Media began operating KWLZ-FM (96.3 FM) under a local marketing agreement with 3 Horizons, and flipped the station's format to Rhythmic CHR, branded as "WE 96-3". The station changed its call sign to KWEE on August 12, 2016.

On June 4, 2019, 3 Horizons LLC sold KWEE to WAY-FM Network, whose Christian AC programming was also heard on K283BL via iHeartMedia's KFBW-HD2. The sale also ended its LMA with Alpha Media, as WAY-FM moved the Christian AC format to KWEE on October 3, 2019.

On September 16, 2019, Alpha began transitioning KWEE's format to 102.9, replacing the KXTG simulcast, relaunching as "WE 102.9." The transition was completed on October 3.

Effective April 25, 2022, Alpha Media acquired the license for K275CH from Educational Media Foundation in exchange for KHHL. Alpha Media merged with Connoisseur Media on September 4, 2025.

At approximately 10:51 p.m. on February 1, 2026, after playing "Nokia" by Drake, K275CH and KINK-HD2 both began stunting with a loop of "I Got You Babe" by Sonny & Cher (a nod to the following day being Groundhog Day, more specifically its famous use in the film of the same name), promoting that changes would be "coming soon". The following day, the stunt shifted to a loop of the Star Wars theme as orchestrated by John Williams and the London Symphony Orchestra; with this, the station's social media would join in on the stunt, claiming the stunt was counting down to a "re-establishing connection to the 102.9 coordinate” to take place February 5 at Midnight; the use of extraterrestrial-focused references was itself a reference to reports the station would flip to rock music in some form, reviving the KUFO brand that had been used on what is now KXL-FM until 2011. This would indeed be the case, as the station would indeed flip to active rock as "102.9 KUFO" on February 4 at 1 a.m., 23 hours ahead of the reported date; befitting the "UFO" theme, the first song under the relaunched brand was "Intergalactic" by The Beastie Boys.
