= KXL =

KXL may refer to:

- KXL-FM, a radio station (101.1 FM) licensed to serve Portland, Oregon, United States
- KXTG, a radio station (750 AM) licensed to serve Portland, Oregon, United States, known as KXL until 2011
- Keystone XL, an oil pipeline system meant to transport crude oil from Canada to Texas.
- Corneal collagen cross-linking, also known as KXL
