= KUFO (disambiguation) =

KUFO may refer to:

- KUFO, a radio station (970 AM) licensed to Portland, Oregon, United States
- KGBC, a radio station (101.7 FM) licensed to Galveston, Texas, United States, which used the call sign KUFO from 1974 to 1979
- KODM, a radio station (97.9 FM) licensed to Odessa, Texas, United States, which used the call sign KUFO from 1979 to 1985
- KMMX, a radio station (100.3 FM) licensed to Tahoka, Texas, United States, which used the call sign KUFO from 1985 to 1989
- KXL-FM, a radio station (101.1 FM) licensed to Portland, Oregon, United States, which used the call signs KUFO and KUFO-FM from 1990 to 2011
