= NBG =

NBG may refer to:

- Namibian Black German, a pidgin variant of the German language native to Namibia
- Natal Border Guard, a military unit of the Colony of Natal during the Anglo-Zulu War
- National Bank of Georgia
- National Bank of Greece
- Naval Air Station Joint Reserve Base New Orleans, by IATA airport code
- NBG Radio Network, defunct American radio network based in Portland, Oregon
- von Neumann–Bernays–Gödel set theory in mathematics
- Nibong LRT station, Singapore, by LRT station abbreviation
- Nordic Battle Group
- North Bengal Grey cattle
- Nuremberg, a city in Bavaria, Germany
- Non-binary gender, a gender identity (also abbreviated as "NB")
- Natural burial ground, a cemetery dedicated to natural burial
- Bible Society for the Netherlands and Flanders (Nederlands-Vlaams Bijbelgenootschap)
