= Rick Emerson =

Radio, television personality (born 1973)

- Born: March 7, 1973 (age 53); Kennewick, Washington, U.S.
- Presenting career
- Show: Outlook Portland (former) Legion of News (former) The Rick Emerson Show
- Station: NW 32 TV (Outlook Portland)
- Time slot: Sundays 6:00am-6:30am (Outlook Portland) (Former) Monday - Friday 12pm-1pm (LoN); Monday-Friday 1pm-3pm or later (Rick Emerson Show)
- Style: Talk
- Country: United States
- Website: www.rickemerson.com

Rick Emerson (born March 7, 1973), formerly known as Rick Taylor, is a radio personality most known for The Rick Emerson Show, which was broadcast from Portland, Oregon, in one form or another, from 1997 to 2012. Emerson also co-hosted Drive-By Radio as "Rick Taylor" in Salt Lake City. He hosted the public affairs television show Outlook Portland, and is the author of two books: Zombie Economics: A Guide to Personal Finance (2011, co-authored with Lisa Desjardins) and Unmask Alice: LSD, Satanic Panic, and the Imposter Behind the World's Most Notorious Diaries (2022). On January 2, 2012, Emerson announced his retirement from the broadcasting industry.

== Early life ==
Rick Emerson was born March 7, 1973, in Kennewick, Washington. He was interested in radio from a very young age. He used a RadioShack tape recorder to interview his friends. "I was like a Larry King in short pants." At age 14 he began volunteering at a local radio station. After graduating fourth-to-last in his high school class, he moved to Spokane, Washington, where he landed his first radio talk show. He broadcast weeknights from midnight to 2 a.m from a bomb shelter in the basement of the station's building. "It was just hours of me talking to NO ONE," he said. "The only calls I got were wrong numbers." During this time, he managed to earn a small but loyal following. Listeners knew him by the stage name "Rick Taylor", the last name that he picked out of a phone-book. During this time, Emerson was arrested when pulled over for a broken tail-light; a bench warrant had been issued after he forgot to pay the last $10 on a traffic ticket.

== Drive-By Radio ==
In January 1995, Emerson was hired by KCNR in Salt Lake City, where he co-hosted the afternoon drive show Drive-By Radio with Clyde Lewis. In Salt Lake City, as in Spokane, Emerson worked under the stage name "Rick Taylor". Salt Lake City Weekly described Rick Taylor as "everything a talk radio fan under 50 could ask for: Confrontational, funny, smart, vaguely liberal, pop-culture obsessed and driven to Get Your Attention! like no one before or since on SLC's airwaves." He became program director of KCNR and helped create one of the most popular radio stations in Utah. Journalist Bill Frost later wrote: "From January 1995 to November 1996, KCNR AM 1320 (later 860) brought the Salt Lake Valley the most in-your-face, vibrant, talk-radio format it had ever heard. Rick Taylor, Martin Davies, Todd Herman, and Clyde Lewis took back the airwaves from the old guard of creaky conspiratorialists and political pontificators and, at least in small part, introduced it to a younger, hipper audience. It was rock & roll radio without the music, and what they accomplished in such a short period of time is still talked about to this day."

In November 1996, KCNR was sold to Radio Disney, leaving Emerson without a microphone. According to his semi-biography Bigger Than Jesus, he found out about KCNR's new programming when he tuned in one morning while getting ready for work and found it playing music followed by Radio Disney liners. His former KCNR co-worker Todd Herman recalled the dire financial straits of this post-firing period: "We were literally, swear to God, asking for credit at the convenience store." Emerson then moved to San Diego, where he worked as a convenience store clerk. In November 1997, Emerson was offered a job at KOTK in Portland, Oregon, and The Rick Emerson Show was born.

== The Rick Emerson Show ==
The Rick Emerson Show was a conversational style radio talk show broadcast from Portland, Oregon from 1997 to 2012. The show's most enduring lineup featured Rick, Sarah X Dylan and news reporter Tim Riley. They were joined by regulars Matt "F Matt" Peterson, Kyle the Intern, Jolie from Corporate Accounts Payable, and Kristin from Accounting, as well as frequent guests like Aaron Geek in the City, film reviewer Dawn Taylor, Jen Lane of Barfly Magazine, Scott Dally of filmfever.org, and Ground Zero host Clyde Lewis (Rick's former Drive-By Radio co-host). They would chat about (and skewer and dismantle) pop culture topics like music, movies, television, tech, celebrities, and news and politics. They would also talk about their own social lives and the local Portland scene. Emerson would at times launch into a rant against some particularly bothersome aspect of modern society; other times he would rant in favor of what he likes, as in his "PDX Rant" about why he loves the city of Portland. In December 2007, the show presented the live radio play Ebenezer? I Barely Knew Her!, a modern-day take-off on A Christmas Carol. The show hosted listener events such as a Halloween party where everyone dressed as a dead celebrity. House band The Tim Riley Factor performed at live events. The band included Emerson, Sarah X Dylan and Kristin from Accounting (but not Tim Riley). The Rick Emerson Show attracted a loyal audience that journalist (and show guest) Peter Ames Carlin called "almost unnervingly enthusiastic." Kristi Turnquist of The Oregonian described Emerson's style as a "distinctive blend of arcane references, multisyllabic vocabulary and mythic grasp of old TV shows." And Mark Baumgarten of Willamette Week described Emerson as "brash, uncompromisingly geeky, smart, occasionally completely off the mark and funny."

=== History ===
In November 1997, Bruce Agler, program director for KOTK 1080 AM, offered Emerson a job in Portland, Oregon. After Emerson was on-air in Portland for only a few months, he was offered national syndication with the NBG Radio Network. Emerson hosted his nationally syndicated show for three years until he was again fired. Emerson was rehired by KOTK in the summer of 2001, and was soon paired with news reporter Tim Riley. Mixed with a series of producers, Emerson was finally paired with Sarah X Dylan in December 2002, who served as producer and eventual co-host.

Emerson's program and cast were often subject to the fluctuations of the Portland radio market, and there were periods when the show was off the air. First was the "unpleasantness" that occurred between Emerson's syndicated show and his transition back to KOTK's Hot Talk 1080. A second gap occurred after the show moved to MAX 910 AM. The station, owned by Entercom, was switched without warning to an oldies music format. Rick Emerson Show fans launched the "Coffee Cup Crusade." They deluged the Portland headquarters of Entercom with coffee cups, each with the message: "I need my morning fix. Bring back Rick Emerson."

CBS Radio, reacting in part to the strength of support for Emerson throughout the Portland metro area, decided to give Emerson an opportunity to retool Johnson AM 970, an all-comedy radio station. Broadcasting from "the plushly appointed but not overly ostentatious studios high atop the bottom of the KOIN tower," Emerson was back on the air with Tim Riley and producer Sarah X. Dylan. Within months, the station was retooled as "AM 970, Solid State Radio" and took on a lineup of syndicated broadcasts from around the country, including Tom Leykis and Phil Hendrie, both of those programs had been previously paired with Emerson on other stations. Emerson's fans were loyal, as evidenced by a May 2008 listener party where friends of his show and listeners held a roast in his honor. Under Emerson's leadership, KCMD 970 AM became a talk powerhouse, and changed its name to "The Talker" in mid-2008. After a seven-year run with the show, Tim Riley was laid off in December 2008 when CBS Portland went through a series of staff reductions. In order to continue featuring news on the show, Emerson invited many other laid-off Portland media personalities to fill in for Riley.

In March 2009, The Rick Emerson Show moved from AM 970's midday slot to sister station 101.1 FM KUFO's morning slot. Tim Riley returned as a news reporter, and Greg Nibler joined the show. As part of the move, Emerson would no longer be program director; that job instead went to KUFO program director Chris Patyk. The transition to KUFO was bumpy. "We were like the boyfriend who's so appealing to his girlfriend until they move in together," Emerson said. "Once they had us they realized everything about us had to be made over." In August 2009, CBS Radio sold KUFO to the Portland-based radio conglomerate Alpha Broadcasting. On October 23, 2009, Alpha Broadcasting canceled The Rick Emerson Show as well as the afternoon show Cort and Fatboy, and fired program director Chris Patyk. In a blog post to fans on his website, Emerson asked them to "please forgo the gathering of coffee cups," alluding to the previous "Coffee Cup Crusade."

=== Internet Broadcasting ===
From 2010 to 2012, The Rick Emerson Show was broadcast as a subscription-based online program on RickEmerson.com. According to Emerson, this enabled the subscribers/listeners to be in control of the show, instead of corporations that didn't get the show and only saw it as a line item on a budget. He was also the host of Legion of News (LoN), available on Cascadia.fm (formerly PDX.FM) from noon to 1 pm. He was ably assisted on both online shows by his co-host Dawn Taylor, a Portland journalist and frequent guest of the radio show. In May 2010, Emerson began building the Emerson News Network along with Dawn Taylor and his old KOTK program director Bruce Agler. Emerson called on the expertise of members of his audience, many of whom had continued to support him through his unemployment, in order to build the new network. On June 14, 2010, Emerson was a guest on the Cort and Fatboy Show on Cascadia FM, where he announced the launch of the Emerson News Network and the two online shows. Legion of News was structured like the 'news hour' of his previous shows, but without his many diatribes, and The Rick Emerson Show followed the format of the radio show and featured news stories, guests, observations, and audience interaction. The Rick Emerson Show was broadcast via Live365 from RickEmersonShow.com and required a $6.99/month subscription. According to Emerson, both shows were widely listened to, including listeners from all over the world. Cascadia.fm was sold in December 2011, moving Legion of News under the Emerson News Network subscription service.

On January 2, 2012, Emerson announced his retirement from the broadcasting industry. The Internet station he started has continued under the moniker Funemployment Radio Network with on-air hosts (and station managers) Greg Nibler and Sarah X Dylan.

== Bigger Than Jesus: The Diary of a Rock and Roll Fan ==
Bigger Than Jesus is a one-man stage show that Emerson performed in Portland, Oregon. The Portland Mercury wrote that Bigger Than Jesus is "Emerson's deeply personal love letter to rock music... a coming-of-age tribute to the music that shaped his life." The show debuted to a standing room only audience in 2003. The title is a reference to John Lennon's infamous statement that the Beatles were more popular than Jesus. The show was directed and filmed by Portland film director Joni DeRouchie. Emerson and DeRouchie produced a DVD of the show in 2005. The pair also collaborated on the short thriller film Remote Control (2004), the television pilot Rock Roundtable (2005), and the radio play Ebenezer? I Barely Knew Her! (2007).

== Zombie Economics: A Guide to Personal Finance ==
Emerson co-wrote Zombie Economics with Lisa Desjardins, who is currently political director at PBS NewsHour. Lara Gifford, who was married to Emerson at the time, was an uncredited third author. The book likens debt and financial problems to an invasion of zombies. Its premise is "the theory that every skill needed to survive an economic downturn mirrors a skill needed to survive the zombie apocalypse." Emerson got the idea for the book while having a dinner conversation with his wife about friends losing their jobs. "The zombie metaphor" popped into his head as an ideal way to convey the terror of facing financial ruin. Chapters include "A Basement Full of Ammo" and "They'll Eat the Fat Ones First". The book was released on May 3, 2011.

== Television ==
Emerson hosted Outlook Portland, a public affairs show that aired Sundays at 6:30-7:00 am on NW 32 TV.

Emerson has appeared in two television series: Leverage and Grimm.

== Filmography ==
- Remote Control (2004)
- Bigger Than Jesus: The Diary of a Rock & Roll Fan (2005)
- Rock Roundtable (2005)
