= KKWA =

Radio station in West Linn–Portland, Oregon

- West Linn, Oregon; United States
- Broadcast area: Portland metropolitan area
- Frequency: 96.3 MHz (HD Radio)
- Branding: Worship 24/7

Programming
- Format: Contemporary worship music
- Subchannels: HD2: WayFM Network; HD3: Spanish Christian adult contemporary "Vida Unida"; HD4: Contemporary Christian (KPLP)

Ownership
- Owner: WAY-FM Network; (Hope Media Group)
- Operator: 247 Media Ministries

History
- First air date: January 18, 1986
- Former call signs: KHQE (1983, CP); KWSI (1983–1991); KTWI (1991–1998); KWEG (1998–2000); KWPK (2000–2001); KRCO-FM (2001–2002); KWLZ-FM (2002–2016); KWEE (2016–2019)
- Former frequencies: 96.5 MHz (1986–2015)
- Call sign meaning: "WAY-FM" (previous format)

Technical information
- Licensing authority: FCC
- Facility ID: 13581
- Class: C3
- ERP: 1,350 watts
- HAAT: 386 meters (1,266 ft)
- Transmitter coordinates: 45°29′20″N 122°41′40″W
- Translator: HD4: 104.5 K283BL (Portland)

Links
- Public license information: Public file; LMS
- Website: worship247.com; www.wayfm.com/portland (HD2); vidaunida.com (HD3)

KKWA (96.3 FM) is a listener-supported radio station licensed to serve West Linn, Oregon. KKWA airs a contemporary worship music radio format branded as "Worship 24/7". It is provided by the WAY-FM Network. KKWA's transmitter is sited off Southwest Fairmount Boulevard.

KKWA broadcasts in HD Radio and has several subchannels of Christian radio programming.

== History ==
=== Warm Springs location ===
On January 18, 1986, the station signed on the air, based in Warm Springs, Oregon and was heard at 96.5 FM. Its original call sign was KWSI and it aired an adult contemporary music format. Warm Springs is a community in Jefferson County, in the north-central part of Oregon, with about 2400 residents. In 1991, KWSI changed its call letters to KTWI and simulcast the classic rock format of KTWS 98.3 FM in Bend, Oregon, as "The Twins 98-3 & 96-5". In 1995, KTWI became "Warm 96" with a mix of soft adult contemporary and country music. In 1996, the station began a simulcast with KIJK, branded as "More Country 95/96-5".

In 1998, the station changed its call letters to KWEG and returned to a hot adult contemporary format as "The Eagle". In 2000, the station changed its call letters to KWPK and rebranded as "The Peak". In 2001, the station became KRCO-FM with a country music format.

On July 24, 2002, the station changed call letters to KWLZ-FM and switched to an active rock format, branded as "Lazer 96-5". On December 13, 2004, KWLZ-FM shifted its format to classic rock, still under the "Lazer 96-5" branding. On August 22, 2008, KWLZ-FM switched to a simulcast of talk-formatted KBNW 1340 AM Bend, Oregon, branded as "News Radio Central Oregon".

=== Move to Portland ===
On September 8, 2015, KWLZ-FM's 96.5 FM transmitter in Warm Springs went silent, ending its simulcast with KBNW. The station owner, 3 Horizons, had asked the Federal Communications Commission (FCC) for permission to move to 96.3 FM in the Portland radio market, using West Linn as its new city of license. The move would increase the value of the station and allow it to sell advertising in the Portland area, a market of more than 2.3 million residents.

On September 18, 2015, KWLZ-FM's 96.3 Portland-area signal signed on the air with a rock-leaning classic hits format, branded as "96.3 KWLZ". KWLZ-FM's license was granted for its West Linn facilities on September 24.

On August 1, 2016, at 5 pm, Alpha Media began operating KWLZ-FM under a local marketing agreement (LMA) with 3 Horizons. It flipped the station's format to Rhythmic Contemporary, branded as "WE 96-3". The station changed its call sign to KWEE on August 12, 2016.

=== Christian radio ===
On June 4, 2019, 3 Horizons LLC announced that it would sell KWEE to the WAY-FM Network, whose Christian AC programming was also heard on K283BL via iHeartMedia's KFBW-HD2. The sale also ended its LMA with Alpha Media. WAY-FM moved the Christian AC format to KWEE 96.3 upon the closing of the sale. On September 16, 2019, Alpha transitioned KWEE's format to translator K275CH (102.9 FM), replacing KXTG's Sports simulcast. The translator was relaunched as "WE 102.9". The sale was completed on October 2, at which point 96.3 adopted the WAY-FM format under new call sign KKWA.

On October 30, 2023, KKWA changed from contemporary Christian to worship music, branded as "Worship 24/7". It uses a syndicated format from the WAY-FM Network, with operations in Colorado Springs, Colorado, and Franklin, Tennessee. The previous WAY-FM contemporary Christian format heard on the main signal moved to the station's HD2 subchannel.
