= Lisa Desjardins =

American political journalist

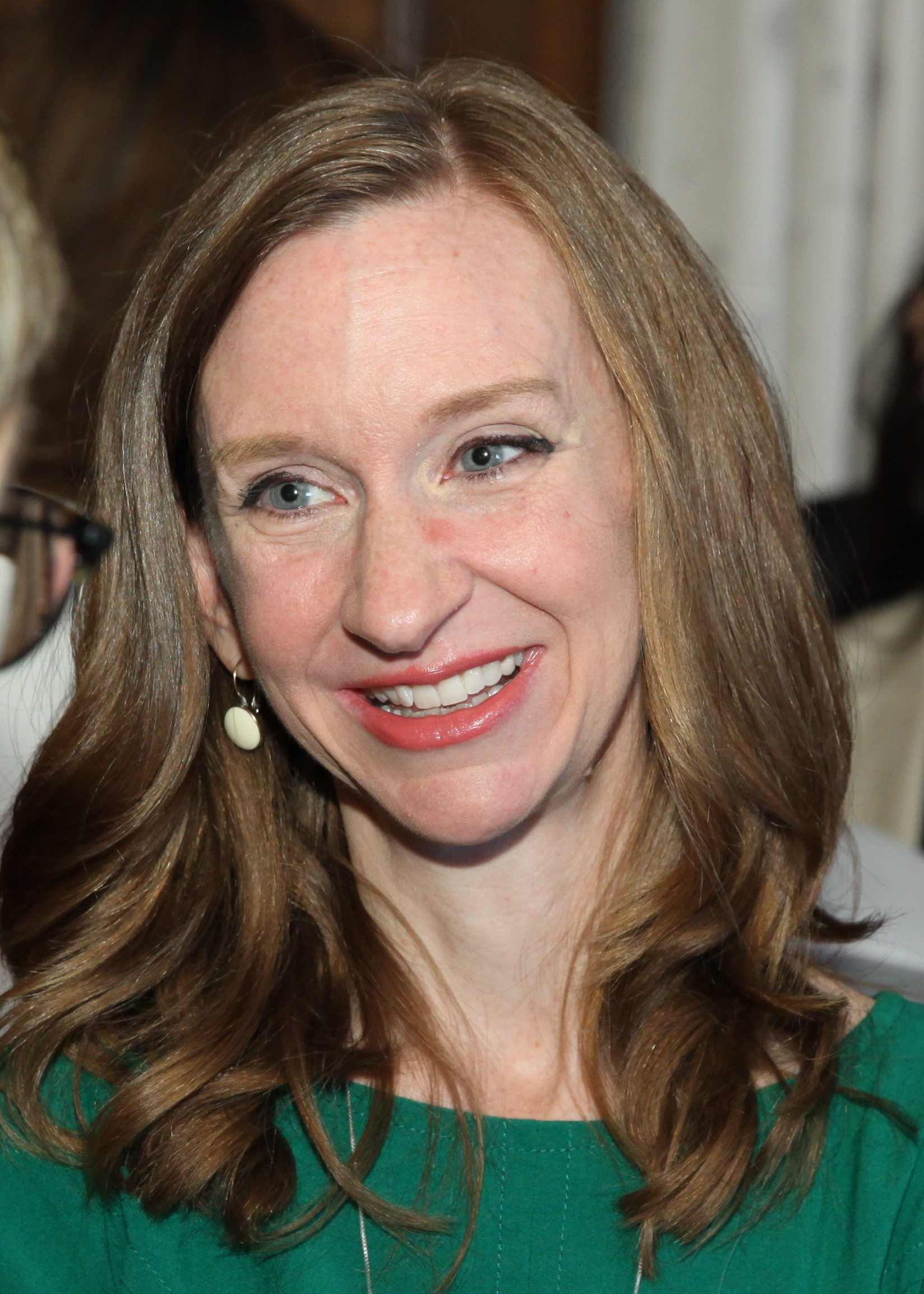
- Desjardins in 2019
- Born: Lisa Goddard; January 29, 1972 (age 54); Hawaii, U.S.
- Education: College of William & Mary (BS); Northwestern University (MS)
- Occupation: Journalist
- Spouse: Jason Desjardins (m. 2007)
- Children: 1

Lisa Desjardins (née Goddard; born January 29, 1972) is an American political journalist. She is a correspondent at PBS NewsHour and has previously worked for the Associated Press and CNN Radio. As of 2018, she has reported on five U.S. presidential elections.

== Early life and education ==
Desjardins was born in Hawaii but grew up in Annandale, Virginia. Her father was a naval officer who retired at the rank of captain and later worked as a college instructor. She has three siblings and seven step siblings on her father's side. She became interested in politics during her childhood.

Desjardins studied at the College of William & Mary in Williamsburg, Virginia, from 1990 to 1994, earning a bachelor's degree in economics. Subsequently, she spent two years doing Russian studies at Herzen University in Saint Petersburg, where she learned to speak Russian. Starting in 1996, she attended Northwestern University's Medill School of Journalism. She received a Master of Science degree in journalism from that university the following year.

== Career ==
Desjardins' first job in journalism was at the local television station WBTW in Myrtle Beach, South Carolina, between 1998 and 1999, when she was fired. Next, she worked as a freelance reporter for The Sun News, a Myrtle Beach newspaper, and, at the same time, as a freelance reporter for the news agency Reuters. After a few months, in October 1999, she left The Sun News and joined the Columbia NBC-affiliate WIS as a political reporter, while she remained a reporter for Reuters. At WIS, she covered the South Carolina Legislature, the debate on the display of the Confederate Flag at the South Carolina State House, and the 2000 Republican presidential primaries. In 2003, Desjardins became a reporter in the Washington, D.C., bureau of the Associated Press, where she reported on, among other things, the 2004 presidential election; Medicaid; hurricanes; and the Iraq War.

Next, Desjardins moved to CNN, where she worked for nine years from 2005 to 2014. She was CNN Radio's Congressional correspondent, but also occasionally reported for CNN.com and CNN's news channel. Desjardins reported on the 2010 Haiti earthquake for CNN Radio, whose coverage was awarded a Sigma Delta Chi Award. When CNN Radio was shut down in June 2013, she was transferred to CNN's Washington Bureau, where she worked as a Capitol Hill reporter. She was part of the team that covered the 2008 presidential primaries. CNN received a Peabody Award in 2008 for the team's coverage. During her time at CNN, she and Rick Emerson wrote a book on personal finance, entitled Zombie Economics: A Guide to Personal Finance. It was published in May 2011 by Avery Publishing. Desjardins chaired the June 2014 annual dinner of the Radio and Television Correspondents' Association. She left CNN after being laid off in August 2014.

Desjardins joined PBS NewsHour in October 2014 as a political reporter, and in July 2015 was elevated to Political Director, appearing on camera from the studio and from the U.S. Capitol. She also writes articles for the NewsHour website. Her current title on the NewsHour is Capitol Hill Correspondent.

Desjardins was inside the U.S. Capitol on January 6, 2021, covering the counting and certification of the 2020 Presidential Electoral College votes when the building was attacked by violent mobs. Despite being assaulted by a rioter, she continued reporting live throughout the attack and was evacuated alongside members of Congress and staffers to the Longworth House Office Building. Later that evening, Desjardins returned to cover the delayed certification process and remained in the Capitol until 3:45 a.m. the following day. In 2022, PBS NewsHour received a Peabody Award for its January 6 reporting, with Desjardins the only reporter broadcasting live from the Capitol outside of the area under lockdown.

== Personal life ==
Desjardins has been married to Jason Desjardins since 2007. They have a son, who was born in 2016, and they live in Alexandria, Virginia.
