= KINK =

Radio station in Portland, Oregon

- Portland, Oregon; United States
- Broadcast area: Northwest Oregon and Southwest Washington
- Frequency: 101.9 MHz (HD Radio)
- Branding: 101.9 KINK FM

Programming
- Format: Adult album alternative
- Subchannels: HD2: 102.9 KUFO (Active rock)

Ownership
- Owner: Connoisseur Media; (Alpha Media Licensee LLC)
- Sister stations: KBFF; KUFO; KUPL; KXL-FM; KXTG

History
- First air date: December 25, 1968
- Call sign meaning: "The Underground Link" (former slogan)

Technical information
- Licensing authority: FCC
- Facility ID: 53068
- Class: C
- ERP: 100,000 watts
- HAAT: 501.6 meters (1,646 ft)
- Transmitter coordinates: 45°30′58.4″N 122°43′58.8″W
- Translator: HD2: 102.9 K275CH (Gresham)

Links
- Public license information: Public file; LMS
- Webcast: Listen live; Listen live (via iHeartRadio); HD2: Listen live; HD2: Listen live (via iHeartRadio)
- Website: www.kink.fm; www.1029kufo.com (HD2)

KINK (101.9 FM) is a commercial radio station in Portland, Oregon. It is owned by Connoisseur Media and it airs an adult album alternative radio format. KINK's studios and offices are on Southwest 5th Avenue in the PacWest Center. The signal is heard over much of Northwest Oregon and Southwest Washington. The transmitter is located off Southwest Barnes Road in the West Hills.

Although KINK's format has evolved over the years, its sound, philosophy, target audience, marketing, and community involvement have remained fundamentally consistent over its 50+ year history, a rarity in commercial broadcasting. Many of KINK's DJs have been associated with the station for decades. In the vernacular of commercial radio, KINK is known as a "heritage" radio station.

== History ==
The station began broadcasting Christmas Day, 1968, as "KINK – The Underground Link". It was a sister station to KGW (now KPOJ) and KGW-TV. The stations were owned by Seattle-based King Broadcasting. KINK aired a freeform/progressive rock format, where the DJs chose the music they would play. Over time, the format evolved to adult album alternative. The station is a prior employer of screenwriter Mike Rich (Nativity Story, Finding Forrester), who worked there as the morning newsman and co-host early in his career.

In 1998, KINK was sold to CBS Radio. In August 2009, CBS Radio sold its Portland cluster (including KINK) to Alpha Media, in an effort to focus on major market stations. Alpha Media merged with Connoisseur Media on September 4, 2025.

From its first broadcast in 1968 until August 2010, the studios and offices were co-located with KGW-TV on Southwest Jefferson Street, west of Downtown Portland. In August 2010, Alpha Broadcasting moved the station to the PacWest Center, in downtown.

== HD Radio ==
On December 17, 2014, KINK began broadcasting digitally in HD Radio, with a simulcast of co-owned sports radio station KXTG ("750 The Game") on its HD2 sub channel. KINK's HD2 programming is also heard on a 99-watt FM translator, 102.9 K275CH in Gresham. On September 16, 2019, KINK-HD2/K275CH dropped the sports simulcast with KXTG and changed their format to rhythmic CHR, branded as "WE 102.9".

Just before 1 a.m. on February 2, 2026, KINK-HD2/K275CH dropped the rhythmic format and began stunting with a loop of "I Got You Babe" by Sonny & Cher. The next day, the stunting changed to a loop of John Williams' opening score from Star Wars. Finally, at 12:55 a.m. on February 4, KINK-HD2/K275CH flipped to active rock, branded as "102.9 KUFO", reviving the format and branding that aired on 101.1 FM from 1989 to 2011.

== Programming ==
KINK plays a wide variety of music, including adult album alternative, rock, acoustic, folk, pop, blues, reggae and new age. KINK's format also features several special programs, some of which have been in place for many years. These include the Sunday Night Blues Room, Sunday Acoustic KINK, and Tranceformation, a weekly selection of trance and chill music. KINK showcases emerging artists from the Portland area with its nightly Local Music Spotlight feature, as well as independent or unsigned artists with a feature known as The Gamut. Beginning in 1973 and ending in the early 2000s KINK aired a late night program of mellow instrumental music known as "Lights Out". A version of the program was resumed in 2021, but ended in early 2023.

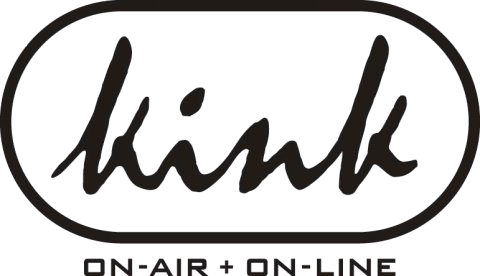
Older KINK logo

The station regularly airs special music features in addition to its regular format. These features can run for a weekend or longer, and often involve input from KINK's listeners. Such features include the Listener Sets Weekend, the KINK Hall of Fame, Five Decades of KINK, and the KINK Summer School of Rock.

In recent years, KINK has expanded its offerings of live musical performances. The KINK Live Performance Lounge brings together touring artists and KINK listeners for casual three to five song performances with brief interviews, either in the KINK studio's performance space, or in another location such as a concert venue or coffee shop. These sessions are recorded, and annual compilations are released in the KINK Live CD series, a benefit for Start Making A Reader Today. The Live Performance Lounge sessions are also videotaped, and are presented on the station's website with high quality audio.

KINK has a longstanding involvement in fundraising efforts for Oregon Food Bank. These include the Lights Out CD compilation series, the annual KINK Christmas Concerts and the Waterfront Blues Festival. Together, these have raised more than one million dollars for the food bank.

KINK's website has become part of its identity and outreach, with the station identifying itself as "kink dot fm" on the air and in its marketing. The website's content is regularly updated and expanded, including interactivity with the station's listeners, known as the "KINK Community." KINK.fm also offers streaming audio of the station's broadcast, as well as side channels that focus on specific music elements of Kink's format, such as Lights Out 24/7, the Blues Room, Acoustic Kink, and the New Music Channel.
