= KZKV =

Karnes City, Texas; United States
- Frequency: 103.1 MHz

Programming
- Format: Contemporary Christian music
- Network: K-Love

Ownership
- Owner: Educational Media Foundation

History
- First air date: March 2005 (as KTXX)
- Former call signs: KTXX (2003–2009); KHHL (2009–2022)

Technical information
- Licensing authority: FCC
- Facility ID: 78984
- Class: C2
- ERP: 34,000 watts
- HAAT: 179 meters (587 ft)
- Transmitter coordinates: 29.0130°N 97.6675°W

Links
- Public license information: Public file; LMS
- Webcast: Listen live
- Website: k-love.com

KZKV (103.1 FM) is an American radio station licensed to serve the community of Karnes City, Texas. The station is owned by the Educational Media Foundation (EMF) and is part of its K-Love national network, airing a contemporary Christian music format. The transmitter is located near Yorktown, Texas.

Prior to being exchanged to EMF in 2022, the station operated as a rimshot local station serving the eastern fringes of San Antonio area, though without a substantial signal in the market.

== History ==
In August 2005, KTXX went on air as the 70th Air America Radio affiliate. In December 2006, KTXX dropped Air America and switched to a hybrid format of Spanish-language contemporary Christian music, satellite news, and commentary known as La Luz (The Light).

In 2009, KTXX became La Lupe 103.1 FM, playing Spanish favorites. On November 2, 2009, the station changed their call letters to KHHL. In 2010, the station changed formats once again to Spanish-language sports talk, branded as ESPN Deportes.

On May 6, 2019, KHHL began simulcasting sister station KLEY-FM and its Regional Mexican format.

On February 23, 2022, KLEY-FM and KHHL changed their format from Regional Mexican to Tejano, branded as Tejano 95.7, still simulcasting KLEY-FM. This would ultimately be a placeholder format on KHHL, as just over two weeks later on March 4, owner Alpha Media announced a transfer deal with the Educational Media Foundation; EMF would assume the license of KHHL in exchange for EMF's license for translator K275CH in Portland, Oregon, which was owned by EMF but operated by Alpha. While no cash changed hands in the license swap, Alpha paid $111,000 to offset a portion of the rent remaining on KHHL’s lease. After the sale closed on April 25, 2022, the call sign was changed to KZKV on May 10, 2022, and the station was integrated into the K-Love network.
