= KUFO =

Radio station in Portland, Oregon

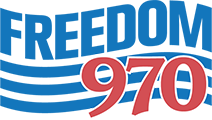
- Portland, Oregon; United States
- Broadcast area: Portland metropolitan area
- Frequency: 970 kHz
- Branding: Freedom 970

Programming
- Format: Talk
- Network: Fox News Radio
- Affiliations: Compass Media Networks; Premiere Networks; Radio America; Salem Radio Network; Westwood One

Ownership
- Owner: Connoisseur Media; (Alpha Media Licensee LLC)
- Sister stations: KBFF; KINK; KUPL; KXTG; KXL-FM

History
- First air date: April 12, 1922
- Former call signs: KQP (1922–1926); KOIN (1926–1977); KYTE (1977–1990); KESI (1990–1991); KBBT (1991–1996); KUPL (1996–2001); KUFO (2001–2002); KUPL (2002–2005); KCMD (2005–2010); KXFD (2010–2011)
- Former frequencies: 1208.8 kHz (1925); 1414.1 kHz (1925); 1309.1 kHz (1925–1926); 1410 kHz (1926); 939.8 kHz (1926–1927); 940 kHz (1927–1941)
- Call sign meaning: Previously used on KUFO (101.1 FM)

Technical information
- Licensing authority: FCC
- Facility ID: 26926
- Class: B
- Power: 5,000 watts
- Transmitter coordinates: 45°30′55.4″N 122°44′0.4″W

Links
- Public license information: Public file; LMS
- Webcast: Listen live; Listen live (via iHeartRadio)
- Website: www.freedom970.com

KUFO (970 AM) is a commercial radio station licensed to Portland, Oregon. The station, owned by Connoisseur Media, calls itself "Freedom 970" and airs a conservative talk radio format. KUFO's offices and studios are on Southwest 5th Avenue in Portland, while the transmitter is located in Portland's West Hills.

== Programming ==
KUFO features mostly nationally syndicated talk shows, including Brian Kilmeade, Dave Ramsey, Sean Hannity, Mark Levin, Dana Loesch and Lars Larson, who is also heard on co-owned KXL-FM. Weekends feature shows on money, health, cars and guns. Syndicated weekend hosts include Guy Benson, Ben Ferguson, Jason Chaffetz and Bret Baier. Some weekend shows are paid brokered programming. Most hours begin with world and national news from Fox News Radio.

The station previously aired Portland State Vikings college football and basketball games and Portland Steel Arena Football League games. Some of those teams are now heard on co-owned sports station KXTG.

== History ==
=== Early years ===
KUFO is among Oregon's earliest radio stations, receiving its first license on April 12, 1922. It was given the randomly assigned call letters KQP, awarded to the Blue Diamond Electric Company in Hood River, Oregon.

KQP moved to Portland in the fall of 1925. It made its Portland debut broadcast on November 9, 1925. It broadcast from a studio in the Portland Hotel that was connected by private telephone line to the transmitter located "one mile north of Sylvan". In April 1926 the station was acquired by the Portland News, which changed the call sign to KOIN. The station's studios were moved to the New Heathman Hotel.

=== FM and TV stations ===
KOIN was an affiliate of the CBS Radio Network, carrying its schedule of dramas, comedies, news, sports, soap operas, game shows and big band broadcasts during the "Golden Age of Radio". It was also an affiliate of the Don Lee Network, based on the West Coast. In March 1941, KOIN moved from 940 kHz to 970 kHz, following the enactment of the North American Regional Broadcasting Agreement (NARBA).

In 1948, KOIN added an FM station, KOIN-FM, which today is co-owned KXL-FM 101.1. KOIN-FM mostly simulcast the AM station until the late 1960s, when it began airing classical music in the evening. In 1953, KOIN put a television station on the air, KOIN-TV (channel 6). Because KOIN Radio was a CBS Radio affiliate, KOIN-TV carried CBS television shows.

=== 1950s–1980s ===
In the 1950s, as network programming moved from radio to television, KOIN began airing a full service middle-of-the-road format, featuring popular music, news, sports and talk. On May 12, 1977, the call letters changed to KYTE, featuring a Top 40 hits format. On September 4, 1979, it switched to country music as "97 Country".

In 1981, the station flipped to automated "Music of Your Life" adult standards programming. On January 27, 1989, KYTE began playing classical music, picking up that format when KYTE-FM 101.1 dropped classical for smooth jazz as KKCY "The City". The classical format turned out to be short-lived on AM 970.

=== 1990s ===
In 1990, the station changed call letters to KESI and aired a mostly instrumental easy listening format branded as "Easy 970". On May 1, 1991, the station again changed call letters to KBBT and began stunting. 18 days later, the station began airing an alternative rock format known as "970 The Beat". In July 1996, KBBT began simulcasting on KDBX (107.5 FM), and tweaked its format to modern AC. On October 2, 1996, The Beat was moved to FM, while 970 changed call letters to KUPL and switched to classic country (as "Straight Country 970").

On September 19, 1997, American Radio Systems, owner of six Portland radio stations, announced that Westinghouse Electric, the owner of CBS Radio, had bought all of its U.S. radio stations, including KUPL. KUPL switched to oldies as "Cruisin' Oldies 970" on January 23, 2001.

=== 2000s ===
On August 1, 2001, KUPL changed its call letters to KUFO, and on August 7, switched to a new hot talk format, branded as "Extreme Talk 970". Hosts featured on "Extreme Radio" include Bob Rivers, Don & Mike, Opie & Anthony, The Sports Junkies and Ron & Fez. On October 11, 2002, after a brief simulcast with active rock KUFO-FM, 970 changed its call letters back to KUPL, returning to classic country as "Straight Country 970".

KCMD branding

AM 970 continued as KUPL until February 2, 2005. At that point, it became KCMD, letters chosen to reflect its "all-comedy format". That same year, after MAX 910 abandoned its hot talk format. CBS Radio decided to use 970 AM to pick up that format. Management switched KCMD to syndicated hot talk programming, including Tom Leykis, Phil Hendrie and Don & Mike, shows that had previously aired on MAX 910. At the same time, the station was renamed "Johnson 970".

By early 2006, CBS Radio asked Rick Emerson to take over as program director and return on-air after being dropped from "MAX 910". Emerson was accompanied by on-air producer Sarah X Dylan and newsman Tim Riley. Within months, Johnson 970 became "AM 970 Solid State Radio", and took on new syndicated talk shows from around the country, including Dennis Miller.

After the launch of "Solid State Radio", the station added a local weekend show (Miles Around Radio & Television), and became the affiliate for Dr. Demento, The Mike O'Meara Show, and The John and Jeff Show, as well as picking up Fox Sports Radio for some weekend hours.

On June 23, 2008, KCMD's slogan changed from "Solid State Radio" to "The Talker". On March 12, 2009, The Rick Emerson Show moved to KCMD's sister station KUFO-FM to replace the canceled The Adam Carolla Show.

=== Alpha Broadcasting ===
In August 2009, CBS Radio sold its Portland cluster, including KCMD, to Alpha Media in an effort to focus on major market stations. Alpha rebranded the station to "Freedom 970" on September 14, 2009. On May 24, 2010, Alpha changed its call letters to KXFD to reflect this branding. KXFD concentrated on mostly conservative talk shows.

On March 22, 2011, the station switched its call sign to KUFO, which it had previously held from August 2001 to October 2002. The call sign became available after co-owned 101.1 FM changed its call letters from KUFO to KXL-FM. The station's conservative talk format was not changed.

Alpha Media merged with Connoisseur Media on September 4, 2025.

== See also ==
- List of initial AM-band station grants in the United States
