= Aaron Duran =

American writer (born 1976)

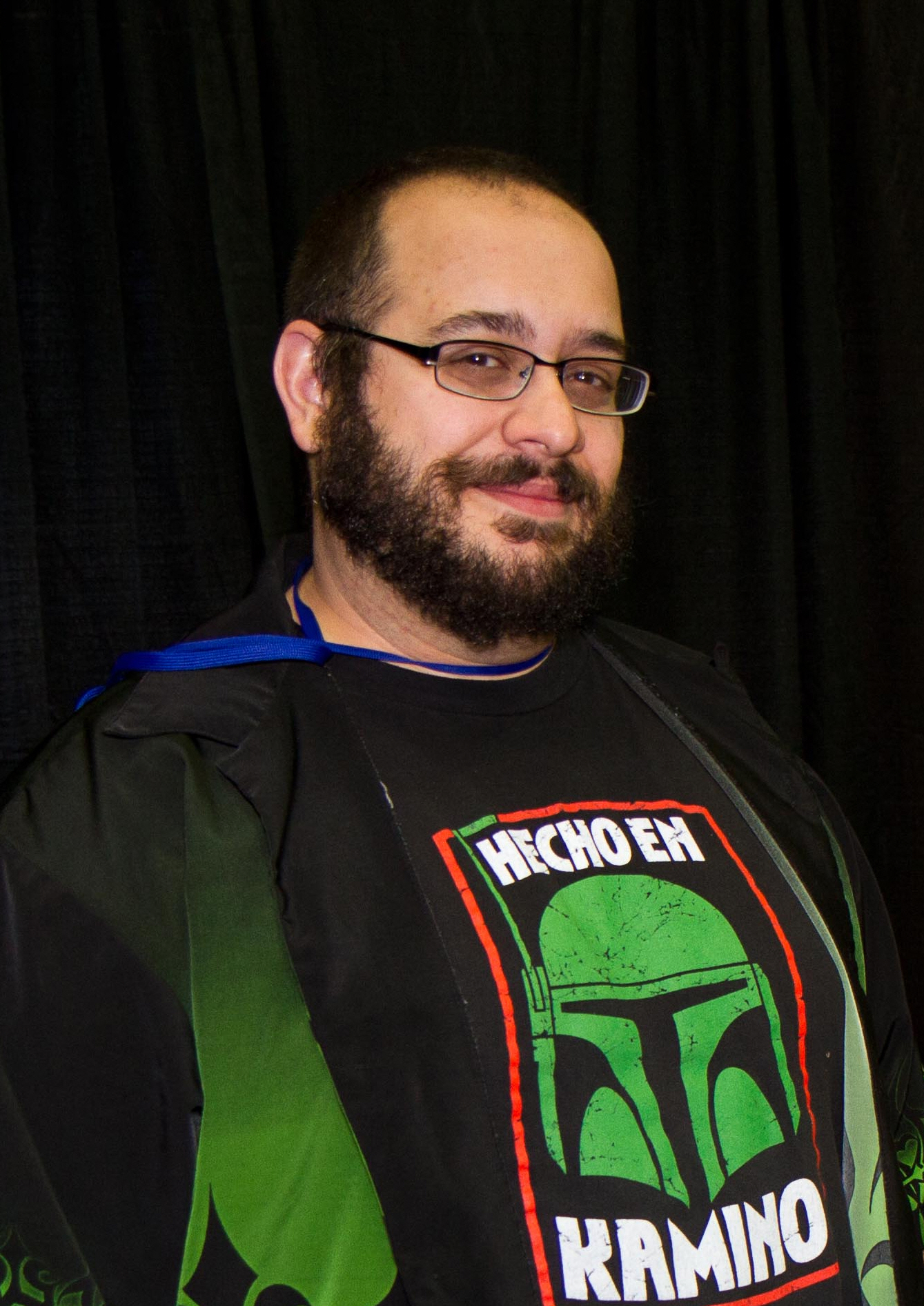
- Aaron Duran at Stumptown Comics Fest, on April 28, 2012
- Born: February 27, 1976 (age 49); Susanville, California, U.S.
- Occupation(s): Writer, Webmaster, Podcaster
- Years active: 2001–present
- Known for: Geek in the City: Radio; The Rick Emerson Show; La Brujeria; The Forgotten Tyrs
- Spouse: Jenn Alvin (m. 2006)

Aaron Duran (born 1976 in Susanville, California) is an American writer and media producer in Portland, Oregon, of Mexican and Italian descent. Duran currently hosts the weekly podcast Geek in the City Radio (FKA Film Fever Radio), with Denise Espinosa and Kabel Hashitani; serves as webmaster of GeekInTheCity.com, is an occasional guest on the daily podcast Funemployment Radio.com, and was a regular guest on the Cort and Fatboy Shows and The Rick Emerson Show. He also served as a producer for the paranormal talk show Ground Zero Radio with Clyde Lewis.

== Geek in the City ==
Duran was a frequent caller to the Rick Emerson Show, while working for the city. Eventually, he acquired the nickname 'Geek in the City', which he latched onto and began to identify himself as. He began a geek orientated website soon after with the same moniker. In 2006, he connected with Scott Daly of Film Fever Radio, a local podcast and former Cable Access program, as a producer and co-host. Over the ensuing 3 years, the show expanded and began to try to move out of just review of films, but found the name as a hindrance. At which point, the show was rebranded Geek in the City: Radio. Over time more members of the Portland Geek Community began to contribute to the show, at one point reaching 8 regular hosts. Around 2015, several hosts began to step away, and Daly retired from the show. Duran enlisted the help of Kabel Hashitani to continue the show, whose acerbic wit was a welcome addition to the show. Portland newcomer Denise Espinosa also joined the show, and began a deep dive into the geek culture that she was interested in, but was only tangentially aware.

=== Boo Yah Awards ===
From 2008 to 2012, Duran and Daly organized an awards show/listener party for Geek in the City: Radio fans. It would include categories similar to the Academy Awards, but with some more geeky interpretations. The events were held at local Portland businesses, and were often well attended for a podcast event, with listeners from all across North America (and a few from Europe), coming to partake in the camaraderie. Due to logistical challenges, the show was cancelled in 2013, and has not yet returned.

== Writing ==
=== La Brujeria ===
Upset with the current state of comics, Aaron began working on his own comic in 2007. He was able to locate an artist in 2009 and a letterer in 2010 and began self publication in January 2011. At present, the comic is available in many comic stores in Portland and online at Geek in the City.com. La Brujeria's plot involves a Mexican American woman named Althalia, gifted with powers from her ancestors, joining a paranormal investigation company based in Portland. The comic draws on Duran's heritage, adoration for comics such as Hell Boy and love of Portland.

=== The Forgotten Tyrs ===
In 2015, Duran published his first novel Welcome to the Grizzlydale part of a planned series of novels called "The Forgotten Tyrs". Many of the elements of the novels are taken from his childhood in Susanville, and the stories and legends that he grew up with. The second novel Rise of the First City was published in 2017. There is at least one more novel planned.

== Rename42nd.org ==
Duran organized a failed effort in 2008 to rename Portland's 42nd Avenue to Douglas Adams Boulevard in honor of science fiction author Douglas Adams.
