= NBG Radio Network =

American radio network

NBG Radio Network, Inc.
- Type: radio network
- Industry: Radio broadcasting, advertising
- Founded: 1996
- Defunct: February 2003
- Headquarters: Portland, Oregon
- Key people: John A. Holmes III, Chairman
- Products: syndicated radio programming
- Revenue: $113.55 million (2001)
- Number of employees: 129

NBG Radio Network was a syndicated American radio network. The Portland, Oregon based company created, produced, distributed and marketed ad time for nationally syndicated radio programs. The company was founded by John A. Holmes and at its peak, the company offered 50 programs airing on over 3,800 radio station affiliates. The company went public in 1998.

NBG Radio Network was incorporated in 1996 under the name of National Broadcasting Group. The name was changed to NBG Radio Network Inc. on January 15, 1998.

The company produced and syndicated many programs that reached approximately 3,800 radio stations on a weekly basis. In the beginning they produced small vignette shows (lasting 1–2 minutes) including: Celebrity Talk, Color of Success with Mychal Thompson, Dollars and Cents, The Flip Side, Modern Rock Minute, Teen Tips, Travel Notes, Fastbreak with Dick Versace, Outdoor Tips, Sports Memories with Rick Barry, Teein' it up, and Flashback. As well as long form shows like Dance Mix America, Big Band Classics, The Country Oldies Show, Trivia Coast-to-Coast, and The Golden Age of Radio.

The network also carried personality shows like the Liz Wilde Show, one of the few female shock jocks, The Rick Emerson Show, Bigg Snoop Dogg Radio and Shadoe Stevens as well as music programming such as Nina Blackwood's Absolutely 80s, and World Atomic Rhythm Parties with Shadoe Stevens. The company also produced programming for the Hispanic radio market.

The company's principal source of revenue was selling radio time to advertisers. In a typical relationship for a one-hour show provided by the company, a radio station agreed to provide them with five to six 60-second advertising spots each time a show was broadcast.

Other revenue sources included subscription services, where customers would receive daily faxes and emails containing show prep sheets. Another alternative revenue source was the development and sale of preferred listener tracking software (PLP) to stations. This eventually resulted in the creation of its wholly owned subsidiary NBG Solutions.

Several of NBG's programs are still on the air on other networks. Golden Age of Radio is now on USA Radio Network; Blackwood's programs are now at United Stations Radio Networks. The Country Oldies Show continues to air as a self-syndicated program, mostly on rural stations.

Its most listened-to show, The Bo Reynolds Show which broadcast for five hours on Saturday nights reached over 150 Stations Nationwide.
