= Sarah X Dylan =

American radio and television personality (born 1980)

- Born: October 9, 1980 (age 45); United States
- Presenting career
- Show: Funemployment Radio; Sportlandia
- Stations: Emerson News Network; Podcast; Trailblazers.tv
- Time slot: Funemployment Radio - 12pm Weekdays (PST); Sportlandia - 9am Weekdays
- Style: Talk
- Country: United States
- Previous show: The Rick Emerson Show
- Website: www.sarahxdylan.com

Sarah X Dylan (born October 9, 1980) is an American Internet radio host, Internet television host, and former radio producer and talk show co-host. Formerly of The Rick Emerson Show and KOIN-TV, and current co-host of Funemployment Radio, and is based in Portland, Oregon.

== Professional name ==
=== "X" ===
The "X" in Sarah X Dylan does not stand for anything. She, along with Rick Emerson, is a huge fan of Futurama, and wanted a distinguishing name for radio, so she chose to use a middle initial of "X", in much the same way as the producer of Futurama, David X. Cohen chose "X" due to there being another David Cohen on the rolls of SAG/WGA.

=== "Dylan" ===
On a September 2013 show, Dylan claimed the "Dylan" in her name comes from her favorite Beverly Hills 90210 character Dylan McKay, portrayed by Luke Perry.

== Early life and education ==
Dylan was born to a naval family and spent some time in Spain as a child. As a teenager, she lived in Oak Harbor, Washington while her father was stationed at NAS Whidbey Island, and attended Oak Harbor High School. Her sophomore year, her family moved to Bremerton, Washington where she graduated from high school in 1998. She graduated from Washington State University in Pullman, Washington in 2002, with a bachelor's degree in communications.

== Career ==
=== Radio ===
Dylan began working for Metro Networks as a traffic reporter for Portland, based at KOTK. She began spending her off time with The Rick Emerson Show, eventually being chosen as the producer of the show, after the exit of former producer Christina Carlson. She worked along with Executive Producer Matt "F-Matt" Peterson until the sale of KOTK from Fisher Communications to Entercom Communications, and Peterson's promotions. She and Emerson had great chemistry on the air, causing her role to slowly morph into a co-host, along with Emerson and newsman Tim Riley.

When KOTK and KFXX swapped frequencies, Dylan began co-hosting Alternative Mornings on "Alternative Rock" KNRK, which was also owned by Entercom, in addition to her duties on Emerson's show. She also hosted segments featuring the promotion of local independent bands, in a recurring piece called "Band-Aid", which aired on both KNRK and KOTK.

In April 2005, Dylan accepted a position to join the morning news on the local CBS affiliate station KOIN as the morning traffic reporter. As a result, she quit the show on KNRK, with a strong desire to remain on Emerson's show. As a punitive measure, Entercom fired her from Emerson's show. Dylan quickly became a vital member of the KOIN Morning News, and stayed with the show until late 2006.

In early 2006, Emerson announced a deal to bring his show back to the air. Initially, both KOIN and KCMD shared a building, and Dylan had several hours between shows; however over time, the stress of both shows, along with a management change at KOIN caused her to rethink her decisions. In September 2006, she left KOIN and began working exclusively for The Rick Emerson Show.

In early 2009, Dylan partnered with Lisa Wood to host The Punk Show on Sunday nights on KUFO. The Punk Show was cancelled in August, and The Rick Emerson Show was cancelled in October 2009.

=== Podcasting ===
Less than a week after being fired from KUFO, Dylan and former production assistant Greg Nibler started a podcast named Funemployment Radio, from Nibler's spare bedroom. After nearly eight months, Emerson, along with Dawn Taylor, began two online radio shows, complete with studio space, which they share with Greg and Sarah.

In early 2011, Dylan and Nibler were approached by the Portland Trail Blazers to host an online TV show that would discuss Portland cultures and sports. The new show was named Sportlandia, a portmanteau of "Sports" and Portlandia (a common nickname for the Portland Metro, as well as a TV show about the city). Sportlandia originally aired each Friday at 4 pm, and at present airs at 12 pm Fridays. They would also broadcast a recap after each play-off game, during the NBA Playoffs.

=== Music ===
She performed in the now-disbanded Tim Riley Factor, composed of various friends and members of The Rick Emerson Show. They performed original songs, including "Gene Simmons (took my girlfriend away)", which was later included on The Wonderstrucks' 2007 album "An American Education".

She is featured in the 2007 music video for the song "And It Becomes You" by the band Nicodemus.

In March 2008, she was half of a duo that performed the ObamaRama song "If You Like Barack". A parody of Rupert Holmes' "Escape", it spoofed the media's infatuation with grassroots songs promoting 2008 presidential candidates. Instead, some in the media mistook it for a legitimate rally of support and it received airplay, including on the Air America Radio network's Thom Hartmann show on April 2.

== Awards ==
Known to The Rick Emerson Show audience as the most social of the cast, she earned the 2007 Barfly Magazine award for "Best Drunk"'. Dylan lost in the previous year's "Most likely to be famous" category.

In 2016 and 2017 Funemployment Radio won Best Local Podcast in the Best of Portland Readers' Poll.

== Personal life ==
Dylan lives in Southeast Portland, Oregon. She currently works as a barback at an undisclosed Portland bar, and has also been known to work at a vintage clothing store.

Dylan has raced in the annual Portland Adult Soap Box Derby, where in 2007 she and her teammates raced an extravagantly gaudy Popemobile while dressed up as nuns. In 2018 the vehicle was designed as a parade float, with Dylan and friends dressed up as bloody beauty queens.
