= Tim Riley (radio personality) =

American radio personality

- Born: Nashua, New Hampshire
- Presenting career
- Style: Talk
- Country: United States
- Website: rileylive.com

Tim Riley is a Northwest media personality in Portland, Oregon. He is currently an Anchor/Reporter with KPAM AM 860 and KKOV, Portland Oregon. He served as News Director/Anchor for Hot Talk 1080 KOTK, Max 910 during Imus In The Morning, and KUFO during The Rick Emerson Show from 2001 until 2009. Born in Nashua, New Hampshire, Riley got involved with a local radio station and began a career that took him to California. After ending a ten-year stint in Southern California radio, Riley moved to Portland in 1998, where he did afternoon news during the Tom Leykis Show. In 2001, Riley was paired with Emerson.

Tim has been seen on television hosting The Classroom Guide To A Better America, an amusing assortment of social hygiene films originally shown to baby-boomers during their formative years. These programs continued to attract the same niche audience who listened to the daytime program to the late night hours of On Demand Television.

Riley is also an actor and has done freelance voice-over work for many years.

He was also a judge for the 6th and 7th annual Independent Music Awards to support independent artists.

== The Tim Riley Factor ==
During The Rick Emerson Show's tenure on KOTK and MAX910 (2001–2005), Tim's name was used for the show's house band (basically the staff and friends), "The Tim Riley Factor." The band included Emerson, Producer Sarah X Dylan, Kristin from Accounting and a series of other members. The band's original songs included:

- Christmas Time in Portland
- I Want to be a Ramone
- Gene Simmons Took My Girl

The group also performed at a number of live events, including Emerson listener parties.

== Tim Riley Breaking News ==
Riley begun podcasting an offbeat-format news podcast in early 2015 in between his broadcasting gigs for terrestrial Portland radio. He has a short to medium length format podcast and is also featured occasionally as a guest on Funemployment Radio.
