= KBFF =

Radio station in Portland, Oregon

- Portland, Oregon; United States
- Broadcast area: Portland metropolitan area
- Frequency: 95.5 MHz
- Branding: Live 95.5

Programming
- Format: Contemporary hit radio
- Affiliations: Premiere Networks

Ownership
- Owner: Connoisseur Media; (Alpha Media Licensee LLC)
- Sister stations: KINK; KUFO; KUPL; KXL-FM; KXTG

History
- First air date: September 25, 1960
- Former call signs: KGMG (1960–1965); KXL-FM (1965–1999); KXJM (1999–2008); KXTG (2008–2011)
- Call sign meaning: acronym for best friends forever

Technical information
- Licensing authority: FCC
- Facility ID: 949
- Class: C
- ERP: 100,000 watts
- HAAT: 346 meters (1,135 ft)
- Transmitter coordinates: 45°29′19.4″N 122°41′44.3″W

Links
- Public license information: Public file; LMS
- Webcast: Listen live; Listen live (via iHeartRadio)
- Website: www.live955.com

KBFF (95.5 FM, "Live 95.5") is a commercial radio station licensed to Portland, Oregon, and serving the Portland metropolitan area, including parts of Oregon and Washington. The station airs a contemporary hit radio radio format and is owned by Connoisseur Media.

KBFF's studios and offices are located in Downtown Portland, on SW Fifth Avenue. The transmitter is in Portland's West Hills, off SW Fairmount Court. KBFF has an effective radiated power (ERP) of 100,000 watts.

== History ==
=== Early history ===
The 95.5 MHz spot on the FM dial in Portland was first occupied by the original KWJJ-FM. That station signed on in 1946. It only transmitted with an effective radiated power of 3,400 watts and it mostly simulcast KWJJ (1080 AM, now KRSK). In the 1940s and 1950s, few radios could receive FM signals and management saw little opportunity to make it profitable. In the mid-1950s, KWJJ silenced the FM station, giving up the license.

On September 23, 1959, the Federal Communications Commission (FCC) granted International Good Music, Inc. (IGM) a construction permit to build a new FM station on 95.5 MHz. In early October 1959, call sign KGMG was granted, standing for "Good Music", the format term for classical music. By September 9, 1960, KGMG was testing intermittently.

On September 25, 1960, at 7 a.m., KGMG began regular operations by airing programming from the IGM automation system. KGMG broadcast from 7 a.m. to 1 a.m. daily, and only selected commercials were played and no singing jingles were allowed. By March 1962, KGMG was broadcasting the recorded "Heritage Concert" series. On March 17, 1962, KGMG became the second Portland station to broadcast in multiplex stereo. In July 1962, KGMG began leasing antenna space to Pacific Motor Trucking Co. for a 25-watt VHF transmitter.

On April 20, 1964, KGMG switched to an automated MOR format from IGM. By mid-1964, KGMG was broadcasting 9 a.m. to 11 p.m. daily.

=== KXL-FM Stereo 95 ===
On May 13, 1965, the FCC approved the $125,000 sale of KGMG to Seattle, Portland & Spokane Radio, a joint venture of Dena Pictures, Inc. and the Alexander Broadcasting Company. Seattle, Portland & Spokane Radio also owned KXL (750 AM, now KXTG). Two months later, on July 5, 1965, KGMG became KXL-FM and began duplicating KXL's "Good Music" format as KXL & KXL-FM Stereo.

In September 1966, KXL-FM staff began taping the evening "Good Music" programming for syndicator IGM, now known as Broadcast Programming International (BPI). The company provided the software to many FM stations nationwide. In 1969, KXL-FM raised its power to 100,000 watts and increased antenna height to 990 feet.

At the time, KXL (AM) was a daytimer, required to sign off at sunset to avoid interfering with clear channel station WSB in Atlanta, so it simulcast its programming on KXL-FM, which could continue the programming at night. In 1970, KXL-AM-FM switched to a "Popular Music" middle of the road (MOR) format as KXL-FM Stereo 95. Most FM stations by the 1970s could not fully simulcast their AM stations, but this rule did not apply to AM stations that were daytimers. KXL-FM continued to simulcast KXL (AM) through 1974.

In March 1984, KXL-FM switched to TM's Beautiful Music service and was playing five to six vocals an hour until 1989, when the station began running Unistar's "Special Blend" soft adult contemporary satellite format with local morning host George Walker.

=== K95.5/Star 95.5/95.5 KXL ===
In April 1990, KXL-FM changed format to "Lite Favorites", a combination of soft AC and soft rock. It was branded as K95.5. This format also utilized a satellite music service except for drive times.

On September 27, 1993, KXL-FM switched to a hot adult contemporary format as Star 95.5 but only lasted a year.

On October 18, 1994, KXL-FM switched to all 1970s hits as Seventies 95.5. This format only lasted a year and a half.

=== Music Radio 95 KXL/Mix 95.5/95.5FM ===
On April 15, 1996, KXL-FM modified its 1970s format to include 1980s music and adopted the branding Music Radio 95 KXL.

In the fall of 1996, KXL-FM returned to hot AC. On April 1, 1997, KXL-FM switched to a new slogan as Mix 95.5. In December 1997, Carl Widing was hired as program director and in February 1998, KXL-FM switched to an adult album alternative format as 95.5FM.

On November 30, 1998, KXL-FM was sold to the Rose City Radio Corp. for $55 Million.

=== Jammin' 95.5 ===
On March 26, 1999, at 5:30 p.m., KXL-FM switched to a rhythmic contemporary format as Jammin' 95.5, becoming the first FM station in Portland to air the format full time. The first song was "Changes" by 2Pac. On April 30, 1999, KXL-FM changed the call letters to KXJM.

=== 95-5 The Game ===
On May 1, 2008, due to declining ratings, Rose City Radio announced that KXJM would change formats to all sports on May 12, as "95.5 The Game". The switch almost left Portland without a hip-hop station, and as a result, would have left Portland listeners with only two choices for rhythmic music: Mainstream Top 40 station KKRZ, whose playlist included some hip-hop songs, and KVMX, the market's rhythmic adult contemporary station.

On May 9, 2008, at 6 p.m., KVMX officially ditched its rhythmic AC format and became Portland's new home for rhythmic contemporary as "Jammin' 107.5". Both KXJM and KVMX simulcast the format that weekend until KXJM's flip to sports at 9 a.m. the following Monday, May 12. KVMX also acquired the KXJM call letters, the website and all intellectual properties from Rose City.

On May 27, 2008, the original KXJM officially chose KXTG as its new call letters to better reflect the sports format and "The Game" moniker. KXTG and AM sister station KXL would be bought by Alpha Broadcasting in May 2009. Despite the station's emphasis on local hosts, ratings success did not follow, usually peaking at about a 2.0 share in the Arbitron ratings.

=== Live 95-5 ===
On May 21, 2011, Alpha announced that on May 25, at 5:00 p.m., KXTG's sports format would be moving to AM 750 KXL, which was running a news/talk format that at the time was simulcasting on 101.1 FM, previously a rock station. The 95.5 facility would then launch a new format at the same time.

The question of what the format would be began to take on a life of its own when industry website RadioInsight reported that Alpha registered several domain names for the station, in order to keep people guessing. On May 24, 2011, a logo and website for "Live 95.5" appeared in a Google cache, with the hint referenced in its moniker as "Today's Modern Mix", indicating a contemporary music format.

On May 25, at 5 p.m., KXTG flipped to a hot AC/Adult Top 40 format as Live 95-5, Today's Modern Mix For The Modern Woman. The first song was "Raise Your Glass" by P!nk, beginning a 10,000 songs-in-a-row promotion to attract listeners interest. The station also changed its call letters to KBFF.

KBFF saw its ratings improve, going from a 1.9 in its last book as a sports outlet in May 2011 to a 3.6 share in the June 2011 book, along with a spike in its audience cumes, topping 105.1 The Buzz for the Adult Top 40 crown.

In September 2012, KBFF shifted to Top 40/CHR. To capitalize on this, the station shortened its slogan to "Today's Modern Mix", and then eventually "Portland's #1 Hit Music Station."

In August 2014, KBFF dropped its entire on-air lineup and relaunched as Live 95.5, The Station That Sounds Like Portland.

In April 2015, the station restructured its on-air lineup, adding the syndicated Brooke & Jubal morning drive time show, based at KQMV in Seattle.

On October 22, 2018, at 10 a.m., as a Halloween stunt, KBFF began branding itself as “eviL 95-5” (“eviL” is Live spelled backwards) and started airing spooky sounds in between songs. This continued until November 1 at Midnight.

Alpha Media was acquired by Connoisseur Media on September 4, 2025. On March 2, 2026, Brooke & Jeffrey were replaced by Anna & Raven from Connoisseur's WEZN-FM in Bridgeport, Connecticut, as part of a rollout of the program across former Alpha Media stations.
