= Natal Border Guard =

British Empire auxiliary force during Anglo-Zulu war

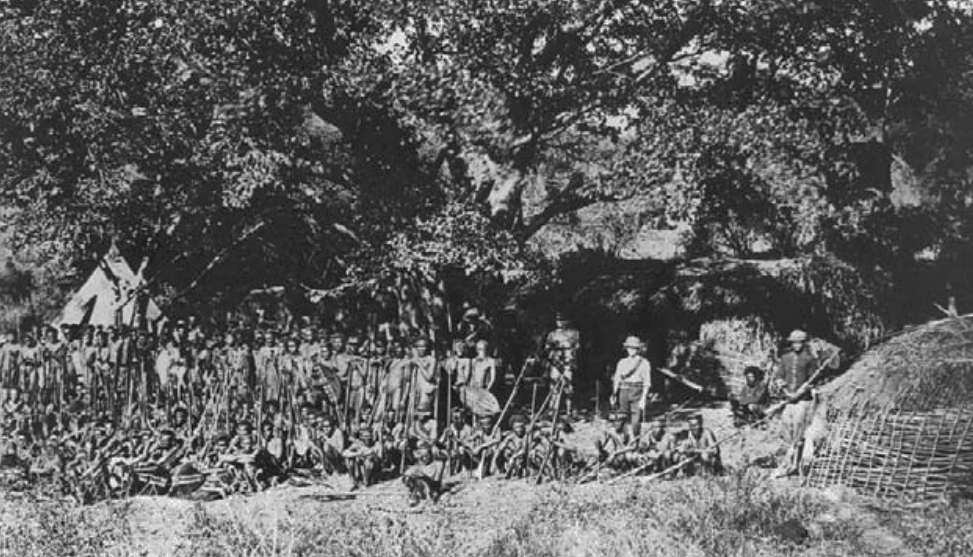
- Natal Border Guard of district VI at White Rock Drift
- Active: 20 December 1878 – September 1879
- Country: Colony of Natal
- Allegiance: British Empire
- Type: Auxiliary
- Role: Border guard
- Size: 7,700 men
- Engagements: Anglo-Zulu War

The Natal Border Guard (also known as the River Guards) was an auxiliary force levied for the defence of the Colony of Natal during the Anglo-Zulu War of 1879. British military commander Lord Chelmsford had intended to raise a large auxiliary force to support his invasion of the Zulu Kingdom but was opposed by the civilian government of the Colony of Natal, led by its governor Henry Ernest Gascoyne Bulwer, who would have to finance the unit. Bulwer eventually allowed a smaller force (of 2,800 men) to be raised with the stipulation that it not be deployed outside of Natal. This unit was to serve only on a part-time basis, receive no training and fight with the traditional weapons of spear and shield.

Following the defeat of the British force during the Battle of Isandlwana the Border Guard was strengthened and equipped with a limited number of firearms. The unit fought in defence of the border against Zulu counter-raids into Natal. One of the Border Guard commanders was responsible for negotiating the submission of a number of Zulu chiefs in the border region after the end of the war.

== Background ==
The British High Commissioner for Southern Africa Sir Henry Bartle Frere had ambitions to form a confederation of all the British possessions in Southern Africa. He planned the annexation of the independent Zulu Kingdom, which was opposed by King Cetshwayo and led to the Anglo-Zulu War of 1879. As part of preparations for this war the British military commander in Southern Africa, Frederic Thesiger (who later became Lord Chelmsford and is more commonly known by that name), implemented defensive measures in the British Colony of Natal.

Natal's 240-kilometre (150 mi) long border with the Zulu Kingdom lay along the Buffalo (Mzinyathi) and Tugela (Thukela) rivers. To defend the border Chelmsford sought to raise a 6,000-strong auxiliary force under control of the civil authorities. This would supplement the existing Natal Native Contingent (NNC) auxiliary which was under military control and expected to participate in the forthcoming invasion. The existing Natal volunteer military units were insufficient to ensure defence of the colony as many had been earmarked to form part of the invading force. Of the colony's paramilitary Natal Mounted Police, 130 were earmarked to join the invasion force and only 43 to remain in the colony at their posts in Estcourt and Harding, far from the border with Zululand.

The Natal government was liable for the costs of any force raised specifically for the defence of the colony. The white settlers of Natal had feared invasion since the Zulu Civil War of 1856 which cemented Cetshwayo's position as heir and the main power in the kingdom; they also had concerns over a possible insurrection by the black population of the colony or that of nearby Basutoland, Transkei (Kaffraria) and the Transvaal. The colony's government took few steps for its defence other than establishing a number of laager sites as refuges for the white population.

== Formation ==
The Natal defence districts. Zululand lies to the north east of Natal, Transvaal to the north, the Orange Free State to the north-west, Basutoland to the west and Kaffraria to the south.

Once Chelmsford's invasion had commenced, apart from along his lines of communication, he intended to leave British troops as garrisons only at the colony's capital, Pietermaritzburg, and its largest city, Durban, leaving the general defence of Natal to its own government. Chelmsford met the Natal Colony's Defence Committee on 10 September 1878 and persuaded them to take action. On 26 November the committee divided the colony into seven defensive districts of which three directly bordered Zululand: District I from the Transvaal border east beyond Rorke's Drift, District VI in the centre and District VII towards the Indian Ocean coast in the east. Districts II and III lay south behind the border districts and Districts IV and V further south behind them. Special sub-districts were established at Pietermaritzburg, under direct command of the colonial secretary, Charles Mitchell, and at Durban under Major John Huskisson of the 56th (West Essex) Regiment of Foot.

The committee was unwilling to finance Chelmsford's proposed 6,000-man auxiliary force but did agree to fund a smaller border guard unit. A Special Border Police of around 100 local African personnel under white border agents were raised in November in the three defensive districts that bordered Zululand. Their role was to gather intelligence on Zulu movements rather than to act as a military force. Commandants were appointed for each defensive district on 3 December, receiving control over the small number of white volunteer units in their district as well as the government laagers, ammunition stores and weapons stockpiles.

The Natal government recognised that their existing forces could do little more than a passive defensive role focussed on the settlements and laagers. To provide a means of combatting Zulu raids in the countryside between they agreed to put some of their black population under arms, despite misgivings from the white settlers. The Natal Border Guard was raised from 20 December 1878 by a levy on the African men residing Districts I, VI and VII; officers were white volunteers. Because of the cost and the impact on the local labour supply the colony could not afford to permanently staff this force, but intended it as a part-time force to be called out in times of trouble. The men for the unit were selected by their chiefs who were given quotas to fill.

The unit initially numbered some 2,800 men who rotated between active service and reserve duty. Those on reserve were allowed to return home to tend to their crops and livestock, a measure that limited costs by reducing the need for the government to provide food, shelter and clothing. The men initially received no formal training, uniform or weapons and were expected to fight in their traditional tribal style with spears and shields. The units were organised on tribal lines under the leadership of local chiefs. Recruitment was slow; there was little enthusiasm as compensation payments to the chiefs were delayed and the population was demotivated by the recent implementation of a hut tax. To improve manpower the levy was later extended to Districts II, IV and V. Some units of the Border Guard were still not fully formed by April 1879. The Natal Border Guard was formally under the control of the civilian government of the colony, but Governor Henry Ernest Gascoyne Bulwer conceded that Chelmsford had the right to choose where to deploy the men along the border.

Chelmsford expected his invasion of Zululand to begin in January 1879 and to take less than seven weeks to achieve its objective of subjugating the Zulu people. The Buffalo and Tugela were generally unpassable before March except at a small number of fords, known locally as drifts. Chelmsford, therefore, expected the border to be effectively impregnable to Zulu raiding parties or even a full-scale counter-invasion, provided the drifts could be guarded. In early January 1879 the Border Guard were posted in groups of around 300-350 men to points along the border, typically at drifts where no other British or colonial garrison was provided. Due to their role the unit also became known known as the "River Guards".

== Service ==
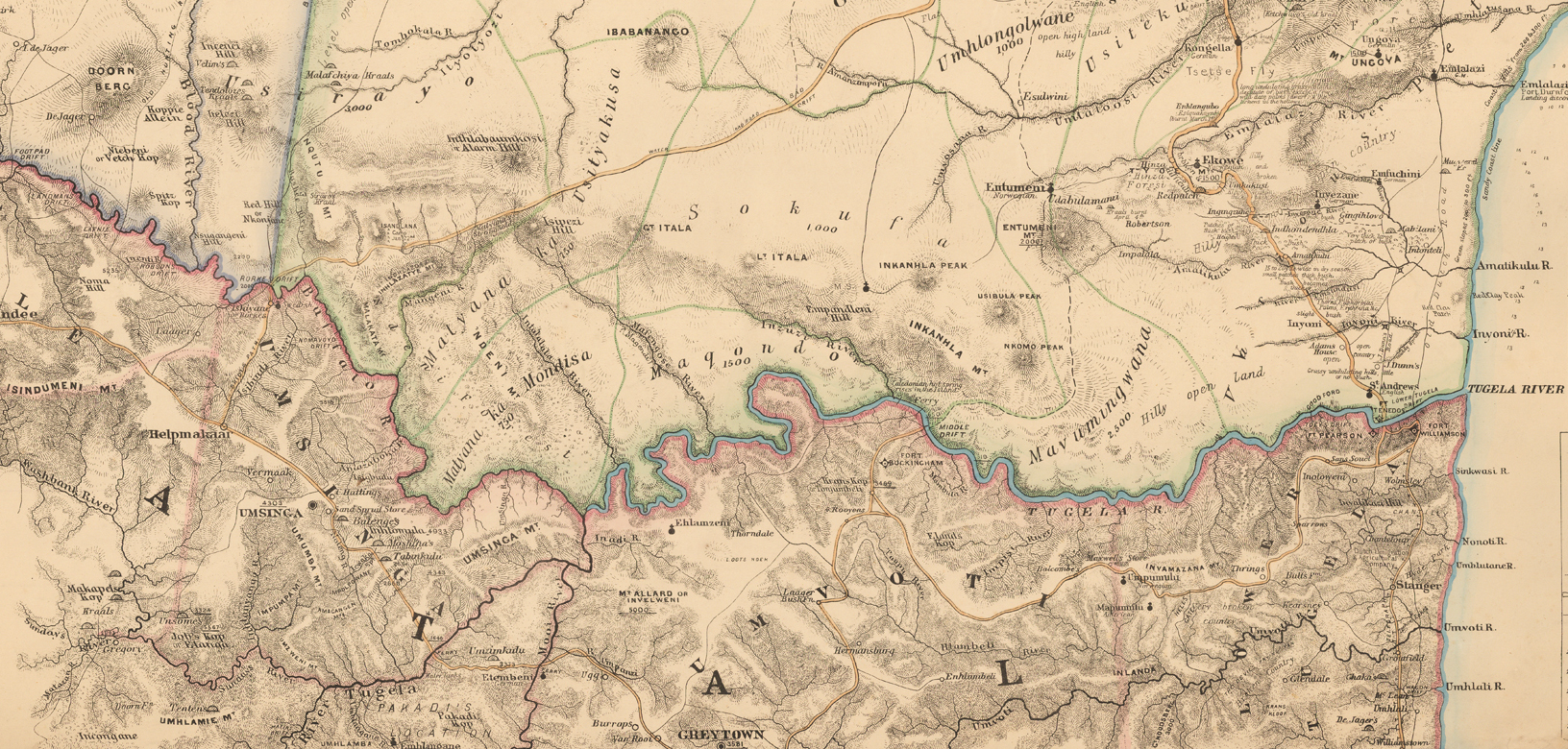
Map of the Zululand-Natal frontier in 1879

=== First invasion ===
The British invasion force crossed into Zululand on 11 January 1879 in three columns, on the same day Chelmsford placed the Natal border region under imperial military control and the commandants of Districts I, VI and VII were subordinated to British Army officers. At the outset of the war the Border Guard in the Sand Spruit Valley near to Umsinga were under the command of British Colonel Anthony Durnford who was tasked with defending the border at this location. Durnford was soon, however, ordered to move up to the border crossing at Rorke's Drift in support of Chelmsford's no. 3 column. On 22 January he was ordered to bring his men (not including the Border Guard) to the British camp at Isandlwana, within Zululand. Durnford and his men were wiped out in the British defeat at the Battle of Isandlwana later that day.

The same day as the battle, the commandant of District I was told by the leader of the unit stationed 8 miles (13 km) downstream from Rorke's Drift that a large Zulu force was massing at the Mangeni Valley to raid into Natal. The district commandant doubted this intelligence which came from a black Natal resident and was passed on by a farmer acting in a temporary capacity as a stand-in for a Border Guard officer. The district commandant gathered his Border Guard on the Natal side of the river to counter the threat but a reconnaissance party concluded that the informant had mistaken men of Chelmsford's 3rd Regiment of NNC for Zulu forces. They later assisted the men of the 2nd NNC under Harcourt Mortimer Bengough to cross the river. Bengough's battalion withdrew after learning of the British defeat and together with the Border Guard took steps to defend Natal.

=== Interim period ===
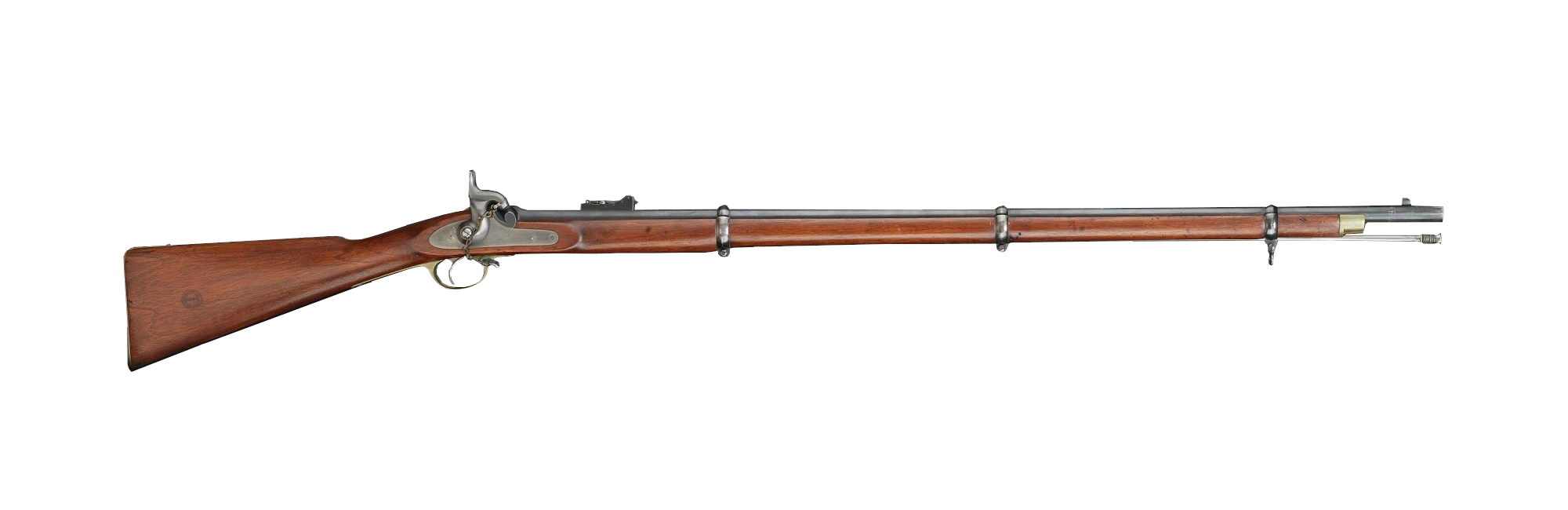
Pattern 1853 Enfield rifled musket

The defeat at Isandlwana and the collapse of the first invasion caused a general panic among the white population of Natal. They flocked to the laagers, erected improvised defences in their settlements or else fled to other territories such as the Orange Free State. In response to the defeat, the Border Guard was strengthened with additional levies from the interior regions of Natal. The Newcastle Scouts – an African mounted unit numbering some 50 men – was used to supplement the Border Guard and, until April when they were brought under imperial command, the Amangwani Scouts mounted unit formed part of the Border Guard reserve. In March the Ixopo Native Contingent, similar to but separate from the Border Guard, was raised in district IV and amounted to 800 infantrymen and 500 horsemen; they were soon moved to District VII where they erected Wolf Trap Fort near Kranskop. A number of Zulu-speaking interpreters were posted to the Border Guard on detachment from the Royal Durban Rifles. In April the unit received an issue of obsolete Pattern 1853 Enfield rifled muskets, sufficient to arm one quarter of the men.

In mid-April district VII had 596 active Border Guard, under 8 officers, with a further 1,500, under 8 officers, on reserve. Around the same time district I could field 2,969 men under 11 officers, having been supplemented with 600 men from the disbanded 3rd Regiment of the NNC (formally allocated to Weenan in District II) and by additional levies from Newcastle and Ladysmith. The Border Guard in District VI peaked at 2,323 black men and 33 white officers in late June; around this time the entire Border Guard amounted to around 7,700 men.

Chelmsford was keen for the Border Guard to act in an "active defence" role, carrying out raids in Zululand to create a buffer zone for defence of the colony. The Natal government disagreed with this, fearful of provoking retaliatory raids form the Zulu and agreeing with a general sentiment among the white settlers that colonial forces should not be risked across the border at a time when imperial troops were arriving to augment Chelmsford's force. Some detachments of the Border Guard were reinvigorated by the receipt of firearms and asked to join British forces on raids into Zululand but opposition from Bulwer and Frere confined them to the colony.

The Border Guard, under British command, had acted in support of a raid into Zululand in March by garrisoning the drifts on a 60-mile (97 km) stretch of river. Later in the month a unit was ordered by British Major Twentyman to cross the river and burn some Zulu homesteads but refused to do so, in accordance with their standing orders – though the Border Guard did exchange fire with a Zulu force across the river. Twentyman protested to the colonial authorities and requested that restrictions be dropped but this was to no avail. In April the Border Guard took possession of a fort – known as Fort Montgomery – at the Middle Drift that had been constructed by the NNC to support a raid in Zulu territory. During this time there were also Border Guard units at Mgonweni Drift, Kwelbomvu Drift, Shushu, Ngubana Drift and Mpisi Drift.

In District VI the Border Guard constructed Fort Lucas and is presumed to have built Thring's Post Fort, both of which they manned to guard the border country near the Tugela. A fallback position was established at Hullett's Stockade in Kearsney between the border posts and Stanger.

=== Second invasion ===
The British second invasion began on 31 May 1879. The Border Guard may have taken possession of Fort Bengough, between Greytown and Helpmekaar, from the 2nd Regiment NNC who took part in the invasion. The District VII Border Guard, dispersed to aid collection of the hut tax, proved unable to prevent a 25 June Zulu raid into Natal across the Middle Drift. A Zulu force of around 1,000 men brushed aside resistance from the Border Guard and Special Border Police and went on to burn 73 African settlements in Natal. The Zulu killed 30 civilians, burnt food stores and made off with large quantities of livestock. Nearby NNC troops were too slow to engage the Zulu but some of the Border Guard and Special Border Police rallied, re-engaged the Zulu and were successful in recovering some livestock. The Zulu raiding party returned home with almost 700 cattle and 800 goats and 40 prisoners. The raid caused another panic among the white population, demoralised the Border Guard and forced the British momentarily onto the defensive. The Ixopo Native Contingent directed to construct Fort Cross and Fort Liddle in the district to improve the defences, completed by early July.

In July some men of the Border Guard were drafted into an unarmed carrier corps to provide logistical support for the British column; the men proved less efficient than the previous method of ox wagon transport and the unit was soon disbanded. The dispute between Bulwer and Chelmsford over the deployment of the Border Guard came to an end on 15 July 1879 when Garnet Wolseley assumed the role of supreme British civil and military commander in the region. By this point the war had reached its end stages with British victory at the 4 July Battle of Ulundi and Wolseley disarmed the Border Guard by the end of the month. In August Henry Fynn, who had raised the Border Guard of the Umsinga region, negotiated the submission of the Zulu chiefs residing in the Buffalo River valley. The Natal troops were stood down in stages; the white volunteers were mustered out from July and the Border Guard and other levies from August, disbandment of the latter being completed by September. The NNC was also disbanded in September and the related Natal Pioneers in October, alongside the Special Border Police.

== Bibliography ==
- Castle, Ian (2003). Zulu War: Volunteers, Irregulars & Auxiliaries. Oxford: Osprey Publishing. ISBN 9781841764849.
- Dutton, Roy (2010). Forgotten Heroes Zulu & Basuto Wars including Medal Roll 1877–8–9. Infodial. ISBN 9780955655449.
- House of Commons (1879). Further Correspondence Respecting the Affairs of South Africa. London: Her Majesty's Stationery Office.
- Knight, Ian (2000). The Anglo-Zulu War, 1879. Archival Publications International. ISBN 9781903008003.
- Knight, Ian (2008). Companion to the Anglo-Zulu War. Pen and Sword. ISBN 9781844158010.
- Laband, John; Thompson, Paul (1983). Field Guide to the War in Zululand and the Defence of Natal 1879. Pietermaritzburg, South Africa: University of Natal Press. ISBN 0 86980 313 1.
- Laband, John (2009). Historical Dictionary of the Zulu Wars. Scarecrow Press. ISBN 9780810863002.
- Laband, John (2014). Zulu Warriors: The Battle for the South African Frontier. Yale University Press. ISBN 9780300206197.
- Thompson, Paul Singer (1997). The Natal Native Contingent in the Anglo-Zulu War, 1879. University of Natal. ISBN 9780620215244.
- Thompson, P. S. (2006). Black Soldiers of the Queen: The Natal Native Contingent in the Anglo-Zulu War. University of Alabama Press. ISBN 9780817353681.
- Snook, Colonel Mike (2010). How Can Man Die Better: The Secrets of Isandlwana Revealed. Frontline Books. ISBN 9781473815353.
