= KUPL =

Radio station in Portland, Oregon

- Portland, Oregon; United States
- Broadcast area: Portland metropolitan area
- Frequency: 98.7 MHz
- Branding: 98.7 The Bull

Programming
- Format: Country
- Affiliations: Premiere Networks

Ownership
- Owner: Connoisseur Media; (Alpha Media Licensee LLC)
- Sister stations: KBFF; KINK; KUFO; KXL-FM; KXTG

History
- First air date: June 6, 1948 (as KPOJ-FM)
- Former call signs: KPOJ-FM (1948–1968); KPOK-FM (1968–1973); KUPL-FM (1973–2010)
- Former frequencies: 98.7 MHz (1948–1964); 98.5 MHz (1964–1997)
- Call sign meaning: Couple; Portland

Technical information
- Licensing authority: FCC
- Facility ID: 4114
- Class: C1
- ERP: 25,000 watts
- HAAT: 502 meters (1,647 ft)
- Transmitter coordinates: 45°30′58″N 122°43′59″W

Links
- Public license information: Public file; LMS
- Webcast: Listen live; Listen live (via iHeartRadio)
- Website: www.987thebull.com

KUPL (98.7 FM) is a commercial radio station in Portland, Oregon. The station is owned by Connoisseur Media and airs a country music radio format, known as "98.7 The Bull".

KUPL's studios and offices are located in Downtown Portland on SW 5th Avenue. The transmitter is in Portland's West Hills, on SW Barnes Road.

== History ==
=== KPOJ-FM/KPOK-FM ===
On June 6, 1948, the station signed on as KPOJ-FM at 98.7 MHz. It was owned and operated by The Oregon Journal. It was powered at 44,000 watts and mostly simulcast co-owned KPOJ (1330 AM), a network affiliate of the Mutual Broadcasting System and the Don Lee Network.

KPOJ-FM moved one spot lower on the FM dial, to 98.5 MHz, on March 27, 1964. On August 15, 1968, KPOJ-FM changed its call sign to KPOK-FM. It played oldies and called itself "The Golden Sound". On June 18, 1973, KPOK-FM changed its format from oldies to beautiful music as "98-FM". On July 11, 1973, the call letters switched to KUPL-FM while AM 1330 aired country music, also using the KUPL call sign. The beautiful music on 98.5 lasted more than a decade.

=== Switch to country ===
In 1982, KUPL-AM-FM were acquired by Scripps Howard Broadcasting. On March 16, 1984, after 10 years as an easy listening station, KUPL-FM dropped the format and joined its AM counterpart as a country music station. KUPL AM had also previously broadcast easy listening since the late 1970s. In 1981, KUPL AM became a "Music of Your Life" affiliate, continuing with an easy listening format until 1984. The moniker for KUPL-FM was "K98, Continuous Hit Country". Later the station would be known as "Couple 98" by pronouncing the call letters KUPL.

In 1995, the AM station was sold for $2 million to Crawford Broadcasting, who switched it to a Christian radio format as KKPZ. The following year, KUPL-FM changed hands again, to American Radio Systems.

On September 4, 1997, KUPL-FM moved back from 98.5 MHz to 98.7 MHz, its original frequency. Over the course of the next decade the station would rebrand various times including 98.7 KUPL and New Country 98-7 KUPL. In 1998, KUPL-FM was acquired by CBS Radio.

=== Sale to Alpha Media ===
In August 2009, CBS sold its Portland cluster to newly formed Alpha Media. Radio vet Scott Mahalick was hired to program KUPL-FM. On September 16, 2010, the "-FM" suffix was removed from the station's callsign.

In March 2011, the station began using the slogan "98-7 KUPL, #1 For The Most New Country". On January 10, 2013, at midnight, the station dropped the "98-7 KUPL" branding for "98-7 The Bull." It only uses the actual callsign during legal station identifications.

Alpha Media merged with Connoisseur Media on September 4, 2025.

== See also ==
- List of radio stations in Oregon
