= KXTG =

Radio station in Portland, Oregon

- Portland, Oregon; United States
- Broadcast area: Portland metropolitan area
- Frequency: 750 kHz
- Branding: 750 The Game

Programming
- Format: Sports
- Affiliations: BetMGM Network; Westwood One Sports; Fox Sports Radio; NFL on Westwood One Sports; Portland Timbers

Ownership
- Owner: Connoisseur Media; (Alpha Media Licensee LLC)
- Sister stations: KBFF; KINK; KUFO; KUPL; KXL-FM

History
- First air date: December 13, 1926
- Former call signs: KXL (1926–2011)
- Former frequencies: 749.6 kHz (1926–1927); 770 kHz (2/1927-6/1927); 1360 kHz (1927–1928); 1250 kHz (1928–1929); 1420 kHz (1929–1941); 1450 kHz (3/1941-10/1941)
- Call sign meaning: "The Game"

Technical information
- Licensing authority: FCC
- Facility ID: 948
- Class: B
- Power: 50,000 watts days; 20,000 watts nights
- Transmitter coordinates: 45°24′4.2″N 122°26′50.7″W

Links
- Public license information: Public file; LMS
- Webcast: Listen live; Listen live (via iHeartRadio)
- Website: 750thegame.com

KXTG (750 AM, "The Game") is a commercial radio station licensed to Portland, Oregon, United States. It airs a sports radio format and is owned by Connoisseur Media, with studios on SW 5th Avenue in downtown Portland and transmitter sited off of SE Curtis Road in Damascus.

== History ==
=== Early years ===
The station signed on the air on December 13, 1926. The original call sign was KXL. In its earliest days, KXL would broadcast on different frequencies. By the 1930s, the station was heard on 1420 kHz, sharing time with KBPS, now on 1450 AM.

In that era, KXL's power was limited to 250 watts by day, 100 watts at night. The studios were in the Multnomah Hotel on Pine Street in Portland. With the enactment of the North American Regional Broadcasting Agreement (NARBA) in 1941, KXL moved to 750 AM and got a boost in power to 10,000 watts. On 750, KXL was a daytimer, required to go off the air at night to protect Class I‑A station WSB Atlanta from interference. KXL also relocated its studios to Washington Street.

=== Good Music ===
By the 1960s, the daytime power was increased to 50,000 watts. By day, KXL played an easy listening format it called "Good Music". Artists included Frank Sinatra, Peggy Lee, Perry Como, Nat King Cole, and Henry Mancini. But KXL was still silent after sunset due to restrictions on 750 AM.

On May 13, 1965, the FCC approved the $125,000 sale of KGMG, a station at 95.5 FM. It was bought by KXL's parent company, Seattle, Portland & Spokane Radio. Two months later, on July 5, 1965, KGMG became KXL-FM and began duplicating KXL's "Good Music" format as KXL & KXL-FM Stereo.

In 1970, KXL-AM-FM switched to a middle of the road (MOR) format as "KXL-FM Stereo 95". Most large city FM stations by the 1970s could not fully simulcast their AM stations, but this rule did not apply to AM stations that were daytimers. KXL and KXL-FM continued this practice through 1974 when KXL-FM began airing a separate format.

On March 26, 1999, 95.5 FM became KXJM, with a successful rhythmic contemporary format that lasted until May 12, 2008, when it switched formats to sports. The KXJM call letters, hip-hop format and all other intellectual property were acquired by CBS Radio and moved to 107.5 FM.

The FCC had relaxed restrictions on its clear channel frequencies. With Portland 2,100 miles (3,400 km) from Atlanta, KXL was allowed to broadcast around the clock, using a directional antenna powered at 20,000 watts at night.

=== Move KXL to FM 101.1 ===
In the early 2000s, KXL's news/talk format was becoming more popular. Management saw that some listeners wanted to hear its programming in clearer FM sound, so plans were made to switch KXL to the FM band.

KXL was bought by Alpha Broadcasting in 2009, along with sister station KXTG 95.5 FM. Alpha was headed by veteran radio executive Larry Wilson. At 8:47 a.m. on March 15, 2011, KXL started simulcasting on 101.1 FM, replacing the active rock format of KUFO. For two months, KXL's news/talk format was heard on both stations. Then at 4 p.m. on May 25, 2011, the 750 frequency switched from news/talk to sports, changing its branding to "750 The Game"; the format was moved from 95.5 FM, which became KBFF. On June 1, 2011, after 85 years as KXL, the station took on 95.5's former KXTG call sign to match "The Game" branding.

In 2013, KXTG switched affiliations from Fox Sports Radio to NBC Sports Radio. Fox Sports Radio is now on KPOJ, owned by iHeartMedia. In October 2015, KXTG switched affiliations from NBC Sports Radio to CBS Sports Radio. In 2024, CBS Sports Radio changed its name to the Infinity Sports Network.

=== FM translator ===
In July 2014, KXTG began simulcasting on FM translator K274AR 102.7 FM. On December 19, 2014, K274AR upgraded from 10 watts at 102.7 FM to 99 watts at 102.9 FM. On February 3, 2015, K274AR changed call letters to K275CH.

In August 2019, KXTG dropped its simulcast on the 102.9 FM translator frequency, due to a format change to hip hop music. KXTG's sports programming is now available on 750 AM, on the iHeartRadio platform and on the Alpha Media Player.

== Programming ==
KXTG is Portland’s flagship radio home of the Portland Timbers of Major League Soccer. It also carries Seattle Mariners baseball and broadcasts games from the NCAA March Madness tournament. The station served as the radio home of the Portland Steel (AFL) during the 2016 season.

John Canzano hosts The Bald Faced Truth weekday afternoons on KXTG; his show was the station’s inaugural sports program when the format launched on May 12, 2008, with guests including golfer Peter Jacobsen and then–U.S. Senator Barack Obama. In middays, the station airs nationally syndicated programming including The Dan Patrick Show and The Jim Rome Show, while network programming from the Infinity Sports Network and select shows from the BetMGM Network fill other weekday and weekend slots.

== Ownership history ==
From 1955 to 1998, KXL was owned and operated under Les Smith’s leadership; contemporaneous industry directories list Smith as licensee/owner during this period. After more than four decades of Smith’s stewardship, Rose City Radio, a company controlled by Portland Trail Blazers owner Paul Allen, acquired KXL and KXTG in 1998 in a deal reported at $42 million. In May 2009, Larry Wilson, the founder and former owner of Citadel Broadcasting, agreed to purchase KXL and KXTG from Rose City for approximately $11 million and organized the properties under newly formed Alpha Broadcasting (later part of Alpha Media). Alpha Media merged with Connoisseur Media on September 4, 2025.
