= CBS Radio =

American radio broadcasting company

CBS Radio Inc.
- Formerly: Infinity Broadcasting (1997–2005)
- Type: Subsidiary
- Industry: Radio broadcasting
- Predecessor: Infinity Broadcasting; Westinghouse Broadcasting; American Radio Systems
- Founded: September 18, 1927; 99 years ago (as United Independent Broadcasters); 1997; 29 years ago (relaunched as Infinity Broadcasting); 2005; 21 years ago (relaunched as CBS Radio)
- Defunct: November 17, 2017; 9 years ago
- Fate: Acquired by Entercom (now Audacy, Inc.)
- Successor: Entercom (now Audacy, Inc.)
- Headquarters: 345 Hudson Street; New York City, N.Y. 10014, U.S.
- Area served: Nationwide
- Key people: Andre Fernandez, president and chief executive officer

CBS Radio was a radio broadcasting company and radio network operator owned by CBS Corporation and founded in 1928, with consolidated radio station groups owned by CBS and Westinghouse Broadcasting/Group W since the 1920s, and Infinity Broadcasting since the 1970s. The broadcasting company was sold to Entercom (now known as Audacy, Inc.) on November 17, 2017.

Although CBS's involvement in radio dates back to the establishment of the original CBS Radio Network in 1927, the most recent radio division was formed by the 1997 acquisition of Infinity Broadcasting by CBS owner Westinghouse. In 1999, Infinity became a division of the original Viacom; in 2005, Viacom spun CBS and Infinity Broadcasting back into a separate company, and the division was renamed CBS Radio. It was the last radio group left to be tied to a major broadcast television network, as NBC divested its radio interests in the 1980s, and ABC sold off its division to Citadel Broadcasting (now part of Cumulus Media) in 2007.

== Early origins ==
CBS Radio is one of the oldest units within CBS Corporation, and has been around since 1928. However, the actual CBS Radio Network (now CBS News Radio) was launched in 1927, when CBS itself was known as United Independent Broadcasters. Columbia Records later joined in and that company was renamed the Columbia Phonographic Broadcasting System. In September 1927, Columbia Records sold the company to William S. Paley and in 1928, Paley streamlined the corporate name to Columbia Broadcasting System.

In 1940, Paley also joined forces with the journalist Edmund Chester at CBS Radio and Nelson Rockefeller at the Department of State's Office of the Coordinator of Inter-American Affairs to launch the imaginative Network of the Americas (La Cadena de las Americas) in 1942. This innovative radio network beamed both news and cultural programming live to North and South America in support of cultural diplomacy and Pan Americanism in accordance with President Franklin Roosevelt's Good Neighbor policy during World War II.

== History ==
The company that would become CBS Radio was founded in 1972 as Infinity Broadcasting Corporation by Michael A. Wiener and Gerald Carrus, with the acquisition of KOME, an FM radio station that served the San Francisco Bay Area. It became a publicly traded company twice, in 1986, and again in 1992.

Westinghouse Electric Corporation acquired CBS, Inc. in 1995 and then acquired Infinity Broadcasting in 1997. Westinghouse, which produced the first radio broadcast on November 2, 1920, with KDKA in Pittsburgh, Pennsylvania, would later change its name to CBS Corporation, and reorganize all of its radio properties (including its own Group W stations), as well as its outdoor advertising business, under the Infinity Broadcasting Corporation name. Westinghouse acquired American Radio Systems in September 1997. In 2000, CBS Corporation was merged into Viacom. On December 31, 2005, Viacom spun out its motion picture and cable television assets, with the remainder maintained as the second CBS Corporation. In anticipation of this, Infinity Broadcasting was reorganized as CBS Radio.

In August 2006, CBS Radio announced the sale of its 15 radio stations in Cincinnati, Ohio; Memphis, Tennessee; Austin, Texas; and Rochester, New York to Entercom Communications. This group deal was granted FCC approval in mid-November 2007 after it faced regulatory review and numerous challenges for over a year, and officially closed on November 30. Several other stations, most in smaller markets, were also sold to companies like Border Media Partners and Peak Media Corporation.

On April 30, 2008, CBS Radio and AOL entered a partnership (following the dissolution of partnership between AOL and XM Satellite Radio due to the change in Internet royalty rates). The AOL Radio player powered by CBS Radio featured over 200 CBS Radio stations, along with over 200 AOL Radio stations, combining two of the largest online radio networks and giving millions of listeners unlimited and free access to a diverse array of music and programming including news, sports and talk. These stations were folded into the AOL Radio mobile app.

In 2008, CBS started the process of paring down its station holdings, with a particular focus on ridding itself of stations in mid-sized markets, and markets where there are no television stations for synergistic advantages. On July 31, 2008, CBS Radio announced that it would sell 50 more radio stations in 12 mid-size markets. however some companies like RBC Capital Markets said CBS Radio is a "melting icecube" and that CBS Corporation would be better off selling the entire radio unit rather than "waiting a couple of years and selling the rest for less."

On December 15, 2008, CBS Radio and Clear Channel Communications reached an agreement to swap seven different stations. In this deal, Clear Channel acquired WQSR in Baltimore, Maryland, KBKS in Seattle, Washington, KLTH and KXJM in Portland, Oregon, and KQJK in Sacramento, California; and CBS Radio would get stations KHMX and KLOL in Houston, Texas. The deal closed on April 1, 2009. On December 20, 2008, CBS Radio announced that it would sell the entire Denver cluster (this includes three radio stations) to Wilks Broadcasting for $19.5 million, including KIMN, KWOF, and KXKL-FM.

On August 10, 2009, CBS Radio announced that it would sell the entire Portland cluster (this includes four radio stations) to Alpha Broadcasting for $40 million. The stations included in the sale are KCMD, KINK, KUFO, and KUPL.

On February 4, 2010, all CBS Radio stations, as well as AOL Radio and Yahoo! Music Radio restricted all non U.S. listeners from streaming online content. CBS Radio redirected to sister property Last.fm. In July 2010, CBS Radio launched Radio.com.

2011 saw the biggest AC format removal of the company dropping AC for hot adult contemporary on Washington, D.C.'s WIAD in March, followed by New York City's WWFS on October 12 (both in the Eastern Time Zone). On August 1, WCFS-FM Chicago removed its AC format for all-news to simulcast WBBM (AM). By November 2011, WLTE in Minneapolis/St. Paul removed the AC format for Christmas music, only to transition to country music as KMNB on December 26.

On April 9, 2012, CBS Radio announced that it was selling its West Palm Beach cluster of stations to Palm Beach Broadcasting for $50 million.

On December 1, 2014, CBS Radio traded 14 stations—its Charlotte, North Carolina and Tampa Bay clusters as well as WIP (now WTEL (AM)) in Philadelphia—to Beasley Broadcast Group in exchange for WRDW-FM (now WTDY-FM) and WXTU in Philadelphia and WKIS, WPOW, and WQAM in Miami.

In May 2016, Judge Percy Anderson ruled in favor of CBS Radio in a lawsuit filed by ABS Entertainment over the use of pre-1972 sound recordings, which are subject to common law state copyright and not federal law, on CBS Radio's oldies stations. ABS argued that because pre-1972 works are not subject to federal copyright, they are not subject to the federal laws providing compulsory licenses for performing the recordings on terrestrial radio and via non-interactive digital streams, and require permission. CBS, however, argued that it did not play pre-1972 sound recordings, but remastered versions of recordings published from compilations with copyrights registered after 1972, making them separate works subject to federal copyright and eligible for compulsory licenses. The court ruled that the remastered recordings contained "multiple kinds of creative authorship, such as adjustments of equalization, sound editing and channel assignment", with a level of creativity suitable enough to generate a new copyright.

=== Merger with Entercom ===
On March 15, 2016, CBS Corporation CEO Leslie Moonves stated that the company was exploring strategic alternatives that could result in the sale or spin-off of CBS Radio. Cumulus Media had been named as one of the potential buyers. In July 2016, CBS Radio filed for a planned IPO, which would have spun off the subsidiary as a separate, publicly traded company. On February 2, 2017, CBS Radio announced that it had agreed to merge with Entercom, at the time the fourth-largest radio broadcaster in the United States; the sale was to be conducted using a Reverse Morris Trust so that it would be tax-free. To comply with federal ownership limits Entercom had plans to divest 14 stations.

The transaction closed on November 17, 2017, ending the era of network-owned radio stations in America involving the original Big Three (ABC, NBC, and CBS). ABC, however, still owned a few stations outside its original network at the time, primarily under the ESPN Radio umbrella. Following the purchase, Entercom became the second-largest owner of radio stations in the United States in terms of revenue, with a total of 244 stations, and operations in 23 of the top 25 markets.

The CBS News Radio and CBS Sports Radio networks were not included in the sale. However, Entercom took over management of CBS Sports Radio, which continued to be broadcast by Entercom stations that carried its national programming. Hosts and employees of CBS Sports Radio – which later separated entirely from CBS, rebranding as Infinity Sports Network, then as Westwood One Sports – are now employees of Audacy, Inc. (formerly Entercom). CBS News Radio continued to operate as a division of CBS News but ceased broadcasting operations on May 22, 2026.

== Radio Brands and Programming ==
=== Howard Stern and Free FM ===
From 1985 to 2005, Infinity/CBS Radio was the home of controversial and top-rated talk show host Howard Stern, who left for subscription-based satellite radio due to increasing FCC and station censorship. In January 2006, rock star David Lee Roth, Rover's Morning Glory, and talk show host Adam Carolla replaced Stern in most major radio markets, and CBS Radio launched its new "Free FM" hot talk format in many of these markets. Roth's show was cancelled four months later and CBS Radio announced that Opie and Anthony of XM Radio would replace Roth on the stations that carried him, despite the irony that the two were fired after the sex act controversy inside of St. Patrick's Cathedral, New York. Adam Carolla's show was also later canceled.

On February 28, 2006, CBS Radio announced it had filed a lawsuit against Stern, his agent Don Buchwald, and Sirius, arguing that Stern promoted Sirius "to enrich himself unfairly". It also claimed that Stern "repeatedly and willfully" breached his contract with CBS, "misappropriated millions of dollars worth [of airtime]" for his own benefit and "fraudulently concealed" his performance-related interests in Sirius stock. The suit, filed in New York State Court, sought compensatory and punitive damages. Stern anticipated the suit, and earlier that day, prior to CBS' announcement, held a press conference, discussing how CBS added to the media attention, even booking him for appearances on Late Show with David Letterman and 60 Minutes. "I made them millions of dollars," Stern argued. "If I was hurting them, why did they keep me on the air for fourteen months? How can you have it both ways?" When a settlement was announced on May 26, 2006, Sirius gained exclusive rights to Stern's back catalogue of radio broadcasts at WXRK from November 1985 to December 2005, totalling almost 23,000 hours. The rights, costing Sirius approximately $2 million, equates to approximately $87 per-hour of tape.

As of 2009, the Free FM branding has been discontinued in all markets, and no former Free FM station continues to have a hot talk format. The only remaining show still on air is The Sports Junkies on WJFK 106.7 FM DC. All other shows broke up or were canceled. Some, including The Big O & Dukes Show and The Mike O'Meara Show, have been reborn as podcasts.

=== Jack FM ===
CBS Radio owned the majority of stations in the United States that broadcast the Jack FM format, a radio format that incorporates all types of popular music from the mid-50s to the present. These included stations in Los Angeles, Dallas, Seattle, Minneapolis and many other cities. New York City, Chicago and Houston had Jack FM stations, too; the New York City station, WCBS-FM has reverted to its traditional oldies format, mainly playing 80s rock, and Jack (which had been renamed ToNY) was carried on its HD2 subchannel.

=== AMP Radio ===
CBS Radio owned "AMP Radio", a branding created by KROQ-FM program director Kevin Weatherly and APD John Michael on the HD2 channel of KCBS-FM. Much like its competitor Kiss FM, AMP broadcasts contemporary hit radio/top 40 music. In February 2009, the first AMP station was launched in Los Angeles under the callsign KAMP-FM. Over the years, CBS Radio expanded the AMP brand and the CHR/Top 40 format to its stations in Detroit, Boston, Orlando, New York City, Philadelphia, and lastly Dallas. Since the Entercom acquisition in November 2017, all the stations in the aforementioned markets, except for the Los Angeles flagship station, gradually flipped formats. By 2021, the AMP Radio branding was discontinued.

=== Major League Baseball ===
CBS Radio was the largest broadcaster of local Major League Baseball broadcasts. In 2005 and 2007 respectively, CBS dropped the St. Louis Cardinals from KMOX and the Pittsburgh Pirates from KDKA, ending two long relationships between the teams and their flagship stations. However, KMOX reacquired the Cardinals' broadcast rights in 2011, and KDKA's FM sister all-sports station acquired the Pirates' broadcast rights in 2012, in addition to New York Yankees games being renewed on WCBS after the conclusion of the 2011 season, they would have the rights until the end of the 2013 season.

CBS's WFAN is the flagship station of the New York Yankees (they had broadcast the Mets until 2014) and WSCR is the flagship station of the Chicago Cubs. In Philadelphia, WPHT, a frequency that had been the longtime home of the Philadelphia Phillies before parting ways after the 2001 season, reacquired the team's broadcast rights in 2005. As of 2012, those games are now simulcast on sister station WIP-FM. KRLD-FM in Dallas was the flagship station for the Texas Rangers before the 2011 season.

In 2015, the Chicago Cubs moved its radio broadcasts to CBS property WBBM (AM) from its longtime home of WGN (AM). That same year, the Baltimore Orioles began its second stint on all-sports WJZ-FM, four years after it was moved back to its traditional home of WBAL (AM). In 2016, the Cubs rights moved to sister station WSCR as part of a pre-arrangement in the 2015 agreement where WSCR would take over airing games after letting the rights to the Chicago White Sox go after the 2015 season (which now broadcast on WGN).

== All-news radio stations ==
Prior to the merger with Entercom, CBS Radio operated nearly all of the all-news radio stations in the United States.

They included:

- KCBS in San Francisco
- KMOX in St. Louis (partial all-news)
- KNX in Los Angeles
- KRLD in Dallas (partial all-news)
- KYW in Philadelphia
- WBBM in Chicago
- WBZ in Boston
- WINS in New York
- WWJ in Detroit

As part of the merger and in order to comply with FCC Regulations, CBS Radio divested WBZ and ownership of that station was transferred to iHeartMedia.

== See also ==
- List of broadcast stations owned by CBS Radio
- Westinghouse Broadcasting (Group W), the broadcasting unit of Westinghouse.
- Infinity Broadcasting Corporation, the company before its reorganization by Westinghouse.
- Radio.com
- Last.fm
- La Cadena de las Americas
