= KXL-FM =

Radio station in Portland, Oregon

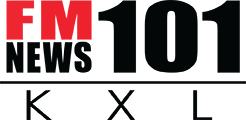
- Portland, Oregon; United States
- Broadcast area: Portland metropolitan area
- Frequency: 101.1 MHz
- Branding: FM News 101 KXL

Programming
- Format: News/talk
- Network: ABC News Radio
- Affiliations: Compass Media Networks; Premiere Networks; Radio America; Westwood One; KGW (news and weather partnership)

Ownership
- Owner: Connoisseur Media; (Alpha Media Licensee LLC)
- Sister stations: KBFF; KINK; KUFO; KUPL-FM; KXTG

History
- First air date: September 12, 1948 (as KOIN-FM)
- Former call signs: KOIN-FM (1948–1977); KYTE-FM (1977–1979); KLLB (1979–1983); KRCK (1983–1985); KYTE-FM (1985–1989); KKCY (1989–1990); KUFO (1990–2001); KUFO-FM (2001–2010); KUFO (2010–2011)

Technical information
- Licensing authority: FCC
- Facility ID: 26932
- Class: C
- ERP: 100,000 watts
- HAAT: 502 meters (1,647 ft)
- Transmitter coordinates: 45°30′57.4″N 122°44′3.4″W

Links
- Public license information: Public file; LMS
- Webcast: Listen live; Listen live (via iHeartRadio)
- Website: www.kxl.com

KXL-FM (101.1 MHz) is a commercial radio station in Portland, Oregon. It is owned by Connoisseur Media and broadcasts a news/talk radio format. The studios are on SW 5th Avenue in downtown Portland. KXL-FM is the flagship station for the nationally syndicated Lars Larson Show. In addition to news blocks in weekday AM and PM drive time, KXL-FM also carries syndicated shows from Chad Benson, Markley, Van Camp and Robbins, Red Eye Radio, This Morning, America's First News with Gordon Deal and America in the Morning.

KXL-FM has an effective radiated power (ERP) of 100,000 watts, the maximum for most FM stations in the U.S. The transmitter is on Barnes Road, a tower site shared with KATU.

== History ==
=== KOIN-FM ===
On September 12, 1948, the station signed on as KOIN-FM. It was the FM counterpart to KOIN (970 AM, now KUFO). The power was originally 48,600 watts, less than half the current output. KOIN-AM-FM mostly simulcast their programming, carrying the CBS Radio schedule of dramas, comedies, news and sports during the "Golden Age of Radio". As network programming moved from radio to television in the 1950s, KOIN-AM-FM switched to a full service, middle of the road format of news, sports and popular adult music, with the FM station sometimes broadcasting classical music in the evening.

In 1967, KOIN-FM ended the simulcast with 970 AM, and adopted a classical music format. From 1967 to 1977, the four-hour long KOIN Concert Hall was broadcast weeknights from 6 to 10 p.m., with hosts Blaine Hanks and later, Don Gay.

=== Top 40, country and oldies ===
In May 1977, the station changed its call sign to KYTE-FM and aired a Top 40 format as "The FM Kite" and "101 the FM KYTE". On January 5, 1979, KYTE-FM flipped to country music and changed the call letters to KLLB (as "Country Club 101").

On September 4, 1979, KLLB changed format to a mix of Top 40 and album rock as "KB-101 Rock Deluxe". Then, a year later, it changed to oldies, also calling itself "KB-101".

=== Rock, classical and smooth jazz ===
On November 8, 1982, KLLB switched to an album rock format as "Rock 101". A few months later, in January 1983, the call letters changed to KRCK.

On January 3, 1985, 101.1 returned to the same format it had in 1967, and became "Classical 101". On February 18, 1985, the call letters changed back to KYTE-FM. On January 30, 1989, the station changed its call letters to KKCY and aired a smooth jazz format, branded as "The City". (The classical format was moved to KYTE 970 AM.)

On December 29, 1989, at 5 p.m., after a few days of stunting, KKCY changed to an active rock format, and on January 23, 1990, the call letters were changed to KUFO, and on August 1, 2001, to KUFO-FM.

In August 2009, CBS Radio sold their Portland cluster (including KUFO) to Alpha Broadcasting in an effort to focus more on major market stations. On October 24, 2009, KUFO began stunting with a "mothership refueling" countdown to end at 7 a.m. on October 28 when it re-launched. The actual musical content of KUFO was the same as it was prior to the re-launch; only the personalities changed. On September 16, 2010, the call sign reverted to simply KUFO.

=== News/talk KXL ===
At 8:47 a.m. on March 15, 2011, KUFO's format was flipped to a simulcast of KXL (750 AM). The two stations aired KXL's news and talk programs. On March 22, 2011, KUFO changed its call sign to KXL-FM and billed itself as "News Radio 101 FM & 750 AM KXL". On the same day, the KUFO call letters moved to 970 AM for use on that station.

The slogan later became "FM News 101 KXL", with the AM's dial position not as prominent. This is the second FM station in Portland to use the name KXL-FM. Those call letters were used on FM 95.5 starting in 1965 when it carried a beautiful music format. (That station is now KBFF.)

On May 25, 2011, at 4 p.m., KXL-FM ended its simulcast with KXL, who flipped to sports as KXTG, "750 The Game".

On May 6, 2013, KXL-FM announced it had dropped its affiliation with Fox News Radio, and picked up CBS Radio News as its world and national news source. It also has a news and weather partnership with NBC affiliate KGW.

Alpha Media merged with Connoisseur Media on September 4, 2025.

On May 23, 2026, after the shutdown of CBS Radio News, KXL-FM switched its top-of-the-hour news to ABC News Radio. Its weather affiliation changed to local CBS affiliate KOIN.

== See also ==
- List of three-letter broadcast call signs in the United States
