= List of radio stations in Washington (state) =

The following is a list of FCC-licensed radio stations in the U.S. state of Washington, which can be sorted by their call signs, frequencies, cities of license, licensees, and programming formats.

== List of radio stations ==
Call sign	Frequency	City of License	Owner	Format
KACS	90.5 FM	Chehalis	Chehalis Valley Educational Foundation	Contemporary Inspirational
KACW	91.3 FM	South Bend	Chehalis Valley Educational Foundation	Contemporary Inspirational
KAFE	104.1 FM	Bellingham	Saga Broadcasting, LLC	Adult contemporary
KAGU	88.7 FM	Spokane	Gonzaga University Telecommunications Association	Classical music
KAHS-LP	106.5 FM	Aberdeen	Aberdeen School District #5	Variety
KAKP	101.3 FM	Pasco	Educational Media Foundation	Worship music (Air1)
KALE	960 AM	Richland	SMG - Tri-Cities, LLC	Contemporary Christian
KANY	107.3 FM	Cosmopolis	Jodesha Broadcasting, Inc.	Top 40 (CHR)
KAOS	89.3 FM	Olympia	The Evergreen State College	Variety
KAPL-FM	99.5 FM	Rock Island	Townsquare License, LLC	Adult contemporary
KAPS	660 AM	Mount Vernon	J & J Broadcasting, Inc.	Country
KAPY-LP	104.9 FM	Duvall	Valley Community Broadcasting	Adult Album Alternative
KARI	550 AM	Blaine	Way Broadcasting Licensee, LLC	Christian talk
KARY-FM	100.9 FM	Grandview	SMG-Yakima, LLC	Classic hits
KASB	89.3 FM	Bellevue	Bellevue School District #405	Alternative
KATS	94.5 FM	Yakima	Townsquare License, LLC	Mainstream rock
KAUC	89.7 FM	West Clarkston	Upper Columbia Media Corporation	Contemporary Christian
KAVZ-LP	102.5 FM	Deming	Van Zandt Community Hall Association	Variety
KAYB	88.1 FM	Sunnyside	American Family Association	Religious Talk (AFR)
KBAM	1400 AM	Longview	Bicoastal Media Licenses IV, LLC	Country
KBBD	103.9 FM	Spokane	SMG-Spokane, LLC	Adult hits
KBBO	1390 AM	Yakima	SMG-Yakima, LLC	Sports (FSR)
KBCS	91.3 FM	Bellevue	Bellevue College	Community radio
KBDB-FM	96.7 FM	Forks	Forks Broadcasting, Inc.	Adult contemporary
KBFG-LP	107.3 FM	Seattle	Fulcrum Community Communications	Variety
KBKS-FM	106.1 FM	Tacoma	iHM Licenses, LLC	Top 40 (CHR)
KBKW	1450 AM	Aberdeen	Sacred Heart Radio, Inc.	Catholic radio
KBLD	91.7 FM	Kennewick	Calvary Chapel of Tri-Cities	Contemporary Christian
KBLE	1050 AM	Seattle	Sacred Heart Radio, Inc.	Catholic radio
KBMS	1480 AM	Vancouver	Bennett Media Group, LLC	Urban adult contemporary
KBNW-FM	107.1 FM	Deer Park	Spokane Broadcasting Company, LLC	News/Talk
KBRC	1430 AM	Mount Vernon	J & J Broadcasting, Inc.	Classic rock
KBRD	680 AM	Lacey	BJ & Skip's for the Music	Adult standards
KBRO	1490 AM	Bremerton	Iglesia Pentecostal Vispera del Fin	Spanish Contemporary Christian
KBSG	90.1 FM	Raymond	Chevalis Valley Educational Foundation	Variety
KBSN	1470 AM	Moses Lake	Jacobs Radio Programming, LLC	News/Talk
KBUP	1240 AM	Olympia	Sacred Heart Radio, Inc.	Catholic radio
KBWN-LP	100.3 FM	Buena	Templo Pentecostes Monte de Sion	Spanish Religious
KCED	91.3 FM	Centralia	Centralia College, District 12, State of Washington	Alternative
KCHW	102.7 FM	Chewelah	Northeast Washington Community Radio Guild	Variety
KCIS	630 AM	Edmonds	Crista Ministries	Christian radio
KCLK	1430 AM	Asotin	Pacific Empire Radio Corporation	Sports (FSR)
KCLK-FM	94.1 FM	Clarkston	Pacific Empire Radio Corporation	Country
KCLX	1450 AM	Colfax	Inland Northwest Broadcasting, LLC	Classic country
KCMS	105.3 FM	Edmonds	Crista Ministries	Contemporary Christian
KCRK-FM	92.1 FM	Colville	North Country Broadcasting	Adult contemporary
KCSC-LP	101.9 FM	Mukilteo	Slavic Church 'Sulamita'	Religious Teaching
KCSH	88.9 FM	Ellensburg	LifeTalk Radio	Christian radio
KCSY	106.3 FM	Twisp	Resort Radio, LLC	Oldies
KCVL	1240 AM	Colville	North Country Broadcasting	Country
KCWU	88.1 FM	Ellensburg	Trustees of Central Washington University	College radio
KDBL	92.9 FM	Toppenish	Townsquare License, LLC	Country
KDDS-FM	99.3 FM	Elma	Bustos Media Holdings, LLC	Regional Mexican
KDIL-LP	105.7 FM	Kennewick	Foundation for Communication of Christian Faith and Culture	Religious Teaching
KDMB	88.7 FM	Moses Lake	Divine Mercy Broadcasting	Christian radio
KDNA	91.9 FM	Yakima	Northwest Communities Education Center	Spanish variety
KDOA-LP	97.5 FM	Vancouver	Rusting Sprocket Art	Variety
KDRK-FM	93.7 FM	Spokane	SMG-Spokane, LLC	Country
KDRM	99.3 FM	Moses Lake	Jacobs Radio Programming, LLC	Adult hits
KDUX-FM	104.7 FM	Hoquiam	Alpha Media Licensee LLC	Classic rock
KDYK	1020 AM	Union Gap	Centro Familiar Cristiano	Regional Mexican
KDYM	1230 AM	Sunnyside	Centro Familiar Cristiano	Spanish Adult hits
KEDO	1270 AM	Longview	Bicoastal Media Licenses IV, LLC	Talk/Sports
KEEH	104.9 FM	Spokane	Upper Columbia Media Association	Contemporary Christian
KEFA-LP	102.9 FM	Wenatchee	Cor Christi Academy	Catholic
KEGX	106.5 FM	Richland	SMG - Tri-Cities, LLC	Classic rock
KEIT-LP	100.7 FM	Colville	Colville Family Radio	Christian
KELA	1470 AM	Centralia-Chehalis	Bicoastal Media Licenses IV, LLC	News/Talk
KETL-LP	100.5 FM	Republic	Ferry County Radio Inc.	Christian
KEWU-FM	89.5 FM	Cheney	Eastern Washington University	Oldies
KEXP-FM	90.3 FM	Seattle	Friends of KEXP	Alternative
KEYF-FM	101.1 FM	Cheney	SMG-Spokane, LLC	Classic hits
KEYW	98.3 FM	Pasco	Townsquare License, LLC	Hot adult contemporary
KEZE	96.9 FM	Spokane	Queenb Radio, Inc.	Rhythmic contemporary
KFAC-LP	105.5 FM	Twisp	American Legion Post 0143 Methow Valley	Variety
KFAE-FM	89.1 FM	Richland	Washington State University	Public radio, Classical
KFBW	105.9 FM	Vancouver	iHM Licenses, LLC	Mainstream rock
KFFM	107.3 FM	Yakima	Townsquare License, LLC	Top 40 (CHR)
KFIO-FM	106.5 FM	Dishman	Liberty Broadcasting System, LLC	Religious
KFLD	870 AM	Pasco	Townsquare License, LLC	News/Talk
KFOO-FM	96.1 FM	Opportunity	iHM Licenses, LLC	Alternative rock
KFUZ-LP	103.3 FM	Clarkston	Clarkston Catholic Radio	Catholic
KFXP-LP	98.7 FM	Wenatchee	St. Francis Xavier Gift Shop	Catholic
KGA	1510 AM	Spokane	SMG-Spokane, LLC	Sports (FSR)
KGDC	1320 AM	Walla Walla	Two Hearts Communications, LLC	News/Talk
KGDN	93.9 FM	Ephrata	Tacoma Broadcasters, Incorporated	Christian radio
KGHE	89.1 FM	Montesano	Grays Harbor Institute	Classical music
KGHI	91.5 FM	Westport	Grays Harbor Institute	Classical music
KGHO-LP	99.9 FM	Hoquiam	Grays Harbor LPFM	Oldies
KGHP	89.9 FM	Gig Harbor	Peninsula School District No. 401	Variety
KGMI	790 AM	Bellingham	Saga Broadcasting, LLC	News/Talk
KGNW	820 AM	Burien	Inspiration Media	Christian radio
KGRG	1330 AM	Enumclaw	Green River Foundation	College radio
KGRG-FM	89.9 FM	Auburn	Green River Community College	College radio
KGTC-LP	93.1 FM	Oroville	Ruth's House of Hope	Christian Contemporary
KGTK	920 AM	Olympia	KITZ Radio, inc.	Talk
KGTS	91.3 FM	College Place	Walla Walla University	Contemporary Christian
KHHK	99.7 FM	Yakima	SMG-Yakima, LLC	Rhythmic contemporary
KHHO	850 AM	Tacoma	iHM Licenses, LLC	Black-oriented news
KHNW	88.3 FM	Manson	Washington State University	Public radio, Classical
KHTP	103.7 FM	Tacoma	Audacy License, LLC	Rhythmic adult contemporary
KHTR	104.3 FM	Pullman	Radio Palouse, Inc	Country
KHUH-LP	104.9 FM	Seattle	Hollow Earth Radio	Variety
KIEV-LP	102.7 FM	Camas	Outlaw Music Association	Classic country
KING-FM	98.1 FM	Seattle	Classic Radio, Inc.	Classical music
KIOK	94.9 FM	Richland	SMG - Tri-Cities, LLC	Country
KIRO	710 AM	Seattle	Bonneville International	Sports (ESPN)
KIRO-FM	97.3 FM	Tacoma	Bonneville International	News/Talk
KISC	98.1 FM	Spokane	iHM Licenses, LLC	Adult contemporary
KISM	92.9 FM	Bellingham	Saga Broadcasting, LLC	Classic rock
KISW	99.9 FM	Seattle	Audacy License, LLC	Mainstream rock
KIT	1280 AM	Yakima	Townsquare License, LLC	News/Talk
KITI	1420 AM	Centralia	Premier Broadcasters, Inc.	Oldies
KITI-FM	95.1 FM	Winlock	Premier Broadcasters, Inc.	Hot adult contemporary
KITZ	1400 AM	Silverdale	KITZ Radio, Inc.	Talk
KIXI	880 AM	Mercer Island-Seattle	Seattle FCC License Sub, LLC	Adult standards
KJAQ	96.5 FM	Seattle	iHM Licenses, LLC	Adult hits
KJCF	89.3 FM	Asotin	CSN International	Christian radio
KJEB	95.7 FM	Seattle	iHM Licenses, LLC	Classic hits
KJEM	89.9 FM	Pullman	Washington State University	Jazz
KJET	105.7 FM	Union	Jodesha Broadcasting, Inc.	Adult contemporary
KJHS-LP	107.9 FM	Wenatchee	Cor Christi	Catholic Spanish
KJMR-LP	97.7 FM	Chattaroy	Ntrepid Group	Variety
KJOX	1340 AM	Kennewick	SMG - Tri-Cities, LLC	Sports (ESPN)
KJR	950 AM	Seattle	iHM Licenses, LLC	Sports (FSR)
KJR-FM	93.3 FM	Seattle	iHM Licenses, LLC	Sports
KJRB	790 AM	Spokane	SMG-Spokane, LLC	Mainstream rock
KJVH	89.5 FM	Longview	Family Stations, Inc.	Christian radio (Family Radio)
KJYR	104.5 FM	Newport	Growing Christian Foundation	Contemporary Christian
KKDZ	1250 AM	Kent	Akal Media KKDZ, Inc.	South Asian
KKMO	1360 AM	Tacoma	Sea-Mar Community Health Center	Regional Mexican
KKNW	1150 AM	Seattle	Seattle FCC License Sub, LLC	Classic country
KKOL	1300 AM	Seattle	Inspiration Media, Inc.	Conservative talk
KKOV	1550 AM	Vancouver	Intelli LLC	Brokered Foreign language
KKRS	97.3 FM	Davenport	Penfold Communications, Inc.	Christian radio
KKRT	900 AM	Wenatchee	Alpha Media Licensee LLC	Sports (ESPN)
KKRV	104.7 FM	Wenatchee	Alpha Media Licensee LLC	Country
KKSR	95.7 FM	Walla Walla	SMG - Tri-Cities, LLC	Classic hits
KKWF	100.7 FM	Seattle	Audacy License, LLC	Country
KKWN	106.7 FM	Cashmere	Townsquare License, LLC	News/Talk
KKXA	1520 AM	Snohomish	CAAM Partnership, LLC	Classic country
KKZX	98.9 FM	Spokane	iHM Licenses, LLC	Classic rock
KLAY	1180 AM	Lakewood	Sacred Heart Radio, Inc.	News/Talk
KLCK	1400 AM	Goldendale	Gorge Country Media, Inc.	Talk
KLDY	1280 AM	Lacey	Iglesia Pentecostal Vispera del Fin	Spanish Contemporary Christian
KLFE	1590 AM	Seattle	Relevant Radio, Inc.	Catholic
KLGW	98.5 FM	Grand Coulee	Educational Media Foundation	Contemporary Christian (K-Love)
KLMY	99.7 FM	Long Beach	OMG FCC Licenses LLC	Hot adult contemporary
KLOG	1490 AM	Kelso	Washington Interstate Broadcasting Company, Inc.	Classic hits
KLOI-LP	102.9 FM	Lopez Island	The Gathering of Island Voices and Expressions	Variety
KLOY	88.7 FM	Ocean Park	Educational Media Foundation	Contemporary Christian (K-Love)
KLSW	104.5 FM	Covington	Educational Media Foundation	Contemporary Christian (K-Love)
KLSY	93.7 FM	Montesano	Centro Familiar Cristiano	Spanish Contemporary Christian
KLUW	88.1 FM	East Wenatchee	Educational Media Foundation	Contemporary Christian (K-Love)
KLWA	101.3 FM	Westport	Educational Media Foundation	Contemporary Christian (K-Love)
KLWO	90.3 FM	Longview	Educational Media Foundation	Contemporary Christian (K-Love)
KLWS	91.5 FM	Moses Lake	Washington State University	Public radio
KLYK	94.5 FM	Kelso	Bicoastal Media Licenses IV, LLC	Hot adult contemporary
KMAS	1030 AM	Shelton	iFiber Communications Corporation	Full service classic hits
KMAX	840 AM	Colfax	Inland Northwest Broadcasting, LLC	News/Talk
KMBI-FM	107.9 FM	Spokane	The Moody Bible Institute of Chicago	Christian radio
KMGP-LP	101.1 FM	Magnuson Park	Sand Point Arts and Cultural Exchange	Variety
KMGW	99.3 FM	Naches	Townsquare License, LLC	Classic hits
KMIA	1210 AM	Auburn-Federal Way	Bustos Media Holdings, LLC	Spanish Religious
KMIH	88.9 FM	Mercer Island	Mercer Island School District #400	Adult album alternative
KMLW	88.3 FM	Moses Lake	The Moody Bible Institute of Chicago	Christian radio
KMMG	96.7 FM	Benton City	Bustos Media Holdings, LLC	Regional Mexican
KMNA	98.7 FM	Mabton	Bustos Media Holdings, LLC	Regional Mexican
KMNT	104.3 FM	Chehalis	Bicoastal Media Licenses IV, LLC	Country
KMRE	88.3 FM	Bellingham	Kulshan Community Media	Community radio
KMTT	910 AM	Vancouver	Audacy License, LLC	Sports (ESPN)
KMWS	89.7 FM	Mount Vernon	Washington State University	Public radio
KNBQ	98.5 FM	Central Park	Educational Media Foundation	Contemporary Christian (K-Love)
KNCW	92.7 FM	Omak	North Cascades Broadcasting, Inc.	Country
KNDD	107.7 FM	Seattle	Audacy License, LLC	Alternative rock
KNHC	89.5 FM	Seattle	Seattle Public Schools	Dance Top 40
KNKX	88.5 FM	Tacoma	Friends of 88.5 FM	Public radio and Jazz
KNRK	94.7 FM	Camas	Audacy License, LLC	Alternative rock
KNTS	1680 AM	Seattle	Baaz Broadcasting Corp.	South Asian
KNWN	1000 AM	Seattle	Lotus Seattle Corp.	News
KNWN-FM	97.7 FM	Oakville	Lotus Seattle Corp.	News
KNWP	90.1 FM	Port Angeles	Washington State University	Public radio, Classical
KNWR	90.7 FM	Ellensburg	Washington State University	Public radio, Classical
KNWU	91.5 FM	Forks	Washington State University	Public radio, Classical
KNWV	90.5 FM	Clarkston	Washington State University	Public radio, Classical
KNWY	90.3 FM	Yakima	Washington State University	Public radio, Classical
KODX-LP	96.9 FM	Seattle	Earth on-the-Air Independent Media	News
KOHO-FM	101.1 FM	Leavenworth	Icicle Broadcasting, Inc.	Jazz
KOLU	90.1 FM	Pasco	First Baptist Church of Riverview	Christian radio
KOMQ	88.5 FM	Omak	Spokane Public Radio, Inc.	Public radio
KOMW	680 AM	Omak	North Cascades Broadcasting, Inc.	Adult standards
KONA	610 AM	Kennewick	Townsquare License, LLC	News/Talk
KONA-FM	105.3 FM	Kennewick	Townsquare License, LLC	Top 40 (CHR)
KONP	1450 AM	Port Angeles	Radio Pacific, Inc.	News/Talk
KORD-FM	102.7 FM	Richland	Townsquare License, LLC	Country
KORE-LP	99.1 FM	Entiat	Community Oriented Radio Endeavours	Variety
KOUG-LP	107.5 FM	Pullman	St. Thomas More Catholic Student Center - Pullman	Catholic
KOUV-LP	107.9 FM	Vancouver	Recording NW	Variety
KOYS-LP	94.1 FM	Bellingham	Radio Vida N Life Inc	Spanish Religious
KOZI	1230 AM	Chelan	Chelan Valley Media Group LLC	News/Talk
KOZI-FM	93.5 FM	Chelan	Chelan Valley Media Group LLC	Adult contemporary
KPBG	90.9 FM	Oroville	Spokane Public Radio, Inc.	Public radio
KPBW	91.9 FM	Brewster	Spokane Public Radio, Inc.	Public radio
KPBX-FM	91.1 FM	Spokane	Spokane Public Radio, Inc.	Public radio
KPBZ	90.3 FM	Spokane	Spokane Public Radio, Inc.	Public radio
KPLI	90.1 FM	Olympia	Friends of 88.5 FM	Public radio and Jazz
KPLK	88.9 FM	Sedro-Woolley	Friends of 88.5 FM	Public radio and Jazz
KPLP	104.5 FM	White Salmon	Walla Walla University	Contemporary Christian
KPLW	89.9 FM	Wenatchee	Growing Christian Foundation	Contemporary Christian
KPLZ-FM	101.5 FM	Seattle	Lotus Seattle Corp.	Country
KPND	95.3 FM	Deer Park	Blue Sky Broadcasting Inc.	Adult album alternative
KPNW-FM	98.9 FM	Seattle	Seattle FCC License Sub, LLC	Country
KPQ	560 AM	Wenatchee	Townsquare License, LLC	News/Talk
KPQ-FM	102.1 FM	Wenatchee	Townsquare License, LLC	Classic rock
KPTR	1090 AM	Seattle	iHM Licenses, LLC	Conservative talk
KPTZ	91.9 FM	Port Townsend	Radio Port Townsend	Educational
KPUG	1170 AM	Bellingham	Saga Broadcasting, LLC	Sports (ESPN)
KQBC	90.5 FM	Benton City	Radio 74 Internationale	Religious
KQES-LP	101.9 FM	Bellevue	NTD Public TV Seattle	Ethnic/Chinese
KQFO	100.1 FM	Pasco	Alcon Media LLC	Regional Mexican
KQMV	92.5 FM	Bellevue	Seattle FCC License Sub, LLC	Top 40 (CHR)
KQNT	590 AM	Spokane	iHM Licenses, LLC	News/Talk
KQOW	90.3 FM	Bellingham	University of Washington Board of Regents	Public radio
KQQQ	1150 AM	Pullman	Radio Palouse, Inc.	News/Talk
KQWS	90.1 FM	Omak	Washington State University	Public radio
KQWZ-LP	106.5 FM	Seatac	OneAmerica	Silent
KQXI	91.5 FM	Granite Falls	CSN International, Inc.	Christian radio
KRAO-FM	102.5 FM	Colfax	Inland Northwest Broadcasting, LLC	Classic hits
KRCW	96.3 FM	Royal City	Bustos Media Holdings, LLC	Regional Mexican
KRIZ	1420 AM	Renton	Bennett Media Group, LLC	Urban adult contemporary
KRKL	93.3 FM	Walla Walla	Educational Media Foundation	Contemporary Christian (K-Love)
KRKO	1380 AM	Everett	S-R Broadcasting Co., Inc.	Classic hits
KRKZ-FM	94.3 FM	Chinook	Meadows Broadcasting, LLC	Classic hits
KRLF	88.5 FM	Pullman	Living Faith Fellowship Educational Ministries	Contemporary Christian
KROH	91.1 FM	Port Townsend	Olympic Media	Christian radio
KRPA	1110 AM	Oak Harbor	New Age Media Ltd.	Asian
KRPI	1550 AM	Ferndale	BBC Broadcasting, Inc.	News/Talk and Music
KRQT	107.1 FM	Castle Rock	Bicoastal Media Licenses IV, LLC	Classic rock
KRSC	1400 AM	Othello	Centro Familiar Cristiano	Unknown (Spanish language)
KRSE	105.7 FM	Yakima	SMG-Yakima, LLC	Classic rock
KRSX	95.9 FM	Goldendale	Gorge Country Media, Inc.	Adult contemporary
KRWM	106.9 FM	Bremerton	Seattle FCC License Sub, LLC	Adult contemporary
KRWW-LP	96.3 FM	Walla Walla	Iglesia Caminante de Las Asambleas de Dios	Spanish Religious
KRXY	94.5 FM	Shelton	Olympia Broadcasters, Inc.	Full service classic hits
KSAE-LP	94.3 FM	Kennewick	Church of the Salvation Arc	Religious Teaching
KSBC	88.3 FM	Nile	Gutierrez Communications	Contemporary Christian (K-Love)
KSBN	1230 AM	Spokane	KSBN Radio, Inc.	News/Talk
KSER	90.7 FM	Everett	KSER Foundation	News/Talk and Public affairs
KSFC	91.9 FM	Spokane	Spokane Public Radio, Inc.	Public radio
KSOH	89.5 FM	Wapato	LifeTalk Radio, Inc.	Christian radio
KSPO (AM)	1050 AM	Dishman	Liberty Broadcasting System, LLC	Christian radio
KSQM	91.5 FM	Sequim	Sequim Community Broadcasting	Educational
KSTI	102.1 FM	Port Angeles	Radio Pacific, Inc.	Country
KSUH	1450 AM	Puyallup	Jean J. Suh	Unknown (Korean language)
KSVM-LP	103.9 FM	Walla Walla	Assumption of the Blessed Virgin Mary Catholic Parish	Catholic
KSVR	91.7 FM	Mount Vernon	Board of Trustees of Skagit Valley College	Regional Mexican and Variety
KSVU	90.1 FM	Hamilton	Board of Trustees of Skagit Valley College	Variety
KSWD	94.1 FM	Seattle	Audacy License, LLC	Hot adult contemporary
KSWS	88.9 FM	Chehalis	Washington State University	Public radio
KSWW	102.1 FM	Ocean Shores	Jodesha Broadcasting, Inc.	Adult contemporary
KTAH-LP	101.9 FM	Tacoma	Radio Tacoma	Variety
KTBI	810 AM	Ephrata	Tacoma Broadcasters, Incorporated	Christian radio
KTCR	980 AM	Selah	SMG-Yakima, LLC	Oldies
KTCV	88.1 FM	Kennewick	Kennewick School District No. 17	Alternative
KTDD	104.9 FM	Eatonville	W247 Broadcasting LLC	Contemporary Christian
KTEL	1490 AM	Walla Walla	EMG2, LLC	News/talk
KTFJ-LP	104.7 FM	Burlington	Skagit Valley Family Radio	Christian
KTJC	91.1 FM	Kelso	CSN International	Christian radio (CSN International)
KTNH-LP	107.3 FM	Walla Walla	Walla Walla Catholic Radio	Religious Teaching
KTQA-LP	95.3 FM	Tacoma	The Interest Compound (New Board)	Old time radio
KTQR	88.7 FM	Forks	Truth Quest Radio	
KTRI	93.5 FM	Royal City	Jacobs Radio Programming, LLC	Country
KTRJ-LP	93.7 FM	Winthrop	Methow Valley Radio	Christian/Variety
KTRT	97.5 FM	Winthrop	KTRT Radio, Inc.	Americana
KTRW	630 AM	Opportunity	Mutual Broadcasting System, LLC	Adult standards
KTSL	101.9 FM	Medical Lake	Educational Media Foundation	Worship music (Air1)
KTTH	770 AM	Seattle	Bonneville International Corporation	News/Talk
KTTO	970 AM	Spokane	Sacred Heart Radio, Inc.	Christian radio
KTWP	91.1 FM	Twisp	Spokane Public Radio, Inc.	Public radio
KTYG-LP	106.7 FM	Centralia	Lewis County Educational Broadcasting	Religious Teaching
KUBS	91.5 FM	Newport	Newport Consolidated School District #56415	Country
KUCC	88.1 FM	Clarkston	Upper Columbia Media Foundation	Contemporary Christian
KUCP-LP	100.3 FM	Kent	Ukrainian Church of Evangelical Faith	Ethnic/Ukrainian
KUGS	89.3 FM	Bellingham	Western Washington University	Freeform
KUJ	1420 AM	Walla Walla	Alexandra Communications, Inc.	Regional Mexican
KUJ-FM	99.1 FM	Burbank	SMG - Tri-Cities, LLC	Top 40 (CHR)
KUKN	105.5 FM	Longview	Washington Interstate Broadcasting, Inc.	Country
KULE	730 AM	Ephrata	Centro Familiar Cristiano	Talk
KUOW	1340 AM	Tumwater	University of Washington Board of Regents	Public radio
KUOW-FM	94.9 FM	Seattle	The University of Washington	Public radio
KUPS	90.1 FM	Tacoma	University of Puget Sound	Freeform
KUVB-LP	103.3 FM	Leavenworth	Our Lady of the Snows Catholic Church	Catholic
KVAB	102.9 FM	Clarkston	Pacific Empire Radio Corporation	Classic rock
KVAN	1560 AM	Burbank	Centro Familiar Cristiano	News/Talk
KVAS-FM	103.9 FM	Ilwaco	OMG FCC Licenses LLC	Country
KVFS-LP	100.3 FM	Spokane	Spokane Translator Association	Variety
KVI	570 AM	Seattle	Lotus Seattle Corp.	Talk
KVIX	89.3 FM	Port Angeles	Friends of 88.5 FM	Public radio and Jazz
KVRI	1600 AM	Blaine	Way Broadcasting Licensee, LLC	News/Talk and Music (Indian languages)
KVRU-LP	105.7 FM	Seattle	SouthEast Effective Development	Variety
KVSG-LP	107.1 FM	Twisp	St. Genevieve Catholic Parish – Twisp	Catholic
KVSH-LP	101.9 FM	Vashon	Voice of Vashon	Variety
KVTI	90.9 FM	Tacoma	Clover Park Technical College	Public radio, Classical
KWAO	88.1 FM	Vashon	Educational Media Foundation	Worship music (Air1)
KWCW	90.5 FM	Walla Walla	ASWC Radio Committee	College radio
KWEW-LP	96.3 FM	Wenatchee	Wenatchee Youth Radio	Christian radio
KWFJ	89.7 FM	Roy	Bible Broadcasting Network, Inc.	Conservative Christian radio
KWHJ-LP	92.3 FM	Newport	White Horse Media	Religious (Radio 74 International)
KWIQ	1020 AM	Moses Lake North	Alpha Media Licensee LLC	Sports (ESPN)
KWIQ-FM	100.5 FM	Moses Lake	Alpha Media Licensee LLC	Country
KWJD-LP	92.1 FM	Onalaska	Valley Life Broadcasting, Inc.	Religious Teaching
KWJZ-LP	107.3 FM	High Rock	Continental Broadcasting	Oldies
KWLE	1340 AM	Anacortes	New Age Media Ltd.	Punjabi music
KWLN	103.3 FM	Wilson Creek	Alpha Media Licensee LLC	Unknown (Spanish language)
KWNC	1370 AM	Quincy	Townsquare License, LLC	Talk
KWOK	1490 AM	Aberdeen	Alpha Media Licensee LLC	Sports (FSR)
KWPZ	106.5 FM	Lynden	Crista Ministries, Inc.	Contemporary Christian
KWSU	1250 AM	Pullman	Washington State University	Public radio
KWWS	89.7 FM	Walla Walla	Washington State University	Public radio
KWWW-FM	96.7 FM	Quincy	Townsquare License, LLC	Top 40 (CHR)
KWYZ	1230 AM	Everett	Jean J. Suh	Unknown (Korean language)
KXAA	100.3 FM	Cle Elum	Divine Mercy Broadcasting	Religious
KXDD	104.1 FM	Yakima	SMG-Yakima, LLC	Country
KXIR	89.9 FM	Freeland	KSER Foundation	Variety
KXLE	1240 AM	Ellensburg	KXLE, Inc.	News/Talk
KXLE-FM	95.3 FM	Ellensburg	KXLE, Inc.	Country
KXLX	700 AM	Airway Heights	Queenb Radio, Inc.	Sports (ESPN)
KXLY	920 AM	Spokane	Queenb Radio, Inc.	News/Talk
KXLY-FM	99.9 FM	Spokane	Queenb Radio, Inc.	Country
KXPA	1540 AM	Bellevue	Multicultural Radio Broadcasting Licensee, LLC	Brokered time
KXPB-LP	89.1 FM	Pacific Beach	Pacific Beach Food Bank	Variety
KXRO	1320 AM	Aberdeen	Alpha Media Licensee LLC	News/Talk
KXRW-LP	99.9 FM	Vancouver	Media Institute for Social Change	Variety
KXRX	97.1 FM	Walla Walla	Townsquare License, LLC	Mainstream rock
KXSU-LP	102.1 FM	Seattle	Seattle University	Variety
KXXK	95.3 FM	Hoquiam	Alpha Media Licensee LLC	Country
KXXO	96.1 FM	Olympia	3 Cities, Inc.	Adult contemporary
KYAK	930 AM	Yakima	Thomas W. Read d/b/a Yakima Christian Broadcasting	Christian radio
KYFQ	91.7 FM	Tacoma	Bible Broadcasting Network, Inc.	Conservative Christian radio
KYIZ	1620 AM	Renton	Bennett Media Group, LLC	Urban contemporary
KYKV	103.1 FM	Selah	Educational Media Foundation	Contemporary Christian (K-Love)
KYNR	1490 AM	Toppenish	Confederated Tribes and Bands of the Yakama Nation	Variety
KYOZ	1330 AM	Spokane	247 Media Ministries	Worship music
KYPL	91.1 FM	Yakima	Growing Christian Foundation	Contemporary Christian
KYRF-LP	107.9 FM	Yakima	Tabernaculo de la Fe	Spanish Religious
KYRS	88.1 FM	Medical Lake	Thin Air Community Radio	Variety
KYSN	97.7 FM	East Wenatchee	Townsquare License, LLC	Country
KYSP	1340 AM	Wenatchee	Townsquare License, LLC	Sports (FSR)
KYTR	88.1 FM	Union Gap	Sacred Heart Radio, Inc.	Catholic Religious
KYVT	88.5 FM	Yakima	Yakima District No. 7	Alternative
KYXE	104.9 FM	Union Gap	Bustos Media Holdings, LLC	Regional Mexican
KYYO	96.9 FM	McCleary	KGY, Inc	Country
KYYR-LP	97.9 FM	Yakima	Calvary Chapel Yakima Valley	Religious Teaching
KYYT	102.3 FM	Goldendale	Gorge Country Media, Inc.	Country
KZAL	94.7 FM	Manson	Chelan Valley Media Group LLC	Classic country
KZAX-LP	94.9 FM	Bellingham	Make Shift	Variety
KZAZ	91.7 FM	Bellingham	Washington State University	Public radio, Classical
KZBD	105.7 FM	Spokane	SMG-Spokane, LLC	Top 40 (CHR)
KZBE	104.3 FM	Omak	North Cascades Broadcasting, Inc.	Hot adult contemporary
KZEG	104.9 FM	Sequim	Radio Pacific, Inc.	Classic hits
KZFS	1280 AM	Spokane	iHM Licenses, LLC	Classic hip hop
KZGI	105.7 FM	Sedro-Woolley	Bustos Media Holdings, LLC	Regional Mexican
KZHR	92.5 FM	Dayton	Townsquare License, LLC	Spanish Adult hits
KZIZ	1560 AM	Pacific	Akal Media, Inc.	Urban contemporary gospel
KZJJ	104.5 FM	Mesa	Alcon Media, LLC	Regional Mexican
KZML	95.9 FM	Quincy	Bustos Media Holdings, LLC	Regional Mexican
KZNW	103.3 FM	Oak Harbor	Bustos Media Holdings, LLC	Regional Mexican
KZOK-FM	102.5 FM	Seattle	iHM Licenses, LLC	Classic rock
KZTA	96.9 FM	Naches	Bustos Media Holdings, LLC	Regional Mexican
KZTM	102.9 FM	McKenna	Bustos Media Holdings, LLC	Regional Mexican
KZTR-LP	103.5 FM	Yakima	Corporation of the Catholic Bishop of Yakima	Catholic
KZUS	92.3 FM	Ephrata	Bustos Media Holdings, LLC	Regional Mexican
KZUU	90.7 FM	Pullman	Washington State University	Educational
KZXR	1310 AM	Prosser	Iglesia Pentecostal Vispera del Fin	Silent
KZXR-FM	101.7 FM	Prosser	Bustos Media Holdings, LLC	Regional Mexican
KZZL-FM	99.5 FM	Pullman	Inland Northwest Broadcasting, LLC	Country
KZZU-FM	92.9 FM	Spokane	Queenb Radio, Inc.	Adult Top 40

== Defunct ==
- KAPY-LP
- KARR
- KBAI
- KBNO-FM
- KBVU
- KCFL-LP
- KCKO
- KEYG
- KFC
- KFKB
- KFWY
- KGRU-LP
- KIKN
- KISN
- KKZU
- KLFF
- KMRE-LP
- KNTB
- KOLW
- KOSW-LP
- KOWA-LP
- KREN
- KSVY
- KUTI
- KYAO-LP
- KZLF-LP
