= List of AM radio stations in the United States by call sign (initial letters KT–KZ) =

This is a list of AM radio stations in the United States having call signs beginning with the letters KT to KZ.

== KT-- ==
Callsign	Frequency	City of license
KTAE	1260 AM	Elgin, Texas
KTAM	1240 AM	Bryan, Texas
KTAN	1420 AM	Sierra Vista, Arizona
KTAP	1600 AM	Santa Maria, California
KTAR	620 AM	Phoenix, Arizona
KTAT	1570 AM	Frederick, Oklahoma
KTBA	760 AM	Tuba City, Arizona
KTBB	600 AM	Tyler, Texas
KTBI	810 AM	Ephrata, Washington
KTBL	1050 AM	Los Ranchos de Albuquerque, New Mexico
KTBR	950 AM	Roseburg, Oregon
KTBZ	1430 AM	Tulsa, Oklahoma
KTCK	1310 AM	Dallas, Texas
KTCR	980 AM	Selah, Washington
KTCS	1410 AM	Fort Smith, Arkansas
KTCT	1050 AM	San Mateo, California
KTEK	1110 AM	Alvin, Texas
KTEL	1490 AM	Walla Walla, Washington
KTEM	1400 AM	Temple, Texas
KTFI	1270 AM	Twin Falls, Idaho
KTFS	940 AM	Texarkana, Texas
KTGE	1570 AM	Salinas, California
KTGG	1540 AM	Okemos, Michigan
KTGO	1090 AM	Tioga, North Dakota
KTGR	1580 AM	Columbia, Missouri
KTHH	990 AM	Albany, Oregon
KTHS	1480 AM	Green Forest, Arkansas
KTIB	640 AM	Thibodaux, Louisiana
KTIC	840 AM	West Point, Nebraska
KTIE	590 AM	San Bernardino, California
KTIK	1350 AM	Nampa, Idaho
KTIL	1590 AM	Netarts, Oregon
KTIP	1450 AM	Porterville, California
KTIS	900 AM	Minneapolis, Minnesota
KTIX	1240 AM	Pendleton, Oregon
KTJS	1420 AM	Hobart, Oklahoma
KTKC	1460 AM	Springhill, Louisiana
KTKN	930 AM	Ketchikan, Alaska
KTKR	760 AM	San Antonio, Texas
KTKT	990 AM	Tucson, Arizona
KTKZ	1380 AM	Sacramento, California
KTLK	1130 AM	Minneapolis, Minnesota
KTLO	1240 AM	Mountain Home, Arkansas
KTLQ	1350 AM	Tahlequah, Oklahoma
KTLR	890 AM	Oklahoma City, Oklahoma
KTLV	1220 AM	Midwest City, Oklahoma
KTMC	1400 AM	McAlester, Oklahoma
KTMM	1340 AM	Grand Junction, Colorado
KTMP	1340 AM	Heber City, Utah
KTMR	1130 AM	Converse, Texas
KTMS	990 AM	Santa Barbara, California
KTMT	580 AM	Ashland, Oregon
KTMZ	1220 AM	Pomona, California
KTNC	1230 AM	Falls City, Nebraska
KTNF	950 AM	St. Louis Park, Minnesota
KTNK	1410 AM	Lompoc, California
KTNM	1400 AM	Tucumcari, New Mexico
KTNN	660 AM	Window Rock, Arizona
KTNO	1700 AM	Richardson, Texas
KTNQ	1020 AM	Los Angeles
KTNS	1060 AM	Oakhurst, California
KTNZ	1360 AM	Amarillo, Texas
KTOE	1420 AM	Mankato, Minnesota
KTOK	1000 AM	Oklahoma City, Oklahoma
KTON	1330 AM	Cameron, Texas
KTOP	1490 AM	Topeka, Kansas
KTOQ	1340 AM	Rapid City, South Dakota
KTOX	1340 AM	Needles, California
KTPA	1370 AM	Prescott, Arkansas
KTPI	1340 AM	Mojave, California
KTRB	860 AM	San Francisco, California
KTRC	1260 AM	Santa Fe, New Mexico
KTRF	1230 AM	Thief River Falls, Minnesota
KTRH	740 AM	Houston, Texas
KTRP	1450 AM	Notus, Idaho
KTRS	550 AM	St. Louis, Missouri
KTRW	630 AM	Opportunity, Washington
KTSA	550 AM	San Antonio, Texas
KTSM	690 AM	El Paso, Texas
KTSN	1060 AM	Lockhart, Texas
KTTH	770 AM	Seattle, Washington
KTTN	1600 AM	Trenton, Missouri
KTTO	970 AM	Spokane, Washington
KTTP	1110 AM	Pineville, Louisiana
KTTR	1490 AM	Rolla, Missouri
KTTT	1510 AM	Columbus, Nebraska
KTTU	950 AM	Lubbock, Texas
KTUB	1600 AM	Centerville, Utah
KTUC	1400 AM	Tucson, Arizona
KTUI	1560 AM	Sullivan, Missouri
KTUV	1440 AM	Little Rock, Arkansas
KTUZ	1570 AM	Catoosa, Oklahoma
KTWG	801 AM	Agana, Guam
KTWO	1030 AM	Casper, Wyoming
KTXV	890 AM	Mabank, Texas
KTXW	1120 AM	Manor, Texas
KTXZ	1560 AM	West Lake Hills, Texas
KTYM	1460 AM	Inglewood, California
KTZN	550 AM	Anchorage, Alaska
KTZR	1450 AM	Tucson, Arizona

== KU-- ==
Callsign	Frequency	City of license
KUAI	570 AM	Eleele, Hawaii
KUAU	1570 AM	Haiku, Hawaii
KUAZ	1550 AM	Tucson, Arizona
KUBA	1600 AM	Yuba City, California
KUBC	580 AM	Montrose, Colorado
KUBE	1350 AM	Pueblo, Colorado
KUBR	1210 AM	San Juan, Texas
KUFO	970 AM	Portland, Oregon
KUGN	590 AM	Eugene, Oregon
KUGR	1490 AM	Green River, Wyoming
KUHL	1440 AM	Santa Maria, California
KUIK	1360 AM	Hillsboro, Oregon
KUJ	1420 AM	Walla Walla, Washington
KUKI	1400 AM	Ukiah, California
KULE	730 AM	Ephrata, Washington
KULP	1390 AM	El Campo, Texas
KULY	1420 AM	Ulysses, Kansas
KUMA	1290 AM	Pendleton, Oregon
KUNO	1400 AM	Corpus Christi, Texas
KUNX	1400 AM	Santa Paula, California
KUOA	1290 AM	Siloam Springs, Arkansas
KUOM	770 AM	Minneapolis, Minnesota
KUOW	1340 AM	Tumwater, Washington
KURM	790 AM	Rogers, Arkansas
KURS	1040 AM	San Diego, California
KURV	710 AM	Edinburg, Texas
KURY	910 AM	Brookings, Oregon
KUSG	1350 AM	Agana, Guam
KUSH	1600 AM	Cushing, Oklahoma
KUTI	680 AM	Lacey, Washington
KUTR	820 AM	Taylorsville, Utah
KUTY	1470 AM	Palmdale, California
KUVR	1380 AM	Holdrege, Nebraska
KUYO	830 AM	Evansville, Wyoming
KUZZ	550 AM	Bakersfield, California

== KV-- ==
Callsign	Frequency	City of license
KVAK	1230 AM	Valdez, Alaska
KVAN	1560 AM	Burbank, Washington
KVBR	1340 AM	Brainerd, Minnesota
KVBV	1450 AM	Buena Vista, Colorado
KVCK	1450 AM	Wolf Point, Montana
KVCU	1190 AM	Boulder, Colorado
KVDW	1530 AM	England, Arkansas
KVEC	920 AM	San Luis Obispo, California
KVEL	920 AM	Vernal, Utah
KVEN	1520 AM	Port Hueneme, California
KVET	1300 AM	Austin, Texas
KVFC	740 AM	Cortez, Colorado
KVFD	1400 AM	Fort Dodge, Iowa
KVGB	1590 AM	Great Bend, Kansas
KVGC	1340 AM	Jackson, California
KVHZ	1430 AM	Wasilla, Alaska
KVI	570 AM	Seattle, Washington
KVIN	920 AM	Ceres, California
KVIP	540 AM	Redding, California
KVIS	910 AM	Miami, Oklahoma
KVIV	1340 AM	El Paso, Texas
KVJY	840 AM	Pharr, Texas
KVLF	1240 AM	Alpine, Texas
KVLG	1570 AM	La Grange, Texas
KVLI	1140 AM	Lake Isabella, California
KVLV	980 AM	Fallon, Nevada
KVMA	630 AM	Magnolia, Arkansas
KVMC	1320 AM	Colorado City, Texas
KVMI	1270 AM	Tulare, California
KVML	1450 AM	Sonora, California
KVNA	600 AM	Flagstaff, Arizona
KVNI	1080 AM	Coeur d'Alene, Idaho
KVNN	1340 AM	Victoria, Texas
KVNR	1480 AM	Santa Ana, California
KVNS	1700 AM	Brownsville, Texas
KVNT	1020 AM	Eagle River, Alaska
KVNU	610 AM	Logan, Utah
KVOC	1230 AM	Casper, Wyoming
KVOE	1400 AM	Emporia, Kansas
KVOI	1030 AM	Cortaro (Tucson), Arizona
KVOL	1330 AM	Lafayette, Louisiana
KVOM	800 AM	Morrilton, Arkansas
KVON	1440 AM	Napa, California
KVOP	1090 AM	Plainview, Texas
KVOR	740 AM	Colorado Springs, Colorado
KVOT	1340 AM	Taos, New Mexico
KVOW	1450 AM	Riverton, Wyoming
KVOZ	890 AM	Del Mar Hills, Texas
KVPI	1050 AM	Ville Platte, Louisiana
KVRC	1240 AM	Arkadelphia, Arkansas
KVRI	1600 AM	Blaine, Washington
KVRP	1400 AM	Stamford, Texas
KVSF	1400 AM	Santa Fe, New Mexico
KVSH	940 AM	Valentine, Nebraska
KVSI	1450 AM	Montpelier, Idaho
KVSM	1380 AM	Santa Maria, California
KVSO	1240 AM	Ardmore, Oklahoma
KVSV	1190 AM	Beloit, Kansas
KVTA	1590 AM	Ventura, California
KVTK	1570 AM	Vermillion, South Dakota
KVTO	1400 AM	Berkeley, California
KVTR	1590 AM	Victorville, California
KVTT	1110 AM	Mineral Wells, Texas
KVVN	1430 AM	Santa Clara, California
KVWC	1490 AM	Vernon, Texas
KVWM	970 AM	Show Low, Arizona
KVXR	1280 AM	Moorhead, Minnesota

== KW-- ==
Callsign	Frequency	City of license
KWAC	1490 AM	Bakersfield, California
KWAD	920 AM	Wadena, Minnesota
KWAK	1240 AM	Stuttgart, Arkansas
KWAM	990 AM	Memphis, Tennessee
KWAT	950 AM	Watertown, South Dakota
KWAY	1470 AM	Waverly, Iowa
KWBC	1550 AM	College Station, Texas
KWBE	1450 AM	Beatrice, Nebraska
KWBF	1420 AM	Lubbock, Texas
KWBG	1590 AM	Boone, Iowa
KWBW	1450 AM	Hutchinson, Kansas
KWBY	940 AM	Woodburn, Oregon
KWDF	840 AM	Ball, Louisiana
KWDJ	1360 AM	Ridgecrest, California
KWDP	820 AM	Waldport, Oregon
KWED	1580 AM	Seguin, Texas
KWEL	1070 AM	Midland, Texas
KWES	1450 AM	Ruidoso, New Mexico
KWEY	1590 AM	Weatherford, Oklahoma
KWFS	1290 AM	Wichita Falls, Texas
KWG	1230 AM	Stockton, California
KWHI	1280 AM	Brenham, Texas
KWHN	1320 AM	Ft. Smith, Arkansas
KWHW	1450 AM	Altus, Oklahoma
KWIK	1240 AM	Pocatello, Idaho
KWIL	790 AM	Albany, Oregon
KWIP	880 AM	Dallas, Oregon
KWIQ	1020 AM	Moses Lake North, Washington
KWIX	1230 AM	Moberly, Missouri
KWJB	1510 AM	Canton, Texas
KWKA	680 AM	Clovis, New Mexico
KWKC	1340 AM	Abilene, Texas
KWKH	1130 AM	Shreveport, Louisiana
KWKW	1330 AM	Los Angeles
KWKY	1150 AM	Des Moines, Iowa
KWLC	1240 AM	Decorah, Iowa
KWLE	1340 AM	Anacortes, Washington
KWLM	1340 AM	Willmar, Minnesota
KWLO	1580 AM	Springville, Utah
KWMC	1490 AM	Del Rio, Texas
KWMF	1380 AM	Pleasanton, Texas
KWML	570 AM	Las Cruces, New Mexico
KWMT	540 AM	Fort Dodge, Iowa
KWNC	1370 AM	Quincy, Washington
KWNO	1230 AM	Winona, Minnesota
KWOA	730 AM	Worthington, Minnesota
KWOC	930 AM	Poplar Bluff, Missouri
KWOD	1660 AM	Kansas City, Kansas
KWOK	1490 AM	Aberdeen, Washington
KWON	1400 AM	Bartlesville, Oklahoma
KWOR	1340 AM	Worland, Wyoming
KWOS	950 AM	Jefferson City, Missouri
KWPC	860 AM	Muscatine, Iowa
KWPM	1450 AM	West Plains, Missouri
KWPN	640 AM	Moore, Oklahoma
KWQQ	1320 AM	Hemet, California
KWRD	1470 AM	Henderson, Texas
KWRE	730 AM	Warrenton, Missouri
KWRF	860 AM	Warren, Arkansas
KWRM	1370 AM	Corona, California
KWRN	1550 AM	Apple Valley, California
KWRO	630 AM	Coquille, Oregon
KWRP	690 AM	Pueblo, Colorado
KWRT	1370 AM	Boonville, Missouri
KWRU	1300 AM	Fresno, California
KWSH	1260 AM	Wewoka, Oklahoma
KWSL	1470 AM	Sioux City, Iowa
KWSN	1230 AM	Sioux Falls, South Dakota
KWST	1430 AM	El Centro, California
KWSU	1250 AM	Pullman, Washington
KWSW	980 AM	Eureka, California
KWSX	1280 AM	Stockton, California
KWTL	1370 AM	Grand Forks, North Dakota
KWTO	560 AM	Springfield, Missouri
KWTX	1230 AM	Waco, Texas
KWUF	1400 AM	Pagosa Springs, Colorado
KWUL	920 AM	St. Louis, Missouri
KWVE	1110 AM	Pasadena, California
KWVR	1340 AM	Enterprise, Oregon
KWWJ	1360 AM	Baytown, Texas
KWWN	1100 AM	Las Vegas, Nevada
KWXT	1490 AM	Dardanelle, Arkansas
KWXY	1340 AM	Cathedral City, California
KWYN	1400 AM	Wynne, Arkansas
KWYO	1410 AM	Sheridan, Wyoming
KWYR	1260 AM	Winner, South Dakota
KWYS	920 AM	West Yellowstone, Montana
KWYZ	1230 AM	Everett, Washington

== KX-- ==
Callsign	Frequency	City of license
KXAR	1490 AM	Hope, Arkansas
KXBX	1270 AM	Lakeport, California
KXCA	1050 AM	Lawton, Oklahoma
KXCB	1420 AM	Omaha, Nebraska
KXEG	1280 AM	Phoenix, Arizona
KXEL	1540 AM	Waterloo, Iowa
KXEN	1010 AM	St. Louis, Missouri
KXEO	1340 AM	Mexico, Missouri
KXEQ	1340 AM	Reno, Nevada
KXEW	1600 AM	South Tucson, Arizona
KXEX	1550 AM	Fresno, California
KXFN	1380 AM	St. Louis, Missouri
KXGF	1400 AM	Great Falls, Montana
KXGN	1400 AM	Glendive, Montana
KXIC	800 AM	Iowa City, Iowa
KXIT	1240 AM	Dalhart, Texas
KXJJ	1570 AM	Loveland, Colorado
KXJK	950 AM	Forrest City, Arkansas
KXKS	1190 AM	Albuquerque, New Mexico
KXLE	1240 AM	Ellensburg, Washington
KXLO	1230 AM	Lewistown, Montana
KXLQ	1490 AM	Indianola, Iowa
KXLX	700 AM	Airway Heights, Washington
KXLY	920 AM	Spokane, Washington
KXMR	710 AM	Bismarck, North Dakota
KXNO	1460 AM	Des Moines, Iowa
KXNT	840 AM	North Las Vegas, Nevada
KXO	1230 AM	El Centro, California
KXOI	810 AM	Crane, Texas
KXOR	660 AM	Junction City, Oregon
KXOX	1240 AM	Sweetwater, Texas
KXPA	1540 AM	Bellevue, Washington
KXPD	1040 AM	Tigard, Oregon
KXPN	1460 AM	Kearney, Nebraska
KXPO	1340 AM	Grafton, North Dakota
KXPS	1010 AM	Thousand Palms, California
KXQZ	1340 AM	Wendell, Idaho
KXRA	1490 AM	Alexandria, Minnesota
KXRB	1140 AM	Sioux Falls, South Dakota
KXRE	1490 AM	Manitou Springs, Colorado
KXRO	1320 AM	Aberdeen, Washington
KXSL	1470 AM	Show Low, Arizona
KXSS	1390 AM	Waite Park, Minnesota
KXTD	1530 AM	Wagoner, Oklahoma
KXTG	750 AM	Portland, Oregon
KXTK	1280 AM	Arroyo Grande, California
KXTL	1370 AM	Butte, Montana
KXTN	1350 AM	San Antonio, Texas
KXTO	1550 AM	Reno, Nevada
KXXJ	1330 AM	Juneau, Alaska
KXXT	1010 AM	Tolleson, Arizona
KXXX	790 AM	Colby, Kansas
KXYL	1240 AM	Brownwood, Texas
KXYZ	1320 AM	Houston, Texas

== KY-- ==
Callsign	Frequency	City of license
KYAA	1200 AM	Soquel, California
KYAK	930 AM	Yakima, Washington
KYAL	1550 AM	Sapulpa, Oklahoma
KYBC	1600 AM	Cottonwood, Arizona
KYCA	1490 AM	Prescott, Arizona
KYCN	1340 AM	Wheatland, Wyoming
KYCR	1440 AM	Golden Valley, Minnesota
KYES	1180 AM	Rockville, Minnesota
KYET	1170 AM	Golden Valley, Arizona
KYFI	630 AM	St. Louis, Missouri
KYFR	920 AM	Shenandoah, Iowa
KYIZ	1620 AM	Renton, Washington
KYKN	1430 AM	Keizer, Oregon
KYLS	1450 AM	Fredericktown, Missouri
KYLT	1340 AM	Missoula, Montana
KYMN	1080 AM	Northfield, Minnesota
KYMO	1080 AM	East Prairie, Missouri
KYND	1520 AM	Cypress, Texas
KYNG	1590 AM	Springdale, Arkansas
KYNO	940 AM	Fresno, California
KYNR	1490 AM	Toppenish, Washington
KYNS	1340 AM	San Luis Obispo, California
KYNT	1450 AM	Yankton, South Dakota
KYOK	1140 AM	Conroe, Texas
KYOO	1200 AM	Bolivar, Missouri
KYOS	1480 AM	Merced, California
KYOZ	1330 AM	Spokane, Washington
KYPA	1230 AM	Los Angeles
KYRO	1280 AM	Troy, Missouri
KYSJ	1270 AM	St. Joseph, Missouri
KYSP	1340 AM	Wenatchee, Washington
KYST	920 AM	Texas City, Texas
KYTY	810 AM	Somerset, Texas
KYUK	640 AM	Bethel, Alaska
KYUL	1310 AM	Scott City, Kansas
KYVA	1230 AM	Gallup, New Mexico
KYVL	1440 AM	Medford, Oregon
KYW	1060 AM	Philadelphia
KYWL	1490 AM	Bozeman, Montana
KYWN	890 AM	Meridian, Idaho
KYWW	1530 AM	Harlingen, Texas
KYYA	730 AM	Billings, Montana
KYYS	1250 AM	Kansas City, Kansas
KYYW	1470 AM	Abilene, Texas
KYZS	1490 AM	Tyler, Texas

== KZ-- ==
Callsign	Frequency	City of license
KZAC	560 AM	San Francisco, California
KZDC	1250 AM	San Antonio, Texas
KZDG	1550 AM	San Francisco, California
KZEE	1220 AM	Weatherford, Texas
KZER	1250 AM	Santa Barbara, California
KZEZ	1490 AM	Santa Clara, Utah
KZFS	1280 AM	Spokane, Washington
KZGD	1390 AM	Salem, Oregon
KZHC	1230 AM	Burns, Oregon
KZHN	1250 AM	Paris, Texas
KZIM	960 AM	Cape Girardeau, Missouri
KZIP	1310 AM	Amarillo, Texas
KZIZ	1560 AM	Pacific, Washington
KZLS	1640 AM	Enid, Oklahoma
KZMQ	1140 AM	Greybull, Wyoming
KZMX	580 AM	Hot Springs, South Dakota
KZNB	1490 AM	Petaluma, California
KZNE	1150 AM	College Station, Texas
KZNG	1340 AM	Hot Springs, Arkansas
KZNS	1280 AM	Salt Lake City, Utah
KZNT	1460 AM	Colorado Springs, Colorado
KZNX	1530 AM	Creedmoor, Texas
KZOI	1250 AM	Dakota City, Nebraska
KZOO	1210 AM	Honolulu, Hawaii
KZOT	1180 AM	Bellevue, Nebraska
KZOY	1520 AM	Sioux Falls, South Dakota
KZPA	900 AM	Fort Yukon, Alaska
KZQQ	1560 AM	Abilene, Texas
KZRG	1310 AM	Joplin, Missouri
KZSB	1290 AM	Santa Barbara, California
KZSF	1370 AM	San Jose, California
KZSJ	1120 AM	San Martin, California
KZTQ	1270 AM	Sparks, Nevada
KZTS	1380 AM	North Little Rock, Arkansas
KZUE	1460 AM	El Reno, Oklahoma
KZWC	1570 AM	Webster City, Iowa
KZXR	1310 AM	Prosser, Washington
KZYM	1230 AM	Joplin, Missouri
KZYP	1310 AM	Malvern, Arkansas
KZZB	990 AM	Beaumont, Texas
KZZJ	1450 AM	Rugby, North Dakota
KZZN	1490 AM	Littlefield, Texas
KZZZ	1490 AM	Bullhead City, Arizona

== See also ==
- North American call sign
