= Bustos Media =

American radio broadcast company

Bustos Media L.L.C.
- Company type: Privately held
- Headquarters: Portland, Oregon
- Products: radio broadcasting
- Website: bustosmedia.com

Bustos Media L.L.C. is a media corporation headquartered in Portland, Oregon.

Bustos Media specializes in operating Spanish-language, and other ethnic, radio stations in the United States. Most of its stations broadcast in Spanish; however, two of the company's stations have the Portland, Oregon, market's only full-time Russian language formats (KOOR and KGDD).

== History ==
The company, originally headquartered in Sacramento, California, was founded in July 2003 by Amador Bustos and his brother John Bustos, with investments from Providence Equity Partners, Providence, R.I., Alta Communications, Boston, and Opportunity Capital, Fremont, California. The Sacramento-based Bustos Media, a private broadcasting company specializing in Spanish language radio, has over $100 million in private equity. "Amador Bustos has built two radio empires catering to the tastes of America's Spanish-speaking population." Station is currently owned by ADELANTE MEDIA OF CALIFORNIA LICENSE LLC

In 1992, the Amador brothers, with $3 million in private equity investment from Syndicated Communications (SYNCOM), launched Z-Spanish Radio Network, Inc. Over a period of eight years they acquired 32 radio stations. In 2000, Z-Spanish sold the chain to Entravision Communications at a total valuation of $475 million.

In May 2006, Bustos Media gained approval from the Federal Communications Commission to launch a Spanish-language television station in Milwaukee with programming from Azteca América. As of 2009, Bustos Media had 25 radio stations across the U.S. and several television stations.

In January 2010 Bustos Media revealed that it was in technical default with its lenders. On June 30, 2010, Bustos Media announced that the stations would be transferred to NAP Broadcast Holdings LLC, a company named for and controlled by its senior lenders, pending FCC approval. As part of the agreement, Amador and John Bustos resigned, effective immediately.

In September 2010 NAP Broadcasting closed on the merger and announced that they would proceed under the name "Adelante Media Group".

The Bustoses were able to keep some stations in Oregon, California and Texas. In 2011, Bustos Media repurchased the Adelante stations in Portland. Bustos reacquired several radio stations in Washington from Adelante Media Group for $6 million in 2014; the following year, the company bought back WDDW in Milwaukee from Adelante for $1 million.

== Stations ==
=== Arizona ===
- KDRI 830 AM, Tucson Soft Oldies
  - K269FV 101.7 FM, Oro Valley (simulcast KDRI)
- KZLZ 105.3 FM, Casas Adobes Regional Mexican
  - K223CI 92.5, Reggaeton (Simulcast 105.3 HD-2 KZLZ)
- KTGV 106.3 FM, Tucson Rhythmic Oldies
- KVOI 1030 AM, Cortaro News/Talk

=== California ===
- KHHZ 97.7, Gridley, California (Regional Mexican)
- KZSZ 107.5, Colusa, California (Regional Mexican)

=== Oregon ===
- KCKX 1460 AM, Dayton Regional Mexican (Simulcast 940 KWBY)
- KOOR 1010 AM, Milwaukie Spanish CHR
- KGDD 1520 AM, Oregon City Regional Mexican
  - K228EU 93.5 FM, Portland Regional Mexican (Simulcast 1520 KXET)
- KSND 95.1 FM, Monmouth Regional Mexican
- KWBY 940 AM, Woodburn Regional Mexican
  - K227DU 93.3, Salem Regional Mexican (Simulcast 940 KWBY)
- KQRR 1130 AM, Mt Angel Russian Christian
- KZTB 97.9 FM, Milton-Freewater, Oregon Regional Mexican

=== Washington ===
- KDDS-FM 99.3 FM, Elma Regional Mexican
- KDYM 1230 AM, Sunnyside Spanish Adult Hits
- KMIA 1210 AM, Auburn Regional Mexican
- KMMG 96.7 FM, Benton City Spanish CHR
- KMNA 98.7 FM, Mabton
- KRCW 96.3 FM, Royal City Regional Mexican
- KYXE 104.9 FM, Union Gap Regional Mexican
- KZGI 105.7 FM, Sedro-Woolley Regional Mexican
- KZML 95.9 FM, Quincy Regional Mexican
- KZNW 103.3 FM, Mt. Vernon Regional Mexican
- KZTA 96.9 FM, Naches Regional Mexican
- KZTM 102.9 FM, McKenna Regional Mexican
- KZUS 92.3 FM, Ephrata Regional Mexican
  - K225AR 92.9 FM, Wenatchee (rebroadcasts KZUS)
- KZXR-FM 101.7 FM, Prosser

=== Wisconsin ===
- WDDW 104.7 FM, Sturtevant Regional Mexican

== Former Bustos Media stations ==
=== California ===
- KTTA 94.3 FM, Jackson Regional Mexican sold to Radio Lazer
- KLMG 97.9 FM, Esparto Spanish CHR sold to Radio Lazer
- KBBU 93.9 FM, Modesto Regional Mexican sold to Radio Lazer
- KBAA 103.3 FM, Grass Valley Regional Mexican sold to Radio Lazer
- Azteca América 32 KSTV-LP, Sacramento sold to Radio Lazer

=== Colorado ===
- KKHI 101.9, Denver

=== Idaho ===
- KDBI 101.9 FM, Emmett Regional Mexican
- KDBI 106.3 FM, Homedale Spanish CHR

=== Oregon ===
- KRYN 1230 AM, Gresham Spanish Christian sold to Centro Familiar Cristiano
- KXET 1150 AM, Portland Regional Mexican now Defunct
- KZGD 1390 AM, Salem Regional Mexican sold to Iglesia Pentecostal Vispera del Fin

=== Texas ===
- KTXV 890 AM, Mabank

=== Utah ===
- KDUT 102.3 FM, Randolph
- KTUB 1600 AM, Centreville
- KBMG 106.1 FM, Evanston, Wyoming
- KBTU-LP TV, Salt Lake City

=== Washington ===
- KDYK 1020 AM, Union Gap Spanish Adult Hits sold to Centro Familiar Cristiano
  - K229AD 93.7 FM, Yakima (rebroadcasts KDYK) sold to Centro Familiar Cristiano
- KULE 730 AM, Ephrata Spanish sold to Centro Familiar Cristiano
- KZXR 1310 AM, Prosser, sold to Iglesia Pentecostal Vispera del Fin
  - K237GY 95.3 FM, Prosser (rebroadcasts KZXR) sold to Iglesia Pentecostal Vispera del Fin

=== Wisconsin ===
- MundoFox 38 WTSJ-LD, Milwaukee

== Z-Spanish Radio Network ==
Z-Spanish Radio Network had the following radio stations at the time of its sale to Entravision in August 2000.

=== Arizona ===
- KZLZ
- KVVA
- KZNO

=== California ===
- KZSA-FM
- KZMS-FM
- KZWC-FM
- KZSF-FM
- KHOT
- KZFO-FM
- KZCO
- KZSF
- KSQR
- KQBR
- KTDO-FM
- KLOC
- KZMS-FM

=== Illinois ===
- WZCH-FM
- WRZA-FM
- WYPA-AM

=== Indiana ===
- WNDZ

=== Massachusetts ===
- WBPS

=== Texas ===
- KZDL-FM
- KZDF
- KRVA
- KZMP

== See also ==
- Redwood City, California
- List of radio stations in California
- List of United States radio markets
- List of radio stations in Oregon
- List of radio stations in Washington (state)
- Media in Salt Lake City
