= KMCQ =

KMCQ may refer to:

- KMCQ-LP, a low-power radio station (94.3 FM) licensed to serve Salem, Oregon, United States
- KZNW (FM), a radio station (103.3 FM) licensed to serve Oak Harbor, Washington, United States, which held the call sign KMCQ from 2015 to 2018
- KLSW, a radio station (104.5 FM) licensed to serve Covington, Washington, which held the call sign KMCQ from 1984 to 2015
