= KFLT =

KFLT may refer to:

- KFLT-FM, a radio station (104.1 FM) licensed to serve Tucson, Arizona
- KDRI (AM), a radio station (830 AM) licensed to serve Tucson, Arizona, which held the call sign KFLT from 1986 to 2019
- KVCC (FM), a radio station (88.5 FM) licensed to serve Tucson, Arizona, which held the call sign KFLT-FM from 2005 to 2018
