= Kule =

Kule or KULE may refer to:

== Places ==
- Kule, Botswana, a village
- Kule, Łódź Voivodeship, a village in central Poland
- Kule, Silesian Voivodeship, a village in south Poland
- Kule, Sangameshwar, a village in Maharashtra, India
- Kule, Mulshi, a village in Maharashtra, India

== People ==
=== Given name ===
- Kule Acimovic (born 1948), Serbian footballer
- Kule Mbombo (born 1996), Congolese footballer

=== Surname ===
- Dhori Kule (born 1957), Albanian university rector at the University of Tirana

== Radio stations ==
- KULE (AM), serving Ephrata, Washington, United States
- KZUS, an FM station serving Ephrata, Washington, formerly holding the call sign KULE-FM
- KTRB, an AM station serving San Francisco, California, formerly holding the call sign KULE

== Other uses ==
- Philippine Collegian, or Kulê, a student newspaper at the University of the Philippines Diliman
