= KZXR =

KZXR may refer to:

- KZXR (AM), a radio station (1310 AM) licensed to serve Prosser, Washington, United States
- KZXR-FM, a radio station (101.7 FM) licensed to serve Prosser, Washington
