= KZNW =

KZNW may refer to:

- KZNW (FM), a radio station (103.3 FM) licensed to Oak Harbor, Washington, United States
- KYSP, a radio station (1340 AM) licensed to Wenatchee, Washington, United States, which held the call sign KZNW from 2008 to 2015
