= KAPY =

KAPY may refer to:

- KAPY-LP, a low-power radio station (104.9 FM) licensed to serve Duvall, Washington, United States; see List of radio stations in Washington (state)
- KAPY-LP (defunct), a defunct low-power radio station (95.5 FM) formerly licensed to serve Port Angeles, Washington
