= KDRI =

KDRI may refer to:

- KDRI (AM), a radio station (830 AM) licensed to Tucson, Arizona, United States.
- KANM (FM), a radio station (90.3 FM) licensed to serve Grants, New Mexico, United States, which held the call sign KDRI from 2012 to 2017
- Beauregard Regional Airport (ICAO code KDRI)
