= KBNO =

KBNO may refer to:

- KBNO (AM), a radio station (1280 AM) licensed to serve Denver, Colorado, United States
- KBNO-FM, a defunct radio station (89.3 FM) formerly licensed to serve White Salmon, Washington, United States
- The ICAO code for Burns Municipal Airport in Burns, Oregon, United States
