= KSBC =

KSBC may refer to:

- KSBC (FM), a radio station (88.3 FM) licensed to serve Nile, Washington, United States; see List of radio stations in Washington (state)
- Kent School Boat Club
