= 830 AM =

AM radio frequency

The following radio stations broadcast on AM frequency 830 kHz: 830 AM is a United States clear-channel frequency. WCCO Minneapolis is the dominant Class A station on 830 kHz.

== Argentina ==
- LT8 in Rosario, Santa Fe.
- Radio del Pueblo in Buenos Aires.

== Mexico ==
- XEITE-AM in Mexico City
- XELN in Linares, Nuevo León
- XEPUR-AM in Cherán, Michoacán

== United States ==
Stations in bold are clear-channel stations.

Call sign	City of license	Facility ID	Class	Daytime power (kW)	Nighttime power (kW)	Critical hours power (kW)	Unlimited power (kW)	Transmitter coordinates
KDRI	Tucson, Arizona	20649	B	50	1			32.444167°N 111.090833°W
KGLA	Norco, Louisiana	56559	B	5	0.75			30.05°N 90.378056°W
KHVH	Honolulu, Hawaii	34591	B	11	11			21.323889°N 157.875556°W
KLAA	Orange, California	50516	B	50	20			33.928611°N 117.615833°W
KNCO	Grass Valley, California	47885	B	5	5			39.215°N 121.013333°W
KSDP	Sand Point, Alaska	943	B	1	1			55.350278°N 160.470556°W
KUYO	Evansville, Wyoming	11003	D	25		9.2		42.871389°N 106.203611°W (daytime); 42.870278°N 106.203333°W (critical hours)
WACC	Hialeah, Florida	28874	B	1	1			25.772778°N 80.421111°W
**WCCO**	Minneapolis, Minnesota	9642	A				50	45.177778°N 93.348611°W
WCRN	Worcester, Massachusetts	9201	B	50	50			42.247222°N 71.931111°W
WEEU	Reading, Pennsylvania	70508	B	20	6			40.515°N 76.123333°W
WKTX	Cortland, Ohio	42365	D	1				41.415556°N 80.730278°W
WMMI	Shepherd, Michigan	9915	D	1				43.561667°N 84.75°W
WQZQ	Goodlettsville, Tennessee	72960	D	2				36.272778°N 86.715833°W
WTRU	Kernersville, North Carolina	63478	B	50	10			36.199444°N 80.206944°W
WUMY	Memphis, Tennessee	33672	D	3				35.116944°N 90.016389°W
