= KYAB =

KYAB may refer to:

- KYAB-LP, a low-power radio station (97.5 FM) licensed to serve Abilene, Texas, United States
- KCFL-LP, a low-power radio station (105.1 FM) licensed to serve Aberdeen, Washington, United States, which held the call sign KYAB-LP from 2010 to 2015
