= KMIA (AM) =

- Auburn–Federal Way, Washington; United States
- Broadcast area: Seattle metropolitan area
- Frequency: 1210 kHz
- Branding: Radio Amor

Programming
- Language: Spanish
- Format: Christian

Ownership
- Owner: Amador and Rosalie Bustos; (Bustos Media Holdings, LLC)
- Sister stations: KDDS-FM, KZNW, KZTM

History
- First air date: 1958
- Former call signs: KASY (1958–1989); KBSG (1989–2003); KNWX (2003–2004); KWMG (2004–2007); KTBK (2007–2011)
- Former frequencies: 1220 kHz (1958–1989)

Technical information
- Licensing authority: FCC
- Facility ID: 33683
- Class: B
- Power: 27,500 watts (day); 220 watts (night)
- Transmitter coordinates: 47°17′58″N 122°11′18″W
- Translators: 92.1 K221FJ (Tacoma); 98.5 K253CG (Seattle); 102.1 K271BS (Auburn)

Links
- Public license information: Public file; LMS
- Website: radio-amor.com

KMIA (1210 AM) is a radio station licensed to Auburn–Federal Way, Washington, United States, and serves the Seattle metropolitan area. Owned by Amador and Rosalie Bustos, through licensee Bustos Media Holdings, LLC., it broadcasts a Spanish-language Christian Radio format as "Radio Amor."

KMIA is also heard on three low-power FM translators: K221FJ at 92.1 MHz in Tacoma, Washington, K253CG at 98.5 MHz in Seattle, Washington, and K271BS at 102.1 MHz in Auburn.

== History ==
Edward and June Garre were the founders of this station, which began as KASY in 1958. It originally broadcast on 1220 AM as a 250 watt daytimer. It ran a Middle of the Road music format. The station was sold in October 1989.

Viacom bought the station, with 1210 becoming a simulcast of Oldies station 97.3 KBSG-FM. The AM station became KBSG (AM). Entercom bought KBSG-AM-FM in 1996. The simulcast lasted until around 2002, when KBSG (AM) flipped to a business format as KNWX (the former call sign of 770 KTTH). That lasted until 2003, when KNWX switched to an all-news radio format, using programming from AP Radio News.

In December 2004, after Bustos Media bought the station, 1210 switched to a Regional Mexican format, first as KWMG and later as KTBK. In September 2010, Bustos transferred most of its licenses to Adelante Media Group as part of a settlement with its lenders. The station switched to a Spanish popular hits format on November 7, 2011, calling itself "Latino 1210" and operating under the call letters of KMIA.

Logo as La Zeta 1210

Effective December 10, 2014, Bustos Media reacquired KMIA, along with eight other stations and a translator, from Adelante Media for $6 million. On December 31, 2014, KMIA returned to a Regional Mexican format, branded as "La Zeta 1210".

On November 29, 2016, KMIA was granted a Federal Communications Commission construction permit to move the night transmitter to the day transmitter site and reduce night power to 220 watts.

In March 2020, Bustos Media took KMIA silent, notifying the FCC that the COVID-19 pandemic made it economically unviable to keep the station on the air. Bustos characterized the shutdown as temporary. The station eventually returned to the air.
