= KZLZ =

- Casas Adobes, Arizona; United States
- Broadcast area: Tucson metropolitan area
- Frequency: 105.3 MHz
- Branding: La Poderosa 105.3

Programming
- Language: Spanish
- Format: Regional Mexican
- Subchannels: HD2: Spanish rhythmic contemporary "Urbana 92.5"

Ownership
- Owner: Bustos Media; (Bustos Media Holdings, LLC)
- Sister stations: KDRI, KTGV, KVOI

History
- First air date: August 31, 1991

Technical information
- Licensing authority: FCC
- Facility ID: 36022
- Class: C3
- ERP: 580 watts
- HAAT: 581.0 meters (1,906.2 ft)
- Transmitter coordinates: 32.249°N 111.117°W
- Translator: HD2: 92.5 K223CI (Tucson)

Links
- Public license information: Public file; LMS
- Webcast: Listen Live; Listen Live (HD2)
- Website: lapoderosa1053.com; urbanatucson.com (HD2)

KZLZ (105.3 FM) is a commercial radio station licensed to Casas Adobes, Arizona, United States, and serving the Tucson metropolitan area. Owned by Bustos Media, it airs a Regional Mexican format known as "La Poderosa 105.3". Studios are on South Richey Avenue, and the transmitter is located on West Hidden Canyon Drive in Tucson Estates.

KZLZ broadcasts using HD Radio technology. Its HD2 digital subchannel carries a Reggaeton and Spanish Rhythmic Contemporary format known as "Urbana 92.5." The subchannel feeds 150-watt FM translator K223CI at 92.5 MHz in Tucson.

== History ==
The station signed on the air on August 31, 1991. Its original city of license was Kearny and its call sign was KCDX.

In the early 1990s, KCDX was known as "X 105.3", and was an album rock station. Programming was delivered via satellite. In 1993, KCDX was sold to Entravision, with a change in the call letters to KZLZ. Entravision flipped the format to Spanish language Regional Mexican.

On September 5, 2006, Entravision sold KZLZ to Todd Robinson for $4,750,000. On December 1, 2006, the Federal Communications Commission approved the voluntary transfer of the license to KZLZ, LLC. Effective June 1, 2022, KZLZ, LLC sold the station to Bustos Media for $1.4 million.

== See also ==
- List of radio stations in Arizona
