= KFLT-FM =

- Tucson, Arizona; United States
- Frequency: 104.1 MHz (HD Radio)

Programming
- Format: Christian radio
- Network: Family Life Radio

Ownership
- Owner: Family Life Broadcasting; (Family Life Broadcasting, Inc.)

History
- First air date: May 4, 1994
- Former call signs: KUDO (1992–1994, CP); KKHG (1994–1997); KZPT (1997–2007); KQTH (2007–2018)
- Call sign meaning: Family Life Tucson

Technical information
- Licensing authority: FCC
- Facility ID: 20403
- Class: A
- ERP: 3,000 watts
- HAAT: 100 meters (330 ft)
- Transmitter coordinates: 32.290°N 111.019°W

Links
- Public license information: Public file; LMS
- Webcast: Listen live
- Website: myflr.org

KFLT-FM (104.1 MHz) is a non-commercial radio station licensed to Tucson, Arizona, United States. It is the flagship of Family Life Radio, airing the network's Christian programming full-time.

KFLT-FM's studios are on North Oracle Road. The transmitter site is on the city's northwest side, off North Kain Avenue, near Interstate 10.

== History ==
=== Classic rock (1994–1997) ===
The KZPT logo and branding from January 2006 to April 2007.

On May 4, 1994, the station officially signed on. Its original call sign was KKHG. It aired a classic rock format, calling itself "The Hog."

It was owned by The Journal Broadcast Group, a subsidiary of the Milwaukee Journal publishing company. KKHG had studios on North Country Club Road.

=== Modern adult contemporary (1997–2006) ===
On November 14, 1997, KKHG flipped to Modern AC as KZPT, "The Point."

Throughout most of its time, it ran under the name "104-1 The Point" and played many 1980s titles along with adult contemporary hits of the day. It had to compete with AC powerhouse KMXZ-FM, and was getting good ratings until late 2004. Some of the DJs were Darla Thomas, Angie Handa, Kathy Rivers, Greg Curtis, Sheila K, and Drew Michaels. Darla Thomas was the Operations Manager for all the Tucson radio stations owned by the Journal Broadcast Group until November 2010. Greg Curtis later moved to KMXZ.

=== Hot adult contemporary (2006–2007) ===
In 2006, KZPT changed its branding to "Z104.1", with the playlist shifting to Hot AC, and adopted the slogan "Modern Hit Music." The station also added Ken Carr to the DJ line-up, after he had hosted afternoons on KRQQ.

=== Talk (2007–2018) ===
On April 10, 2007, the station switched to "The Truth," a conservative talk format which it would broadcast for the next 11 years. On April 17, 2007, KZPT changed its call sign to KQTH. In March 2010, The Truth was the top rated talk radio station in Tucson, and the fifth-most-listened-to station overall.

On April 21, 2014, KQTH dropped "The Truth" branding, changing to "104.1 KQTH". The station kept its schedule of mostly syndicated conservative talk hosts.

==== Changes in ownership ====
In July 2014, Journal Broadcasting announced that it had agreed to sell its broadcasting assets to the E. W. Scripps Company, and that both companies would spin off their publishing assets into a new company known as Journal Media Group. The transaction was completed in April 2015.

In January 2018, Scripps announced that it would sell all of its radio stations, which included KQTH. In August 2018, Lotus Communications announced that it would acquire Scripps' Tucson and Boise clusters for $8 million. However, to comply with FCC ownership limits, Lotus stated that it would divest KQTH and KTGV. As the sale would put Lotus over federal ownership limits in a market, KQTH would be sold to Family Life Broadcasting for $800,000. The sale was approved on October 10, and the deal was completed on December 12.

=== Christian (2018–present) ===
At the end of the day on December 11, 2018, KQTH dropped its talk format and switched the following day to Family Life Radio's Christian radio format. The station changed its call sign to KFLT-FM on December 13, 2018.

Family Life's previous station in Tucson, KFLT (now KDRI), was subsequently sold to Tucson Radio, owned by several local business people, including veteran DJ Bobby Rich. It flipped to an oldies format in August 2019.
