= KTGV =

Radio station in Oracle–Tucson, Arizona

- Oracle, Arizona; United States
- Broadcast area: Tucson, Arizona
- Frequency: 106.3 MHz
- Branding: 106.3 The Groove

Programming
- Format: Rhythmic oldies

Ownership
- Owner: Bustos Media; (Bustos Media Holdings, LLC)
- Sister stations: KDRI, KVOI, KZLZ

History
- First air date: 1984 (as KTTZ)
- Former call signs: KTTZ (1984–87); KHYT (1987–88); KAWV (1988–90); KBTR (1990–91); KLQB (1991–98); KIXD (1998–99); KGMG (1999–2011)
- Call sign meaning: The Groove

Technical information
- Licensing authority: FCC
- Facility ID: 57504
- Class: C2
- ERP: 440 watts horizontal only
- HAAT: 1,272.0 meters (4,173.2 ft)
- Transmitter coordinates: 32°17′23″N 111°01′08″W

Links
- Public license information: Public file; LMS
- Webcast: Listen Live
- Website: www.1063thegroove.com

KTGV (106.3 FM, "106.3 The Groove") is a radio station licensed to Oracle, Arizona, and serving the Tucson, Arizona area. Owned by Bustos Media, it currently broadcasts a rhythmic oldies format.

== History ==
KTGV goes back to the mid-1980s, when KTTZ went on the air at 103.1, displacing K276AL which was a translator for KUAT-FM, that moved to 89.5 before the station went on the air. Once on the air it took an eclectic view of rock music, which lasted until August 31, 1987. The next day KHYT moved from 1330 to 103.1 and switched to a classic rock format. That didn't last and in May 1988 they adopted the calls KAWV and the imaging for Los Angeles' KTWV including the slogan 'The Wave'.

Soon that was gone and it went through several other formats and calls. Eventually a frequency swap involving moving the 103.1 frequency to Florence Arizona placed them on the current 106.3 frequency and they got a power increase as well.

As to the 101.7 translator, that was either eliminated or displaced when KCMT first went on the air at 101.9. KGMG got the 104.9 translator sometime around or after that time.

The current format is an outgrowth of the previous format, urban AC, and they took a more classic soul/AC approach following the change of format from rhythmic oldies to 'La Preciosa' at what is now 97.1 KTZR.

On March 17, 2011 translator K285DL 104.9 FM stopped simulcasting KGMG and began simulcasting sports-formatted KFFN 1490 AM Tucson, AZ.

On October 5, 2011, KGMG's PD and airstaff were terminated from their jobs. It is expected that the station will flip to a Rhythmic AC format

On October 16, 2011 KGMG changed their call letters to KTGV. On October 24, 2011 KTGV rebranded as "106.3 The Groove".

In July 2014, Journal announced that it had agreed to sell its broadcasting assets to the E. W. Scripps Company, and that both companies would spin off their publishing assets into a new company known as Journal Media Group. The transaction was completed in April 2015.

In January 2018, Scripps announced that it would sell all of its radio stations. In August 2018, Lotus Communications announced that it would acquire Scripps' Tucson and Boise clusters for $8 million. However, to comply with FCC ownership limits, Lotus stated that it would divest KTGV and KQTH. It was announced in August 2018 that KTGV would be sold to Bustos Media for $1 million. The sale was approved on October 10, and the deal was completed on December 12.
