= KURT =

Radio station in Prineville–Bend, Oregon

- Prineville, Oregon; United States
- Broadcast area: Bend, Oregon
- Frequency: 93.7 MHz
- Branding: Worship 24/7

Programming
- Format: Christian worship

Ownership
- Owner: David Harms and Brent Hample; (H&H Broadcasting, LLC)
- Sister stations: KTDD

History
- First air date: 2018

Technical information
- Licensing authority: FCC
- Facility ID: 198808
- Class: C2
- ERP: 1,000 watts
- HAAT: 689 m (2,260 ft)
- Transmitter coordinates: 44°26′17″N 120°57′12″W

Links
- Public license information: Public file; LMS
- Website: worship247.com

KURT (93.7 FM) is a radio station licensed to serve the community of Prineville, Oregon. The station is owned by David Harms and Brent Hample, through licensee H&H Broadcasting, LLC, and broadcasts H&H's Christian worship format known as "Worship 24/7".

The station was assigned the KURT call letters by the Federal Communications Commission on December 10, 2015.
