= KSND =

- Monmouth, Oregon; United States
- Broadcast area: Salem, Oregon
- Frequency: 95.1 MHz
- Branding: La Pantera 95.1

Programming
- Language: Spanish
- Format: Regional Mexican

Ownership
- Owner: Amador and Rosalie Bustos; (Bustos Media Holdings, LLC)

History
- First air date: March 23, 1995
- Former call signs: KNJM (1991–1994, CP)
- Call sign meaning: K-SouND (former branding)

Technical information
- Licensing authority: FCC
- Facility ID: 19242
- Class: C3
- ERP: 1,000 watts
- HAAT: 477 meters
- Transmitter coordinates: 44°53′19″N 123°36′26″W

Links
- Public license information: Public file; LMS
- Webcast: Listen Live
- Website: Official Website

KSND (95.1 FM) is a radio station broadcasting a regional Mexican format. Licensed to Monmouth, Oregon, United States, the station is currently owned by Bustos Media Holdings, LLC.

== History ==
The station Construction Permit was issued with the call sign KNJM on 1991-11-15. On 1994-02-14, the station call sign was changed to the current KSND and went on the air as "K-SOUND 95.1" on March 23, 1995 at 5:12 pm with an adult contemporary format. The station was licensed to Lincoln City, Oregon with the studios in Newport, Oregon and the transmitting facilities on top of Otter Crest near Otter Rock, Oregon. The station transmitted with 6,000 watts of Effective Radiated Power (ERP). It was owned and operated by Elite Broadcasting, Inc., consisting of equal partners William Emery, Keith Miller, Jr. and Jack Schult. In 2001, it was sold to Ernie Hopseker at an estimated price of 400,000 dollars and subsequently moved to Monmouth, Oregon. Known as "Salem's FM", the format was Adult Hits with personalities on air every day. KSND was sold June 1, 2007 at an estimated price of 1.7 million dollars.

On March 9. 2012, KSND changed their format from Regional Mexican (simulcasting KWBY 940 AM Woodburn, Oregon) to Spanish adult hits, branded as "Recuerdo 95.1".

On May 1, 2013, KSND changed their format from Spanish adult hits to Spanish oldies, branded as "La Clasica 95.1".

On June 4, 2014, KSND changed their format to regional Mexican, branded as "La Gran D 95.1".

In August 2017, KSND rebranded as "La Pantera 95.1".
