= KZTM =

Radio station in Centralia, Washington

- McKenna, Washington; United States
- Broadcast area: Olympia and Tacoma, Washington
- Frequency: 102.9 MHz (HD Radio)
- Branding: La Zeta 102.9

Programming
- Language: Spanish
- Format: Regional Mexican
- Subchannels: HD2: Spanish pop (“Urbana”)

Ownership
- Owner: Bustos Media; (Bustos Media Holdings, LLC)
- Sister stations: KDDS-FM, KMIA, KZNW

History
- First air date: 1966 (as KGME-FM)
- Former call signs: KGME-FM (1966–1968); KELA-FM (1968–1983); KMNT (1983–2005); KNBQ (2005–2013); KYNW (2013–2016); KFOO (2016–2017); KFNY (2017–2019)
- Call sign meaning: "Zeta"

Technical information
- Licensing authority: FCC
- Facility ID: 33829
- Class: C
- ERP: 70,000 watts
- HAAT: 668 meters (2,192 ft)
- Transmitter coordinates: 46°58′31″N 123°08′16″W

Links
- Public license information: Public file; LMS
- Webcast: Listen live
- Website: laradiodeseattle.com

KZTM (102.9 FM) is a Regional Mexican radio station serving the Tacoma and Olympia, Washington area. Owned and operated by Bustos Media, through licensee Bustos Media Holdings, LLC, the station is licensed to McKenna, Washington. The transmitter site is in Capitol State Forest near Olympia, while its studios are located in Kent.

== History ==
=== Early years (1966–2004) ===
This station signed on in 1966 as KGME-FM, with Centralia as its city of license. In 1968, the station changed its callsign to KELA-FM, holding this callsign until 1983 when the calls changed to KMNT. With a country music format serving the Centralia/Chehalis area, the station was branded as "K103" before being known as KMNT Country.

=== Country (2004–2011) ===
In 2004, their tower moved to Capitol Peak near Olympia, the station shifted their focus to the South Sound, adopted a new call sign of KNBQ in 2005 and a new branding: "Q Country 102.9". Its studios were moved to Tacoma as well. A new signal at 104.3 picked up the KMNT call letters and country music format in Centralia/Chehalis.

=== Sports (2011–2013) ===
On November 4, 2011, at 7 a.m., KNBQ started simulcasting sports talk station KJR, becoming "Sports Radio 950 and 102.9 KJR". The station's calls were not changed because its sister station KJR-FM, located on 95.7 FM, already has them. This is a similar move made by KFRC-FM San Francisco, WCFS-FM Chicago, and WSBB-FM Atlanta after those stations began simulcasting KCBS, WBBM and WSB (respectively) due to their sister stations owning the same calls with the -FM suffix having a different format from the AM counterpart and did not want to transfer them over.

=== Adult top 40 (2013–2016) ===
On June 14, 2013, at 10 a.m., KNBQ flipped to Adult Top 40 as "102.9 Now," targeting Olympia and the South Sound region. The first song on "Now" was "Poker Face" by Lady Gaga. The KJR simulcast moved to KJR-FM HD2. On June 19, 2013, the station took the KYNW call sign. It is noted that both this station and Dallas/Fort Worth area sister station KDMX shared the same branding and logo. Although KDMX flipped to Adult Top 40 in 2012, it was unsuccessful as it reverted to its Hot AC format. Most of the station's airstaff consisted of voicetracked and syndicated shows from Johnjay & Rich (from sister KZZP Phoenix), On-Air with Ryan Seacrest, Mario Lopez, and "The Rendevouz" with Simon Marcel and Kim Iversen. Lori Bradley was the station's only local host, hosting middays from 10 a.m. to 2 p.m.

=== Alternative (2016–2017) ===
On January 13, 2016, KYNW announced they will be changing formats on January 19 at Noon, and began redirecting listeners to sister station KBKS-FM. At that time, after playing "Hello" by Adele and the first minute of "Counting Stars" by OneRepublic, KYNW's format moved to KBKS (and was modified to a more broad-based Hot AC); at the same time, KYNW flipped to alternative rock as "ALT 102.9." The first (and ultimately last) song on "ALT" was "Smells Like Teen Spirit" by Nirvana. The move was part of a format shuffle on four of iHeart's Seattle stations, with KBKS's Mainstream Top 40 format moving to 93.3 FM, displacing KUBE's longtime Rhythmic Top 40 format, which would move to KKBW. KKBW's active rock format would be modified to alternative and move to KYNW. On February 5, 2016, KYNW changed its call letters to KFOO, referencing the Seattle-based band Foo Fighters.

=== Smooth jazz (2017–2019) ===
On November 1, 2017, iHeart announced that they would acquire KFNQ, KJAQ, and KZOK from Entercom as part of its merger with CBS Radio, and divest KFOO and KUBE to the Ocean Station Trust in preparation for their sale to a third-party (which was completed on December 19). As part of the impending divestment, the station swapped callsigns with KFNY in Riverside, California on November 14, 2017. On December 11, 2017, KFNY switched to an unbranded smooth jazz format with the slogan "The South Sound’s Smooth Jazz Station" as interim programming, while the previous alternative format and "ALT" branding were moved to an HD Radio subchannel of KJAQ as Alt 96.5 HD2.

=== Spanish (2019–present) ===
On May 6, 2019, Bustos Media acquired KFNY from iHeartMedia's divestiture trust for $3 million. On June 28, 2019, KFNY flipped to regional Mexican. The purchase by Bustos Media was consummated on July 1, 2019, with the new owners changing the station's call sign to KZTM.

In 2021, Bustos filed an application to relocate KZTM's transmitter to a site northwest of Shelton, in order to improve the station's coverage into Seattle and the Olympic Peninsula. The station would operate with an effective radiated power of 90,000 watts. In addition, KZTM changed their city of license from Centralia to McKenna.

== HD radio ==
As of August 2019, KZTM is carried on HD Radio.

- 102.9 HD1 simulcasts the analog format from the standard 102.9 FM frequency.
- 102.9 HD2 airs a Spanish rhythmic contemporary format branded as "Urbana".
