= KVOI =

- Cortaro, Arizona; United States
- Broadcast area: Tucson area
- Frequency: 1030 kHz
- Branding: The Voice

Programming
- Format: Talk radio
- Affiliations: Compass Media Networks; Genesis Communications Network; Salem Radio Network; USA Radio Network; Westwood One

Ownership
- Owner: Bustos Media; (Bustos Media Holdings, LLC)
- Sister stations: KDRI; KTGV; KZLZ

History
- First air date: May 1994
- Former call signs: KEVT (1990–2007); KCEE (2007–2009)
- Call sign meaning: "Voice of Inspiration", from when 690 AM adopted the call letters in 1981

Technical information
- Licensing authority: FCC
- Facility ID: 13969
- Class: B
- Power: 10,000 watts (day); 1,000 watts (night)
- Transmitter coordinates: 32°20′51″N 111°4′19″W

Links
- Public license information: Public file; LMS
- Webcast: Listen live
- Website: www.kvoi.com

KVOI (1030 AM) is a commercial radio station licensed to Cortaro, Arizona, United States, and serving the Tucson metropolitan area. It is owned by Bustos Media and it airs a talk radio format. The studios are on South Richey Avenue in Tucson.

The transmitter is on North Massingale Valley Road in Marana, near Interstate 10.

== History ==
The station was assigned the call sign KEVT on March 7, 1990; it went on the air with Spanish-language programming in May 1994. On January 11, 2007, the station changed its call letters to KCEE. On July 1, 2009, the station swapped formats and call signs with 690 AM in Tucson. AM 1030 became KVOI. Meanwhile, AM 690 became KCEE.

In July 2018, Good News Communications agreed to sell KVOI to Bustos Media. The sale was consummated on October 31, 2018.

== Programming ==
Local programs on KVOI include Wake Up Tucson! and Jump In Tucson in the morning, along with a local show hosted by Bill Buckmaster. The rest of the schedule consists of nationally syndicated conservative talk shows.
