= KXAA =

- Cle Elum, Washington; United States
- Broadcast area: Ellensburg, Washington
- Frequency: 100.3 MHz

Programming
- Format: Religious

Ownership
- Owner: Divine Mercy Broadcasting
- Sister stations: KDMB

History
- First air date: 2002 (at 93.7)
- Former frequencies: 93.7 MHz (2002–2013)

Technical information
- Licensing authority: FCC
- Facility ID: 87569
- Class: A
- ERP: 6,000 watts
- HAAT: 29 meters (95 ft)
- Transmitter coordinates: 47°9′6.00″N 120°47′23.00″W

Links
- Public license information: Public file; LMS

KXAA (100.3 FM) is a radio station in Cle Elum, Washington, licensed to Divine Mercy Broadcasting.
