= KDMB =

- Moses Lake, Washington; United States
- Frequency: 88.7 MHz

Programming
- Format: Religious

Ownership
- Owner: Divine Mercy Broadcasting
- Sister stations: KXAA

History
- First air date: 2010

Technical information
- Licensing authority: FCC
- Facility ID: 87569
- Class: C2
- ERP: 4,600 watts
- HAAT: 29 meters (95 ft)
- Transmitter coordinates: 47°19′7.80″N 119°42′18.30″W

Links
- Public license information: Public file; LMS

KDMB (88.7 FM) is a radio station licensed to Moses Lake, Washington, United States. The station is currently owned by Divine Mercy Broadcasting.
