= KTUB =

Radio station in Centerville, Utah

- Centerville, Utah; United States
- Broadcast area: Salt Lake City
- Frequency: 1600 kHz
- Branding: Sportstalk Juan 1600 AM

Programming
- Format: Christian Radio

Ownership
- Owner: Bible Clarity

History
- First air date: December 1, 1957 (as KBBC)
- Former call signs: KBBC (1957–1972); KLAT (1972–1976); KLRK (1976–1977); KBBX (1977–1993); KCPX (1993–1999); KSGO (1999–2004); KRRD (2004–2005); KXTA (2005–2007)

Technical information
- Licensing authority: FCC
- Facility ID: 69557
- Class: B
- Power: 5,000 watts day; 1,000 watts night
- Transmitter coordinates: 40°54′7.8″N 111°55′42.8″W

Links
- Public license information: Public file; LMS

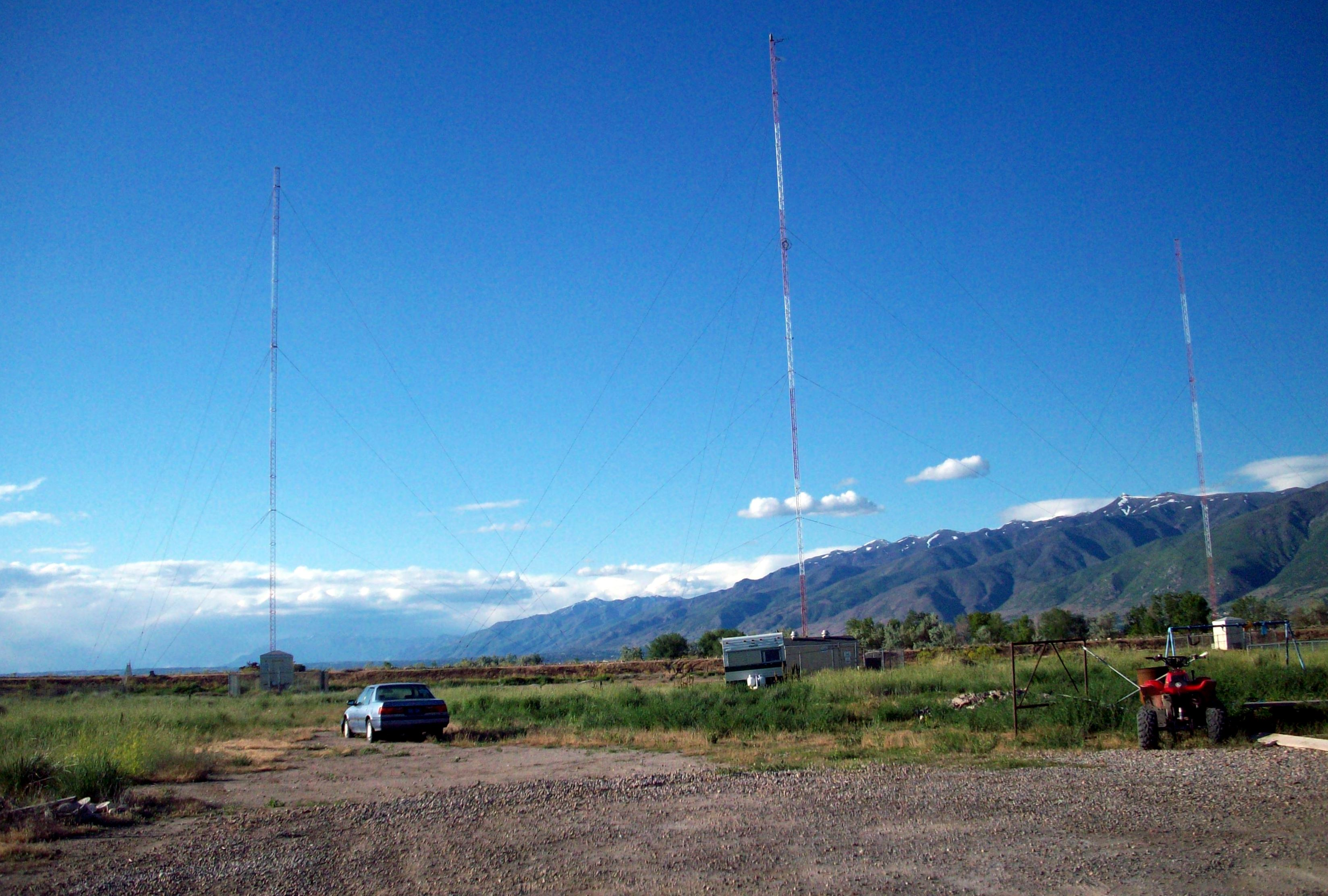
The towers for KTUB, west of Centerville, Utah.

KTUB (1600 AM) is a Christian Radio radio station. Licensed to Centerville, Utah, United States, it serves the Salt Lake City area. The station is owned by Bible Clarity.

== History ==
KBBC were the original call letters for this station. The station went on the air December 1, 1957. The original owner was Howard Pingree. The station operated with 1,000 watts daytime only. In the early mid-1970s, KBBC's transmitter site was displaced by the construction of the I-15 freeway, and the transmitter and studios were relocated to the present location. After the relocation, the station came back on the air with the call letters KLAT (talk spelled backwards) with a talk radio format. The talk format featured several personalities who had been on KSXX, such as Joe Redburn, Tom Carlin, Jim Kirkwood, and others. After the financial failure of that operation, the station was brokered for a short time to Southern Nevada Communications Corporation, who are now known as Faith Communications Corporation, which organization afterward purchased KANN in Ogden, Utah, and still operate that station.

As several of the owners of the station at that time were officers of a Savings and Loan, and had improperly made loans to the radio station, the Utah State Department of Financial Institutions seized the S&L and the station, shut it off, and in July 1977 auctioned the license and facilities to the highest bidder, which was Harold S. Schwartz and Associates. The Schwartz organization operated the station as a commercial Christian radio station, even though Schwartz and other principals in the organization were Jewish. The call letters were changed to KBBX as the original KBBC call was no longer available, and it was desired to get some name recognition from the original call. Schwartz increased the daytime power to 5,000 watts and built a sister FM station on 105.5 MHz which was later moved to 105.7 MHz. The FM station's original call letters were KSTU, but had been changed to KCGL by the time that the FM station went on the air December 24, 1979. (After the call letters KSTU were released, they were taken by a new TV station that is now the Fox affiliate in Salt Lake City.) Schwartz sold the station to Mid-America Gospel Network, the principals of which included several persons who had been key employees of Schwartz. Mid-America Gospel Network later sold the stations, and the AM and FM stations are no longer under common ownership; the former KCGL is now KNRS-FM 105.9, owned by iHeartMedia.

The station changed call letters to KCPX on August 13, 1993 (the KCPX call sign had been released by 1320 AM in Salt Lake City). On March 12, 1999, the station changed its call sign to KSGO, on September 20, 2004, to KRRD, and on September 13, 2005, to KXTA. On November 2, 2007, the station became the current KTUB.

Former logo

Bustos Media used to own the station. In September 2010, Bustos transferred most of its licenses to Adelante Media Group as part of a settlement with its lenders. Alpha Media bought Adelante's Salt Lake City stations for $3.15 million on July 16, 2015. On October 17, 2022, KTUB went silent. A request for special temporary authority to remain silent was filed with the FCC on October 28, 2022, due to loss of KTUB's tower site lease and dismantlement of the station's radio towers. Alpha Media merged with Connoisseur Media on September 4, 2025.

If the construction permit is complete and the station returns to air, it will have moved its transmitter to Murray, Utah, triplexing with KNIT, and KJJC. The station will drop down to 2,800 watts during the day, and 88 watts at night. This will significantly change its coverage area from its old site.

In January 13, 2026. Connoisseur sold KTUB to Bible Clarity for $115,000.
