= Bobby Rich =

American radio executive

Bobby R. Rich is a radio broadcaster, programmer and manager best known for his role as Program Director and Morning Show Host on KFMB-FM San Diego "B-100" (1975–79 and 1984–89) and KMXZ-FM Tucson, Arizona "MIX fm" (1993–2017).

He began his radio career at age 14 in Ephrata, Washington as a DJ. While attending Eastern Washington University in Cheney, Washington he worked as a radio DJ in Spokane, Washington. His first Program Director position was at KSTT Davenport, Iowa. In the 70s, he was also morning host at WMYQ Miami "The Q"; Asst. program director/afternoon DJ at WAVZ New Haven, Connecticut "The New Waves"; DJ at KHJ Los Angeles "93 KHJ".

In the 80s, he was Program Director of WXLO New York City "99X"; KHTZ Los Angeles "K-HITS 97"; and WWSH Philadelphia "FM 106". He was a DJ on KFI Los Angeles and Director of Programming Consultation at Drake-Chenault in Canoga Park, California. In 1985 he returned to KFMB-FM where he developed the "Hot AC" format by melding top hits from the Adult Contemporary and the CHR/Top 40 music charts. He created a San Diego version of a "Zoo" show as "The Rich Brothers B Morning Zoo."

In the 90s, Rich was VP/General Manager and morning show host for KMGI/KIXI Seattle "I-107.7" before moving to Tucson in 1992. In 2011, he created BobbysB-100.com, an Internet Radio Station saluting the legendary B-100 in San Diego.

On February 1, 2017, Rich was released by KMXZ after he made unknown comments during his program that station management saw as offensive but didn't specify, for which Rich apologized on his Facebook page.

Bobby is also heard mornings on 105.3 KHJJ-LP in Albany, Oregon.

In January, 2021, Rich, along with Fletcher McCusker and Jim Arnold launched KDRI (101.7 FM and 830 AM) with a wide music selection, focused on listeners from 45 to 64.

== Awards ==
Rich, inducted into Arizona Broadcasters Hall of Fame 2013, is a multiple winner of Billboard Magazine's, The Gavin Report's and Radio&Records' "Program Director of the Year" and "Personality of the Year" on seven occasions. Radio & Records Industry Achievement Awards twice nominated KMXZ as Station of the Year and named him Adult Contemporary Program Director of the Year in 2007.

Tucson Lifestyle and Tucson Weekly honored him and his station as "Best of Tucson," "Best Morning Show," and "2014 Best Radio Personality." Bobby was awarded the "Golden Mic" for community service by Tucson's Advertising Federation. Greater Tucson Leadership presented him their Community Leadership Award.

On November 8, 2013 Tucson Mayor, Jonathan Rothschild proclaimed "Bobby Rich Day"
