= KRVA (AM) =

Radio station in Cockrell Hill, Texas

Coordinates: 38.611817°N 121.432706°W

Cockrell Hill, Texas; United States
- Broadcast area: Dallas/Fort Worth Metroplex
- Frequency: 1600 kHz
- Branding: VVA 1600AM

Programming
- Language: Vietnamese
- Format: Full service, pop music and talk

Ownership
- Owner: Lrad Media, LLC

History
- First air date: September 29, 1947
- Former call signs: KMAE (1947–1965); KYAL (1965–1976); KXVI (1976–1985); KTNS (1985–1987); KSSA (1987–1993)
- Call sign meaning: K Radio Vietnamese America

Technical information
- Licensing authority: FCC
- Class: B
- Power: 25,000 watts day; 930 watts night

Links
- Public license information: Public file; LMS
- Webcast: Listen live
- Website: vva1600.com

KRVA (1600 kHz), branded as "VVA 1600AM", is a commercial AM radio station, licensed to Cockrell Hill, Texas, and serving the Dallas-Fort Worth Metroplex. It is owned by Lrad Media, LLC, and broadcasts a full service Vietnamese radio format, featuring pop music and talk

By day it is powered at 25,000 watts. At night, to avoid interfering with other stations on 1600 AM, it reduces power to 930 watts. It uses a directional antenna at all times. The transmitter is on Woodvista Court in the Piedmont neighborhood of Southeast Dallas.

== History ==
This station started their broadcasting activities on September 29, 1947, as KMAE on an Entertainment format operating during the daytime hours only in McKinney, Texas. Then in 1965, the station changed to KYAL (call letters stood for "y'all"), playing country music. Over a decade later, the station has moved to Plano, Texas, as the branding and formats changed once again to KXVI (callsign stood for "16" in Roman numbers) under various religious formats. Recently, the KXVI calls were re-used at 100.5 FM in Pittsburg for "The Bridge Network," a DFW-based religious broadcaster serving East Texas. In 1985, the station changed to an all-news station as KTNS. It went off the air after January 7, 1987.

About seven months later, the station was revived by Spanish Radio Pioneer Marcos Rodriguez Sr., father of Marcos A. Rodriguez as KSSA (recently resurrected from 1270 AM) on a Spanish format, relocated to Cockrell Hill (which has a high Hispanic population) and a sister station to Kansas City-based KSSA-FM. In 1993, Z-Spanish Media and Entravision bought KSSA and changed the callsign to KRVA while maintaining its Spanish format. In the 1990s, it simulcast WFAA-TV's 6 p.m. newscast in Spanish.

There was also a period, including summer and autumn of 2005, during which 1600 AM broadcast an Asian format (including Punjabi, Hindi, Urdu and English languages), with music, talk, games and advertising relating to the Asian community in the D/FW area.

In November 2006, Entravision sold KRVA to Mortenson Broadcasting after selling the other stations to Liberman Broadcasting.

It was announced on October 21, 2011, that Mortenson Broadcasting would be selling three of its sister stations and (2 AM and 1 FM translator) to Salem Communications. Mortenson would also spin off this station to Pacificstar Media II Corporation for $1.4 Million in cash. Sometime in October 2012, KRVA switched to its current Vietnamese format (previously on KTXV), abandoning the previous Spanish religious programming.

Pacificstar Media sold the station to Lrad Media, LLC for $1.9 million; the transaction was consummated on March 17, 2014.

Former logo

=== 1981 possession incident ===
During the morning hours on October 29, 1981, KXVI went off the air for 45 minutes after a paddle-welding man from Dallas began commandeering the building and said that he was taken possession for Satan. After replying to the man that this is a gospel station, the man told the manager to "get out of here because this is Satan's station." He started to beat up the manager, was later caught by Plano Police, and was taken to Collin County's Memorial Hospital after being beaten up by the manager.
