= KTDD (FM) =

Radio station in Eatonville, Washington

- Eatonville, Washington; United States
- Broadcast area: South Puget Sound including Tacoma
- Frequency: 104.9 MHz
- Branding: Worship 24/7

Programming
- Format: Contemporary worship music

Ownership
- Owner: 247 Media Broadcasting; (W247 Broadcasting LLC)

History
- First air date: 1995
- Former call signs: KAEK (1993); KJUN-FM (1993–1996); KKBY (1996); KKBY-FM (1996–1999); KFNK (1999–2010); KSGX (2010–2011); KKBW (2011–2016); KUBE (2016–2017)

Technical information
- Licensing authority: FCC
- Facility ID: 3915
- Class: C3
- ERP: 17,000 watts
- HAAT: 124 meters (407 ft)
- Transmitter coordinates: 46°50′24″N 122°15′27″W

Links
- Public license information: Public file; LMS
- Website: worship247.com

KTDD (104.9 MHz) is an FM radio station licensed to Eatonville, Washington, and serving the southern Puget Sound region including Tacoma. KTDD is owned by 247 Media and carries a contemporary worship radio format. The station holds periodic fundraisers to support the on-air ministry.

KTDD has an effective radiated power (ERP) of 17,000 watts. The transmitter is off Alder Cutoff Road East in Eatonville.

== History ==
=== Previous use of 104.9 ===
The 104.9 frequency first signed on in the late 1980s as FM translator K285AE that rebroadcast the adult contemporary format of KLTX. The translator went dark in the early 1990s, when KLTX increased its power.

=== Country (1995–1998) ===
The frequency came back to air in July 1995, using call sign KJUN-FM, broadcasting a country music format. The call letters were changed to KKBY-FM in 1996, and shifted to classic country.

=== Urban (1998–1999) ===
On February 2, 1998, KKBY flipped to urban contemporary as "Y 104.9". This format only lasted for a short time.

=== Rock (1999–2010) ===
On July 26, 1999, KKBY began stunting with all-Beastie Boys music. On July 31, the station flipped to a grunge rock/metal rock-emphasizing active rock format, branded as "Funky Monkey 104.9" (or "The Monkey 104.9"). The call letters were changed to KFNK that October 21. The station gained a noticeable presence in the South Puget Sound area as an alternative to commercially owned stations KISW and KNDD, which were both owned by Entercom. Even after Ackerley Communications bought the station from Rock on Radio, Inc. in 2001, ahead of its own merger with Clear Channel Communications in 2002, the station still emphasized on listener participation and playing music that may not be heard elsewhere, as well as giving air time to local acts. The station also had a nationwide and worldwide presence, as the station streamed online throughout its history.

KFNK briefly aired syndicated programming in 2001, such as the Lex and Terry morning show, which is based out of Dallas. (The station dropped the show by 2002.) The station would begin airing syndicated programming again in 2010, when the station began carrying Nikki Sixx's "Sixxth Sense" show. The station was somewhat anomalous in that it rarely had disc jockeys hosting segments of airtime, and relied heavily on broadcast automation, which the station capitalized on (as some of their liners included "without the dumb-a** DJs and useless bullsh*t"). There was one full-time disc jockey, and 3 part-time air personalities did one show a week each. Most songs ended with a voice-over identifying the song title and artist, also called a "backsell".

=== 1990s hits (2010–2011) ===
On November 10, 2010, at noon, KFNK dropped its 11-year-old active rock format and flipped to a 1990s-leaning adult hits format as "GenX 104-9". The final three songs on The Monkey were "Brass Monkey" by the Beastie Boys, "It's the End of the World as We Know It (And I Feel Fine)" by R.E.M., and "Closing Time" by Semisonic, while GenX's first three songs were "Get Ready for This" by 2 Unlimited, "Smells Like Teen Spirit" by Nirvana, and "Baby Got Back" by Sir Mix-a-Lot. The call letters were changed to KSGX on November 28. Throughout its life as "GenX", ratings for the station were negative, usually peaking at a 0.3 share, as compared to The Monkey's, which usually hung around the 1 share.

On October 28, 2011, at 5 p.m., the station dropped the "GenX" format and began stunting with Halloween music as "Freddy 104-9". The last three songs on "GenX" were "My Favorite Mistake" by Sheryl Crow, "Anniversary" by Tony! Toni! Toné! and "Hella Good" by No Doubt, while the first song on "Freddy" was "Shout at the Devil" by Mötley Crüe.

=== Rock (2011–2016) ===
At 12:01 a.m. on November 1, 2011, after playing "More Human than Human" by White Zombie, the station reverted to active rock as "The Brew 104-9". The first song on "The Brew" was "Epic" by Faith No More. On December 6, 2011, KSGX changed call letters to KKBW to match "The Brew" moniker.

The station's second go-around with the format did not have the grunge/metal-lean like its predecessor. KKBW's playlist consisted of current and well-known hard rock tracks, and some classic hard rock from artists like AC/DC, and Guns N' Roses, which The Monkey rarely played. Some of the station's airstaff was voice-tracked from other Clear Channel stations across the country (similar to iHeartRadio's Rock Nation format that formerly aired on 104.9 HD2), unlike The Monkey.

=== Rhythmic (2016–2017) ===
As part of a major format shuffle involving four of iHeartMedia's (Note: Clear Channel became iHeartMedia on September 16, 2014.) Seattle stations, on January 19, 2016, at noon, after playing "Lump" by Seattle band The Presidents of the United States of America, KKBW's format moved to sister KYNW and was modified to alternative as "Alt 102.9". At the same time, KUBE's long-time rhythmic CHR format and branding moved to KKBW as "KUBE 104.9", with the format targeting the Tacoma and South Sound areas, as its former 93.3 FM frequency adopted KBKS's Mainstream Top 40 format and relaunched as KPWK, "Power 93.3". (KBKS, in turn, adopted KYNW's adult Top 40 format.) KUBE's first song on 104.9 was "Can I Get A..." by Jay-Z. With the change, afternoon host/program director Eric Powers (who had been with KUBE since 1992, becoming program director in 1998) was let go, with Tiffany Warner moving from middays to afternoons. The KUBE call letters were moved to 104.9 on January 26.

=== Religious (2017–present) ===
On November 1, 2017, iHeart announced that it would acquire KFNQ, KJAQ, and KZOK-FM from Entercom as part of Entercom's merger with CBS Radio. The company planned to divest KUBE and KFOO to Ocean Station Trust in preparation for their sale to a third-party (which was completed on December 19). As part of the impending divestment, the station swapped call signs with KTDD in San Bernardino, California, on November 14, 2017. On December 11, 2017, at noon, after playing "Rap God" by Eminem, KTDD flipped to an unbranded simulcast of sister station KZFS in Spokane, carrying a contemporary Christian music format using the slogan "Positive Hit Music". KUBE's programming and format was moved back to KPWK on an HD Radio subchannel (which, albeit partially, reversed the 2016 swap). The KUBE callsign and format was restored to the 93.3 frequency in full in May 2018.

On August 31, 2020, it was announced that 247 Media Ministries would be acquiring the station from the Trust. Upon closure of the sale, the station joined the "Worship 24/7" contemporary worship music network, becoming the second station in that network, joining with KURT in Bend, Oregon (owned by the same founders under the name H&H Broadcasting). The purchase was consummated on November 3, 2020, at a price of $320,000.
