= KJEB =

Classic hits radio station in Seattle

Coordinates: 47°32′39.4″N 122°6′30.4″W

- Seattle, Washington; United States
- Broadcast area: Seattle metropolitan area
- Frequency: 95.7 MHz (HD Radio)
- Branding: 95.7 The Jet

Programming
- Format: Classic hits
- Subchannels: HD1: KJEB analog; HD2: Sports (KJR (AM) simulcast)
- Affiliations: Premiere Networks

Ownership
- Owner: iHeartMedia, Inc.; (iHM Licenses, LLC)
- Sister stations: KBKS-FM, KHHO, KJAQ, KJR, KJR-FM, KPTR, KZOK-FM

History
- First air date: May 25, 1960 (as KGMJ)
- Former call signs: KGMJ (1960–1978); KIXI-FM (1978–1986); KLTX (1986–1994); KJR-FM (1994–2000); KMBX (2000–2001); KBTB (2001–2002); KJR-FM (2002–2022)
- Call sign meaning: "Jet Base"

Technical information
- Licensing authority: FCC
- Facility ID: 48385
- Class: C
- ERP: 100,000 watts
- HAAT: 387 meters (1,270 ft)

Links
- Public license information: Public file; LMS
- Webcast: Listen live (via iHeartRadio)
- Website: 957thejet.iheart.com

KJEB (95.7 FM) is a commercial radio station in Seattle, Washington. It broadcasts a classic hits radio format and is owned by iHeartMedia, Inc. The radio studios and offices are in Seattle's Belltown neighborhood northwest of downtown.

KJEB has an effective radiated power (ERP) of 100,000 watts. The transmitter is on 173rd Avenue SE in Issaquah, Washington, on Cougar Mountain. KJEB broadcasts using HD Radio technology. The HD-2 digital subchannel simulcasts the sports radio format on KJR; the HD-3 subchannel formerly carried the iHeartRadio soft adult contemporary service known as "The Breeze." The HD3 subchannel has since been turned off.

== History ==
=== Beautiful music (1960–1980) ===
On May 25, 1960, the station signed on the air. It was owned until 1963 by Rogan Jones, founder of the radio automation firm IGM. It aired a beautiful music format under the call sign KGMJ. In 1967, it was sold to Elroy McCaw, the owner of KIXI (880 AM), who kept the beautiful music format as a simulcast of the AM station. In 1970, Wally Neskog bought the stations, and changed KGMJ's call letters to KIXI-FM on October 19, 1978.

=== Adult Contemporary (1980-1986) ===
In 1980, the simulcast with KIXI ended. The AM side adopted an oldies format, while the FM side programmed an Adult Contemporary format that played Soft Rock, and was known as "KIXI Light".

=== Soft adult contemporary (1986–1994) ===
The station was sold in 1986 to Thunderbay Broadcasting. On April 28, 1986, it changed call letters and monikers to KLTX "95.7 K-Lite", airing a soft adult contemporary format. In December 1987, KLTX was sold to the Ackerley Group (owners of KJR).

The station had a series of translators located in and around Seattle from the late 1980s through early 1990s. These included K292AL Everett (106.3 FM), K285AE Olympia (104.9 FM, now KTDD), K277AB Edmonds (103.3 FM), and K277AA Seattle (also located at 103.3 FM). The station was known for having a wide and diverse playlist, a rarity for an AC station.

=== Classic hits (1994–2000) ===
In January 1994, they switched their format with a mix of music ranging from 1980s' pop, grunge rock, rap, all-'60s music, country, and hot adult contemporary (and branded as "The Northwest's New 95.7", a nod to KUBE's early years in the 1980s), the station's format was changed to all 1970s hits on April 29, 1994, and changed call letters to KJR-FM on June 1.

The following month, KJR AM and FM was sold to a partnership with New Century Management and Ackerley titled "New Century Media" (Ackerley would re-acquire full control of the two stations in February 1998). The station was home to The Lost 45s with Barry Scott during the mid-1990s. The station gradually shifted towards a general classic hits format in 1997. The station was usually ranked in the middle of the ratings, capturing about a 3 share of the market.

=== Rock AC (2000) ===
In early 2000, the station gradually added more 1980s and 1990s music, while still keeping the KJR-FM call letters. The station officially flipped to hot adult contemporary with the branding "Mix 95.7" in May 2000. The call letters changed to KMBX on August 11, 2000. This format was short-lived.

=== Rhythmic oldies (2000–2002) ===
At 7 p.m., on October 28, 2000, KMBX began stunting with a loop of a heartbeat sound effect. At 7 a.m. on October 30, KMBX flipped to a rhythmic oldies format, branded as "95.7 The Beat." The call letters were also changed to KBTB on January 29, 2001. This format did moderately well in the ratings. However, with the nationwide decline with the rhythmic oldies format, the station fell in the ratings as well.

=== Classic hits (2002–present) ===
Clear Channel Communications (now iHeartMedia) bought the station in May 2002, and on May 29, at 6 p.m., after playing "Last Dance" by Donna Summer, the station started stunting as "Quick 96", where the station played 1,200 10-second clips of songs from many genres. On May 31, at 5 p.m., the stunting concluded and during a live broadcast from the Space Needle, the station changed formats back to classic hits as "Superhits 95.7 KJR-FM" and changed call letters back to KJR-FM a month later.

The first song on the revived "KJR-FM" was "You Ain't Seen Nothin' Yet" by Bachman-Turner Overdrive. The station featured hits from the 1970s and the 1980s, with some 1960s titles. It hired one of the legendary DJs from the original KJR AM in the 1970s, Ric Hansen, to be its morning personality. The second incarnation of the format had done quite well in the Arbitron ratings, usually peaking in the top 5.

In 2008, KJR-FM started rebroadcasting classic American Top 40 shows from the 1970s, picking up the rights from KBSG, which had changed formats that year. By that time, the station had dropped the "Superhits" name and branded as just "95.7 KJR-FM".

On November 12, 2010, at 3 p.m., the station started playing all Christmas music and changed monikers to "Christmas 95.7". On December 26, KJR-FM rebranded as "Oldies 95.7", returning to the classic hits format. However, the station dumped 1980s music, but kept 1970s tracks and added more 1960s tracks. It was one of two stations targeting the Puget Sound area with an oldies/classic hits format, the other being KMCQ.

On April 1, 2011, KJR-FM became the new home of Bob Rivers' morning show. Rivers was let go by rival KZOK-FM the previous September.

On November 4, 2011, Clear Channel did not transfer the KJR-FM calls to its sister station 102.9 FM after that station, which was KNBQ (now KZTM), began simulcasting KJR 950.

By December 2011, KJR-FM added 1980s music back into its playlist. It also updated its logo, and rebranded as simply "95.7 KJR."

KJR-FM carried American Top 40 shows from the 1980s, including those KJR-FM had aired in addition to the AT40 1970s rebroadcast that the station had aired since 2008. The rebroadcasts were heard on weekends. KJR-FM had also added Dick Bartley's Classic Countdown show, also on weekends. KJR-FM's playlist, by this point, consisted of hits from 1964 to 1989.

Over the last two months of 2013 and into 2014, KJR-FM altered its format to add more classic rock and grunge artists. The station registered domains pointing towards a flip to classic rock, classic alternative, or modern rock, with a likely rebranding to 95.7 The Jet, to match Seattle's nickname as "Jet City", as it is home to Boeing Aircraft, and to match the old call sign of KJET (now KLFE) at 1590 AM, which was one of the first alternative rock stations in the country from 1982–1988. On July 29, 2014, KJR-FM went jockless (except for the morning show), and began promoting "a new 95.7 taking off" on August 8 at 10 a.m., after Bob Rivers' final morning show (Rivers announced his retirement on July 28).

On August 8, at 10:08 a.m., following Bob Rivers' goodbye show, KJR-FM flipped back to classic hits and rebranded as 95.7 The Jet. The first song on "The Jet" was "Jet Airliner" by The Steve Miller Band. The flip resulted in the dropping of the remaining 1960s music, with an increased emphasis on 1970s and 1980s hits. In addition, the station added some 1990s hits. In early 2017, the station began to decrease the amount of 1970s hits on its playlist, and increased its emphasis on 1980s hits. The station has also added "iHeart80s Weekends" in which the station plays all-'80s hits every weekend.

On April 20, 2022, KJR-FM changed call letters to KJEB; subsequently, the KJR-FM call letters moved to KUBE on the same date. The change came as KUBE adopted a sports talk format and the KJR-FM call letters and branding the month prior (the KJET call letters are used by a station in Union, Washington).
