= KKZU (Washington) =

- Mountlake Terrace, Washington; United States
- Frequency: 1510 kHz

Ownership
- Owner: Radio Northwest Broadcasting Co.

History
- First air date: September 23, 1968
- Last air date: January 1985
- Former call signs: KURB (1968–1975); KAAR (1975–1980); KKNW (1980–1984)

Technical information
- Power: 250 watts (daytime)

KKZU was a daytime-only radio station that broadcast on 1510 AM in Mountlake Terrace, Washington, United States. It broadcast from September 23, 1968, to January 1985, though it was off the air for four years from 1977 to 1981 and again from October 1982 to February 1983. Originally intended as a community station for southern Snohomish County under the KURB and KAAR call signs, it cycled through formats and failed financially. A sale was approved in 1980, but under KKNW and later KKZU call letters, the daytime-only, low-power station continued to be unable to find its footing. The last owner, Radio Northwest Broadcasting Company, took KKZU silent in January 1985; it never returned to the air.

== History ==
Mount-Ed-Lynn, Inc., applied for a construction permit to build a new 250-watt, daytime-only radio station on 1510 kHz in Mountlake Terrace on August 14, 1965. The application was placed in comparative hearing and ultimately awarded on September 5, 1967. Broadcasting began a year later, on September 23, 1968, after Federal Communications Commission approval came sooner than expected and caught the owners off guard. The station focused on southern Snohomish County and offered programming including taped rebroadcasts of local high school football and basketball games and public affairs programming for the area. One weekend in June 1970, to mark the start of summer, the station offered half-hourly "Bikini-Reports" with station staff and Marine and Navy recruiters—described by The Seattle Times radio critic Victor Stredicke as "professional bikini watchers"—reporting on beach congestion.

The station changed formats regularly in its early history. Originally described as airing "a blend of top 40 music over an easy listening background", it had changed to country music by March 1972, when it dropped the format for adult contemporary. That format lasted less than a year; in December, the station converted to a primarily talk lineup that consisted of call-in shows, radio dramas, and sponsored religion programs, alongside other items. By February 1975, KURB was back to airing country music, except for a Saturday lineup of talk programs. The call letters were changed to KAAR on April 1, 1975, but the format remained unchanged.

On March 22, 1977, the FCC granted permission for KAAR to go silent; it had gone off the air the month before for financial reasons. The station remained off the air for more than four years, during which the FCC approved a sale to Radio Northwest Broadcasting Company in July 1980. Under the new call letters KKNW, the station refocused on the young adult market with a soft adult contemporary format. The land on which the transmitter had been erected was sold, requiring construction of a new transmitter facility north of Bothell, which was bogged down by wet weather. KKNW finally began broadcasting on April 13, 1981. However, by late September 1982, it was off the air again while the station was prepared either for refinancing or for sale.

When it returned to the air on February 8, 1983, the format was changed to urban contemporary. The call letters changed to KKZU in June 1984, at which time the station was branding as "Magic 15", "with the emphasis on U" and an adult contemporary format. However, on January 16, 1985, Radio Northwest advised the FCC that it had taken KKZU silent due to financial problems. It was allowed to keep the station off the air until August 1986; after an FCC inspection found the station vacant and still not broadcasting in March 1987, the FCC ordered Radio Northwest to describe plans to put the station back on the air. Despite promising that it would seek a buyer, no application to sell KKZU ever materialized, and after the FCC initiated a hearing on whether to revoke the broadcast license, the company offered no objection.
