= KZML =

- Quincy, Washington; United States
- Broadcast area: Wenatchee, Washington
- Frequency: 95.9 MHz (HD Radio)
- Branding: La Gran D

Programming
- Format: Regional Mexican
- Subchannels: HD2: Regional Mexican La Zeta

Ownership
- Owner: Amador and Rosalie Bustos; (Bustos Media Holdings, LLC)
- Sister stations: KZUS

History
- First air date: 1996-06-07 (as KTRQ)
- Former call signs: KTRQ (1996–1998); KYAK (1998–1998); KGER (1998–2001)

Technical information
- Licensing authority: FCC
- Facility ID: 15137
- Class: C2
- ERP: 11,000 watts
- HAAT: 320 meters
- Transmitter coordinates: 47°19′13.00″N 119°47′59.00″W
- Repeater: 95.9 KZML-FM1 (Wenatchee)

Links
- Public license information: Public file; LMS
- Webcast: Listen Live
- Website: laradiodeaqui.com

KZML (95.9 FM) is a radio station broadcasting a Regional Mexican format. Licensed to Quincy, Washington, United States, the station serves the Wenatchee area. The station is currently owned by Amador and Rosalie Bustos, through licensee Bustos Media Holdings, LLC.

== History ==
The station went on the air as KTRQ on 1996-06-07. On 1998-05-01, the station changed its call sign to KYAK. On 1998-06-12 to KGER. On 2001-10-29 to the current KZML.

Bustos Media used to own the station. In September 2010, Bustos transferred most of its licenses to Adelante Media Group as part of a settlement with its lenders.

Effective December 10, 2014, Bustos Media repurchased KZML and translator K225AR from Adelante Media, along with eight other stations, for $6 million.
