= KZNW (FM) =

- Oak Harbor, Washington; United States
- Broadcast area: Anacortes, Washington; Bellingham, Washington; Everett, Washington; Port Townsend, Washington; San Juan Islands
- Frequency: 103.3 MHz
- Branding: La Zeta 103.3

Programming
- Format: Regional Mexican

Ownership
- Owner: Bustos Media; (Bustos Media Holdings, LLC)
- Sister stations: KDDS-FM, KMIA, KZTM

History
- First air date: May 26, 2016
- Former call signs: KMCQ (2015–2018)
- Call sign meaning: Z and Northwest

Technical information
- Licensing authority: FCC
- Facility ID: 191491
- Class: C3
- ERP: 1,400 watts
- HAAT: 414 meters (1,358 ft)
- Transmitter coordinates: 48°21′55.0″N 122°16′3.0″W

Links
- Public license information: Public file; LMS
- Webcast: Listen Live
- Website: kznw.lazetaradio.com

KZNW is a Regional Mexican formatted broadcast radio station licensed to Oak Harbor, Washington, serving Anacortes, Bellingham, Everett, Port Townsend and the San Juan Islands in Washington. KZNW is owned and operated by Bustos Media.
