= KYNR =

- Toppenish, Washington; United States
- Frequency: 1490 kHz
- Branding: Voice of the Yakama Nation

Programming
- Format: Variety
- Affiliations: National Public Radio, Native Voice One

Ownership
- Owner: Confederated Tribes and Bands of the Yakama Nation

History
- Former call signs: KENE (1954–2002)

Technical information
- Licensing authority: FCC
- Facility ID: 24586
- Class: C
- Power: 1,000 watts unlimited
- Transmitter coordinates: 46°22′33.00″N 120°19′18.00″W

Links
- Public license information: Public file; LMS
- Website: KYNR

KYNR (1490 AM, "Voice of the Yakama Nation") is a radio station broadcasting a variety music format. Licensed to Toppenish, Washington, United States, the station is currently owned by Confederated Tribes and Bands of the Yakama Nation and features programming from National Public Radio and Native Voice One.
