= KTXV =

Coordinates: 32°17′13″N 95°58′39″W

Mabank, Texas; United States
- Broadcast area: Dallas/Fort Worth Metroplex
- Frequency: 890 kHz
- Branding: Radio Punjab

Programming
- Languages: Punjabi and other languages of South Asia
- Format: Full Service

Ownership
- Owner: Sukhdev Dhillon; (Radio Punjab Dallas LLC)

History
- First air date: 2007
- Call sign meaning: TeXas Vietnamese (previous format)

Technical information
- Licensing authority: FCC
- Class: D (Daytime); B (Nighttime)
- Power: 20,000 watts (Daytime); 250 watts (Nighttime)

Links
- Public license information: Public file; LMS
- Website: radiopunjab.com

KTXV (890 AM) is a commercial radio station licensed to Mabank, Texas, and serving the Dallas/Fort Worth Metroplex. It is owned by Sukhdev Dhillon, through licensee Radio Punjab Dallas LLC. KTXV airs a full service radio format of popular music, news and talk, in Punjabi and other languages of South Asia as well as English.

By day, KTXV broadcasts at 20,000 watts. But during the nighttime hours, KTXV drastically reduces its power to 250 watts to protect Class A clear channel station WLS in Chicago. KTXV uses a directional antenna at all times. The transmitter is off U.S. Route 175 in Eustace, Texas.

== History ==
Previous Radio Saigon Dallas ident used until late 2012.

Signal testing for this station began in November 2007 in English and Asian languages. Once testing was complete, the station began broadcasting a Vietnamese format known as "Radio Saigon."

Radio Saigon later moved to KRVA 1600 AM to make way for a Mandarin and English format supplied by Radio China International.
