= KZUS =

- Ephrata, Washington; United States
- Broadcast area: Moses Lake, Washington
- Frequency: 92.3 MHz
- Branding: La Zeta 92.3

Programming
- Format: Regional Mexican

Ownership
- Owner: Amador and Rosalie Bustos; (Bustos Media Holdings, LLC)
- Sister stations: KZML

History
- First air date: 1982
- Former call signs: KTRJ (1983–1984); KGDN (1984–1990); KULE-FM (1990–2013)

Technical information
- Licensing authority: FCC
- Facility ID: 4042
- Class: C2
- ERP: 26,000 watts
- HAAT: 205 meters (673 ft)
- Transmitter coordinates: 47°18′18.00″N 119°35′53.00″W
- Translator: 92.9 K225AR (Wenatchee)
- Repeater: 95.9 KZML-HD2 (Quincy)

Links
- Public license information: Public file; LMS
- Webcast: Listen Live
- Website: laradiodeaqui.com

KZUS (92.3 FM, "La Zeta 92.3") is a radio station broadcasting a Regional Mexican format. Licensed to Ephrata, Washington, United States, the station is currently owned by Amador and Rosalie Bustos through its licensee Bustos Media Holdings, LLC, and features programming from Dial Global and Fox News Radio.

Bustos Media used to own the station. In September 2010, Bustos transferred most of its licenses to Adelante Media Group as part of a settlement with its lenders.

Effective December 10, 2014, Bustos Media repurchased KZUS from Adelante Media, along with eight other stations and a translator, for $6 million.

On December 31, 2014 KZUS changed their format from country to regional Mexican, branded as "La Zeta 92.3".
