= KDYK =

- Union Gap, Washington; United States
- Broadcast area: Yakima, Washington
- Frequency: 1020 kHz
- Branding: La Zeta 93.7/1020

Programming
- Format: Regional Mexican

Ownership
- Owner: Centro Familiar Cristiano

History
- First air date: 1983 (as KYXE)
- Former call signs: KYXE (1983–2007)

Technical information
- Licensing authority: FCC
- Facility ID: 64506
- Class: B
- Power: 4,000 watts day 400 watts night
- Transmitter coordinates: 46°34′17″N 120°27′15″W
- Translator: 93.7 K229AD (Yakima)

Links
- Public license information: Public file; LMS
- Webcast: Listen Live
- Website: kdyk.lazetaradio.com

KDYK (1020 AM) is a radio station licensed to Union Gap, Washington, United States, the station serves the Yakima area. The station is currently owned by Centro Familiar Cristiano.

== History ==
The station was assigned the call letters KYXE on 1983-04-04. On 2007-11-02, the station changed its call sign to the current KDYK.

Bustos Media used to own the station. In September 2010, Bustos transferred most of its licenses to Adelante Media Group as part of a settlement with its lenders.

Effective December 10, 2014, Bustos Media repurchased KDYK, along with eight other stations and a translator, from Adelante Media for $6 million.

Effective February 8, 2019, Bustos Media sold KDYK and its translator, along with two sister stations, to Centro Familiar Cristiano for $374,500.
