= KWBY (AM) =

- Woodburn, Oregon; United States
- Broadcast area: Portland metropolitan area
- Frequency: 940 kHz
- Branding: La Pantera 940

Programming
- Format: Regional Mexican

Ownership
- Owner: Bustos Media; (Bustos Media Holdings, LLC)

History
- First air date: July 10, 1964
- Former call signs: KWRC (1964–1988)

Technical information
- Licensing authority: FCC
- Facility ID: 165
- Class: D
- Power: 10,000 watts (day); 200 watts (night)
- Transmitter coordinates: 45°10′33.4″N 122°51′1.3″W
- Translator: (93.3 MHz) K227DU (Salem)

Links
- Public license information: Public file; LMS
- Webcast: Listen live
- Website: laradioportland.com

KWBY (940 AM) is a commercial radio station licensed to Woodburn, Oregon, and serves the Portland metropolitan area. Owned by Bustos Media, through licensee Bustos Media Holdings, LLC, it broadcast a Regional Mexican format known as "La Pantera 940".

Programming is heard around the clock on 250-watt FM translator K227DU at 93.3 MHz in Salem.

== History ==
The station signed on the air on July 10, 1964. Its original call sign was KWRC. It began as a daytimer station, powered from dawn to dusk at 250 watts but required to go off the air at night. It aired a middle of the road (MOR) format of popular music, news and sports.

In 1988, it changed its call letters to KWBY. It later switched to Regional Mexican music with Spanish-language programming for Oregon's growing Hispanic population.
