= KDYM =

- Sunnyside, Washington; United States
- Frequency: 1230 kHz

Programming
- Format: Spanish Christian

Ownership
- Owner: Centro Familiar Cristiano

History
- Former call signs: KZTS, KREW

Technical information
- Licensing authority: FCC
- Facility ID: 4757
- Class: C
- Power: 700 watts
- Transmitter coordinates: 46°19′49″N 120°2′10″W
- Translator: (95.7 MHz) K239CS (Sunnyside)

Links
- Public license information: Public file; LMS
- Website: laestaciondelafamilia.org

KDYM (1230 AM) is a radio station licensed to Sunnyside, Washington, United States. The station is owned by Centro Familiar, Cristiano of Seattle, WA.
