= Cortaro, Arizona =

Unincorporated community in Arizona, United States

- neighborhood
- Location within Arizona Location within the United States
- Coordinates: 32°21′22″N 111°05′18″W
- Country: United States
- State: Arizona
- County: Pima
- Elevation: 2,159 ft (658 m)
- Time zone: UTC-7 (Mountain (MST))
- ZIP code: 85742
- Area code: 520
- GNIS feature ID: 24384

Cortaro is a neighborhood of Marana, Arizona in Pima County, Arizona, United States. Cortaro is located along Interstate 10 13 miles (21 km) northwest of Tucson. Cortaro has a post office with ZIP code 85652.

== Climate ==
Climate type is characterized by extremely variable temperature conditions. The Köppen Climate Classification sub-type for this climate is "Bsh" (Mid-Latitude Steppe and Desert Climate).

Climate data for Cortaro, Arizona
Month	Jan	Feb	Mar	Apr	May	Jun	Jul	Aug	Sep	Oct	Nov	Dec	Year
Mean daily maximum °C (°F)	19 (67)	22 (71)	24 (76)	29 (85)	34 (94)	39 (103)	39 (103)	38 (100)	37 (98)	31 (88)	24 (76)	20 (68)	11 (51)
Mean daily minimum °C (°F)	1 (34)	3 (37)	5 (41)	8 (47)	12 (54)	19 (66)	23 (73)	22 (71)	18 (65)	12 (53)	6 (42)	2 (35)	11 (51)
Average precipitation mm (inches)	18 (0.7)	20 (0.8)	20 (0.8)	10 (0.4)	2.5 (0.1)	7.6 (0.3)	58 (2.3)	53 (2.1)	28 (1.1)	23 (0.9)	18 (0.7)	28 (1.1)	280 (11.2)
Source: Weatherbase
