= KLSW =

K-LOVE radio station in Covington, Washington

- Covington, Washington; United States
- Broadcast area: Seattle metropolitan area
- Frequency: 104.5 MHz

Programming
- Format: Contemporary Christian
- Network: K-Love

Ownership
- Owner: Educational Media Foundation; (K-LOVE, Inc.)
- Sister stations: KWAO

History
- First air date: November 28, 1968, in The Dalles, Oregon
- Former call signs: KCIV-FM (1968–1984); KMCQ (1984–2015)
- Call sign meaning: K-Love Seattle Washington

Technical information
- Licensing authority: FCC
- Facility ID: 41861
- Class: C2
- Power: 7,100 Watts
- HAAT: 388 meters (1,273 ft)
- Transmitter coordinates: 47°32′35.0″N 122°6′25.0″W

Links
- Public license information: Public file; LMS
- Webcast: KLSW Webstream
- Website: KLSW Online

KLSW is a Contemporary Christian formatted broadcast radio station licensed to Covington, Washington, serving the Seattle metropolitan area. KLSW is owned and operated by Educational Media Foundation.

== History ==
KMCQ, who signed on the air on November 28, 1968, as KCIV-FM and changed call letters to KMCQ on June 20, 1984, has been serving The Dalles/Hood River, Oregon area since its sign on, as a beautiful music station under the KCIV-FM calls, then mostly as a Hot AC under the KMCQ calls until March 30, 2007. In 2005, a realignment of FM frequencies in the Pacific Northwest area resulted in several stations moving to new locations.

KMCQ would end up being one of the stations relocating in the shuffle as the 104.5 signal changed its city of license to Covington, Washington, a suburb of Seattle in southwest King County. As a result of this move, KMIH, a class-D FM station licensed to Mercer Island, Washington, vacated the 104.5 signal to make room for KMCQ and moved to 88.9 after the changes were made. Already another station on this same frequency, KCFL-LP, has since relocated to Ocean Shores, Washington at 89.5.

KMCQ was testing its signal and allowed KMIH to remain at their current frequency, but requested that they sign-off their 104.5 transmission occasionally at night in order to do the testing. The testing was done most of time with programing provided by KMIH, possibly to lower the number of listener complaints. At the same time there were several issues holding up the move-in as they also waited on KAFE—Bellingham, Washington's planned move from 104.3 to 104.1 which was delayed by the coordination process with Canada as the stations are all in the Canadian border zone. In addition, CHHR-FM 104.1 Vancouver was approved as a new station in 2008 by the CRTC. In February 2009, CHHR-FM applied to the CRTC to move from 104.1 to 104.3, allowing KAFE to move to 104.1 and allowing KMCQ to move to Cougar Mountain; CHHR-FM itself would begin broadcast on July 1, 2009, on 104.1.

On August 27, 2008, it was announced that KMIH and KMCQ finalized their frequency swap. The move now paved the way for KMCQ to finally target the Puget Sound area. KMCQ also announced that on August 31, 2008, that they will flip from adult contemporary to oldies, filling the void left open by KBSG, who dropped the format for news/talk as KIRO-FM two weeks earlier.

The frequency swap between CHHR-FM and KAFE was granted on March 31, 2009; the two stations swapped frequencies on January 14, 2010, at 7:30 AM, thus allowing KMCQ to increase its effective radiated power and become a full-fledged Seattle radio station with wider coverage, beginning February 8, 2010.

Following the flip of KVI to talk in January 2012, KMCQ became the market's only oldies station, with rival KJR-FM being a classic hits station that focuses on 1970s and early 1980s.

On August 4, 2012, "104.5 KMCQ" re-positioned as "Q104.5, Seattle's Classic Hits." The music also underwent significant changes, with the station focusing more on classic hits from the mid-1960s through the mid-1980s, with a more streamlined playlist focused on pop and rock from the 1970s.

In February 2015, KMCQ was sold to the Educational Media Foundation for $7 million. On May 31, at 11:59 PM, Q104.5 signed off with "Lights" by Journey. The station went silent and changed its call letters to KLSW on June 1, and on the afternoon of June 2, 104.5 signed back on carrying K-LOVE programming.
