= KUYO =

- Evansville, Wyoming; United States
- Broadcast area: Casper, Wyoming
- Frequency: 830 kHz
- Branding: Bott Radio Network

Programming
- Format: Christian radio
- Network: Bott Radio Network

Ownership
- Owner: Bott Communications, Inc.

History
- First air date: October 24, 1985

Technical information
- Licensing authority: FCC
- Facility ID: 11003
- Class: D
- Power: 25,000 watts (day); 9,200 watts (critical hours)
- Transmitter coordinates: 42°52′17″N 106°12′15″W

Links
- Public license information: Public file; LMS
- Webcast: Listen live
- Website: bottradionetwork.com

KUYO (830 AM) is a radio station licensed to Evansville, Wyoming, United States, that operates during the daytime hours only. It features a Christian radio format as an owned-and-operated station of the Bott Radio Network. KUYO's transmitter is sited three miles east-northeast of Evansville, not far from KTWO.

KUYO has been heard by DXers as far away as 4,000 miles (6,437 km) in Finland.

== History ==
Previous logo before becoming an affiliate of Bott Radio Network

The station signed on October 24, 1985. It was part of a network of stations started by Christian radio pioneer Harold Erickson. His company was known as Christian Enterprise Inc.

In the late 1950s and early 1960s, Erickson started stations such as KURL, in Billings, Montana, KGVW in Belgrade, Montana (since deleted), KGLE in Glendive, Montana, KALS in Kalispell, Montana, and KNDR in Mandan, North Dakota (among others).

Christian Enterprise Inc., would eventually become Enterprise Network, of which KUYO was a part, along with four other stations. The station was sold in 1999 to Wyoming Christian Broadcasting Company. On May 1, 2025, KUYO was acquired by the Bott Radio Network (BRN).
