= KBNO-FM =

- White Salmon, Washington; United States
- Frequency: 89.3 MHz

Ownership
- Owner: World Radio Network, Inc.

History
- Last air date: September 30, 2014
- Former call signs: KBNO (2000–2001)

Technical information
- Licensing authority: FCC
- Facility ID: 92740
- Class: A
- ERP: 16 watts
- HAAT: 336 meters
- Transmitter coordinates: 45°43′23″N 121°26′42″W

Links
- Public license information: Public file; LMS

KBNO-FM (89.3 FM) was a radio station in White Salmon, Washington, United States. It was supported by donations.

The station's license was cancelled by the Federal Communications Commission on September 30, 2014, for failure to file a renewal application.
