= KDRI (AM) =

Radio station in Tucson, Arizona

Tucson, Arizona; United States
- Broadcast area: Tucson metropolitan area
- Frequency: 830 kHz
- Branding: The Drive 101.7 FM, AM 830

Programming
- Format: Oldies

Ownership
- Owner: Bustos Media; (Bustos Media Holdings, LLC)
- Sister stations: KTGV, KVOI, KZLZ

History
- First air date: July 19, 1986; 39 years ago
- Former call signs: KGLR (1982–1986); KFLT (1986–2019)
- Call sign meaning: "Drive"

Technical information
- Licensing authority: FCC
- Facility ID: 20649
- Class: B
- Power: 50,000 watts (day); 1,000 watts (night)
- Transmitter coordinates: 32°26′39.3″N 111°5′29.4″W
- Translator: 101.7 K269FV (Oro Valley)

Links
- Public license information: Public file; LMS
- Webcast: Listen Live
- Website: thedrivetucson.com

KDRI (830 kHz, "The Drive") is a radio station in Tucson, Arizona. Owned by Bustos Media, through licensee Bustos Media Holdings, LLC, it broadcasts an oldies format. It is simulcast on FM translator K269FV at 101.7 MHz in Oro Valley.

By day, KDRI is powered at 50,000 watts non-directional, the maximum for commercial AM stations. As 830 AM is a clear channel frequency reserved for Class A station WCCO in Minneapolis, KDRI reduces power at night to 1,000 watts, and switches to a directional antenna with a four-tower array. The transmitter is on Sunshine Lane off North Sandra Road in Marana. KDRI is Arizona's only "Primary Entry Point" station to the Emergency Alert System.

== History ==
A construction permit was issued in 1983 for a new station on 830 AM in Tucson to Doylan Forney. Forney had won the station, proposing to provide a middle-of-the-road music format "with an emphasis on spiritually enlightening programs", in a proceeding designed to promote ownership of radio stations by ethnic minorities. He first took the calls KGLY, then very soon after took the calls KGLR when KGVY in Green Valley objected. In 1986, he sold the CP to Family Life Radio, which had operated religious station KFLT at 1450 AM since 1977; Family Life then sold the 1450 frequency to another owner. On July 19, 1986, KFLT moved to the new 830, on the air for the first time with 50,000 watts. AM 1450 then relaunched as KKPW "Power 1450". KFLT would be on 830 AM for another 33 years.

Previous logo

On August 1, 2019, KFLT was sold to Tucson Radio, LLC, owned by local businessman Fletcher McCusker, for $650,000. In 2018, Family Life Broadcasting had acquired KQTH (104.1 FM) from Scripps Media via Lotus Communications, and flipped it to Family Life Radio as KFLT-FM, the de facto replacement for 830 AM. After stunting with novelty music as The Worm, KFLT launched a soft oldies format with a Tucson-centric presentation and local personalities targeting "boomers in cars" as The Drive, KDRI, on August 5, 2019. Veteran radio executive and personality Bobby Rich joined the station as president of Tucson Radio, program director, and morning host.

Effective June 30, 2023, Bustos Media purchased KDRI and translator K269FV from Tucson Radio, LLC. Rich's last day on air and retirement party was May 12, 2023. The Drive Tucson has now positioned themselves as "Timeless Variety" from the 60's, 70's and 80's.
