= KULE (AM) =

- Ephrata, Washington; United States
- Frequency: 730 kHz

Programming
- Format: Regional Mexican

Ownership
- Owner: Centro Familiar Cristiano

History
- Former call signs: KULE (?-1981); KTRQ (1981–1983)

Technical information
- Licensing authority: FCC
- Facility ID: 4041
- Class: D
- Power: 1,000 watts day 29 watts night
- Transmitter coordinates: 47°19′1.00″N 119°33′46.00″W
- Translator: 95.5 K238CH (Ephrata)

Links
- Public license information: Public file; LMS
- Website: laestaciondelafamilia.org

KULE (730 AM) is a radio station broadcasting a Regional Mexican / Spanish language religion format. Licensed to Ephrata, Washington, United States, the station is currently owned by Centro Familiar Cristiano.

Bustos Media used to own the station. In September 2010, Bustos transferred most of its licenses to Adelante Media Group as part of a settlement with its lenders.

Effective December 10, 2014, Bustos Media repurchased KULE from Adelante Media, along with eight other stations and a translator, for $6 million.

Effective February 8, 2019, Bustos Media sold KULE, two sister stations, and a translator to Centro Familiar Cristiano for $374,500. Shortly thereafter, KULE flipped to a Spanish format.
