= KZXR (AM) =

- Prosser, Washington; United States
- Frequency: 1310 kHz
- Branding: La Pantera

Programming
- Format: Silent (formerly Regional Mexican)

Ownership
- Owner: Iglesia Pentecostal Vispera del Fin

History
- First air date: December 14, 1956 (as KARY)
- Former call signs: KARY (1956–1998)

Technical information
- Licensing authority: FCC
- Facility ID: 53675
- Class: D
- Power: 5,000 watts day 66 watts night
- Transmitter coordinates: 46°14′3.00″N 119°48′49.00″W
- Translators: K237GY (95.3 MHz, Prosser)

Links
- Public license information: Public file; LMS

KZXR (1310 AM) is a radio station that is currently silent, but which formerly broadcast a Regional Mexican format. Licensed to Prosser, Washington, United States, the station is currently owned by Iglesia Pentecostal Vispera del Fin.

Previous owner Bustos Media took KZXR silent on April 30, 2020, due to economic circumstances related to the coronavirus pandemic.

== History ==
https://www.angelfire.com/wa/kzxr/source.html The Source 1310AM
