= KDDS-FM =

Radio station in Elma, Washington

Coordinates: 47.313°N 123.372°W

- Elma, Washington; United States
- Broadcast area: Seattle metropolitan area
- Frequency: 99.3 MHz
- Branding: La Gran D 99.3

Programming
- Format: Regional Mexican

Ownership
- Owner: Bustos Media; (Bustos Media Holdings, LLC)

History
- First air date: 1981 (as KJMD)
- Former call signs: KJMD (1980–1984); KAYO-FM (1984–2005)

Technical information
- Licensing authority: FCC
- Facility ID: 33622
- Class: C
- ERP: 64,000 watts
- HAAT: 742 meters

Links
- Public license information: Public file; LMS
- Webcast: Listen Live
- Website: laradioseattle.com

KDDS-FM (99.3 FM) is a radio station broadcasting a Regional Mexican format. Licensed to Elma, Washington, United States, it serves the Seattle area. Bustos Media used to own the station. In September 2010, Bustos transferred most of its licenses to Adelante Media Group as part of a settlement with its lenders.

Formerly, 99.3 was KAYO, licensed to Aberdeen, Washington, and played a country music format. On June 8, 2005, the station switched to their current call letters and format.

Effective December 10, 2014, Bustos Media reacquired KDDS-FM, along with eight other stations and a translator, from Adelante Media for $6 million.
