= Mass media in Portland, Oregon =

Portland, Oregon, United States supports a multitude of media, including long-established newspapers, television and radio stations; a number of smaller local art, culture, neighborhood and political publications; filmmaking; and, most recently, Internet media development. Portland has the 22nd largest newspaper, the 23rd largest radio and the 22nd largest television market in the United States. The Portland media market also serves Vancouver, Washington.

== Newspapers ==
=== Daily ===
The Oregonian is the only daily general-interest newspaper serving Portland. It also circulates throughout the state and in Clark County, Washington. The Vancouver, Washington-based newspaper The Columbian also covers general news from Portland.

=== Alternative weekly ===
Smaller local newspapers, distributed free of charge in newspaper boxes and at venues around the city

- Portland Tribune (general-interest paper published on Tuesdays and Thursdays),
- Willamette Week (general-interest alternative weekly),
- Portland Mercury (bi-weekly, targeted at younger urban readers),

=== Neighborhood newspapers ===
- Northwest Examiner, a monthly newspaper with a circulation of 23,000 distributed by saturation mailing with news from northwest Portland, Pearl District and Goose Hollow. The publisher was established in 1986.
- Southeast Examiner, a monthly newspaper with a circulation of 24,600 covering SE Portland from SE Water Ave to SE 82nd as well as NE Laurelhurst area to SE Powell Blvd.
- Southwest News is a monthly newspaper mailed to every resident of the Southwest Neighborhoods, Inc coalition and it is published by the coalition. Approximately 9,000 copies are mailed, as well as distributed in the lobby of the Multnomah Arts Center.
- Sellwood Bee is a monthly newspaper established in 1906 and serves the inner southeast neighborhoods.

=== Interest-specific ===
- The Asian Reporter (a weekly covering Asian news, both international and local),
- Christian News Northwest, a regional monthly newspaper serving the evangelical Christian community.
- Daily Journal of Commerce. Portland Monthly is a monthly news and culture magazine.
- The Portland Alliance, a largely anti-authoritarian progressive monthly, is the largest radical print paper in the city.
- Portland Business Journal, Weekly. Covers business-related news.
- Portland Indymedia is one of the oldest and largest Independent Media Centers.
- Street Roots, is a weekly street newspaper published by a homeless advocacy group Street Roots. It is sold within the city by vendors.

=== Discontinued ===
Just Out was an LGBT publication published twice monthly from 1983 to 2011.

== Television ==
The Portland metro area is the 22nd largest U.S. market area with 1,182,180 homes with TVs and 1.035% of the U.S. market. In addition, the Portland Television market area is considered as serving the entire state of Oregon. The major network television affiliates include: (Network O&O Stations are found in bold)

- 2 KATU Portland (ABC, Independent on 2.2)
- 6 KOIN Portland (CBS)
- 8 KGW Portland (NBC)
- 10 KOPB-TV Portland (OPB/PBS)
- 12 KPTV Portland (Fox)
- 22 KPXG Portland (Ion Television)**
- 24 KNMT Portland (TBN)**
- 32 KRCW-TV Salem (The CW)**
- 49 KPDX Vancouver, WA (Independent with MyNetworkTV)
- 23 KGWZ-LD Portland (Quest)
- 29 KJYY-LD Salem (Telemundo)
- 36 KEVE-LD Vancouver, WA (3ABN)
- 42 KPXG-LD Portland (Daystar)**
- 47 KUNP-LD La Grande (Independent)

== Radio ==
The Portland metro area is the 23rd largest radio market in the U.S.

=== AM stations ===
- 620 KPOJ Portland (Sports)
- 750 KXTG Portland (Sports)
- 800 KPDQ Portland (Christian radio)
- 880 KWIP Dallas (Regional Mexican)
- 910 KMTT Vancouver, WA Sports (ESPN Radio)
- 940 KWBY Woodburn (Regional Mexican)
- 970 KUFO Portland (Talk)
- 1010 KOOR Milwaukie (Spanish Rhythmic top 40)
- 1040 KXPD Tigard (Chinese)
- 1080 KRSK Portland (Sports/ESPN)
- 1190 KEX Portland (Talk)
- 1230 KRYN Gresham (Regional Mexican)
- 1410 KBNP Portland Business Talk)
- 1450 KBPS Portland (Educational/Portland Public Schools)
- 1480 KBMS Vancouver (Urban AC)
- 1520 KGDD Oregon City Regional Mexican)
- 1550 KKOV Vancouver (Silent)
- 1600 KOHI St. Helens (Talk)
- 1640 KPAM Lake Oswego (Talk)

=== FM stations ===
- 88.3 KBVM Portland (Catholic radio)
- 88.7 KRNZ Sandy (Air 1)
- 89.1 KMHD Gresham (Jazz)
- 89.5 KPFR Pine Grove (Family Radio)
- 89.9 KQAC Portland (Classical music)
- 90.3 KPOR Welches (K-Love 2000s)
- 90.7 KBOO Portland (Variety)
- 91.1 KXRY Portland (Freeform)
- 91.5 KOPB-FM Portland (Public radio/OPB/NPR)
- 92.3 KGON Portland (Classic rock)
- 93.1 KRYP Gladstone (Regional Mexican)
- 93.9 KPDQ-FM Portland (Christian radio)
- 94.3 KZZR Government Camp (Regional Mexican)
- 94.7 KNRK Camas, WA (Alternative rock)
- 95.5 KBFF Portland (Contemporary hit radio)
- 96.3 KKWA West Linn (Contemporary worship music)
- 96.7 KNUM-LP Portland (Urban contemporary)
- 97.1 KYCH-FM Portland (Adult hits)
- 97.9 KLVP Aloha (K-Love)
- 98.7 KUPL Portland (Country)
- 99.5 KWJJ-FM Portland (Country)
- 100.3 KKRZ Portland (Contemporary hit radio)
- 101.1 KXL-FM Portland (News/Talk)
- 101.9 KINK Portland (Adult album alternative)
- 103.3 KKCW Beaverton Adult contemporary)
- 104.1 KPOZ Scappoose (Air 1)
- 104.5 KPLP White Salmon, WA (Contemporary Christian)
- 105.1 KRSK-FM Molalla (Sports/ESPN Radio)
- 105.9 KFBW Vancouver, WA (Classic rock)
- 106.7 KLTH Lake Oswego (Classic hits)
- 107.5 KXJM Banks (Rhythmic hot AC)

== Internet ==
- QPDX.com, news and events website
