= Heritage Media =

American media company (1987–1997)

Heritage Media Corporation
- Type: Public
- Traded as: NYSE: HTG
- Industry: Television, radio, marketing
- Predecessor: Heritage Communications
- Founded: August 1987
- Founder: James M. Hoak Jr.
- Defunct: August 20, 1997
- Successor: News Corporation; Sinclair Broadcast Group
- Headquarters: Dallas, Texas, U.S.
- Area served: United States (nationwide)
- Revenue: ▲$10 billion USD (1996)

Heritage Media Corporation (NYSE: HTG) was a media company which owned television and radio stations across the United States, as well as in-store and direct marketing companies. It was based in Dallas from 1987 to 1997.

== History ==
Heritage Media was founded in August 1987 by a group of Heritage Communications executives to acquire the company's television and radio stations. The sale coincided with Heritage Communications' merger with Tele-Communications Inc.; at the time, Federal Communications Commission (FCC) regulations did not allow a company to own both a television station and a cable system in a market. Heritage Communications had acquired the stations through the 1985 purchase of Dakota Broadcasting and the 1986 acquisitions of Rollins Communications and six LIN Broadcasting radio stations. Heritage Media's president and chief executive officer, James M. Hoak Jr., held the same positions with Heritage Communications; the company's headquarters were located in Des Moines, Iowa (where Heritage Communications was based), until later in 1987, when it relocated to Dallas, Texas.

Heritage Media managed its television stations with more of an emphasis on cash flow than ratings, and focused its radio group on stations that it felt needed a turnaround (for instance, it had acquired KKSN AM-FM in Portland, Oregon, out of bankruptcy). To implement this strategy, the company's stations operated with large sales staffs but were otherwise staffed sparingly. Heritage Media went public in September 1988, trading on the American Stock Exchange. By then, it had invested in POP Radio, an in-store radio company, and Du-Kross Media, which sold advertisements on shopping carts. In 1989, Heritage Media purchased Actmedia, a in-store marketing company. In 1996, the company merged with DIMAC Corporation, a direct marketing services company. On July 15, 1996, Heritage Media moved its stock listing to the New York Stock Exchange.

News Corporation announced on March 17, 1997, that it would acquire Heritage Media for $754 million. The purchase was mainly for the Actmedia and DIMAC subsidiaries, and News Corporation immediately announced its intention to sell Heritage Media's broadcast properties; News Corporation's Fox Television Stations subsidiary was already at FCC ownership limits, and the company had no interest in operating radio stations. On July 16, 1997, Sinclair Broadcast Group announced that it would acquire the Heritage Media stations for $630 million. The sale to News Corporation was completed on August 20, 1997; Heritage Media's stations were then transferred to a trustee, with Sinclair assuming control of the stations in stages from January 29, 1998, to July 1998. Actmedia was folded into News Corporation's News America Marketing subsidiary.

== Former stations ==
- Stations are arranged in alphabetical order by state and city of license.

Stations owned by Heritage Media
Media market	State	Station	Purchased	Sold	Notes
Los Angeles	California	KDAY	1987	1991	
Pensacola	Florida	WEAR-TV	1987	1997	
Pensacola	Florida	WFGX	1995	1997	(Note: Owned by a third party and operated by Heritage Media.)
New Orleans	Louisiana	WBYU	1997	1997	
New Orleans	Louisiana	WEZB	1997	1997	
New Orleans	Louisiana	WRNO-FM	1997	1997	
Kansas City	Missouri	KCAZ	1997	1997	
Kansas City	Missouri	KCFX	1992	1997	
Kansas City	Missouri	KCIY	1995	1997	
Kansas City	Missouri	KQRC-FM	1997	1997	
Kansas City	Missouri	KXTR	1997	1997	
St. Louis	Missouri	KIHT	1994	1997	(Note: Known as KRJY prior to 1994.)
St. Louis	Missouri	WIL-FM	1987	1997	
St. Louis	Missouri	WRTH	1987	1997	(Note: Known as WIL prior to 1991.)
Plattsburgh	New York	WPTZ	1987	1997	
Rochester	New York	WBBF	1987	1997	
Rochester	New York	WBEE-FM	1987	1997	
Rochester	New York	WKLX	1993	1997	
Rochester	New York	WQRV	1997	1997	
Cincinnati	Ohio	WVAE	1992	1997	(Note: Known as WOFX prior to 1995.)
Oklahoma City	Oklahoma	KAUT-TV	1987	1991	
Oklahoma City	Oklahoma	KOKH-TV	1991	1997	
Portland	Oregon	KKRH	1995	1997	(Note: Known as KXYQ-FM prior to 1995.)
Portland	Oregon	KKSN	1988	1997	
Portland	Oregon	KKSN-FM	1988	1997	
Lead	South Dakota	KIVV-TV	1987	1996	(Note: Satellite of KEVN-TV.)
Rapid City	South Dakota	KEVN-TV	1987	1996	
Sioux Falls	South Dakota	KDLT	1987	1994	
Knoxville	Tennessee	WMYU	1996	1997	
Knoxville	Tennessee	WWST	1996	1997	
Burlington	Vermont	WFFF-TV	1997	1997	
Hartford	Vermont	WNNE	1990	1997	(Note: Semi-satellite of WPTZ.)
Norfolk–Virginia Beach–Newport News	Virginia	WGH	1997	1997	
Norfolk–Virginia Beach–Newport News	Virginia	WGH-FM	1997	1997	
Norfolk–Virginia Beach–Newport News	Virginia	WVCL	1997	1997	
Seattle–Tacoma	Washington	KBKS	1988	1997	(Note: Known as KPRM-FM prior to 1995 and again in 1996, and as KCIN-FM from 1995 to 1996.)
Seattle–Tacoma	Washington	KRPM	1995	1997	
Seattle–Tacoma	Washington	KULL	1988	1995	(Note: Known as KRPM prior to 1991 and again in 1995.)
Charleston–Huntington	West Virginia	WCHS-TV	1987	1997	
Milwaukee	Wisconsin	WAMG	1994	1997	(Note: Known as WEZW prior to 1995.)
Milwaukee	Wisconsin	WEMP	1988	1997	
Milwaukee	Wisconsin	WMYX-FM	1988	1997	
