= KKSN =

KKSN may refer to:

- KMTT, a radio station (910 AM) licensed to Vancouver, Washington, United States, which held the call sign KKSN from 1980 to 1998, 2005 to 2007, and 2010 to 2013
- KZPT (FM), a radio station (99.7 FM) licensed to Kansas City, Missouri, United States, which used the call sign KKSN from 2009 until 2010
- KWOD, a radio station (1390 AM) licensed to Salem, Oregon, United States, which used the call sign KKSN from 2007 until 2009
- KYCH-FM, a radio station (97.1 FM) licensed to Portland, Oregon, United States, which used the call sign KKSN-FM from 1988 until 2005
- KGDD (AM), a radio station (1520 AM) licensed to Oregon City, Oregon, United States, which used the call sign KKSN from 1998 until 2003
