= KXET =

KXET may refer to:

- KXET (AM), a defunct radio station (1150 AM) formerly licensed to serve Portland, Oregon, United States
- KGDD (AM), a radio station (1520 AM) licensed to serve Oregon City, Oregon, which held the call sign KXET in 2015 and from 2022 to 2023
- KQRR, a radio station (1130 AM) licensed to serve Mount Angel, Oregon, which held the call sign KXET from 2015 to 2022
