= KPAM (860 AM) =

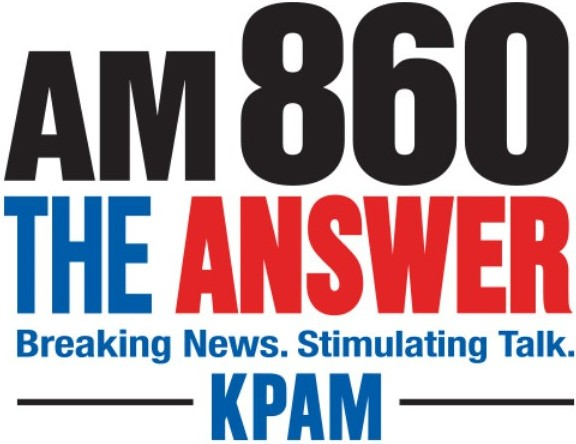
- Troutdale, Oregon; United States
- Broadcast area: Portland metropolitan area
- Frequency: 860 kHz
- Branding: AM 860 The Answer

Programming
- Format: Conservative talk
- Affiliations: Salem Radio Network; Townhall News

Ownership
- Owner: Salem Media Group; (Salem Media of Oregon, Inc.)
- Sister stations: KPAM; KPDQ; KPDQ-FM; KRYP

History
- First air date: 1997
- Last air date: May 2026
- Former call signs: KZTW (1991–1997, CP); KPAM (1997–2026); KDZR (2026)
- Call sign meaning: Pamplin Broadcasting (former owner)

Technical information
- Licensing authority: FCC
- Facility ID: 29553
- Class: B
- Power: 50,000 watts (day); 15,000 watts (night)
- Transmitter coordinates: 45°38′47.4″N 122°30′53.3″W

Links
- Public license information: Public file; LMS
- Webcast: Listen live
- Website: theanswerportland.com

KPAM (860 AM) was a commercial radio station licensed to Troutdale, Oregon, United States, and serving the Portland metropolitan area. Owned by the Salem Media Group, it featured a conservative talk format branded as "AM 860 The Answer", with studios and offices on SE Lake Road in Portland. KPAM's transmitter was sited on NE 34th Street in Vancouver, Washington. The station operated from 1997 until 2026; it closed when Salem moved its programming and call sign to 1640 AM, with the 860 AM license being canceled under that station's former KDZR call sign.

== History ==
KPAM signed on the air in 1997. It was owned by Pamplin Broadcasting, from which it took its call sign. The station initially had a contemporary Christian music format but soon switched to a talk radio format. It carried world and national news updates from ABC News Radio.

In 2018, Pamplin Broadcasting sold the station to Salem Media Group. On April 2, 2018, KPAM rebranded as "860 The Answer". It began airing the line up of Salem Radio Network programs.

On March 9, 2026, KPAM announced it would be moving its talk programming to KDZR (1640 AM) on April 1. The two stations would simulcast through April 17, and "The Answer" would air only on 1640 on April 18. The two stations swapped call signs on that date; by that May, the renamed KDZR had fallen silent after losing its transmitter site. The Federal Communications Commission cancelled the KDZR license on November 5 at Salem's request.
