= KTRO =

KTRO may refer to:

- KTRO-LP, a low-power radio station (99.9 FM) licensed to serve Espanola, New Mexico, United States
- KMTT, a radio station (910 AM) licensed to serve Vancouver, Washington, United States, which used the call sign KTRO from 2007 until 2010
- KRYP, a radio station (93.1 FM) licensed to serve Gladstone, Oregon, United States, which used the call sign KTRO-FM from 2006 until 2007
- KEDD-LD, a low-power television station (channel 27, virtual 45) licensed to serve Lancaster, California, United States, which used the call sign KTRO-LP from 2002 until 2007
- KVTA, a radio station (1520 AM) licensed to serve Port Hueneme, California, which used the call sign KTRO from 1984 until 1999
