= KGDD =

KGDD may refer to:

- KGDD (AM), a radio station (1520 AM) licensed to serve Oregon City, Oregon, United States
- KXET (AM), a defunct radio station (1150 AM) formerly licensed to serve Portland, Oregon, which held the call sign KGDD from 2015 to 2023
