= KPDQ =

KPDQ may refer to:

- KPDQ-FM, a radio station (93.9 FM) licensed to Portland, Oregon, United States
- KPDQ (AM), a radio station (800 AM) licensed to Portland, Oregon, United States
