= KRSK =

KRSK may refer to:

- KRSK (AM), a radio station (1080 AM) licensed to serve Portland, Oregon, United States
- KRSK-FM, a radio station (105.1 FM) licensed to serve Molalla, Oregon
