= KQRR =

- Mount Angel, Oregon; United States
- Broadcast area: Salem, Oregon; Portland, Oregon
- Frequency: 1130 kHz
- Branding: La Ranchera 1130

Programming
- Format: Regional Mexican

Ownership
- Owner: Bustos Media; (Bustos Media Holdings, LLC)
- Sister stations: KGDD, KOOR, KRYN, KZZR

History
- First air date: 2010 (as KPWX)
- Former call signs: KTRP (2007–2010); KPWX (2010–2011); KQRR (2011–2015); KXET (2015–2022)

Technical information
- Licensing authority: FCC
- Facility ID: 160794
- Class: B
- Power: 25,000 watts day 490 watts night
- Transmitter coordinates: 45°04′34.4″N 122°48′31.3″W

Links
- Public license information: Public file; LMS
- Webcast: Listen Live
- Website: KQRR Online

KQRR (1130 AM) is an American radio station licensed to serve the community of Mount Angel, Oregon. The station, originally licensed as KTRP, is owned by Bustos Media and the broadcast license is held by Bustos Media Holdings, LLC.

The station was assigned the call sign KQRR by the Federal Communications Commission (FCC) on December 13, 2011 and again on March 15, 2022.

In 2010, the station filed an application with the FCC to increase its day power to 50,000 watts. The application was dismissed.

On February 12, 2015, KQRR changed its call letters to KXET.

On March 15, 2022, KXET changed its call letters to KQRR. The Russian Christian radio format also moved to KQRR.

Sometime in 2025, KQRR dropped its Russian Christian format for a regional Mexican format under the branding "La Ranchera 1130".

In 2026, KQRR has been heard ID'ing as part of the La Familia / Tu Familia Spanish language religion and praise network, with Spanish language praise music and preaching.

== Programming ==
Since December 2011, the station broadcasts a Russian-language religious radio format. As KPWX, the station previously aired a Regional Mexican music format branded as "1130 La Mexicana". In 2015, KXET began broadcasting community programs, produced by Slavic Family Media Center. It was branded as Slavic Family Radio.
