= KOTK =

KOTK or KotK may refer to:

- KXCB, a radio station (1420 AM) licensed to serve Omaha, Nebraska, United States, which held the call sign KOTK from 2005 to 2019
- KMTT, a radio station (920 AM) licensed to serve Vancouver, Washington, United States, which held the call sign KOTK from 2004 to 2005
- KRSK (AM), a radio station (1080 AM) licensed to serve Portland, Oregon, United States, which held the call sign KOTK from 1997 to 2004
- KPOJ, a radio station (620 AM) licensed to serve Portland, Oregon, which held the call sign KOTK from 1995 to 1997

== See also ==
- Kattak, the eighth month of the Punjabi calendar and the Nanakshahi calendar
- King of the Kill, a 1994 album by Annihilator
- Z1 Battle Royale, a video game formerly known as King of the Kill
