= KLPM =

KLPM may refer to:

- KLPM-LP, a low-power radio station (102.5 FM) licensed to serve Lake Providence, Louisiana, United States
- KXET (AM), a defunct radio station (1150 AM) formerly licensed to serve Portland, Oregon, United States, which held the call sign KLPM from 2009 to 2011
