= KZGD =

Radio station in Salem, Oregon, U.S.

Simulcasts KRYN, Gresham, OR
- Salem, Oregon; United States
- Frequency: 1390 kHz
- Branding: La Radio de la Familia

Programming
- Language: Spanish
- Format: Christian radio

Ownership
- Owner: Iglesia Pentecostal Vispera del Fin
- Sister stations: KCKX

History
- First air date: October 3, 1934
- Former call signs: KSLM (1934–2007); KKSN (2007–2009); KVXX (2009); KWOD (2009–2014); KZZD (2014–2016)
- Former frequencies: 1370 kHz (1934–1939); 1360 kHz (1939–1941)

Technical information
- Licensing authority: FCC
- Facility ID: 72475
- Class: B
- Power: 5,000 watts (day); 690 watts (night)
- Transmitter coordinates: 44°59′42.4″N 123°4′19.4″W

Links
- Public license information: Public file; LMS

KZGD (1390 AM) is a radio station licensed to Salem, Oregon, United States. The station, founded in 1934 as KSLM, is owned by Iglesia Pentecostal Víspera del Fin and broadcasts a Spanish Christian format.

== History ==
=== The beginning ===
The station was founded in October 1934 as KSLM, a 100-watt daytime AM station broadcasting on 1370 kHz in Salem, Oregon. Owner Harry B. Read added nighttime operation in 1935. In May 1937, the Christian Science Monitor made special note that KSLM's careful commercial policy stood "as a barricade holding questionable advertising material from the ears of listeners". Read had earlier started Portland, Oregon radio station KXL and would go on to found the Salem Electric utility cooperative in 1938.

In September 1937, KSLM was one of several Pacific Northwest area stations to join the Mutual-Don Lee Broadcasting System. KSLM changed frequencies to 1360 kHz on April 28, 1939, which allowed for a power increase to 1,000 watts during the day and 500 watts at night. In 1940, the nighttime signal was raised to match the daytime power of 1,000 watts. On March 29, 1941, KSLM changed frequencies again, this time to the current 1390 kHz.

Harry B. Read sold KSLM license holder Oregon Radio, Inc., to automobile dealer Paul V. McElwain and partner Glenn E. McCormick for a reported sale price of $69,000 on March 1, 1944. At the time of the sale, it was still the only commercial radio station with Salem as its community of license. In May 1959, KSLM increased its daytime signal power to 5,000 watts and switched its network affiliation from Mutual to ABC.

=== New ownership ===
After more than four decades of continuous corporate ownership, Oregon Radio, Inc., sold KSLM to Holiday Radio, Inc., in October 1977 as part of a two-station deal valued at $684,000. The new ownership initially continued the middle-of-the-road music format that the station had been broadcasting for most of the 1970s. KSLM flipped to an adult contemporary music format in 1982.

In October 1985, Holiday Radio, Inc., reached an agreement to sell the station along with its FM sister station to Ronette Communications Corporation for $1.2 million. The deal was approved by the FCC on December 6 and the transaction was consummated on February 20, 1986. As part of an internal corporate reorganization, Ronette Communications Corporation applied to the FCC to transfer the KSLM broadcast license to Ronette Communications of Oregon, Inc., in February 1986. The transfer was approved by the FCC on February 11, 1986 and consummated on July 17, 1986. In mid-1986 the station transitioned to an oldies music format.

Just over two years later, in March 1988, Daytona Group of Oregon, Inc., contracted to sell the station to John E. Grant's 1010 Broadcasting, Inc., for $215,000. The deal was approved by the FCC on July 15, 1988, and consummated on July 26, 1988. 1010 Broadcasting, Inc., agreed in February 1992 to sell the station to K-Salem Communications (Greg Fabos, owner) for $151,000. The deal was approved by the FCC on April 6, 1992 and consummated on May 8, 1992. The station began replacing live and local disc jockeys with programming from Satellite Music Network's "Kool Gold" oldies format in February 1994.

=== Trouble ahead ===
In July 1994, K-Salem Communications reached an agreement to sell KSLM to Willamette Broadcasting Corp., Inc. The deal was approved by the FCC on November 2, 1994 and consummated on December 22, 1994. The new owners had difficulty finding a new transmitter site for the station after the sale and the station was off the air from late 1995 until early 1997.

With the station back in operation, Willamette Broadcasting Corp., Inc., announced in September 1998 that it would sell it to Entercom Communications subsidiary Entercom Portland License, LLC, for $605,000. The deal was approved by the FCC on October 22, 1998, and consummated on December 14, 1998.

=== Expanded Band assignment ===
On March 17, 1997 the FCC announced that eighty-eight stations had been given permission to move to newly available "Expanded Band" transmitting frequencies, ranging from 1610 to 1700 kHz, with KSLM authorized to move from 1390 to 1660 kHz. However, the station never procured the construction permit needed to implement the authorization, so the expanded band station was never built.

=== Changing callsigns ===
The station took on a sports talk format as a simulcast of Vancouver, Washington, sister station KFXX (910 AM, now KMTT), branded as "The Fan", just after the sale to Entercom was completed. When 910 AM became oldies-formatted KKSN, KSLM maintained the simulcast and became an oldies station. In January 2007, Entercom dropped KKSN's oldies format for talk radio as part of a pending sale to Salem Communications and KSLM began once again simulcasting sports radio KFXX, now on 1080 AM. After more than 70 years as KSLM, Entercom applied for a new callsign for this station in early 2007. The FCC changed the callsign to KKSN, the call letters of its former sister station and simulcast partner, on February 12, 2007. To better align it with Portland sister station KFXX, the callsign was changed again on January 20, 2009, this time to KVXX.

On May 1, 2009, KVXX dropped its simulcast of KFXX to begin airing Spanish language sports programming from ESPN Deportes Radio in conjunction with sister station KTRO. The station was assigned the KWOD call sign by the FCC on May 29, 2009, after an Entercom-owned station in Sacramento, California, switched to KBZC. On July 12, 2010, KWOD changed its format to English language sports, again simulcasting sister station KFXX.

On March 31, 2014, KWOD changed its callsign to KZZD and changed format to regional Mexican. The change of call sign and format was coincident with Entercom's donation of KZZD's license to the Minority Media and Telecommunications Council, Inc. (MMTC). MMTC, in turn, sold the station to Edward Distell for a purchase price of $75,249; this transaction was consummated on June 20, 2014.

On September 23, 2016, KZZD changed its callsign to KZGD. Effective June 22, 2021, Edward Distell sold KZGD and KCKX to Iglesia Pentecostal Vispera del Fin for $70,000.

== Former on-air staff ==
Peter Courtney, a member of the Oregon Senate, and President of the Senate from 2003 to 2023, was once employed by KSLM as a political commentator.
