= KXET (AM) =

Portland, Oregon; United States
- Broadcast area: Portland, Oregon
- Frequency: 1150 kHz
- Branding: La Gran D

Programming
- Format: Defunct (was Regional Mexican)

Ownership
- Owner: Bustos Media; (Bustos Media Holdings, LLC)
- Sister stations: KGDD, KOOR, KRYN, KZZR

History
- First air date: 1954 (as KHFS)
- Former call signs: KHFS (1954–1956); KKEY (1956–1998); KKGT (1998–2003); KRMZ (2003–2005); KXMG (2005–2009); KLPM (2009–2011); KXET (2011–2015); KGDD (2015–2023)

Technical information
- Licensing authority: FCC
- Facility ID: 71752
- Class: D
- Power: 5,000 watts day 10 watts night
- Transmitter coordinates: 45°31′9″N 122°36′32″W
- Translator: 93.5 K228EU (Portland)

Links
- Public license information: Public file; LMS

KXET (1150 AM) was a radio station licensed to Portland, Oregon, United States. It served the Portland area. The station was last owned by Bustos Media of Oregon License, LLC. The station had a construction permit from the FCC to increase their daytime power to 10,000 watts and nighttime to 63 watts.

== History ==
From July 4, 1954 when the station first signed on with the callsign KHFS until 1956, then KKEY was owned by the Weagant family of Vancouver, Washington. After trying several different formats throughout the 1950s and '60s, in 1971, KKEY went all talk with such hosts as Jack Hurd, Alan Hirsch, Peter Marland Jones, Jerry Dimmitt, and Rick Miller. Originally a daytime only station, KKEY was granted nighttime authorization in 1988 to operate at 47 watts. KKEY remained with primarily a talk format until the station was sold in 1998. It temporarily went off the air before signing back on as KKGT, again an all-talk station.

The station was assigned the call sign KLPM by the Federal Communications Commission (FCC) on April 14, 2009.

On January 21, 2011, KLPM changed its format to Spanish hits, branded as "Exitos 93.5", which also rebroadcast on FM translator K228EU 93.5 FM. On January 25, 2011, KLPM changed its call letters to KXET to go with the "Exitos 93.5" branding.

In June 2011, Adelante Media sold KXET and three Portland, Oregon, area sister stations to Bustos Media (through its license-holding subsidiary Bustos Media Holdings, LLC) for a combined sale price of $1,260,000. The FCC approved the transfer on August 16, 2011, and the deal was formally consummated on September 30, 2011.

During the weekend of August 13–14, 2011, KXET was taken off the air by theft of equipment in its transmitter site, however, their transmissions were still available on FM via K228EU.

It returned to the air on June 8, 2012 with a 100-watt transmitter. It received special temporary authority to transmit with 1,000 watts until a 5,000-watt transmitter is installed.

On November 17, 2012, KXET changed its format to Russian Christian, simulcasting KQRR 1130 AM Mount Angel, Oregon.

On February 5, 2015, KXET changed its call sign to KGDD and changed its format to regional Mexican, branded as "La Gran D", swapping formats with KGDD 1520 AM Oregon City, Oregon. On March 20, 2023, the two stations reversed the call sign swap, with KGDD picking up the KXET call sign.

On May 1, 2023, Bustos Media surrendered KXET's license to the FCC, who cancelled it the same day.
