= Daria O'Neill =

American radio and television personality and entertainer

- Born: Daria Eckhardt; April 26, 1971 (age 55); Tipton, Iowa, U.S.
- Education: Reed College
- Occupations: Radio show host and entertainer
- Spouse: Dallas Eliuk (m. 2007)
- Children: 1
- Website: dariaeliuk.com

Daria Eliuk (née Eckhardt; born April 26, 1971), also known professionally as Daria O'Neill, is an American radio and television personality and an entertainer based in Portland, Oregon, United States. With a background in theatre, she is known for her irreverent humor. Eliuk has also starred in local theatre productions and emceed various events. She currently hosts a podcast titled Radio Free Daria.

== Early life and media career ==
Born Daria Eckhardt on April 26, 1971, in Tipton, Iowa, and raised in Wyoming and Montana, Eliuk is a graduate with a degree in theatre from Portland's Reed College. She held jobs as a lifeguard at the Multnomah Athletic Club and as a teacher's aide at Wilson High School before she switched to a career in radio and began using "O Neill" as a stage name. She was a co-host with Mike Chase on the morning show Mike and Daria and later with Bill Prescott following Chase's departure at KNRK in Portland from April 1997 through October 2003.

She gained further prominence as the weather woman on KRCW from 1998 to 2000. In 2000, Eliuk earned a "Best Use of Breasts in a Weather Forecast" nod in the local weekly newspaper Willamette Week's annual "Best of Portland" issue. Her additional work in Portland television includes anchoring Entertainment Zone on KPDX from 2004 to 2006.

In November 2003, she joined The Afternoon Buzz With Dr. Doug, Daria and Skippy, a radio program at KRSK in Portland. In 2007, Dr. Doug and Skippy departed to host their own morning show on another station. Daria remained at KRSK and brought Mitch Elliott, a popular DJ from Seattle, on board along with producer Ted Douglass, creating The Afternoon Buzz With Daria, Mitch and Ted. The program helped her earn honors including four consecutive "Portland's Favorite Radio Personality" awards.

One of Eiluk's signature features was "Daria's Local Entertainment Guide," which she wrote herself. The daily segment mixed information about Portland area events and attractions with reminiscences from her youth and college days in addition to trivia and historical anecdotes. Material from the Entertainment Guide was later released on compact disc with proceeds going to the Dove Lewis Animal Hospital.

In 2016, Eliuk left her show at KRSK to return to KNRK to co-host Alternative Afternoons with Gustav and Daria. In August 2017, the station's parent company, Entercom, opted not to renew her contract. She launched the podcast Radio Free Daria in October 2018 and continues to write fiction and appear at Portland area events.

== Other work ==
Eiluk appeared in productions of Down South in 2002 and Bad Dates in 2005 staged by Triangle Productions. She has also modeled for Willamette Week and hosted the paper's annual political event Candidates Gone Wild in 2004 along with activist Steve Novick and others. She introduced a concert during the Salem public library's "World of Music at the Library" series in 2006. She also starred in the 2006 short film Room to Breathe with Everclear singer Art Alexakis. Eliuk has also performed several times over the years with The 3rd Floor, a sketch comedy troupe.

In addition to stage, radio and television, Eliuk has also made appearances in the realm of comics and fantasy fandom. In 2008, she took on the role of Wonder Woman for "Wonder Woman Day," a fundraiser for domestic violence services. Also in 2008, she performed the live vocal parts for both Lois Lane and Superman's mother, Lara, in The Superman Orchestra, a production at Portland's Hollywood Theater. She has also appeared at comic book shows and other fantasy events while dressed in-character.

== Personal life ==
Eliuk married Portland LumberJax goalie Dallas Eliuk on December 31, 2007. The couple welcomed their first child, Alexander Charles Eliuk, on May 26, 2009.
