= KDCQ =

- Coos Bay, Oregon; United States
- Broadcast area: Coos Bay-North Bend, Oregon
- Frequency: 92.9 MHz
- Branding: K-Dock 92.9

Programming
- Format: Classic hits
- Affiliations: Westwood One

Ownership
- Owner: Bay Cities Building Company, Inc.

History
- First air date: 1995 (at 93.5)
- Former frequencies: 93.5 MHz (1994–2006)
- Call sign meaning: K DoCQ (Dock)

Technical information
- Licensing authority: FCC
- Facility ID: 4086
- Class: C3
- ERP: 4,500 watts Temporarily at 500 watts
- HAAT: 159.6 meters (524 ft)
- Transmitter coordinates: 43°21′15″N 124°14′34″W

Links
- Public license information: Public file; LMS

KDCQ (92.9 FM, "K-Dock 92.9") is a radio station licensed to serve Coos Bay, Oregon, United States. The station, established in 1995, is owned by Bicoastal Media.

== Programming ==
KDCQ broadcasts a classic hits music format to the greater Coos Bay and North Bend, Oregon, area. Local programming includes Lexi Ryan on middays and "Mike the Bear" on weekday afternoons. The remaining dayparts are covered by the "Classic Hits"-branded satellite-delivered oldies radio network from Cumulus.

== History ==
=== The beginning ===
Bay Cities Building Company, Inc., received the original construction permit from the Federal Communications Commission for a new FM station broadcasting with 2,500 watts of effective radiated power on a frequency of 93.5 MHz on September 1, 1994. The new station was assigned the KDCQ call sign by the FCC on December 1, 1994. KDCQ received its license to cover from the FCC on July 31, 1995.

=== Move to 92.9 ===
In 2005 and 2006, KDCQ was part of a five-station frequency swap arranged by Salem Communications to allow it move KAST-FM at 92.9 MHz in Astoria, Oregon to sign-on new station KTRO-FM at 93.1 MHz in Portland, Oregon. KDCQ moved down the dial from 93.5 to 92.9 MHz, KKNU moved up from 93.1 to 93.3 MHz, KPDQ-FM moved from 93.7 to 93.9 MHz and reduced its effective radiated power from 100,000 to 50,000 watts, KTIL-FM moved from 94.1 to 94.3 MHz, and KAXQ moved way up from 94.3 to 99.7 MHz.

To accomplish its part of the move, KDCQ applied to the FCC in March 2005 for authorization to change broadcast frequencies from 93.5 to 92.9 MHz, relocate its transmitter site, change the antenna's height above average terrain to 160 meters (520 ft), and increase its effective radiated power to 4,500 watts. The FCC granted the station a new construction permit to authorize these changes on July 14, 2005. KDCQ made the switch to 92.9 MHz on January 28, 2006, operating under the program test authority granted by the construction permit. KDCQ received a license to cover these changes on May 2, 2006.

=== Fire ===
A fire broke out in the KDCQ transmitter building at 4:00pm on March 2, 2008. The blaze, which also affected five other local radio stations and a taxicab company, damaged the shared transmitter building, destroyed the phone lines and miscellaneous equipment, and ruined KDCQ's transmitting equipment. Engineers restored the station to operation on March 5, 2008, using leased equipment in a temporary building but at a reduced effective radiated power of just 500 watts. Bay Cities Building Company filed a notification of this change with the FCC on March 12, 2008.

On March 26, 2008, the station applied to the FCC for special temporary authority to remain at 500 watts for up to 60 days while issues with their insurance company were resolved and the main transmitter building and its equipment could be replaced. The FCC granted this authority on March 27, 2008, with a scheduled expiration date of June 27, 2008.

Just two days before the original special temporary authority was set to expire, KDCQ applied for an extension. The station told the FCC that little progress was being made with the insurance company and that they were in "a Catch-22 situation". Their engineering consultants advise against repairing the old equipment because of all the smoke and water damage but the station is unable to purchase new equipment without a "coverage reimbursement payment" from the insurance company.

The FCC did not act on this application, allowing the station to continue operating at reduced power under the previous authorization, until May 22, 2009, when they granted the requested extension with a new scheduled expiration date of November 22, 2009.

== Facilities ==
The original KDCQ radio studios were located on the second floor of the Bay Cities Ambulance building on Ocean Boulevard until January 2008. K-DOCK was relocated to Broadway Ave. in North Bend Oregon in January 2008. In 2023, Bay Cities Building Company sold KDCQ to Bicoastal Media and relocated the studios to the Hall Building, sharing the space with other Bicoastal Media studios, such as 107.3/107.7 KOOS FM.
