= KMTT (disambiguation) =

KMTT may refer to:

- KMTT, a radio station (910 AM) licensed to serve Vancouver, Washington, United States
- KHTP, a radio station (103.7 FM) licensed to serve Tacoma, Washington, which held the call signs KMTT or KMTT-FM from 1991 to 2013
- KMTT, a Torah-content podcast produced by the Virtual Beit Midrash of Yeshivat Har Etzion
- Kuomintang (KMT), a centre-right political party in the Republic of China on Taiwan
