= KCKX =

Radio station in Stayton, Oregon

Simulcasts KRYN Gresham
- Stayton, Oregon; United States
- Frequency: 1460 kHz
- Branding: La Radio de la Familia

Programming
- Format: Spanish language Christian radio

Ownership
- Owner: Iglesia Pentecostal Vispera del Fin
- Sister stations: KZGD

History
- First air date: 1987

Technical information
- Licensing authority: FCC
- Facility ID: 65569
- Class: D
- Power: 1,000 watts (day); 15 watts (night)
- Transmitter coordinates: 44°48′10″N 122°44′03″W

Links
- Public license information: Public file; LMS

KCKX (1460 AM) is a Spanish language Christian radio station licensed to Stayton, Oregon. It is currently owned by Iglesia Pentecostal Vispera del Fin.

By day, KCKX is powered at 1,000 watts. But at night, to protect other stations on 1460 AM from interference, it greatly reduces power to 15 watts.

== History ==
This station received its original construction permit for a new 1,000 watt daytime-only AM signal from the Federal Communications Commission on October 11, 1984. The new station was assigned the call letters KCKX by the FCC in 1984. In January 1986, permit holder Elizabeth I. Wamsley applied to transfer the construction permit to Azelco, Inc. The transfer was approved by the FCC on May 27, 1986, and the transaction was consummated on July 14, 1986.

After the transfer and multiple extensions, KCKX received its license to cover from the FCC on August 11, 1987.

In March 1988, Azelco, Inc., reached an agreement to sell this station to Communications Arts, Inc. The deal was approved by the FCC on June 22, 1988, and the transaction was consummated on July 1, 1988.

In December 1990, Communications Arts, Inc., agreed to sell KCKX to The Concord Group, Inc. The deal was approved by the FCC on February 8, 1991, and the transaction was consummated on September 17, 1991. This change would prove short-lived as The Concord Group, Inc., announced an agreement in June 1992 to sell this station to Spotlight Communications, Inc. The deal was approved by the FCC on July 28, 1992, and the transaction was consummated on September 9, 1992.

In September 1997, Spotlight Communications, Inc., reached an agreement to sell this station to Donald D. Coss. The deal was approved by the FCC on January 21, 1998, and the transaction was consummated on February 23, 1998.

In early 2009, KCKX was broadcasting a Spanish-language religious radio format. Branded as "Ondas de Gozo" (literally, "Waves of Joy"), KCKX was the first Spanish Christian radio station in the state of Oregon.

Effective June 2, 2014, KCKX was sold to Edward C. Distell along with KWBY for $150,000.

On June 24, 2014, KCKX changed their format from ESPN Deportes Radio (Spanish language sports) to a simulcast of regional Mexican-formatted KWBY 940 AM Woodburn.

Effective June 22, 2021, Edward Distell sold KCKX and KZGD to Iglesia Pentecostal Vispera del Fin for $70,000.
