= KNRK =

- Camas, Washington; United States
- Broadcast area: Portland metropolitan area
- Frequency: 94.7 MHz (HD Radio)
- Branding: 94/7 Alternative Portland

Programming
- Language: English
- Format: Alternative rock
- Subchannels: HD2: Classic alternative "KNRK-2"

Ownership
- Owner: Audacy, Inc.; (Audacy License, LLC)
- Sister stations: KGON; KMTT; KRSK; KRSK-FM; KWJJ-FM; KYCH-FM

History
- First air date: November 1, 1992; 33 years ago
- Former call signs: KMUZ-FM (1992–95)
- Call sign meaning: "New Rock"

Technical information
- Licensing authority: FCC
- Facility ID: 51213
- Class: C2
- ERP: 6,300 watts
- HAAT: 403 meters (1,322 ft)
- Transmitter coordinates: 45°29′19.4″N 122°41′44.3″W

Links
- Public license information: Public file; LMS
- Webcast: Listen live (via Audacy); Listen Live (HD2)
- Website: www.audacy.com/947

KNRK (94.7 FM) is a commercial radio station licensed to Camas, Washington, serving the Portland metropolitan area. It is owned by Audacy, Inc. and airs an alternative rock radio format. KNRK's studios and offices are located on SW Bancroft Street in Downtown Portland. while the station transmitter is located off SW Fairmont Court in Portland.

== Programming ==
The station played mostly alternative rock tracks from 2004 until 2020 when it expanded its format to include alternative-leaning pop, R&B, and hip-hop. By 2022, the station had shifted back toward strictly alternative rock.

== History ==
On November 1, 1992, KMUZ-FM signed on the air. It was owned by Pacific Northwest Broadcasting, along with KMUZ (now KRYN). The station aired the Bonneville Beautiful Music format. It was powered at 3,200 watts on the 223-foot (68 m) PGE tower on Mt. Scott in SE Portland, so it only could be heard from north to south, from Battleground to Wilsonville, and from Forest Grove to Troutdale.

On March 6, 1995, KMUZ-FM switched to alternative rock as "94-7 NRK"; the KNRK call letters would officially be adopted on April 28 of that year. The station's playlist was made up of alternative rock music by bands such as The Smashing Pumpkins, Pearl Jam and Nirvana. Radio personalities Stephanie Steele and Mike Chase hosted a morning show dubbed "S & M." A DJ who only goes by his middle name, Gustav, hosted weekday afternoons. Gradually, the station's format began to shift towards harder rock music in the late 1990s. Conventional DJs like Gustav and Daria O'Neill were gradually replaced by "shock-jocks." Music from bands like Limp Bizkit, Korn, Puddle of Mudd and Godsmack made up much of the playlist.

The station's harder edge came to an end on May 12, 2004. Two morning DJs played audio recordings of Nick Berg's violent death on the air and added their own commentary, which many listeners found offensive. Hundreds of angry phone-calls and e-mails flooded into the station. KNRK's General Manager fired both of them, along with their producer.

Following the incident, KNRK temporarily pulled all of its DJs off the air and played only music and commercials, in addition to the nationally syndicated talk show Loveline in the evenings. Brief messages by station program director Mark Hamilton explained the changes and plans to reshape the station. Listeners were encouraged to submit their ideas via an online survey or to call in with their own suggestions. Soon thereafter, KNRK became "94/7 FM - Alternative Portland." Several former KNRK DJs returned, and the station's music, while still alternative, leaned a bit more pop.

Throughout the remainder of the 2000s and 2010s, it featured specialty shows like "Passport Approved," which focused on international rock music. On Sundays, an experimental program known as "The Bottom Forty" aired and served as an alternative to conventional Top 40 countdown shows. The station also aired "Greasy Kid Stuff," a Saturday morning program that specialized in music for children. Daria O'Neill returned to host a weekday afternoon show with Gustav in 2017, but departed again in August 2018 after her contract wasn't renewed.

KNRK's parent company, Entercom, began changing the station's format in 2020. Program Director Mark Hamilton was removed from his position that September and transferred to sister station KYCH. The termination of several on-air personalities soon followed, including longtime DJ Gustav, who had been at KNRK since 1995. In their place were DJs airing recorded programming from other markets. The music mix also shifted to a current pop-heavy playlist. During this period, the station's ratings sunk to record lows. In August 2022, the station dropped the out of market DJs and returned to being programmed locally by Mark Hamilton.

== HD Radio ==
KNRK broadcasts in the HD Radio format. In 2007, KNRK introduced "94/7 Too," an online station focusing entirely on bands based or initially established in the Pacific Northwest. It was added to over-the-air radio on 910 AM in July 2010. That station flipped format to sports talk in 2013, with "94/7 Too" moving to 94.7FM's HD2 signal and streaming online. New personalities were added in 2015 (Derric in the evenings) and 2016 (Middays with Pepper). In 2020, "94/7 Too" was replaced with "KNRK-2", which features a classic alternative rock format.
