= KGON =

Radio station in Portland, Oregon

- Portland, Oregon; United States
- Broadcast area: Portland metropolitan area
- Frequency: 92.3 MHz (HD Radio)
- Branding: 92-3 KGON

Programming
- Format: Classic rock
- Affiliations: Seattle Seahawks Radio Network

Ownership
- Owner: Audacy, Inc.; (Audacy License, LLC)
- Sister stations: KMTT; KNRK; KRSK; KRSK-FM; KWJJ-FM; KYCH-FM

History
- First air date: December 6, 1967; 58 years ago
- Former call signs: KLIQ-FM (1967–73)
- Call sign meaning: Oregon

Technical information
- Licensing authority: FCC
- Facility ID: 2432
- Class: C
- ERP: 100,000 watts
- HAAT: 386 meters (1,266 ft)
- Transmitter coordinates: 45°29′19.4″N 122°41′44.3″W

Links
- Public license information: Public file; LMS
- Webcast: Listen live (via Audacy)
- Website: www.audacy.com/kgon

KGON (92.3 FM) is a commercial radio station in Portland, Oregon. The station airs a classic rock radio format and is owned by Audacy, Inc. KGON broadcasts in the HD Radio format. Its HD2 subchannel formerly carried a blues format, known as "Waterfront Blues Radio."

KGON's offices and studios are located south of Downtown Portland on Bancroft Street. The transmitter site is in the city's Southwest Hills district, off SW Seymour Street. KGON has an effective radiated power (ERP) of 100,000 watts, the maximum for most FM stations. The signal covers much of Northwestern Oregon and Southwestern Washington.

== Programming ==
KGON competes with iHeartMedia-owned KFBW. While KFBW plays mostly rock from the 1980s, 1990s and a few 2000s titles, KGON goes back as far as The Beatles for some selections and rarely plays titles later than 1990. KGON also carries Seattle Seahawks football games during the NFL season.

== History ==
The station signed on the air on December 6, 1967. Its original call sign was KLIQ-FM. It was the FM counterpart to KLIQ (AM 1290), which is no longer on the air. The two stations were owned by the Cascade Broadcasting Company, simulcasting a talk radio format. Because KLIQ was a daytimer, the station's programming could only be heard on KLIQ-FM after dark.

In 1973, as more people bought radios that received FM stations, KLIQ-FM was sold to KYXI, Inc., the same firm that owned KYXI (now AM 1520, KGDD). On February 1, 1974, the new owners changed the format to album-oriented rock under new call sign KGON. The first song after the flip was "Here Comes the Sun" by The Beatles. The flip put KGON in competition with KINK, which went on the air in 1968 as a freeform radio station, along with KQIV, which signed on in 1972 playing progressive rock. KGON was programmed with a more structured format, playing only the most popular tracks from the top-selling rock albums. It would continue in this direction until November 4, 1992, when it shifted to its current classic rock direction.

In 1992, KGON and KFXX (the former KYXI) were bought by Apogee Communications for $5.5 million. In 1995, the station changed hands after just three years when Entercom acquired KGON. Entercom changed its name to Audacy in 2021.
