= KPOZ =

Air1 radio station in Portland, Oregon

- Scappoose, Oregon; United States
- Broadcast area: Portland metropolitan area
- Frequency: 104.1 MHz
- Branding: Air1

Programming
- Language: English
- Format: Contemporary worship music
- Affiliations: Air1

Ownership
- Owner: Educational Media Foundation; (K-LOVE, Inc.)
- Sister stations: KLVP; KRNZ; KPOR

History
- First air date: April 1981 (as KTIL-FM in Tillamook); September 1, 2001 (as KFIS in Scappoose)
- Former call signs: Tillamook: KTIL-FM (1981–1999); KJUN (1999–2001); Scappoose: KFIS (2001–2025)

Technical information
- Licensing authority: FCC
- Facility ID: 50553
- Class: C2
- ERP: 6,900 watts; 7,000 with beam tilt
- HAAT: 386 meters (1,266 ft)
- Transmitter coordinates: 45°29′20″N 122°41′40″W

Links
- Public license information: Public file; LMS
- Webcast: Listen live
- Website: air1.com

KPOZ (104.1 FM) is a radio station licensed to Scappoose, Oregon, and serving the Portland metropolitan area. The station is owned by the Educational Media Foundation (EMF). It airs a contemporary worship music format, part of EMF's national Air1 network.

== History ==
In April 1981, the station first signed on the air as KTIL-FM in Tillamook, and was the FM counterpart to KTIL (AM 1590). The two stations simulcasted a full service middle of the road format of popular music, news and sports, and were owned by the Beaver Broadcasting Company. Because Tillamook is nearly 50 miles from Portland, separated by tall mountains, the station was not audible in Oregon's largest radio market. In 1999, the station's call letters were changed to KJUN, and flipped to an oldies format.

In 2000, Salem Media bought KJUN for $35.8 million. The station already had a construction permit from the Federal Communications Commission to move its city of license to Scappoose and relocate its transmitter to Portland in order to give the station better coverage of the market. However, its signal is not as strong as many other Portland FM stations, which have an effective radiated power of 100,000 watts. KFIS is powered at 6,900 watts and is a Class C2 and has an effective radiated power of 50,000 watts (7,000 with beam tilt).

Salem changed the station's call letters to KFIS to reflect the "Fish" branding for its Contemporary Christian format. On September 1, 2001, it signed on from its new location, joining Salem's existing Portland stations KPDQ and KPDQ-FM, which air Christian talk and teaching formats.

An FM station in the Tillamook area of Oregon, KIXT, switched its call sign to KTIL-FM in 2006.

On December 30, 2024, Salem Media Group announced the sale of KFIS and six other Christian AC stations to Educational Media Foundation for $80 million in order to pay off the company’s debt. A few weeks later, it was announced that the station would begin airing the nationwide Air1 Christian worship network. Operation as KPOZ began immediately after Midnight on February 1, 2025, with the station officially operating as Air1. The final song aired was also the first song ever broadcast on the station, Shout to the Lord by Lincoln Brewster.

== See also ==
- List of radio stations in Washington (state)
