= Rupert Kinnard =

American cartoonist (born 1954)

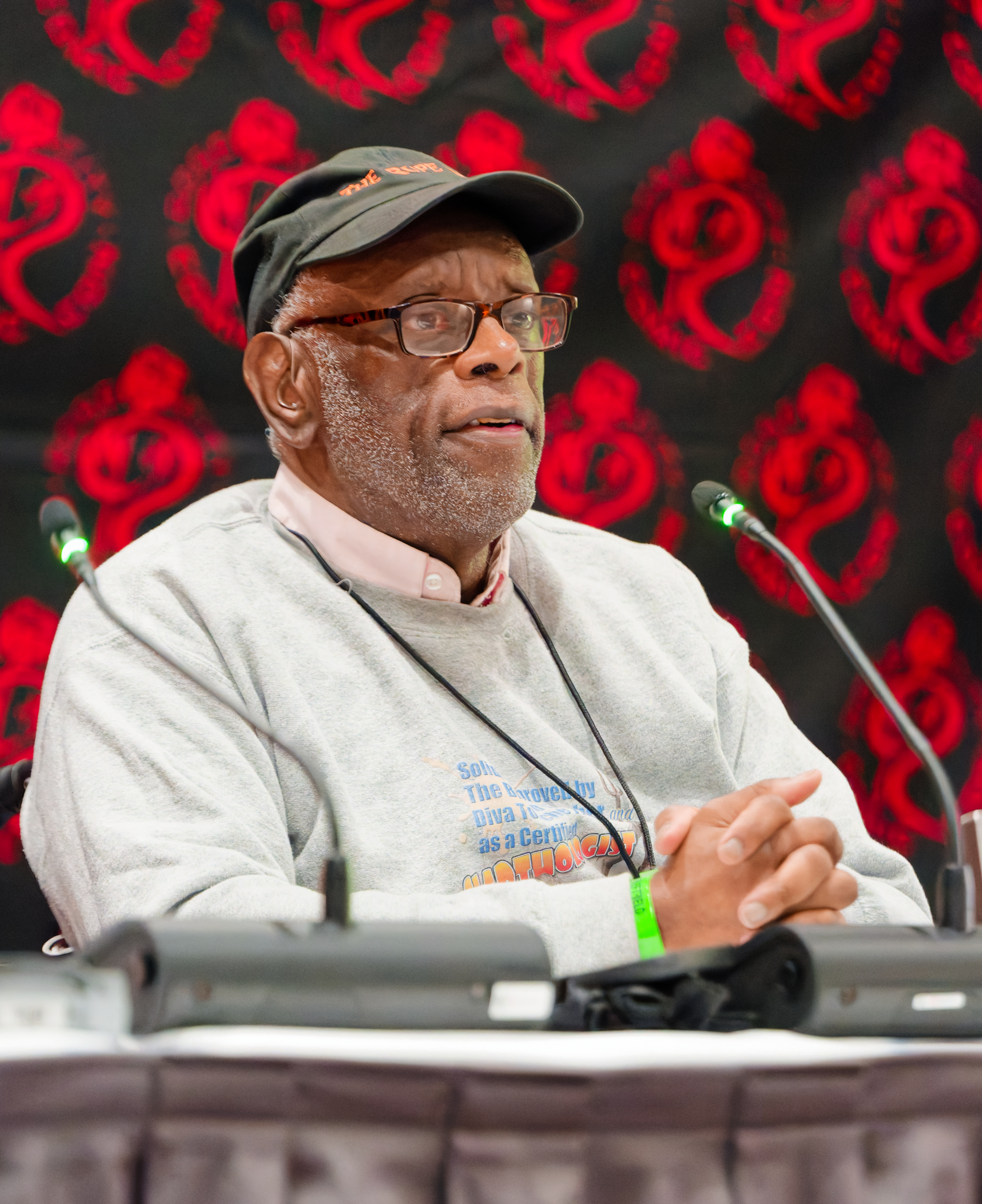
- Rupert Kinnard at Rose City Comic Con in 2025
- Born: Rupert Earl Kinnard; 1954 (age 71–72) Chicago, Illinois, U.S.
- Area: Cartoonist
- Pseudonym: Prof. I.B. Gittendowne
- Notable works: B.B. and the Diva

Rupert Kinnard (born 1954) also credited as Prof. I.B. Gittendowne, is an American cartoonist who created the first ongoing gay/lesbian-identified African-American comic-strip characters: the Brown Bomber (a teenage superhero) and Diva Touché Flambé (his ageless lesbian partner). Kinnard is gay and African American. His book, Ooops...I Just Catharted! Fifty Years of Cathartic Comics, which was published in 2025, was nominated for an Eisner Award in 2026.

== Biography ==
Rupert Kinnard was born in Chicago in 1954, and spent his early years living on the West Side. He moved with his parents and four sisters to a 16th-floor apartment in then-new housing projects, then to the South Side, where he attended Morgan Park High and later the Chicago Public Schools' High School for Metropolitan Studies. After graduating, he attended American Academy of Art.

In 1972, teenage Kinnard noticed that not only were all of his favorite superheroes white, but even the comics characters he'd created himself didn't reflect his racial identity. He responded by creating Superbad, a Black-militant figure inspired by boxer/activist Muhammad Ali.

In 1976, he enrolled at Cornell College in Iowa. In 1977, he created Brown Bomber, a less aggressive African-American character, modeled after boxer Joe Louis (who was also known by that nickname). The character was featured in a comic strip published weekly in the Cornellian, the college newspaper. After the character became popular on campus, Kinnard wrote a strip which identified the character as gay.

He graduated from college in 1979, and moved to Portland, Oregon, where he began working for alternative newspaper Willamette Week, eventually as associate art director. In 1983 he co-founded Just Out, Oregon's first LGBTQ publication. In 1984, he created the lesbian African-American character Diva Touché Flambé and featured her with Brown Bomber in the strip "Cathartic Comics". He then became the first African American to serve on the board of the Portland Town Council, the state's first LGBTQ organization, and helped to establish The Diversity Alliance, a multicultural LGBTQ group.

Upon moving to the San Francisco Bay Area in 1986, Kinnard served as art director for the San Francisco Sentinel, where "Cathartic Comics" began running as a weekly strip featured on the editorial page. In 1989, the strip began running in SF Weekly, and also appeared in gay publications in other major cities. A collection of the strips was published in 1992 by Alyson Books as B.B. and the Diva with a foreword by Marlon Riggs. In 2025, "Ooops..I Just Catharted! Fifty Years of Cathartic Comics", the current most complete compilation of the groundbreaking comic strip, was released. After leaving SF Weekly, he became art director of Out/Look, a queer journal.

After moving back to Portland in 1993, he and six other men formed the Portland chapter of Brother to Brother, a social organization for African-American queer men.

In April 1996, Kinnard was involved in an automobile accident that left him paralyzed from the waist down, a day after attending his grandmother's funeral just outside of Jonestown, Mississippi.

He and his partner Scott Stapley were among the plaintiffs in Martinez vs. Kulongoski, an unsuccessful 2008 court challenge to 2004's Oregon Ballot Measure 36, which defined marriage narrowly as the union of a man and a woman.

Kinnard and Stapley own and operate the Kinley Manor Guest House in Portland. He is working on a graphic memoir, to be called The LifeCapsule Project.

== Artistic influences and works ==
Kinnard's influences include underground cartoonist Howard Cruse, quadriplegic cartoonist John Callahan, cartoonist and memoirist Alison Bechdel, filmmaker Marlon Riggs, poet Essex Hemphill, cartoonist Lynda Barry, and historian Allan Bérubé.

Kinnard's writings, illustrations, and cartoons have been published in Meatmen: An Anthology of Gay Male Comics; A Queer Sense of Humor; The Indelible Alison Bechdel: Confessions, Comix, and Miscellaneous Dykes to Watch Out For; Juicy Mother; No Straight Lines; and in LGBTQ publications such as Portland's Just Out, Bay Area Reporter, Chicago's Windy City Times, and the literary lesbian and gay journal Out/Look magazine.

Through his company, The Rupe Group Graphics, Kinnard has worked with Portland's Black United Front, Portland Storefront Theater, PassinArt, Theater Group, the National Organization for Women, National Lawyers Guild, CAP Northwest (formerly Cascade AIDS Project), the Workers’ Organizing Committee, and Oregonians Against the Death Penalty, along with California Newsreel, Gay and Lesbian Press Association, National Lesbian and Gay Journalists Association, Oakland Tribune, and San Francisco's Theater Rhinoceros.

== Awards and recognition ==
Two of Kinnard's publications received the National Gay Press Association award for best overall design: Just Out (1983) and the San Francisco Sentinel (1987).

In 1992, his "Cathartic Comics" strip was featured as part of the San Francisco Cartoon Art Museum's "Black Ink: An Exhibit of African American Cartoonists", and original panels from it were included in the museum's permanent collection.

The Brown Bomber and Diva Touché Flambé were portrayed on stage in 1994, in Out of the Inkwell, a Theater Rhinoceros production in San Francisco, also featuring characters from Doonesbury.

He received Pride Northwest's "Spirit of Pride" award in 1996.

In 1997, Kinnard took part in A Tip of the Nib, the nation's first Lesbian and Gay Cartoonist conference, at Oberlin College, which also included artists Howard Cruse and Allison Bechdel.

Kinnard's business The Rupe Group Graphics was awarded the Oregon Cascade AIDS Project's Community Angel Award in 2007.

In 2013, he received a "Standing on the Shoulders" Lifetime Achievement Award from the World Arts Foundation, which stated that his "artistic talent and leadership to reach out to the LGBTQ community honors the legacy of the Rev. Dr. Martin Luther King Jr."

He was a featured panelist at the first Queers & Comics conference in May 2015, as one of the "Pioneers of Queer Men's Comics" and a speaker on "Queer Comics, Health and Dis/Ability".

In 2019, Kinnard was awarded the Portland Monthly's Light a Fire Lifetime Achievement Award.

On June 12, 2021, the feature-length documentary film No Straight Lines: The Rise of Queer Comics, which featured the works of Kinnard; Alison Bechdel (Fun Home); Jennifer Camper (Rude Girls and Dangerous Women); Howard Cruse (Gay Comix); and Mary Wings (Come Out Comics), premiered at the Tribeca Festival. The film was broadcast on national PBS in 2023.

On August 20, 2021, Kinnard was one of the ribbon cutters during the dedication of Portland's “Never Look Away" mural which celebrates the struggles and accomplishments of the LGBTQ+ community. The block long mural features Kinnard; David Martinez, a founding board member of Portland's Q Center; activist and musician Kathleen Saadat; gay liberation activist Marsha P. Johnson; and transgender rights advocates Angelica Ross and Aydian Dowling.

In 2022, Kinnard was invited to create a show of original artwork in an exhibit entitled "From Cornell to Cathartica: A History of Cathartic Comics" at Cornell College, where he also received the school's highest honor, the Distinguished Alumni Achievement Award.
