= KPLP =

Satellite of KGTS/Walla Walla, Washington
- White Salmon, Washington; United States
- Broadcast area: Northwest Oregon, Southwest/Mid-Southern Washington, The Dalles
- Frequency: 104.5 MHz
- Branding: Positive Life Radio

Programming
- Format: Contemporary Christian

Ownership
- Owner: Walla Walla University

History
- First air date: July 15, 2019
- Former call signs: KXXP (2018–2022)
- Call sign meaning: Positive Life Portland

Technical information
- Licensing authority: FCC
- Facility ID: 198745
- Class: C1
- ERP: 18,000 watts
- HAAT: 433 meters (1,421 ft)
- Transmitter coordinates: 45°31′14.4″N 121°28′51.2″W

Links
- Public license information: Public file; LMS
- Webcast: Listen Live
- Website: plr.org

KPLP (104.5 FM) is a non-commercial radio station in White Salmon, Washington. It is owned by Walla Walla University, and it airs a Contemporary Christian radio format. The signal rimshots the Portland Metro and covers the Southwestern and the mid-Southern part of Washington as well having a city grade signal in The Dalles.

On April 5, 2021, Bustos Media began operating the station under a local marketing agreement and flipped the station from soft oldies to Spanish-language rhythmic top 40, simulcasting KOOR 1010 AM Milwaukie, Oregon.

Effective June 2, 2022, Jackman Holding Company, LLC sold the then-KXXP to Walla Walla University, officially ending Bustos Media's LMA. With it, Bustos Media moved the Spanish Rhythmic Top 40 format back to KOOR. The station changed its call sign to KPLP on July 7, 2022 and began to carry WWU's Positive Life Radio network full-time from KGTS in Walla Walla without any local programming.
