= KZZR =

- Government Camp, Oregon; United States
- Frequency: 94.3 MHz
- Branding: La Zeta 94.3

Programming
- Format: Regional Mexican

Ownership
- Owner: Bustos Media; (Bustos Media Holdings, LLC)
- Sister stations: KGDD, KOOR

History
- First air date: November 1998 (as KJUN at 94.1 in Tillamook)
- Former call signs: Tillamook: KJUN (1997–1999); KTIL-FM (1999–2010); Government Camp: KZPT (2010)
- Former frequencies: 94.1 MHz (1999–2006, Tillamook, OR)

Technical information
- Licensing authority: FCC
- Facility ID: 82538
- Class: C2
- ERP: 3,400 watts
- HAAT: 513 meters (1,683 feet)
- Transmitter coordinates: 45°20′01″N 121°42′45″W

Links
- Public license information: Public file; LMS
- Webcast: Listen Live
- Website: laradiodeportland.com

KZZR (94.3 FM, "La Zeta 94.3") is an American radio station licensed to serve Government Camp, Oregon, United States. The station, which began broadcast operations in 1998, is owned and operated by Bustos Media while the station's broadcast license is held by Bustos Media Holdings, LLC. Until February 2011, the station had been licensed to serve the community of Tillamook, Oregon. The transmitter site is near Mount Hood, and studios are in Southeast Portland.

== Programming ==
Until 2010, KZZR broadcast an oldies-leaning adult contemporary music format. In addition to its usual music programming, the station broadcast Tillamook High School football and basketball games, University of Oregon Ducks football games, and the NBA's Portland Trail Blazers basketball games. After going dark for more than six months, KZZR returned to the air in early 2011 with a Regional Mexican music format.

== History ==
This station received its original construction permit from the Federal Communications Commission on December 1, 1997. The new station was assigned the call letters KJUN by the FCC on December 19, 1997.

In November 1998, Bedrock & Associates, through its Thunderegg Wireless LLC subsidiary, applied to transfer the construction permit for this station at 94.1 MHz to Oregon Eagle, Inc. The transfer was approved by the FCC on February 4, 1999, and the transaction was consummated on February 24, 1999. On this same day, the transfer of the license for a station at 104.1 MHz (the original KTIL-FM, now known as KFIS) from Oregon Eagle, Inc., to Thunderegg Wireless LLC was also consummated, completing a planned ownership swap.

KJUN received its license to cover from the FCC on February 25, 1999. The station was assigned the KTIL-FM call letters by the Federal Communications Commission on March 8, 1999.

Former logo

Originally licensed to broadcast at 94.1 MHz, KTIL-FM shifted to 94.3 MHz in early 2006 as part of a multi-station "frequency shuffle" that also saw Portland's KPDQ-FM move from 93.7 to 93.9 MHz and KAST-FM (now KRYP) relocate from 92.9 to 93.1 MHz and move into the Portland market.

== Move to Government Camp ==
Then-current station licensee Oregon Eagle, Inc., filed an application with the FCC in January 2007 to make several minor changes to their broadcast license. The construction permit issued on November 5, 2008, authorizes the station to upgrade from class C3 to class C2, to increase the effective radiated power of their broadcast signal to 3,400 watts, elevate their antenna to 513 meters (1,683 feet) in height above average terrain, and relocate the transmitter significantly east to 45°20'01"N, 121°42'45"W with a change in community of license to Government Camp, Oregon. The station received a license to cover these changes on February 18, 2011.

== New ownership ==
On December 8, 2009, Oregon Eagle Inc. reached an agreement to sell KTIL-FM to Bustos Media for $265,000 in cash. The FCC accepted the application to transfer the broadcast license on December 10, 2009, and the sale was approved by the Commission on March 18, 2010. When the transaction was consummated on June 1, 2010, this became Bustos Media's fifth radio station, and their first FM, in the greater Portland, Oregon, area.

The station fell silent on June 1, 2010, while construction continued at the Government Camp transmitter location. The licensee asserted that "late Spring snows" on Mount Hood had "hampered" their efforts to relocate equipment to the new site. The station was expected to be off the air between 30 and 60 days. The new owners had the FCC change the station's call sign to KZPT on June 10, 2010, and then change it to KZZR on October 25, 2010. The station returned to the air with a Regional Mexican music format in early 2011.
