= KPAM =

Regional Mexican radio station in Portland, Oregon

- Lake Oswego, Oregon; United States
- Broadcast area: Portland metropolitan area
- Frequency: 1640 kHz
- Branding: AM 1640 The Answer

Programming
- Format: Conservative talk

Ownership
- Owner: Salem Media Group; (Salem Media of Oregon, Inc.)
- Sister stations: KPDQ; KPDQ-FM; KRYP

History
- First air date: October 20, 1997
- Former call signs: KKJY (1997–1999); KPBC (1999–2003); KDZR (2003–2026)
- Call sign meaning: Pamplin Broadcasting, former owner of KPAM (860 AM)

Technical information
- Licensing authority: FCC
- Facility ID: 86618
- Class: B
- Power: 10,000 watts (day); 1,000 watts (night)
- Transmitter coordinates: 45°28′38.4″N 122°45′5.3″W

Links
- Public license information: Public file; LMS
- Webcast: Listen live
- Website: theanswerportland.com

KPAM (1640 AM) is a commercial radio station, licensed to Lake Oswego, Oregon, and serving the Portland metropolitan area. The station airs a conservative talk format and is owned by the Salem Media Group. KPAM's studios and offices are on SE Lake Road in Portland.

The transmitter is off SE Eastview Drive in Happy Valley, Oregon. KPAM is powered at 10,000 watts by day, but at night reduces power to 1,000 watts, to reduce interference to other stations on AM 1640. The station uses a non-directional antenna at all times.

== History ==
KPAM began as the "expanded band" twin to station KPHP, which broadcast on the standard AM band. On March 17, 1997, the Federal Communications Commission (FCC) announced that 88 stations had been given permission to move to newly available "Expanded Band" transmitting frequencies, ranging from 1610 to 1700 kHz, with then-KPHP, also in Lake Oswego, authorized to move from 1290 kHz to 1640 kHz.

The FCC's initial policy was that both the original station and its expanded band counterpart could operate simultaneously for up to five years, after which owners would have to turn in one of the two licenses, depending on whether they preferred the new assignment or elected to remain on the original frequency, although this deadline was extended multiple times. It was ultimately decided to transfer full operations to the expanded band station, and on February 23, 2006, the license for original station on 1290 kHz, which had subsequently changed its call sign to KKSL, was canceled.

On October 20, 1997, the new expanded band station on 1640 kHz first signed on, as KKJY. It aired a Christian radio format in AM stereo, and was owned by Crawford Broadcasting. On November 1, 1999, the station changed its call sign to KPBC while maintaining its religious format.

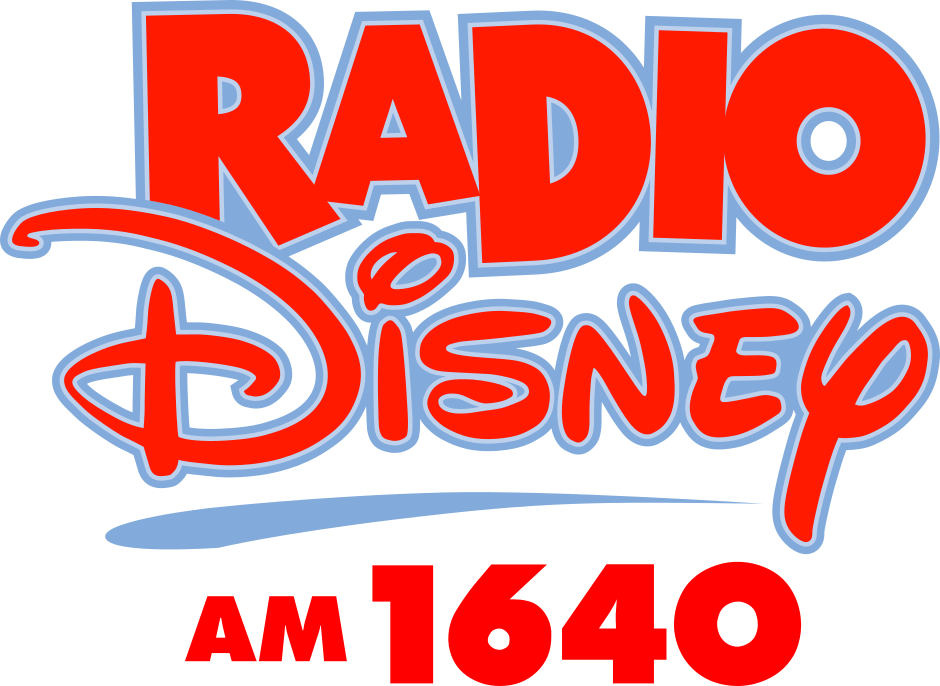
KDZR logo used from 2003 until 2007.

On February 14, 2003, the station switched its call sign to KDZR. It was acquired by the Walt Disney Company for use as the Portland network affiliate for its Radio Disney children's/contemporary hit radio service. On February 16, the station began stunting with "Be Our Guest" from Beauty and the Beast in preparation for the switch to the Radio Disney format, which occurred on February 18. In 2006, KDZR discontinued broadcasting in AM stereo.

On August 13, 2014, Disney put KDZR and 22 other Radio Disney stations up for sale, to focus on digital distribution of the Radio Disney network.

On September 15, 2015, the Salem Media Group announced it would acquire the last five Radio Disney owned-and-operated stations still available for sale, including KDZR, for $2.225 million. KDZR was acquired through Salem Media of Oregon, Inc., for $275,000. The Radio Disney format ended on November 27.

The sale was completed on December 4, 2015. KDZR returned to the air that same day, carrying a conservative talk format, branded as "Talk 1640". On April 2, 2018, KDZR made some adjustments to its program schedule and rebranded as "AM 1640 The Patriot". The move coincided with Salem beginning a local marketing agreement (LMA) to operate and program another Portland-area conservative talk station, KPAM (860 AM), which began calling itself "AM 860 The Answer".

On June 1, 2021, KDZR changed its format from conservative talk to regional Mexican, branded as "La Patrona 1640". On January 13, 2025, KDZR went silent due to blown transmitter capacitors.

On April 1, 2026, KDZR returned to the air simulcasting KPAM's conservative talk format. The simulcast lasted until April 17, on April 18, "The Answer" began airing only on AM 1640, with the KPAM call letters moving to 1640 AM.

== Previous talk programming ==
KDZR previously aired nationally syndicated shows, primarily from the Salem Radio Network, including Mike Gallagher, Hugh Hewitt, Larry Elder, Jay Sekulow and Joe Walsh. Late mornings, the station also carried Washington D.C.–based Chris Plante from the Westwood One Network. Weekends featured a mix of talk shows and paid brokered programming. Weekend hosts include Clark Howard, Rudy Maxa, Dennis Prager and Eric Metaxas. Most hours begin with world and national news from Townhall News.

In addition to KDZR, Salem also operated another conservative talk station in the Portland radio market, KPAM (860 AM). Salem did own KPAM but has a local marketing agreement (LMA) to operate and program the station. Some Salem Radio Network shows that were not carried weekdays on KDZR were heard on KPAM, including Dennis Prager, Sebastian Gorka and Michael Medved.
