= Just Out =

Defunct LGBT publication in Portland, Oregon, U.S.

- A Just Out cover story on Storm Large
- Type: Monthly magazine
- Format: Glossy Magazine
- Owner(s): Glenn-Kipp Publishing, Inc
- Publisher: Jonathan Kipp
- Founded: 1983
- Ceased publication: 2013
- Language: English
- Headquarters: Portland, Oregon
- Circulation: Portland metropolitan area
- Website: justout.com

Just Out was an LGBTQ publication in Portland, Oregon founded in 1983 by Jay Brown and Renee LaChance. It ceased publication as a semimonthly newspaper in December 2011. In February 2012, Glenn-Kipp Publishing, Inc purchased the Just Out brand assets. Just Out ceased being published as a monthly LGBTQ magazine in February 2013.

The magazine was available for free at hundreds of businesses across the Portland metropolitan area, and free digital copies are available as PDF files on the web site.

Former contributors to Just Out include novelist Marc Acito, Pink Martini pianist Thomas Lauderdale, former Willamette Week art director and Cathartic Comics founder Rupert Kinnard, and reporter and author Peter Zuckerman. USA Today best-selling author Andy Mangels also wrote for the newspaper multiple times over a 25-year period, mostly in the early 2000s.

== History ==
The newspaper's web site used to list many outdoor boxes and other places where Just Out was distributed at no charge. These drop sites could be found throughout the Portland metro area. Up until the mid-2000s there were drop sites elsewhere in Oregon. By the time the paper stopped publication in December 2011, some communities across Oregon had begun receiving Just Out again, including two distribution points in Klamath Falls.

On January 21, 2009, Just Out's editorial board issued a statement calling on recently inaugurated Portland mayor Sam Adams to resign, in light of his admission that he had covered up a sexual relationship with a state legislative intern in order to avoid disruptions to his mayoral campaign.

Mid-March 2009, three employees — news editor Jaymee Cuti, arts-and-culture editor Jim Radosta, and art director Blake Martinez — resigned because they had not been paid in full since late January, nor on time for six months. Publisher Marty Davis cited the economic recession and a resulting downturn in ad revenue as the cause of financial troubles.

On December 26, 2011, publisher Marty Davis announced that Just Out was out of business effective immediately, with its December 9 issue being its last.

On February 14, 2012, it was announced that Glenn-Kipp Publishing, Inc., had acquired Just Out, with Jonathan Kipp as the new publisher, and that Just Out would resume publication. Kipp had contributed to Just Out previously, for two years. It returned as a monthly magazine on June 1, 2012, and ceased publication in February 2013.

== See also ==
- LGBTQ culture in Portland, Oregon
- PQ Monthly
- QPDX.com
