= KWJJ-FM =

- Portland, Oregon; United States
- Broadcast area: Portland metropolitan area
- Frequency: 99.5 MHz (HD Radio)
- Branding: 99.5 The Wolf

Programming
- Language: English
- Format: Country
- Subchannels: HD2: Channel Q

Ownership
- Owner: Audacy, Inc.; (Audacy License, LLC)
- Sister stations: KGON; KMTT; KNRK; KRSK; KRSK-FM; KYCH-FM

History
- First air date: September 16, 1968; 57 years ago
- Former call signs: KJIB (1968–85)
- Call sign meaning: Wilbur J. Jerman, founder of the original KWJJ, now KRSK

Technical information
- Licensing authority: FCC
- Facility ID: 13738
- Class: C1
- ERP: 52,000 watts
- HAAT: 386 meters (1,266 ft)
- Transmitter coordinates: 45°29′19.4″N 122°41′44.3″W

Links
- Public license information: Public file; LMS
- Webcast: Listen live (via Audacy)
- Website: www.audacy.com/thewolfonline

KWJJ-FM (99.5 MHz) is a commercial radio station in Portland, Oregon. It is owned by Audacy, Inc. and airs a country music radio format. The studio is on SW Bancroft Street, near downtown Portland. The station transmitter is atop Portland's West Hills, off SW Fairmount Court.

== History ==
=== Beautiful music KJIB ===
The station signed on the air on September 16, 1968, as KJIB. It was a stand-alone FM station, not attached to an AM station. KJIB was owned by Contemporary FM, Inc., with Bernard D. Seitz serving as owner and general manager. It aired a beautiful music format featuring mostly instrumental cover versions of popular songs along with Broadway and Hollywood showtunes. The call sign referred to a "jib," a type of sail used on sailboats.

In 1974, KJIB was acquired by Park Communications, which owned other easy listening stations around the country. A year earlier, Park bought KWJJ (AM 1080), a longtime Portland country music station. For the first years of Park ownership, KJIB remained easy listening and KWJJ remained country.

=== Switch to country ===
In the late 1970s, Park moved KJIB from mainstream easy listening to a new format known as "Beautiful Country." The sound was soft, but used instrumental cover versions of country songs, rather than pop songs.

KJIB switched to a conventional country format in the early 1980s. The FM station played mostly contemporary country hits with only a small amount of DJ chatter, while the AM station continued as a personality-oriented country outlet, going back several decades for its playlist of country tunes. On August 19, 1985, KJIB changed its call sign to the current KWJJ-FM. The two stations simulcast the morning show and some other segments during the day. In 1995, KWJJ became a network affiliate for ABC's Real Country, a classic country service.

=== Change in ownership ===
In 1996, Seattle-based Fisher Communications bought KWJJ-AM-FM for $35 million. Fisher continued the mainstream country format on KWJJ-FM and briefly continued the classic country format on KWJJ (AM). The following year, KWJJ (AM) was rebranded as hot talk KOTK.

In 2003, Fisher Communications sold KOTK and KWJJ-FM to Entercom for $44 million. Entercom changed KOTK into an all-sports station, KFXX. KWJJ-FM continued as a country outlet. On January 6, 2004, KWJJ-FM rebranded as "99.5 The Wolf".

== Jingles and imaging ==
KWJJ uses the "Reelworld One Country" jingles package and imaging service after dropping the "IQ Beats" custom package in 2009. Sweepers are done by Emily Mcintosh and Jack Murphy. This is Mcintosh's tenth country client and her fifth "Wolf" station to do sweepers and custom liners.

== HD Radio ==
KWJJ broadcasts in the HD Radio format. The station carries two co-owned sports radio stations on its subchannels; KWJJ-FM HD2 formerly aired a simulcast of KRSK, known as "The Fan". On October 26, 2015, KWJJ-FM HD3 launched with a simulcast of KMTT, known as "910 ESPN Portland." As of November 2025, KWJJ-FM HD2 switched to Audacy's "Channel Q" LGBTQ service. KWJJ-FM HD3 has since been turned off.

== See also ==
- List of radio stations in Washington (state)
