= QPDX.com =

LGBTQ news website in Portland, Oregon

qPDX.com
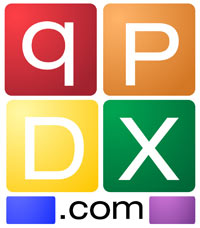
- Official qPDX.com logo
- Type: Weblog
- Editor-in-chief: Alley Hector
- Staff writers: Perry Eising, Lyska Mondor
- Founded: 2005
- Language: English
- Headquarters: Portland
- Price: Free
- Website: qpdx.com

qPDX.com is a news and events website dedicated to covering the LGBT communities of Portland, Oregon. The site is in blog format and features event listings, personal and classified ads, photo archives, movie reviews, sports news, entertainment and nightlife coverage, gossip, political and social commentary, and gay rights coverage. Principal writer Alley Hector established qPDX as a column for OregonLive.com in 2005, before the project became independent as qPDX.com in the wake of the crisis in LGBTQ news media in 2008, which resulted in local writers for rival publication Just Out walking out of Just Out's offices. qPDX.com quickly became the leading source of information on grassroots activism and homophobic assaults in the city. qPDX.com is staffed entirely by volunteers, and is one of Portland's principal sources of queer related news.
