= Heritage Cablevision =

Heritage Cablevision was the dominant cable-television provider in the Des Moines, Iowa, metro area during the 1980s. It was purchased by Tele-Communications Inc. in 1987. Heritage was founded in 1971 by James S. Cownie and was at one time the 9th-largest cable television service in the United States. Areas once served by Heritage Cablevision are now served by Mediacom.
