= Multnomah Arts Center =

Historic building in Portland, Oregon, U.S.

- U.S. National Register of Historic Places
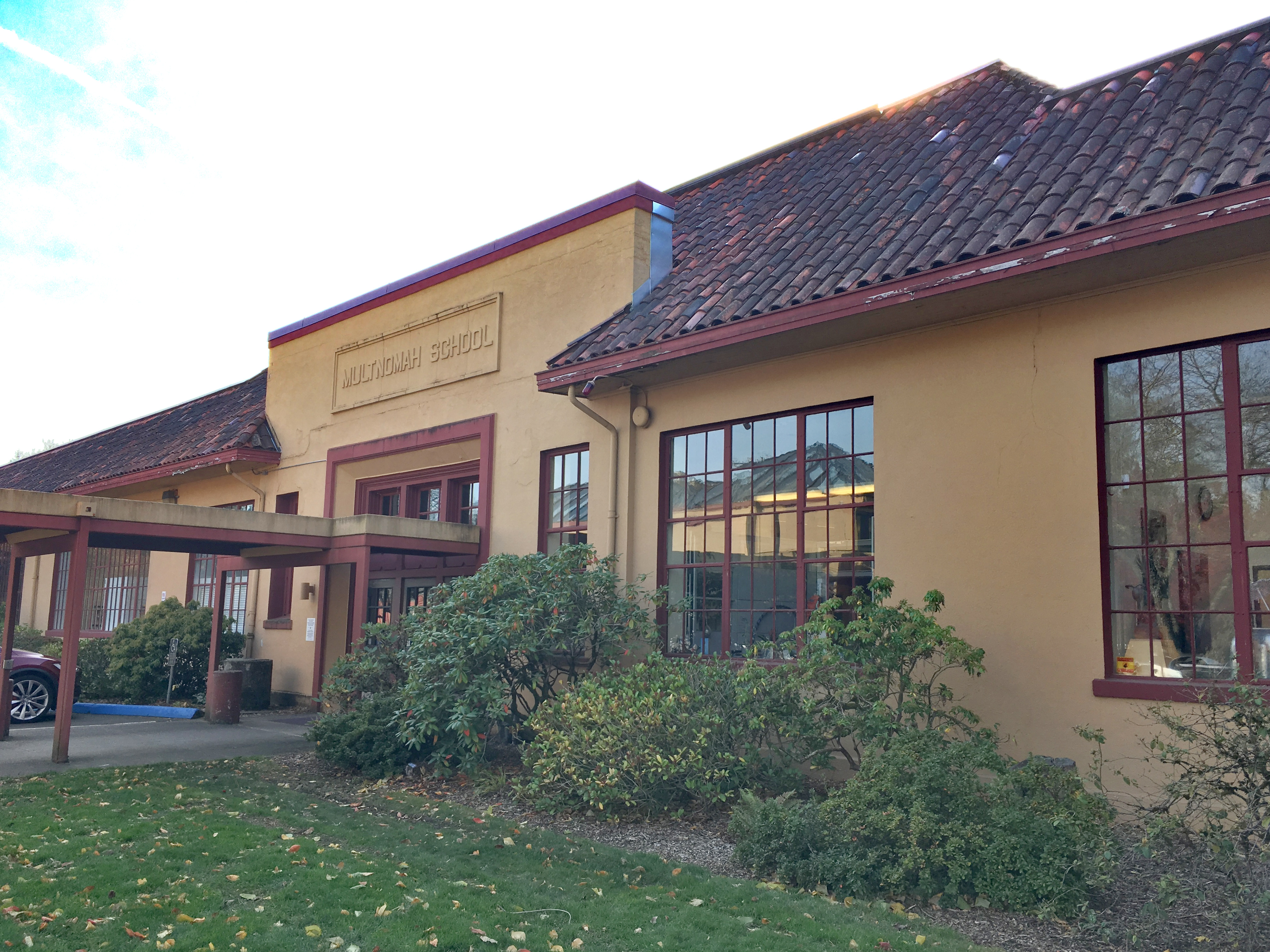
- The building's exterior, 2019

- Location within Oregon Location within Portland, Oregon
- Location: Portland, Oregon, U.S.
- Coordinates: 45.4682°N 122.7100°W
- Website: www.multnomahartscenter.org
- NRHP reference No.: 100005016

The Multnomah Arts Center (MAC) is on Capitol Highway in southwest Portland, Oregon, United States. It is a city facility operated by Portland Parks & Recreation. The building was completed in 1923 and previously housed a school called Multnomah School. MAC hosts activities related to ceramics, metalwork, textile arts, and visual arts. There are also dance, music, and theatre programs. The building is listed on the National Register of Historic Places.

== See also ==
- National Register of Historic Places listings in South and Southwest Portland, Oregon
