= KLVP =

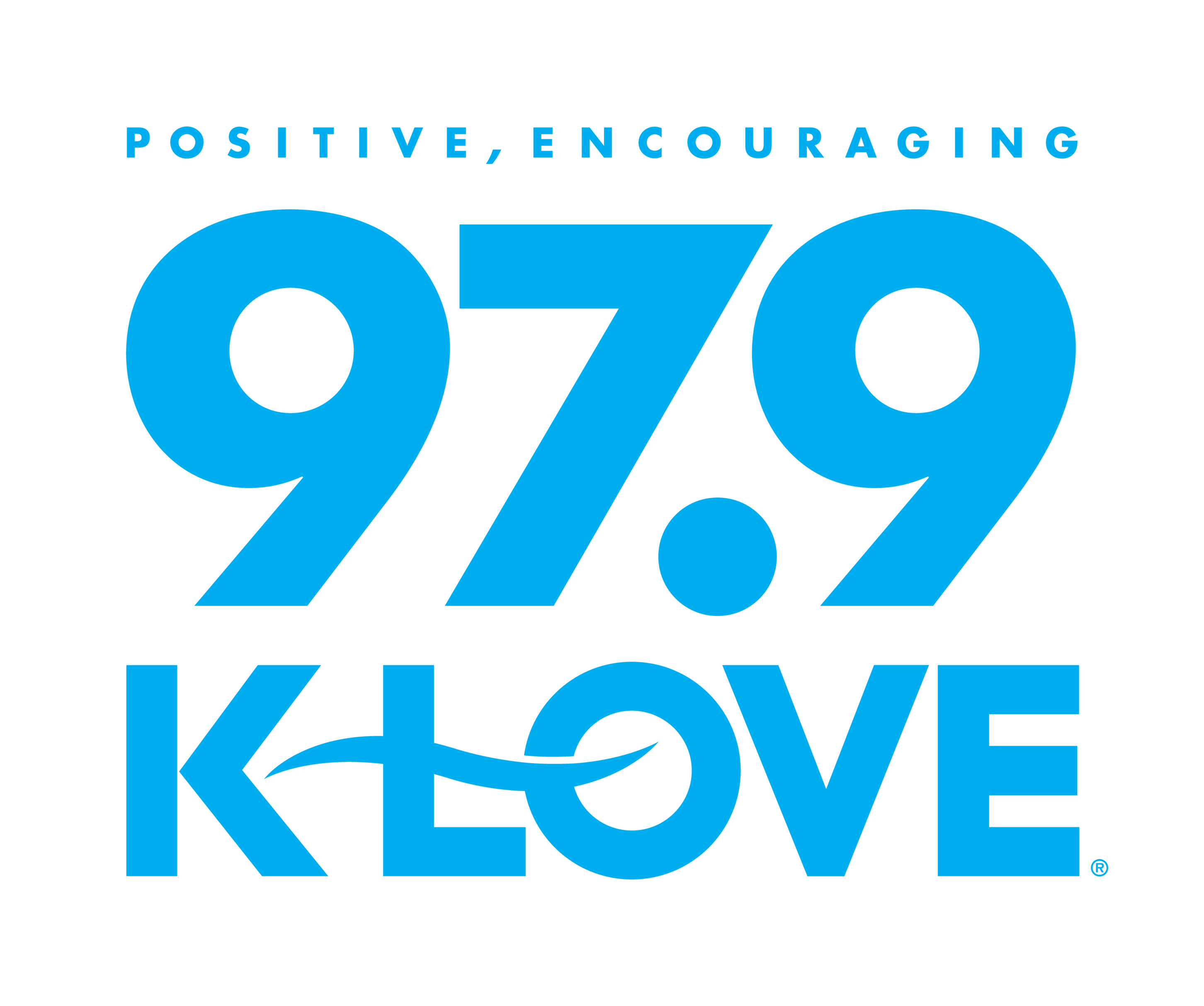
- Aloha, Oregon; United States
- Broadcast area: Portland metropolitan area
- Frequency: 97.9 MHz (HD Radio)

Programming
- Format: Contemporary Christian
- Subchannels: HD2: K-Love Eras; HD3: Christian hip hop "Boost Radio"; HD4: Radio Nueva Vida
- Network: K-Love

Ownership
- Owner: Educational Media Foundation; (K-LOVE, Inc.)
- Sister stations: KPOZ, KRNZ, KPOR

History
- First air date: December 26, 1958
- Former call signs: KFMY (1958–1978); KUGN-FM (1978–1998); KKTT (1998–2001); KNRQ-FM (2001–2013); KXPC-FM (2013)
- Call sign meaning: K-Love Portland

Technical information
- Licensing authority: FCC
- Facility ID: 12501
- Class: C1
- ERP: 54,000 watts
- HAAT: 387 meters (1,270 ft)
- Transmitter coordinates: 45°29′20″N 122°41′40″W
- Translators: HD2: 97.5 K248BS (Newberg); HD3: 103.7 K279BO (Portland); HD4: 95.9 K240CZ (Tigard)

Links
- Public license information: Public file; LMS
- Webcast: Listen Live
- Website: www.klove.com

KLVP (97.9 FM) is a noncommercial radio station licensed to Aloha, Oregon, United States, and serving the Portland metropolitan area. Owned by the Educational Media Foundation, the station airs a Christian contemporary format as the Portland affiliate for K-Love.

The transmitter is located on SW Fairmount Court in Portland's West Hills.

== History ==
=== KFMY ===
KLVP is considered a "move-in" station, established outside the Portland metropolitan area, but later moved in to serve the large Portland radio market. It began in Eugene, 100 miles (160 km) south of Portland. On December 26, 1958, the station first signed on as KFMY.

The station was owned by a company calling itself KFMY Music, Inc. Its studios and offices were in the penthouse at the Eugene Medical Center. Initially, KFMY was powered at 3,600 watts. In the late 1960s, KFMY became a progressive rock station and an ABC FM affiliate.

=== KUGN-FM ===
In 1978, KFMY was acquired by the same company that owned KUGN (AM 590). On August 9, 1978, the call sign was changed to KUGN-FM, and flipped to a country music format.

In 1997, Citadel Communications acquired KUGN-AM-FM. To give it a separate identity from the AM station, the call sign for the FM station was changed to KKTT on March 16, 1998. The KKTT call letters matched the new “Cat Country 98” branding. In 2000, Citadel Communications was merged into Cumulus Media.

=== KNRQ-FM ===
On August 15, 2001, Cumulus flipped KKTT to the alternative rock format and branding formerly heard on 95.3 FM, as KKTT’s call sign became KNRQ-FM.

=== Educational Media Foundation ===
The Educational Media Foundation (EMF) had acquired an FM station located about 40 miles (64 km) north of Eugene, KXPC-FM (103.7) in Lebanon. With its 100,000 watt transmitter, it could be heard in the Eugene area. However, EMF wanted to have its K-Love Contemporary Christian format heard in the larger Portland media market.

On August 31, 2012, it was announced that the Educational Media Foundation would sell KXPC-FM to Cumulus, allowing it to move its alternative station, KNRQ, to 103.7. Cumulus would then give up 97.9 so EMF could relocate that station to the suburbs of Portland. On July 28, 2013, at Midnight, Cumulus moved KNRQ's programming to 103.7 FM. The KXPC call letters were then switched to 97.9, and a new Portland-area transmitter began testing the signal on 97.9 MHz with automated music. The swap between EMF and Cumulus was completed on August 1, 2013.

KXPC-FM's former 103.7 frequency was granted a U.S. Federal Communications Commission (FCC) construction permit to change its city of license to Harrisburg, and move its tower closer to Eugene.

On September 30, 2013, KXPC returned to the air on 97.9 FM, with Aloha as its new city of license, airing the K-Love network. On October 29, 2013, KXPC changed its call letters to KLVP.

== HD Radio ==
KLVP airs EMF's Air 1 Christian worship format on its HD2 subchannel and K-Love Classics (contemporary Christian hits from the 1980s, 1990s and 2000s) on its HD3 subchannel. On May 9, 2019, KLVP-HD3 began simulcasting on translator K279BO (103.7 FM), replacing the "Legend" classic country format (which is still airing on KFBW-HD3).

On July 20, 2021, KLVP-HD3/K279BO changed their format from K-Love 90s to Christian rhythmic, branded as "Boost Radio".
