= KPOR =

- Welches, Oregon; United States
- Broadcast area: Mt Hood area and the far eastern part of the Portland, Oregon metropolitan area
- Frequency: 90.3 MHz
- Branding: K-Love 2000's

Programming
- Format: 2000s Christian contemporary music

Ownership
- Owner: Educational Media Foundation
- Sister stations: KLVP; KPOZ

History
- First air date: 2001 (as KZRI)
- Former call signs: KZRI (2001–2013); KXPC (2013–2021); KNOF (2021); KXPC (2021)
- Call sign meaning: K PORtland

Technical information
- Licensing authority: FCC
- Facility ID: 91542
- Class: C3
- ERP: 230 watts
- HAAT: 531 meters (1,742 ft)
- Transmitter coordinates: 45°20′01″N 121°42′45″W

Links
- Public license information: Public file; LMS
- Webcast: Listen live

KPOR (90.3 FM) is a radio station licensed to serve Welches, Oregon, and the eastern part of the Portland, Oregon, United States, radio market. The station is owned, and the broadcast license held, by the Educational Media Foundation.

== History ==
The 90.3 frequency in Welches has been network-fed its entire life, beginning as an Air 1 outlet in 2001.

The station was heard on 102.7 in Gresham and 92.7 in Vancouver Washington to improve its signal in the Portland area.

Two other translators in the Portland area at 95.9 and 96.3 were rebroadcasting KLVP 88.7.

In 2013, KXPC moved from Eugene to Portland.

What was KLVP on 88.7 took the KZRI call letters and Air1 affiliation.

KXPC, which briefly was on 97.9, took the KLVP callsign from 88.7.

Around the same time, 92.7 was upgraded and moved to Portland, continuing to rebroadcast KZRI, now at 88.7.

The 96.3 signal was a rebroadcast of KZRI until its move to 103.7, when it was leased to iHeart Media and started broadcasting as Tailgate Country 103.7.

The 102.7 signal was leased to Alpha Media to rebroadcast KXTG, leaving 92.7 as the Air1 signal directly in Portland.

KXPC's repeater in Portland is on 95.9.

On May 12, 2021, KXPC changed its call sign to KPOR.

In February 2025, after KFIS-FM and six other Christian contemporary music stations owned by the Salem Media Group were bought by Educational Media Foundation for $80 million, that station adopted the Air1 format as KPOZ, while KPOR dropped the Radio Nueva Vida network and replaced it with K-Love 2000's.

== See also ==
- KNRQ
- KLVP
