= KRSK-FM =

Simulcast of KRSK Portland
- Molalla, Oregon; United States
- Broadcast area: Portland metropolitan area
- Frequency: 105.1 MHz (HD Radio)
- Branding: 105.1 The Fan

Programming
- Language: English
- Format: Sports
- Subchannels: HD2: KMTT simulcast

Ownership
- Owner: Audacy, Inc.; (Audacy License, LLC)
- Sister stations: KGON; KMTT; KNRK; KRSK; KWJJ-FM; KYCH-FM

History
- First air date: July 3, 1970; 55 years ago
- Former call signs: KSLM-FM (1970–73); KORI (1973–78); KSKD (1978–86); KXYQ (1986–94); KXYQ-FM (1994–95); KKRH (1995–98); KRSK (1998–2025)
- Call sign meaning: "Rosie" (former branding)

Technical information
- Licensing authority: FCC
- Facility ID: 68213
- Class: C1
- ERP: 22,500 watts
- HAAT: 470 meters (1,540 ft)
- Transmitter coordinates: 45°31′20.4″N 122°44′49.4″W

Links
- Public license information: Public file; LMS
- Webcast: Listen live
- Website: www.audacy.com/1051thefan

KRSK-FM (105.1 MHz, "105.1 The Fan") is a commercial radio station licensed to Molalla, Oregon, and broadcasting to the Portland metropolitan area. It is owned by Audacy, Inc. and airs a sports radio format. The station broadcasts in HD Radio. The HD-2 subchannel carries a simulcast of sister station KMTT.

KRSK-FM's studios and offices are located in Portland's South Waterfront district on SW Bancroft Street. The transmitter site is in the city's West Hills, off NW Skyline Boulevard. KRSK-FM has an effective radiated power (ERP) of 22,500 watts.

== History ==
On July 3, 1970, KSLM-FM signed on the air. It was originally licensed to Salem, about 40 miles (64 km) south of Portland. It was owned by Oregon Radio, Inc. and was the FM counterpart of KSLM (now KZGD).

In 1973, it changed its call sign to KORI. In 1978, KORI changed call letters to KSKD and aired the automated "TM Stereo Rock" Top 40 music service as "Cascade 105". On March 7, 1986, KSKD changed call letters to KXYQ and aired a live and local Top 40 format as "Q105", switching to adult contemporary in 1991. On June 15, 1995, at 5 p.m., after a few hours of stunting, KXYQ changed its format to classic rock, branded as "Earth 105", with the call letters becoming KKRH on July 17, 1995.

Entercom (now Audacy) acquired the station in 1998 for $605,000. On June 5, 1998, at 5 p.m., KKRH began airing a hot adult contemporary format as "Rosie 105". It changed its call letters to the current KRSK on August 28, 1998. In January 2000, the spelling changed to "Rosey 105" after a copyright lawsuit by Rosie O'Donnell.

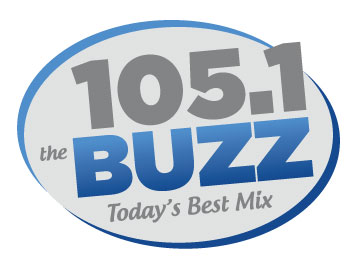
Logo as 105.1 the Buzz, 2014-2024

On April 14, 2003, KRSK rebranded as "105.1 The Buzz".

The station downgraded from a class C to a C1 to move the transmitter site into the population center of the Portland radio market in 2004. The city of license was changed from Salem to Molalla, as the transmitter was moved to Portland's West Hills.

In 2011, KRSK began adding more contemporary pop currents, moving the station in an Adult Top 40 direction.

On March 1, 2024, at noon, KRSK relaunched as "Bella 105". The first song on “Bella” was “Wrecking Ball” by Miley Cyrus.

In March 2025, as part of a company-wide series of layoffs at Audacy, station program director Jamie "Tanch" Tanchnyk left his position. On July 14 of that year, multiple radio news outlets began reporting that KRSK would imminently drop the "Bella" branding, and the Hot AC format entirely after 27 years, and begin simulcasting co-owned sports talk radio outlet KFXX as "105.1 The Fan"; one such outlet, RadioInsight, would inadvertently confirm the reports by revealing Audacy had registered the new website 1051thefan.com for the station in its report. The "Bella" format had completely stagnated in the market's Nielsen Audio ratings, with just a 2.6 in the May books. It was eventually confirmed by Audacy, which announced the flip would take place on July 22 at 6:00 a.m.. The final song played on “Bella” was “I’m Not The Only One” by Sam Smith.

On July 24, 2025, Audacy filed to change KFXX's call sign to KRSK, with KRSK (FM) adding the -FM suffix to the existing call sign, effective August 14, 2025.

== HD Radio ==
KRSK broadcasts in the HD Radio format. In 2006, KRSK added an HD2 subcarrier to its transmitter. The HD-2 subchannel carried a comedy radio format. In July 2011, KRSK-HD2 switched to a blues format as "The Delta." On March 14, 2017, KRSK-HD2 flipped to the Radio Disney children's radio service. On June 1, 2018, KRSK-HD2 switched to a love songs/Soft AC format. In March 2019, KRSK-HD2 switched from love songs to LGBTQ talk/dance, branded as "Channel Q". As of November 2025, the HD2 subchannel has switched to a simulcast of sister station KMTT, which broadcasts a sports radio format.

In June 2010, KRSK added an HD3 subchannel to its lineup, which broadcast ESPN Deportes Radio, a Spanish-language sports radio format, which would only last a couple of months. In August, it switched to ESPNews. That lasted until July 2011, when the HD3 subchannel was discontinued.
