= KOOR =

Russian-language radio station in Milwaukie–Portland, Oregon

- Milwaukie, Oregon; United States
- Broadcast area: Portland metropolitan area
- Frequency: 1010 kHz
- Branding: Urbana 1010

Programming
- Language: Spanish
- Format: Rhythmic contemporary

Ownership
- Owner: Bustos Media; (Bustos Media Holdings, LLC)
- Sister stations: KGDD, KZZR

History
- First air date: 1988 (as KZRC)
- Former call signs: KRKX (1983–1988, CP); KZRC (1988–1991); KXYQ (1991–1999); KGUY (1999–2004); KZNY (2004–2006); KSZN (2006–2007); KMUZ (2007–2008)

Technical information
- Licensing authority: FCC
- Facility ID: 68212
- Class: D
- Power: 4,500 watts days only 1,100 watts critical hours

Links
- Public license information: Public file; LMS
- Webcast: Listen Live
- Website: laradiodeportland.com

KOOR (1010 AM "Urbana 1010") is a commercial radio station licensed to Milwaukie, Oregon, and serving the Portland metropolitan area. The station is owned by Bustos Media and the broadcast license is held by Bustos Media Holdings, LLC. It airs a Spanish language rhythmic contemporary radio format.

KOOR is a daytimer station. From dawn to dusk, it is powered at 4,500 watts. But because 1010 AM is a Canadian clear channel frequency, at night it must go off the air to avoid interference. KOOR is permitted to operate at 1,100 watts during critical hours.

== History ==
=== Z-Rock, talk and sports ===
The station was assigned the call letters KRKX on August 22, 1983. On February 28, 1988, the station changed its call sign to KZRC. While having this call sign, it was affiliated with the radio network "Z Rock," which played hard rock and heavy metal music. It stayed with Z Rock for 6 years.

From 1994 to 1999, its call sign was KXYQ. It featured a talk and sports format until mid-1998. At that point, it played classic country for about a year. On August 13, 1999, it changed again to "KGUY" (sports and pop-culture talk), and on March 15, 2004, to KZNY. On May 16, 2006, the call letters became "KSZN" and on January 18, 2007, to "KMUZ". On February 1, 2008, the call sign became the current "KOOR".

In June 2010, owner Bustos Media (through its license-holding subsidiary Bustos Media of Oregon License, LLC) reached an agreement to transfer KOOR and several sister stations to Adelante Media subsidiary Adelante Media of Oregon License, LLC. The FCC approved the deal on September 3, 2010, and the transaction was consummated on September 24, 2010.

=== Russian programming ===
In August 2010, KOOR began airing Russian language programming under the brand "Russian Radio 7". The station previously broadcast a Spanish-language talk radio format branded as "W Radio 1010 AM". It carried talk shows from XEW in Mexico City.

In June 2011, Adelante Media sold KOOR and three Portland area sister stations back to Bustos Media (through its license-holding subsidiary Bustos Media Holdings, LLC) for a combined sale price of $1,260,000. The FCC approved the transfer on August 16, 2011, and the deal was formally consummated on September 30, 2011.

In November 2016, KOOR rebranded in Russian as "Наше Радио USA". However, as of February 2021, the station has reverted to a Spanish hits format, calling itself "Diez-Diez AM" ("Ten-Ten AM"), and imaging with the English phrase, "To The Max!".

=== Spanish rhythmic contemporary ===
On April 5, 2021, KOOR flipped to Spanish rhythmic contemporary hits, including Reggaeton music. It branded as "Urbana", simulcast on KXXP (104.5 FM).

On June 21, 2021, KOOR changed its format from a simulcast of Spanish rhythmic contemporary KXXP 104.5 FM to Spanish sports, branded as "TUDN Deportes 1010". It became a TUDN network affiliate.

In June 2022, former sister station KXXP (now KPLP) was sold by Jackman Holding Company, LLC to Walla Walla University, ending the LMA that Bustos Media was in. Due to this, KOOR shifted back to Spanish rhythmic contemporary.
