= KYCH-FM =

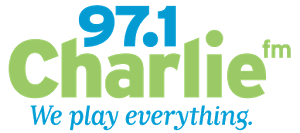
- Portland, Oregon; United States
- Broadcast area: Portland metropolitan area
- Frequency: 97.1 MHz (HD Radio)
- Branding: 97.1 Charlie FM

Programming
- Format: Adult hits

Ownership
- Owner: Audacy, Inc.; (Audacy License, LLC)
- Sister stations: KGON; KMTT; KNRK; KRSK; KRSK-FM; KWJJ-FM

History
- First air date: September 3, 1946; 80 years ago
- Former call signs: KPFM (1946–70); KPAM-FM (1970–80); KCNR-FM (1980–85); KKLI (1985–88); KKSN-FM (1988–2005)
- Former frequencies: 94.9 MHz (1946–47)
- Call sign meaning: "Charlie"

Technical information
- Licensing authority: FCC
- Facility ID: 35034
- Class: C
- ERP: 100,000 watts
- HAAT: 386 meters (1,266 ft)
- Transmitter coordinates: 45°29′19.4″N 122°41′44.3″W

Links
- Public license information: Public file; LMS
- Webcast: Listen live (via Audacy)
- Website: www.audacy.com/charliefm

KYCH-FM (97.1 MHz) is a commercial radio station in Portland, Oregon. It is owned by Audacy, Inc. and airs an adult hits radio format branded as "97.1 Charlie FM". KYCH-FM plays a fairly wide mix of music, mostly from the rock and pop genres, from the 1960s to today; much of the playlist is made up of modern rock and classic rock from the MTV music video era of the 1980s and 1990s. It switches to all Christmas music for several weeks leading to Christmas Day. The station does not have disc jockeys, instead playing amusing or ironic messages after every three or four songs.

KYCH-FM's studios and offices are on SW Bancroft Street in Downtown Portland. The transmitter is atop Portland's West Hills, off SW Fairmount Court. The effective radiated power is 100,000 watts, the maximum for most FM stations.

== History ==
=== KPFM ===
The station signed on the air on September 3, 1946. Its original call sign was KPFM and it broadcast on 94.9 MHz. KPFM was owned by Broadcasters Oregon, Ltd., and had an effective radiated power of 1,530 watts, a fraction of its current output. It was a stand-alone FM station, not affiliated with an AM station, and never had any connection to local television station KPTV. KPFM moved to 97.1 MHz on July 31, 1947, broadcasting a classical music format.

In 1960, KPFM was bought by Chem-Air, Inc., a subsidiary of Boeing, a company known for building aircraft. Chem-Air supplied stores and restaurants with background music, via a subscription radio service not available on regular FM radio. Restaurants and offices would pay for background music not interrupted with commercials.

Chem-Air also put an AM station on the air, KPAM, on 1410 kHz. KPAM was originally a daytimer, required to sign off at sunset; for the first several decades, the two stations simulcast their programming. On December 16, 1961, KPFM became the first station in Oregon to broadcast in FM stereo. KPAM and KPFM were acquired by Romito, Inc. in 1965.

=== K-Pam and K-Lite ===
On February 27, 1970, KPFM changed its call sign to KPAM-FM. KPAM-AM-FM ran a Top 40 format as "K-Pam". In 1980, Duffy Broadcasting acquired KPAM-AM-FM. In September of that year, KPAM-AM-FM changed to KCNR and KCNR-FM, as the "Center" of the FM dial. The two stations aired an adult contemporary format.

Most FM stations in larger cities could not fully simulcast after 1968, but because AM 1410 was a daytimer, the two were permitted to air the same programming most of the time. In 1985, the two stations were sold to different owners, with KCNR-FM being acquired by Fort Vancouver Broadcasting. On November 14, 1985, KCNR-FM changed call letters to KKLI and rebranded as "K-Lite 97 FM", with a soft adult contemporary format.

=== Kissin' Oldies and Charlie FM ===
In 1988, Heritage Media, the owners of KKSN acquired KKLI. On February 5 of that year, KKLI switched its call sign to KKSN-FM, and the following day, changed its format to oldies, simulcasting with the AM, which had been carrying classical music. The two stations called themselves "KISN" as in "Kissin'".

In April 1998, Entercom Communications acquired KKSN-AM-FM. On April 21, 2005, at 2 p.m., after playing "American Pie" by Don McLean, KKSN-FM flipped to the current adult hits format as "Charlie FM". The oldies format moved to exclusively to the AM. The first song on "Charlie" was "Start Me Up" by The Rolling Stones. The callsign was changed to KYCH on April 29, 2005. In 2021, Entercom changed its name to Audacy, Inc.

== HD Radio ==
KYCH broadcasts in the HD Radio format. KYCH-FM-HD2 aired a dance music and classic disco format branded as "Funkytown". The HD2 subchannel has since been turned off.

== See also ==
- List of radio stations in Washington (state)
