= KPDQ (AM) =

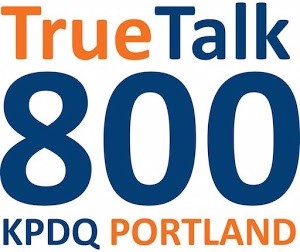
- Portland, Oregon; United States
- Broadcast area: Portland metropolitan area
- Frequency: 800 kHz
- Branding: True Talk 800

Programming
- Format: Christian talk and teaching
- Affiliations: SRN News

Ownership
- Owner: Salem Media Group; (Salem Media of Oregon, Inc.)
- Sister stations: KPAM; KPDQ-FM; KRYP

History
- First air date: July 30, 1947

Technical information
- Licensing authority: FCC
- Facility ID: 58628
- Class: B
- Power: 1,000 watts day; 500 watts night
- Transmitter coordinates: 45°28′38.4″N 122°45′5.3″W
- Translator: 106.3 K292HH (Portland)

Links
- Public license information: Public file; LMS
- Webcast: Listen live
- Website: www.truetalk800.com

KPDQ (800 kHz) is a commercial AM radio station in Portland, Oregon. It is owned by Salem Media Group and serves the Portland metropolitan area, with a Christian talk and teaching radio format known as "True Talk 800". The studios and offices are on SE Lake Road in Milwaukie. KPDQ is co-owned with KPDQ-FM, also a Christian talk and teaching station. Each station runs its own schedule.

By day, KPDQ is powered at 1,000 watts, using a non-directional antenna. But because AM 800 is a Mexican clear channel frequency reserved for XEROK in Ciudad Juarez, KPDQ must reduce power at night to 500 watts to avoid interference. The transmitter is off SW Vermont Street in Beaverton, Oregon. In Portland and adjacent communities, KPDQ programming can also be heard on 99 watt FM translator K292HH, at 106.3 MHz.

== History ==
KPDQ first signed on the air on July 30, 1947. It was owned by George W. Davis, who also served as president. For its first four decades on the air, KPDQ was a daytimer, powered at 1,000 watts but required to go off the air at sunset. The station specialized in religious programming.

In 1961, KPDQ added an FM station, KPDQ-FM, originally at 93.7 MHz. At first, it was a simulcast of KPDQ but began separate religious programming by the end of the 1960s. In the 1980s, Davis' son, George Davis II, became the president of the Inspirational Broadcasting Corporation, the new name for the company that owned both stations.

In August 1986, Inspirational Broadcasting sold KPDQ-AM-FM to Salem Media. Shortly after the purchase, Salem Media got permission from the Federal Communications Commission (FCC) to broadcast around the clock on KPDQ, with reduced nighttime power at 500 watts. Salem also added an FM translator in the mid-2010s, for listeners who prefer FM radio.
