= KRYN =

Radio station in Gresham–Portland, Oregon

- Gresham, Oregon; United States
- Broadcast area: Portland metropolitan area
- Frequency: 1230 kHz
- Branding: La Radio de la Familia

Programming
- Format: Spanish language Christian radio

Ownership
- Owner: Centro Familiar Cristiano

History
- First air date: September 28, 1956; 69 years ago (as KGRO)
- Former call signs: KGRO (1956–1963); KRDR (1963–1988); KKGR (1988–1992); KMUZ (1992–1994); KKBK (1994–1995); KMUZ (1995–2007); KSZN (2007–2009)
- Call sign meaning: La ReYNa (previous format)

Technical information
- Licensing authority: FCC
- Facility ID: 51210
- Class: C
- Power: 920 watts (unlimited)
- Transmitter coordinates: 45°29′03″N 122°24′40″W
- Repeaters: 1390 KZGD (Salem); 1460 KCKX (Stayton)

Links
- Public license information: Public file; LMS

KRYN (1230 AM) is a radio station licensed to Gresham, Oregon, and serving the Portland metropolitan area. The station is owned by Centro Familiar Cristiano and it airs a Spanish language Christian radio format. It is powered at 920 watts, using a non-directional antenna.

== History ==
The station signed on the air on September 28, 1956. The original call sign was KGRO.

The station was assigned the call sign KRYN by the Federal Communications Commission on October 5, 2009. In June 2011, Adelante Media sold KRYN and three Portland, Oregon, area sister stations to Bustos Media (through its license-holding subsidiary Bustos Media Holdings, LLC) for a combined sale price of $1,260,000. The FCC approved the transfer on August 16, 2011, and the deal was formally consummated on September 30, 2011.

Effective February 8, 2019, Bustos Media sold KRYN, two sister stations, and a translator to Centro Familiar Cristiano for $374,500.
