= KRYP =

Radio station in Gladstone, Oregon

- Gladstone, Oregon; United States
- Broadcast area: Portland metropolitan area
- Frequency: 93.1 MHz
- Branding: 93.1 El Rey

Programming
- Language: Spanish
- Format: Regional Mexican

Ownership
- Owner: Salem Media Group; (Salem Media of Oregon, Inc.)
- Sister stations: KPAM; KPDQ; KPDQ-FM

History
- First air date: May 10, 1981
- Former call signs: KAST-FM (1981–1983); KBKN (1983–1984); KAST-FM (1984–2006); KTRO-FM (2006–2007)
- Former frequencies: 92.9 MHz (1981–2006)
- Call sign meaning: El Rey Portland

Technical information
- Licensing authority: FCC
- Facility ID: 82062
- Class: C3
- ERP: 1,600 watts
- HAAT: 387 meters (1,270 ft)
- Transmitter coordinates: 45°29′20″N 122°41′40″W

Links
- Public license information: Public file; LMS
- Webcast: Listen live
- Website: www.931elrey.com

KRYP (93.1 FM, "93.1 El Rey") is a commercial radio station licensed to Gladstone, Oregon, United States, and serving the Portland metropolitan area. Owned by the Salem Media Group, it airs a Spanish-language Regional Mexican format, a mix of genres including Banda, Ranchera, Mariachi, and Norteño music. The studios are on SE Lake Road, off the Milwaukie Expressway (Oregon Route 224) in Portland.

KRYP's transmitter is located atop Portland's West Hills.

== History ==
=== KAST-FM ===
KRYP is a "move-in" station. It signed on the air on May 10, 1981, as KAST-FM, broadcasting on 92.9 MHz in Astoria, Oregon, about 90 miles (140 km) northwest of Portland. It was the FM sister station of KAST 1370 AM, one of Oregon's oldest radio stations. KAST-FM operated at 25,000 watts, but its location and signal strength limited its coverage of the Portland metropolitan area.

In the early 2000s, the decision was made to ask the Federal Communications Commission to allow the station to move. If it could relocate to the Portland metropolitan area, that would be a lucrative change.

=== KTRO ===
KTRO came into existence through a complicated deal that involved five owners of radio stations in Oregon and featured both signal downgrades and frequency migrations. It started in 2005 when Salem Communications bought KAST-FM in Astoria from New Northwest Broadcasters. To make room on the Portland dial, KPDQ-FM, also owned by Salem, moved from 93.7 to 93.9 and downgraded its broadcast station class from C to C1. McKenzie River Broadcasting's KKNU, licensed to Springfield, moved from 93.1 to 93.3. Bay Cities Building's KDCQ, licensed to Coos Bay, moved from 93.5 to 92.9. Meanwhile, Oregon Eagle's KTIL-FM, licensed to Tillamook, moved from 94.1 to 94.3. New Northwest's own 94.3 licensed to Long Beach, Washington, picked up the KAST-FM call sign and format, moving from the original 92.9 to 99.7 FM.

The relocated station began broadcasting in the Portland radio market in early 2006. From that point until April 11, 2007, the station was known as KTRO and it featured a talk radio format. Most of the programming was provided by the Salem Radio Network, a conservative talk service featuring hosts such as Dennis Prager, Hugh Hewitt and Mike Gallagher.

=== KRYP ===
Salem management saw that the Hispanic community was growing in the Portland area. It decided KTRO's talk format could go on an AM station, leaving 93.1 FM to serve Spanish-speaking listeners with a music format targeted at them.

KTRO took on the new call letters KRYP and adopted a new radio format during the two-week period beginning March 28, 2007. The station uses the moniker "El Rey", meaning "The King". Salem Media normally "target[s] audiences interested in Christian and family-themed content and conservative values". But KRYP was an exception. Salem management brought in José Santos of Santos Latin Media to help. He is a former program director of KLVE, one of the top Spanish-language stations in Los Angeles. Santos would lead the station's change to a Regional Mexican format.

The Spring 2008 Arbitron ratings saw KRYP become the Portland radio market leader. It was the first time a Spanish-language radio station achieved that milestone.
