= KMTT =

ESPN Radio affiliate in Vancouver, Washington, United States

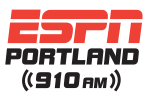
- Vancouver, Washington; United States
- Broadcast area: Willamette Valley; Clark County
- Frequency: 910 kHz
- Branding: 910 ESPN Portland

Programming
- Format: Sports radio
- Affiliations: ESPN Radio; Compass Media Networks; Sports USA Radio Network; Oregon Ducks; Portland Pilots

Ownership
- Owner: Audacy, Inc.; (Audacy License, LLC)
- Sister stations: KGON; KNRK; KRSK; KRSK-FM; KWJJ-FM; KYCH-FM

History
- First air date: April 1, 1980
- Former call signs: KKSN (1980–98); KFXX (1998–2004); KOTK (2004–05); KKSN (2005–07); KTRO (2007–10); KKSN (2010–13)
- Call sign meaning: Former call sign on 103.7 FM in Seattle (now KHTP)

Technical information
- Licensing authority: FCC
- Facility ID: 35033
- Class: B
- Power: 3,300 watts day; 4,300 watts night
- Transmitter coordinates: 45°33′29.4″N 122°29′1.3″W
- Repeater: (105.1-2) KRSK-HD2 (Molalla)

Links
- Public license information: Public file; LMS
- Webcast: Listen live (via Audacy)

KMTT (910 AM) is a commercial radio station licensed to Vancouver, Washington, broadcasting to the Portland, Oregon and Clark County, Washington. KMTT is owned by Audacy, Inc. and airs a sports format with programming from ESPN Radio. The studios are located south of downtown Portland, and the transmitter site is in the city's northeast side along the Columbia River.

== History ==
=== Prior use of 910 kHz in Vancouver ===
The 910 AM frequency was signed on the air in 1939 as KVAN, airing a country music format in the 1950s. After being sold to the Star Stations group in 1959, KVAN began stunting with a loop of "Teenage Bill of Rights" by Robby John and the Seven-Teens for a full day on April 30, 1959, before the station relaunched as a Top 40 station with their call-letters changed to KISN a day later on May 1, 1959, which was at times Portland's most listened-to station in the 1960s. A scandal involving political bias and a litany of indiscretions resulted in the FCC revoking the licenses of all five Star Stations, including KISN, in 1975; the stations left the air on September 2, 1976.

=== New licenses ===
After the FCC revoked the KISN license, four applications were received for the vacated frequency, from Rose Broadcasting, Viking Vancouver, Fort Vancouver Broadcasting and Longwood Broadcasting; the agency designated these applications for comparative hearing on July 12, 1978. The applicants merged in 1979 under the Fort Vancouver Broadcasting application, enabling the FCC to issue a construction permit. The new station took the call letters KKSN—the KISN calls having been assigned to 97.1 FM in Salt Lake City, Utah, on May 8, 1978— and began broadcasting April 1, 1980, trading on the "Mighty 91" name and KISN heritage. Former KISN sales manager Bill Failing served as the first general manager of the new KKSN.

In its history since returning in 1980, this frequency has aired numerous formats, including classical, oldies (as "Kissin' 910 from 1987 to 1989) and adult standards (as "Sunny 910" from 1989 to 1998). On March 30, 1998, as part of a format swap, the "Sunny" format would move to 1520 AM, while 910 became home of sports radio station KFXX, which would move to 1080 kHz on March 18, 2004. 910 then adopted 1080's former hot talk format as KOTK ("Max 910"). Personalities on "Max" included Don Imus, Rick Emerson, Don & Mike, Tom Leykis and Phil Hendrie. On April 21, 2005, it flipped back to oldies as KKSN, picking up the oldies format after KKSN-FM 97.1 ("KISN-FM") flipped to adult hits as "Charlie FM".

On February 15, 2007, KKSN changed their call letters to KTRO; and on March 28, 2007, KTRO-FM changed their format to regional Mexican and changed their call letters to KRYP, and the existing talk format continued on KTRO AM. The station, though still owned by Entercom, was programmed by Salem Communications. The former program lineup (Dennis Prager, Hugh Hewitt, Laura Ingraham, etc.) was similar to that found on other Salem stations throughout the United States.

On January 5, 2009, the station switched to a simulcast of KWJJ, an FM country music station. The LMA with Salem Communications expired.

On May 1, 2009, KTRO switched to ESPN Deportes Radio, a Spanish-language sports talk network.

On May 28, 2010, KTRO changed their call letters back to KKSN. The station dropped ESPN Deportes Radio on July 12, 2010 in favor of simulcasting the programming of KNRK-HD2, which airs music from local bands.

On September 11, 2013, KKSN changed its call letters to KMTT as part of a warehousing move by Entercom. The former holder of the call letters, 103.7 FM in Seattle, now uses the call letters KHTP.

On November 1, 2013, KMTT changed their format from "94/7 too" with local and Northwest music (which continued on KNRK-HD2) to sports, branded as "Sports 910", and featured programming from CBS Sports Radio.

On September 10, 2015, KMTT switched affiliations from CBS Sports Radio to ESPN Radio and rebranded as "910 ESPN Portland".
