= KPDQ-FM =

- Portland, Oregon; United States
- Broadcast area: Portland metropolitan area; Northern Willamette Valley
- Frequency: 93.9 MHz

Programming
- Format: Christian talk and teaching

Ownership
- Owner: Salem Media Group; (Salem Media of Oregon, Inc.)
- Sister stations: KPAM; KPDQ (AM); KRYP

History
- First air date: October 8, 1961 (at 93.7)
- Former frequencies: 93.7 MHz (1961–2006)

Technical information
- Licensing authority: FCC
- Facility ID: 58629
- Class: C1
- ERP: 50,000 watts; 52,000 with beam tilt
- HAAT: 387 meters (1,270 ft)
- Transmitter coordinates: 45°29′20″N 122°41′40″W

Links
- Public license information: Public file; LMS
- Webcast: Listen live
- Website: kpdq.com

KPDQ-FM (93.9 MHz) is a commercial radio station in Portland, Oregon. It is owned by Salem Media Group and serves the Portland metropolitan area, with a Christian talk and teaching radio format. The studios and offices are on SE Lake Road in Milwaukie. KPDQ-FM is co-owned with KPDQ, also a Christian talk and teaching station. Each station runs its own schedule. Among the religious leaders heard on KPDQ-FM are Chuck Swindoll, David Jeremiah, Jim Daly, Tony Evans and John MacArthur. Hosts pay Salem Media for time on the station and may use their broadcasts to appeal for donations to their ministries.

KPDQ-FM has an effective radiated power (ERP) of 50,000 watts (52,000 with beam tilt). The main transmitter is atop Portland's west hills, off SW Fairmount Court. In addition, KPDQ-FM is heard on four FM translator stations, to improve reception in other Oregon communities.

== History ==
=== Early years ===
KPDQ-FM signed on the air on October 8, 1961, originally at 93.7 MHz. At first, it simulcast the same religious programming heard on co-owned KPDQ (AM 800), which originally was a daytimer, required to sign off at sunset. In the 1970s, KPDQ-FM began airing separate religious programming. KPDQ-FM was owned by George W. Davis, who had founded KPDQ in 1947.

In the 1980s, Davis' son, George Davis II, became the president of the Inspirational Broadcasting Corporation, the new name for the company that owned both stations. In August 1986, Inspirational Broadcasting sold KPDQ-AM-FM to Salem Media.

=== Frequency switch ===
In early 2006, KPDQ-FM moved one spot up the dial, to 93.9 MHz. It was part of a multi-station switch, with KAST-FM in Astoria permitted to move into the Portland radio market. That station is now Regional Mexican-formatted KRYP (licensed to Gladstone), also owned by Salem Media.

As part of the move, KPDQ-FM had to downgrade from Class C to Class C1. In addition, it had to cut its 97,000 watt output nearly in half.

== See also ==
- List of radio stations in Washington (state)
