= KGDD (AM) =

Radio station in Oregon City, Oregon

- Oregon City, Oregon; United States
- Broadcast area: Portland, Oregon
- Frequency: 1520 kHz
- Branding: La GranD 93.5

Programming
- Language: Spanish
- Format: Regional Mexican

Ownership
- Owner: Bustos Media; (Bustos Media of Oregon License, LLC)
- Sister stations: KOOR, KZZR

History
- First air date: 1947 (as KGON at 1230)
- Former call signs: KGON (1947–1964); KYMN (1964–1967); KYXI (1967–1984); KSGO (1984–1989); KFXX (1989–1998); KKSN (1998–2003); KZNY (2003–2004); KGDD (2004–2015); KXET (2/4/2015-2/12/2015); KQRR (2015–2022); KXET (2022–2023)
- Former frequencies: 1230 kHz (1947–1956)

Technical information
- Licensing authority: FCC
- Facility ID: 2431
- Class: D
- Power: 5,000 watts day 42 watts night
- Transmitter coordinates: 45°24′44″N 122°34′37″W
- Translator: 93.5 K228EU (Portland)

Links
- Public license information: Public file; LMS
- Webcast: Listen Live
- Website: laradiodeportland.com

KGDD (1520 kHz) is an AM radio station broadcasting a Regional Mexican format. Licensed to Oregon City, Oregon, United States, it serves the Portland, Oregon area. The station is currently owned by Bustos Media of Oregon License, LLC.

== History ==
The station signed on the air on July 4, 1947 as KGON at 1230 kHz. On July 30, 1956, KGON moved to its current 1520 kHz frequency. On August 1, 1964, KGON changed its call sign to KYMN and aired a top 40 format as "Kim Radio". On February 1, 1965, KYMN changed its format to "Good Music" as "Fine Kim Music".

On September 18, 1967, KYMN changed its call sign to KYXI and aired a beautiful music format. In September 1973, KYXI shifted its format to MOR (middle-the-road). On July 12, 1976, KYXI switched to an all-news and talk format as "News 15", with programming from NBC's NIS (News and Information Service), which lasted until May 29, 1977 after which KYXI became a CBS affiliate and continued its all-news/talk format until 1984.

On September 1, 1984, KYXI changed its call sign to KSGO and switched to an oldies format as "Solid Gold Oldies".

On August 18, 1989, KSGO changed its call sign to KFXX and switched to a rock format as "1520 The X". On September 1, 1990, KFXX switched to a sports/talk format as "The Fox". In June 1994, KFXX rebranded as "Sports Radio 1520 The Fan" and added an affiliation with ESPN Radio.

On March 30, 1998, KFXX and its sports format swapped frequencies with adult standards-formatted KKSN 910 AM, with the KKSN call sign and standards format coming to 1520 AM as "Sunny 1520".

On November 17, 2003, KKSN changed its call sign to KZNY, continuing with its "Sunny 1520" adult standards format.

On March 15, 2004, KZNY changed its call sign to KGDD and on April 13, 2004, switched to a regional Mexican format, branded as "La Gran D".

In June 2011, Adelante Media sold KGDD and three Portland, Oregon, area sister stations to Bustos Media (through its license-holding subsidiary Bustos Media Holdings, LLC) for a combined sale price of $1,260,000. The FCC approved the transfer on August 16, 2011, and the deal was formally consummated on September 30, 2011.

On February 4, 2015, KGDD changed its call sign to KXET and changed its format to Russian Christian, swapping formats with KXET 1150 AM Portland, Oregon. On February 12, 2015, KXET changed its call sign to KQRR.

On March 15, 2022, KQRR changed its call sign to KXET. On March 20, 2023, the station changed its call sign back to KGDD.
