= KOLW =

- Basin City, Washington; United States
- Broadcast area: Tri-Cities, Washington
- Frequency: 97.5 MHz
- Branding: 97.5 Kool FM

Programming
- Format: Classic hits

Ownership
- Owner: The Tri Cities Divestiture Trust
- Sister stations: KEYW, KFLD, KONA, KONA-FM, KORD-FM, KXRX, KZHR

History
- First air date: February 1992
- Last air date: January 2024
- Former call signs: KZLO-FM (1988–1989); KZLN-FM (1989–2004); KHTO (2004)
- Call sign meaning: Kool (former name with one O missing) Washington

Technical information
- Licensing authority: FCC
- Facility ID: 51128
- Class: C1
- ERP: 50,000 watts
- HAAT: 189 meters (620 ft)
- Transmitter coordinates: 46°17′22.4″N 119°25′32″W

Links
- Public license information: Public file; LMS
- Webcast: Listen Live
- Website: 975koolfm.com

KOLW (97.5 FM) was a radio station broadcasting a classic hits format branded as "97.5 Kool FM". Licensed to Basin City, Washington, United States, the station served the Tri-Cities area. The station was last owned by The Tri Cities Divestiture Trust, a divesiture trust for Townsquare Media.

== History ==
The station was started by P-N-P Broadcasting, Inc. and was issued a construction permit as a Class A station on 97.7 MHz assigned to Othello in June 1988. The call sign was later changed to KZLO and then to KZLN-FM. The permit was later modified to Class C3 on 97.5 MHz and signed on the air in February 1992. The station was an oldies station affiliated with the Satellite Music Network's "Pure Gold", and identified as "Sizzlin' Hot Oldies 97.5", serving the Columbia Basin. The station was sold to Verl Wheeler of KEYG AM–FM in Grand Coulee in 1996. The station was later sold again, and the city of license was changed to Basin City and upgraded to a Class C1 station. The call letters were changed again on January 14, 2004, to KHTO. On October 31, 2004, KHTO changed call letters to KOLW.

On April 8, 2012, KOLW changed its branding from "Cool 97.5" to "97.5 Kool FM", tweaking its classic hits playlist from the 1960s and the 1970s into the 1970s through the 1980s.

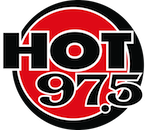
Logo as "Hot 97.5"

On September 19, 2013, at 3:00 p.m., KOLW flipped to rhythmic CHR as "Hot 97.5". The station eventually moved in a more mainstream CHR direction.

On March 1, 2019, KOLW began stunting with construction sounds and riddles in between songs, teasing a relaunch on the following Monday, March 4, at 6 a.m., with the debut of a new morning show. One of the riddles, "Of no use for one, yet absolute bliss to two," was related to 975KissFM.com, a domain discovered by radio industry website RadioInsight in January. The domain previously led to KOLW's former website. At the announced time, the stunting ended and KOLW relaunched as "97.5 Kiss FM", with the syndicated Brooke & Jubal in the Morning as its new morning show.

On June 17, 2022, Townsquare Media placed KOLW into The Tri Cities Divestiture Trust, as part of its acquisition of Cherry Creek Broadcasting. On July 1, 2022, KOLW flipped back to classic hits as "97.5 Kool FM", while the CHR format and "Kiss FM" branding were moved to newly acquired KONA-FM 105.3.

In January 2024, KOLW went silent. The license was surrendered for cancellation that June.
