= Palgrave (surname) =

- Language: English (UK)

Origin
- Word/name: Palgrave, Suffolk
- Popularity: see popular names

Palgrave is a surname. Notable people with the surname include:

- Brian Palgrave (born 1966), English footballer
- Francis Palgrave (1768–1861), British historian, and his sons:
  - Francis Turner Palgrave (1824–1897), British critic, anthologist and poet
  - Gifford Palgrave (1826–1888), British Arabic scholar
  - Inglis Palgrave (1827–1919), British economist
  - Reginald Palgrave (1829–1904), British civil servant
- Olive Coates Palgrave (1889–1963), South African botanical illustrator
- Thomas Palgrave (1642–1726), English politician

== See also ==
- Palgrave (disambiguation)
- John Palsgrave (died 1554), English scholar
