= Radio personality =

Person who has an on-air position in radio broadcasting

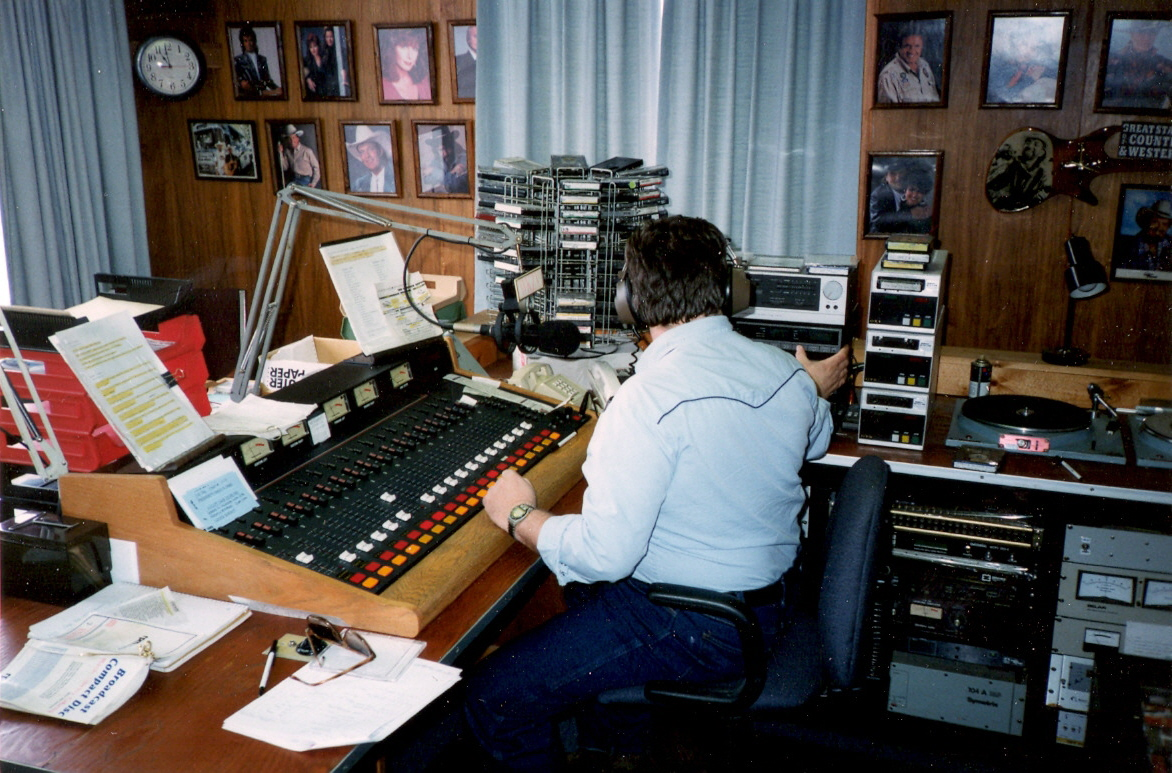
A radio personality (Randy J. Allum) at work at the now-defunct WKZV in Washington, Pennsylvania in 1997

A radio personality is a person who has an on-air position in radio broadcasting. A radio personality who hosts a radio show is also known as a radio host (North American English), radio presenter (British English) or radio jockey. Radio personalities who introduce and play individual selections of recorded music are known as disc jockeys or "DJs" for short. Broadcast radio personalities may include talk radio hosts, AM/FM radio show hosts, and satellite radio program hosts, and non-host contributors to radio programs, such as reporters.

== Description ==
A radio personality can be someone who introduces and discusses genres of music; hosts a talk radio show that may take calls from listeners; interviews celebrities or guests; or gives news, weather, sports, or traffic information. The radio personality may broadcast live or use voice-tracking techniques. Increasingly in the 2010s, radio personalities are expected to supplement their on-air work by posting information online, such as on a blog or on another web forum. This may be either to generate additional revenue or connect with listeners. With the exception of small or rural radio stations, much of music radio broadcasting is done by broadcast automation, a computer-controlled playlist airing MP3 audio files which contain the entire program consisting of music, commercials, and a radio announcer's pre-recorded comments.

== History ==
In the past, the term "disc jockey" (or "DJ") was exclusively used to describe on-air radio personalities who played recorded music and hosted radio shows that featured popular music. Unlike the modern club DJ who uses beatmatching to mix transitions between songs to create continuous play, radio DJs played individual songs or music tracks while voicing announcements, introductions, comments, jokes, and commercials in between each song or short series of songs. During the 1950s, '60s and '70s, radio DJs exerted considerable influence on popular music, especially during the Top 40 radio era, because of their ability to introduce new music to the radio audience and promote or control which songs would be given airplay.

Although radio personalities who specialized in news or talk programs such as Dorothy Kilgallen and Walter Winchell have existed since the early days of radio, exclusive talk radio formats emerged and multiplied in the 1960s, as telephone call in shows, interviews, news, and public affairs became more popular. In New York, WINS (AM) switched to a talk format in 1965, and WCBS (AM) followed two years later. Early talk radio personalities included Bruce Williams and Sally Jesse Raphael. The growth of sports talk radio began in the 1960s, and resulted in the first all-sports station in the US, WFAN (AM) that would go on to feature many sports radio personalities such as Marv Albert and Howie Rose.

== Types of radio personalities ==
- FM/AM radio – AM/FM personalities play music, talk, or both. Some examples are Rick Dees, Elvis Duran, Big Boy, Kidd Kraddick, John Boy and Billy, The Bob and Tom Show, The Breakfast Club, and Rickey Smiley.
- Talk radio – Talk radio personalities often discuss social and political issues from a particular political point of view. Some examples are Rush Limbaugh, Art Bell, George Noory, Brian Lehrer, and Don Geronimo.
- Sports talk radio – Sports talk radio personalities are often former athletes, sports writers, or television anchors and discuss sports news. Some examples are Dan Patrick, Tony Kornheiser, Dan Sileo, Colin Cowherd, and Mike Francesa.
- Satellite radio – Satellite radio personalities are subject to fewer government broadcast regulations and may be allowed to play explicit music. Howard Stern, Opie and Anthony, Dr. Laura, and Chris "Mad Dog" Russo are some of the notable personalities who have successfully made the move from terrestrial radio to satellite radio.
- Internet radio - Internet radio personalities appear on internet radio stations that offer news, sports, talk, and various genres of music that are carried by streaming media outlets such as AccuRadio, Pandora Radio, Slacker Radio and Jango.

== Notable radio personalities ==
Notable radio personalities include pop music radio hosts Wolfman Jack, Jim Pewter, Dick Clark, Casey Kasem, John Peel, Charlie Gillett, Walt Love, Alan Freed, Cousin Brucie, Mamy Baby, Frida Amani, The Real Don Steele, Charlie Tuna, Terry Wogan; sports talk hosts such as Mike Francesa; shock jocks and political talk hosts such as Don Imus, Howard Stern and Rush Limbaugh.

== Career ==
=== Education ===
Many radio personalities do not have a post-high school education, but some do hold degrees in audio engineering. If a radio personality has a degree it is typically a bachelor's degree level qualification in radio-television-film, mass communications, journalism, or English.

=== Training ===
Universities offer classes in radio broadcasting and often have a college radio station, where students can obtain on-the-job training and course credit. Prospective radio personalities can also intern at radio stations for hands-on training from professionals. Training courses are also available online.

=== Requirements ===
A radio personality position generally has the following requirements:

- Good clear voice with excellent tone and modulation
- Great communication skills and creativity to interact with listeners
- Knowledgeable on current affairs, news issues and social trends
- Creative thinking, to be able to think of new ideas or topics for show
- Able to improvise and think "on the spot"
- Ability to develop their own personal style
- A good sense of humor

=== Opportunities ===
Due to radio personalities' vocal training, opportunities to expand their careers often exist. Over time a radio personality could be paid to do voice-overs for commercials, television shows, and movies.

=== Salary in the US ===
Radio personality salaries are influenced by years of experience and education. In 2013, the median salary of a radio personality in the US was $28,400.

- 1–4 years: $15,200–39,400,
- 5–9 years: $20,600–41,700,
- 10–19 years: $23,200–51,200,
- 20 or more years: $26,300–73,000.

A radio personality with a bachelor's degree had a salary range of $19,600–60,400.

The salary of a local radio personality will differ from a national radio personality. National personality pay can be in the millions because of the increased audience size and corporate sponsorship. For example, Rush Limbaugh was reportedly paid $38 million annually as part of the eight-year $400 million contract he signed with Clear Channel Communications.

== Gallery ==
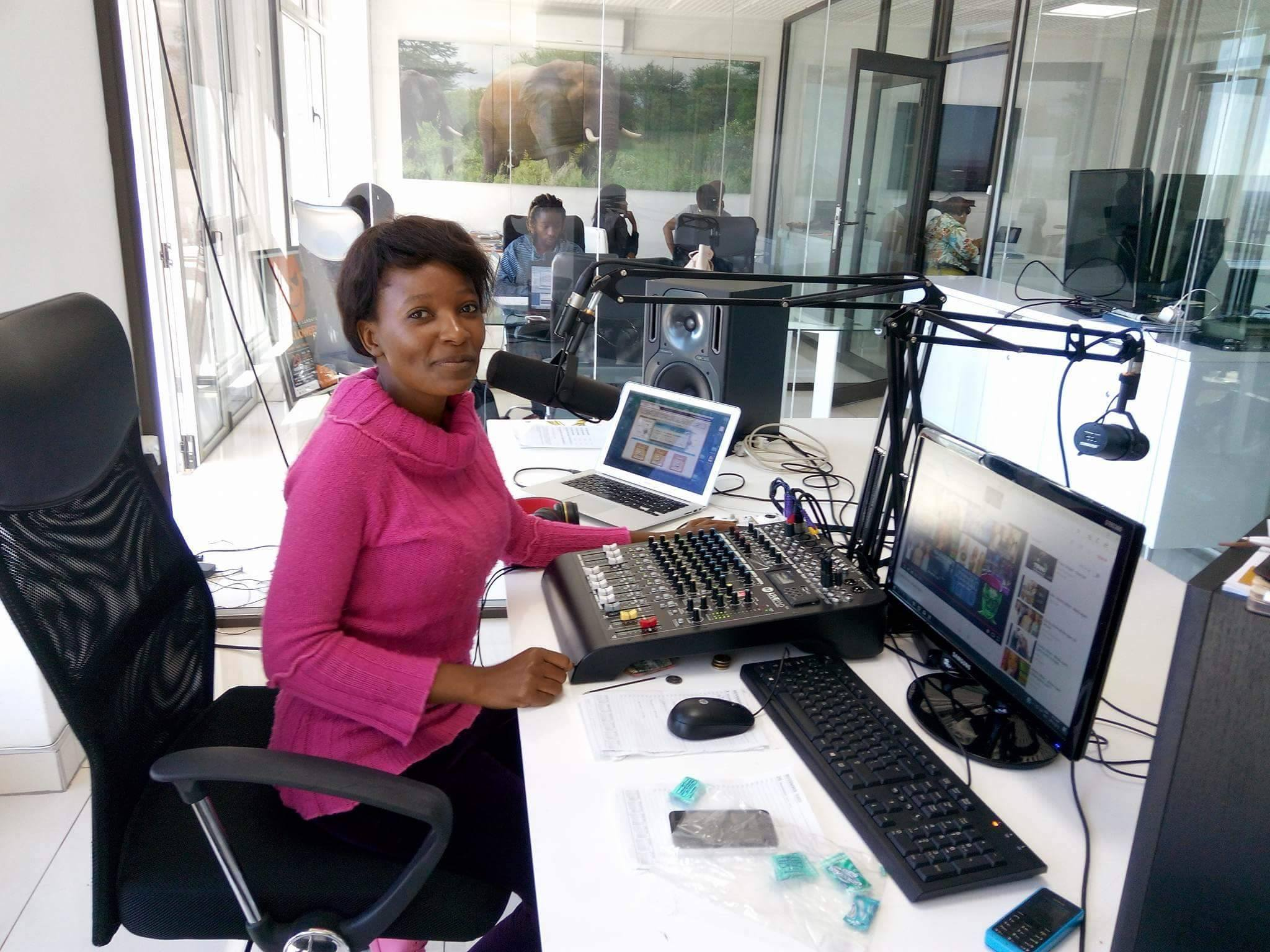
Jessica Letshwiti, ICE100 Radio, Botswana, Southern Africa

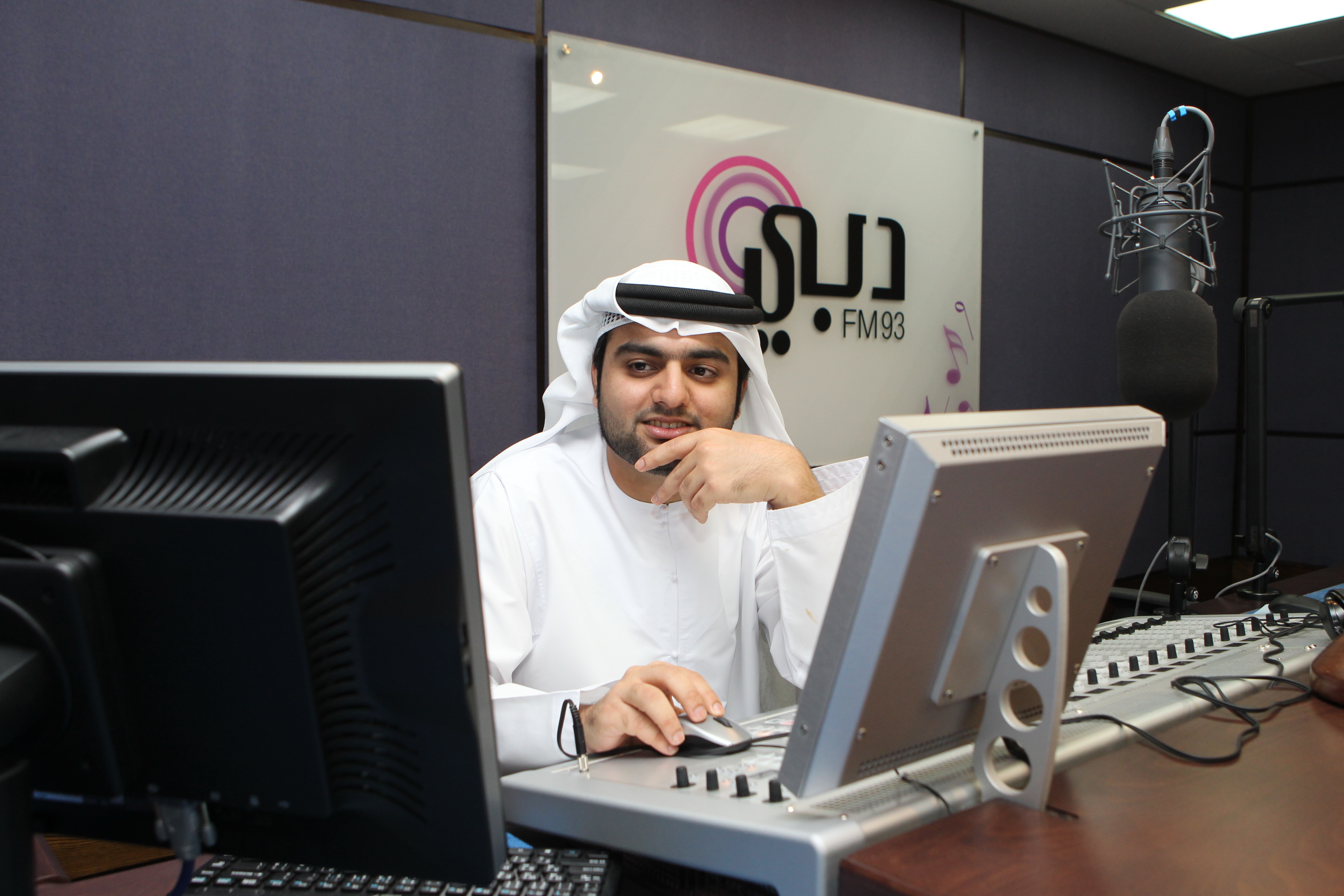
Ibrahim Astady, Dubai 93 FM, United Arab Emirates

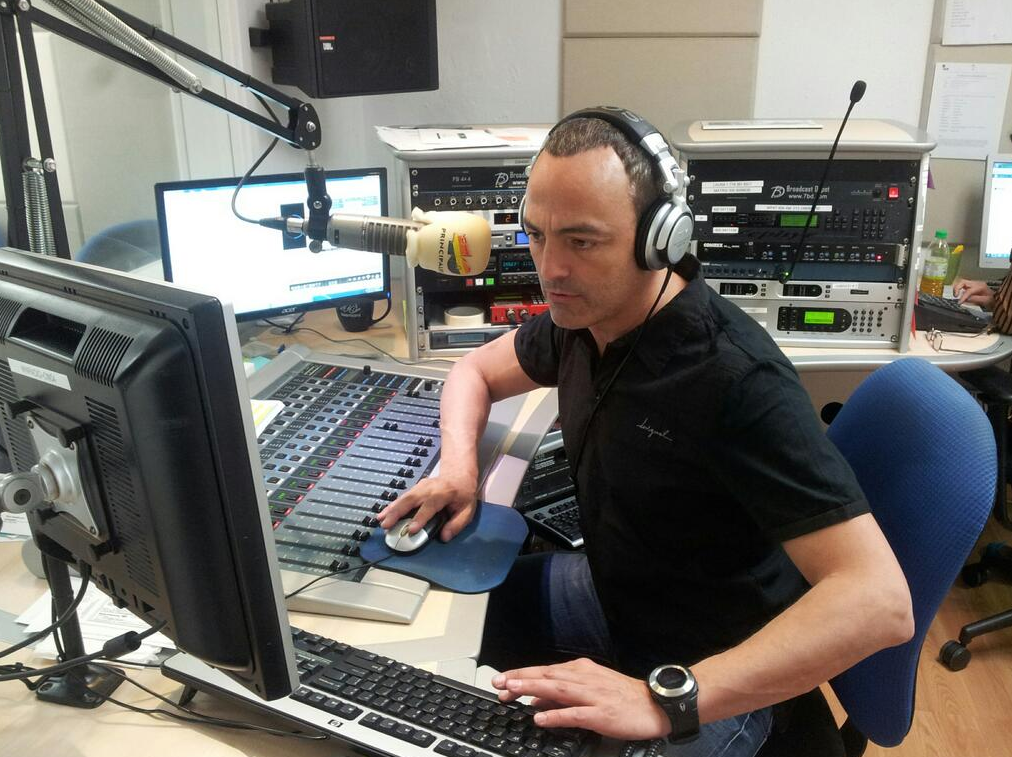
Luis López, director and presenter of the World Dance Music radio program at Los 40 studios in Valencia

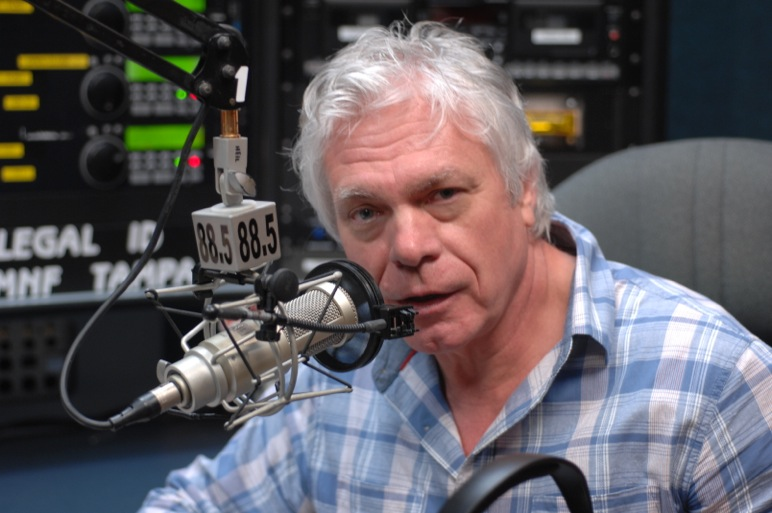
Norman Batley, WMNF, Tampa, FL, 2013

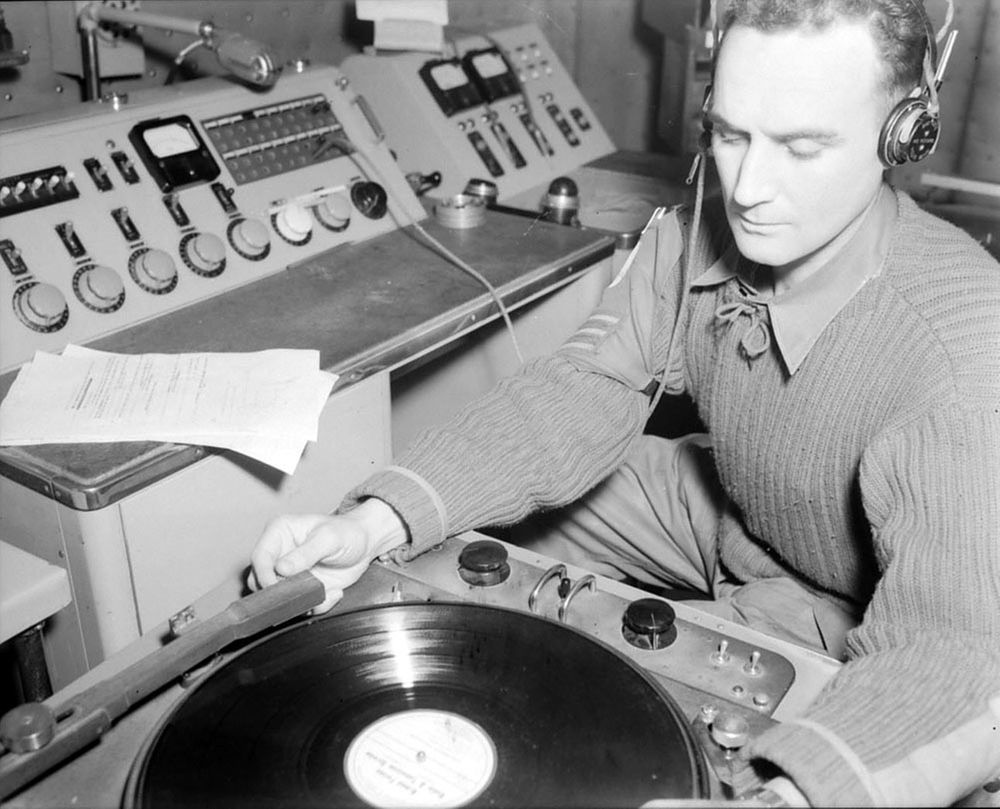
Kevin Joseph O'Donnell, Australian Army station "Radio Commonwealth", Korea 1955

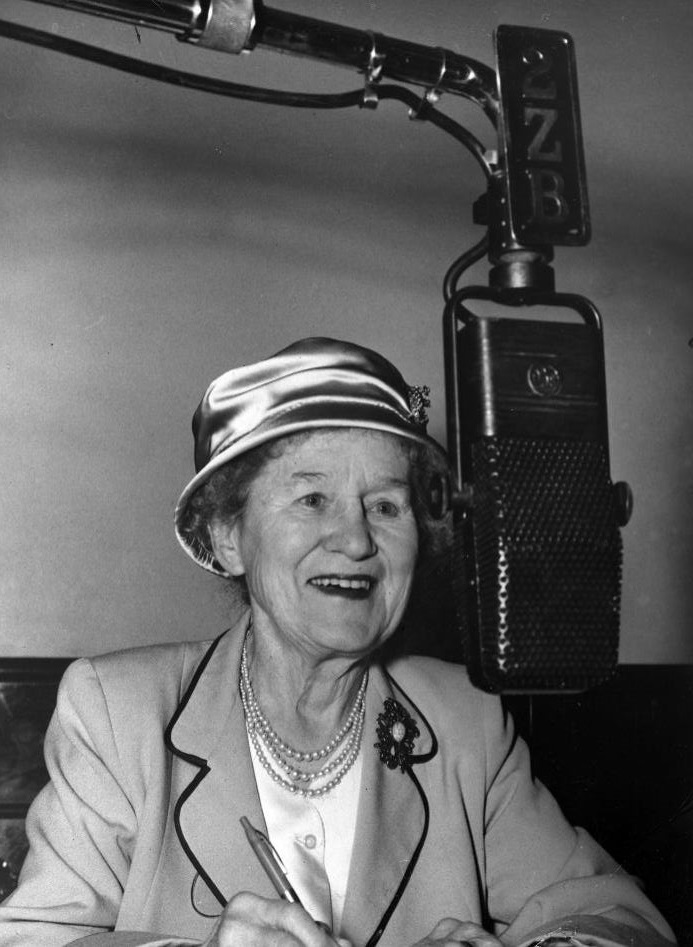
Maud Ruby Bashsam aka "Aunt Daisy" on station 2ZB, Wellington, New Zealand, 1959

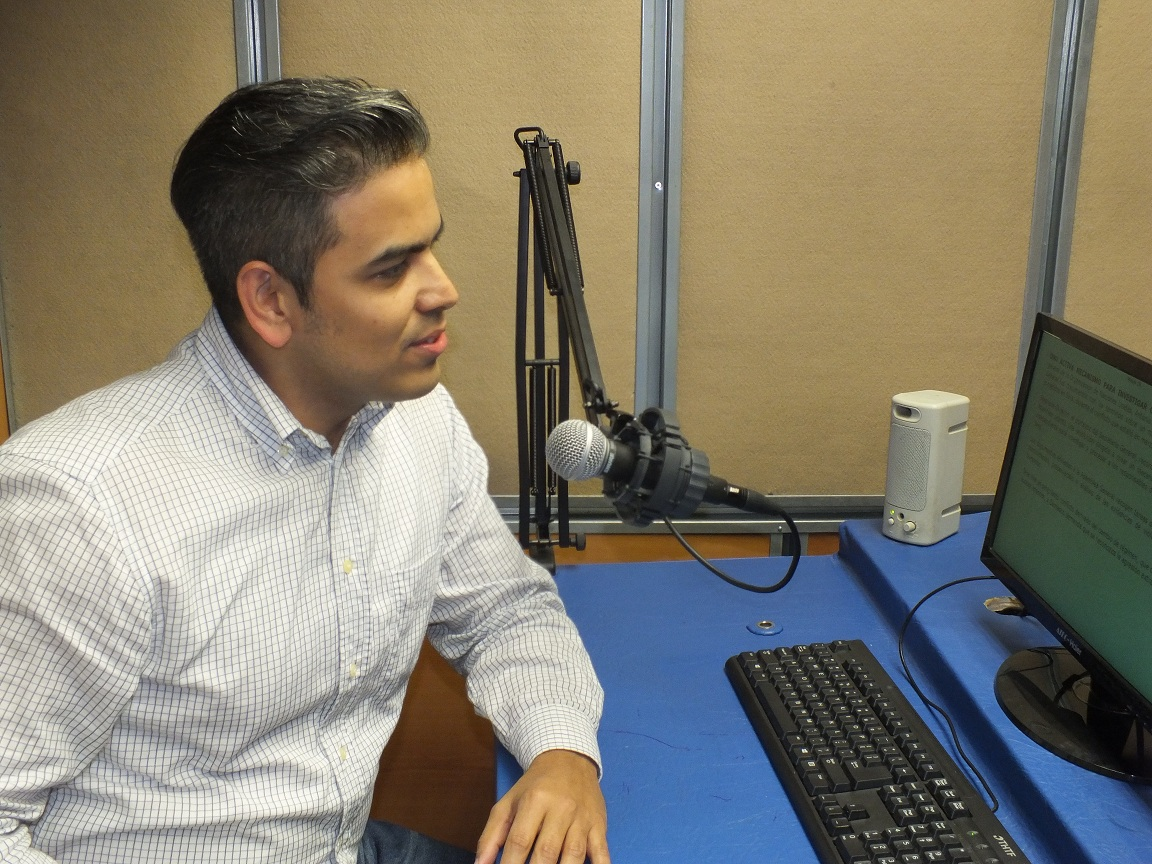
Mauricio Lomonte on station Radio Reloj, Cuba

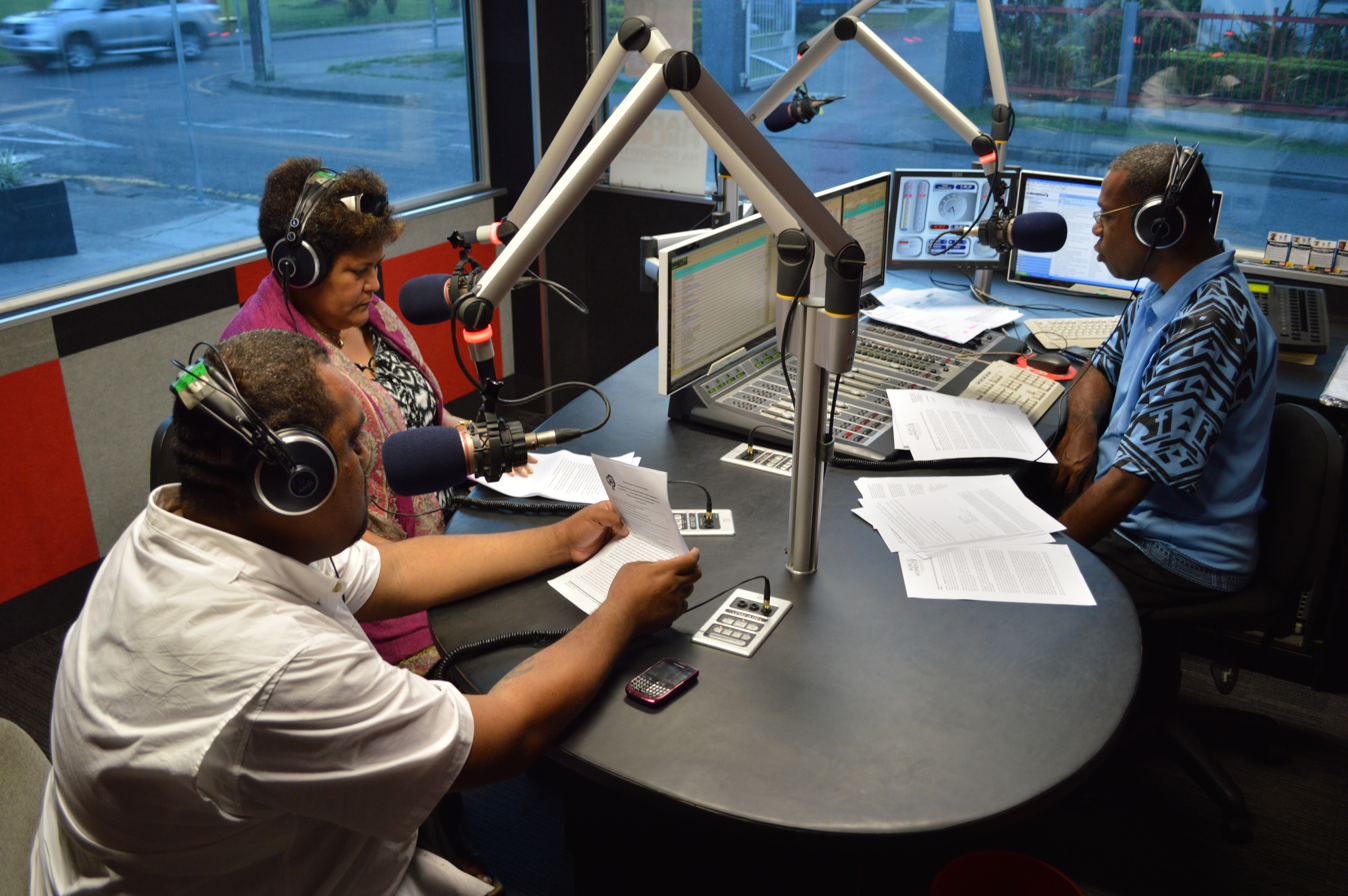
Talk radio host and guests, Radio Fiji One, Fiji Broadcasting Corporation

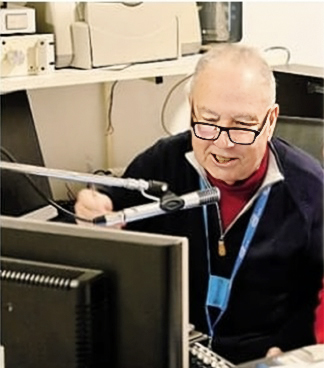
Pino Pagani during Radio Red Zone program, (2020).

== See also ==
- Sports commentator
- Sports radio
- Presenter (disambiguation)
