= KEYG =

KEYG may refer to:

- KEYG (AM), a defunct radio station (1490 AM) licensed to Grand Coulee, Washington, United States
- KLGW, a radio station (98.5 FM) licensed to Grand Coulee, Washington, which held the call sign KEYG-FM from 1985 to 2022
