= KZLN =

KZLN may refer to:

- KVWF, a radio station (100.5 FM) licensed to Augusta, Kansas, United States, which held the call sign KZLN in 2006
- KOLW, a radio station (97.5 FM) licensed to Basin City, Washington, United States, which held the call sign KZLN-FM from 1989 to 2004
- KFXV (TV), a television station (channel 38) licensed to Harlingen, Texas, United States, which held the call sign KZLN until 1984
