= 97 Rock =

97 Rock may refer to the following radio stations:

- KXRX, at 97.1 FM in Pasco, Washington
- WGRF, at 96.9 FM in Buffalo, New York
