= Batley (surname) =

Batley is a surname of English origin. It is likely derived from the town of Batley in West Yorkshire.

Notable people with the surname include:

- Claude Batley (1879–1956), British–Indian architect
- Ernest Batley (1874–1965), British actor and film director
- Ethyle Batley (1876–1917), British actor and filmmaker
- James Batley (1876–1964), British golfer
- Jamie Batley, lacrosse coach
- Joe Batley (born 1996), British rugby player
- Lawrence Batley (1911–2002), British businessman and philanthropist
- Loui Batley (born 1987), British actor
- Noeleen Batley (born 1944), Australian musician
- Norman Batley, radio presenter
- Robert Thompson Batley (1849–1917), British settler in New Zealand

== See also ==
- Battley
