= Battley =

Battley is a surname, and may refer to:

- David Battley (1935–2003), British actor
- Devin Battley (born 1950), American motorcycle racer and businessman
- John Battley (1880–1952), British politician
- Richard Battley (1770–1856), English chemist

== See also ==
- Batley (surname)
