= Clouds FM =

Radio station in Dar es Salaam, Tanzania

- Dar es Salaam; Tanzania

Programming
- Language: Swahili

Ownership
- Owner: Clouds Media Group
- Sister stations: Choice FM, Coconut FM

History
- Founded: December 3, 1999

Links
- Website: cloudsfm.co.tz

Clouds FM is a Swahili-language radio station headquartered in Dar es Salaam, Tanzania, and owned by Clouds Media Group (CMG). It was co-founded by partners and long term friends, Joseph Kusaga and Ruge Mutahaba in 1998 under the then Clouds Entertainment Limited, now CMG.

== History ==
Clouds FM was founded on December 3, 1999, as a transition from Mawingu Disco, an entertainment company that was organizing events and music concerts in Dar es Salaam. It quickly gained popularity due to its support of Bongoflava music genre which at the time was perceived as a music genre for rebel youth. As of September 2023, Clouds FM is available in more than 20 regions in Tanzania.

== Programs ==
Clouds FM airs varieties of entertainment shows along with music programs, mostly Bongoflava and Hip Hop/R&B.

== Notable presenters ==
- Meena Ally
- Mamy Baby
- Millard Ayo
- Kennedy The Remedy
- John Jackson
- Frida Amani
- Adam Mchomvu
- Husna Abdul
- B Dozen
- George Bantu
- Jose Mara
- Masoudy Kipanya
- Geah Habib
- Jose Mara
