= Francis Palgrave =

English historian (1788–1861)

Francis Palgrave KH FRS
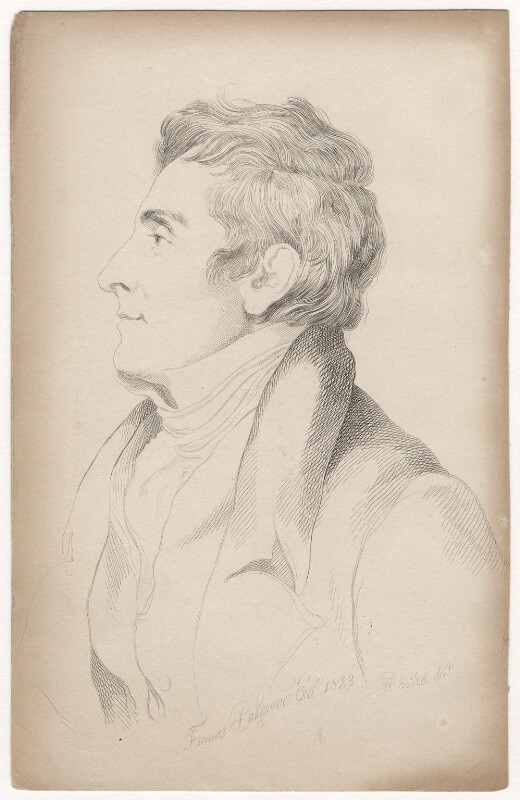
- Born: July 1788; London
- Died: 6 July 1861; London
- Occupations: archivist; historian; author
- Spouse: Elizabeth Turner
- Children: Francis Turner Palgrave, Gifford Palgrave, Reginald Palgrave, Inglis Palgrave
- Parents: Meyer Cohen (father); Rachel Levien (mother)

Sir Francis Palgrave, KH FRS (/ˈpɔːlɡreɪv, ˈpæl-/; born Francis Ephraim Cohen, July 1788 – 6 July 1861) was an English archivist and historian. He was Deputy Keeper (chief executive) of the Public Record Office from its foundation in 1838 until his death; and he is also remembered for his many scholarly publications.

== Early life ==
Francis Cohen was born in London, the son of Meyer Cohen, a Jewish stockbroker (d. 1831) by his wife Rachel Levien Cohen (d. 1815). His maternal grandfather was Gotschal (Eliakim ben Yehuda) Levien, a wealthy merchant who immigrated from Germany and became a leader of the Anglo-Jewish community. Francis was initially articled as a clerk to a London solicitor's firm, and remained there as chief clerk until 1822. His father was financially ruined in 1810 and Francis, the eldest son, became responsible for supporting his parents. Around 1814, Francis Cohen began contributing to the Edinburgh Review; he made the acquaintance of the banker Dawson Turner and his daughter Elizabeth in 1819, offering to correct the proofs of Turner's Architectural Antiquities of Normandy. In 1821, Francis Cohen was admitted to the Fellowship of the Royal Society, one of his sponsors being Turner. Cohen converted to Anglican Christianity before his marriage to Elizabeth Turner on 13 October 1823.

Around the time of his marriage, Cohen also changed his surname to "Palgrave" (his wife's mother's maiden name) by royal licence. It is not clear if either the religious conversion or the name change were conditions of his marriage; however, his father-in-law paid for the expenses of the name change, and settled £3,000 on the couple.

== Career ==
Palgrave was called to the bar in 1827 (after a long period working for solicitors, 1803–1822).

In 1822, he had advocated publishing the national records, and from 1827 he edited several volumes of medieval texts for the Record Commission, including Parliamentary Writs and Writs of Military Summons (2 volumes, 1827 and 1834; including in vol. 2 a text of Nomina Villarum) and Rotuli Curiae Regis: Rolls and Records of the Court held before the King's Justiciars or Justices (2 volumes, 1835). Meanwhile, he was also publishing historical works of his own, including A History of England (1831), The Rise and Progress of the English Commonwealth (1832), An Essay on the Original Authority of the King's Council (1834), Truths and Fictions of the Middle Ages: the Merchant and the Friar (1837) and The History of Normandy and England (1851–64, 4 volumes, of which the last two appeared posthumously).

Palgrave is considered the founder of the Public Record Office. In 1834 he succeeded John Caley as the Keeper of the Records in the chapter house of Westminster Abbey, in which were stored the ancient records of the Exchequer (including Domesday Book), as well as various parliamentary records. From this appointment emerged another important editorial work for the Record Commission, The Ancient Kalendars and Inventories of the Treasury of His Majesty's Exchequer (3 volumes, 1836). In 1838 he was appointed Deputy Keeper of the new Public Record Office, holding that position until his death. In this position, he issued a series of 22 annual reports.

Palgrave was knighted in 1832. In 1834, he was elected a Foreign Honorary Member of the American Academy of Arts and Sciences, and a member of the American Antiquarian Society in 1860.

== Family ==
Palgrave married Elizabeth Turner (1799–1852) on 13 October 1823. She was the daughter of Dawson Turner FRS (1775–1858) and Mary née Palgrave (1775–1858). Her sister Maria Dawson Turner (1797–1872) married Sir William Jackson Hooker FRS (1785–1865).

Francis and Elizabeth Palgrave were the parents of four sons, all distinguished and all authors in their respective fields:

1. Francis Turner Palgrave (1824–1897), poet, anthologist, educationist and bureaucrat, editor of Golden Treasury of English Songs and Lyrics, better known as Palgrave's Golden Treasury
2. (William) Gifford Palgrave (1826–1888 Montevideo, Uruguay), Jesuit priest and missionary turned diplomat, anthropologist and traveller
3. Sir Robert Harry Inglis Palgrave (1827–1919), economist, knighted 1909, author of Palgrave's Dictionary of Political Economy, and editor of Palgrave's Collected Historical Works. He married in 1859 Sarah Maria Brightwen, daughter of George Brightwen.
4. Sir Reginald Francis Douce Palgrave KCB (1829–1904), Clerk of the House of Commons 1886–1902. Married Grace Battley, daughter of Richard Battley, in 1857.

Palgrave's wife predeceased him in August 1852.
