= KONA-FM =

Radio station in Kennewick, Washington, US

- Kennewick, Washington; United States
- Broadcast area: Tri-Cities, Washington
- Frequency: 105.3 MHz
- Branding: 105.3 Kiss FM

Programming
- Format: Top 40 (CHR)
- Affiliations: Compass Media Networks; Premiere Networks

Ownership
- Owner: Townsquare Media; (Townsquare License, LLC)
- Sister stations: KEYW; KFLD; KONA; KORD-FM; KXRX; KZHR

History
- First air date: August 1, 1969
- Former call signs: KEPR-FM (1968–1969)

Technical information
- Licensing authority: FCC
- Facility ID: 67669
- Class: C
- ERP: 100,000 watts
- HAAT: 347 meters (1,138 ft)
- Transmitter coordinates: 46°5′50.4″N 119°11′34″W

Links
- Public license information: Public file; LMS
- Webcast: Listen live
- Website: kissfm1053.com

KONA-FM (105.3 MHz) is a radio station broadcasting a top 40 (CHR) format. Licensed to Kennewick, Washington, United States, the station serves the Tri-Cities area. The station is owned by Townsquare Media and features programming from Compass Media Networks and Premiere Networks.

On June 30, 2022, KONA-FM changed format from hot AC (as "Mix 105.3") to Top 40/CHR as "105.3 Kiss FM" shortly after Townsquare Media completed its acquisition of Cherry Creek Media; the "Kiss FM" format moved from KOLW, which Townsquare was required to divest in the deal.
