= Mamy Baby =

Tanzanian radio presenter and media personality

- Born: Mkuwe Isale; 12 November 1989 (age 36); Tabora
- Spouse: Dr. Hassan Abbas
- Children: 1
- Career
- Show: Clouds FM Top 20
- Station: Clouds FM
- Country: Tanzania

Mkuwe Isale (born November 12, 1989), professionally known as Mamy Baby, is a Tanzanian radio presenter and media personality.

== Early life and education ==
Mkuwe Isale was born on November 12, 1989, in Tabora, Tanzania, into the Fundikira family of the Nyamwezi chiefdom.

Mamy Baby went to Isike Primary School and later attended Kazima Secondary School. Driven by her passion for communication and storytelling, she pursued a higher education in journalism, earning an Advanced Diploma from the Royal College of Journalism.

== Personal life ==
On December 30, 2022, Mamy Baby married Dr. Hassan Abbas, the former Permanent Secretary of the Ministry of Information, Culture, Arts and Sports in Tanzania. Dr. Hassan Abbas currently serves as the Permanent Secretary of the Ministry of Natural Resources and Tourism in Tanzania.

== Career ==
Radio Life

In 2019, Mamy Baby worked at Mambo Jambo (MJ FM), where her career started. Her passion for radio led her to join Radio 5, where she worked from 2011 to 2013. In 2013, she joined East Africa Radio, where she co-hosted The Cruise show, alongside Sam Misago and DJ Sinyorita until 2015.

In 2016, Mamy Baby moved to Clouds FM, where she became part of the team on XXL, the station's top entertainment show. Alongside B Dozen, Adam Mchomvu, and KenedyTheRemedy, she continued to build her reputation as one of the leading voices in Tanzanian entertainment radio.

Political Journey

In 2025, Mkuwe Abdul Issale was nominated to run for a Special Seats Member of Parliament position through the Tanzania Women’s Union (UWT) under the Chama Cha Mapinduzi (CCM) ticket, representing the Tabora Region.

== Impact and influence ==
At Clouds FM, Mamy Baby has played a role in promoting Tanzanian music and culture. Mamy continues to make a difference through DADA HOOD, her initiative dedicated to inspiring and guiding young girls.
