= Palgrave =

Palgrave may refer to:

== Places ==
=== Australia ===
- Palgrave, Queensland, a locality in the Southern Downs Region, Australia

=== Canada ===
- Palgrave, Ontario, Canada

=== United Kingdom ===
- Palgrave, Suffolk, England
- Sporle with Palgrave, Norfolk, England

== Others ==
- Palgrave (surname)
- Palgrave Macmillan, an academic publishing company

== See also ==
- Count palatine
- The New Palgrave: A Dictionary of Economics
- Palgrave's Golden Treasury, a popular anthology of English poetry
