= KORD-FM =

- Richland, Washington; United States
- Broadcast area: Tri-Cities, Washington
- Frequency: 102.7 MHz
- Branding: 102.7 KORD

Programming
- Format: Country music
- Affiliations: Compass Media Networks

Ownership
- Owner: Townsquare Media; (Townsquare License, LLC)
- Sister stations: KEYW, KFLD, KONA, KONA-FM, KXRX, KZHR

History
- First air date: 1989-10-01 (as KZZK-FM)
- Former call signs: KZZK-FM (1980–1989)

Technical information
- Licensing authority: FCC
- Facility ID: 16726
- Class: C
- ERP: 100,000 watts
- HAAT: 404 meters
- Transmitter coordinates: 46°5′47.00″N 119°11′36.00″W

Links
- Public license information: Public file; LMS
- Webcast: Listen live
- Website: 1027kord.com

KORD-FM (102.7 MHz) is a radio station broadcasting a country music format. Licensed to Richland, Washington, United States, the station serves the Tri-Cities area. The station is currently owned by Townsquare Media and features programming from Compass Media Networks. The transmitter is located on Jump Off Joe.

== History ==
The station went on the air in 1965. On October 11, 1989, the station changed its call sign from KZZK, using the on-air moniker KZ103 to the current KORD.

As KZZK 102.7, this station operated a CHR/AC leaning format in the 1980s. Towards the end of that decade, it ceded the CHR market to then-powerhouse KIOK (OK95) and became a country music station.
