= WMNF =

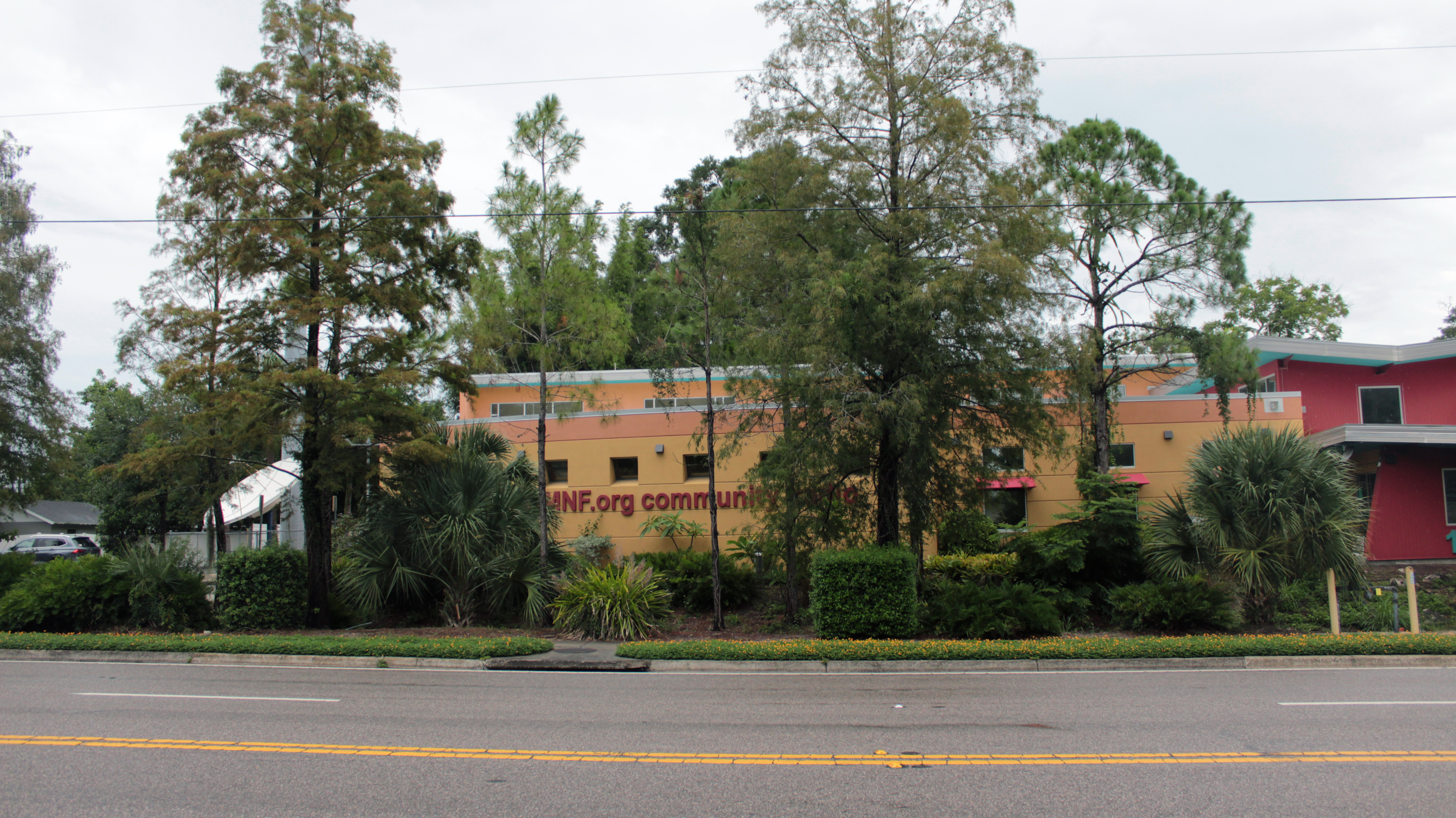
- WMNF station on E Dr. Martin Luther King Jr. Blvd
- Tampa, Florida; United States
- Broadcast area: Tampa Bay
- Frequency: 88.5 MHz (HD Radio)
- Branding: WMNF Listener-Sponsored Community Radio

Programming
- Format: Community Radio; Eclectic Music; Progressive Talk
- Affiliations: Pacifica Radio Network; NPR

Ownership
- Owner: Nathan B. Stubblefield Foundation

History
- First air date: September 14, 1979
- Call sign meaning: Member–supported Non–commercial FM

Technical information
- Licensing authority: FCC
- Facility ID: 47459
- Class: C1
- ERP: 6,650 watts
- HAAT: 469 meters (1,539 ft)
- Transmitter coordinates: 27°49′11.1″N 82°15′38.3″W

Links
- Public license information: Public file; LMS
- Website: www.wmnf.org

WMNF (88.5 FM) is a non-commercial radio station licensed to Tampa, Florida. Owned by the Nathan B. Stubblefield Foundation, it airs a community radio format. WMNF is supported by listener contributions and has studios on East Dr. Martin Luther King Jr. Boulevard in Tampa.

The station's transmitter is off Colonnade Vista Drive in Riverview, Florida.

== Programs and personnel ==
Since its inception, WMNF has had a paid staff, but most of the programming is by volunteers. WMNF has aired a wide variety of music shows, including programs featuring Adult Album Alternative (AAA), Blues, Bluegrass, Folk, Alternative Rock, Rockabilly, R&B, Soul music, Urban Gospel, Celtic music, Jazz, Salsa and Experimental music.

The early WMNF schedule featured Folk and Acoustic music in the morning; Big Band and Nostalgia midday; Jazz Blues and Reggae in the afternoon; and Bluegrass in afternoon drivetime. Gospel, Soul, Jewish, Sixties, Celtic and New Wave filled evenings and the weekend.

In the nineties the station phased out Big Band and Nostalgia and midday became filled with public affairs and talk shows, anchored by the national show Democracy Now and a daily talk show called Radioactivity hosted by News Director Rob Loeei until 2021. WMNF airs several progressive talk and news programs focused on LGBTQ issues, animal and environmental preservation and civil right, hosted mostly by volunteers.

Among the long-running music shows are: The Sixties Show, Gospel Classic Hour, The Soul Party and The Freak Show. Past public affairs programs included RadioActivity and The Women's Show, touching on feminist issues that first started running in the 1980s. Current long running PA shows include Art in Your Ear, Talking Animals, and True Talk, which focuses on the Middle East and the global issues Muslims face.

In 1986, WMNF began the first hip hop show in the area, The Kenny K Wax Attack, which aired on Saturdays at midnight. An Arbitron rating showed 42% of radio listeners under 25 were listening to Kenny K. Saturday late night remains hip hop programming as of May 2024.

In 2014, WMNF added to the schedule, "The Rhythm Revival," hosted by nationally known recording artist/music historian Reverend Billy C. Wirtz. In 2021, Marvelous Marvin, a longtime popular DJ on Tampa Bay commercial radio, joined the show as a cohost. The Friday drive-time high-energy presentation of post WW2 blues, country and gospel is a station highlight.

In 2022, WUSF discontinued evening and overnight jazz programming to the dismay of area jazz fans. WMNF recruited WUSF's longtime former jazz director Bob Seymour to present a Monday evening jazz show on WMNF. Jazz fans have embraced the new show "Jazz in the Night."

== History ==
Before going on the air the station conducted a door to door campaign to raise startup funds. The station signed on the air on September 14, 1979. It was established by the Nathan B. Stubblefield Foundation, a non-profit organization started solely for this purpose. The board of directors comprises programmers, volunteers, staff, and community members. The first WMNF studios were in an old house in south Tampa, moving to a vacated church on Nebraska Avenue in Tampa in 1981.

WMNF was originally powered at 70,000 watts but on a much shorter tower. When its tower tripled in height in 2007, its power was reduced but still with better coverage.

WMNF holds periodic on-air fundraisers and seeks donations and volunteers on its website. Its supporters account for approximately 70% of its funding. There are three pledge drives each year. The station has paid operations staff, but most of the hosts and pledge drive workers are volunteers.

== Facilities ==
In 2005, WMNF moved into new state of the art studios and production space financed by listener donations. The facility is located adjacent to the old studio which was demolished and now serves as a parking lot. The new facility is over 12,000 square feet (1,100 m^{2}) with three broadcast studios, two production studios and a live performance studio named in memory of Mike Eisenstadt, longtime host of the Sunday Simcha, a Jewish music and public affairs show that still airs on Sundays at 2 pm. The music library can store approximately 100,000 CDs, and has about 8,000 record albums.

In 2007, WMNF moved to a higher antenna tower at 469 meters (1539 feet) in height above average terrain (HAAT). The signal stretches from Clearwater and Bradenton to Lakeland and Fort Meade.

== Controversies ==
In 1997, Florida State Senator John Grant zeroed out $104,000 in state funding from the annual budget, citing his displeasure at the lyrics of a song he had heard broadcast (Iris DeMent's "Wasteland of the Free"). In response to the shortfall, the station staged an emergency fundraiser that took in $122,000 in a day and a half. Then Program Director Randy Wynne indicated his belief that such difficulties arose after WMNF aired several criticisms against State Senator Grant's opposition to Olympic gold medalist diver and outspoken LGBTQ activist Greg Louganis attending a speaking engagement at the University of South Florida.

On February 18, 2019, WMNF posted that they ended their "long-running relationship with News Director Rob Lorei" and for more information to "contact General Manager Craig Kopp." Rob Lorei filed a grievance with the station's board of directors. There was a "public outcry" with "some supporters canceled donations" and within the first few days comments from listeners and supporters "poured in at station meetings, and online via WMNF's social media bulletin board".

Josh Holton, former WMNF board member and previous supporter of Craig Kopp wrote that he would no longer support him due to "the completely inappropriate manner in which he has handled this monumentally catastrophic decision, which has hurt our budget, our brand and our reputation."

On March 18, 2019, the board of directors of WMNF posted a statement which said that they would "reinstate Rob to his role as News & Public Affairs Director at WMNF." David Harbeitner (President of the board of directors of WMNF) shared that:

The Board has reached the decision to reinstate Rob to his role as News and Public Affairs director at WMNF. We believe that both Rob and Craig Kopp, the station general manager, can and should play a critical role in the present and future of WMNF. This event, unfortunately, has reinforced the value of WMNF and the impact we have in the local community, particularly in regards to News and Public Affairs. It also has heightened our commitment to support the Tampa Bay community and to give a voice to the under-served."

On April 15, 2019, WMNF's general manager Craig Kopp resigned and noted the community's reaction to the firing and re-hiring of Rob Lorei as a reason, alone with "anti-Semitic and other 'toxic' comments made".

Craig Kopp wrote: "I love WMNF as a concept and have dedicated myself to setting it up to continue far into the future. ... But the reinstatement of Rob Lorei assures that it will remain firmly rooted in the past."

In 2021, a 43-year station veteran named Rob Lorei was terminated by WMNF. Lorei, the public affairs director and show host said he was not given a reason. He told the Tampa Bay Times "No community radio station has been as consistently successful as WMNF. You'll have to ask the general manager why he terminated me." The station told the newspaper that Lorei was given the reason by the general manager and a member of the board and that it would be his choice to disclose the reason. Lorei had been the host of Radioactivity with Rob Lorei, which aired weekdays at 11 am.

Over three months later WMNF stated in a letter that Rob Lorei used an "ethnic slur towards a listener from a station email account." Rob Lorei denied using 'an ethnic slur' and said he used a 'political term' in a reply to a listener who wrote it to "downplay the dangers of the Proud Boys." Will Greaves, WMNF Board President, disagrees and said the term was not a political term but rather "It was an anti-Semitic racial slur that is highly offensive to any Jewish person."

Creative Loafing Tampa Bay reported that opinions on use of the term and its 'hurtfulness' were mixed from the Jewish community. Creative Loafing Tampa Bay wrote that while "most folks agree that it was not the best choice of words ... many in the community do believe that Lorei never meant to use the word in an anti-semitic manner."

Creative Loafing Tampa Bay says they are giving some context by referencing that Rob Lorei, in 1978, snuck into a Ku Klux Klan rally to assess how deep-seated the racism was" and how much of "a threat the KKK was to the Tampa Bay area." and in 1980 Rob Lorei helped "usher in WMNF's first Jewish program ("The Jewish Sound," now known as "The Sunday Simcha")".

== HD channels ==
WMNF broadcasts four HD Radio channels which are also online streams and accessible on the WMNF app.

- HD-1 simulcasts the main WMNF signal.
- HD-2 The Urban Cafe featuring classic soul, R&B, blues, reggae and rap.
- HD-3 The Source, which airs news, public affairs, and arts programming.
- HD-4 Classic Live featuring new Indie music and music shows featuring new releases.

== See also ==
- List of community radio stations in the United States
