= Gifford Palgrave =

British Arabic scholar (1826–1888)

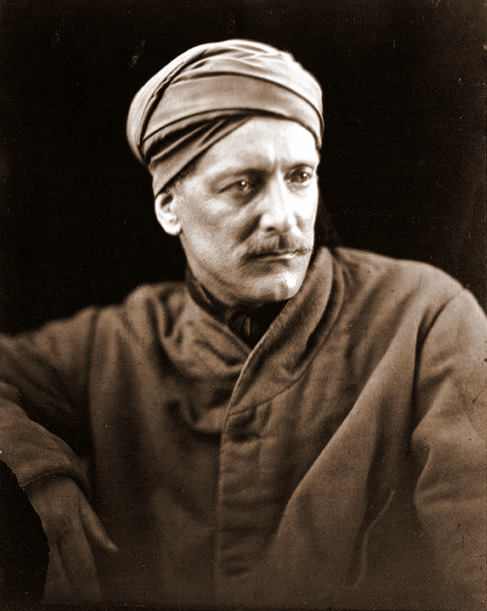
1868 portrait of Palgrave by Julia Margaret Cameron

William Gifford Palgrave (/ˈpælɡreɪv, ˈpɔːl-/; 24 January 1826 – 30 September 1888) was an English priest, soldier, diplomat, traveller, and Arabist.

== Early life and education ==
Palgrave was born in Westminster. He was the son of Sir Francis Palgrave and Elizabeth Turner, daughter of the banker Dawson Turner. His brothers were Francis Turner Palgrave, Inglis Palgrave and Reginald Palgrave. He was educated at Charterhouse School, then occupying its original site near Smithfield, and under the head-mastership of Dr. Saunders, afterwards Dean of Peterborough. Among other honours he won the school gold medal for classical verse, and proceeded to Trinity College, Oxford, where he obtained a scholarship, graduating First Class Lit. Hum., Second Class Math., 1846.

== Early overseas travel and conversion to Catholicism ==
Palgrave went straight from college to India, and served for a time in the 8th Bombay Native Infantry, H.I.C. Shortly after this he became a Roman Catholic, was ordained a priest, joined the order of the Jesuits and served as a member of the order in India, Rome, and in Syria, where he acquired a colloquial command of Arabic.

Palgrave convinced his superiors to support a mission to the interior of Arabia, which at that time was terra incognita to the rest of the world. He also gained the support of the French emperor, Napoleon III, representing to him that better knowledge of Arabia would benefit French imperialistic schemes in Africa and the Middle East.

== Syria and Middle Eastern travels ==
Palgrave then returned to Syria, where he assumed the identity of a travelling Syrian physician. Stocking his bags with medicines and small trade goods, and accompanied by one servant, he set off for Najd, in north-central Arabia. He travelled as a Muslim. The service he would do for the Society of Jesus and the French empire would be as a spy, not a missionary.

Palgrave became friendly with Najdi ruler Faisal bin Turki while in Najd. Faisal's son and heir apparent, Abdullah, asked Palgrave to get him strychnine. Palgrave believed that Abdullah wanted it to poison his father. Palgrave was accused of espionage and was almost executed for his Christian beliefs.

== Later life and death ==
After travelling for a year from Syria, through Najd, and on to Bahrain and Oman, Palgrave returned to Europe, where he wrote a narrative of his travels. This narrative became a bestseller and has been reprinted many times. It makes no mention of the covert motives for his journey.

After writing this book, Palgrave made yet another volte-face and renounced his vocation as a Jesuit priest in 1865. He then entered the British Foreign Office and was appointed consul at Sukhum-Kale (Sukhumi) in 1866, and moved to Trebizond (Trabzon) in 1867. In 1868 he married Katherine, the daughter of George Edward Simpson of Norwich, by whom he had three sons. He was appointed consul at St. Thomas and St. Croix in 1873, Manila in 1876, and in 1878 in newly liberated Principality of Bulgaria, where he was appointed Consul-General. In 1879 he was moved to Bangkok. In 1884 he was appointed Minister Resident and Consul-General to Uruguay, where he served until his death in 1888.

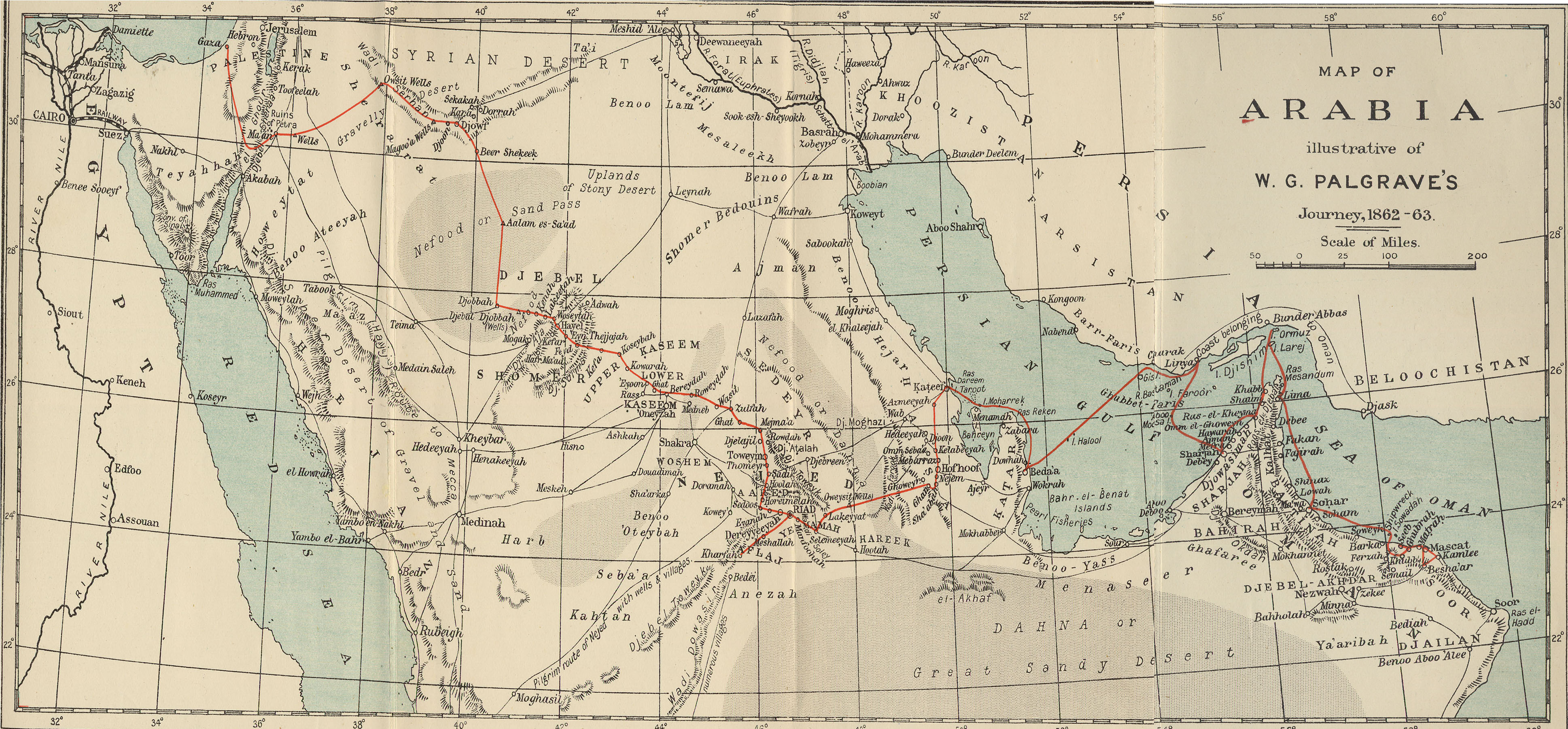
Palgrave's journey marked in red

Besides his work on Central Arabia, Gifford Palgrave published a volume of Essays on Eastern Questions, a narrative called Hermann Agha, a sketch of Dutch Guiana, and a volume of essays titled Ulysses.

Since his death, some have cast doubt on the veracity of his travel accounts. St. John Philby, who retraced many of the routes Palgrave had travelled, suggested he may not have travelled as extensively as he claimed. Noting inaccuracies and discrepancies in his accounts, Philby accuses him of either basing his writing on second-hand accounts of local travellers, or fabricating them altogether.
