= Meena Ally =

Tanzanian presenter

- Born: Zanzibar Island, Tanzania
- Occupations: Actress; TV presenter
- Organization: Clouds Media
- Spouse: Anderson Damas

Meena Ally is a Tanzanian radio and television presenter and actress. She is known for her radio program Niambie, hosted by BBC Media Action, which addresses youth issues and influences engagement of young people in development. She is an advocate for youth and women rights in Tanzania.

== Career ==
Ally worked on an infotainment evening drive show Amplifaya alongside popular media personality and news reporter Millard Ayo, and for a youth entertainment program on Clouds "XXL" in which she managed to reach a young audience and interview various international artists such as Rema, Joe boy, Korede Bello, John Amos from Coming to America, Patoranking, Dj Maphorisa and many Tanzanian A-list artists. She hosts a television show on Clouds TV Washa Kideo which features different Tanzanian artists performing live and live interviews with Ally and co-host Kenedy the Remedy. Ally was also mentioned on The Citizen magazine on the 2021–2021 list of women who influence the digital space.

Ally participated in the Tanzanian entrepreneurship project of empowering women titled "Malkia wa Nguvu", meaning "the powerful struggling Queen", which aims to entice women to self-employment and fight for their rights. Ally was the host of the Bongo Star Search for about four seasons, a popular Tanzanian reality TV singing competition, the latest season (15) ended on 28 February 2025. Ally received positive reviews on her hosting with her fluent spoken languages in English and Swahili since the contestants came not only from Tanzania but also from other eastern African countries including Uganda and Kenya.
