= KZHR =

Radio station in Dayton, Washington, US

- Dayton, Washington; United States
- Broadcast area: Tri-Cities
- Frequency: 92.5 MHz
- Branding: Juan 92.5

Programming
- Language: Spanish
- Format: Adult hits

Ownership
- Owner: Townsquare Media; (Townsquare License, LLC)
- Sister stations: KEYW, KFLD, KONA, KONA-FM, KORD-FM, KXRX

History
- First air date: 1982

Technical information
- Licensing authority: FCC
- Facility ID: 35125
- Class: C1
- ERP: 54,000 watts
- HAAT: 379 meters
- Transmitter coordinates: 45°59′19.00″N 118°10′28.00″W

Links
- Public license information: Public file; LMS
- Webcast: Listen Live
- Website: juan925fm.com

KZHR (92.5 FM) is a radio station broadcasting a Spanish adult hits format. Licensed to Dayton, Washington, United States, the station serves the Tri-Cities and Walla Walla areas. The station is owned by Townsquare Media.

On April 18, 2023, KZHR changed their format from Regional Mexican to Spanish adult hits, branded as "Juan 92.5".
