= KEYW =

- Pasco, Washington; United States
- Broadcast area: Tri-Cities, Washington
- Frequency: 98.3 MHz
- Branding: 98.3 The Key

Programming
- Format: Hot adult contemporary
- Affiliations: Compass Media Networks

Ownership
- Owner: Townsquare Media; (Townsquare License, LLC)
- Sister stations: KFLD, KONA, KONA-FM, KORD-FM, KXRX, KZHR

History
- First air date: June 30, 1986
- Former call signs: KTCW (1984–1986, CP)

Technical information
- Licensing authority: FCC
- Facility ID: 68846
- Class: C1
- ERP: 25,000 watts
- HAAT: 304 meters
- Transmitter coordinates: 46°4′58.00″N 119°9′39.00″W

Links
- Public license information: Public file; LMS
- Webcast: Listen Live
- Website: keyw.com

KEYW (98.3 FM) is a radio station broadcasting a hot adult contemporary format. Licensed to Pasco, Washington, United States, the station serves the Tri-Cities area. The station is currently owned by Townsquare Media.

== History ==
The station was assigned the call letters KTCW on 1984-07-25. On 1986-04-14, the station changed its call sign to the current KEYW.

== Ownership ==
On December 1, 2010 ownership group Townsquare Media announced changes regarding the 98.3 frequency. With the attempted acquisition of former New Northwest broadcast properties in the market, Townsquare would be over the FCC ownership limit in the Tri-Cities. The company would have been forced to divest some properties. These stations to be divested would operate in a divestiture trust until they are sold. The 98.3 frequency would have been moved into this trust.

In July, 2011, the FCC stopped Townsquare Media's plan to buy 12 Tri-City and Yakima radio outlets from New Northwest Broadcasters. According to the July 30, 2011, Tri-City Herald, "An eight-page letter from the FCC to Townsquare released on the agency's website Friday said that proposed use of a divestiture trust was a substantial departure from the kinds of uses previously approved by the commission and dismissed five sets of applications that would have reassigned the radio station licenses."
