= Frida Amani =

Tanzanian rapper

- Born: Frida Amani Bakula
- Origin: Arusha, Tanzania
- Genres: Hip Hop
- Occupations: Musician, Activist, Environmentalist
- Instrument: Vocal
- Years active: 2015-Present

Frida Amani Bakula (born August 4), known professionally as Frida Amani, is a Tanzanian rapper, singer, songwriter, environmentalist, activist, and media personality.

== Early life ==
Frida Amani started her musical journey at the age of 7, where she showcased her talent in church performances. In 2014, she released her debut track “Watasubiri,” garnering attention on local radio stations in Arusha.

== Breakthrough ==
Frida first gained national recognition in 2015 when she participated in the Bongo Star Search competition, finishing in third place. During the competition, her performance of Joh Makini and G Nako's song Nusu Nusu showcased her rap style.

Following her success on Bongo Star Search, Frida took a two-year break from music to pursue a career in broadcasting. She worked as a presenter for East African Radio on the show Planet Bongo and later moved to Clouds Media to present Bongo Flava contents.

== Career ==
Transitioning to broadcasting in 2016, Amani joined Radio 5 Arusha, hosting an entertainment program before moving to East Africa Radio in Dar es Salaam. There, she hosted “The Cruise,” temporarily sidelining her music pursuits. In June 2018, Frida made her comeback to music with the single Jibebe featuring G Boy, a song that reintroduced her in the Tanzanian music scene. Jibebe received extensive airplay across Tanzania, solidifying Amani's status as a prominent rapper and radio personality. Her rap style is known for its simplicity yet depth, as she often writes about her life experiences. She is particularly passionate about advocating for women's rights and inspiring other female rappers.

In 2021, Amani released “Madam President,” a song advocating female empowerment and encouraging young women to aspire for leadership roles, including the presidency. This track led to the rapper being invited to perform at the State House, where she was recognized by the President of Tanzania as the “Madam President” of rap.

Amani's contributions extend beyond music, as she has also made significant strides in environmental activism and advocacy. Her multifaceted career has earned her recognition from major media outlets, leading to her recruitment by Clouds Media, where she currently hosts two programs, “Amplifaya” and “Bongo Fleva,” dedicated to nurturing musical talent in Tanzania.

== Influence and advocacy ==
Frida Amani is also recognized for her advocacy for women in hip-hop. She is recognized for revolutionizing the rap industry in Tanzania, helping to pave the way for more female artists in a male-dominated space. Despite the financial challenges associated with the music industry, Frida remains passionate about rap, viewing it as more than just a source of income.

Her commitment to empowering women through her music and career makes her a significant figure in Tanzanian and East African music.

In May 2024, Frida Amani represented Tanzania at the 6th World Youth Summit in Turkey, organized by TRT WORLD FORUM. The summit brought together young leaders from across the globe, with Africa represented by Tanzania, Somalia, Nigeria, and South Africa. Amani participated in a panel alongside Nigerian comedian Maryam Apaokagi and Palestinian artist Malak Mattar, discussing the role of art and culture in driving societal change. She highlighted how Hip-hop can challenge stereotypes and empower communities, encouraging youth to use their talents for positive impact.

== Personal life ==
Frida Amani grew up admiring rappers such as Lil Wayne, Lauryn Hill, and Albert Mangwea, with Mangwea being one of her most significant influence. She decided to pursue music as her full-time career after high school, despite her family's desire for her to study finance. With her family's support, she was able to follow her dream and make a name for herself in the music industry.

Frida continues to inspire young female rappers in Tanzania and across East Africa, using her platform to uplift women in the entertainment industry.
