= Walt Love =

American radio host

Rev. Walter Shaw, who goes by the on-air nickname Walt "Baby" Love, is a radio host in the United States. Having been in the business for over 35 years, Walt 'Baby' Love hosted three syndicated radio programs, Gospel Traxx, The Countdown and The Urban AC Countdown. All three featured, at Love's insistence, "clean" versions of popular songs.

== Biography ==
Walt has been the host of three uplifting radio programs: The Countdown with Walt "Baby Love" which aired for an unprecedented twenty nine years, from August 1982 thru August 2011; Gospel Traxx for twenty-seven years (and still going strong); and The Urban AC Countdown for fifteen years.

Walt was raised in the small farming community of Creighton, Pennsylvania in East Deer Township. It was in the metropolis of Houston, Texas where he landed his big break at KYOK AM Radio in February 1968. He went on to become the first Black on-air talent at Top 40’s powerhouse KILT radio owned by Lin Broadcasting Company.

Within four years of being in the broadcasting industry, Walt became the first black on-air talent at RKO radio; hosting programs at CKLW in the Canadian city of Windsor, Ontario, and WOR-FM in New York City. During this span of his career, he also held on-air positions at WNBC, WBLS, 99X in New York and was the first Black on-air talent at KHJ, KMPC and KFI in Los Angeles.

In addition to these accomplishments, The Countdown with Walt "Baby” Love has received Billboard Magazine's Best R & B Syndicated Radio Show Award five times, and has become the longest running Urban Syndicated radio show in history. In 2001, Walt won the Stellar Award for Best Gospel Radio Personality; In 2002 he won Radio Personality of the Year from the Black Broadcaster's Alliance. Also in 2002, Gospel Traxx won Best Syndicated Urban/R&B Gospel Show of the Year from Billboard Magazine. For twenty-one years, Walt worked at Radio & Records newspaper as the Urban Radio and Music Editor, while simultaneously hosting his syndicated radio shows.

In June 1997, Walt was ordained in the ministry and is currently an associate minister at First African Methodist Episcopal Church in Los Angeles. In 2005, Walt received his Master of Arts in Theology from Fuller Theological Seminary in Pasadena, California. Walt has also started a Non-Profit Organization entitled The Walt Love Lupus and Cancer Research Foundation, which has been functioning for over twenty years.

In 2007, Walt authored the book "The Gospel According to Reverend Walt "Baby" Love: Inspirations and Meditations from the Gospel Radio Legend" (published by Simon and Schuster).

In 2022, Walt "Baby" Love was inducted into the Radio Hall Of Fame.

Gospel Traxx is currently syndicated within the United States by Reach Media Inc. International syndication is handled by Radio Express.

== See also ==
- Wolfman Jack
- Jim Pewter
- Charlie Tuna
- John Peel
- Charlie Gillett
- R&B
