= Norman B. =

Radio presenter and personality

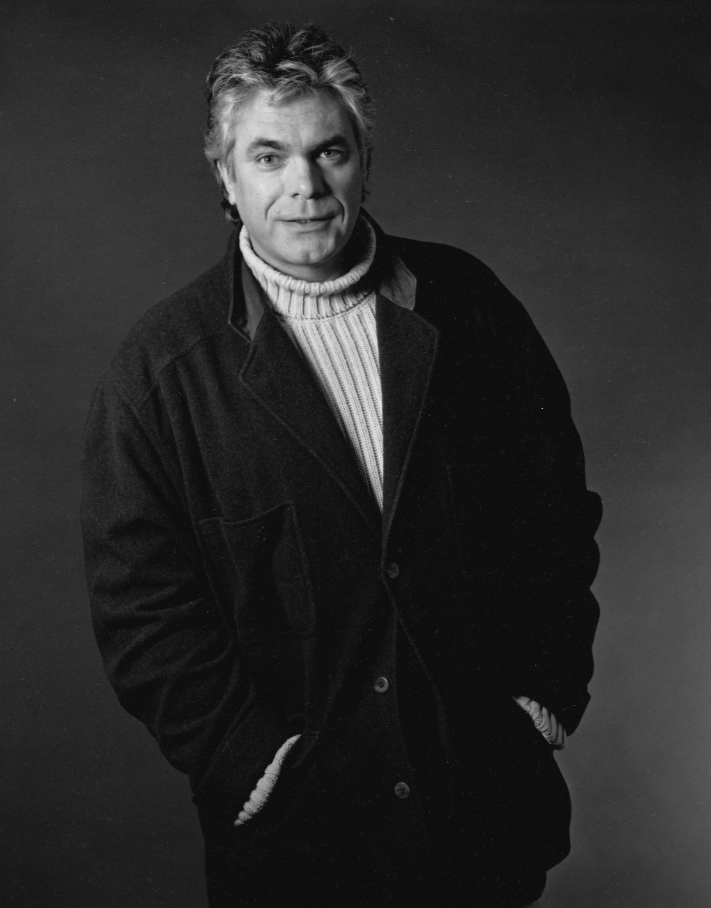
Norman B, radio personality

Norman Batley is a radio personality who has hosted and programmed award-winning shows for stations in the United Kingdom, Seattle, Washington, and Tampa, Florida. He is also a business entrepreneur who has created, managed, and owned successful restaurant concepts in the Tampa Bay area. He produces, writes, edits, and hosts Life Elsewhere, a weekly show about art, media, and culture. The show is broadcast on WMNF. The show is heard on podcast platforms including Spotify, Mixcloud, NPR One, Apple Podcasts.

== Career ==
Norman B.'s career has spanned the worlds of broadcasting, advertising, and hospitality. After studying graphic design and graduating from Richmond College, London, his first position was as a graphic designer for BBC News. He later began working as an art director for EMI Records, working on album covers, publicity, and branding campaigns. He began his own boutique agency, specializing in branding and promotion for the music and fashion industries. A client based in Seattle, Washington, led to an extensive stay in America. An opportunity to be a guest on a local radio show, talking about the new music coming out of the UK. His radio appearance attracted enough interest from listeners and management alike to prompt Norman to explore a regular radio time slot.

Life Elsewhere became a permanent feature on station KCMU (KCMU became KEXP-FM 90.3FM in April 2001), after being a syndicated program being broadcast to multiple college stations.

Life Elsewhere morphed into a weekly show for independent London, UK, station Phoenix Radio. Norman B. launched the reggae show Positive Vibrations for KCMU. The show could be heard on Saturday mornings.

Norman B.’s first foray into commercial radio was in 1984 for an album-oriented rock station KXRX, where he produced and hosted Seattle Blues, a Sunday night show that drew a large following. Bart Becker of The Seattle Weekly wrote that Norman B. was "stirring up the Sunday night radio waves" and "breaking the sound barrier." Following the ratings performance of Seattle Blues, Norman B. was invited to host a midday talk show on KGW in Portland, Oregon, with KXRX management facilitating his travel between the two cities. Prompted by the success of Seattle Blues, KXRX released a new weekly new music show hosted by Norman B. called, The Xtra Hour.

In August 1991, at the peak of Seattle's globally renowned "grunge" music wave, Norman B. was poached by the newly launched alternative radio station 107.7 KNDD The End. Within six weeks of The End's first broadcast, three albums by local artists — "Ten" by Pearl Jam, "Nevermind" by Nirvana, and "Badmotorfinger" by Soundgarden — were released, reaching the top of the Billboard charts, which benefitted KNDD. Within a year KNDD was "defying history," as reported in the Seattle Times. "This spring's Arbitron ratings show KNDD in the top three stations among listeners aged 18–34," writes Times reporter Ken Hunt.

The Seattle Weekly wrote that "In the past six months 'The End' has become one of the hottest stations in the city... leonine Brit and gentleman rocker Norman B makes an amiable afternoon companion."

"I loved all of the DJs," recalls blogger Michael Sutton on the occasion of The End's 20th anniversary. "British iconoclast Norman B., The eclectic mix of music -- was radio at its finest."

By the first part of the 1990s, grunge had made Seattle an important centre for popular music, The End its chief purveyor in the market, and Norman B. that station's highest-profile on-air personality. In 1993 readers of The Seattle Weekly voted Norman B. "Best Radio Voice," edging out Hall of Fame Seattle Mariners broadcaster Dave Niehaus. His "smooth British voice adds class," wrote Elizabethe Brown of the Bellevue Journal American.

In 1997, Norman B. left The End to work for WSJT in Tampa, Florida to anchor that station's format turnaround. "The Norman B. Show," premiered that year with a theme based around Norman B. himself, and soon gained a large following.

== Restaurateur ==
Norman B partnered in a French-Vietnamese bistro, which became one of the most popular establishments in the Tampa area, earning a rating by Conde Nast as one of the "Top 60 Restaurants in the World." Shortly after the launch, the St. Petersburg Times wrote in a review that "high style comes in a tiny boite. French and Vietnamese flavors meet with flair in stunning soups, meat salads and classic entrees. Fresh herbs and flowers are as luxurious as the duck and lobster. Best service of the year."

Norman B. opened three more new eateries, including The Yellow Door, described as a "paradox" by food writer Natalie Capisi of Clique, "that is as visionary as it is rooted in custom, making it an enjoyable puzzle to ponder as you show off your chopstick-ing skills."

"The Yellow Door, my favorite new entry in the Hyde Park dining scene," writes Sara Kennedy of CL Tampa. "The Yellow Door is Restaurant Royalty. It's a fabulously original, creative and consistent restaurant that any foodie would love. I tried a number of dishes, and was astonished at their complexity and sheer exuberance. I nearly dropped my fancy chopsticks in a fit of swooning."

On August 16, 2002, staff writer Michael Canning of the St. Petersburg Times reported that "one of Tampa's most consistently stylish restaurateurs... plans to open a third restaurant. Regulars know to expect stylish decor and natty wait staff. (The Yellow Door) promises a Zen motif with cool colors, natural textures, and 'a very strong emphasis on balance.' Servers may be outfitted in black T-shirts with quotes from Confucius."

"The photos hang in two long rows over the bar, creating a focal point for all who come to relax, celebrate or forget," writes Susan Thurston, Tampa Bay Times. "Each subject holds a drink – wine, beer, even milk. People ask about them constantly."

"Diners may recognize the curved walls and oversized ceiling columns," writes Michael Canning, Tampa Bay Times. "But the rest of the space has been redone in adherence to feng shui principles. Bamboo and cedar surfaces and modern track lighting hold sway in the dining room. Steel mesh curtains partition the lounge, which features a stainless steel bar and Batley's black and white portraits of staff, family and patrons. (Can you spot attorney John Fitzgibbons? Hinks and Elaine Shimberg?)"

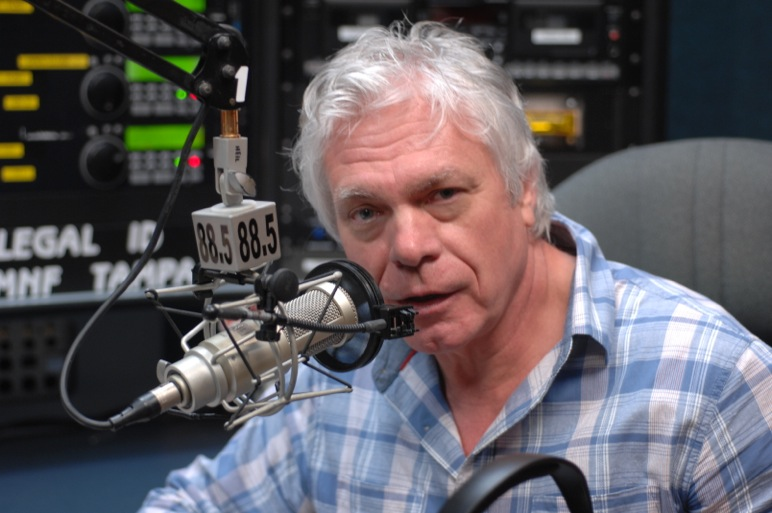
Norman B. in studio at WMNF/Tampa in 2013, hosting "Life Elsewhere."

== Norman B. and 'Life Elsewhere' Return to Radio ==
In February 2013, Norman B. relaunched "Life Elsewhere" as a weekly music, arts and culture program on Tampa Bay public radio station WMNF.

The Tampa Bay Tribune reported the premiere of "Life Elsewhere" as part of a format turnaround at WMNF, with the independent, non-profit station "tweaking the schedule in response to what our listeners have said about what they like and don't like," according to Program Director Randy Wind.

== Nonprofit ==
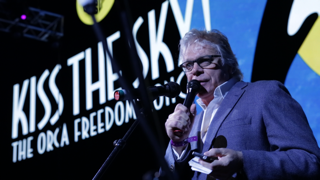
Norman B. performs "Kiss the Sky! The Orca Freedom Concert with Heart, Graham Nash and Joan Jett and the Blackhearts at Seattle's EMP Museum on April 22, 2014.

Norman B. has been actively involved with charitable work and nonprofit organizations throughout his career. Notable events include his performancs work during "KISS THE SKY! The Orca Freedom Concert," a historic Earth Day 2014 benefit show at Seattle's Sky Church at EMP Museum featuring Graham Nash, Heart, Joan Jett and the Blackhearts, Country Joe McDonald, Arielle, and the Andrew Morse Band with Faces and Rolling Stones keyboardist Ian McLagan.

In all, KISS THE SKY! (a reference to Seattle's Jimi Hendrix) showcased four inductees into the Rock and Roll Hall of Fame – or five, given Nash's two HoF inductions, as a founding member of both The Hollies and Crosby, Stills and Nash.

The sellout concert raised tens of thousands of dollars for wild orca research and advocacy. It also provided Norman B. the opportunity to discover that he and McLagan attended the same art school as kids in London.

It would spark a unique oral history collaboration between the two musicologists that lasted until McLagan's passing in the fall of 2014.

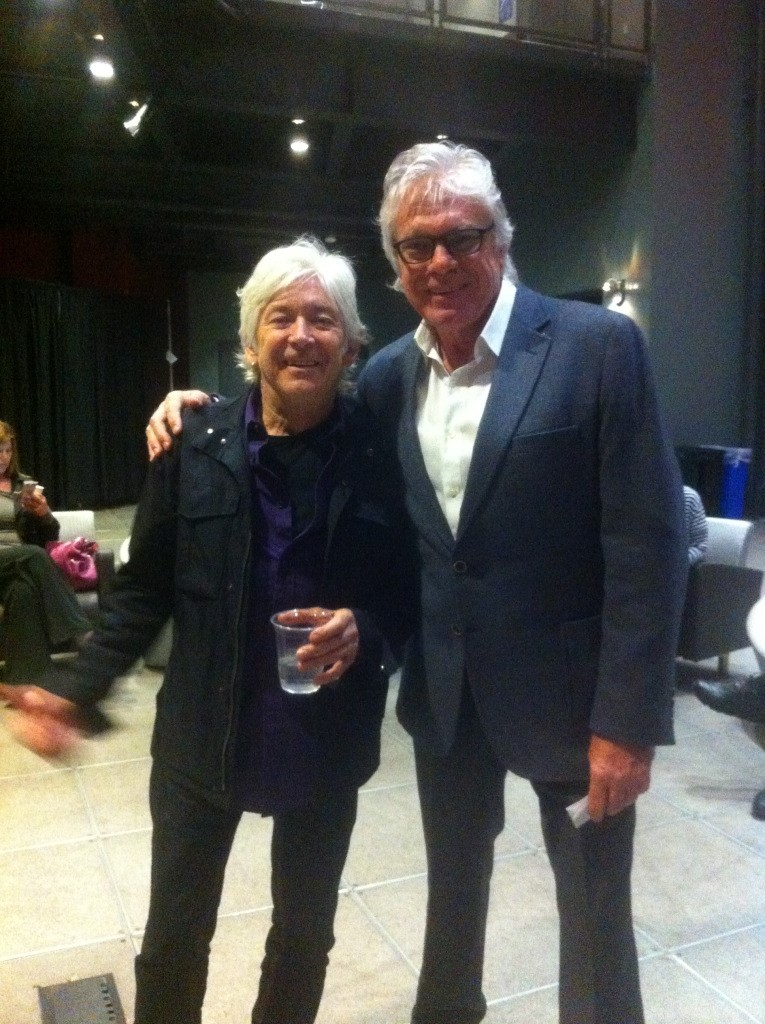
Ian "Mac" McLagan and Norman B. at "KISS THE SKY! The Orca Freedom Concert," Seattle, WA, April 22, 2014.

== Loyal Listeners ==
Norman B. remains one of the most recognized radio personalities in the Pacific Northwest. In a Seattle Post-Intelligencer column, reporter Bill Virgin surveyed readers on "what local hosts or personalities do you miss that you'd like to have back on the air?"

Norman B. was at the top of the list, as by the survey response.

"Think no one cares about an old-fashioned communications medium like radio?," writes Virgin. "Then ask people what they think about it – and see if anyone cares enough to respond. We did ask. They did respond. And it's obvious people do care about radio."

== Radio career ==
KOAS Olympia
Weekly alternative show on campus station that gave birth to Op Magazine and K Records, and helped launch the career of the founder of SubPop Records and numerous musical and artistic talents.
KRAB Seattle
Weekly alternative show "Life Elsewhere" on free-form public station, part of the original Pacifica group.
KXRX Seattle
Hugely popular commercial AOR station; introduced "Seattle Blues" later become an award-winning and long-running brand.
KCMU Seattle (now KEXP)
World-wide acclaimed independent non-commercial station, Norman B hosted Positive Vibrations, a weekly reggae show with highest-rated Arbitron 12+ for the time slot; and produced and also hosted Life Elsewhere an acclaimed weekly alternative show, distributed and heard on over 25 American college stations.
Phoenix Radio London, UK
Weekly overview of alternative American music on an indie station the forerunner of a successful commercial station.
KXRX Seattle
Regular air-shift on the leading Seattle commercial AOR station; winner of "Best Radio Voice" award. Hosted and programmed the weekly show, "Seattle Blues," the longest-running and highest-rated "specialty show" in Seattle radio history. Created and hosted "The Extra Hour", an alternative music show
KGW Portland, OR
Talk show host for the midday time-slot on an enterprising talk-radio station in Oregon.Covering news, social issues and entertaining topics with a vast range of guests, including celebrities, experts and persons of interest, plus interaction with the audience.
KNDD Seattle
Drive-time host for what was to become the nation's most successful alternative station. This was at the start and height of Seattle's "grunge" music phenomena, in which Norman B was actively involved, plus his interviews with the latest talent, celebrities and newsmakers resulted in Arbitron ranking KNDD the leading 12+ station in the country.
WSJT Tampa
Host of "The Norman B. Show," a magazine-style morning drive show for a hybrid AC format, with celebrity and newsmaker interviews, listener telephone calls, scripted sketches, and characters.With a focus on daily topics and current affairs.
Life Elsewhere Radio show and Podcast about Art, Media, and Culture. Interviews with a wide variety of guests, including, authors, musicians, and news pundits. Heard on WMNF, WNRM, Cornucopia Radio and more affiliated stations. Plus the Podcast is available on Spotify NPR One, Apple Podcasts and all the usual platforms.
Life Elsewhere Music A weekly music show focussing on new, rare, unusual music, plus in-depth interviews with notable musicians from David Bowie to upcoming artist's
