= KONA (AM) =

Radio station in Kennewick–Richland–Pasco, Washington

- Kennewick-Richland-Pasco, Washington; United States
- Broadcast area: Tri-Cities, Washington
- Frequency: 610 kHz
- Branding: News Radio 610 KONA

Programming
- Format: News/talk
- Affiliations: ABC News Radio; Compass Media Networks; Premiere Networks; Salem Radio Network; Westwood One; Seattle Seahawks

Ownership
- Owner: Townsquare Media; (Townsquare License, LLC)
- Sister stations: KEYW; KFLD; KONA-FM; KORD-FM; KXRX; KZHR

History
- First air date: February 15, 1949
- Former call signs: KWIE (1948–1957); KEPR (1957–1969)
- Former frequencies: 1230 kHz (1949–1951)

Technical information
- Licensing authority: FCC
- Facility ID: 67668
- Class: B
- Power: 5,000 watts
- Transmitter coordinates: 46°10′26.2″N 119°4′4.2″W

Links
- Public license information: Public file; LMS
- Webcast: Listen live
- Website: 610kona.com

KONA (610 kHz) is a commercial AM radio station licensed to Kennewick-Richland-Pasco, Washington, and serving the Tri-Cities region in Benton, Franklin and Walla Walla Counties. It broadcasts a news/talk format with farm reports, weather and sports. It is owned by Townsquare Media, through subsidiary Townsquare License, LLC, and calls itself "News Radio 610 KONA".

KONA is powered at 5,000 watts. It uses a directional antenna at all times to protect other stations on 610 AM. The transmitter is off East Perkins Road at 2048 PR SE in Richland. The studios and offices are on West Lewis Street in Pasco.

== Programming ==
KONA airs a mix of local and nationally syndicated shows. Weekdays begin with a block of news, information, farm reports and call-in shows. There are also hour-long newscasts at noon and 5pm. National hosts include Armstrong & Getty, Markley, Van Camp & Robbins, Lars Larson, Ben Shapiro, Michael Knowles, Coast to Coast AM with George Noory and This Morning, America's First News with Gordon Deal.

Weekends feature shows on money, health, home repair, law, technology, science, pets, cars and wine. Weekend hosts include Kim Komando, Mike Gallagher, Chris Plante, Science Fantastic with Dr. Michio Kaku, The Pet Show with Warren Eckstein, Bill Handel on the Law and Somewhere in Time with Art Bell. World and national news is provided by ABC News Radio.

== History ==
The station signed on the air on February 15, 1949. It was originally on 1230 kHz and its call sign was KWIE. It was owned by Mid-Columbia Broadcasters and was powered at only 250 watts, a fraction of its current output. In 1951, KWIE was authorized the Federal Communications Commission to move to 610 kHz and boost the power to 1,000 watts; in 1955, the station further increased power to 5,000 watts, allowing it to be heard over the entire the Tri-Cities of Washington.

In 1957, KWIE was acquired by Cascade Broadcasting. Cascade already owned KEPR-TV Channel 19, so the radio station switched its call sign to KEPR to match the TV station. Because the TV station aired CBS television shows, KEPR radio became an affiliate of the CBS Radio Network. In 1967, it added an FM station, KEPR-FM 105.3.

In 1969, the KEPR radio stations split from KEPR-TV, acquired by Tri-Cities Broadcasting. The call signs were switched to KONA and KONA-FM. AM 610 had a middle of the road format of popular music, news and sports, while the FM station played beautiful music. In the 1980s, as music listening switched from AM to FM, KONA gradually reduced the music shows and added more talk programming, until it made the transition to all-talk.

In 2003, KONA and KONA-FM were acquired by CCR-Tri Cities IV. Effective June 17, 2022, Cherry Creek Radio sold KONA as part of a 42 station/21 translator package to Townsquare Media for $18.75 million.
