= Jim Pewter =

American DJ

Jim Pewter is an American radio DJ, songwriter, producer, liner notes author, and an authority about pop, rock, surf music/surf rock, rockabilly, doo wop, oldies, and jazz. Pewter was host of the daily radio program The Jim Pewter Show, heard worldwide on Armed Forces Radio and Television Service for thirty-plus years, and his show was the first music show to be broadcast to American troops serving in Desert Storm.

== Biography ==
A native of St. Paul, Pewter attended the University of Minnesota, where he added guitar playing and songwriting to his list of talents. In 1959, his first hit, "Little Girl", reached the top forty charts in the Mid-West. Jim performed with Fabian, Little Eva, Bobby Comstock and The Trashmen, until graduating from Brown Institute of Radio Electronics in Minneapolis. During two years of service in the army, Pewter was program director and all-night disc jockey of the Munsan-Ni Station of the Armed Forces Korea Network.

In 1973, Pewter co-produced and co-hosted Dick Clark's 20 years of Rock 'N Roll Radio show, syndicated throughout 250 stations. He also wrote and co-produced a four-hour documentary, The Beatles, Their Long and Winding Road, aired in California and later wrote, co-produced and hosted the six-hour radio special Rock and Roll Reunion.

Pewter has written songs for Jan and Dean, Gene Vincent, ('The Story of the Rockers'), Bobby Fuller, Davie Allan and the Arrows, Shakin' Stevens and Dick Dale and the Deltones. He has also produced albums containing past rock, blues and jazz hits for UA, MCA, Capitol, K-Tel, GNP Crescendo and Festival Records.

Because of his musical expertise, Pewter has been busy compiling and producing CDs and writing liner notes for MCA Music Entertainment, Varèse Sarabande Records, Quality, Rhino, and GNP Crescendo. These included The Best of the Surfaris, The Chantays, The Hilltoppers, Surf Party, featuring the Surfaris Live, Surf City's Greatest Hits, Pulp Rock Instros, Better Shred Than Dead – Dick Dale Anthology. Hot Rods and Custom Classics-Boxset, Del-Fi Girl Groups, and Endless Sleep – The Best of Jody Reynolds.

Pewter was Research Consultant for the Columbia movie La Bamba (the story of Ritchie Valens), was consultant for the live Rock 'N Roll Revival shows in NYC and was also heard weekends over WPIX-FM in New York City, via tape.

Pewter hosted an oldies rock show on KMET in Los Angeles, prior to becoming program director of K-EARTH in 1973 and P.D. of KRLA in 1983.

From 1988 to 1991, Pewter hosted a morning radio show for FM Yokohama in Japan which featured: American pop hits from the 1950s, '60s and '70s; and interviews with various pop-rock personalities. His radio specials in national syndication are: The Beach Boys Story, The Legend of Buddy Holly, The Frankie Valli Story and Ricky Nelson ... Teenage Idol.

Pewter resides in Port Hueneme, California. His hobbies include a record collection of over 20,000 singles and albums. Judy Pewter, Jim's wife of 38 years, died in November 2007. In the 1960s, Judy was manager of KRLA Beat magazine and, later, publicity director for Century City Records in Los Angeles.

== Discography ==
=== Singles ===
- "Ebony" / "Lindu Lu" (1972)
- "Little Miss Red Riding Hood Surfer Queen Of Hollywood" / "Bop-A-Rock" (1973)

=== Albums ===
- The Early Years 1959-1973 (1976)

== See also ==
- Wolfman Jack
- Walt Love
- Charlie Tuna
- John Peel
- Charlie Gillett
- R&B
