= KFLD =

- Pasco, Washington; United States
- Broadcast area: Tri-Cities, Washington
- Frequency: 870 kHz
- Branding: Newstalk 870 AM 98.7 FM

Programming
- Format: News/talk
- Affiliations: Fox News Radio; Compass Media Networks; Salem Radio Network; Westwood One; Tri-City Americans

Ownership
- Owner: Townsquare Media; (Townsquare License, LLC)
- Sister stations: KEYW, KONA, KONA-FM, KORD-FM, KXRX, KZHR

History
- First air date: July 28, 1956 (as KORD)
- Former call signs: KORD (1956–1995)

Technical information
- Licensing authority: FCC
- Facility ID: 16725
- Class: B
- Power: 10,000 watts day 250 watts night
- Transmitter coordinates: 46°13′41.00″N 119°7′32.00″W
- Translator: 98.7 K254DP (Pasco)

Links
- Public license information: Public file; LMS
- Webcast: Listen Live
- Website: newstalk870.am

Former logo

KFLD (870 AM) is a radio station broadcasting a news/talk format. Licensed to Pasco, Washington, United States, the station serves the Tri-Cities area.

== Overview ==
870 AM is a United States clear-channel frequency, on which WWL in New Orleans is the dominant Class A station. All other stations, besides WWL, must either reduce power or leave the air during the period from sunset to sunrise in order to protect the nighttime skywave signal of WWL.

== Ownership ==
The station is currently owned by Townsquare Media and features programming from Fox News Radio, Compass Media Networks, Salem Radio Network, and Westwood One.
