= Francis Turner Palgrave =

British critic, anthologist and poet (1824–1897)

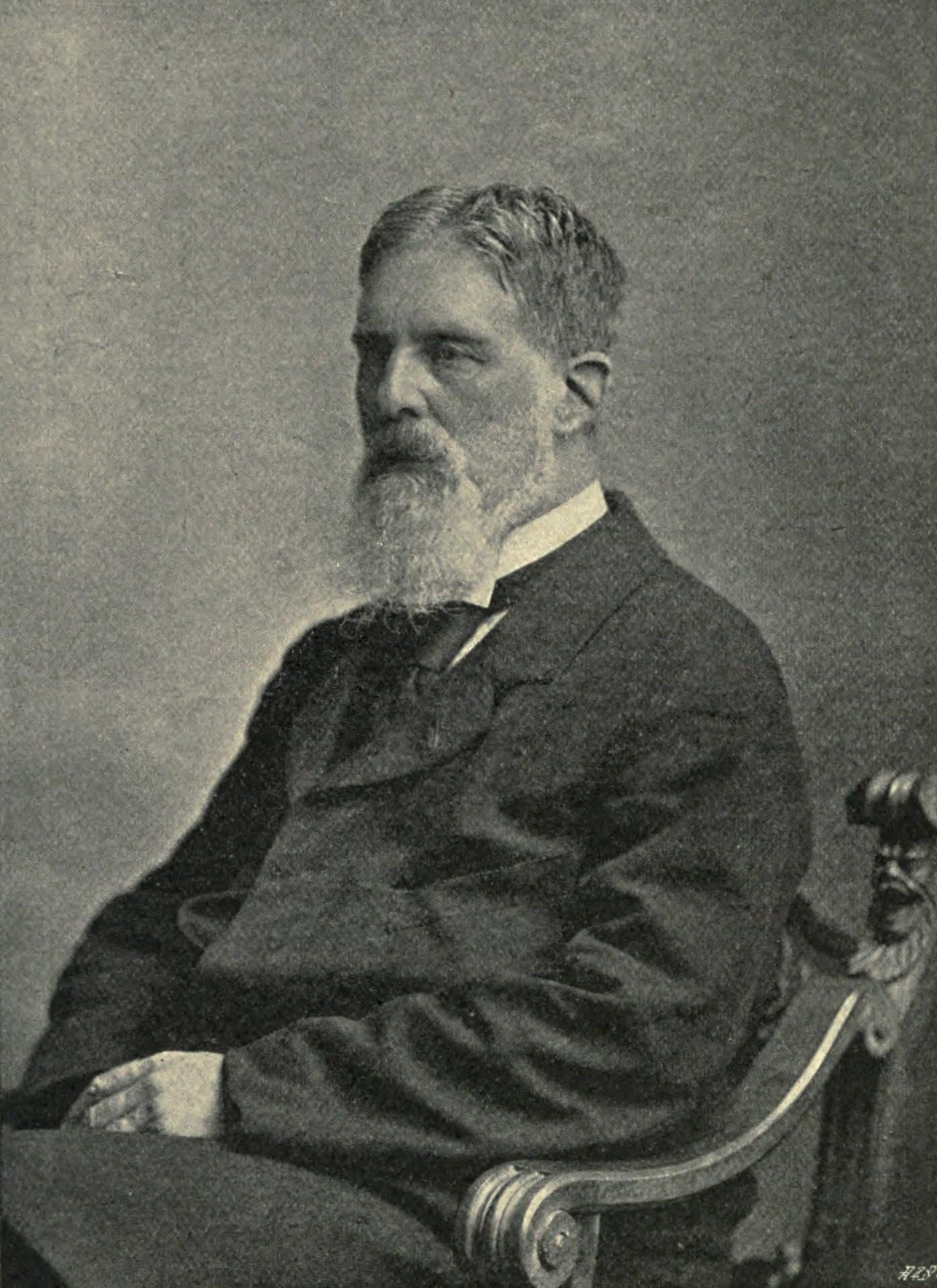
Palgrave, by Elliott & Fry.

Francis Turner Palgrave (/ˈpɔːlɡreɪv, ˈpæl-/; 28 September 1824 – 24 October 1897) was a British critic, anthologist and poet.

== Life ==
He was born at Great Yarmouth, the eldest son of Sir Francis Palgrave, the (born Jewish) historian to his wife Elizabeth, daughter of the banker Dawson Turner. His brothers were William Gifford Palgrave, Robert Harry Inglis Palgrave and Reginald Palgrave. His childhood was spent at Yarmouth and at his father's house in Hampstead. At fourteen he was sent as a day-boy to Charterhouse; and in 1843, having in the meanwhile travelled extensively in Italy and other parts of the continent, he won a scholarship at Balliol College, Oxford. In 1846 he interrupted his university career to serve as assistant private secretary to Gladstone, but returned, to Oxford the next year, and took a first class in Literae Humaniores. From 1847 to 1862 he was fellow of Exeter College, and in 1849 entered the Education Department at Whitehall.

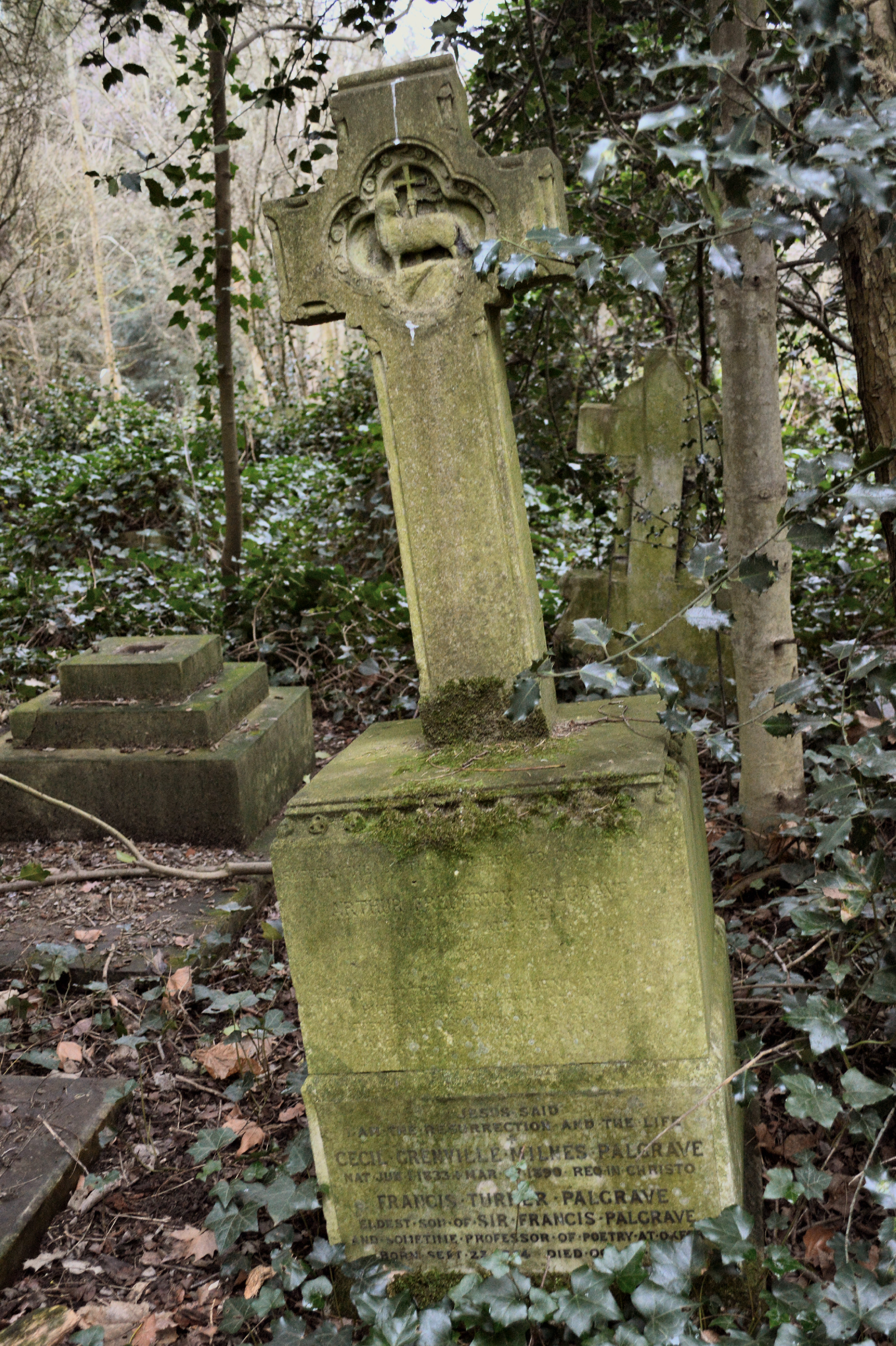
Barnes Old Cemetery

In 1850 Palgrave accepted the vice-principalship of Kneller Hall Training College at Twickenham. The Principal of the College was Frederick Temple, a friend from his Oxford days. There he also came into contact with Alfred Tennyson, with whom he laid the foundation of another lifelong friendship. When the training college was abandoned, Palgrave returned to Whitehall in 1855, becoming examiner in the Education Department, and eventually assistant secretary.

He lived at the Hampstead home with his widowed father until on 30 December 1862, he married Cecil Grenville Milnes, daughter of James Milnes-Gaskell, MP for Much Wenlock and a friend of Gladstone. Temple, the Gladstones, who invited the couple to Hawarden Castle, and Tennyson were among the liberal-minded guests who attended the wedding. When they visited Hawarden again, her father had died, and Gladstone lost a good friend, for Cis accompanied her husband everywhere; to Aldworth and Farringford, Tennyson's houses, and to the Grosvenor family at the Duke of Westminster's house. Yet one of his greatest friends was Charles Alderson, with whose family he travelled to Grenoble, and whose familial Norfolk connections included the aesthete and doyenne, Lady Eastlake. Palgrave's flirtation with Liberalism came to an abrupt halt, when in 1885, he diverged with Gladstone over the Home Rule debate. While they lived at 5 York Gate, a mansion located in Regents Park, they took a holiday home, called Little Park, in 'Royalist' Lyme Regis, with a more Conservative inference; it belonged to his parents. Throughout 1870s the Palgraves paid repeated visits and stays at Hatfield House, the home of the future Conservative Prime Minister, Lord and Lady Salisbury. He was hugely impressed by the artistic beauty of the mansion, its objets d'arts, fine art, and furniture being of national significance.

Palgrave continued to work in the Privy Council's Education Department until he resigned his position in 1884, and in the following year succeeded John Campbell Shairp as professor of poetry at Oxford. For many years F. T. Palgrave remained the art critic for the popular Saturday Review. There was a minor scandal when he was commissioned to write a catalogue for the 1862 International Exhibition, in which he praised his friend the sculptor Thomas Woolner while simultaneously denigrating others, especially Woolner's main rival Carlo Marochetti. The well known controversialist Jacob Omnium pointed out in a series of letters to the press that the two lived together. William Holman Hunt wrote a reply supporting Palgrave and Woolner, but Palgrave was forced to withdraw the catalogue. He died in London, and was buried in the cemetery on Barnes Common.

His only child, Gwenllian Florence Palgrave (1867-1941), published a biography of her father's life in 1899.

== Poet/critic ==
Palgrave published both criticism and poetry, but his work as a critic was by far the more important. His Visions of England (1880–1881) has dignity and lucidity, but little of the "natural magic" which the greatest of his predecessors in the Oxford chair considered to be the test of inspiration. His last volume of poetry, Amenophis, appeared in 1892. His criticism is considered to demonstrate fine and sensitive tact, quick intuitive perception, and generally sound judgment. His Descriptive Handbook to the Fine Art Collections in the International Exhibition of 1862, and his Essays on Art (1866), though flawed, were full of striking judgments strikingly expressed. Nonetheless the critic John Ruskin wrote in 1855 on his History of Painting, "I think it is a most valuable contribution." Palgrave was immediately encouraged to write History of Engraving which was completed in quick time, and hailed as a masterpiece.

His Landscape in Poetry (1897) showed wide knowledge and critical appreciation of one of the most attractive aspects of poetic interpretation. But Palgrave's principal contribution to the development of literary taste was contained in his Golden Treasury of English Songs and Lyrics (1861), an anthology of the best poetry in the language constructed upon a plan sound and spacious, and followed out with a delicacy of feeling which could scarcely be surpassed. Palgrave followed it with a Treasury of Sacred Song (1889), and a second series of the Golden Treasury (1897), including the work of later poets, but in neither of these was quite the same exquisiteness of judgment preserved. Among his other works were The Passionate Pilgrim (1858), a volume of selections from Robert Herrick entitled Chrysomela (1877), a memoir of Arthur Hugh Clough (1862) and a critical essay on Sir Walter Scott (1866) as a preface to an edition of his poems. He published a small collection of hymns in 1867 which ran to three editions, each slightly enlarged. Palgrave was also a hymn-writer using the words, on one occasion, the Elizabethan version of 120th Psalm "O Thou not made with hands" into a hymn. The highly poetical "Little Child's Hymn" held great sentimental meaning for his daughter and biographer Gwenllian.
