= Inglis Palgrave =

British economist (1827–1919)

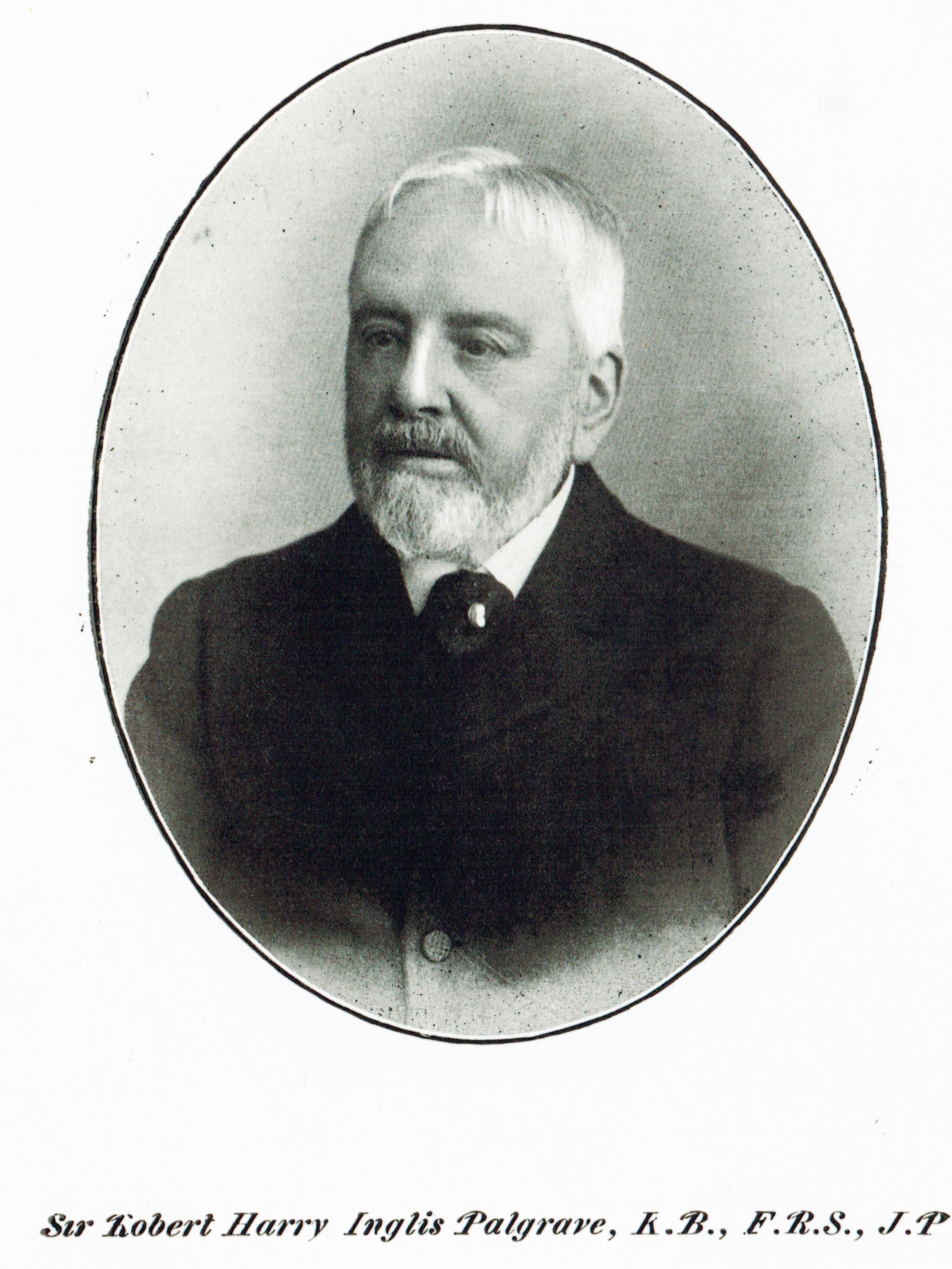
Sir Robert Harry Inglis Palgrave (1827–1919) photographed c. 1911 or earlier

Sir Robert Harry Inglis Palgrave FRS FSS (11 June 1827 – 25 January 1919) was a British economist.

== Early life ==
Robert Harry Inglis Palgrave was born on 11 June 1827. He was the son of Francis Palgrave (born Cohen) and his wife Elizabeth Turner, daughter of the banker Dawson Turner. His brothers were Francis Turner Palgrave, William Gifford Palgrave and Sir Reginald Palgrave.

He was educated at Charterhouse School.

== Career ==
In 1843, at the age of 16, he joined the bank of Deacon, Williams and Co. He then in 1845 joined Dawson Turner Turner and Gurney in Yarmouth, the banking firm of his grandfather Dawson Turner. He was also a director of Barclay and Co. and a clerk of the House of Commons.

In 1877 he became financial editor of The Economist and became editor-in-chief on the death of Walter Bagehot the same year, a position he held until 1883. He produced the three-volume Palgrave's Dictionary of Political Economy (1894, 1896 and 1899) and also edited the collected historical works of his father, Sir Francis Palgrave. He also edited The Banking Almanac until his death, and for a time was editor of The Bankers' Magazine.

He was elected a Fellow of the Royal Society in June 1882. That year he wrote Twelve Etchings of the Rev. E. T. Daniell and 24 copies of the book containing Daniell's etchings were made, but not published. He was knighted in 1909 upon the final completion of his dictionary.

== Personal life ==
He married in 1859 Sarah Maria Brightwen, daughter of George Brightwen of Saffron Walden.
