= Reginald Palgrave =

British civil servant (1829–1904)

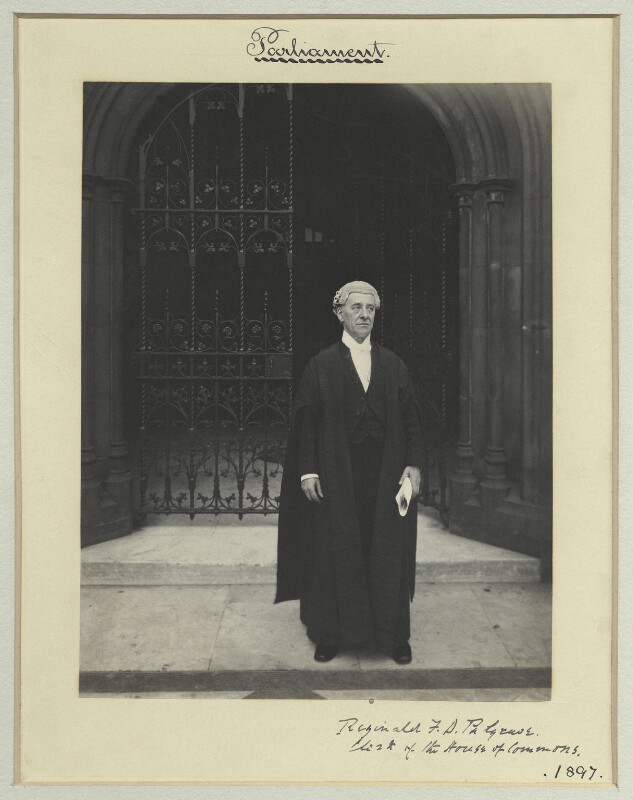
Reginald Palgrave by Benjamin Stone

Sir Reginald Francis Douce Palgrave KCB (28 June 1829 – 13 July 1904) was a British civil servant who was Clerk of the House of Commons.

== Life ==
Reginald Palgrave was born in Westminster, London, the fourth son of Francis Palgrave (born Cohen) and his wife Elizabeth Turner, daughter of banker Dawson Turner. His brothers were Francis Turner Palgrave, William Gifford Palgrave, and Inglis Palgrave. He became a solicitor in 1851; but two years later was appointed a clerk in the House of Commons, becoming clerk of the House on the retirement of Sir Erskine May in 1886. He married Grace Battley, daughter of Richard Battley, in 1857. He was made a Companion of the Order of the Bath (C.B.) in the 1887 Golden Jubilee Honours and advanced to Knight Commander of the Order of Bath (K.C.B.) in 1892, and retired from his office in January 1900. He died in Salisbury in 1904.

== Works ==
- The Chairman's Handbook; The House of Commons: Illustrations of its History and Practice (London, 1869)
- Cromwell: an appreciation based on contemporary evidence (London, 1890)
- Palgrave also helped to edit the tenth edition of Erskine May's Treatise on the Law, Privileges, Proceedings and Usage of Parliament (London, 1893).

== Notes ==
Attribution
