= Richard Battley =

English chemist

- Born: 1770; Wakefield
- Died: 1856 (aged 85–86); Reigate

Richard Battley (1770–1856), was an English chemist.

== Life ==
Battley was the son of an architect in Wakefield, where he was born about 1770. He was educated at Wakefield Grammar School, and after serving as pupil with a physician in Wakefield was appointed medical attendant in connection with the collieries in the district of Newcastle upon Tyne. He then went to London to attend the medical schools, and after concluding his studies entered the service of the Royal Navy as an assistant surgeon, and was present at several engagements under Sir Sidney Smith.

After a few years, however, Battley returned to London, where he carried on the business of an apothecary, first in St. Paul's Churchyard, and afterwards in Fore Street, Cripplegate.

Battley was one of the founding group of the London Ophthalmic Infirmary in 1805, with his friend the surgeon John Cunningham Saunders and the physician John Richard Farre. He for a time supplied the medicines free of cost, and also acted as secretary until 1818. He introduced important improvements in pharmaceutical operations, and at his own house in Fore Street, as well as at the Sanderson Institution, provide a museum of materia medica which was open free to the pupils of all the medical schools.

== Death ==
Battley died at Reigate on 4 March 1856.
