= KEYG (AM) =

- Grand Coulee, Washington; United States
- Frequency: 1490 kHz
- Branding: Key Country 1490 AM

Programming
- Format: Country
- Affiliations: Westwood One

Ownership
- Owner: Wheeler Broadcasting, Inc.
- Operator: Resort Radio, LLC
- Sister stations: KEYG-FM

History
- First air date: 1979
- Last air date: 2021
- Former call signs: KNCW (1979–1983)

Technical information
- Facility ID: 72155
- Class: C
- Power: 1,000 watts day; 960 watts night
- Transmitter coordinates: 47°53′4″N 118°58′20″W

KEYG (1490 AM, "Key Country 1490 AM") was a radio station broadcasting a modern country music format. Licensed to Grand Coulee, Washington, United States, the station was last owned by Wheeler Broadcasting and featured programming from Westwood One.

On June 29, 2020, Wheeler Broadcasting, Inc. and Resort Radio, LLC entered into a management and programming agreement for Resort Radio to begin operating KEYG and KEYG-FM beginning on July 1, with KEYG launching a new country format to better serve the local communities.

The KEYG license was cancelled on December 14, 2021.
