= KLGW =

- Grand Coulee, Washington; United States
- Broadcast area: Central and North Central Washington
- Frequency: 98.5 MHz
- Branding: K-Love

Programming
- Format: Contemporary Christian
- Affiliations: K-Love

Ownership
- Owner: Educational Media Foundation

History
- First air date: 1985 (as KEYG-FM)
- Former call signs: KEYF (1983–1985); KEYG-FM (1985–2022)

Technical information
- Licensing authority: FCC
- Facility ID: 72157
- Class: C0
- ERP: 100,000 watts
- HAAT: 303 meters (994 ft)
- Transmitter coordinates: 47°49′18″N 118°55′59″W
- Translator: 97.7 K249CV (Omak, etc.)

Links
- Public license information: Public file; LMS
- Webcast: Listen live
- Website: www.klove.com

KLGW (98.5 FM, "K-Love") is a radio station broadcasting a Contemporary Christian format. Licensed to Grand Coulee, Washington, United States, the station is owned by Educational Media Foundation.

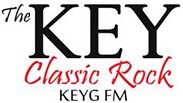
Logo as "The Key"

On June 29, 2020, Wheeler Broadcasting, Inc. and Resort Radio, LLC entered into a management and programming agreement for Resort Radio to begin operating KEYG-FM and KEYG (1490 AM) beginning on July 1. At that time, KEYG-FM flipped to a simulcast of oldies station KCSY "Sunny FM", giving Sunny FM coverage all across Eastern Washington.

In June 2022, the Wheeler family sold KEYG-FM to Educational Media Foundation. The sale, at a price of $150,000, was consummated on November 15, 2022. The station switched to EMF's K-Love contemporary Christian format and then changed its call sign to KLGW on November 22, 2022.
