= KXRX =

- Walla Walla, Washington; United States
- Broadcast area: Tri-Cities, Washington
- Frequency: 97.1 MHz
- Branding: 97 Rock

Programming
- Format: Mainstream rock
- Affiliations: Compass Media Networks; Westwood One

Ownership
- Owner: Townsquare Media; (Townsquare License, LLC)
- Sister stations: KEYW, KFLD, KONA, KONA-FM, KORD-FM, KZHR

History
- First air date: July 4, 1984 (as KAFR-FM)
- Former call signs: KAFR-FM (07/04/84-08/03/89); KNSN (08/03/89-11/18/94)

Technical information
- Licensing authority: FCC
- Facility ID: 16727
- Class: C0
- ERP: 100,000 watts
- HAAT: 405 meters
- Transmitter coordinates: 45°59′4″N 118°10′9″W

Links
- Public license information: Public file; LMS
- Webcast: Listen Live
- Website: 97rockonline.com

KXRX (97.1 FM) is the call sign of the radio station 97 Rock based in Pasco, Washington. The station is owned by Townsquare Media. The call letters are based on the former KXRX/Seattle—a major rock radio station active in Seattle from 1987-1994 on 96.5 FM and now known as The X KXRX, an internet only active rock station.

KXRX's relatively short tenure in the Seattle market was a momentous one, with "The X" establishing itself as one of the first major radio stations to play "grunge," a wave of popular music originating in the Pacific Northwest and soon spanning the globe. The station helped launch the careers of groups such as Nirvana, Pearl Jam, Soundgarden and Alice in Chains, and featured a high-profile corps of deejays that included Mike West, Robin Erickson, John Maynard, and British-born Norman B. (Batley), who introduced listeners to "Seattle Blues," a Sunday night show that drew a large and devoted following.

Bart Becker of Seattle Weekly wrote that Norman B. was "stirring up the Sunday night radio waves" and "breaking the sound barrier." Prompted by the success of "Seattle Blues," KXRX unveiled a new weekly new music show hosted by Norman B. called, "The Xtra Hour."

After seven years of "feisty, personality-oriented album rock," KXRX was sold by Shamrock Broadcasting to Alliance Broadcasting.

The call letters KXRX were at one time assigned to an AM station in San Jose, California, during the 1940s, 1950s and very early 1960s. It played music which would be considered MOR today, artists at the time like Frank Sinatra, Patti Page, etc. When rock music really took off in the late 1950s, KXRX later changed its format to all news, before finally going off the air.

The station runs syndicated shows The Bob & Tom Show and Loudwire.
