= 1480 AM =

AM radio frequency

The following radio stations broadcast on AM frequency 1480 kHz: 1480 AM is a Regional broadcast frequency.

== Argentina ==
- Radio Centro Dolores in Dolores, Buenos Aires.
- APP1480 in La Matanza, Buenos Aires.

== Mexico ==
- XECARH-AM in Cardonal, Hidalgo
- XETKR-AM in Monterrey, Nuevo León, licensed in Guadalupe, Nuevo León
- XEVIC-AM in Ciudad Victoria, Tamaulipas
- XEZJ-AM in Guadalajara, Jalisco

== United States ==
| Call sign | City of license | Facility ID | Class | Daytime power (kW) | Nighttime power (kW) | Unlimited power (kW) | Transmitter coordinates |
|---|---|---|---|---|---|---|---|
| KAUS | Austin, Minnesota | 50677 | B | 1 | 1 | | 43.622222°N 92.990556°W |
| KBMS | Vancouver, Washington | 11162 | B | 1 | 2.5 | | 45.601667°N 122.718333°W |
| KBRO | Bremerton, Washington | 48248 | D | 5 | 0.012 | | 47.564444°N 122.657222°W |
| KCHL | San Antonio, Texas | 40486 | D | 2.5 | 0.09 | | 29.4125°N 98.414444°W |
| KCZZ | Mission, Kansas | 57120 | B | 1 | 0.5 | | 39.068056°N 94.7025°W |
| KEJB | Eureka, California | 35529 | B | 5 | 1 | | 40.741111°N 124.201389°W |
| KHQN | Spanish Fork, Utah | 58480 | D | 1 | 0.133 | | 40.075°N 111.661667°W |
| KIOU | Shreveport, Louisiana | 33714 | D | 1 | 0.129 | | 32.574167°N 93.742778°W |
| KIXD | Pueblo, Colorado | 54259 | D | 1 | 0.107 | | 38.315556°N 104.6175°W |
| KKCQ | Fosston, Minnesota | 52635 | D | 5 | 0.09 | | 47.564167°N 95.724167°W |
| KLEE | Ottumwa, Iowa | 21915 | D | 0.25 | 0.017 | | 41.024444°N 92.482222°W |
| KLVL | Pasadena, Texas | 56148 | B | 5 | 0.5 | | 29.683889°N 95.185833°W |
| KNGO | Dallas, Texas | 57375 | B | 50 | 1.9 | | 32.661667°N 96.657222°W |
| KNTB | Lakewood, Washington | 26892 | D | 1 | 0.111 | | 47.165556°N 122.575556°W |
| KPHX | Phoenix, Arizona | 13790 | B | 5 | 0.5 | | 33.400556°N 112.107778°W |
| KQAM | Wichita, Kansas | 61362 | B | 5 | 1 | | 37.739167°N 97.270556°W |
| KRAE | Cheyenne, Wyoming | 35510 | D | 1 | 0.072 | | 41.121389°N 104.839444°W |
| KRXR | Gooding, Idaho | 2805 | D | 1.3 | 0.08 | | 42.915°N 114.711389°W |
| KSBQ | Santa Maria, California | 38442 | D | 1 | 0.061 | | 34.950556°N 120.489444°W |
| KSDR | Watertown, South Dakota | 20432 | D | 1 | 0.05 | | 44.932778°N 97.105278°W |
| KTHS | Green Forest, Arkansas | 35668 | D | 5 | 0.064 | | 36.361667°N 93.561111°W |
| KVNR | Santa Ana, California | 37223 | B | 5 | 5 | | 33.751667°N 117.910556°W |
| KYOS | Merced, California | 41174 | D | 4.3 | 0.075 | | 37.291944°N 120.434167°W |
| KYWL | Belgrade, Montana | 161553 | B | 1 | 0.157 | | 45.681667°N 111.038333°W |
| WABF | Mobile, Alabama | 70656 | B | 5 | 4.4 | | 30.719722°N 88.071111°W |
| WBBP | Memphis, Tennessee | 6542 | D | 5 | 0.041 | | 35.055°N 90.0875°W |
| WCFR | Springfield, Vermont | 4909 | D | 5 | 0.023 | | 43.281111°N 72.487778°W |
| WCXS | Arcadia, Florida | 72688 | D | 1 | 0.131 | | 27.228611°N 81.857778°W |
| WDAS | Philadelphia, Pennsylvania | 71315 | B | 5 | 1 | | 39.998056°N 75.211944°W |
| WDJO | Cincinnati, Ohio | 32953 | B | 4.5 | 0.3 | | 39.211944°N 84.488889°W |
| WDYS | Somonauk, Illinois | 69700 | B | 0.25 | 0.01 | | 41.906944°N 88.295278°W |
| WRDD | Shippensburg, Pennsylvania | 67452 | D | 0.41 | 0.009 | | 40.075°N 77.535833°W |
| WGFY | Charlotte, North Carolina | 10889 | B | 12 | 5 | | 35.284722°N 80.876111°W |
| WHBC | Canton, Ohio | 4489 | B | 15 | 5 | | 40.8975°N 81.319444°W (daytime); 40.720833°N 81.441111°W (nighttime) |
| WHVO | Hopkinsville, Kentucky | 55651 | D | 1 | 0.024 | | 36.870833°N 87.511944°W |
| WIOS | Tawas City-East Tawas, Michigan | 31477 | D | 1 | 0.109 | | 44.263333°N 83.545°W |
| WJBM | Jerseyville, Illinois | 23265 | D | 0.5 | 0.032 | | 39.112778°N 90.311944°W |
| WJFC | Jefferson City, Tennessee | 18402 | D | 0.5 | 0.034 | | 36.104167°N 83.486111°W |
| WJFG | Latrobe, Pennsylvania | 38377 | B | 0.5 | 1 | | 40.27°N 79.386944°W |
| WJLE | Smithville, Tennessee | 37053 | D | 1 | 0.034 | | 35.925278°N 85.820556°W |
| WJTW | Bridgeport, Alabama | 57794 | D | 1 | 0.039 | | 34.942778°N 85.707222°W |
| WKND | Windsor, Connecticut | 26302 | D | 0.5 | 0.014 | | 41.852778°N 72.678611°W |
| WLEA | Hornell, New York | 52841 | D | 2.5 | 0.019 | | 42.2875°N 77.646389°W |
| WLMV | Madison, Wisconsin | 41901 | B | 5 | 5 | | 43.025°N 89.396667°W |
| WMDD | Fajardo, Puerto Rico | 51427 | B | | | 5 | 18.362778°N 65.64°W |
| WMMA | Irondale, Alabama | 726 | D | 5 | 0.028 | | 33.548333°N 86.665556°W |
| WNKW | Neon, Kentucky | 37154 | D | 1 | | | 37.198333°N 82.711667°W |
| WPFJ | Franklin, North Carolina | 17566 | D | 5 | 0.013 | | 35.179444°N 83.352778°W |
| WPFR | Terre Haute, Indiana | 70653 | B | 0.244 | 0.03 | | 39.500556°N 87.386111°W |
| WPWC | Dumfries-Triangle, Virginia | 25995 | B | 5 | 0.5 | | 38.568333°N 77.338889°W |
| WQTM | Fair Bluff, North Carolina | 2860 | D | 10 | 0.048 | | 34.323056°N 79.001944°W |
| WRCK | Remsen, New York | 466 | D | 5 | | | 43.324722°N 75.175278°W |
| WRSW | Warsaw, Indiana | 73968 | B | 1 | 0.5 | | 41.2225°N 85.838056°W |
| WSAR | Fall River, Massachusetts | 6879 | B | | | 5 | 41.723889°N 71.189167°W |
| WSDS | Salem Township, Michigan | 35335 | B | 0.75 | 3.8 | | 42.261667°N 83.619444°W |
| WSLI | Kentwood, Michigan | 24785 | B | 2 | 5 | | 42.843333°N 85.618611°W |
| WTLO | Somerset, Kentucky | 14726 | D | 1 | 0.027 | | 37.080556°N 84.660833°W |
| WTOX | Bensley, Virginia | 129524 | D | 1 | 0.01 | | 37.682222°N 77.563889°W |
| WTOY | Salem, Virginia | 29210 | D | 5 | 0.02 | | 37.2725°N 80.081111°W |
| WUNA | Ocoee, Florida | 19054 | D | 1 | 0.071 | | 28.557778°N 81.541111°W |
| WYRN | Louisburg, North Carolina | 22312 | D | 0.5 | 0.035 | | 36.112778°N 78.280556°W |
| WYZE | Atlanta, Georgia | 24145 | D | 7 | 0.045 | | 33.723611°N 84.368889°W |
| WZJY | Mount Pleasant, South Carolina | 47150 | D | 0.88 | 0.044 | | 32.825°N 79.831389°W |
| WZRC | New York, New York | 27398 | B | 5 | 5 | | 40.845°N 74.02°W |
