= Seattle Sounders Radio Network =

The Seattle Sounders FC soccer team air their games in English & Spanish on local radio. The English-language station is Sports Radio 950 KJR-AM while the 3-station Spanish-language network originates at KBRO and airs on the ESPN Deportes affiliates around the Pacific Northwest. The ESPN Deportes network comprises 3 A.M. stations and 1 F.M. translator. The Spanish network also includes a 30-minute pregame & 30-minute postgame analysis.

== Radio Network (3 stations + 1 F.M. translator) ==
- 1280/KLDY: Lacey (2014-)
- 1480/KNTB: Lakewood (2014-)
- 1490/KBRO: Bremerton (2014-)
- 92.1/K221FJ: Tacoma (rebroadcasts KNTB)

=== Unsure status (2 stations) ===
- 1210/KMIA: Auburn-Federal Way
- 99.3/KDDS-FM: Elma, Washington
