= WRSW =

WRSW may refer to:

- WRSW (AM), a radio station (1480 AM) licensed to Warsaw, Indiana, United States
- WRSW-FM, a radio station (107.3 FM) licensed to Warsaw, Indiana, United States
