= WSRC =

WSRC may refer to:

- WSRC (FM), a radio station (88.1 FM) licensed to serve Waynetown, Indiana, United States
- WQTM, a radio station (1480 AM) licensed to serve Fair Bluff, North Carolina, United States, which held the call sign WSRC from June 2006 to January 2009
- WRJD, a radio station (1410 AM) licensed to serve Durham, North Carolina, which used the call sign WSRC until March 2006
- Washington Savannah River Company, SRS
- West Side Rowing Club, a rowing club in Buffalo, New York, United States
- Westinghouse Savannah River Company, SRS
