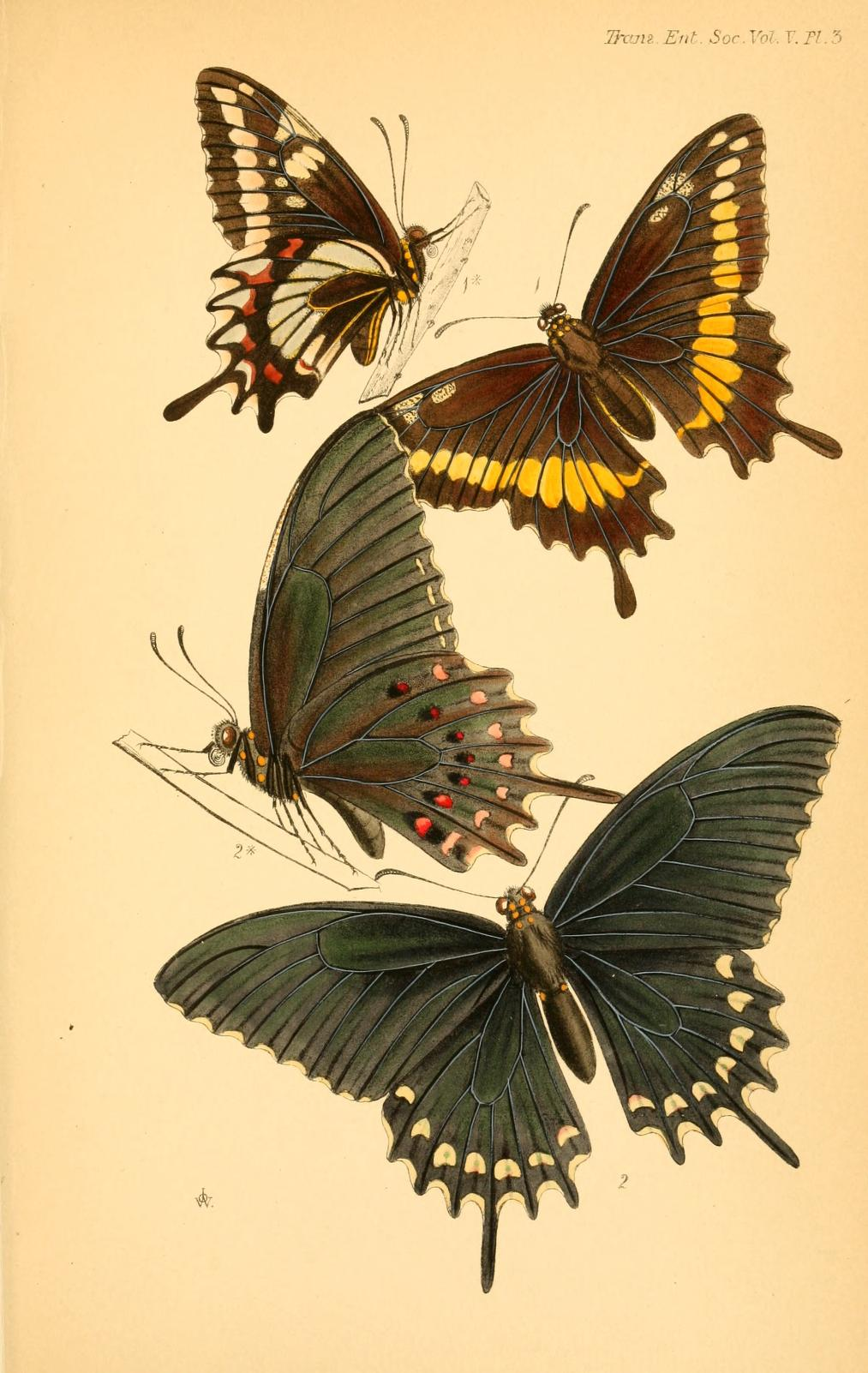
- Plate accompanying Westwood's 1847 description

Scientific classification
- Kingdom: Animalia
- Phylum: Arthropoda
- Clade: Pancrustacea
- Class: Insecta
- Order: Lepidoptera
- Family: Papilionidae
- Genus: Papilio
- Species: P. erostratus

Binomial name
- Papilio erostratus Westwood, 1847

Synonyms
- Papilio rhetus Gray, [1853]

= Papilio erostratus =

Erostratus swallowtail

Species of butterfly

Papilio erostratus, the Erostratus swallowtail, is a species of Neotropical swallowtail butterfly from the genus Papilio that is found in Guatemala, Costa Rica, Belize and Mexico.

== Description ==
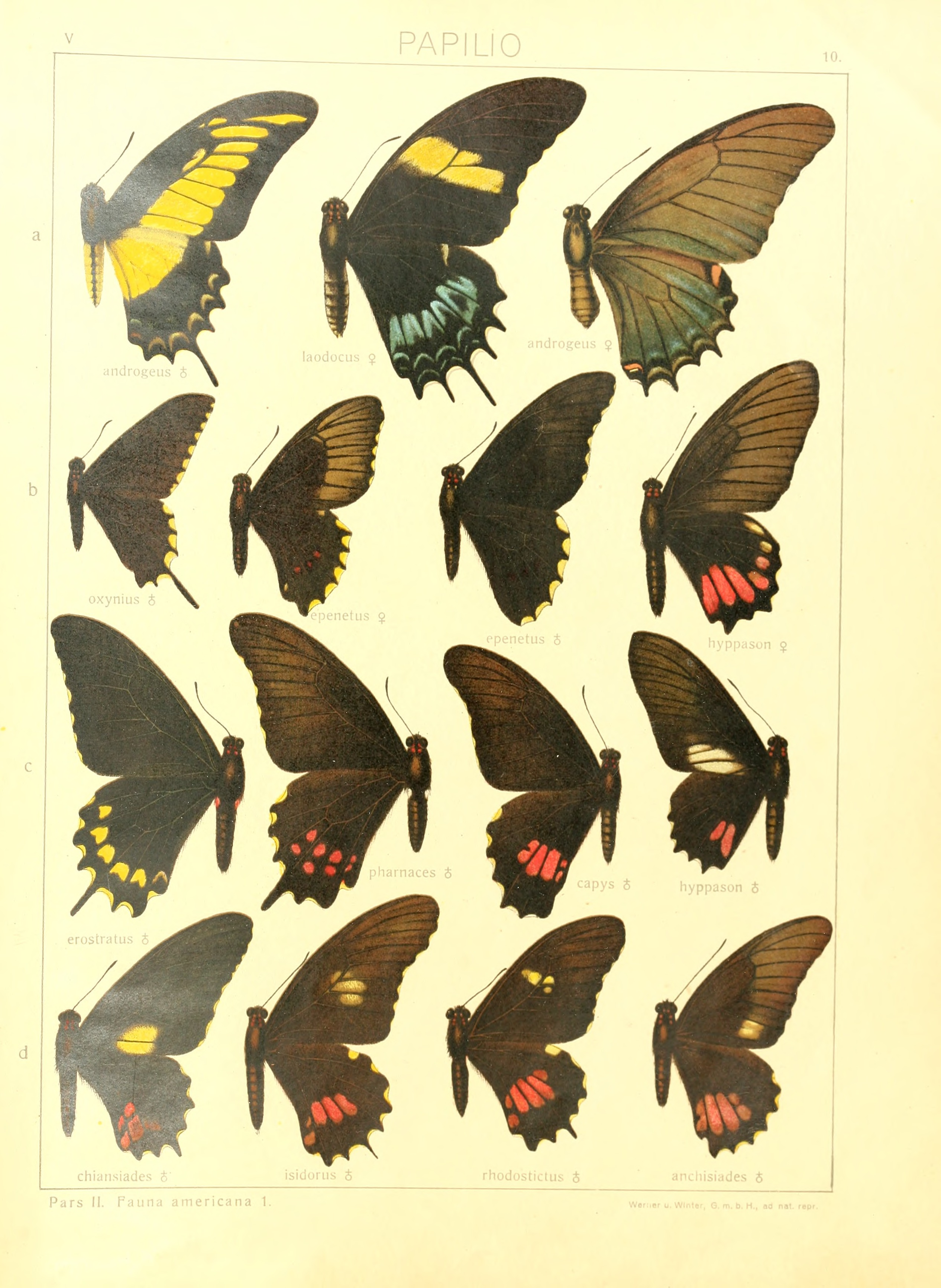
Plate from Adalbert Seitz's The Macrolepidoptera of the World showing both Papilio erostratus and Papilio rogeri pharnaces

It is very similar to Papilio pharnaces but in the male the spots on the upper surface of the hindwing are yellowish white. In the female the spots are red also above, larger than in the female of P. pharnaces the marginal spots of both wings also somewhat larger than in the foregoing species. Tail long and narrow. Sympatric with P. pharnaces in western Mexico.

== Habitat ==
It is most common in hilly country at a height of about 1500 m (approximately 5,000 ft).

== Subspecies ==
- Papilio erostratus erostratus – (Guatemala, Costa Rica, Belize)
- Papilio erostratus erostratinus Vázquez, 1947 – (Mexico)
- Papilio erostratus vazquezae Beutelspacher, 1986 – (Mexico

== Taxonomy ==
Papilio erostratus is a member of the anchisiades species group
