= KYAH =

- For the former radio station which held the callsign KYAH, see KNAK (AM).
- For the Australian soccer player, see Kyah Simon.
- Kyah Cahill
