= WAWC =

American country music radio station

- Syracuse, Indiana; United States
- Broadcast area: Warsaw, Indiana
- Frequency: 103.5 MHz
- Branding: Willie 103.5 FM

Programming
- Format: Country music
- Affiliations: Fox News Radio; Compass Media Networks; Westwood One

Ownership
- Owner: Kensington Digital Media of Indiana, L.L.C.
- Sister stations: WRDI, WRSW, WRSW-FM

Technical information
- Licensing authority: FCC
- Facility ID: 72487
- Class: A
- ERP: 3,000 watts
- HAAT: 100.0 meters (328.1 ft)
- Transmitter coordinates: 41°22′57.00″N 85°41′35.00″W

Links
- Public license information: Public file; LMS
- Webcast: Listen Live
- Website: willie1035.com

WAWC (103.5 FM) is a radio station broadcasting a country music format. Licensed to Syracuse, Indiana, United States, the station is currently owned by Kensington Digital Media of Indiana, L.L.C., and features programming from Fox News Radio, Compass Media Networks, and Westwood One.

Prior to becoming Willie 103.5 at the end of 2006, the station had been known as Hoosier 103.5 which featured pop and rock, Indiana high school and college sports broadcasts and morning show entertainment.
