= XHCARH-FM =

SRCI radio station in Cardonal, Hidalgo, Mexico

XHCARH-FM / XECARH-AM
- Cardonal, Hidalgo; Mexico
- Frequencies: 89.1 FM; 1480 AM
- Branding: La Voz del Pueblo Hñahñu

Programming
- Format: Indigenous community radio

Ownership
- Owner: National Institute of Indigenous Peoples
- Operator: Sistema de Radiodifusoras Culturales Indígenas

History
- First air date: 1 August 1998
- Call sign meaning: CARdonal, Hidalgo

Technical information
- Class: A (FM); B (AM)
- Power: 5 kW (daytimer)
- ERP: 3 kW (FM)
- Transmitter coordinates: 20°37′02.0″N 99°07′25.3″W

Links
- Webcast: Listen live
- Website: ecos.inpi.gob.mx

XHCARH-FM/XECARH-AM (La Voz del Pueblo Hñahñu – "The Voice of the Hñahñu People") is an indigenous community radio station that broadcasts in Spanish, Hñahñu and Nahuatl from Cardonal in the Mexican state of Hidalgo. It is run by the Sistema de Radiodifusoras Culturales Indígenas (SRCI) of the National Institute of Indigenous Peoples (INPI). It came on air in 1998 as XECARH-AM, a daytime-only station on 1480 AM. In 2012, XECARH was authorized to move to FM XHCARH-FM 89.1. While this station is on the air, XECARH cannot be shut off as it is the last radio service in portions of its AM coverage area where the FM station does not reach.
