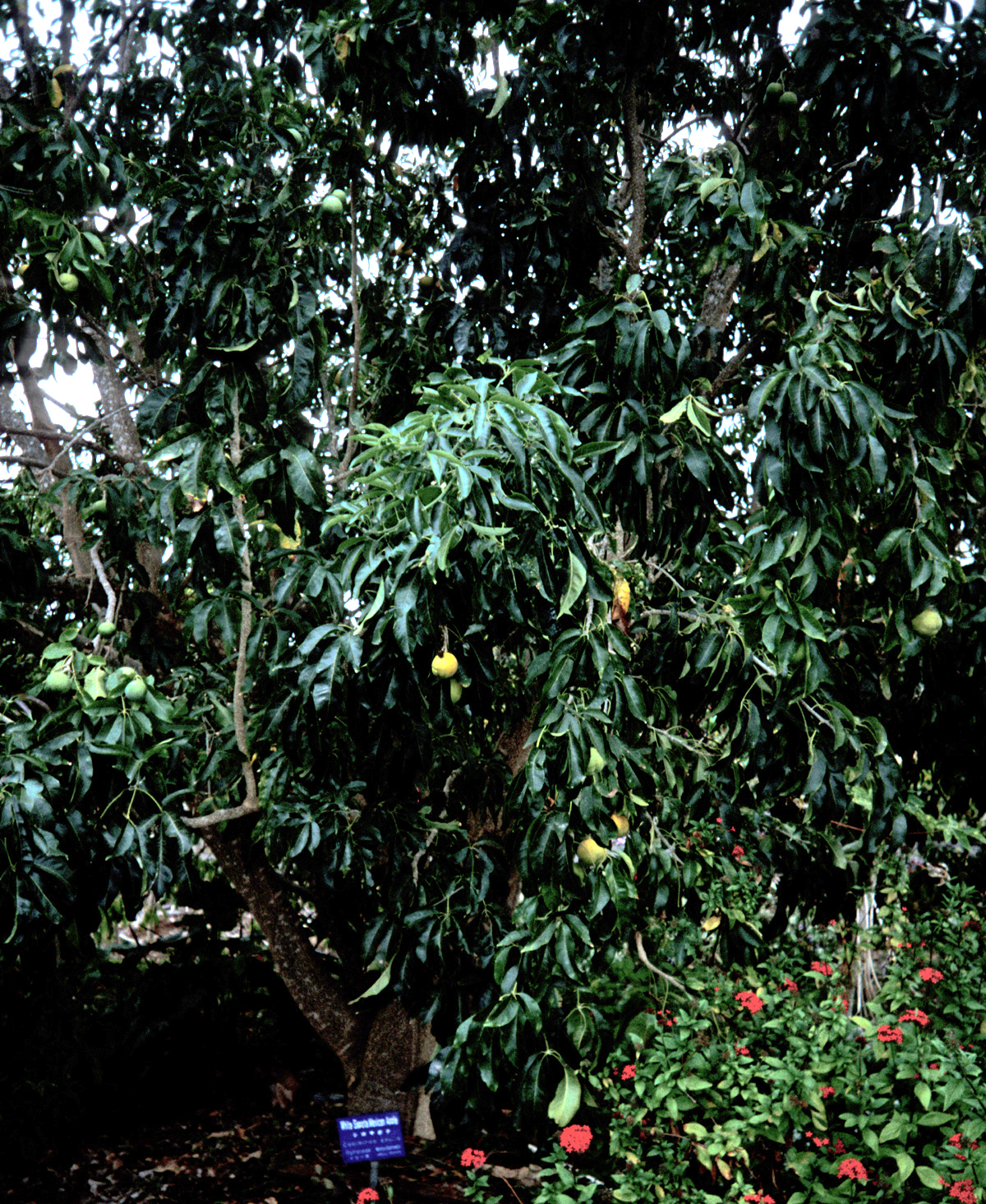

Scientific classification
- Kingdom: Plantae
- Clade: Embryophytes
- Clade: Tracheophytes
- Clade: Angiosperms
- Clade: Eudicots
- Clade: Rosids
- Order: Sapindales
- Family: Rutaceae
- Genus: Casimiroa
- Species: C. edulis

Binomial name
- Casimiroa edulis La Llave

= White sapote =

Species of tree

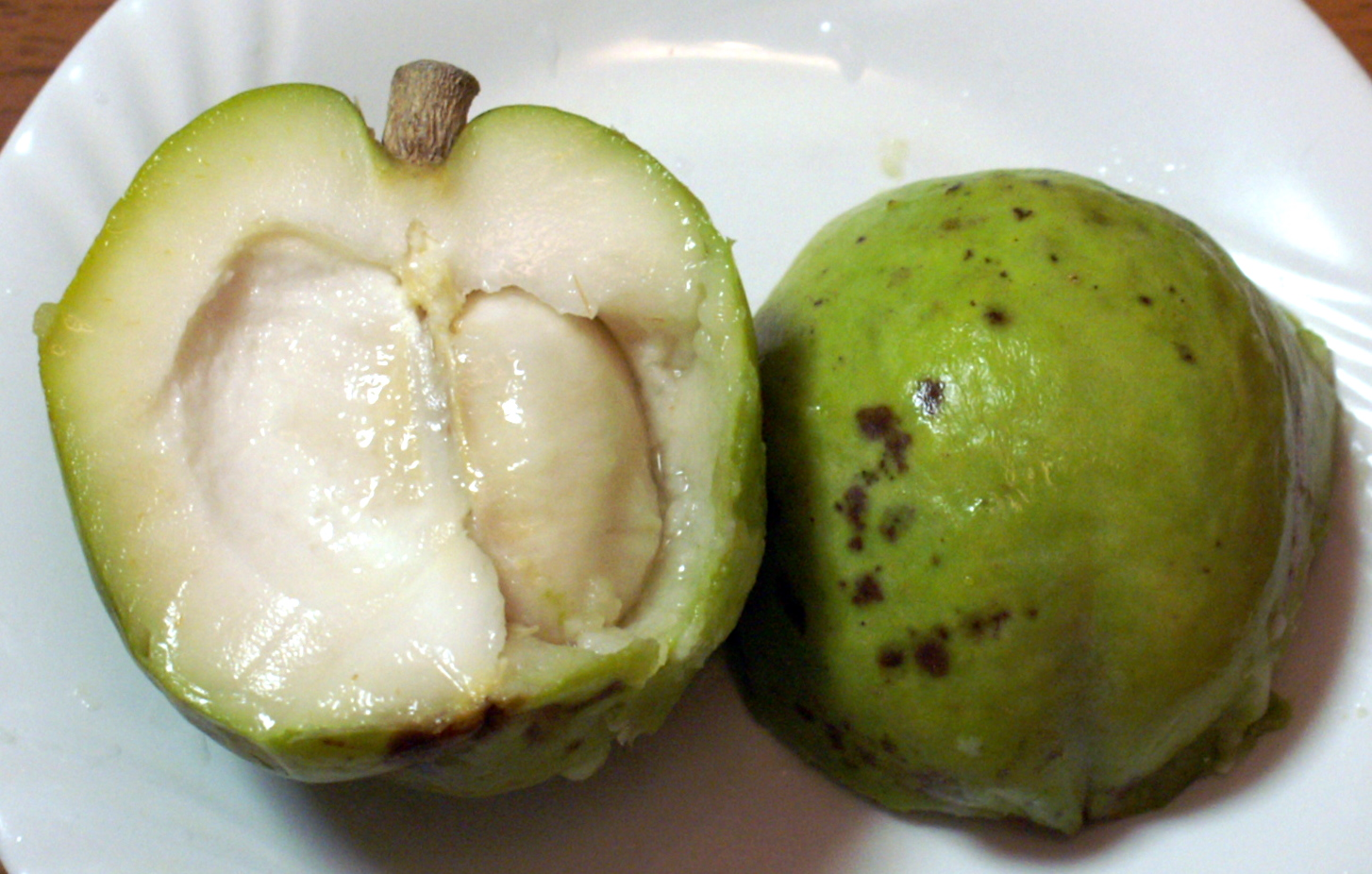

The white sapote, scientific name Casimiroa edulis, also called casimiroa and Mexican apple, and known as cochitzapotl in the Nahuatl language (meaning "sleep-sapote") is a species of tropical fruiting tree in the family Rutaceae, native to eastern Mexico and Central America south to Costa Rica. The genus is named for "an Otomi Indian, Casimiro Gómez, from the town of Cardonal in Hidalgo, Mexico, who fought and died in Mexico's war of independence."

== Description ==
Mature C. edulis trees range from 5–16 m (16–52 ft) tall and are evergreen. The leaves are alternate, palmately compound with three to five leaflets, the leaflets 6–13 cm long and 2.5–5 cm broad with an entire margin, and the leaf petiole 10–15 cm long.

The fruit is an ovoid drupe, 5–10 cm in diameter, with a thin, edible skin turning from green to yellow when ripe, and an edible pulp, which can range in flavor from bland to banana-like to peach to pear to vanilla flan. The pulp can be creamy-white in green-skin varieties or a beige-yellow in yellow-skin varieties and has a smooth texture similar to ripe avocado. It contains from one to five large inedible seeds that are said to have narcotic properties.

== Chemical constituents ==
Studies carried out on the white sapote's seeds have identified many pharmacologically active compounds, including: N-methylhistamine, N,N-dimethylhistamine, and histamine. It also contains 2′,5,6-trimethoxyflavone, 2′, 6',5,6,-tetramethoxyflavone (zapotin), and 5-hydroxy-2′,6,7-trimethoxyflavone (zapotinin).

== Health effects ==
Several in vitro studies have shown that zapotin has potential anticarcinogenic effects against isolated colon cancer cells.

The fruit has long been thought to produce drowsiness, as claimed by Francisco Hernández de Toledo in the 16th century, but this may be a misinterpretation of the Nahuatl name of the plant, cochitzapotl (meaning '"sleep-sapote"), as its seeds were processed to produce a poison by the Aztecs, and the seeds and leaves, but not fruit pulp of the plant, contain sleep-inducing compounds.

== Taxonomy ==
Unlike the mamey sapote, white sapote is a member of the family Rutaceae, to which citrus belongs.

== See also ==
- List of culinary fruits
