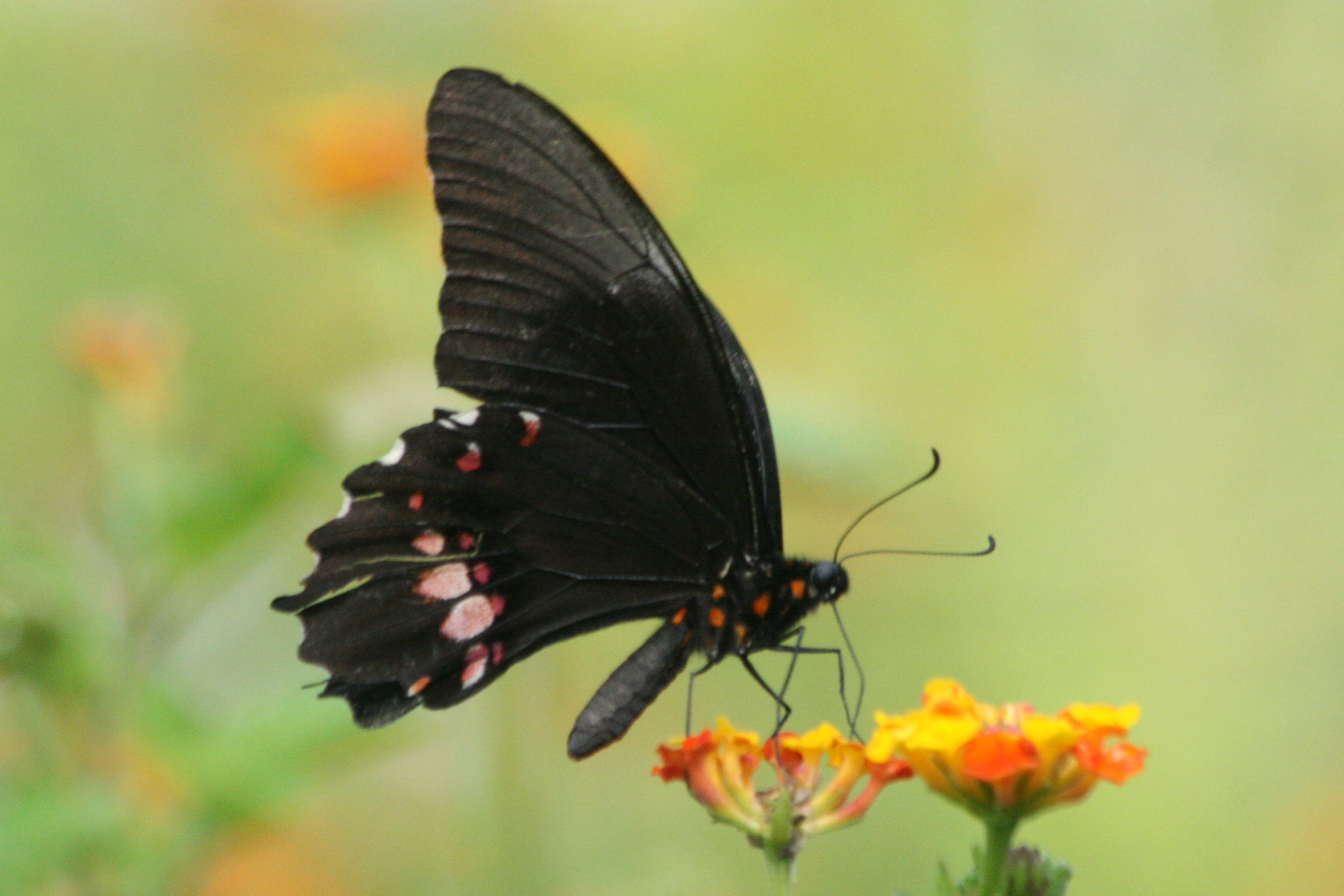

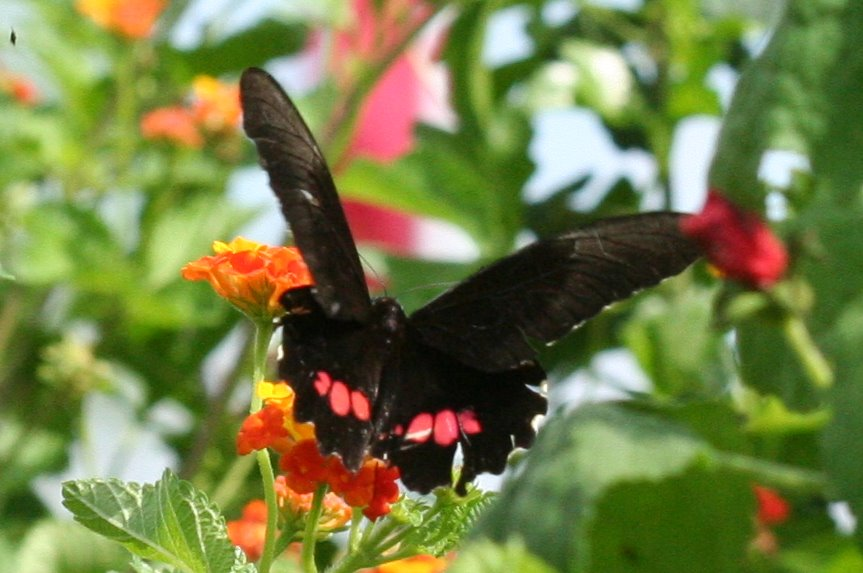

Conservation status
- Secure (NatureServe)

Scientific classification
- Kingdom: Animalia
- Phylum: Arthropoda
- Clade: Pancrustacea
- Class: Insecta
- Order: Lepidoptera
- Family: Papilionidae
- Genus: Papilio
- Species: P. anchisiades

Binomial name
- Papilio anchisiades Esper, 1788

Subspecies
- 6, see text

Synonyms
- Papilio anchises Stoll, 1780, not Linnaeus, 1758; Papilio hipponous Hübner, [1819]; Papilio archelaus Godart, 1819; Papilio theramenes C. & R. Felder, 1861; Heraclides matusiki Johnson & Rozycki, 1986; Papilio isidorus Bates, 1861 (preocc. Doubleday, 1846); Papilio pompeius Kirby, 1871 (preocc. Fabricius, 1781); Heraclides isidorus; Priamides anchisiades; Heraclides anchisiades; Papilio idaeus Fabricius, 1793; Papilio pandion Bates, 1861; Papilio pandion C. & R. Felder, 1865; Papilio pandonius Staudinger, 1894; Papilio evander Godart, 1819 (preocc. Stoll, 1780)

= Papilio anchisiades =

Species of butterfly

Papilio anchisiades, the ruby-spotted swallowtail or red-spotted swallowtail, is a butterfly of the family Papilionidae. It is found from southern Texas south to Argentina. Rare strays can be found up to Kansas, southeastern Arizona, and western Texas.

== Description (Seitz) ==
The wingspan is 70–100 mm.P. anchisiades. A widely distributed variable species. Hindwing posteriorly somewhat prolonged, less triangular; the tail is wanting or is only somewhat longer than the other marginal teeth, yet in the female sometimes as long and pointed as in the following species. The red spots of both the rows of the hindwing on the underside partly contiguous, or at least two pairs placed quite close together. Larva often resting together in hundreds on the stems of citrus. A very common insect, which is fond drinking at moist places on the banks of rivers; not a forest species. — idaeus F. (=pandion Feldr., pandonius Stgr.). Forewing usually with a distinct white spot at the end of the cell above and beneath or only beneath. Central America, from Mexico to Panama. — anchisiades Esp. (= anchises L. partim, theramenes Fldr,, pompeius Kirby) (10d). Very variable. Forewing with two white spots posteriorly of 1. median vein, either on both sides or only beneath, on the underside also a spot before the 1. median, rarely present above, and sometimes one before the 3. radial. In other specimens the white spots are wanting above: the forewing is dark from the base to the apex of the cell and then paler, and has a row of white spots beneath. From Colombia to Para and Bolivia. — capys Hbn. (= evander Godt.) (10c). Forewing without white spots on the upperside; the disc paler, the dark proximal area rounded; on the underside a row of white spots, one of which is placed in the cell. East Bolivia, North Argentina, Paraguay and Brazil.

The larvae feed on various species of the family Rutaceae, including Citrus, Casimiroa, and Zanthoxylum species. The adults feed on flower nectar.

== Subspecies ==
Listed alphabetically.

- Papilio anchisiades anchisiades – (Venezuela, Colombia to the Guayanas, Peru)
- Papilio anchisiades capys (Hübner, [1809]) – (Bolivia to Parana, Argentina, Paraguay)
- Papilio anchisiades idaeus (Fabricius, 1793) – ruby-spotted swallowtail (Texas, Mexico to Panama)
- Papilio anchisiades lamasi (Brown, 1994) – (Ecuador)
- Papilio anchisiades philastrius Fruhstorfer, 1915 – (Trinidad)

== Taxonomy ==
Papilio anchisiades is the nominotypical member of the anchisiades species group

- Papilio anchisiades Esper, 1788
- Papilio chiansiades Westwood, 1872
- Papilio epenetus Hewitson, 1861
- Papilio erostratus Westwood, 1847
- Papilio hyppason Cramer, 1775
- Papilio isidorus Doubleday, 1846
- Papilio oxynius (Geyer, [1827])
- Papilio pelaus Fabricius, 1775
- Papilio rogeri Boisduval, 1836

== Etymology ==
The specific epithet is in the Classical tradition and refers to the GraecoRoman Anchisiades

== Gallery ==
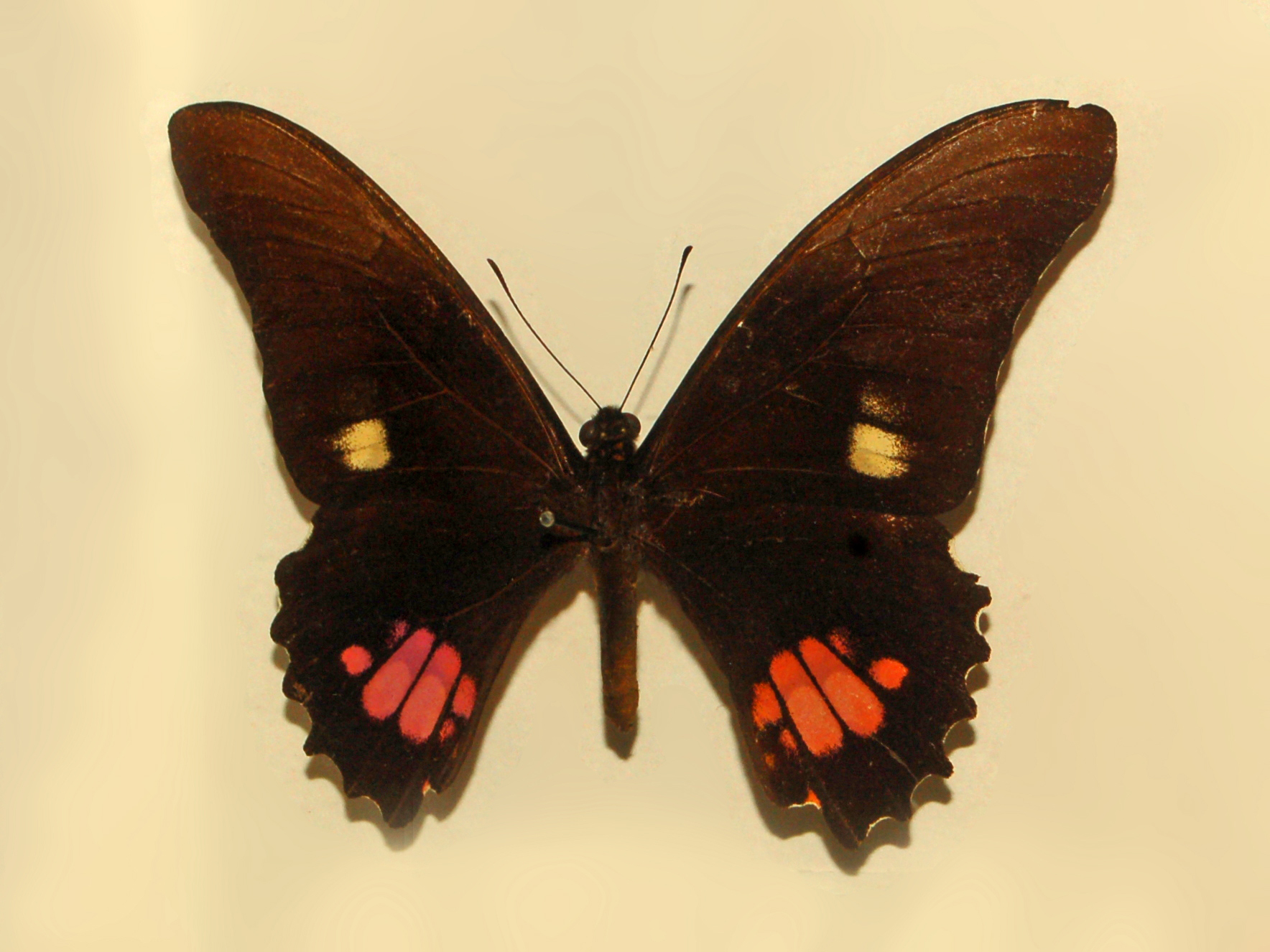
Mounted specimen from Peru

== Other reading ==
- Bauer, Erich and Thomas Frankenbach (1998). Schmetterlinge der Erde, Butterflies of the World Part I (1), Papilionidae Papilionidae I: Papilio, Subgenus Achillides, Bhutanitis, Teinopalpus. Edited by Erich Bauer and Thomas Frankenbach. Keltern: Goecke & Evers; Canterbury: Hillside Books ISBN 9783931374624
- Lewis, H. L. (1974). Butterflies of the World ISBN 0-245-52097-X Page 24, figure 9.
