= WLTM =

WLTM may refer to:

== Radio stations ==
- WLTM (FM), a radio station (90.3 FM) licensed to serve Harrisburg, Illinois, United States
- WEBG (FM), a radio station (95.9 FM) licensed to serve Mina, New York, United States, which held the call sign WLTM from December 2017 to September 2020
- WIBT, a radio station (97.9 FM) licensed to serve Greenville, Mississippi, United States, which held the call sign WLTM from April 2010 to February 2017
- WBZW, a radio station (96.7 FM) licensed to serve Peachtree City, Georgia, United States, which held the call sign WLTM from December 2006 to January 2008
- WUBL, a radio station (94.9 FM) licensed to serve Atlanta, Georgia, which held the call sign WLTM from March 2003 to December 2006
- WNFL, a radio station (99.7 FM) licensed to serve Sturgeon Bay, Wisconsin, United States, which held the call sign WLTM from September 1996 to April 2002
- WQQB, a radio station (96.1 FM) licensed to serve Rantoul, Illinois, United States, which held the call sign WLTM from October 1987 to December 1995
- WPFJ, a radio station (1480 AM) licensed to serve Franklin, North Carolina, United States, which held the call sign WLTM until June 1987

== Other uses ==
- Would like to meet, in personal advertisements
