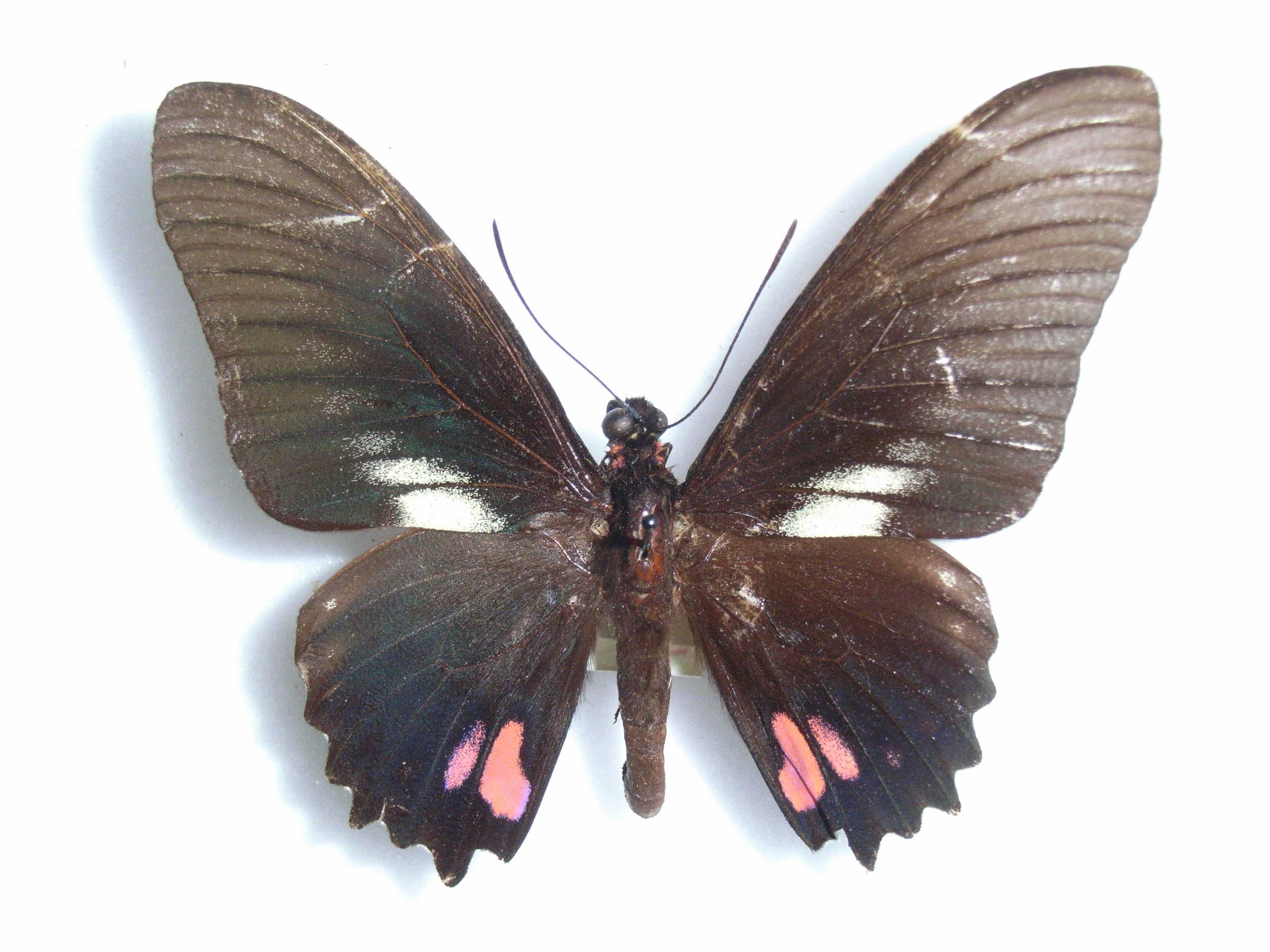

Scientific classification
- Kingdom: Animalia
- Phylum: Arthropoda
- Clade: Pancrustacea
- Class: Insecta
- Order: Lepidoptera
- Family: Papilionidae
- Genus: Papilio
- Species: P. hyppason

Binomial name
- Papilio hyppason Cramer, 1775

Synonyms
- Papilio amosis Cramer, 1780 (preocc. Cramer, 1777); Papilio hippasonides Grose-Smith, 1902; Heraclides hyppason

= Papilio hyppason =

Species of butterfly

Papilio hyppason is a Neotropical butterfly of the family Papilionidae. It is found in Suriname, Brazil, Bolivia, Peru, Venezuela and Ecuador.

== Description ==
Tailless. Pronotum spotted with red. Hindwing beneath with red basal spot behind the cell. Subcostal of the hindwing much more proximal than the 2. median. Sexes different from one another, each variable in itself, male-f. hyppason Cr. (= hippasonides Grose-Smith) has a broad band on the forewing, mostly abbreviated. In male-f ptilion R. & J. the band of the forewing is narrow and placed farther from the cell. The female occurs likewise in 2 principal forms: female-f.amosis Cr. has a black forewing, on which scarcely a trace of white discal spots is visible. In female-f. paraensis Bates, on the contrary, the forewing has one or several white or yellowish white spots. These forms occur together, though not everywhere.

== Biology ==
The butterfly is found at the edges of swampy woods and has a swift flight. It is a lowland species. The larva feeds on Piper belemense.

== Taxonomy ==
Papilio hyppason is a member of the anchisiades species group
