= KLDY =

Simulcast of KLSY
- Lacey, Washington; United States
- Frequency: 1280 kHz
- Branding: La Estación de la Familia

Programming
- Language: Spanish
- Format: Contemporary Christian

Ownership
- Owner: Iglesia Pentecostal Víspera del Fin
- Sister stations: KBRO

History
- First air date: 1983 (as KTOL)
- Former call signs: KTOL (1983–1997)
- Call sign meaning: "K-Lady"

Technical information
- Licensing authority: FCC
- Facility ID: 3711
- Class: B
- Power: 1,000 watts day; 500 watts night
- Transmitter coordinates: 47°3′44″N 122°49′49″W
- Translator: (92.1 MHz) K221GR (Lacey)

Links
- Public license information: Public file; LMS
- Webcast: Listen live
- Website: laestaciondelafamilia.org

KLDY (1280 AM) is a radio station licensed to Lacey, Washington, United States. The station is owned by Iglesia Pentecostal Víspera del Fin. The station broadcasts at a power of 1,000 watts during the day and 500 watts at night from its transmitter site located near the Deschutes River.

== History ==
The station began broadcasting on the 1280 kHz frequency in Lacey, Washington, following the vacancy left when KMAS moved to 1030 kHz. During this transition period, the station adopted the call sign KTOL on April 18, 1983. It was then assigned the call letters KQEU and served the Olympia and Lacey metropolitan areas with a variety of formats, including news/talk and adult standards. In 1996, the station was acquired by Skip Marrow's Lacey Broadcasting and adopted a classic country format branded as "K-Country".

In the early 2000s, the station shifted toward a multicultural and religious broadcasting model. On August 22, 2002, the station changed its call sign to KLDY. Under the ownership of Sacred Heart Radio, Inc., which purchased the station in 2004 for $425,000, KLDY became an affiliate of the EWTN Global Catholic Radio Network. KLDY then operated as a non-commercial educational station with a Catholic radio format. Its current format is Spanish contemporary, and religious.
