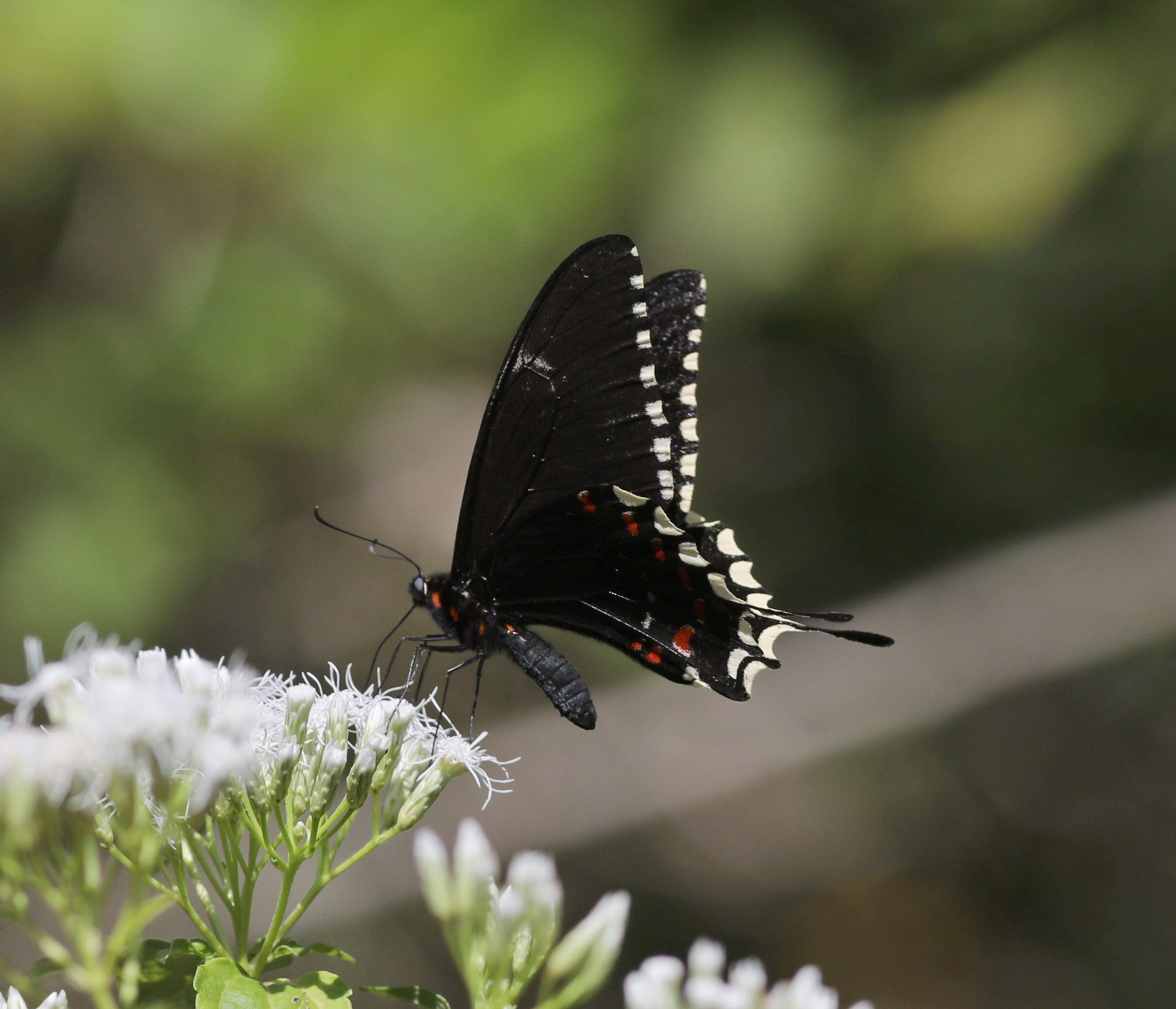

Scientific classification
- Kingdom: Animalia
- Phylum: Arthropoda
- Clade: Pancrustacea
- Class: Insecta
- Order: Lepidoptera
- Family: Papilionidae
- Genus: Papilio
- Species: P. oxynius

Binomial name
- Papilio oxynius (Geyer, [1827])

Synonyms
- Laertias oxynius Geyer, [1827]; Papilio augustus Boisduval, 1836; Papilio oxynius f. ochracea Rousseau-Decelle, 1933; Papilio oxynius f. niveomarginatus Rousseau-Decelle, 1933

= Papilio oxynius =

Species of butterfly

Papilio oxynius, the Cuban black swallowtail, is a species of Neotropical swallowtail butterfly from the genus Papilio that is found in Cuba.

== Description ==
Similar to P. pelaus but the band of the forewing only indicated; the marginal spots of both wings large.

== Biology ==
Larvae feed on Xanthoxylum. Adults are gregarious by day, resting on the trunk and branches.

== Taxonomy ==
Papilio oxynius is a member of the anchisiades species group.
