= KANY =

- Cosmopolis, Washington; United States
- Broadcast area: Aberdeen, Washington
- Frequency: 107.3 MHz
- Branding: Y107.3

Programming
- Format: Top 40 (CHR)

Ownership
- Owner: Jodesha Broadcasting
- Sister stations: KJET, KSWW

History
- First air date: October 25, 2007 (as KLSY at 107.9)
- Former call signs: KLSY (2006–2014)
- Former frequencies: 107.9 MHz (2007–2014)

Technical information
- Licensing authority: FCC
- Facility ID: 166011
- Class: A
- ERP: 4,100 watts
- HAAT: 122 meters (400 ft)
- Transmitter coordinates: 46°56′0″N 123°43′57″W

Links
- Public license information: Public file; LMS
- Webcast: KANY webcast online
- Website: KANY online

KANY (107.3 FM, "Y107.3") is a radio station broadcasting a Top 40 (CHR) format. Licensed to Cosmopolis, Washington, United States, the station is currently owned by Jodesha Broadcasting.

On May 7, 2014, the then-KLSY changed their format from classic rock to country, branded as "Bigfoot 107.3". (The "Bigfoot" country format was previously on KANY 93.7 FM Montesano, Washington, which is now airing Spanish Religious programming.) On May 19, 2014, KLSY changed their call letters to KANY.

On October 19, 2021, KZNY changed their format from country (which moved to KSWW-HD4 Ocean Shores and translator K281DE 104.1 FM Aberdeen) to hot adult contemporary, branded as "Y107.3". The former hot adult contemporary format moved to KANY from KJET 105.7 FM Raymond, which is preparing to move to Union, Washington. Two days later, the stations changed their format to top 40/CHR.
