= Papilio maroni =

Conservation status
- Data Deficient (IUCN 2.3)

Scientific classification
- Kingdom: Animalia
- Phylum: Arthropoda
- Clade: Pancrustacea
- Class: Insecta
- Order: Lepidoptera
- Family: Papilionidae
- Genus: Papilio
- Species: P. maroni

Binomial name
- Papilio maroni Moreau, 1923

Species of butterfly

Papilio maroni (also known as Maron's swallowtail) is a species of butterfly in the family Papilionidae. It is native to French Guiana. It is considered a subspecies of Papilio chiansiades.

== Description ==
Papilio maroni is a large butterfly. Their wing sizes range from 52 millimetres to 55 millimetres.

== Distribution ==
Papilio maroni is found only in French Guiana. There have been many records of the species living around St. Laurent, on the Maroni river.
