= Zapotin =

Names
- IUPAC name 2′,5,6,6′-Tetramethoxyflavone
- Systematic IUPAC name 2-(2,6-Dimethoxyphenyl)-5,6-dimethoxy-4H-1-benzopyran-4-one

Identifiers
CAS Number	14813-19-5
3D model (JSmol)	Interactive image
ChemSpider	547068
PubChem CID	629965
UNII	Z7CW4S27SB
CompTox Dashboard (EPA)	DTXSID80348078
- InChI: InChI=1S/C19H18O6/c1-21-12-6-5-7-13(22-2)18(12)16-10-11(20)17-14(25-16)8-9-15(23-3)19(17)24-4/h5-10H,1-4H3 Key: PBQMALAAFQMDSP-UHFFFAOYSA-N
- SMILES: O=C\1c3c(OC)c(OC)ccc3O/C(=C/1)c2c(OC)cccc2OC

Properties
Chemical formula	C_{19}H_{18}O_{6}
Molar mass	342.347 g·mol^{−1}
- Except where otherwise noted, data are given for materials in their standard state (at 25 °C [77 °F], 100 kPa). Infobox references

Zapotin is a natural chemical compound, classified as a flavone, isolated from white sapote (Casimiroa edulis).

Several recent in vitro studies have shown that zapotin has potential anti-carcinogenic effects against isolated colon cancer cells.
