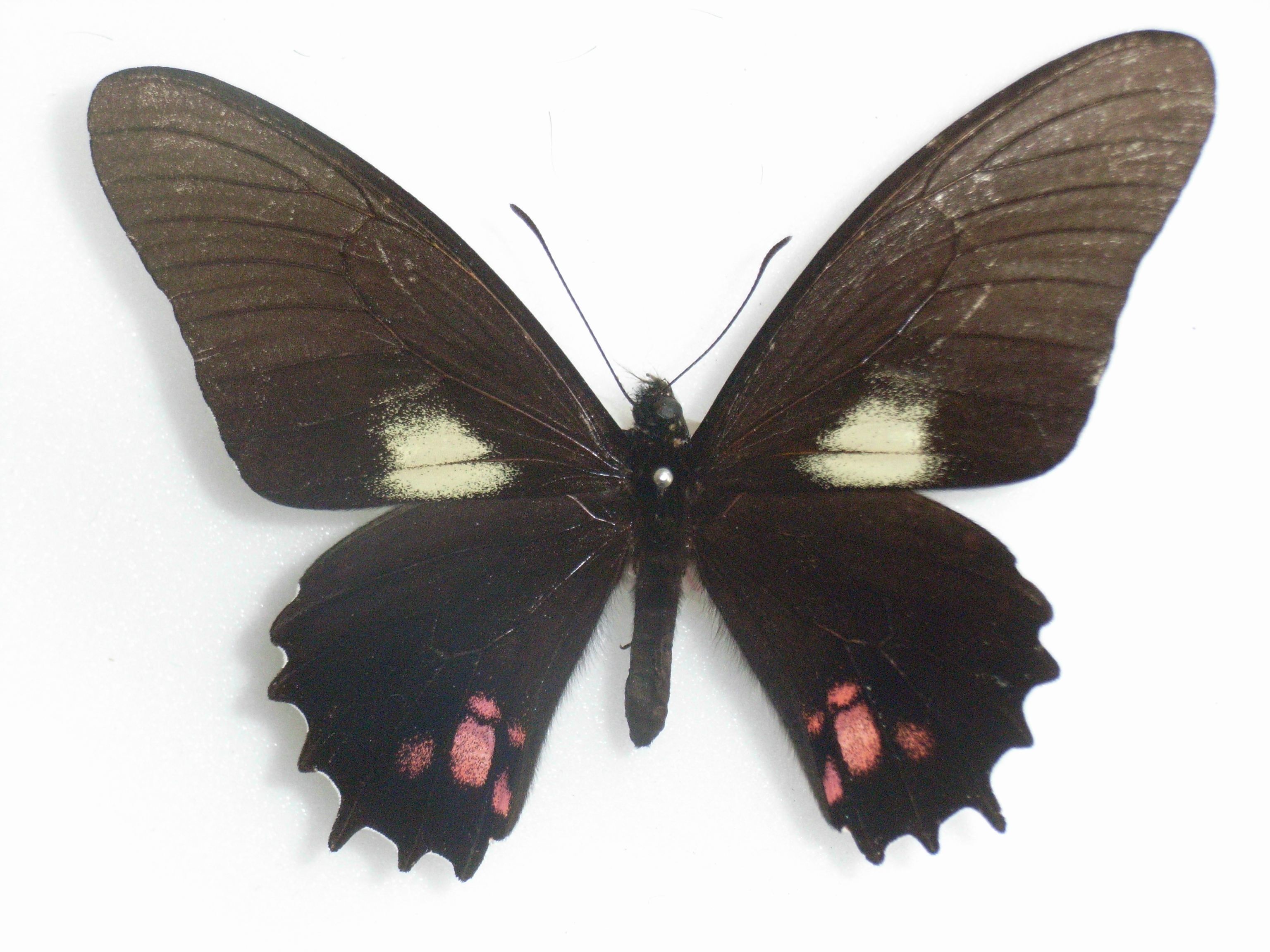

Scientific classification
- Kingdom: Animalia
- Phylum: Arthropoda
- Clade: Pancrustacea
- Class: Insecta
- Order: Lepidoptera
- Family: Papilionidae
- Genus: Papilio
- Species: P. chiansiades

Binomial name
- Papilio chiansiades Westwood, 1872

Synonyms
- Heraclides chiansiades; Papilio maroni

= Papilio chiansiades =

Species of butterfly

Papilio chiansiades is a swallowtail butterfly from the Papilioninae subfamily. It is found in the Neotropical realm (South America).

== Description ==
On the upper surface of the forewing before the hindmargin a large yellowish white spot; on the hindwing posteriorly some red discal and submarginal spots, the spots of the two rows separated from one another; the tooth of the 3. radial prolonged into a short pointed tail.

The wingspan is 52−55 mm.

== Subspecies ==
- Papilio chiansiades chiansiades (Ecuador)
- Papilio chiansiades maroni Moreau, 1923 (French Guiana, Venezuela)
- Papilio chiansiades dospassosi Rütimeyer, 1969 (Colombia)
- Papilio chiansiades mossi (Brown, 1994) (Brazil)

== Taxonomy ==
Papilio chiansiades is a member of the anchisiades species group
