= Papilio epenetus =

- Original illustrations in Illustrations of new species of exotic butterflies (Figs 14, 15)

Scientific classification
- Kingdom: Animalia
- Phylum: Arthropoda
- Clade: Pancrustacea
- Class: Insecta
- Order: Lepidoptera
- Family: Papilionidae
- Genus: Papilio
- Species: P. epenetus

Binomial name
- Papilio epenetus Hewitson, 1861

Species of butterfly

Papilio epenetus is a species of swallowtail butterfly from the genus Papilio that is found in Ecuador.

== Description ==
Tailless. The females is paler than the male. The forewing is without spots except at the margin. The hindwing has large yellowish white marginal spots, and in the female usually also some small discal spots.

== Biology ==
Larvae are found on Citrus.

== Taxonomy ==
Papilio epenetus is a member of the anchisiades species group
