= KNAK (AM) =

Radio station in Delta, Utah

- Delta, Utah; United States
- Broadcast area: Central Utah and vicinity
- Frequency: 540 kHz
- Branding: YAH Radio

Programming
- Format: Defunct (was Talk)

Ownership
- Owner: Patricia Feijo; (KYAH, LLC)

History
- First air date: February 25, 1974 (as KDLT)
- Last air date: April 2023
- Former call signs: KDLT (1973–1979); KNAK (1979–2011); KYAH (2011–2022)

Technical information
- Licensing authority: FCC
- Facility ID: 35207
- Class: D
- Power: 1,000 watts day; 13 watts night
- Transmitter coordinates: 39°20′11.84″N 112°33′23.81″W

Links
- Public license information: Public file; LMS
- Website: www.yahradio540.com

KNAK (540 AM) was a radio station broadcasting a talk format. It was known on the air as "YAH Radio". Licensed to serve Delta, Utah, United States, the station was last owned by KYAH, LLC.

== History ==
KNAK signed on the air with a license to cover on October 7, 1974, as KDLT. It was owned by Glen S. Gardner, with the transmitter being 1.5 miles southeast of Delta. The station was first licensed as a daytimer, transmitting 1,000 watts and signing off at local sunset. In January 1979, the station was sold to L. John Miner.

When 1280 AM in Salt Lake City dropped the KNAK calls, they were picked up by the station in 1979. In the 1980s and 1990s, KNAK carried a country music format.

The station participated in a Guinness World Records activity to celebrate Delta's centennial. The community broke the record for the number of people wearing rabbit ears and hopping in unison.

Beginning in 2009, KNAK (then KYAH) was primarily carrying conservative talk programming. KNAK was simulcast on KHQN, which gave it an improved signal to parts of the Salt Lake City metropolitan area.

As KYAH, the program schedule consisted of an assortment of religious and talk radio programs. KYAH went off the air on October 3, 2022, in anticipation of being sold. On October 13, 2022, James Feijo's DCO Holding, LLC filed an application with the FCC to sell KYAH to Patricia Feijo's KYAH, LLC for $100.00 and the cancellation of outstanding debt. A request for Special Temporary Authority (STA) for the station to remain silent was also filed with the FCC in conjunction with the sale application. The sale was consummated on December 13, 2022, at which point the station changed its call sign to KNAK. In April 2023, the station's tower collapsed, forcing it to go silent again.

The station resumed broadcasting on March 20, 2024, with a website indicating the station was known as "YAH Radio". In September 2024, the station’s license was surrendered for cancellation.

The Federal Communications Commission cancelled the station’s license on September 19, 2024.
