= KJET =

Simulcasting KSWW Ocean Shores
- Union, Washington; United States
- Broadcast area: Olympia, Washington
- Frequency: 105.7 MHz
- Branding: Sunny 102.1

Programming
- Format: Adult contemporary
- Affiliations: NBC News Radio; Westwood One

Ownership
- Owner: Jodesha Broadcasting, Inc.
- Sister stations: KANY, KSWW

History
- First air date: July 1999
- Call sign meaning: The JET (Boeing is a major employer in the region.)

Technical information
- Licensing authority: FCC
- Facility ID: 78160
- Class: C3
- ERP: 510 watts
- HAAT: 627 metres (2,057 ft)
- Transmitter coordinates: 47°19′12.0″N 123°20′44.8″W
- Translators: 93.1 K226AN (Montesano); 106.1 K291BY (Raymond)

Links
- Public license information: Public file; LMS
- Webcast: Listen Live
- Website: KSWW Online

KJET (105.7 FM) is a commercial radio station licensed to Union, Washington, and serving the Olympia, Washington area. The station airs an adult contemporary format and is owned by Jodesha Broadcasting, Inc. Most programming on KJET is from Westwood One's service, with some local segments. KJET formerly used a booster station on the same frequency (105.7) to widen its broadcast area to Grays Harbor County. KJET can also be heard on two FM translator stations.

== History ==
In July 1999, the station first signed on the air. Its city of license was originally South Bend, Washington, and it aired a talk radio format. The original power was 3,200 watts.

Another station, 97.7 KFMY, was licensed to Raymond, Washington. That station later moved its location to Oakville, Washington, about 15 miles east, and boosted its power from 760 watts to 69,000 watts, becoming an FM simulcast for Seattle all news radio station KOMO 1000 AM. KJET switched its city of license to Raymond, to replace the station on 97.7. That was coupled with an increase in power to the current day 13,500 watt effective radiated power (ERP).

KJET switched from its format from talk to hot adult contemporary in the early 2000s.

On October 19, 2021, KJET's hot adult contemporary format moved to KANY 107.3 FM Cosmopolis (rebranding as "Y107.3"), as KJET prepares to move to Union, Washington. Two days later, the stations shifted to a top 40/CHR format.

KJET's community of license changed from Raymond to Union effective January 19, 2022.
