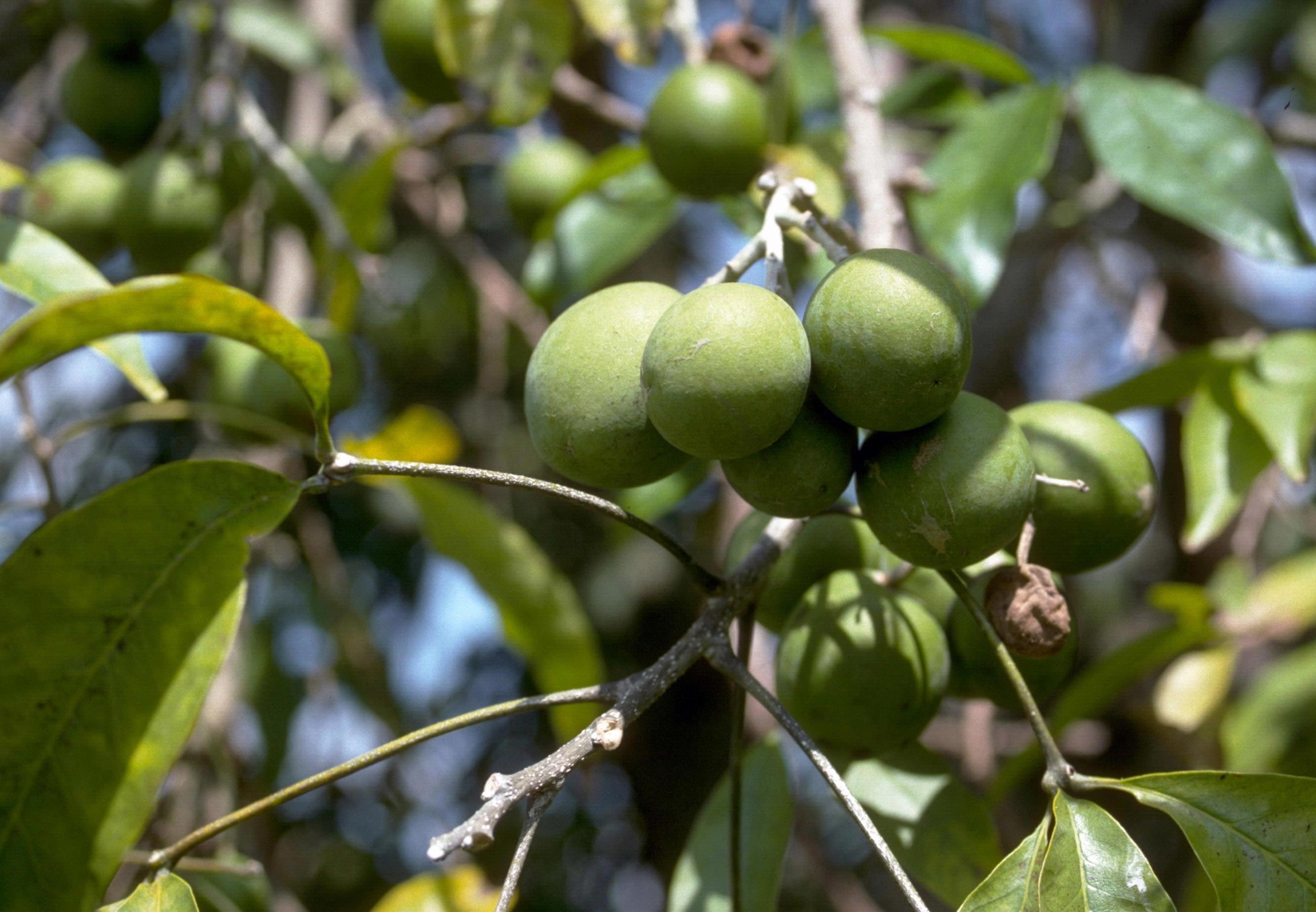
- Casimiroa edulis

Scientific classification
- Kingdom: Plantae
- Clade: Tracheophytes
- Clade: Angiosperms
- Clade: Eudicots
- Clade: Rosids
- Order: Sapindales
- Family: Rutaceae
- Subfamily: Zanthoxyloideae
- Genus: Casimiroa; La Llave & Lex.

Type species
- Casimiroa edulis

Species
- About 10.

= Casimiroa =

Genus of flowering plants

Casimiroa is a genus of flowering plants in the family Rutaceae. It includes about 10 species native to Mexico and Central America. The genus is named for "an Otomi Indian, Casimiro Gómez, from the town of Cardonal in Hidalgo, Mexico, who fought and died in Mexico's war of independence."

A general common name for plants of the genus is sapote. Not all sapotes are members of this genus or even family, however; many sapotes are in the family Sapotaceae, especially the genus Pouteria, and the black sapote is part of the Ebenaceae.

Some species are cultivated. C. edulis (white sapote) produces edible fruit. It is also used as a shade tree in coffee plantations, as an ornamental, as an herbal remedy, and occasionally as lumber. C. sapota, which also produces edible fruit, is grown in Mexico, and C. tetrameria is also known in cultivation.

== Species ==
| Image | Scientific name | Common name | Distribution |
|---|---|---|---|
| | Casimiroa calderoniae | | Mexico (Puebla, Oaxaca) |
| | Casimiroa edulis | white sapote | Mexico (Chiapas, Mexico City, Guerrero, Hidalgo, Michoacán, Nayarit, Oaxaca, Puebla, Querétaro, San Luis Potosí, Tlaxcala and Veracruz.) |
| | Casimiroa emarginata | | Guatemala ( San Marcos) |
| | Casimiroa greggii | | Mexico (Nuevo León, Tamaulipas) |
| | Casimiroa microcarpa | | Mexico (Chiapas), Guatemala |
| | Casimiroa pringlei | Pringle's Sapote | Mexico (San Luis Potosí, Durango, Coahuila, Nuevo León, Tamaulipas) |
| | Casimiroa pubescens | | Mexico (Querétaro, Hidalgo) |
| | Casimiroa sapota | matasano | Mexico, El Salvador, Nicaragua and Costa Rica. |
| | Casimiroa tetrameria | woolly-leaf white sapote, yellow sapote, matasano | S. Mexico to Central America. |
| | Casimiroa watsonii | | Mexico(Jalisco, Colima) |
