= KSWW =

Radio station in Ocean Shores, Washington

- Ocean Shores, Washington; United States
- Broadcast area: Aberdeen, Washington
- Frequency: 102.1 MHz (HD Radio)
- Branding: Sunny 102.1

Programming
- Format: Adult contemporary
- Subchannels: HD1: KSWW analog HD2: Adult hits "100.5 Jack FM"; HD3: Classic country "Timber Country 94.7"; HD4: Country "104.1 Bigfoot Country"
- Affiliations: NBC News Radio; Westwood One

Ownership
- Owner: Jodesha Broadcasting
- Sister stations: KANY, KJET

History
- First air date: 1998 (as KAPV)
- Former call signs: KAPV (1998–1999)

Technical information
- Licensing authority: FCC
- Facility ID: 60544
- Class: C3
- ERP: 14,000 watts
- HAAT: 122 meters (400 ft)
- Transmitter coordinates: 46°56′0.00″N 123°43′57.00″W
- Translators: 101.1 K266BL (Raymond); HD2: 100.5 K263BE (Aberdeen); HD3: 94.7 K234AU (Westport); HD4: 104.1 K281DE (Aberdeen)
- Repeater: 105.7 KJET (Union)

Links
- Public license information: Public file; LMS
- Webcast: Listen Live; Listen Live (HD2); Listen Live (HD3); Listen Live (HD4)
- Website: KSWW Online; KSWW-HD2 Online; KSWW-HD3 Online; KSWW-HD4 Online

KSWW (102.1 FM) is a radio station broadcasting an adult contemporary music format. Licensed to Ocean Shores, Washington, United States, it serves Grays Harbor County. The station is currently owned by Jodesha Broadcasting. It is known as "Sunny 102.1". The station first signed on in 1998. In December 2022, Rhys Davis, morning host for 25 years, retired. At the same time, KSWW dropped the Westwood One affiliation in favor of 24/7 local programming, and launched "AJ In The Morning", a live local show featuring well-known radio talent AJ Battalio. Sunny 102.1 is currently simulcasting on KJET 105.7 FM, licensed to Union, in Mason County, with a signal that covers parts of Mason and Thurston counties.

== Translators ==
KSWW and its HD channels also broadcast on the following translators:

Call sign	Frequency	City of license	FID	ERP (W)	Class	FCC info
K234AU	94.7 FM	Aberdeen, Washington	157470	250	D	LMS
K263BE	100.5 FM	Aberdeen, Washington	143946	250	D	LMS
K266BL	101.1 FM	Raymond, Washington	138405	12	D	LMS
K281DE	104.1 FM	Aberdeen, Washington	138383	250	D	LMS

K266BL rebroadcasts KSWW (Sunny). K263BE rebroadcasts KSWW-HD2 (JACK FM). K234AU rebroadcasts KSWW-HD3 ("Timber Country" Classic Country). K281DE rebroadcasts KSWW-HD4 ("Bigfoot" Hot Country).
