= WTOY =

Radio station in Salem, Virginia

- Salem, Virginia; United States
- Broadcast area: Roanoke County, Virginia
- Frequency: 1480 kHz
- Branding: Power Sound 1480

Programming
- Format: Urban adult contemporary; Urban gospel

Ownership
- Owner: Estate of Irvin Ward, Sr.; (Ward Broadcasting Corporation)

History
- First air date: 1956
- Former call signs: WDJC (1955); WBLU (1955–1978); WUEZ (1978–1983); WSAY (1983–1990)

Technical information
- Licensing authority: FCC
- Facility ID: 29210
- Class: D
- Power: 5,000 watts (day); 20 watts (night)
- Transmitter coordinates: 37°16′21.0″N 80°4′52.0″W

Links
- Public license information: Public file; LMS

WTOY (1480 kHz) is a commercial radio station licensed to Salem, Virginia, United States, and serving Roanoke County, Virginia. Owned by Ward Broadcast Corporation WTOY has an urban adult contemporary and urban gospel format.

== History ==
WTOY signed on the air in 1956.

WTOY failed to file an application when its license was due for renewal in 2019, and it expired on October 1. Upon receiving notice of the license expiration, Irwin Ward's estate filed a renewal and requested to authorize its operations under special temporary authority on November 7. The applications claimed that sole owner Irvin Ward died on August 18 and no one in his family or estate was aware of the upcoming renewal. The Federal Communications Commission reinstated the license with a $7,000 fine for the five weeks of unauthorized operation on June 4, 2020.
