= KHQN =

- Spanish Fork, Utah; United States
- Broadcast area: Utah Valley; Salt Lake City (limited)
- Frequency: 1480 kHz
- Branding: KHQN 1480 AM

Programming
- Format: Hindu music, chants and discussion

Ownership
- Owner: SACE Broadcasting Corporation

History
- First air date: July 24, 1960
- Former call signs: KONI (1960–1983)

Technical information
- Licensing authority: FCC
- Facility ID: 58480
- Class: D
- Power: 1,000 watts (days); 133 watts (nights)
- Transmitter coordinates: 40°04′29.8″N 111°39′44.7″W

Links
- Public license information: Public file; LMS
- Website: UtahKirishnas.org

Radio station in Spanish Fork, Utah.

KHQN (1480 kHz) is a non-commercial AM radio station licensed to Spanish Fork, Utah, and serving the Utah Valley and the southern suburbs of Salt Lake City. The station's broadcast license is held by SACE Broadcasting Corporation. KHQN has a radio format of Hindu music, chants and discussion, as a service of the Spanish Fork Krishna Temple and the Salt Lake City Krishna Temple.

By day, KHQN transmits with 1,000 watts, using a non-directional antenna. To protect other stations on 1480 kHz from interference, at night it reduces power to 133 watts. The transmitter is on Utah State Route 198 in Salem, near the Spanish Fork Krishna Temple.

The Political Cesspool, a weekly far-right talk radio show founded by Tennessean political activist James Edwards, is broadcast on KHQN. It also simulcasts on the neo-Nazi Stormfront Radio.

== History ==
The station signed on the air on July 24, 1960. Its original call sign was KONI. The station was a daytimer, required to go off the air at night. The owner was the Pioneer Broadcasting Company.

In 1967, it added a sister station, KONI-FM on 106.3 MHz. The two stations mostly simulcast a format of country music with local news and high school sports. KONI-FM was sold in 1980. Today, it is 106.5 KAAZ, a classic rock station owned by iHeartMedia, Inc.

In 1983, the station changed its callsign to KHQN. It carried a Mainstream Rock format. In 1984, it became the only station in the United States broadcasting Hare Krishna programming full-time. The Krishna Temple of Spanish Fork took over the station from the Schofield family, the previous owners. KHQN began airing English-language devotional Hindu music, religious instruction programs and a call-in show for college students. A few hours a week were for Spanish-speaking residents in Utah County.

To help support the Spanish Fork Krishna Temple, Sace Broadcasting decided to lease the station to a Spanish-language broadcaster.

The station changed to a Spanish news, talk and music format in 2006. In December 2016, the lease ended. KHQN was re-acquired by the Krishna Temple's Sace Broadcasting. The station returned to airing Hare Krishna programming full-time. The station returned to airing Hare Krishna programming full-time.
