= WRSW-FM =

- Warsaw, Indiana; United States
- Frequency: 107.3 MHz
- Branding: 107.3 WRSW

Programming
- Format: Classic hits
- Affiliations: Fox News Radio; United Stations Radio Networks

Ownership
- Owner: Kensington Digital Media of Indiana, L.L.C.
- Sister stations: WRSW

History
- First air date: 1948

Technical information
- Licensing authority: FCC
- Facility ID: 73967
- Class: B
- ERP: 50,000 watts
- HAAT: 69 meters
- Transmitter coordinates: 41°13′21.00″N 85°50′17.00″W

Links
- Public license information: Public file; LMS
- Webcast: Listen Live
- Website: 1073wrsw.com

WRSW-FM (107.3 MHz) is a radio station broadcasting a classic hits format. Licensed to Warsaw, Indiana, United States, the station is owned by Kensington Digital Media of Indiana. The station was formerly owned by Talking Stick Communications, a subsidiary of Federated Media. The station features programming from Fox News Radio, and United Stations Radio Networks.

The current on-air lineup includes Nash (unknown last name) and Mandy Whitaker (Lake City Morning Show), Hall of Famer Rita Price mid-days, Kris Lake in the afternoons, and the syndicated Alice Cooper Show nights. The station also features news by Dan Spalding and sports by Roger Grossman.

The station airs high school sports from Tippecanoe Valley High School with sports coverage by Rita Price and Baylen Hite. The station is programmed by Kris Lake, managed by Woody Zimmerman and is located in downtown Warsaw, IN.

== History ==
WRSW-FM is noted as the "heritage station of Kosciusko County" and is one of the oldest FM stations in the area. It celebrated 70 years of broadcasting in Warsaw, IN on August 11, 2018. The station also held a month-long celebration honoring 75 years in 2023. During the 1960s, WRSW-AM/FM studios were used to host the annual All-County Spelling Championship.

For several years, the station was owned by Talking Stick Communications, a subsidiary of Federated Media. In 2002, Federated Media purchased WRSW-AM and WRSW-FM (then at 107.1) along with a second FM station in Warsaw, which is now WAWC-FM (103.5)

The radio station (along with sister stations WAWC and WRSW) was purchased by Kensington Digital Media on May 15, 2018. The purchase, at a price of $2.4 million, was consummated on September 5, 2018.
