= WJFC =

- Jefferson City, Tennessee; United States
- Frequency: 1480 kHz
- Branding: Lakeway Connection

Programming
- Format: Classic Country

Ownership
- Owner: Lakeway Broadcasting, LLC

Technical information
- Licensing authority: FCC
- Facility ID: 18402
- Class: D
- Power: 500 watts day 34 watts night
- Transmitter coordinates: 36°6′26.00″N 83°29′12.00″W
- Repeaters: W276CE (103.1 FM); W275BP (102.9 MHz, Jefferson City)

Links
- Public license information: Public file; LMS

WJFC (1480 AM, "Lakeway Connection") is a radio station broadcasting a classic country music format. Licensed to Jefferson City, Tennessee, United States, the station is currently owned by Lakeway Broadcasting, LLC.
