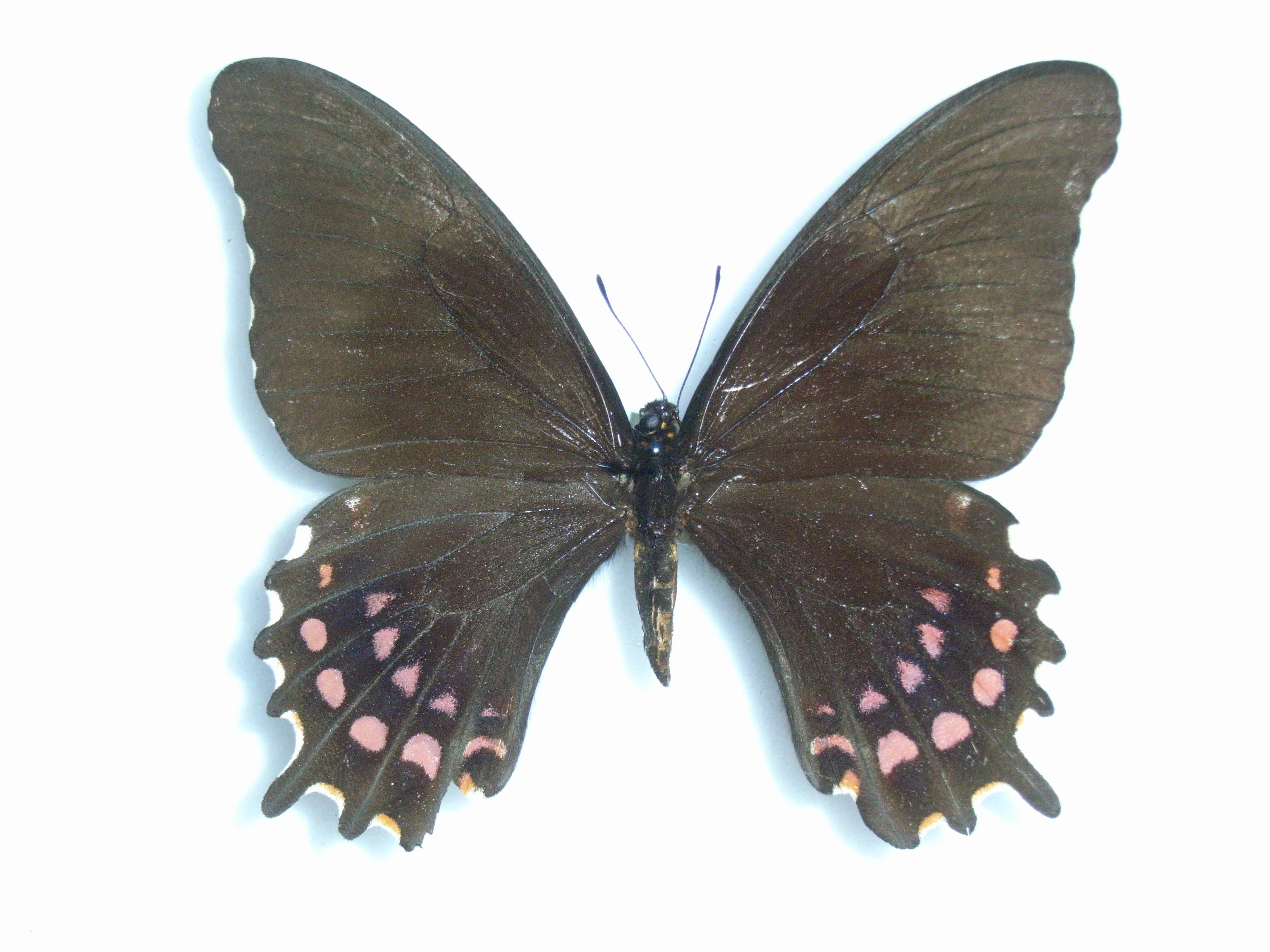

Scientific classification
- Kingdom: Animalia
- Phylum: Arthropoda
- Clade: Pancrustacea
- Class: Insecta
- Order: Lepidoptera
- Family: Papilionidae
- Genus: Papilio
- Species: P. rogeri

Binomial name
- Papilio rogeri Boisduval, 1836

Synonyms
- Heraclides rogeri; Papilio pharnaces Doubleday, 1846; Papilio phanostratus Godman & Salvin, [1890]; Papilio polycharmus Godman & Salvin, [1890]; Priamides pharnaces; Heraclides pharnaces

= Papilio rogeri =

Pink-spotted swallowtail

Species of butterfly

Papilio rogeri, the pink-spotted swallowtail, is a butterfly of the family Papilionidae (swallowtails). It is found in central and southern Mexico. One stray has been reported from the lower Rio Grande Valley in Texas, United States.

== Description ==
Forewing lighter in color from the apex of the cell outwards, the dark basal area rounded distally; hindwing with suggestion of a small tail; some red spots on the disc, in two separate rows, in the male the proximal spots very small, usually only indicated; in the female all the spots larger than in the male.

The wingspan is 84–95 mm.

== Biology ==
Adults are on wing from February to October in Mexico and in April in southern Texas.

The larvae feed on Rutaceae species. Adults feed on flower nectar.

== Subspecies ==
- Papilio rogeri rogeri – (Mexico)
- Papilio rogeri pharnaces Doubleday, 1846 – (Mexico) More or less distinctly tailed, hindwing with two separated rows of red spots, the proximal spots in the male often very small.

== Taxonomy ==
Papilio rogeri is a member of the anchisiades species group
