= Washington Savannah River Company =

Defunct US environmental business

Washington Savannah River Company LLC
- Company type: Subsidiary
- Industry: Environmental remediation
- Founded: 1989 (Aiken, South Carolina)
- Headquarters: Savannah River Site, Aiken, South Carolina, United States
- Key people: Leo Sain (President)
- Parent: Westinghouse Government Services Company LLC

Washington Savannah River Company LLC was an environmental remediation company that operated the Savannah River Site, Aiken, South Carolina until 2009.

== Overview ==
Washington Savannah River Company, LLC provides environmental cleanup, nuclear waste collection and disposal, and remediation services. The company was formerly known as Westinghouse Savannah River Company LLC, changing its name to Washington Savannah River Company, LLC in September 2005. The company was founded in 1989 and is based in Aiken, South Carolina. The new firm assumed the operation of the Savannah River Site from DuPont who had built and run the plant from 1950. Washington Savannah River Company, LLC operates as a subsidiary of Westinghouse Government Services Company LLC.

In 2008 the Department of Energy awarded the contract to manage and operate the Savannah River Site (SRS) to Savannah River Nuclear Solutions and a contract to manage the liquid waste at the Site to Savannah River Remediation. In 2009 Washington Savannah River Company, LLC's contract ended as the two new contractors took over operations.
