= KBRO =

Radio station in Bremerton, Washington

- Bremerton, Washington; United States
- Frequency: 1480 kHz
- Branding: La Estacion de la Familia

Programming
- Language: Spanish
- Format: Contemporary Christian

Ownership
- Owner: Iglesia Pentecostal Víspera del Fin
- Sister stations: KLDY

History
- First air date: May 1, 1947
- Former frequencies: 1490 kHz (1947–2026)

Technical information
- Licensing authority: FCC
- Facility ID: 48248
- Class: D
- Power: 5,000 watts daytime; 12 watts nighttime
- Transmitter coordinates: 47°33′52.3″N 122°39′34.5″W
- Translator: 100.3 K262DE (Bremerton)

Links
- Public license information: Public file; LMS
- Webcast: Listen live
- Website: laestaciondelafamilia.org

Former simulcast
- KNTB
- Lakewood, Washington; United States
- Frequency: 1480 kHz

Ownership
- Owner: Iglesia Pentecostal Vispera Del Fin

History
- First air date: September 1978
- Last air date: March 2026

Technical information
- Facility ID: 26892
- Class: D
- Power: 1,000 watts daytime; 111 watts nighttime
- Transmitter coordinates: 47°9′55.35″N 122°34′36.46″W
- Translator: 92.1 K221FJ (Tacoma)

Links
- Public license information: Public file; LMS

KBRO (1480 AM) is a radio station in Bremerton, Washington, United States, serving the Puget Sound region. KBRO broadcasts with 5,000 watts daytime and 12 watts nighttime, and is owned by Iglesia Pentecostal Víspera del Fin. Until 2026, KBRO operated on 1490 kHz with 1,000 watts full-time, and was simulcast on KNTB in Lakewood, Washington, at 1480 kHz with 1,000 watts day and 111 watts night.

== History ==
KBRO, which signed on the air on May 1, 1947, was the one-time sister station of the current KRWM during its early years as Bremerton's dominant community station. KNTB signed on the air as KQLA with an MOR and talk format in September 1978.

The two stations became simulcasts in 1998 as affiliates of the Triangle Radio Network, a service that targeted the LGBT community with a mix of music, talk, and specialty fare. Controversy, a lack of support from advertisers and signal coverage would force the stations to drop the network and, in the process, be sold to its current owners, in September 2000. After a short term of broadcasting oldies, the stations moved to a Hispanic Christian format in 2005. Later, KLDY (in Lacey-Olympia, Washington) and K221FJ (an FM translator in Tacoma, Washington) were added to the network.

The stations then broadcast programming from ESPN Deportes Radio, alongside Spanish-language broadcasts of the Seattle Mariners and Seattle Seahawks.

On March 30, 2015, KBRO and KNTB went silent. On May 22, 2015, KBRO returned to the air with a simulcast of Spanish contemporary Christian-formatted KLSY 93.7 FM. On November 10, 2015, KNTB returned to the air, also simulcasting KLSY.

The Federal Communications Commission cancelled KNTB's license on March 3, 2026. The closure of KNTB was necessary so that KBRO could move from 1490 kHz to 1480 kHz and increase its daytime power.
