= WRSW (AM) =

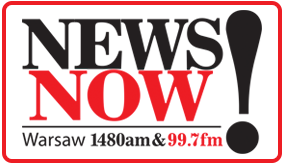
- Warsaw, Indiana; United States
- Frequency: 1480 kHz
- Branding: 1480 News Now

Programming
- Format: News/Talk

Ownership
- Owner: Kensington Digital Media of Indiana, L.L.C.
- Sister stations: WRSW-FM

History
- First air date: 1951

Technical information
- Licensing authority: FCC
- Facility ID: 73968
- Class: B
- Power: 1,000 watts day 500 watts night
- Transmitter coordinates: 41°13′21″N 85°50′17″W
- Translators: 99.7 MHz (W259BJ, Warsaw)

Links
- Public license information: Public file; LMS
- Website: newsnowwarsaw.com

WRSW (1480 AM) is a radio station broadcasting a news/talk format to the Warsaw, Indiana, United States, area. The station is owned by Kensington Digital Media of Indiana, L.L.C.

== History ==
WRSW first signed on the air in 1951. In its early history, WRSW was one of the local media outlets that provided live coverage for the Warsaw Speedway midget races at the Kosciusko County Fairgrounds in the late 1940s and early 1950s. The station was formerly owned by Talking Stick Communications, a subsidiary of Federated Media. Federated Media acquired WRSW-AM (1480 kHz) and WRSW-FM (then at 107.1 MHz) in 2002. The station was sold to Kensington Digital Media of Indiana, L.L.C. in 2018. Kensington Digital Media reached an agreement with Talking Stick Communications to purchase the cluster of stations—WRSW-AM, WRSW-FM, and WAWC-FM—in May 2018.

== Programming and Translator ==
WRSW broadcasts a News/Talk format branded as "1480 News Now". To extend its coverage, especially during the night when AM power is often reduced, the station operates an FM translator: W259BJ on 99.7 MHz in Warsaw, Indiana. The programming slate focuses heavily on local news and information, including coverage of Warsaw Tiger Sports.
