= KLSY =

- Montesano, Washington; United States
- Frequency: 93.7 MHz
- Branding: 93.7 Tu Familia FM

Programming
- Language: Spanish
- Format: Contemporary Christian

Ownership
- Owner: Centro Familiar Cristiano

History
- First air date: 2008
- Former call signs: KANY (2005–2014)

Technical information
- Licensing authority: FCC
- Facility ID: 164149
- Class: C0
- ERP: 33,000 watts
- HAAT: 677 meters (2,221 ft)
- Transmitter coordinates: 46°56′0″N 123°43′57″W
- Translators: 99.5 K258BJ (Everett); 102.5 K273BV (Hoquiam); 106.3 K292HN (Centralia)

Links
- Public license information: Public file; LMS
- Webcast: Listen live
- Website: tufamiliafm.com

KLSY (93.7 FM) is an American radio station licensed to serve the community of Montesano, Washington, United States. The station, established in 2008, is owned by Centro Familiar Cristiano.

== History ==
This station received its original construction permit from the Federal Communications Commission on March 25, 2005. The new station was assigned the KANY call sign by the FCC on October 13, 2005.

While still under construction, College Creek Media, LLC, reached an agreement in December 2006 to sell this station to Jodesha Broadcasting, Inc. The deal was approved by the FCC on January 23, 2007, and the transaction was consummated on March 16, 2007. KANY received its license to cover from the FCC on March 27, 2008.

On May 7, 2014, KANY began stunting with birdcalls, ID-ing as 93.7 The Birds, while the "Bigfoot" country format moved to KLSY 107.3 FM Cosmopolis, Washington.

On May 14, 2014, KANY ended stunting and launched a Spanish contemporary Christian format, branded as 93.7 La Familia". On May 19, 2014, KANY changed their call letters to KLSY as KLSY changed their call letters to KANY.

The station was acquired by Centro Familiar Cristiano effective September 25, 2014, for $6.75 million.
