= WPFJ =

- Franklin, North Carolina; United States
- Frequency: 1480 kHz
- Branding: Toccoa Falls Radio

Programming
- Format: Gospel

Ownership
- Owner: Radio Training Network, Inc.

History
- First air date: 1980
- Former call signs: WLTM (1980–1987); WAJA (1987–1994)

Technical information
- Licensing authority: FCC
- Class: D
- Power: 5,000 watts day 13 watts night
- Transmitter coordinates: 35°10′58″N 83°21′27″W
- Translator: (100.9 MHz) W265AZ (Franklin)

Links
- Public license information: Public file; LMS

WPFJ (1480 AM) is a radio station broadcasting a Gospel format. It is licensed to Franklin, North Carolina, United States. The station is owned by Radio Training Network, Inc.
