= WQTM =

- Fair Bluff, North Carolina; United States
- Frequency: 1480 kHz
- Branding: Throwback Joy 1480 AM

Programming
- Format: Urban gospel

Ownership
- Owner: Keith Baldwin

History
- First air date: October 21, 1967
- Former call signs: WWKO (1967–1984); WNFO (1984–1988); WJHB (1988–1996); WNCR (1996–2002); WVXY (2002); WZFB (2002–2006); WSRC (2006–2009); WWKO (2009–2011)
- Call sign meaning: "Team" (former sports format)

Technical information
- Licensing authority: FCC
- Facility ID: 2860
- Class: D
- Power: 10,000 watts day 48 watts night
- Transmitter coordinates: 34°19′23.00″N 79°0′7.00″W

Links
- Public license information: Public file; LMS

WQTM (1480 AM) is a commercial radio station licensed to Fair Bluff, North Carolina. The station is currently owned by Keith Baldwin.

WQTM fell silent on September 15, 2018 due to damage from Hurricane Florence, the station formerly broadcast a sports talk format.

The station was reassigned its legacy WWKO call letters by the Federal Communications Commission on January 29, 2009. The station changed call sign to WQTM and returned to the air as a simulcast of WEVG in Evergreen, Alabama effective July 12, 2011.

The simulcast with WEVG ended due to then-station owners Rama Communications not paying for services rendered by WEVG. Effective July 9, 2019, Rama Communications sold WQTM and the construction permit for translator W279DQ to Keith Baldwin for $10. After the sale, WQTM dropped the sports format in favor of an urban gospel format.
