= Cardonal =

- Town and municipality
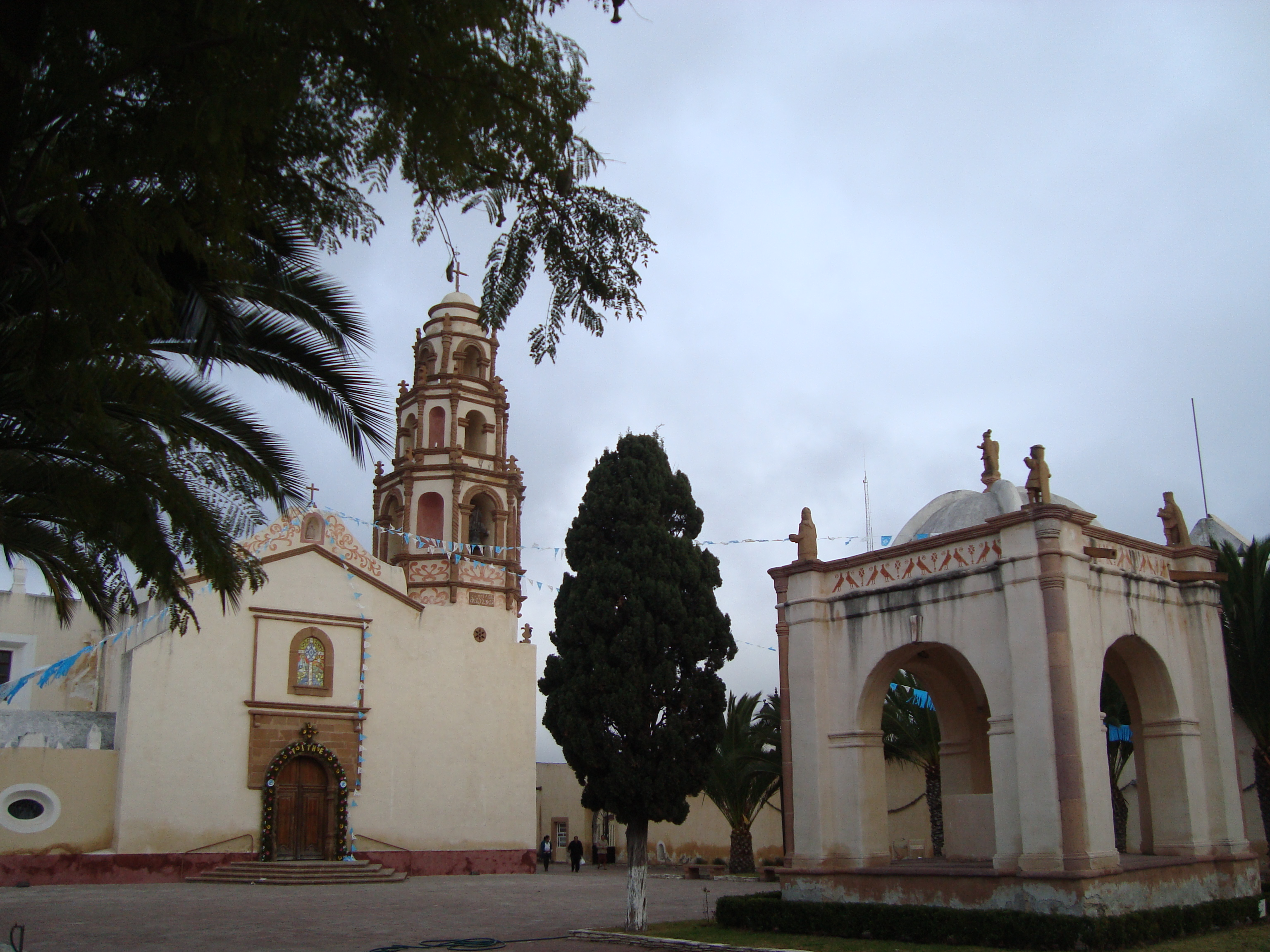

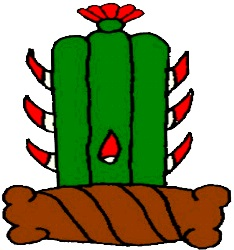
- Coat of arms

- Location in Mexico Cardonal (Mexico)
- Coordinates: 20°37′N 99°07′W
- Country: Mexico
- State: Hidalgo
- Municipality: Cardonal

Government
  - Federal electoral district: Hidalgo's 2nd

Area
  - Total: 462.6 km^{2} (178.6 sq mi)

Population (2020)
  - Total: 19,431
- Time zone: UTC-6 (Zona Centro)
- Website: cardonal.hidalgo.gob.mx

Cardonal (Otomi: ʼMohai) is a town and one of the 84 municipalities of Hidalgo, in central-eastern Mexico. The municipality covers an area of 462.6 km^{2} (178.6 sq mi).

As of 2020, the municipality had a total population of 19,431, up from 15,876 in 2005.
